= Ockendon (ward) =

- Electoral ward for the Thurrock Council
- Ockendon ward boundaries since 2004
- District: Thurrock
- County: Essex
- Population: 11,967 (2021)
- Major settlements: South Ockendon
- Area: 11.53 square kilometres (4.45 sq mi)

Current electoral ward
- Created: 1979
- Number of members: 3
- Councillors: Alan Benson; Russell Cherry; Jay Varley
- ONS code: 00KGNH
- GSS code: E05002239

Ockendon is an electoral ward of Thurrock. It was first used at the 1979 elections. The ward returns three councillors to Thurrock Council.

== Thurrock council elections since 2026 ==
There was a revision of ward boundaries in Thurrock in 2026 with all seats up for election that year.

=== 2026 election ===
The election took place on 7 May 2026.

2026 Thurrock Council election: Ockendon (3)
Party	Candidate	Votes	%	±%
Reform	Alan Benson	1,500	57.6	N/A
Reform	Russ Cherry	1,473	56.6	N/A
Reform	Jay Varley	1,324	50.9	N/A
Labour	Jayden O'Brien	607	23.3	–29.8
Labour	Peter Singh	521	20.0	–33.1
Conservative	Sue Johnson	506	19.4	–27.5
Green	Rory Hildick	468	18.0	N/A
Conservative	Leo Dredge	442	17.0	–29.9
Conservative	Graham Snell	421	16.2	–30.7
Labour	Prince Ogbomoh	410	15.7	–37.4
Independent	Kameel Mohammed	138	5.3	N/A
Turnout		2,857	34.6	+5.6
Registered electors		8,243		
Reform hold				
Reform hold				
Reform gain from Conservative				

== 2004–2026 Thurrock council elections ==
There was a revision of ward boundaries in Thurrock in 2004 with all seats up for election that year. The subsequent election cycle for the first Ockendon seat was 2006, 2010, 2014, 2018 and 2022. The cycle for the second seat was 2007, 2011, 2015, 2019 and 2023. The cycle for the third seat was 2008, 2012, 2016, 2021 and 2024.

=== 2025 by-election ===
The by-election took place 1 May 2025, following the resignations of Ryan Polston and Andrew Jefferies.

2025 Ockendon by-election
Party	Candidate	Votes	%	±%
Reform	Alan Benson	1,214		
Reform	Russell Cherry	1,138		
Conservative	Sue Johnson	533		
Labour	Shalini Bhatt	478		
Conservative	Graham Snell	439		
Labour	Haruna Hamza	438		
Green	Ri Goodyear	93		
Green	Daniel Fallows	86		
Liberal Democrats	Brad Hayman	74		
Independent	Kameel Mohammed	47		
Turnout		2,368	27.98	
Reform gain from Labour		Swing		
Reform gain from Conservative		Swing		

=== 2024 election ===
The election took place on 2 May 2024.

2024 Thurrock Council election: Ockendon
Party	Candidate	Votes	%	±%
Labour	Ryan Polston	1,271	53.1	+13.2
Conservative	Luke Spillman	1,123	46.9	−1.4
Majority		148		
Turnout		2,394	29	
Registered electors				
Labour gain from Conservative		Swing		

=== 2023 election ===
The election took place on 4 May 2023.

2023 Thurrock Council election: Ockendon
Party	Candidate	Votes	%	±%
Conservative	Andrew Jefferies	1,014	48.3	–5.5
Labour	Gary Watson	839	39.9	–6.3
Thurrock Ind.	Ross Byrne	248	11.8	N/A
Majority		175	8.4	+0.8
Turnout		2,110	25.3	+1.9
Registered electors		8,333		
Conservative hold		Swing	▲0.6	

=== 2022 election ===
The election took place on 5 May 2022.

2022 Thurrock Council election: Ockendon
Party	Candidate	Votes	%	±%
Conservative	Paul Arnold	1,021	53.8	−1.4
Labour	Ruth Clapham	877	46.2	+12.9
Majority		144		
Turnout		1,923	23.35	
Conservative gain from Labour		Swing		

=== 2021 election ===
The election took place on 6 May 2021.

2021 Thurrock Council election: Ockendon
Party	Candidate	Votes	%	±%
Conservative	Luke Spillman	1,213	55.2	+26.8
Labour	Ruth Clapham	733	33.3	+8.3
Thurrock Ind.	Maurice Kelley	252	11.5	N/A
Majority				
Conservative gain from UKIP		Swing		

=== 2019 election ===
The election took place on 2 May 2019.

2019 Thurrock Council election: Ockendon
Party	Candidate	Votes	%	±%
Conservative	Andrew Jefferies	982	41.1	+8.1
Labour	Ruth Clapham	745	31.2	−6.8
Thurrock Ind.	Jan Baker	663	27.7	−1.3
Majority				
Conservative gain from UKIP		Swing		

=== 2018 election ===
The election took place on 3 May 2018.

2018 Thurrock Council election: Ockendon
Party	Candidate	Votes	%	±%
Labour	Sue Shinnick	864	38	+17
Conservative	Romanus Nwakuna	740	33	+2
Thurrock Ind.	Jan Baker	663	29	+29
Majority		124		
Labour gain from Thurrock Ind.		Swing		

=== 2018 by-election ===
The by-election took place on 22 March 2018, following the resignation of Kevin Wheeler. Andrew Jefferies and Les Strange each received 696 votes and the tie was resolved by picking the name of the winner out of a box.

2018 Ockendon by-election
Party	Candidate	Votes	%	±%
Conservative	Andrew Jefferies	696	36.1	
Labour	Les Strange	696	36.1	
Thurrock Ind.	Jack Duffin	531	28.8	
Majority		0		
Turnout				
Conservative gain from UKIP		Swing		

=== 2016 election ===
The election took place on 5 May 2016.

2016 Thurrock Council election: Ockendon
Party	Candidate	Votes	%	±%
UKIP	David Potter	1,038	46.5	
Conservative	Barry Johnson	634	28.4	
Labour	Desmond Martins	558	25.1	
Majority		404		
UKIP gain from Conservative		Swing		

=== 2015 election ===
The election took place on 7 May 2015.

2015 Thurrock Council election: Ockendon
Party	Candidate	Votes	%	±%
UKIP	Kevin Wheeler	1,991	44.1	+35.6
Conservative	Benjamin Gadsby	1,297	28.8	−9.5
Labour	Anthony Fish	1,224	27.1	−14.5
Majority		694	15.3	
Turnout		4,512	64.4	+25.5
UKIP gain from Labour		Swing		
