= The Homesteads, Essex =

Coordinates: 51.53046°N 0.43648°E

The Homesteads
- Housing estate and ward
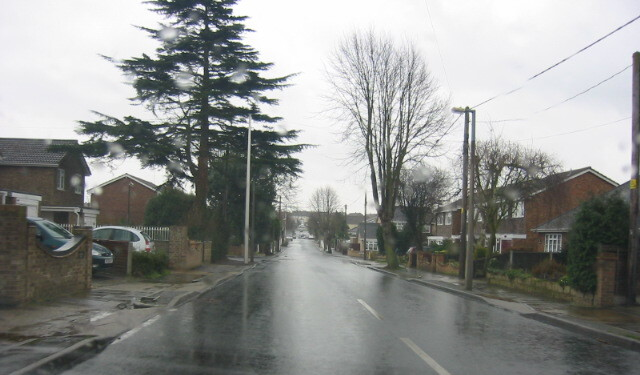
- Branksome Avenue, The Homesteads

- Location within Essex
- Population: 8,452 (2021 census)
- OS grid reference: TQ691841
- Shire county: Essex
- Region: East
- Country: England
- Sovereign state: United Kingdom
- Post town: STANFORD-LE-HOPE
- Postcode district: SS17
- Dialling code: 01375
- Police: Essex
- Fire: Essex
- Ambulance: East of England

The Homesteads, also known as Balstonia, is a housing estate and ward in the town of Stanford-le-Hope in Thurrock, Essex, England. It is situated on the town's eastern boundary with Corringham, around half-a-mile north-east of Stanford-le-Hope town centre and Stanford-le-Hope railway station. It had a population of 8,452 in the 2021 census.

== History ==
Historically, the land at The Homesteads was home to Potters Farm and Abbots Hall Farm. In the late 1890s, 450 acres of farmland north of Southend Road on the eastern boundary of Corringham was sold to housing developer Homesteads Ltd., who planned to develop the land into a housing estate. Homesteads Ltd. named it Balstonia; it has been theorised that Balstonia was named after a senior officer from Homesteads Ltd. who was named Balston. By the 1930s, the estate itself had also become known as The Homesteads, which is said to have reflected its early character; the early estate was formed from an ad-hoc collection of smallholdings and houses, namely bungalows, with most homes having no gas, electricity, piped water or sewage links, like other 19th century homes. The area is still generally known as The Homesteads today, which has become its name in official usage.

Homesteads Ltd. planned for Balstonia to consist of two parts, one to the south of the London, Tilbury and Southend Railway divided into seven avenues and one to the north of the railway line which was never constructed; construction of Balstonia was stopped by the outbreak of the First World War, and the rising poverty and mortality in the 1920s and 1930s ended the incentive for continued development.

After the Second World War, many of the original homes in The Homesteads were sold off, demolished and redeveloped into more modern and dense housing. What had remained of Potters Farm was redeveloped into new road and housing, while flooding from the local River Hope necessitated further redevelopment in the southern part of the estate. Today, the estate forms a large residential area in Stanford-le-Hope, with few retail or leisure facilities, including no schools or bus links. In the 2021 census, it had a recorded population of 8,452 people.

== Politics and governance ==
The Homesteads is in the parliamentary constituency of South Basildon and East Thurrock. The local member of Parliament (MP) is James McMurdock, an independent politician, who was first elected at the 2024 general election as a candidate for Reform UK. The local authority is Thurrock Council which has held unitary authority status since 1998. As such, the council is responsible for all local government services in the area. The Homesteads also falls under the jurisdiction of Essex Police and the Essex County Fire and Rescue Service which are overseen by the elected Police, Fire and Crime Commissioner for Essex. Since 2016, the police, fire and crime commissioner has been Roger Hirst of the Conservative Party.

For the purposes of local elections to Thurrock Council, The Homesteads forms a single electoral ward which elects three councillors who serve for a term of four years. The ward took on its current boundaries in 2004.

Historically, The Homesteads was more supportive of the Labour Party. All three councillors for The Homesteads came from the Labour Party until the 2007 council election, when the Conservative Party won their first councillor for the ward. In the following years, the ward became more supportive of the Conservatives, who won the ward at every subsequent local election until the 2019 council election, when the Thurrock Independents won the ward. The Thurrock Independents retained their seat in the 2023 council election, while the Conservatives retained their seats in the 2021 and 2022 council elections before losing to Labour at the 2024 council election.

== Geography ==
The Homesteads is centred on Branksome Avenue, which runs through the middle of the estate. It is around half-a-mile north east of Stanford-le-Hope town centre and Stanford-le-Hope railway station and is situated on the northern side of Southend Road, facing the eastern boundary of Corringham. The land itself is arable and pasture land. The local River Hope (or Hassingbrook) runs near the south of the estate.
