= Belhus (ward) =

Electoral ward in Thurrock, Essex, England

- Electoral ward for the Thurrock Council
- Belhus ward boundaries since 2004
- District: Thurrock
- County: Essex
- Population: 10,471 (2021)
- Area: 6.28 square kilometres (2.42 sq mi)

Current electoral ward
- Created: 1979
- Number of members: 3
- Councillors: George Coxshall; Mark Hurrell; Victoria Holloway
- ONS code: 00KGMY
- GSS code: E05002230

Belhus is an electoral ward of Thurrock. It was first used at the 1979 elections. The ward returns three councillors to Thurrock Council.

== Thurrock council elections since 2004 ==
There was a revision of ward boundaries in Thurrock in 2004 with all seats up for election that year. The subsequent election cycle for the first Belhus seat was 2006, 2010, 2014, 2018 and 2022. The cycle for the second seat was 2007, 2011, 2015, 2019 and 2023. The cycle for the third seat was 2008, 2012, 2016, 2021 and 2024.

=== 2024 election ===
The election took place on 2 May 2024.

2024 Thurrock Council election: Belhus
Party	Candidate	Votes	%	±%
Labour	Victoria Holloway	1,072	68.9	+20.4
Conservative	Georgette Polley	483	31.1	+3.6
Majority		589		
Turnout			21.79	
Registered electors				
Labour gain from Conservative		Swing		

=== 2023 election ===
The election took place on 4 May 2023.

2023 Thurrock Council election: Belhus
Party	Candidate	Votes	%	±%
Labour	Mark Hurrell	765	48.5	–0.3
Conservative	Abbie Akinbohun	433	27.5	–23.7
Thurrock Ind.	Chris Baker	299	19.0	N/A
UKIP	Michael Keal	79	5.0	N/A
Majority		332	21.0	N/A
Turnout		1,579	21.9	–1.9
Registered electors		7,210		
Labour gain from Thurrock Ind.		Swing	▲11.7	

=== 2022 election ===
The election took place on 5 May 2022.

2022 Thurrock Council election: Belhus
Party	Candidate	Votes	%	±%
Conservative	George Coxshall	864	51.2	+6.4
Labour	Mark Hurrell	822	48.8	+15.1
Majority		42		
Turnout		1,706	23.76	
Conservative gain from Labour		Swing		
