= Aveley and Uplands (ward) =

- Former electoral ward for the Thurrock Council
- Ockendon ward boundaries
- District: Thurrock
- County: Essex
- Population: 10,824 (2021)
- Area: 10.03 square kilometres (3.87 sq mi)

Former electoral ward
- Created: 2004
- Abolished: 2026
- Number of members: 3
- Member: Councillors
- Replaced by: Aveley
- ONS code: 00KGMX
- GSS code: E05002229

Aveley and Uplands was an electoral ward of Thurrock. It was first used at the 2004 elections and last used for the 2024 elections. The ward returned three councillors to Thurrock Council.

== Thurrock council elections ==
There was a revision of ward boundaries in Thurrock in 2004 with all seats up for election that year. The subsequent election cycle for the first Aveley and Uplands seat was 2006, 2010, 2014, 2018 and 2022. The cycle for the second seat was 2007, 2011, 2015, 2019 and 2023. The cycle for the third seat was 2008, 2012, 2016, 2021 and 2024.

=== 2024 election ===
The election took place on 2 May 2024.

2024 Thurrock Council election: Aveley and Uplands
Party	Candidate	Votes	%	±%
Labour	Cathy Sisterson	1,235	63.1	+15.8
Conservative	Augustine Ononaji	721	36.9	–15.8
Majority		514	26.2	
Turnout		1,956	26	
Registered electors		7,523		
Labour gain from Conservative		Swing		

=== 2023 election ===
The election took place on 4 May 2023.

2023 Thurrock Council election: Aveley and Uplands
Party	Candidate	Votes	%	±%
Conservative	Jacqui Maney	928	52.7	+3.3
Labour	Cathy Sisterson	834	47.3	–3.3
Majority		96	5.4	N/A
Turnout		1,777	23.6	+0.3
Registered electors		7,519		
Conservative hold		Swing	▲3.3	

=== 2022 election ===
The election took place on 5 May 2022.

2022 Thurrock Council election: Aveley and Uplands
Party	Candidate	Votes	%	±%
Labour	Srikanth Panjala	877	50.6	+16.9
Conservative	David Van Day	857	49.4	−16.9
Majority		20		
Turnout		1,750	23.28	
Labour gain from Thurrock Ind.		Swing		
