= Neil Speight =

British journalist and politician

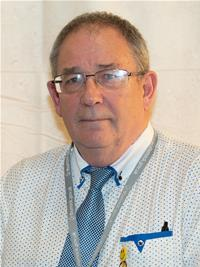
- Official portrait, 2023

Member of Thurrock Council for Stanford-le-Hope West
- Incumbent
- Assumed office 4 May 2023
- Preceded by: Shane Hebb
- Majority: 111 (6.5%)

Personal details
- Born: July 1958 (age 68) Yorkshire, England
- Party: Independent
- Other political affiliations: UKIP (2016); Conservative (before 2016)
- Education: University of Sheffield
- Occupation: Journalist, football manager, politician
- Website: Official website

Neil Speight (born July 1958) is a British journalist, football manager and politician who has served as the member of Thurrock Council for the ward of Stanford-le-Hope West since 2023 and the editor of Thurrock Nub News since 2019.

== Early life and career ==
Speight was born in July 1958. He is originally from Yorkshire, England, which is where he was raised. He studied at Richmond College and the University of Sheffield and qualified as a football referee. He began his career as a trainee reporter for the South Yorkshire Times in the 1970s. In his early career, Speight served as the editor of several regional publications, including the Wakefield Express, Suffolk Free Press, Holderness Gazette, Hornsea Gazette, and Scarborough Evening News. He also spent a period working for the Peterborough Evening Telegraph in Cambridgeshire, where he was sports editor and production editor.

In 2003, Speight was launch editor of the East Riding Gazette, a free quality broadsheet paper covering the East Riding of Yorkshire and western Hull. Speight explained that the paper's team had found a demand for "more competition" in the area as the existing local media there had "grown stale due to its monopoly position". The East Riding Gazette closed down two years later in 2005, though Speight had moved on . According to Speight, he gave up on the paper after the "powers that be were unable to sustain" his envisioned "high-quality editorial product".

== Career in Thurrock ==
In 2004, while still heading the East Riding Gazette, Speight moved to Thurrock in Essex where he became editor of the Thurrock Gazette, taking over from Andy Lever. During the 2004–05 Essex Senior Football League, Speight was appointed as a co-manager of Tilbury F.C. alongside Garry Kimble, where he also worked as the commercial manager and programme editor. In 2005, Speight and Kimble stood down after it was relegated from the Southern League Division One East. He joined the administrative team at Isthmian League East Thurrock United and eventually became club secretary, a role he held for many years as the club climbed the non-League ladder, culminating in three years in the National League South.

In 2005, Speight announced plans to leave Essex and return to Yorkshire, where he would take up a job for East Riding of Yorkshire Council editing local newspapers and managing the council's communications. However, he then changed his mind and remained in Thurrock as editor of the Thurrock Gazette, stating that he had been convinced to stay after he received an "overwhelming feeling of warmth and support" from the local community in Thurrock and the paper's publisher Newsquest Essex. He remained editor of the Thurrock Gazette until his departure from the paper in December 2008, during which period he became known for his combative style of reporting in the borough.

=== The Enquirer series ===
After leaving the Thurrock Gazette, Speight founded and edited the Enquirer series of local newspapers which had two editions, the Essex Enquirer and the East London Enquirer. In 2011, he expanded the series with the launch of the Thurrock Enquirer, which took on a more hyperlocal focus on the borough of Thurrock in particular.

In 2009, Speight became secretary of East Thurrock United F.C. In 2012, he proposed the construction of a new stadium at the Pegasus social club in Corringham, arguing that this would ensure its long term survival. He has also filled in as a referee during East Thurrock United games.

=== Political career ===
For most of his life, Speight was affiliated with the Conservative Party. In the late 2000s and 2010s, he was in talks with the local Conservative Party in Thurrock to stand as one of their candidates in the local elections, though he ultimately did not do so. Ahead of the 2016 Thurrock Council election, Speight announced that he would stand in the election for the UK Independence Party (UKIP) in the Conservative-held ward of Corringham and Fobbing. He said he thought the Conservative Party had "lost touch" with voters and needed a "kick up the backside" by candidates such as himself to get back into shape. He remained editor of the Thurrock Enquirer despite his political allegiance. At the election, Speight came in second place behind Aaron Watkins of the Conservative Party with 507 votes to Watkins' 753.

Speight stood once again in the 2021 Thurrock Council election, this time as an independent candidate in the ward of East Tilbury. His decision to stand in East Tilbury when he lived in Stanford-le-Hope was criticised by his incumbent Conservative opponent Sue Sammons, while local newspaper Your Thurrock also declared its opposition to a local journalist standing for election in an area they covered. Speight came second to Sammons in the election, winning 605 votes to Sammons' 639.

In the 2023 Thurrock Council election, Speight stood as an independent candidate in the ward of Stanford-le-Hope West, where he lived. He challenged the incumbent councillor, Shane Hebb of the Conservative Party, who served as the Thurrock Council cabinet member for finance when the council agreed financial deals which later led it to bankruptcy. Speight said he believed his home needed "an independent voice that represents residents, not party politics and personal gain" and maintained that he could remain "fair and honest" as a local journalist despite serving as a local councillor. Speight defeated Hebb at the election, winning 643 votes ahead of the 532 votes received by runner-up Phil Smith of the Labour Party. After his election, he remained editor of Thurrock Nub News, arguing that a local journalist such as himself was best placed to represent local residents on the council and insisting that his reporting had remained impartial since standing for election.

After his election to Thurrock Council, Speight became the leader and spokesperson of the Non-Political Alliance of Independent Councillors (NPAIC), which included most independents in the council.

In the 2024 general election, Speight stood as an independent candidate in his local parliamentary constituency of South Basildon and East Thurrock. He launched a crowdfunding campaign to finance his bid.

== Personal life ==
Speight lives in Stanford-le-Hope. He is the father of five children.
