= Jen Craft =

British politician

Jen Craft MP
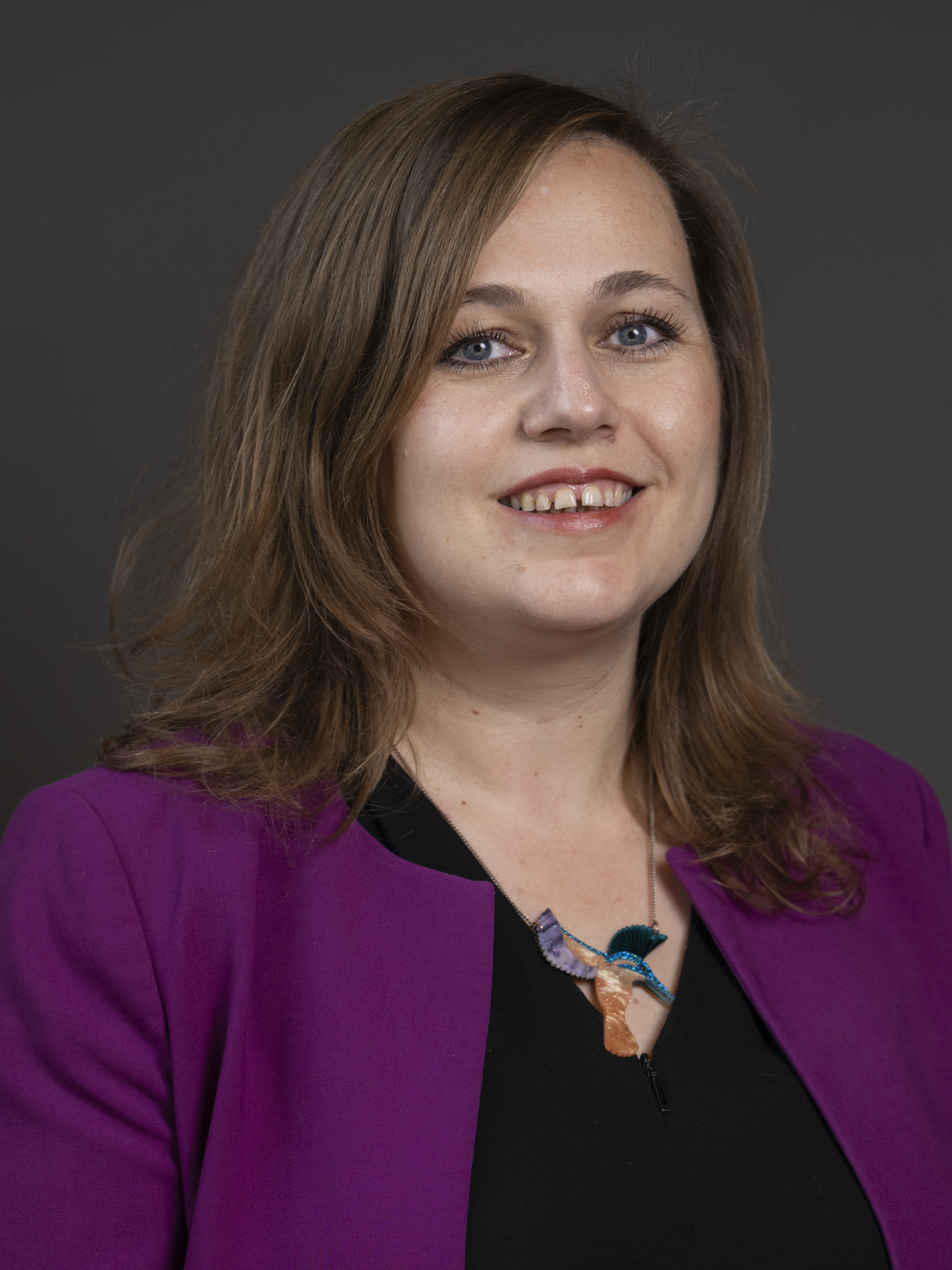
- Official portrait, 2024

Member of Parliament for Thurrock
- Incumbent
- Assumed office 4 July 2024
- Preceded by: Jackie Doyle-Price
- Majority: 6,474 (17.2%)

Personal details
- Born: 1985 or 1986 (age 40–41) Orsett, Essex, England
- Party: Labour
- Spouse: Alastair Craft
- Education: University of Leicester (BA)
- Website: www.jencraftmp.co.uk

Jennifer Craft (born 1985 or 1986) is a British Labour Party politician and former civil servant who has been Member of Parliament (MP) for Thurrock since 2024.

== Early life and career ==
Craft was born in 1985 or 1986 at Orsett Hospital in Orsett, Thurrock, England. She grew up in Grays, Thurrock and was educated at Grays Convent High School and Palmer's College. She studied politics and history at university. Before entering politics, she worked as a civil servant. She left the civil service to look after one of her children who has Down syndrome.

In an interview from 2023, Craft said her interest in politics was inspired by her mother, a GMB shop steward, and her children. A member of the Labour Party, she was Labour MP Margaret Hodge's campaign manager in the 2010 general election, managing her campaign to defeat the British National Party in the constituency of Barking. In the 2019 Thurrock Council election, she stood as the Labour candidate for the ward of Stifford Clays. She came in second place behind Jennifer Smith of the Thurrock Independents by 188 votes.

== Member of Parliament ==
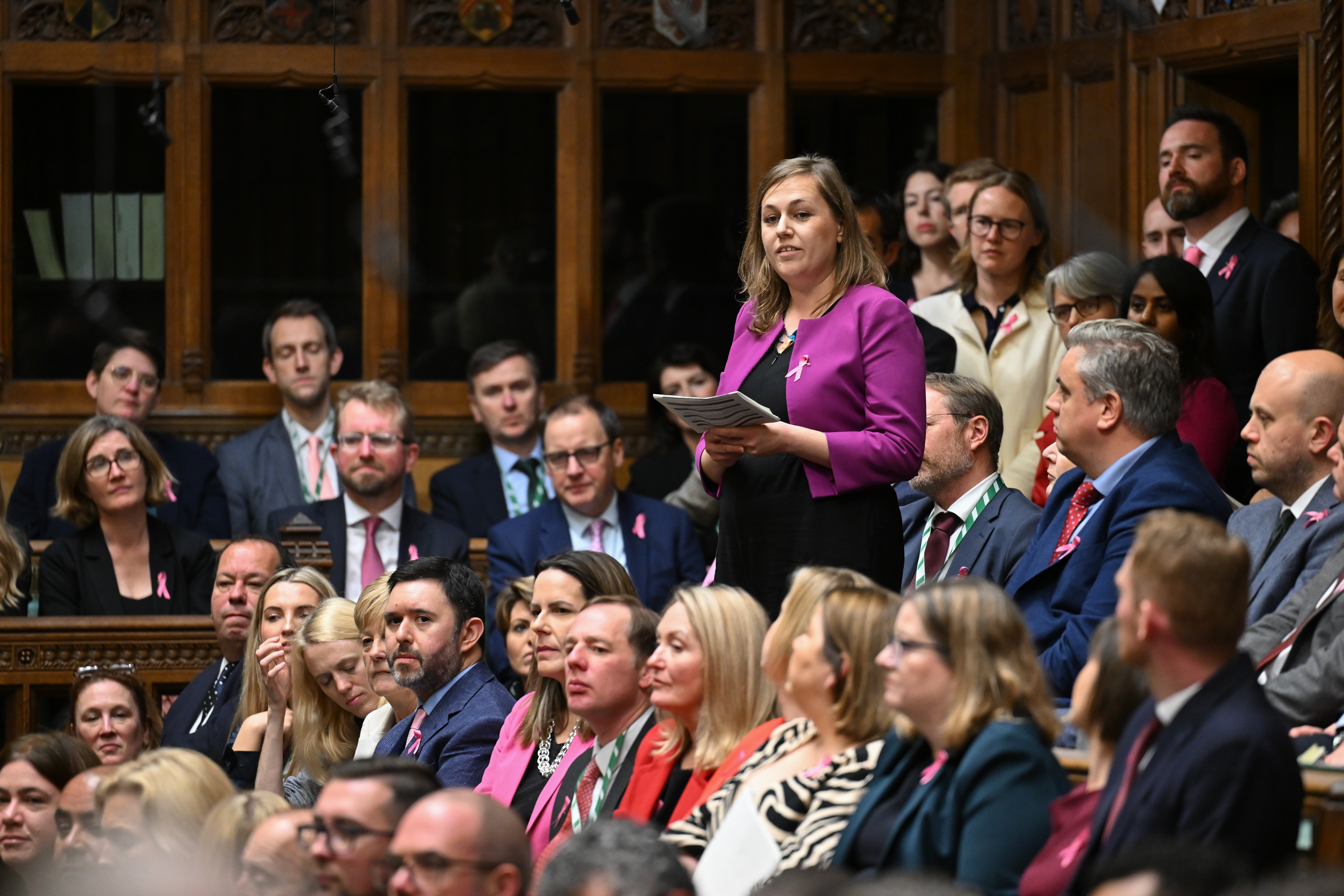
Craft speaking in the House of Commons during Prime Minister's Questions, 16 October 2024

In 2022, Craft was selected as the Labour Party's prospective parliamentary candidate for the constituency of Thurrock. She was chosen in a ballot of local party members, beating Thurrock Council Labour leader John Kent, former Basildon Council Labour leader Jack Ferguson and Ealing Council member Miriam Rice. She was convinced to run by her husband Alastair and applied for financial support from the organisation MotheRed to support her bid to become Labour's candidate in the seat. Her bid was supported by former Thurrock Council Labour leader Jane Pothecary, former Thurrock mayor Carl Morris and John Biggs, the former mayor of Tower Hamlets. She was also endorsed by several trade unions, including GMB, Community and USDAW.

After Prime Minister Rishi Sunak called the 2024 general election in May 2024, Craft said it was an opportunity for Labour to "unleash a decade of national renewal". She criticised the Conservative Party for presiding over the bankruptcy of Thurrock Council, which she said reflected the national situation under Sunak's Conservative government. Although optimistic, Craft warned that the election was "not a foregone conclusion" and pledged to "work hard for every single vote until the polls close" on election day. In the same month, she launched the party's six pledges for the election with Labour leader Keir Starmer. In that month, she campaigned in the constituency with Starmer and Labour frontbenchers Liz Kendall and Yvette Cooper.

At the general election on 4 July 2024, she defeated the incumbent Conservative MP Jackie Doyle-Price with 16,050 votes and was elected the new MP for Thurrock with a majority of 6,474 votes, or 17.2%, over Reform UK candidate Sophie Preston-Hall. Her election made her one of at least three disabled MPs who were first elected in 2024, alongside Labour MP Marie Tidball and Liberal Democrat MP Steve Darling. She was sworn in to Parliament on 11 July 2024 and made her maiden speech on 4 September 2024.

Since 2024, Craft has served as a member of the Health and Social Care Select Committee.

== Personal life ==
Craft lives in Grays with her family. Her husband is Alastair Craft, a consultant and Labour member who stood for the party in the 2024 Thurrock Council election. She is disabled, describing herself as having "long term mental health issues" in an interview from 2023, and is also a full-time caregiver for one of her children who has Down syndrome. She has obsessive–compulsive disorder and bipolar disorder, having been diagnosed with both by her 20s.

Parliament of the United Kingdom
Preceded by Jackie Doyle-Price	Member of Parliament for Thurrock; 2024–present	Incumbent
