= 2018 Thurrock Council election =

2018 UK local government election

← 2016	3 May 2018	2019 →

16 of the 49 seats to Thurrock Council 25 seats needed for a majority
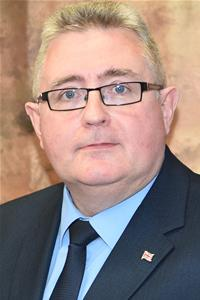

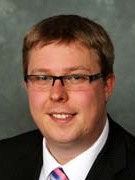

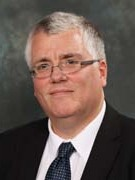
	First party	Second party	Third party
Leader	Rob Gledhill	Oliver Gerrish	Graham Snell
Party	Conservative	Labour	Thurrock Ind.
Leader's seat	Little Thurrock Rectory	West Thurrock & South Stifford	Stifford Clays (lost re-election)
Seats before	19	14	16
Seats won	6	9	1
Seats after	20	17	12
Seat change	▲1	▲3	▼4
- Map showing the results of the 2018 Thurrock Council election
Council control before election
No overall control
Council control after election
No overall control

The 2018 Thurrock Council elections took place on 3 May 2018 to elect members of Thurrock Council in England. Councillors in 16 out of the 20 electoral wards were to be up for election. The council remained under no overall control, with a minority Conservative administration running the council.

On 26 January 2018, all sitting UKIP councillors resigned from the party and formed a new opposition group called Thurrock Independents.

On 13 March 2018, Basildon UKIP announced that they had taken over responsibility for the 6 East Thurrock wards and are now called UKIP Basildon and Thurrock Branch.

Before the elections, there was a by-election held in Ockendon which resulted in a Conservative gain after a tie and drawing of lots.

== Council Composition ==
Going into the election, the composition of the council was:

19	16	14
Conservative	Thurrock Independent	Labour

After the election, the composition of the council was:

20	12	17
Conservative	Thurrock Independent	Labour

== Election results ==
Comparisons for the purpose of determining a gain, hold or loss of a seat, and for all percentage changes, is to the last time these specific seats were up for election in 2014.

Thurrock local election result 2018
Party	Seats	Gains	Losses	Net gain/loss	Seats %	Votes %	Votes	+/−
Labour	9	3	0	+3	56.3	41.9	12,381	+5.7
Conservative	6	3	1	+2	37.5	33.7	9,972	+12.1
Thurrock Ind.	1	0	4	-4	6.2	21.2	6,282	N/A
UKIP	0	0	5	-5	0	2.9	846	-36.1
Democrats and Veterans	0	0	0	0	0	0.3	94	N/A

== Ward results ==
All percentage changes are versus 2014, the last time the comparable set of wards was fought. Holds / Gains are given against control of ward going in to the 2018 elections.

=== Aveley & Uplands ===
Aveley & Uplands
Party	Candidate	Votes	%	±%
Thurrock Ind.	Tim Aker	1,037	43.2	▲2.3†
Conservative	David Van Day	653	27.2	▲6.0
Labour	Rafal Zak	570	23.7	▼0.5
UKIP	Peter Curtis	141	5.9	▼48.7
Majority		384	16.0	▼14.4
Turnout		2,401		
Thurrock Ind. hold		Swing	▼1.9	

† Percentage change calculated from the 2014 Aveley & Uplands by-election at which Aker was elected (as a UKIP candidate). He subsequently defected from the UKIP group on Thurrock council and formed Thurrock Independents, although he still sits as a UKIP MEP.

=== Belhus ===
Belhus
Party	Candidate	Votes	%	±%
Labour	Mike Fletcher	828	43.7	▲9.4
Thurrock Ind.	Chris Baker*	667	35.2	▼16.4†
Conservative	Georgette Polley	399	21.1	▲5.0
Majority		161	8.5	
Labour gain from Thurrock Ind.		Swing		

No UKIP candidate as previously (-49.6%).

† change calculated from the 2014 election when Baker was originally elected (as a UKIP candidate).

=== Chadwell St Mary ===
Chadwell St Mary 2018
Party	Candidate	Votes	%	±%
Labour	Barbara Rice (incumbent)	1,383	67	+23
Conservative	Paul Armold	402	20	+5
Thurrock Ind.	Paul Stevens	264	13	+13
Majority		981	47	
Labour hold		Swing	+9	

Note no UKIP as previously (-39%), no Lib Dem as previously (-2%)

=== Grays Riverside ===
Grays Riverside 2018
Party	Candidate	Votes	%	±%
Labour	Martin Kerin (incumbent)	1,063	56	+14
Conservative	Wendy Herd	488	26	+7
Thurrock Ind.	Shane McDonagh	343	18	+18
Majority		575	30	
Labour hold		Swing		

Note no UKIP candidate as previously (-34%)

=== Grays Thurrock ===
Grays Thurrock 2018
Party	Candidate	Votes	%	±%
Labour	Lynn Worrall	1,124	55	+13
Conservative	Evelina Vulpe	559	27	+9
Thurrock Ind.	Gillian Wardrop	362	18	+18
Majority		565		
Labour hold		Swing		

Note no UKIP candidate as previously (-36%)

=== Little Thurrock Blackshots ===
Little Thurrock Blackshots 2018
Party	Candidate	Votes	%	±%
Conservative	Ben Maney	1,073	59	+18
Labour	Jacqueline Dobson	471	26	+10
Thurrock Ind.	Oliver Smith	284	16	+16
Majority		602		
Conservative hold		Swing		

Note no UKIP candidate as previously (-39%)

=== Little Thurrock Rectory ===
Little Thurrock Rectory 2018
Party	Candidate	Votes	%	±%
Conservative	Robert Gledhill	842	55	+15
Labour	Lawson Akhigbe	486	32	+7
Thurrock Ind.	Jay Hayers	200	13	+13
Majority		356		
Conservative hold		Swing		

Note no UKIP candidate as previously (-32%)

=== Ockendon ===
Ockendon 2018
Party	Candidate	Votes	%	±%
Labour	Sue Shinnick	864	38	+17
Conservative	Romanus Nwakuna	740	33	+2
Thurrock Ind.	Jan Baker (incumbent)	663	29	+29
Majority		124		
Labour gain from Thurrock Ind.		Swing		

Note no UKIP as previously (-46%)

=== Orsett ===
Orsett 2018
Party	Candidate	Votes	%	±%
Conservative	Barry Johnson	1,091	65	+17
Labour	Vince Offord	290	17	+4
UKIP	Adrian Short	206	12	−24
Thurrock Ind.	James Mower	81	5	+5
Majority		801		
Conservative hold		Swing		

=== South Chafford ===
South Chafford 2018
Party	Candidate	Votes	%	±%
Labour	Abbie Akinbohun	685	48	+21
Conservative	Tunde Ojetola	647	45	+1
Thurrock Ind.	Torren Snell	105	7	+7
Majority		38	3	
Labour gain from Conservative		Swing		

Note no UKIP as previously (-26%)

=== Stanford East & Corringham Town ===
Stanford East & Corringham Town 2018
Party	Candidate	Votes	%	±%
Conservative	Alex Anderson	810	38	+5
Labour	George Elcock	636	30	+3
Thurrock Ind.	Roy Jones (incumbent)	565	26	+26
UKIP	Michael Keal	132	6	−35
Majority		174		
Conservative gain from Thurrock Ind.		Swing		

=== Stifford Clays ===
Stifford Clays 2018
Party	Candidate	Votes	%	±%
Conservative	Elizabeth Rigby	804	44	+18
Labour	Lee Watson	668	36	+1
UKIP	Stephen Andrews	195	11	−27
Thurrock Ind.	Graham Snell	177	10	+10
Majority		136		
Conservative gain from Thurrock Ind.		Swing		

=== The Homesteads ===
The Homesteads 2018
Party	Candidate	Votes	%	±%
Conservative	James Halden (incumbent)	1,233	49	+6
Thurrock Ind.	Gary Byrne	575	23	+10.5^{1}
Labour	Daniel Friday Chukwu	532	21	+2
UKIP	Peter Prendegast	172	7	−31
Majority		658		
Conservative hold		Swing		

a.^{1} Gary Byrne stood as an independent in the 2016 election for the same seat, achieving 12.5% of the vote. The change in this table is calculated from this result, though he is now a candidate for the Thurrock Independents.

=== Tilbury Riverside & Thurrock Park ===
Tilbury St Chads 2018
Party	Candidate	Votes	%	±%
Labour	Bukky Okunade (incumbent)	563	45	+7
Thurrock Ind.	Allen Mayes	528	42	+42
Conservative	Elaine Parker	159	13	−7
Majority		35		
Turnout				
Labour hold		Swing		

Note no UKIP candidate as previously (-36%)

=== Tilbury St Chads ===
Tilbury St Chads 2018
Party	Candidate	Votes	%	±%
Labour	Steve Liddiard (incumbent)	558	58	+14
Thurrock Ind.	Paul Martin	240	25	+25
Conservative	Steve Minett	169	17	+4
Majority		318		
Turnout				
Labour hold		Swing		

Note no UKIP candidate as previously (-42%)

=== West Thurrock & South Stifford ===
West Thurrock & South Stifford 2018
Party	Candidate	Votes	%	±%
Labour	Qaisar Abbas	1,058	57	+10
Conservative	George Coxshall	505	27	+12
Thurrock Ind.	Michael Wager	191	10	+10
Democrats and Veterans	Christopher Boosey	94	5	+5
Majority		553		
Labour hold		Swing		

Note no UKIP candidate as previously (-34%)
