= Jackie Doyle-Price =

British politician (born 1969)

Dame Jackie Doyle-Price DBE
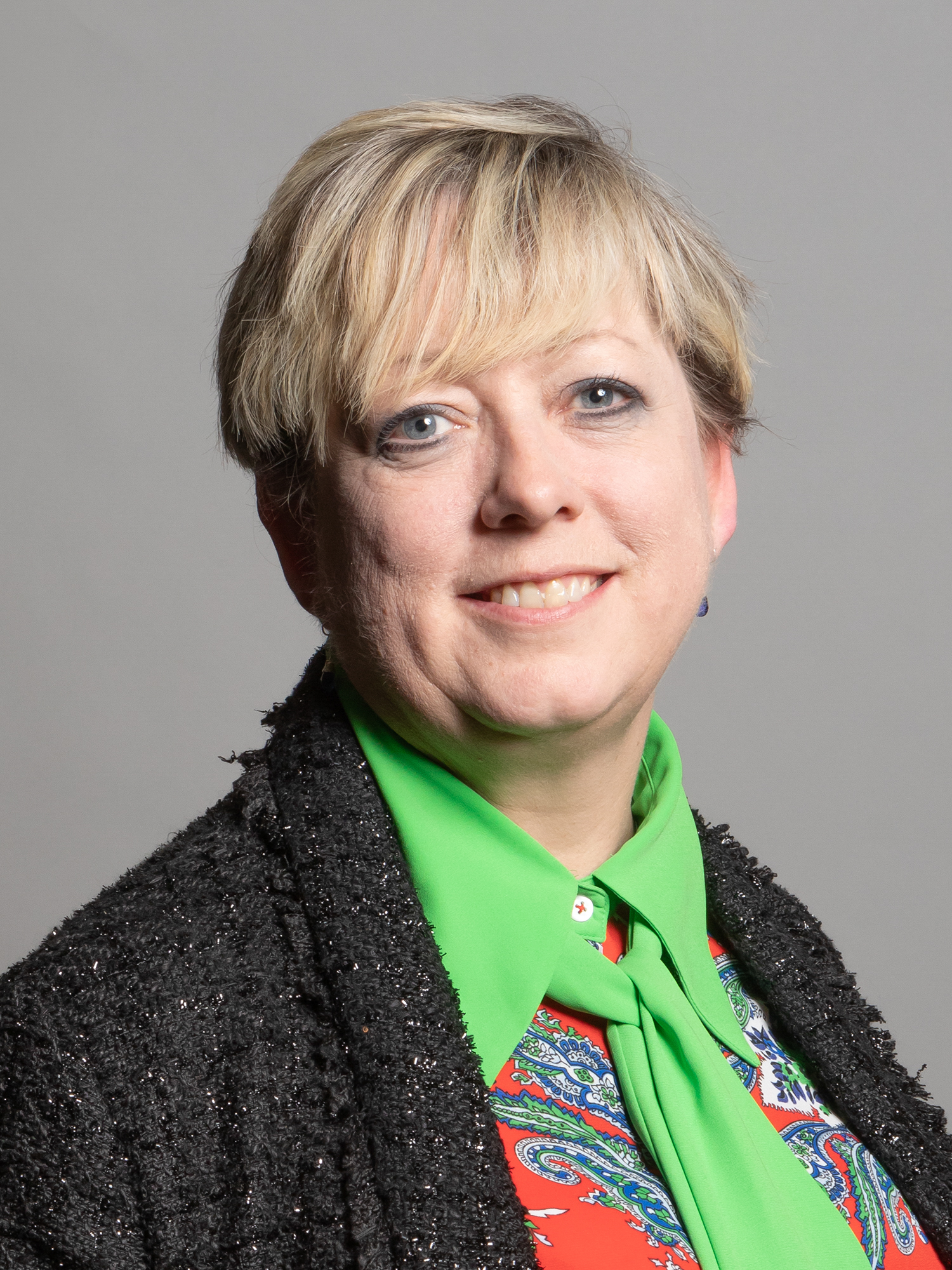
- Official portrait, 2020

Chair of the Public Administration and Constitutional Affairs Select Committee
- In office 8 May 2024 – 30 May 2024
- Preceded by: William Wragg
- Succeeded by: Simon Hoare

Minister of State for Industry
- In office 7 September 2022 – 27 October 2022
- Prime Minister: Liz Truss
- Preceded by: Lee Rowley (Note: As Parliamentary Under-Secretary of State for Business and Industry. Office vacant between 6 July and 7 September 2022.)
- Succeeded by: Nus Ghani

Parliamentary Under-Secretary of State for Mental Health, Inequalities and Suicide Prevention (Note: Parliamentary Under-Secretary of State for Mental Health and Inequalities (2017–2018).)
- In office 14 June 2017 – 27 July 2019
- Prime Minister: Theresa May
- Preceded by: Office established
- Succeeded by: Nadine Dorries

Assistant Government Whip
- In office 13 May 2015 – 14 June 2017
- Prime Minister: David Cameron; Theresa May
- Preceded by: Office established
- Succeeded by: Chloe Smith

Member of Parliament for Thurrock
- In office 6 May 2010 – 30 May 2024
- Preceded by: Andrew MacKinlay
- Succeeded by: Jen Craft

Personal details
- Born: Jacqueline Doyle-Price; 5 August 1969 (age 57) Sheffield, South Yorkshire, England
- Party: Conservative
- Spouse: Mark Coxshall
- Education: University College, Durham (BA)
- Website: Official website

Dame Jacqueline Doyle-Price DBE (born 5 August 1969) is a British former Conservative Party politician and former civil servant who was member of parliament (MP) for Thurrock from 2010 to 2024. She was first elected as MP in the 2010 general election and was defeated in the 2024 general election.

In September 2022, she was appointed minister of state for industry by Prime Minister Liz Truss, and returned to the back benches following the appointment of Rishi Sunak as prime minister in October 2022.

== Early life and education ==
Jacqueline Doyle-Price was born on 5 August 1969 on a council estate in Sheffield. Growing up in an apolitical working class family, her father Brian was a bricklayer whilst her mother Kathleen worked part-time as a sales assistant at Woolworths. She was raised in the suburbs of Hillsborough and Wisewood. She attended Notre Dame Roman Catholic High School, a comprehensive school.

Doyle-Price's interest in politics began when she was 14 years old. Her parents attempted to buy their council house through Margaret Thatcher's Right to Buy scheme and faced resistance from the left-wing Sheffield City Council, which was run by the Labour Party under the local leadership of David Blunkett. Doyle-Price claimed that its “left-wing councillors” did "everything they could to bully my parents into not buying their council house", and one of her teachers encouraged her to build upon her new-found interest and participate in politics, suggesting that she "go out and participate in democracy". Following the council's alleged "intimidation of her parents", Doyle-Price joined the Conservatives to campaign for people to buy their council homes in 1986.

Doyle-Price read economics and politics at Durham University. Her constituent college was University College. At Durham, she participated in political activism and joined its student Conservative Association where she worked as an officer with Graham Brady, who would later become a Conservative MP in 1997. Doyle-Price graduated in 1991.

== Career before parliament ==
Shortly after graduating from university, Doyle-Price became a researcher before spending 18 months moving between temporary jobs and unemployment. In 1992, she was employed by South Yorkshire Police as an administrative officer, which became her first permanent job. She also worked for Sheffield Enterprise Agency. From 1993 to 2000, after working for South Yorkshire Police, she was employed at City of London Corporation as an assistant parliamentary officer, and from 2000 to 2005 she was an assistant private secretary to the Lord Mayor of the City of London. From 2005, she worked as an associate policy adviser and consumer advocate for the Financial Services Authority, leaving this job in 2010 to stand for parliament in Thurrock.

Doyle-Price held several posts in the Conservative Party before her election to parliament. From 1994 to 1997, she was Treasurer of the National Association of Conservative Graduates, and she sat on its national executive. In the 1997 general election, the national party employed her as a press secretary, and from 1997 to 1998 she served as the chairwoman of the Lewisham Deptford Conservative Association. She was constituency officer of the Greenwich and Woolwich Conservatives from 2006 to 2007 and stood unsuccessfully for election to Greenwich Council.

== Parliamentary career ==
Doyle-Price first stood for election to parliament in the 2005 general election, where she was the Conservative candidate for Sheffield Hillsborough and came third with 15.02% of the vote behind the Labour MP Angela Smith and the Liberal Democrat candidate.

At the 2010 general election, Doyle-Price was elected as MP for Thurrock with 36.8% of the vote and a majority of 92.

Doyle-Price made her maiden speech on 28 June 2010, speaking about the need for welfare reform. She was prepared to publicly challenge ministers on behalf of her constituents, particularly on transport issues connected to the Dartford Crossing and on the Government postponement of work to improve Junction 30 of the M25.

In May 2012 she was elected Chairman of the All-Party Gurkha Welfare Group.

In May 2013 Doyle-Price voted against same-sex marriage on its third reading in the House of Commons, having abstained at the second reading. Doyle-Price stated after the vote that whilst she supported equality for same-sex couples, she regarded marriage as a sacrament, and would have voted in favour of a bill which "sought to equalise civil partnership with civil marriage". She also stated that she would reconsider her position if the bill was amended.

Doyle-Price was a co-sponsor of the private member's EU membership referendum bill that was given a second reading on 5 July 2013. On 14 January 2014, she led a debate in Westminster Hall on options for the new Lower Thames Crossing.

At the 2015 general election, Doyle-Price was re-elected as MP for Thurrock with a decreased vote share of 33.7% and a majority of 536.

Doyle-Price was opposed to Brexit prior to the 2016 EU membership referendum.

In the House of Commons she has sat on the Public Accounts Committee and Committee of Selection and Women and Equalities Committee.

At the snap 2017 general election, Doyle-Price was again re-elected, with an increased vote share of 39.5% and a decreased majority of 345.

At the 2019 general election, Doyle-Price was again re-elected, with an increased vote share of 58.6% and an increased majority of 11,482.

In July 2020, Doyle-Price was critical of the availability of what she described as "dangerous" gender-affirming healthcare for trans children. Earlier in the year on International Women's Day, Doyle-Price suggested in parliament that new legislation was needed to strengthen the provisions for single-sex spaces under the Equality Act 2010.

In December 2020, following the revelation that Eddie Izzard had asked to be referred to with she/her pronouns, Doyle-Price stated in regard to Izzard that: "Being a straight man who likes to cross dress is not being a lesbian in a man's body. No man with respect for women would appropriate female same-sex attraction for themselves."

In May 2024, Doyle-Price was reported to be among the senior Tory MPs who supported establishing a duty of candour for senior civil servants.

=== Ministerial roles ===
Following the 2015 general election, Doyle-Price was appointed as an assistant whip.

Following the 2017 general election, Doyle-Price was appointed Parliamentary Under-Secretary of State for Mental Health and Inequalities in the Department for Health. In October 2018, she given additional ministerial responsibility for suicide prevention and co-chaired the Women's Mental Health Taskforce. She left the government following the election of Boris Johnson as leader of the Conservative Party, but returned to government as Minister of State for Industry when Liz Truss was elected as prime minister in September 2022. She left the government again following Rishi Sunak's appointment as prime minister.

== Post-parliamentary career ==
Following her defeat at the 2024 general election, Doyle has worked as a Strategic Adviser at public affairs consultancy GNL Strategic Limited. Doyle is also a trainer at the Civil Service College. She contested a by-election in the Roman Bank and Peckover division of Cambridgeshire, but lost to the Reform candidate.

== Personal life ==
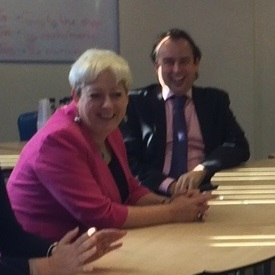
Doyle-Price and Mark Coxshall at William Edwards School in 2014

Doyle-Price lives in Purfleet, Thurrock. Her husband Mark Coxshall served as the Conservative leader of Thurrock Council from 2022 to 2023. They have a son, George Coxshall, who is also a Conservative Thurrock councillor and has served as leader of the Thurrock Conservatives since 2025.

Doyle-Price employed her husband Mark Coxshall as her Office Manager on a salary up to £45,000. The practice of MPs employing family members has been criticised by some sections of the media on the lines that it promotes nepotism. Although MPs who were first elected in the 2017 general election have been banned from employing family members, the restriction were not retrospective – meaning that Doyle-Price's employment of her husband was lawful.

Doyle-Price is a close friend of former prime minister Liz Truss, and she endorsed her successful campaign in the July–September 2022 Conservative Party leadership election to succeed Boris Johnson as prime minister. In 1997, during her tenure as its chairwoman, Doyle-Price introduced Truss to the Lewisham Deptford Conservative Association, which Truss herself would also chair from 1998 to 2000.

Doyle-Price is a Roman Catholic.

== Honours ==
Doyle-Price was appointed Dame Commander of the Order of the British Empire (DBE) on 29 December 2023 in the Truss's resignation honours list, for public and political service as Minister of State for Industry and as MP for Thurrock.

== Notes ==
Parliament of the United Kingdom
Preceded by Andrew MacKinlay	Member of Parliament for Thurrock; 2010–2024	Succeeded by Jen Craft
