= 2015 Thurrock Council election =

2015 UK local government election

Thurrock Council election, 2015
← 2014	7 May 2015	2016 →

16 of the 49 seats to Thurrock Council 25 seats needed for a majority
	First party	Second party	Third party
Party	Labour	Conservative	UKIP
Seats won	4	5	7
Seats after	18	17	13
Seat change	▼5	▼1	▲7
	Fourth party
Party	Independent
Seats won	0
Seats after	1
Seat change	▼1
- Results of the 2015 Thurrock Council election
Council control before election
No overall control
Council control after election
No overall control

The 2015 Thurrock Council election took place on 7 May 2015 to elect members of Thurrock Council in England. This was on the same day as the general election and other local elections. Elections were held in 16 wards for seats that were last contested in 2011, to elect roughly one third of the council.

Following the election, the Labour minority administration continued in government.

== Result ==
Thurrock local election result 2015
Party	Seats	Gains	Losses	Net gain/loss	Seats %	Votes %	Votes	+/−
UKIP	7	7	0	+7	43.8	35.8	21,735	
Conservative	5	0	1	-1	31.2	29.3	17,823	
Labour	4	0	5	-5	25	32.1	19,524	
Liberal Democrats	0	0	0	0	0	0.2	139	
Independent	0	0	1	-1	0	2.5	1541	

== Council Composition ==
Prior to the election the composition of the council was:

↓
23	18	6	2
Labour	Conservative	UKIP	I

After the election the composition of the council was:

↓
18	17	13	1
Labour	Conservative	UKIP	I

I - Independent

== Results by ward ==
Each of the 16 wards elected one councillor for this election. Incumbent councillors are marked by an asterisk.

=== Aveley & Uplands ===
Aveley & Uplands
Party	Candidate	Votes	%	±%
UKIP	Peter Smith	1,598	40.1	+16.6
Conservative	Teresa Dawn Webster	1,120	28.1	+0.2
Labour	John O'Regan	896	22.5	+0.4
Independent	John Livermore	373	9.3	N/A
Majority		478	12.0	
Turnout		3,987	61.0	+25.8
UKIP gain from Conservative		Swing		

=== Belhus ===
Belhus
Party	Candidate	Votes	%	±%
UKIP	Graham Hamilton	1,749	44.3	+29.3
Labour	Charles John Curtis*	1,366	34.6	−17.1
Conservative	John Frederick Biddall	833	21.1	+1.5
Majority		383	9.7	
Turnout		3,948	57.5	+26.9
UKIP gain from Labour		Swing		

=== Chadwell St. Mary ===
Chadwell St. Mary
Party	Candidate	Votes	%	±%
UKIP	Russell Cherry	1,967	44.2	+32.3
Labour	Susan Joyce Shinnick	1,518	34.1	−19.2
Conservative	Lee Dove	968	21.7	−2.0
Majority		449	10.1	
Turnout		4,453	62.3	+31.3
UKIP gain from Labour		Swing		

=== Chafford & North Stifford ===
Chafford & North Stifford
Party	Candidate	Votes	%	±%
Conservative	Mark Steven Coxshall	1,491	42.0	−13.2
Labour	Michael Bullion	1,096	30.9	+2.0
UKIP	James Mower	960	27.1	+19.4
Majority		395	11.1	
Turnout		3,547	65.9	+36.7
Conservative hold		Swing		

Coxshall previously served as Councillor for the Corringham & Fobbing ward from 2011-2015.

=== Corringham & Fobbing ===
Corringham & Fobbing
Party	Candidate	Votes	%	±%
Conservative	Deborah Carol Stewart	1,279	41.3	−5.3
UKIP	Clive Herbert Broad	1,078	34.8	+20.0
Labour	Theresa Wodehouse	741	23.9	−10.2
Majority		201	6.5	
Turnout		3,098	71.0	+27.0
Conservative hold		Swing		

=== East Tilbury ===
East Tilbury
Party	Candidate	Votes	%	±%
UKIP	James Nicholas Baker	1,004	33.7	+27.4
Independent	John Ronald Purkiss*	951	31.9	−25.8
Labour	Dorothy Millicent Turner	529	17.8	−1.4
Conservative	Steven Ronnie Scott Cole	496	16.6	+3.3
Majority		53	1.8	
Turnout		2,980	64.0	+30.4
UKIP gain from Independent		Swing		

=== Grays Riverside ===
Grays Riverside
Party	Candidate	Votes	%	±%
Labour	Jane Catherine Pothecary	1,721	42.0	−10.8
UKIP	Daniel Jukes	1,226	29.9	+23.6
Conservative	Jack Edwin Barnes	1,012	24.7	−1.5
Liberal Democrats	Kevin Barry Mulroue	139	3.4	−2.8
Majority		495	12.1	
Turnout		4,098	55.0	+27.8
Labour hold		Swing		

=== Grays Thurrock ===
Grays Thurrock
Party	Candidate	Votes	%	±%
Labour	Catherine Angela Kent*	1,794	43.5	−9.3
UKIP	Michael Heaver	1,323	32.0	+23.8
Conservative	Adam Carter	1,013	24.5	−1.3
Majority		471	11.5	
Turnout		4,130	65.0	+28.9
Labour hold		Swing		

=== Little Thurrock Rectory ===
Little Thurrock Rectory
Party	Candidate	Votes	%	±%
Conservative	Thomas Anthony Kelly*	1,204	38.6	−8.3
UKIP	Michael Wager	1,078	34.6	+22.8
Labour	Vincent William Offord	837	26.8	−11.4
Majority		126	4.0	
Turnout		3,119	68.7	+13.0
Conservative hold		Swing		

=== Ockendon ===
Ockendon
Party	Candidate	Votes	%	±%
UKIP	Kevin Wheeler	1,991	44.1	+35.6
Conservative	Benjamin Robert Gadsby	1,297	28.8	−9.5
Labour	Anthony William Fish	1,224	27.1	−14.5
Majority		694	15.3	
Turnout		4,512	64.4	+25.5
UKIP gain from Labour		Swing		

=== Stanford East & Corringham Town ===
Stanford East & Corringham Town
Party	Candidate	Votes	%	±%
UKIP	Colin Churchman	1,653	40.5	+22.0
Conservative	Gary Allen Collins	1,362	33.3	−3.5
Labour	Philip George Smith*	1,072	26.2	−15.8
Majority		291	7.2	
Turnout		4,087	63.6	+22.7
UKIP gain from Labour		Swing		

=== Stanford-Le-Hope West ===
Stanford-Le-Hope West
Party	Candidate	Votes	%	±%
Conservative	Shane Steven Hebb*	1,308	42.9	+3.4
UKIP	Alan David Broad	946	31.1	+10.6
Labour	Elizabeth Vine	791	26.0	−9.9
Majority		362	11.8	
Turnout		3,045	65.9	+26.8
Conservative hold		Swing		

=== Stifford Clays ===
Stifford Clays
Party	Candidate	Votes	%	±%
UKIP	Leslie Gamester	1,452	41.6	+17.1
Labour	Eleanor Lowe	1,075	30.8	−14.3
Conservative	Michelle Ditol Macadangdang	962	27.6	+0.7
Majority		377	10.8	
Turnout		3,489	68.7	+28.3
UKIP gain from Labour		Swing		

=== The Homesteads ===
The Homesteads
Party	Candidate	Votes	%	±%
Conservative	Pauline Maria Tolson*	1,967	42.4	−0.8
UKIP	Stephen John Andrews	1,446	31.1	+15.0
Labour	Linda Kathleen Hall	1,013	21.8	−13.3
Independent	Gary James Byrne	217	4.7	N/A
Majority		521	11.3	
Turnout		4,643	71.0	25.5
Conservative hold		Swing		

=== Tilbury Riverside & Thurrock Park ===
Tilbury Riverside & Thurrock Park
Party	Candidate	Votes	%	±%
Labour	Clare Esther Baldwin*	1,032	40.7	−9.0
UKIP	Charlotte Compton	1,027	40.5	N/A
Conservative	Scott James Benton	477	18.8	+7.0
Majority		5	0.2	
Turnout		2,536	58.4	+28.1
Labour hold		Swing		

=== West Thurrock & South Stifford ===
West Thurrock & South Stifford
Party	Candidate	Votes	%	±%
Labour	Victoria Claire Holloway*	2,009	45.9	−5.7
UKIP	Sarah Curtis	1,237	28.9	N/A
Conservative	John Francis Rowles	1,034	24.2	−7.7
Majority		772	18.0	
Turnout		4,280	56.0	27.5
Labour hold		Swing		
