= 2019 Thurrock Council election =

English local election

← 2018	2 May 2019	2021 →

16 of the 49 seats to Thurrock Council 25 seats needed for a majority
- Turnout: 26.88%
	First party	Second party	Third party
Party	Conservative	Labour	Thurrock Ind.
Seats before	23	17	9
Seats after	22	17	9
Seat change	-1	0	0
	Fourth party
Party	Independent
Seats before	0
Seats after	1
Seat change	+1
Council control before election
No overall control
Council control after election
No overall control

The 2019 Thurrock Council election was held on 2 May 2019 to elect members of the Thurrock Council in England.

== Election ==
A third of the seats were elected on 2 May 2019. Prior to the election, the council was under no overall control, governed by a minority Conservative administration. They held 23 of 49 seats, while Labour held 17 seats, followed by the Thurrock Independents on 9 seats.

Elections were held in a total of sixteen wards, with Conservative, Labour, and Thurrock Independent candidates standing in each ward. UKIP stood two candidates. The Green Party, the Liberal Democrats, and the British Union & Sovereignty Party stood one candidate each in Chafford & North Stifford, Grays Riverside, and Belhus respectively. There were also two independents standing for election in Thurrock.

== Results summary ==
Map showing the winner in each ward for the 2019 Thurrock Borough Council election

Changes in vote share are calculated from the 2015 election result, which was the last time this set of wards was up for election.

Prior to the election one seat was vacant.

2019 Thurrock Council election
Party	This election			Full council			This election		
Party	Seats	Net	Seats %	Other	Total	Total %	Votes	Votes %	+/−
Conservative	6	▼1	35.3	16	22	44.9	8,922	31.7	▲2.4
Labour	5	▲1	29.4	12	17	34.7	8,895	31.6	▼0.5
Thurrock Ind.	5	Steady	29.4	4	9	18.4	8,163	29.0	New
Independent	1	▲1	5.9	0	1	2.0	1,274	4.5	▲2.0
Liberal Democrats	0	Steady	0.0	0	0	0.0	399	1.4	▲1.2
UKIP	0	Steady	0.0	0	0	0.0	344	1.2	▼34.6
Green	0	Steady	0.0	0	0	0.0	145	0.5	New

== Ward results ==
=== Aveley & Uplands ===
Aveley & Uplands, 2 May 2019
Party	Candidate	Votes	%	±%
Conservative	Colin Churchman	660	43.8	+16.6
Thurrock Ind.	Peter Smith*	513	34.1	−9.1
Labour	Charlie Curtis	333	22.1	−1.6

=== Belhus ===
Belhus, 2 May 2019
Party	Candidate	Votes	%	±%
Thurrock Ind.	Chris Baker	670	38.7	+3.5
Labour	Lee Watson	660	38.1	−5.6
Conservative	Romanus Nwakuma	255	14.7	−6.4
Union & Sovereignty	Dave Bradshaw	148	8.5	N/A

=== Chadwell St. Mary ===
Chadwell St. Mary, 2 May 2019
Party	Candidate	Votes	%	±%
Labour	Daniel Chukwu	863	56.2	−10.8
Labour	Sara Muldowney	783	51.0	−16.0
Thurrock Ind.	Steve Minett	488	31.8	+18.8
Thurrock Ind.	Stacey Clark	456	29.7	+16.7
Conservative	Georgette Polley	301	19.6	+0.2
Conservative	Paul Polley	267	17.4	−2.0
Independent	Stephen Andrews	142	9.2	N/A

=== Chafford & North Stifford ===
Chafford & North Stifford, 2 May 2019
Party	Candidate	Votes	%	±%
Conservative	Mark Coxshall*	624	47.5	+2.2
Labour	Rafal Zak	354	26.9	−6.3
Thurrock Ind.	Graham Hamilton*	190	14.5	N/A
Green	Julian Puttergill	145	11.0	N/A

Hamilton served as a councillor for Belhus Ward prior to the election.

=== Corringham & Fobbing ===
Corringham & Fobbing, 2 May 2019
Party	Candidate	Votes	%	±%
Conservative	Deborah Huelin*	848	59.8	+12.7
Labour	John Cecil	316	22.3	+1.1
Thurrock Ind.	Gbenga Olajugbagbe	255	18.0	N/A

=== East Tilbury ===
East Tilbury, 2 May 2019
Party	Candidate	Votes	%	±%
Independent	Fraser Massey	984	62.6	N/A
UKIP	Michael Keal	196	12.5	−46.0
Conservative	Glenn Stanley	161	10.2	−7.8
Labour	Jacqueline Dobson	158	10.0	−11.5
Thurrock Ind.	Oliver Smith	74	4.7	N/A

=== Grays Riverside ===
Grays Riverside, 2 May 2019
Party	Candidate	Votes	%	±%
Labour	Jane Pothecary	800	46.6	−9.4
Liberal Democrats	Kevin McNamara	399	23.3	N/A
Conservative	Gurjit Thandi	299	17.4	−8.6
Thurrock Ind.	Kanlayani Sisasima	218	12.7	−5.3

=== Grays Thurrock ===
Grays Thurrock, 2 May 2019
Party	Candidate	Votes	%	±%
Labour	Catherine Kent	925	49.2	−5.8
Conservative	James Thandi	513	27.2	+0.2
Thurrock Ind.	Shelby Mayes	445	23.6	+5.6

=== Little Thurrock ===
Little Thurrock, 2 May 2019
Party	Candidate	Votes	%	±%
Conservative	Tom Kelly*	586	40.4	−14.6
Thurrock Ind.	Russell Cherry*	426	29.4	+16.4
Labour	Les Strange	289	19.9	−12.1
UKIP	Neil Rivett	148	10.2	N/A

Cherry was a councillor for Chadwell St Mary Ward prior to the election.

=== Ockendon ===
Ockendon, 2 May 2019
Party	Candidate	Votes	%	±%
Conservative	Andrew Jefferies	982	41.1	+8.1
Labour	Ruth Clapham	745	31.2	−6.8
Thurrock Ind.	Jan Baker	663	27.7	−1.3

=== Stanford East & Corringham Town ===
Stanford East & Corringham Town, 2 May 2019
Party	Candidate	Votes	%	±%
Thurrock Ind.	Shane Ralph	812	42.4	+16.4
Conservative	Roy Jones	709	37.0	−1.0
Labour	Carl Morris	394	20.6	−9.4

=== Stanford-le-Hope West ===
Stanford-le-Hope West, 2 May 2019
Party	Candidate	Votes	%	±%
Conservative	Shane Hebb	921	61.1	+18.3
Thurrock Ind.	Michael Fawcett	313	20.8	N/A
Labour	Clifford Holloway	274	18.1	−9.3

=== Stifford Clays ===
Stifford Clays, 2 May 2019
Party	Candidate	Votes	%	±%
Thurrock Ind.	Jennifer Smith	610	38.4	+28.4
Labour	Jennifer Craft	492	31.0	−5.0
Conservative	Graham Snell	485	30.6	−13.4

=== The Homesteads ===
The Homesteads, 2 May 2019
Party	Candidate	Votes	%	±%
Thurrock Ind.	Gary Byrne	960	42.9	+19.9
Conservative	Paul Arnold	946	42.3	−6.7
Labour	Dan Norton	328	14.7	−6.3

=== Tilbury Riverside & Thurrock Park ===
Tilbury Riverside & Thurrock Park, 2 May 2019
Party	Candidate	Votes	%	±%
Thurrock Ind.	Allen Mayes	712	57.2	+15.2
Labour	Clare Baldwin*	429	34.5	−10.5
Conservative	Daryl Palmer	103	8.3	−4.7

=== West Thurrock & South Stifford ===
West Thurrock & South Stifford, 2 May 2019
Party	Candidate	Votes	%	±%
Labour	Victoria Holloway	752	54.8	−2.2
Thurrock Ind.	Jimmy Mower	358	26.1	+16.1
Conservative	Joseph Kaley	262	19.1	−8.9
