= 2016 Thurrock Council election =

2016 UK local government election

Thurrock Council election, 2016
← 2015	5 May 2016	2018 →

17 of the 49 seats to Thurrock Council 25 seats needed for a majority
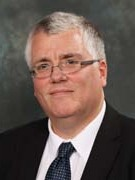

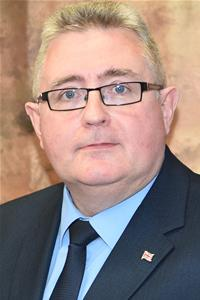

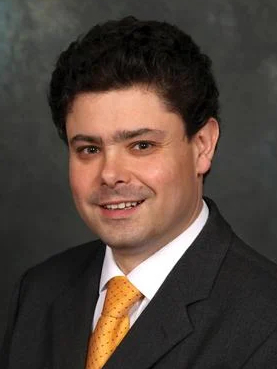
	First party	Second party	Third party
Leader	Graham Snell	Rob Gledhill	John Kent
Party	UKIP	Conservative	Labour
Seats won	6	7	11
Seats after	17	17	14
Seat change	▲6	Steady	▼1
	Fourth party
Party	Independent
Seats won	0
Seats after	1
Seat change	▼2
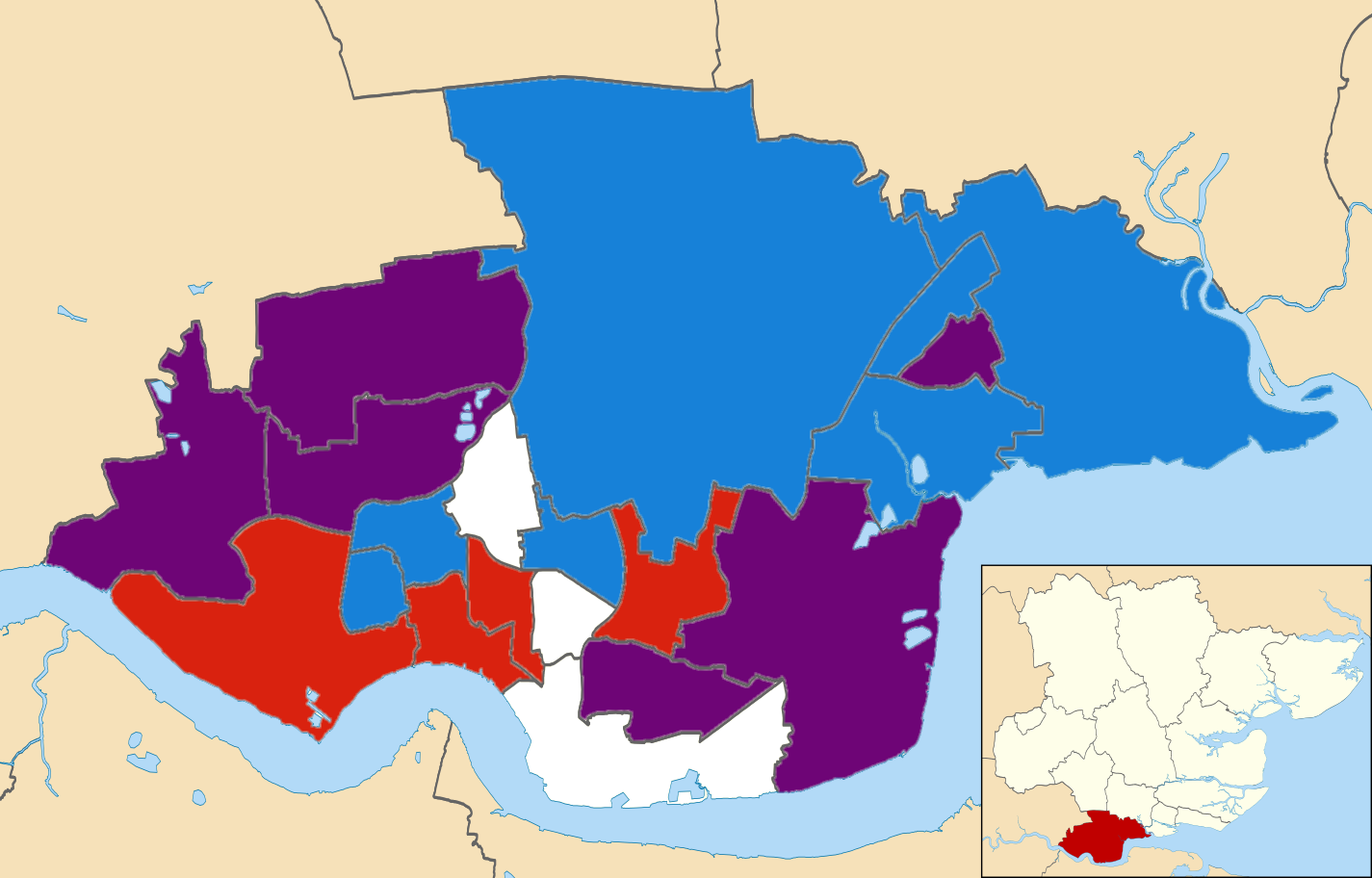
- Map showing the results of contested wards in the 2016 Thurrock Council elections.
Council control before election
No overall control
Council control after election
No overall control

The 2016 Thurrock Council election took place on 5 May 2016 to elect members of Thurrock Council in England. This was on the same day as other local elections.

The council remained under no overall control. The Labour leader of the council, John Kent, resigned at the subsequent annual meeting of the council. The leader of the Conservative group, Rob Gledhill, was elected leader of the council instead.

== Results summary ==
Thurrock Borough Council election, 2016
Party	Seats	Gains	Losses	Net gain/loss	Seats %	Votes %	Votes	+/−
UKIP	17	4	0	▲4		38.8	11,922	+2.5
Conservative	17	1	1	Steady		28.3	8,683	-1.4
Labour	14	0	4	▼4		31.7	9,731	+0.5
Independent	0	0	0	Steady		1.3	395	-1.3

== Overall results ==
At the previous election the composition of the council was:

18	17	13	1
Labour	Conservative	UKIP	I

After the election the composition of the council was:

17	17	14	1
UKIP	Conservative	Labour	I

I - Independent

== Ward results ==
=== Aveley & Uplands ===
Aveley & Uplands 2016
Party	Candidate	Votes	%	±%
UKIP	Luke David Spillman	1011	54.5	
Labour	Judith Margaret Pothecary	449	24.2	
Conservative	Georgette Patricia Polley	392	21.2	
Majority		562	30.3	
Turnout			24.7	
UKIP gain from Independent		Swing		

=== Belhus ===
Belhus 2016
Party	Candidate	Votes	%	±%
UKIP	Angela Sheridan	939	49.6	
Labour	Susan Margaret Gray	648	34.2	
Conservative	John Fredrick Biddall	305	16.2	
Majority		291		
UKIP gain from Labour		Swing		

=== Chadwell St Mary ===
Chadwell St Mary 2016
Party	Candidate	Votes	%	±%
Labour	Gerard William Rice	1017	45.5	11.4
UKIP	Matthew Torri	968	43.3	−0.9
Conservative	Lee Dove	252	11.3	−10.4
Majority		49	2.2	
Turnout		2,237	31.6	−31.
Labour hold		Swing	6.2	

=== Chafford & North Stifford ===
Chafford & North Stifford 2016
Party	Candidate	Votes	%	±%
Conservative	Garry Paul John Hague	672	45.3	
Labour	Umar Kankiya	493	33.2	
UKIP	James Albert Mower	318	21.5	
Majority		179		
Conservative hold		Swing		

=== Corringham & Fobbing ===
Corringham & Fobbing 2016
Party	Candidate	Votes	%	±%
Conservative	Aaron Shaun Watkins	753	47.1	
UKIP	Neil Speight	507	31.7	
Labour	Vincent William Offord	339	21.2	
Majority		246		
Conservative hold		Swing		

=== East Tilbury ===
East Tilbury 2016
Party	Candidate	Votes	%	±%
UKIP	Susan Rose Sammons	736	58.5	
Labour	Eleanor Lowe	271	21.5	
Conservative	Paul Polley	251	20.0	
Majority		465		
UKIP gain from Independent		Swing		

=== Grays Riverside ===
Grays Riverside 2016
Party	Candidate	Votes	%	±%
Labour	Anthony William Fish	857	43.2	
UKIP	Michael John Carbery	748	37.7	
Conservative	Evelina Vulpe	379	19.1	
Majority		109		
Labour hold		Swing		

=== Grays Thurrock ===
Grays Thurrock 2016
Party	Candidate	Votes	%	±%
Labour	John George Kent	1022	46.3	
UKIP	Allen Mayes	809	36.6	
Conservative	Michelle Macadangdang	278	12.6	
Independent	Tom Davis	100	4.5	
Majority		213		
Labour hold		Swing		

=== Little Thurrock Blackshots ===
Little Thurrock Blackshots 2016
Party	Candidate	Votes	%	±%
Conservative	Joy Redsell	706	41.5	▼19.3
UKIP	Jennifer Coleman	705	41.5	▲36.2
Labour	Jacqueline Dobson	287	16.9	▼17.4
Majority		1		
Conservative hold		Swing		

=== Ockendon ===
Ockendon 2016
Party	Candidate	Votes	%	±%
UKIP	David Luke Potter	1038	46.5	
Conservative	Barry William Johnson	634	28.4	
Labour	Desmond Martins	558	25.1	
Majority		404		
UKIP gain from Conservative		Swing		

=== Orsett ===
Orsett 2016
Party	Candidate	Votes	%	±%
Conservative	Susan Ann Little	1057	54.4	
UKIP	Peter Anthony Curtis	634	32.6	
Labour	Carl Anthony Graham Morris	253	13.0	
Majority		423		
Conservative hold		Swing		

=== South Chafford ===
South Chafford 2016
Party	Candidate	Votes	%	±%
Conservative	Suzanne Gwenith Macpherson	587	45.8	
Labour	Qaisar Abbas	510	39.8	
UKIP	Torren Snell	184	14.4	
Majority		77		
Conservative hold		Swing		

=== Stanford East & Corringham Town ===
Stanford East & Corringham Town 2016
Party	Candidate	Votes	%	±%
UKIP	Jack Sean Duffin	1107	49.9	
Labour	Terence Brian Hipsey	611	27.6	
Conservative	Stuart Andrew Smith	499	22.5	
Majority		496		
UKIP gain from Labour		Swing		

=== Stanford-le-Hope West ===
Stanford-le-Hope West 2016
Party	Candidate	Votes	%	±%
Conservative	Terry Louis Piccolo	613	42.8	
UKIP	Lee James Lloyd	427	29.8	
Labour	David Russell Hann	393	27.4	
Majority		186		
Conservative gain from Labour		Swing		

=== The Homesteads ===
The Homesteads 2016
Party	Candidate	Votes	%	±%
Conservative	Gary Alan Collins	908	38.5	
UKIP	Clive Herbert Broad	685	29.1	
Labour	Michael John Alexander Fletcher	469	19.9	
Independent	Gary James Byrne	295	12.5	
Majority		223		
Conservative hold		Swing		

=== Tilbury St Chads ===
Tilbury St Chads 2016
Party	Candidate	Votes	%	±%
UKIP	John Arthur Allen	606	47.9	
Labour	Lynn Worrall	570	45.1	
Conservative	Adam Carter	89	7.0	
Majority		36	2.9	
Turnout			31.7	
UKIP gain from Labour		Swing		

=== West Thurrock & South Stifford ===
West Thurrock & South Stifford 2016
Party	Candidate	Votes	%	±%
Labour	Oliver Gerrish	984	54.9	
UKIP	Jacqueline Ann Stephen	500	27.9	
Conservative	Tony Coughlin	308	17.2	
Majority		484		
Labour hold		Swing		

== Subsequent changes between 2016 and 2018 elections ==
All 17 UKIP councillors left the party in January 2018 to form Thurrock Independents.
