= 2021 Thurrock Council election =

2021 UK local government election

Map showing the results of the 2021 Thurrock Council election

The 2021 Thurrock Council election took place on 6 May 2021 to elect members of Thurrock Council in England. This was on the same day as other local elections. The previous election in the area was in 2019 and the next was in 2022.

The Conservatives won the popular vote by over 50% of total vote share, and took three seats the party had never won previously – Chadwell St Mary, Belhus and East Tilbury.

The overall turnout for the election was 27.34%.

== Result summary ==
2021 Thurrock Council election
Party	This election			Full council			This election		
Party	Seats	Net	Seats %	Other	Total	Total %	Votes	Votes %	+/−
Conservative	13	▲6	76.5	16	29	59.2	15,533	53.2	+21.5
Labour	4	Steady	23.5	12	16	32.7	9,704	33.2	+1.6
Thurrock Ind.	0	▼6	0.0	3	3	6.1	2,435	8.3	-20.7
Independent	0	Steady	0.0	1	1	2.0	1,086	3.7	-0.8
Green	0	Steady	0.0	0	0	0.0	301	1.0	+0.5
Reform UK	0	Steady	0.0	0	0	0.0	140	0.5	New

== Ward results ==
=== Aveley & Uplands ===
Aveley & Uplands
Party	Candidate	Votes	%	±%
Conservative	Maureen Pearce	1,137	66.3	+45.1
Labour	Srikanth Goud Panjala	579	33.7	+9.5
Majority		558	32.6	
Conservative gain from UKIP		Swing		

=== Belhus ===
Belhus
Party	Candidate	Votes	%	±%
Conservative	Georgette Polley	767	44.8	+28.7
Labour	Mohammed Aminul Hoque	577	33.7	−0.5
Thurrock Ind.	Graham Lloyd Hamilton	367	21.4	N/A
Majority				
Conservative gain from UKIP		Swing		

=== Chadwell St. Mary ===
Chadwell St. Mary
Party	Candidate	Votes	%	±%
Conservative	Adam Carter	889	45.4	+34.1
Labour	Carl Anthony Graham Morris	771	39.3	−6.2
Thurrock Ind.	Russell Peter Cherry	300	15.3	N/A
Majority				
Conservative gain from Labour		Swing		

=== Chafford & North Stifford ===
Chafford & North Stifford
Party	Candidate	Votes	%	±%
Conservative	James Thandi	1,031	69.1	+23.8
Labour	Mofeda Parvin Tuhin	460	30.9	+9.5
Majority				
Conservative hold		Swing		

=== Corringham & Fobbing ===
Corringham & Fobbing
Party	Candidate	Votes	%	±%
Conservative	Graham Snell	992	70.3	+23.2
Labour	John Cecil	420	29.7	+8.5
Majority				
Conservative hold		Swing		

=== East Tilbury ===
East Tilbury
Party	Candidate	Votes	%	±%
Conservative	Susan Sammons	639	42.8	−15.7
Independent	Neil Speight	605	40.5	N/A
Labour	Jacqueline Dobson	250	16.7	−4.8
Majority				
Conservative gain from UKIP		Swing		

=== Grays Riverside ===
Grays Riverside
Party	Candidate	Votes	%	±%
Labour	Anthony William Fish	917	51.3	+8.1
Conservative	Adetobi Adewa-Faboro	638	35.7	+16.6
Green	Daniel David Fallows	234	13.1	N/A
Majority		279	12.6	
Labour hold		Swing		

=== Grays Thurrock ===
Grays Thurrock
Party	Candidate	Votes	%	±%
Labour	John George Kent	1,130	57.4	+11.1
Conservative	Sophie Corcoran	838	42.6	+30.0
Majority		292	14.8	
Labour hold		Swing		

=== Little Thurrock Blackshots ===
Little Thurrock Blackshots
Party	Candidate	Votes	%	±%
Conservative	Joycelyn Redsell	879	51.8	+10.2
Thurrock Ind.	Oliver Mark Smith	398	23.5	N/A
Labour	Marc John Francis Sugrue	352	20.8	+3.9
Green	Manmagun Singh	67	4.0	N/A
Majority				
Conservative hold		Swing		

=== Ockendon ===
Ockendon
Party	Candidate	Votes	%	±%
Conservative	Luke Spillman	1,213	55.2	+26.8
Labour	Ruth Clapham	733	33.3	+8.3
Thurrock Ind.	Maurice Kelley	252	11.5	N/A
Majority				
Conservative gain from UKIP		Swing		

=== Orsett ===
Orsett
Party	Candidate	Votes	%	±%
Conservative	Susan Ann Morgan Little	1,465	80.6	+26.2
Labour	Gary Watson	236	13.0	+0.0
Independent	Stephen John Andrews	117	6.4	N/A
Majority				
Conservative hold		Swing		

=== South Chafford ===
South Chafford
Party	Candidate	Votes	%	±%
Conservative	Augustine Ononaji	672	53.0	+7.2
Labour	Clifford John Holloway	597	47.0	+7.2
Majority		75	6.0	
Conservative hold		Swing		

=== Stanford East & Corringham Town ===
Stanford East & Corringham Town
Party	Candidate	Votes	%	±%
Conservative	Jack Duffin	1,153	61.2	+11.3
Labour	Valerie Morris-Cook	412	21.9	−5.7
Thurrock Ind.	Olugbenga Olajugbagbe	318	16.9	N/A
Majority				
Conservative gain from UKIP		Swing		

=== Stanford-le-Hope West ===
Stanford-le-Hope West
Party	Candidate	Votes	%	±%
Conservative	Terry Piccolo	784	50.4	+7.6
Thurrock Ind.	Ross James Byrne	371	23.9	N/A
Labour	Leslie James Strange	342	22.0	−5.4
Reform UK	Dean Peter Braun	58	3.7	N/A
Majority				
Conservative hold		Swing		

=== The Homesteads ===
The Homesteads
Party	Candidate	Votes	%	±%
Conservative	Gary Collins	1,426	59.9	+21.4
Labour	Mark Wayne Hurrell	445	18.7	−1.2
Thurrock Ind.	John Robert Fox	429	18.0	N/A
Reform UK	William George Poskitt	82	3.4	N/A
Majority				
Conservative hold		Swing		

=== Tilbury St. Chads ===
Tilbury St. Chads
Party	Candidate	Votes	%	±%
Labour	Kairen Raper	479	46.2	+1.1
Independent	John Arthur Allen	364	35.1	−12.8
Conservative	Joseph Kaley	193	18.6	+11.6
Majority				
Labour gain from UKIP		Swing		

=== West Thurrock & South Stifford ===
West Thurrock & South Stifford
Party	Candidate	Votes	%	±%
Labour	Lee Watson	1,004	55.1	+0.2
Conservative	Brian Seeger	817	44.9	+27.7
Majority		187	10.2	
Labour hold		Swing		
