= 2022 Thurrock Council election =

British local election

| ← 2021 | 5 May 2022 | 2023 → |

16 of the 49 seats to Thurrock Council 25 seats needed for a majority
- Turnout: 26.41% (▼0.93%)
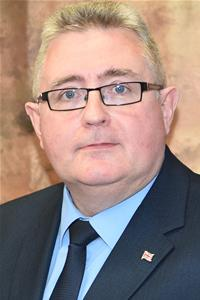

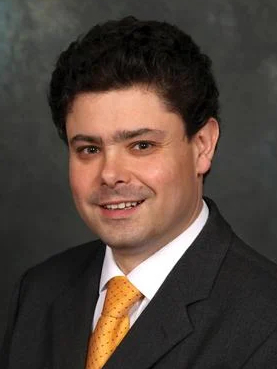

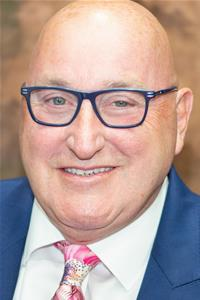
| | First party | Second party | Third party |
|---|---|---|---|
| Leader | Rob Gledhill | John Kent (Note: John Kent is the leader of the Labour Group on the council but his seat was not contested.) | Gary Byrne (Note: Gary Byrne is the leader of the Thurrock Independent Group on the council but his seat was not contested. His son Ross Byrne contested a seat in the Stanford East & Corringham Town ward.) |
| Party | Conservative | Labour | Thurrock Ind. |
| Leader's seat | Little Thurrock Rectory | Grays Thurrock | Ockendon |
| Seats before | 30 | 15 | 3 |
| Seats won | 9 | 6 | 0 |
| Seats after | 30 | 14 | 3 |
| Seat change | 0 | ▼1 | 0 |
| Percentage | 48% | 48% | 2% |
| Swing | ▼11 pp | ▲16 pp | ▼4 pp |
| | Fourth party |
| | Ind |
| Leader | None |
| Party | Independent |
| Seats before | 1 |
| Seats won | 1 |
| Seats after | 2 |
| Seat change | ▲1 |
| Percentage | 2% |
| Swing | ▼1 pp |
- Map of the election results with each ward representing a seat. Uncontested wards/seats are shown in white
Council control before election
Conservative
Council control after election
Conservative

The 2022 Thurrock Council election took place on 5 May 2022 to elect a third of the members of Thurrock Council in England. Sixteen of the council's 49 seats were contested in sixteen of Thurrock's twenty electoral wards. There are two or three seats in each ward depending on its population. This was on the same day as other local elections across the United Kingdom.

The Conservatives won the popular vote by 91 votes and retained their thirty-seat majority in the council while Labour came out with fourteen seats, the lowest amount they have ever held on the council. The average turnout for the election was 26.41% per ward, meaning that one in four of all of Thurrock's eligible voters had participated.

== Election background ==
In the run-up to the election, both the Conservatives and Labour ran on local manifestos focusing on financial prosperity. The Conservatives, who administered the council, promised continued local investment and aid to combat the cost of living crisis, while Labour, the council's main opposition, criticised the Conservatives for high council tax, overborrowing, overspending and an alleged lack of transparency, promising to instead focus on openness and the community. There were also accusations by the Conservative council leader Rob Gledhill that Labour's councillors had supported the Just Stop Oil protests in the borough, adding that the Labour Group on the council had "close links" to the organisation.

The Conservatives won and lost two seats, retaining their thirty-seat majority in the council. One Conservative to lose his seat was councillor David Van Day, who lost to Labour's Srikanth Panjala by twenty votes. Labour won two seats in total but lost another three, resulting in a fourteen-seat minority; the lowest amount of seats Labour has ever held on the council. The Thurrock Independents stood its leader's son Ross Byrne in the ward of Stanford East & Corringham Town, although their own seats were uncontested. A non-aligned independent councillor was elected in the Tilbury Riverside & Thurrock Park ward, leaving a total of two independent councillors in the council.

Mayor Sue Shinnick vacated her Labour seat in Ockendon to stand in the Conservative-held South Chafford ward. Although she won, her old seat fell to Conservative councillor Paul Arnold. Labour's loss was attributed to changing demographics in the South Ockendon area. Meanwhile, Conservative council leader Rob Gledhill retained his seat with a small majority of 157, mirroring his near-defeat to UKIP in the 2014 council elections.

The Conservatives won the popular vote with 12,442 votes, a small majority of 91 against Labour's 12,351. The election suffered a low turnout, with only one in four eligible voters participating.

== Ward results ==
Below are the results for all sixteen contested seats in their respective wards. Winning candidates are shown in bold.

=== Aveley & Uplands ===
Aveley & Uplands
| Party | Candidate | Votes | % | ±% |
|---|---|---|---|---|
| **Labour** | **Srikanth Panjala** | **877** | **50.6** | **+16.9** |
| Conservative | David Van Day | 857 | 49.4 | −16.9 |
| Majority | | 20 | | |
| Turnout | | 1,750 | 23.28 | |
| Labour **gain** from Thurrock Ind. | | Swing | | |

=== Belhus ===
Belhus
| Party | Candidate | Votes | % | ±% |
|---|---|---|---|---|
| **Conservative** | **George Coxshall** | **864** | **51.2** | **+6.4** |
| Labour | Mark Hurrell | 822 | 48.8 | +15.1 |
| Majority | | 42 | | |
| Turnout | | 1,706 | 23.76 | |
| Conservative **gain** from Labour | | Swing | | |

=== Chadwell St. Mary ===
Chadwell St. Mary
| Party | Candidate | Votes | % | ±% |
|---|---|---|---|---|
| **Labour** | **Sara Muldowney** | **1,144** | **59.8** | **+20.5** |
| Conservative | Gavin Holland | 770 | 40.2 | −5.2 |
| Majority | | 374 | | |
| Turnout | | 1,929 | 26.72 | |
| Labour **hold** | | Swing | | |

=== Grays Riverside ===
Grays Riverside
| Party | Candidate | Votes | % | ±% |
|---|---|---|---|---|
| **Labour** | **Martin Kerin** | **1,208** | **71.9** | **+20.6** |
| Conservative | Obinna Obi-Njoku | 472 | 28.1 | −7.6 |
| Majority | | 736 | | |
| Turnout | | 1,703 | 21.09 | |
| Labour **hold** | | Swing | | |

=== Grays Thurrock ===
Grays Thurrock
| Party | Candidate | Votes | % | ±% |
|---|---|---|---|---|
| **Labour** | **Lynn Worrall** | **1,153** | **68.1** | **+10.7** |
| Conservative | Joanne Swash | 540 | 31.9 | −10.7 |
| Majority | | 613 | | |
| Turnout | | 1,710 | 25.97 | |
| Labour **hold** | | Swing | | |

=== Little Thurrock Blackshots ===
Little Thurrock Blackshots
| Party | Candidate | Votes | % | ±% |
|---|---|---|---|---|
| **Conservative** | **Benjamin Maney** | **906** | **61.3** | **+9.5** |
| Labour | Clifford Holloway | 571 | 38.7 | +17.9 |
| Majority | | 335 | | |
| Turnout | | 1,488 | 29.07 | |
| Conservative **hold** | | Swing | | |

=== Little Thurrock Rectory ===
Little Thurrock Rectory
| Party | Candidate | Votes | % | ±% |
|---|---|---|---|---|
| **Conservative** | **Rob Gledhill** | **765** | **55.7** | **+15.3** |
| Labour | Aaron Green | 608 | 44.3 | +24.4 |
| Majority | | 157 | | |
| Turnout | | 1,388 | 30.53 | |
| Conservative **hold** | | Swing | | |

- Change shown from 2019, when this ward was last up for election

=== Ockendon ===
Ockendon
| Party | Candidate | Votes | % | ±% |
|---|---|---|---|---|
| **Conservative** | **Paul Arnold** | **1,021** | **53.8** | **−1.4** |
| Labour | Ruth Clapham | 877 | 46.2 | +12.9 |
| Majority | | 144 | | |
| Turnout | | 1,923 | 23.35 | |
| Conservative **gain** from Labour | | Swing | | |

=== Orsett ===
Orsett
| Party | Candidate | Votes | % | ±% |
|---|---|---|---|---|
| **Conservative** | **Barry Johnson** | **1,095** | **72.8** | **−7.8** |
| Labour | Gary Watson | 410 | 27.2 | +14.2 |
| Majority | | 685 | | |
| Turnout | | 1,532 | 30.38 | |
| Conservative **hold** | | Swing | | |

=== South Chafford ===
South Chafford
| Party | Candidate | Votes | % | ±% |
|---|---|---|---|---|
| **Labour** | **Sue Shinnick** | **697** | **55.2** | **+8.2** |
| Conservative | Abosede Akinbohun | 566 | 44.8 | −8.2 |
| Majority | | 131 | | |
| Turnout | | 1,272 | 25.41 | |
| Labour **hold** | | Swing | | |

=== Stanford East & Corringham Town ===
Stanford East & Corringham Town
| Party | Candidate | Votes | % | ±% |
|---|---|---|---|---|
| **Conservative** | **Alex Anderson** | **824** | **46.4** | **−14.8** |
| Labour Co-op | John Cecil | 524 | 29.5 | +7.6 |
| Thurrock Ind. | Ross Byrne | 427 | 24.1 | +7.2 |
| Majority | | 300 | | |
| Turnout | | 1,786 | 28.17 | |
| Conservative **hold** | | Swing | | |

=== Stifford Clays ===
Stifford Clays
| Party | Candidate | Votes | % | ±% |
|---|---|---|---|---|
| **Conservative** | **Elizabeth Rigby** | **749** | **53.0** | **+22.4** |
| Labour | Mark Hooper | 665 | 47.0 | +16.0 |
| Majority | | 84 | | |
| Turnout | | 1,434 | 28.71 | |
| Conservative **hold** | | Swing | | |

- Change shown from 2019, when this ward was last up for election

=== The Homesteads ===
The Homesteads
| Party | Candidate | Votes | % | ±% |
|---|---|---|---|---|
| **Conservative** | **James Halden** | **1,363** | **65.9** | **+6.0** |
| Labour | Jacqueline Dobson | 704 | 34.1 | +15.4 |
| Majority | | 659 | | |
| Turnout | | 2,117 | 33.23 | |
| Conservative **hold** | | Swing | | |

=== Tilbury Riverside & Thurrock Park ===
Tilbury Riverside & Thurrock Park
| Party | Candidate | Votes | % | ±% |
|---|---|---|---|---|
| **Independent** | **John Allen** | **562** | **43.5** | **N/A** |
| Labour | Bukky Okunade | 439 | 34.0 | −0.5 |
| Conservative | Judan Ali | 290 | 22.5 | +14.2 |
| Majority | | 123 | | |
| Turnout | | 1,292 | 27.35 | |
| Independent **gain** from Labour | | Swing | | |

- Change shown from 2019, when this ward was last up for election

=== Tilbury St. Chads ===
Tilbury St. Chads
| Party | Candidate | Votes | % | ±% |
|---|---|---|---|---|
| **Labour** | **Stephen Liddiard** | **670** | **75.2** | **+29.0** |
| Conservative | David Morgan | 221 | 24.8 | +6.2 |
| Majority | | 449 | | |
| Turnout | | 901 | 20.91 | |
| Labour **hold** | | Swing | | |

=== West Thurrock & South Stifford ===
West Thurrock & South Stifford
| Party | Candidate | Votes | % | ±% |
|---|---|---|---|---|
| **Conservative** | **Qaisar Abbas** | **1,139** | **53.7** | **+8.8** |
| Labour | David Harris | 982 | 46.3 | −8.8 |
| Majority | | 157 | | |
| Turnout | | 2,141 | 24.65 | |
| Conservative **gain** from Labour | | Swing | | |
