= 2014 Thurrock Council election =

2014 UK local government election

Thurrock Council election, 2014
- 22 May 2014

16 of the 49 seats to Thurrock Council 25 seats needed for a majority
	First party	Second party	Third party
Party	Labour	Conservative	UKIP
Seats won	6	5	5
Seats after	23	18	6
Seat change	▼2	▼3	▲5
Popular vote	9,730	9,157	12,763
Percentage	29.7%	28.2%	39.0%
Swing	▼9.3%	▼1.7%	▲21.0%
	Fourth party
Party	Independent
Seats won	0
Seats after	2
Seat change	Steady
- Results of the 2014 Thurrock Council election
Council control before election
Labour
Council control after election
No overall control

Elections to Thurrock Council were held on 22 May 2014. The UK Independence Party gained five seats, three from the Conservatives and two from Labour. Of the sixteen wards contested, Labour won six, the UKIP five and the Conservatives five. The council went from Labour-controlled to no overall control.

== Result ==
Thurrock Council election result, 2014
Party	Seats	Gains	Losses	Net gain/loss	Seats %	Votes %	Votes	+/−
Labour	23	0	2	-2	46.9	29.7	9,730	
Conservative	18	0	3	-3	36.7	28	9,157	
UKIP	6	5	0	+5	12.2	39	12,763	
Liberal Democrats	0	0	0	0	0	2.5	817	
Independent	2	0	0	0	4	-	-	
National Front	0	0	0	0	0	0.3	110	

== See also ==
- Politics of the United Kingdom
