= 2024 Thurrock Council election =

English local election

← 2023	2 May 2024	2026 →

17 out of 49 seats to Thurrock Council 25 seats needed for a majority
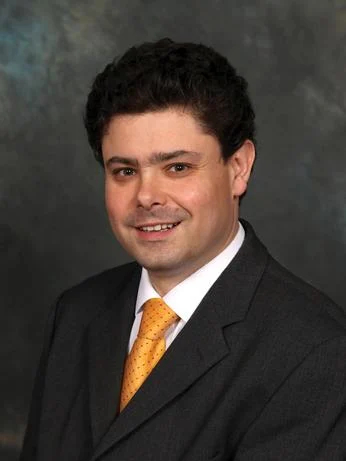

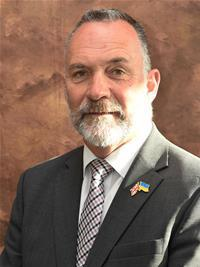

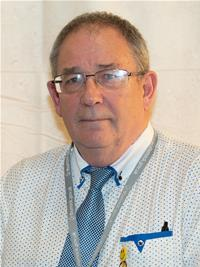
	First party	Second party	Third party
Leader	John Kent	Andrew Jefferies	Neil Speight (Note: Leader and spokesman of the Non-Political Alliance of Independent Councillors, which represented the majority of independent councillors at the time of the election.)
Party	Labour	Conservative	Independent
Leader's seat	Grays Thurrock	Ockendon	Stanford-le-Hope West
Last election	19 seats, 45.1%	26 seats, 32.4%	3 seats, 10.0%
Seats before	19	23	7 (Note: Including five members of the Non-Political Alliance of Independent Councillors and two unaffiliated independents.)
Seats after	27	13	9 (Note: Including five members of the Non-Political Alliance of Independent Councillors and four unaffiliated independents.)
Seat change	▲8	▼10	▲2
Popular vote	14,767	8,327	4,457
Percentage	52.1%	29.4%	15.7%
Swing	▲7 pp	▼3 pp	▲5.7 pp
- Results by ward and party colour. Wards which were not contested at this election are coloured white.
Leader before election
Andrew Jefferies
Conservative
No overall control
Leader after election
John Kent
Labour

The 2024 Thurrock Council election was held on 2 May 2024 to elect a third of the members of Thurrock Council in Essex, England. It was held on the same day as other local elections across England, including the 2024 Essex police and crime commissioner election. The Labour Party led by John Kent won control of the council for the first time since 2014 from the Conservative Party, which had previously governed in a minority administration with no overall control.

== Background ==
At the previous council election in May 2023, the Labour opposition led by John Kent made gains against the incumbent Conservative administration led by Mark Coxshall. Labour gained five seats, increasing its total share of seats in the council to 19. The Conservatives, now having 26 seats, retained control of the council but saw their majority reduced to three. The Thurrock Independents lost two seats but held one, leaving them with a single councillor. The election also returned three independents not affiliated to any party. Coxshall lost his seat in the election, and later in the month the council elected Conservative Andrew Jefferies as the new leader of the council. The election followed the council's declaration of effective bankruptcy in September 2022, which left it in £1.5 billion of debt.

In July 2023, Conservative councillor Sue Sammons left her party to become an independent in protest of its decision to cut local bus services. This action left the Conservatives with a majority of two on the council. In the same month, the Thurrock Independents de-registered as a political party. The make-up of the council now consisted of five seats being held by independents, 19 held by Labour and 25 held by the Conservatives. The independents in the council later organised themselves into a single group, the Non-Political Alliance of Independent Councillors (NPAIC), with councillor Neil Speight as their leader and spokesman. NPAIC candidates would run in the 2024 election as independents.

In February 2024, it was revealed that the Conservative administration was considering an increase in council tax of 7.99% from April to present a balanced budget for 2024–2025. Council tax had already been increased by 10% the previous year as a condition for additional financial support from the government to help reduce the council's £636 million deficit. The administration also planned to make savings of £18.2 million over the next two years. It had already introduced several measures to cut spending, which included a 7.7% increase in rent for council housing and an introduction of charges for school transport among other measures.

The Conservative administration put forward its economic proposals in its budget for 2024–2025, which was voted on by councillors in March 2024. Conservative councillors were whipped to vote in favour of the budget. Labour abstained from the vote, allowing the budget to pass. Two Conservative councillors, Jack Duffin and Alex Anderson, rebelled against the party leadership and voted against the budget with three NPAIC councillors. Duffin and Anderson were subsequently suspended from the Conservative group as a disciplinary measure and became independents, resulting in the Conservatives losing their majority and the council falling under no overall control. Duffin and Anderson did not join the NPAIC and instead chose to sit alone as unaffiliated independents. Following their suspension, the Conservatives continued to run the council in a minority administration.

== Electoral system ==
The election was held on 2 May 2024, the same day as other local elections across England. All local elections were held under the first-past-the-post voting system. Electors in Thurrock had one vote for a candidate in their ward, with the candidate winning the most votes securing the seat. Electors in Thurrock could also vote in the 2024 Essex police and crime commissioner election which was held on the same day.

Under Thurrock Council's then-electoral system, elections to the council were held annually every three in four years, with a third of its 49 councillors elected to represent one of its 20 wards for a term of four years at each election. As such, three wards were not contested in 2024, including Stifford Clays, Little Thurrock Rectory, and Tilbury Riverside and Thurrock Park. This was the last election held under this system, as all 49 seats are to be contested in elections every four years from May 2025 onwards. This reform was implemented by the government as part of its ongoing intervention in the council following its effective bankruptcy in 2022.

== Campaign ==
The Labour Party and the Conservative Party stood in every ward at the election. Ahead of the election, it was expected that the low national polling numbers of the Conservatives, as well as the financial difficulties faced by the council during the Conservative administration, would influence its outcome, with local election experts Colin Rallings and Michael Thrasher suggesting that Labour could regain its traditional control of the council. During the election campaign, Conservative leader Andrew Jefferies acknowledged that the election would be "tough" for his party, but also claimed that Labour had no plan for the borough. He pledged that the Conservatives would not close libraries or cut children's and lollipopping services and voiced his party's interest in potential business opportunities such as the Thames Freeport if it remained in power after the election. National Conservative leader and prime minister Rishi Sunak visited Corringham as part of his national campaign to secure votes for his party in the local elections. Sunak refused to say if he would resign if the Conservatives lost power in Thurrock and other local councils in Essex. The national Labour Party identified Thurrock as one of its main targets out of the local elections taking place across the country, with Labour's deputy national campaign co-ordinator Ellie Reeves stating that it was one of the areas the party needed to make gains in to win the 2024 United Kingdom general election. Local Labour leader John Kent warned that Labour would have to "take tough decisions" and could not "promise the earth" amid the financial burden faced by the council, which he blamed on the Conservatives, but promised to cooperate with local communities while protecting services for the elderly and the young and maintaining basic services if his party won power.

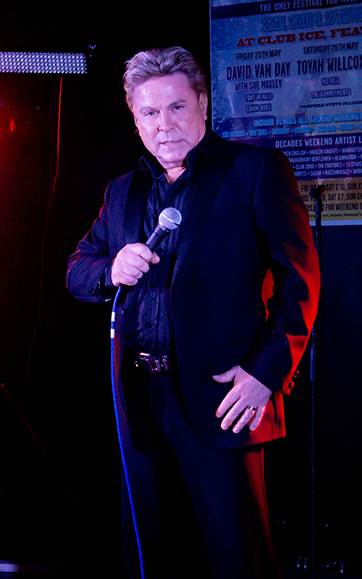
Former Conservative councillor David Van Day stood for election in the Orsett ward against former Labour councillor Carl Morris and independent candidate Jack Duffin

The strengthened local presence of independent candidates and the Green Party led by Eugene McCarthy, standing in seven and four wards respectively, was also expected to pose a potential challenge to the Conservatives. According to McCarthy, the Greens would focus on building new council homes, investing in high streets and delivering "common-sense" finances. The independents stood in the east of the borough and in North Stifford and Chafford Hundred; according to independent councillor Fraser Massey this council election had the most independent candidates in Thurrock's recent history. The ward of Orsett, traditionally a safe seat for the Conservatives, also attracted attention during the campaign for its three-way contest between former Conservative councillor David Van Day, former Labour mayor and councillor Carl Morris and independent councillor Jack Duffin, who was expelled from the Conservative Party earlier in the year and secured the support of prominent local Conservative activist Brian Little.

=== Opinion polls ===
Dates conducted	Pollster	Client	Area	Con	Lab	Lib Dems	Green	Reform	Ind & others	Lead
14–29 April 2024	YouGov	N/A	Thurrock	36.4%	52.4%	0% (Note: The Liberal Democrats did not stand in this election.)	1.8%	0% (Note: Reform UK did not stand in this election.)	9.4%	16

Pollster YouGov identified Thurrock Council as one of sixteen key battleground local authorities in the 2024 local elections, possibly indicative of results in the rest of England and Wales, and therefore used multi-level regression and post-stratification (MRP) polling to gauge voting intention in the borough ahead of the election. A poll conducted from 14 April to 29 April and published on 30 April projected significant gains for the Labour Party in the borough, with the overall outcome of the election considered too close to call to predict which party would win control of the council.

== Results summary ==
2024 Thurrock Council election
Party	This election			Full council			This election		
Party	Seats	Net	Seats %	Other	Total	Total %	Votes	Votes %	+/−
Labour	12	▲8	70.6	15	27	55.1	14,829	51.4	+6.3
Conservative	1	▼10	5.9	12	13	26.5	8,328	28.9	-3.5
Independent	4	▲2	23.5	5	9	18.4	4,457	15.5	+5.5
Green	0	Steady	0.0	0	0	0.0	810	2.8	+2.6

Following the election, Labour held 27 of the council's 49 seats, giving them an overall majority on the council for the first time since 2014. Their group leader, John Kent, was formally appointed as the new leader of the council at the subsequent annual council meeting on 22 May 2024. The NPAIC invited the newly elected independent councillors to join their group, with the majority expected to do so; by July 2024, eight of the nine independent councillors were members of the NPAIC. In September 2024, the unaffiliated independent Alex Anderson joined Reform UK, becoming Thurrock's first councillor from that party. In October 2024, councillor John Allen left the NPAIC to sit as an unaffiliated independent, as he was considering standing for Reform UK in the 2025 council election, leaving the NPAIC with seven independents.

== Results by ward ==
The Statement of Persons Nominated, which detailed the candidates who stood in each ward, was released by Thurrock Council following the close of nominations on 5 April 2023. One candidate was elected per ward. The results were announced in the early hours of 3 May after votes were counted, with different wards having their results declared from 1:35 AM until the confirmation of the final results at 02:49 AM.

=== Aveley & Uplands ===
Aveley & Uplands
Party	Candidate	Votes	%	±%
Labour	Cathy Sisterson	1,235	63.1	+15.8
Conservative	Augustine Chidi Ononaji	721	36.9	–15.8
Majority		514	26.2	
Turnout		1,956	26	
Registered electors		7,523		
Labour gain from Conservative		Swing		

=== Belhus ===
Belhus
Party	Candidate	Votes	%	±%
Labour	Victoria Claire Holloway	1,072	68.9	+20.4
Conservative	Georgette Polley	483	31.1	+3.6
Majority		589		
Turnout			21.79	
Registered electors				
Labour gain from Conservative		Swing		

=== Chadwell St. Mary ===
Chadwell St. Mary
Party	Candidate	Votes	%	±%
Labour	Ngozi Alike	1,131	72.0	−1.1
Conservative	Charlie Taylor-Webb	439	28.0	+1.1
Majority		695		
Turnout		1,570	22	
Registered electors				
Labour gain from Conservative		Swing		

=== Chafford & North Stifford ===
Chafford & North Stifford
Party	Candidate	Votes	%	±%
Labour	Lynda Hilary Heath	853	48.5	−0.6
Conservative	Adam Carter	603	34.3	−8.0
Independent	Bisi Sowunmi	300	17.1	N/A
Majority		250		
Turnout		1,756	31.2	
Registered electors				
Labour gain from Conservative		Swing		

=== Corringham & Fobbing ===
Corringham & Fobbing
Party	Candidate	Votes	%	±%
Independent	John Robert Fox	684	46.7	+8.4
Conservative	Shane Ralph	426	29.1	−9.9
Labour	James Patrick Mackinlay	354	24.2	+1.4
Majority		258		
Turnout		1,464	33.3	
Registered electors				
Independent gain from Conservative		Swing		

=== East Tilbury ===
East Tilbury
Party	Candidate	Votes	%	±%
Independent	Sue Sammons	725	57.3	−17.6
Labour	Alastair Michael Craft	444	35.1	+16.4
Conservative	Shamim Miah	96	7.5	+1.2
Majority		281		
Turnout		1,265	24	
Registered electors				
Independent gain from Conservative		Swing		

=== Grays Riverside ===
Grays Riverside
Party	Candidate	Votes	%	±%
Labour	Tony Fish	1,116	63.4	−12.1
Conservative	Bunmi Ojetola	359	20.4	−4.1
Green	Daniel David Fallows	286	16.2	N/A
Majority		757		
Turnout		1,761	21.8	
Registered electors				
Labour hold		Swing		

=== Grays Thurrock ===
Grays Thurrock
Party	Candidate	Votes	%	±%
Labour	John George Kent	1,428	77.8	+9.2
Conservative	Joglur Rahman	408	22.2	+1.7
Majority		1,020		
Turnout		1,836	28	
Registered electors				
Labour hold		Swing		

=== Little Thurrock Blackshots ===
Little Thurrock Blackshots
Party	Candidate	Votes	%	±%
Labour	Michael John Fletcher	720	48.3	+9.6
Conservative	Joy Redsell	614	41.2	−20.1
Green	Magun Singh	157	10.5	N/A
Majority		106		
Turnout		1,491	29.4	
Registered electors				
Labour gain from Conservative		Swing		

=== Ockendon ===
Ockendon
Party	Candidate	Votes	%	±%
Labour	Ryan James Polston	1,271	53.1	+13.2
Conservative	Luke Spillman	1,123	46.9	−1.4
Majority		148		
Turnout		2,394	29	
Registered electors				
Labour gain from Conservative		Swing		

=== Orsett ===
Orsett
Party	Candidate	Votes	%	±%
Conservative	David Day	657	39.8	−33.0
Independent	Jack Sean Duffin	570	34.5	N/A
Labour	Carl Anthony Graham Morris	424	25.7	−1.5
Majority		87		
Turnout		1,651	32.9	
Registered electors				
Conservative hold		Swing		

=== South Chafford ===
South Chafford
Party	Candidate	Votes	%	±%
Labour	Gary Watson	763	56.4	+1.2
Conservative	Tunde Ojetola	433	32.0	−12.8
Green	Caitlin Elizabeth Fallows	156	11.5	N/A
Majority		330		
Turnout		1,352	26.5	
Registered electors				
Labour gain from Conservative		Swing		

=== Stanford East & Corringham Town ===
Stanford East & Corringham Town
Party	Candidate	Votes	%	±%
Independent	Roy Robert Jones	809	41.3	+10.1
Labour	Ajay Kapoor	768	39.2	+2.0
Conservative	George Joseph Wright	383	19.5	−12.2
Majority		41		
Turnout		1,960	31	
Registered electors				
Independent hold		Swing		

=== Stanford-le-Hope West ===
Stanford-le-Hope West
Party	Candidate	Votes	%	±%
Independent	Ross James Byrne	656	43.6	+5.5
Labour	Philip George Smith	544	36.1	+4.5
Conservative	Terry Picollo	306	20.3	−10.0
Majority		112		
Turnout		1,506	27	
Registered electors				
Independent gain from Conservative		Swing		

=== The Homesteads ===
The Homesteads
Party	Candidate	Votes	%	±%
Labour	Clifford John Holloway	731	35.9	+11.3
Independent	Lisa Jane Sargent	713	35.1	N/A
Conservative	Allen Mayes	590	29.0	+1.8
Majority		18		
Turnout		2,034	32.2	
Registered electors				
Labour gain from Conservative		Swing		

=== Tilbury St. Chads ===
Tilbury St. Chads
Party	Candidate	Votes	%	±%
Labour	Kairen Raper	641	80.0	+4.8
Conservative	Daryl Palmer	160	20.0	−4.8
Majority		481		
Turnout		801	18.73	
Registered electors				
Labour hold		Swing		

=== West Thurrock & South Stifford ===
West Thurrock & South Stifford
Party	Candidate	Votes	%	±%
Labour	Lee Watson	1,272	63.3	+4.4
Conservative	Elisabeta Ionica Gherga Blaj	526	26.2	–14.9
Green	Ri Goodyear	211	10.5	N/A
Majority		746		
Turnout			22.2	
Registered electors				
Labour hold		Swing		

== By-elections ==
=== Ockendon ===
Ockendon by-election: 1 May 2025 (2 seats)
Party	Candidate	Votes	%	±%
Reform UK	Alan Benson	1,214	53.5	N/A
Reform UK	Russell Cherry	1,138	50.1	N/A
Conservative	Sue Johnson	533	23.5	–23.4
Labour	Shalini Bhatt	478	21.1	–32.0
Conservative	Graham Snell	439	19.3	–27.6
Labour	Haruna Hamza	438	19.3	–33.8
Green	Ri Goodyear	93	4.1	N/A
Green	Daniel Fallows	86	3.8	N/A
Liberal Democrats	Brad Hayman	74	3.3	N/A
Independent	Kameel Mohammed	47	2.1	N/A
Turnout		2,368	28.0	–1.0
Reform UK gain from Conservative				
Reform UK gain from Labour				
