= 2023 Thurrock Council election =

2023 English local election

← 2022	4 May 2023	2024 →

16 out of 49 seats to Thurrock Council 25 seats needed for a majority
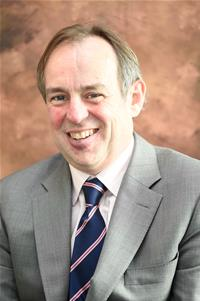

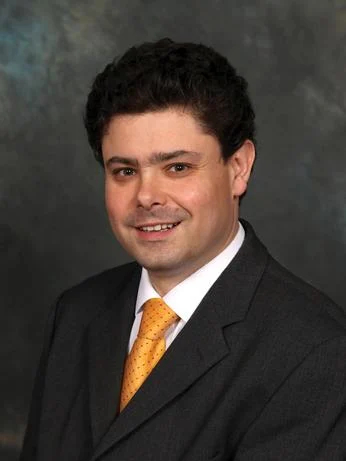

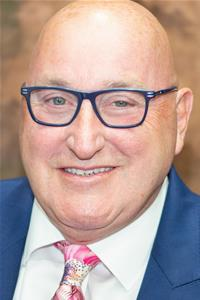
	First party	Second party
Leader	Mark Coxshall	John Kent
Party	Conservative	Labour
Leader's seat	Chafford & North Stifford (lost re-election)	Grays Thurrock
Last election	30 seats, 48.3%	14 seats, 47.9%
Seats before	29	14
Seats won	4	9
Seats after	26	19
Seat change	▼2	▲5
Popular vote	8,490	11,833
Percentage	32.4%	45.1%
Swing	▼15.7%	▼3.0%
	Third party	Fourth party
Leader	N/A	Gary Byrne
Party	Independent	Thurrock Ind.
Leader's seat	N/A	The Homesteads
Last election	1 seat, 2.2%	3 seats, 1.7%
Seats before	3	3
Seats won	2	1
Seats after	3	1
Seat change	▲1	▼4
Popular vote	2,633	2,706
Percentage	10.0%	10.3%
Swing	▲7.8%	▲8.6%
- Winner of each seat at the 2023 Thurrock Council election
Leader before election
Mark Coxshall
Conservative
Leader after election
Andrew Jefferies
Conservative

The 2023 Thurrock Council election took place on 4 May 2023 to elect a third of the members of Thurrock Council in Essex, England. This was on the same day as other local elections across England.

The Conservatives narrowly retained their majority on the council at the election, but lost three seats compared to the position immediately before the election. The election was held in the context of the council having declared effective bankruptcy with debts of about £1.5 billion and a government-appointed commissioner having been installed to oversee the council's financial management. The Conservative leader of the council, Mark Coxshall, and the cabinet member for finance, Shane Hebb, were two of the three who lost their seats. At the subsequent annual council meeting on 24 May 2023, Andrew Jefferies was appointed the new leader.

== Summary ==
=== Election result ===
2023 Thurrock Council election
Party	This election			Full council			This election		
Party	Seats	Net	Seats %	Other	Total	Total %	Votes	Votes %	+/−
Conservative	4	▼2	25.0	22	26	53.1	8,490	32.4	–15.7
Labour	9	▲5	56.3	10	19	38.8	11,833	45.1	–3.0
Independent	2	▲1	12.5	1	3	6.1	2,633	10.0	+7.8
Thurrock Ind.	1	▼4	6.3	0	1	2.0	2,706	10.3	+8.6
Reform UK	0	Steady	0.0	0	0	0.0	436	1.7	N/A
UKIP	0	Steady	0.0	0	0	0.0	79	0.3	N/A
Green	0	Steady	0.0	0	0	0.0	64	0.2	N/A

== Ward results ==
The Statement of Persons Nominated, which details the candidates standing in each ward, was released by Thurrock Council following the close of nomination on 5 April 2023.

Seat changes are relative to the 2019 election and do not take into account any interim by-elections or defections. Vote share changes are relative to the last time the seat was up for election.

=== Aveley & Uplands ===
Aveley & Uplands
Party	Candidate	Votes	%	±%
Conservative	Jacqui Maney	928	52.7	+3.3
Labour	Cathy Sisterson	834	47.3	–3.3
Majority		96	5.4	N/A
Turnout		1,777	23.6	+0.3
Registered electors		7,519		
Conservative hold		Swing	▲3.3	

=== Belhus ===
Belhus
Party	Candidate	Votes	%	±%
Labour	Mark Hurrell	765	48.5	–0.3
Conservative	Abbie Akinbohun	433	27.5	–23.7
Thurrock Ind.	Chris Baker*	299	19.0	N/A
UKIP	Michael Keal	79	5.0	N/A
Majority		332	21.0	N/A
Turnout		1,579	21.9	–1.9
Registered electors		7,210		
Labour gain from Thurrock Ind.		Swing	▲11.7	

=== Chadwell St. Mary ===
Chadwell St. Mary
Party	Candidate	Votes	%	±%
Labour	Daniel Chukwu*	1,256	73.1	+13.3
Conservative	Sophie Corcoran	462	26.9	–13.3
Majority		794	46.2	+26.6
Turnout		1,741	23.8	–2.9
Registered electors		7,317		
Labour hold		Swing	▲13.3	

=== Chafford & North Stifford ===
Chafford & North Stifford
Party	Candidate	Votes	%	±%
Labour	Vikki Hartstean	741	49.1	+18.2
Conservative	Mark Coxshall*	639	42.3	–26.8
Reform UK	Sue Truman	129	8.5	N/A
Majority		102	6.8	N/A
Turnout		1,514	27.1	
Registered electors		5,581		
Labour gain from Conservative		Swing	▲22.5	

=== Corringham & Fobbing ===
Corringham & Fobbing
Party	Candidate	Votes	%	±%
Conservative	Deborah Arnold	555	39.0	–31.3
Thurrock Ind.	John Fox	545	38.3	N/A
Labour	Ngozi Alike	324	22.8	–6.9
Majority		10	0.7	–39.9
Turnout		1,427	32.5	
Registered electors		4,391		
Conservative hold		Swing	N/A	

=== East Tilbury ===
East Tilbury
Party	Candidate	Votes	%	±%
Independent	Fraser Massey*	980	74.9	N/A
Labour	Alastair Craft	245	18.7	+2.0
Conservative	Daryl Palmer	83	6.3	–36.5
Majority		735	56.2	N/A
Turnout		1,317	25.2	
Registered electors		5,222		
Independent hold		Swing	N/A	

=== Grays Riverside ===
Grays Riverside
Party	Candidate	Votes	%	±%
Labour	Valerie Morris-Cook	1,191	75.5	+3.6
Conservative	Emily Folorunsho	386	24.5	–3.6
Majority		805	51.0	+7.2
Turnout		1,590	19.4	–6.6
Registered electors		8,206		
Labour hold		Swing	▲3.6	

=== Grays Thurrock ===
Grays Thurrock
Party	Candidate	Votes	%	±%
Labour	Catherine Kent*	1,151	68.6	+0.5
Conservative	Elizabeth Alo	343	20.5	–11.4
Reform UK	Roy Grayson	183	10.9	N/A
Majority		808	48.1	+11.9
Turnout		1,691	25.5	–0.5
Registered electors		6,644		
Labour hold		Swing	▲6.0	

=== Little Thurrock Rectory ===
Little Thurrock Rectory
Party	Candidate	Votes	%	±%
Conservative	Tom Kelly*	580	39.7	–16.0
Labour	Enayet Sarwar	550	37.6	–6.7
Thurrock Ind.	Russell Cherry	332	22.7	N/A
Majority		30	2.1	–9.2
Turnout		1,467	32.3	+1.8
Registered electors		4,539		
Conservative hold		Swing	▼4.7	

=== Ockendon ===
Ockendon
Party	Candidate	Votes	%	±%
Conservative	Andrew Jefferies*	1,014	48.3	–5.5
Labour	Gary Watson	839	39.9	–6.3
Thurrock Ind.	Ross Byrne	248	11.8	N/A
Majority		175	8.4	+0.8
Turnout		2,110	25.3	+1.9
Registered electors		8,333		
Conservative hold		Swing	▲0.6	

=== Stanford East & Corringham Town ===
Stanford East & Corringham Town
Party	Candidate	Votes	%	±%
Labour	John Cecil	667	37.2	+7.7
Conservative	Shane Ralph*	568	31.7	–14.7
Independent	Roy Jones	559	31.2	N/A
Majority		99	5.5	N/A
Turnout		1,806	28.6	+0.4
Registered electors		6,317		
Labour gain from Thurrock Ind.		Swing	▲11.2	

=== Stanford-le-Hope West ===
Stanford-le-Hope West
Party	Candidate	Votes	%	±%
Independent	Neil Speight	643	38.1	N/A
Labour	Philip Smith	532	31.6	+9.6
Conservative	Shane Hebb*	511	30.3	–20.1
Majority		111	6.5	N/A
Turnout		1,691	30.5	
Registered electors		5,537		
Independent gain from Conservative		Swing	N/A	

=== Stifford Clays ===
Stifford Clays
Party	Candidate	Votes	%	±%
Labour	Mark Hooper	610	40.9	–6.1
Conservative	Gavin Holland	476	31.9	–21.1
Thurrock Ind.	Jennifer Smith*	340	22.8	N/A
Green	Jack Beauchamp-Stansfield	64	4.3	N/A
Majority		134	9.0	N/A
Turnout		1,498	29.9	+1.2
Registered electors		5,006		
Labour gain from Thurrock Ind.		Swing	▼7.5	

=== The Homesteads ===
The Homesteads
Party	Candidate	Votes	%	±%
Thurrock Ind.	Gary Byrne*	942	42.6	N/A
Conservative	Shamim Miah	603	27.2	–38.7
Labour	Tony Benson	544	24.6	–9.5
Reform UK	Bill Poskitt	124	5.6	N/A
Majority		339	15.4	N/A
Turnout		2,229	35.0	+1.8
Registered electors		6,376		
Thurrock Ind. hold		Swing	N/A	

=== Tilbury Riverside & Thurrock Park ===
Tilbury Riverside & Thurrock Park
Party	Candidate	Votes	%	±%
Labour	Cici Manwa	486	45.0	+11.0
Independent	Craig Austin	451	41.7	N/A
Conservative	Allen Mayes*	144	13.3	–9.2
Majority		35	3.3	N/A
Turnout		1,083	22.4	–4.0
Registered electors		4,826		
Labour gain from Thurrock Ind.		Swing	N/A	

=== West Thurrock & South Stifford ===
West Thurrock & South Stifford
Party	Candidate	Votes	%	±%
Labour Co-op	Aaron Green	1,098	58.9	+12.6
Conservative	Tunde Ojetola	765	41.1	–12.6
Majority		333	17.8	N/A
Turnout		1,892	21.2	–3.5
Registered electors		8,908		
Labour Co-op hold		Swing	▲12.6	

== Changes 2023–2024 ==
Sue Sammons, elected as a Conservative, left the party in July 2023 to sit as an independent.

The Thurrock Independents disbanded in July 2023, with their one remaining councillor, Gary Byrne, then becoming an independent.
