= Thurrock Independents =

- Abbreviation: TIP
- Leader: Gary Byrne
- Chairman: Oliver Smith
- Founded: 26 January 2018; 7 years ago (official launch)
- Dissolved: 26 July 2023; 2 years ago
- Split from: UK Independence Party
- Headquarters: 171 Blackshots Lane; Grays, Thurrock; RM16 2LJ
- Ideology: Localism; Populism; Nonpartisanism
- Political position: Catch-all
- Colors: Yellow
- Slogan: People First
- Thurrock Council: 1 / 49

Website
- thurrockindy.org

The Thurrock Independents, also known as the Thurrock Independents Party (TIP), was a localist and populist British political party based in Thurrock, Essex, England. It was formed in January 2018 when seventeen Thurrock councillors, including then-East of England MEP Tim Aker, broke-away from the UK Independence Party (UKIP) after claiming to have grown disillusioned with party politics. At its height in 2018, the party was Thurrock Council's official opposition group and had two members in the European Parliament. It declined after multiple defections and election defeats and was left with only one councillor after the 2023 elections. The party disbanded later that year.

== Description ==
Although Tim Aker joined his council colleagues in the new group, he subsequently stated that he would continue to represent UKIP in the European Parliament for the purposes of Brexit: "UKIP has a job to do in the European Parliament in seeing we get the Brexit we voted for. I will stay as a UKIP MEP. But to better represent my constituents in Aveley, I had no choice but to follow my colleagues and represent the Thurrock Independents." This situation led to some uncertainty about the status of some of the group's members as a number of them work for Aker. Aker subsequently left UKIP and sat for the Thurrock Independents in the European Parliament. In October 2018, he was joined by former UKIP MEP Bill Etheridge, who defected to the party for a brief period before joining the Libertarian Party. Aker later left to join the Brexit Party in February 2019. He resigned his seat on Thurrock Council having moved away from Thurrock; the group lost the subsequent by-election.

In 2018, the former party leadership defected to the Conservative party; and were followed soon after by two incumbent councillors who joined the Conservative Group in November 2018. Following losses in the 2018 local election, this left the party with just ten councillors.

During the 2019 United Kingdom local elections, Allen Mayes took the Tilbury Riverside ward of Thurrock from Labour.

In December 2019, party leader Luke Spillman and his deputy Jack Duffin announced plans to leave the party and step down as councillors in Spring 2021. However, in January 2021 both defected to the Conservatives, keeping their seats on the council. The leader of the party is now Gary Byrne.

As of the 2023 Thurrock Council election, the party was left with just one councillor (Gary Byrne) out of 49 in Thurrock Council. The party was de-registered with the Electoral Commission in July 2023, with its remaining councillor becoming an independent.
