= Thurrock Council =

Local authority in England

Thurrock Borough Council

Type
- Type: Unitary authority

Leadership
- Mayor: Bill Cook, Reform UK since 27 May 2026
- Leader: Richard Bingley, Reform UK since 27 May 2026
- Managing Director: Dave Smith since 21 March 2023

Structure
- Seats: 49 councillors
- Political groups: Administration (43) Reform (43) Other parties (6) Labour (4) Conservative (2)
- Length of term: Four years

Elections
- Voting system: First past the post
- Last election: 7 May 2026
- Next election: 2029

Motto
- By Thames to all the peoples of the world

Meeting place
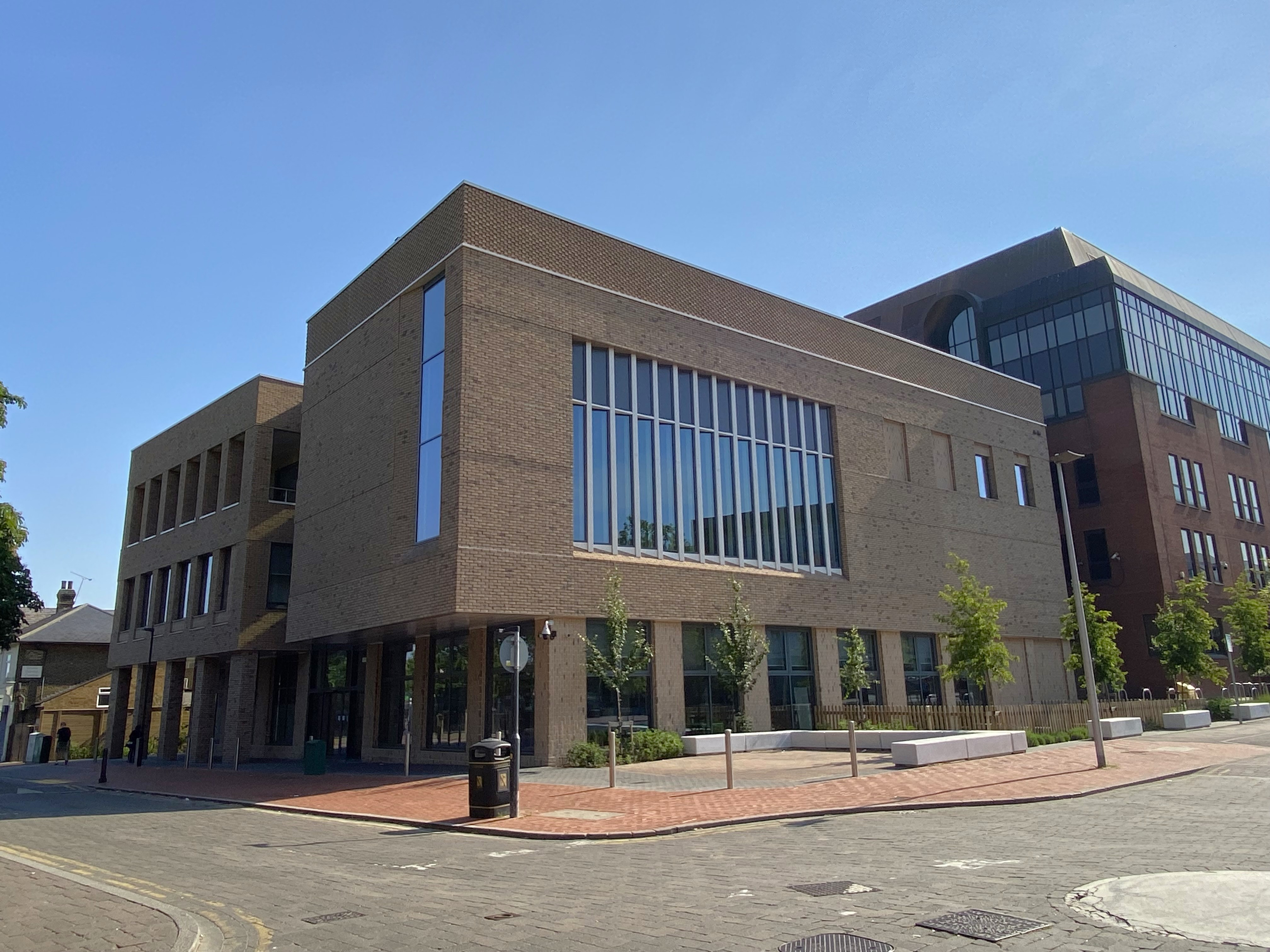
- Thurrock Town Hall, New Road, Grays, RM17 6SL

Website
- www.thurrock.gov.uk

Constitution
- Constitution

Thurrock Council is the local authority for the borough of Thurrock in the ceremonial county of Essex, England. Since 1998 the council has been a unitary authority, being a district council which also performs the functions of a county council. It is a member of the East of England Local Government Association. The council is based in Grays.

In 2022 the council's level of debt arising from failed investments led to it issuing a Section 114 notice, being the local authority equivalent of declaring bankruptcy. The government directed neighbouring Essex County Council to take over Thurrock's finances and also appointed a new managing director for the council.

== History ==
Thurrock Urban District had been created in 1936 from the former urban districts of Grays Thurrock, Purfleet and Tilbury and the Orsett Rural District.

Urban districts were abolished in 1974 under the Local Government Act 1972. A new non-metropolitan district called Thurrock was created covering almost the same area as the former Thurrock Urban District, with just a minor change on the border with Basildon to place the whole designated area for Basildon new town in that district. The reformed Thurrock district was given borough status at the same time, allowing the council to call itself "Thurrock Borough Council" and letting the chair of the council the title of mayor.

The council was made a unitary authority on 1 April 1998, taking over county-level services in the area from Essex County Council. The way the change was implemented was to create a new non-metropolitan county of Thurrock covering the borough, but with no separate county council; instead, the existing borough council took over county council functions, making it a unitary authority. Since 1998 the council has generally styled itself "Thurrock Council" rather than "Thurrock Borough Council". Thurrock remains part of the ceremonial county of Essex for the purposes of lieutenancy.

The planning function for large developments was exercised by the Thurrock Thames Gateway Development Corporation in the whole of the borough from 2003 to 2012.

=== Financial difficulties ===
In 2020, it emerged that the council had borrowed £420 million to buy into the solar power market, eventually rising to a total investment of £655 million. One of the companies in which the council had invested, Toucan Energy, went into administration on 11 November 2022. Businessman Liam Kavanagh is accused of cheating the council out of as much as £130 million in relation to the deals. Thurrock also made a £94 million loan to the Just Loans Group plc, a business lender which went bankrupt in June 2022.

On 2 September 2022, the Secretary of State for Levelling Up, Housing and Communities intervened in the running of Thurrock Council, passing financial control of the council to Essex County Council, as well as ordering a Best Value Inspection, in response to concerns about the council's level of financial risk and debt. The council's financial exposure arises from loans of more than a billion pounds used to fund commercial investments. Council leader Rob Gledhill resigned on 2 September 2022, the day the government intervention was announced.

On 29 November 2022, Thurrock Council admitted that in that financial year it had a near £500 million budget deficit, mostly from failed investments. It asked for emergency financial assistance from the government. On 19 December 2022 the council issued a Section 114 notice barring any new expenditure, being the local authority equivalent of declaring bankruptcy. In March 2023 the government appointed a new managing director for the council, Dave Smith.

== Governance ==
As a unitary authority, Thurrock Council provides all local government services, albeit with oversight of the council's finances from Essex County Council since the government intervention in September 2022. There are no civil parishes in the borough, which is an unparished area.

=== Political control ===
The council has been under Reform majority control since the 2026 election.

Political control of the council since the 1974 reforms has been as follows:

Lower tier non-metropolitan district

Party in control	Years
Labour	1974–1979
No overall control	1979–1982
Labour	1982–1998

Unitary authority

Party in control	Years
Labour	1998–2004
Conservative	2004–2007
No overall control	2007–2012
Labour	2012–2014
No overall control	2014–2021
Conservative	2021–2024
No overall control	2024–2024
Labour	2024–2026
Reform	2026–present

=== Leadership ===
The role of Mayor of Thurrock is largely ceremonial, usually being held by a different councillor each year. Political leadership is instead provided by the leader of the council. The leaders since 1989 have been:

Councillor	Party	From	To
Jimmy Aberdein	Labour	1989	1995
Andy Smith	Labour	1995	30 Jun 2004
Anne Cheale	Conservative	30 Jun 2004	May 2006
Terry Hipsey	Conservative	24 May 2006	25 Mar 2009
Garry Hague	Conservative	25 Mar 2009	19 May 2010
John Kent	Labour	19 May 2010	25 May 2016
Rob Gledhill	Conservative	25 May 2016	2 Sep 2022
Mark Coxshall	Conservative	13 Oct 2022	May 2023
Andrew Jefferies	Conservative	24 May 2023	22 May 2024
John Kent	Labour	22 May 2024	28 April 2025
Lynn Worrall	Labour	21 May 2025	May 2026
Richard Bingley	Reform	27 May 2026	

=== Composition ===
Following the 2026 election, and the subsequent resignation of two Reform councillors, the composition of the council is as follows:

Party	Councillors
Reform	43
Labour	4
Conservative	2
Total	49

=== Thurrock Youth Cabinet ===
Thurrock Council also operates Thurrock Youth Cabinet, an elected youth council of young people in the borough aged 11 to 18, or 11 to 25 if they have a disability or special needs. Members are elected from schools or local youth groups to represent one of the 20 wards of Thurrock and have to live, study or work in the borough. The Member of Youth Parliament and the Deputy Member of Youth Parliament for Thurrock also sit on the youth cabinet.

== Premises ==
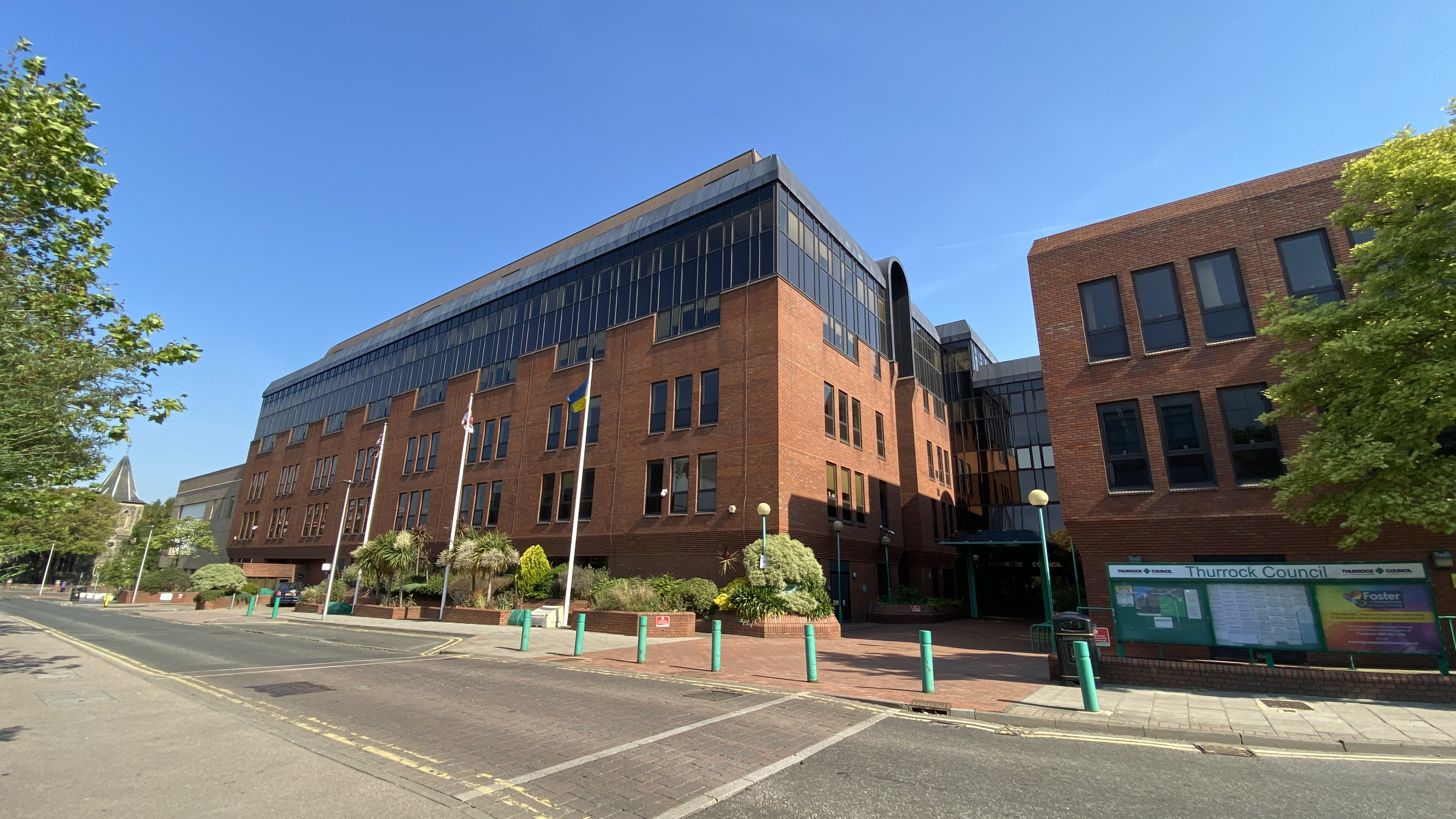
Civic Offices, New Road, Grays: The 1986 original building to the right of the entrance, 1992 central block in the middle and 2022 block to the far left.

The council is based at Thurrock Town Hall on New Road in Grays. When the council was created in 1974 it used the former offices of the Thurrock Urban District Council in a converted house called Farley and adjoining buildings around the junction of Whitehall Lane and Palmers Avenue in Grays. In 1986 the council built itself a new headquarters at the corner of New Road and Derby Bridge Road in the centre of Grays. The building has subsequently been extended westward along New Road with a large central block added in 1992 and a new wing at the corner of New Road and High Street completed in 2022.

== Elections ==
Since the last boundary changes in 2004, the council has comprised 49 councillors representing 20 wards, with each ward electing two or three councillors. Elections are held three years out of every four, electing a third of the council each time for a four-year term. In the fourth year of the cycle there is no election. This system will change from 2025, with elections being held every four years for the whole council.

=== Wards ===
The wards, with their numbers on the map below, are:

- Aveley and Uplands (1)
- Belhus (3)
- Chadwell St Mary (14)
- Chafford and North Stifford (6)
- Corringham and Fobbing (17)
- East Tilbury (15)
- Grays Riverside (7)
- Grays Thurrock (8)
- Little Thurrock Blackshots (10)
- Little Thurrock Rectory (11)
- Ockendon (2)
- Orsett (20)
- South Chafford (5)
- Stanford East and Corringham Town (18)
- Stanford-le-Hope West (16)
- Stifford Clays (9)
- The Homesteads (19)
- Tilbury Riverside and Thurrock Park (12)
- Tilbury St Chads (13)
- West Thurrock and South Stifford (4)

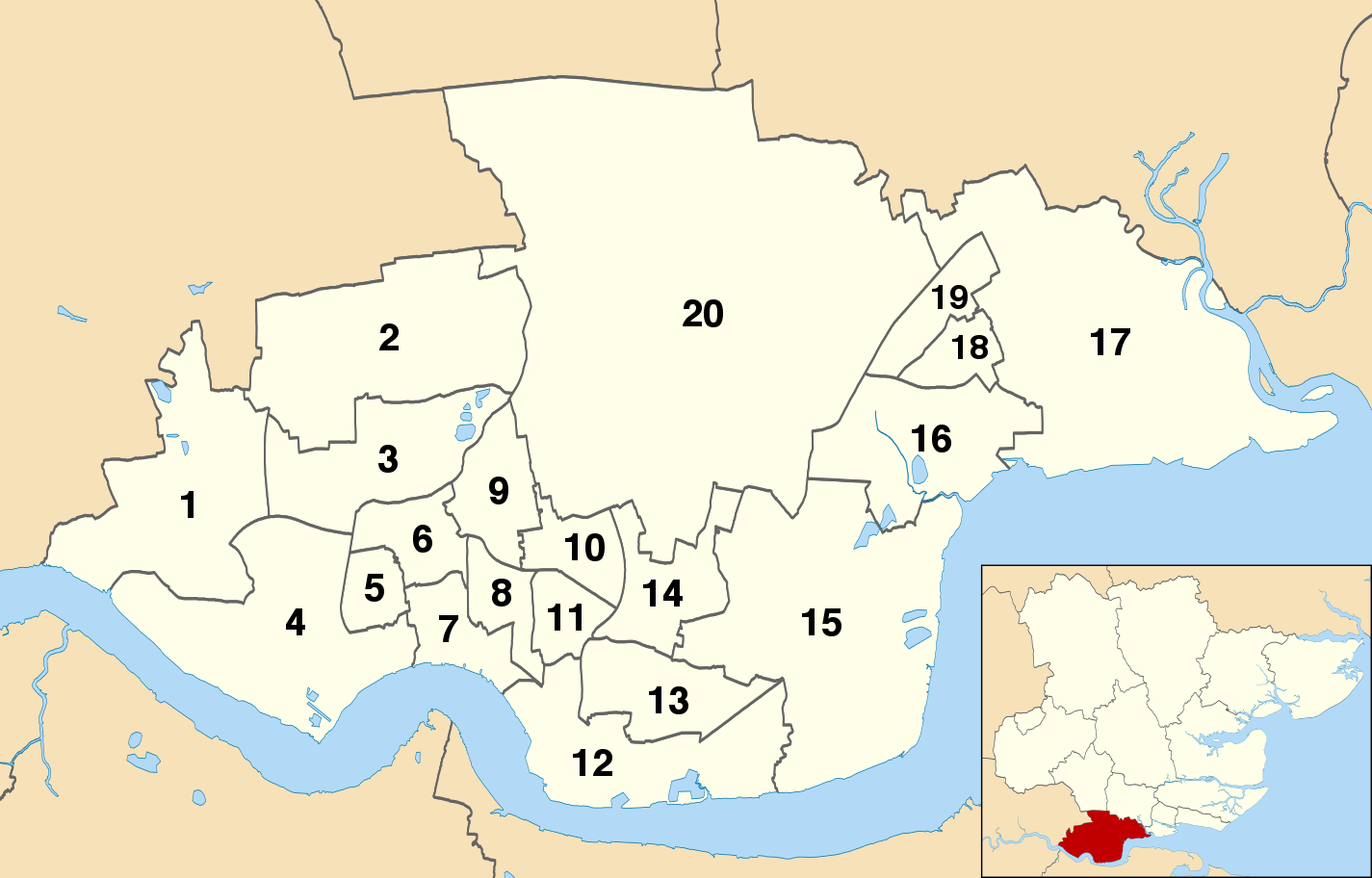

== Arms ==
Coat of arms of Thurrock Council
Notes Shield and crest originally granted to Thurrock Urban District Council on 17 January 1957. Supporters granted on 14 May 1976. Crest On a wreath of the colours an Albatross rising Proper from a bollard Sable roped Or. Escutcheon Argent on a fess wavy between in chief a ship's screw and a wheel Azure and in base a Celtic cross also Azure charged in the centre with a Tudor rose Proper three lymphads Argent. Supporters On the dexter a sea-lion guardant Or gutty Sable the tail Vert gutty Or and Argent holding in the dexter claw a block Or tackle Sable and on the sinister a knight in armour tempus 1370 resting the exterior hand on the hilt of his sheathed sword a hound at his feet all Proper upon a compartment per pale water barry wavy Argent and Azure and a representation of a stone quay Proper. Motto Secundum Tamesim Quovis Gentium (By The Thames To All The Peoples of the World).

== Mayors ==
The mayors since 1982 have included:

Councillor	Party	From	To
Bob Wood	Labour	1982	1983
Sid Josling	Labour	1984	1985
Arthur Clarke	Labour	1985	1986
George Watts	Labour	1988	1989
John Dunn	Labour	1989	1990
Ken Evans	Labour	1990	1991
Kitty Price	Labour	1991	1992
Pat Rice	Labour	1993	1994
Barry Palmer	Labour	1994	1995
Reg Lee	Labour	1995	1996
Sid Josling	Labour	1996	1997
Arthur Bennett	Labour	1997	1998
Albert Vandersteen	Labour	1998	1999
Carl Morris	Labour	1999	2000
Julian Norris	Labour	2000	2001
Barrie Lawrence	Labour	2001	2002
Gordon Barton	Labour	2002	2003
Gerard Rice	Labour	2003	2004
Ian Harrison	Conservative	2004	2005
Colin Churchman	Conservative	2005	2006
Joy Redsell	Conservative	2006	2007
Diane Revell	Conservative	2007	2008
John Everett	Conservative	2008	2009
Maureen Pearce	Conservative	2009	2010
Anne Cheale	Thurrock Concerned Conservative	2010	2011
Yash Gupta	Labour	2011	2013
Tony Fish	Labour	2013	2014
Steve Liddiard	Labour	2014	2015
Sue Gray	Labour	2015	2016
Cathy Kent	Labour	2016	2017
Tunde Ojetola	Conservative	2017	2018
Barbara Rice	Labour	2018	2019
Terry Piccolo	Conservative	2019	2021
Sue Shinnick	Labour	2021	2022
James Halden	Conservative	2022	2023
Sue Little	Conservative	2023	2024
Kairen Raper	Labour	2024	2025
Sue Shinnick	Labour	2025	2026
Bill Cook	Reform	2026	

== See also ==
Thurrock, the area with borough status which this council administers.
