= Blackshots =

Housing estate and ward in Thurrock, Essex, England

Coordinates: 51.49296°N 0.34578°E

- Housing estate and ward
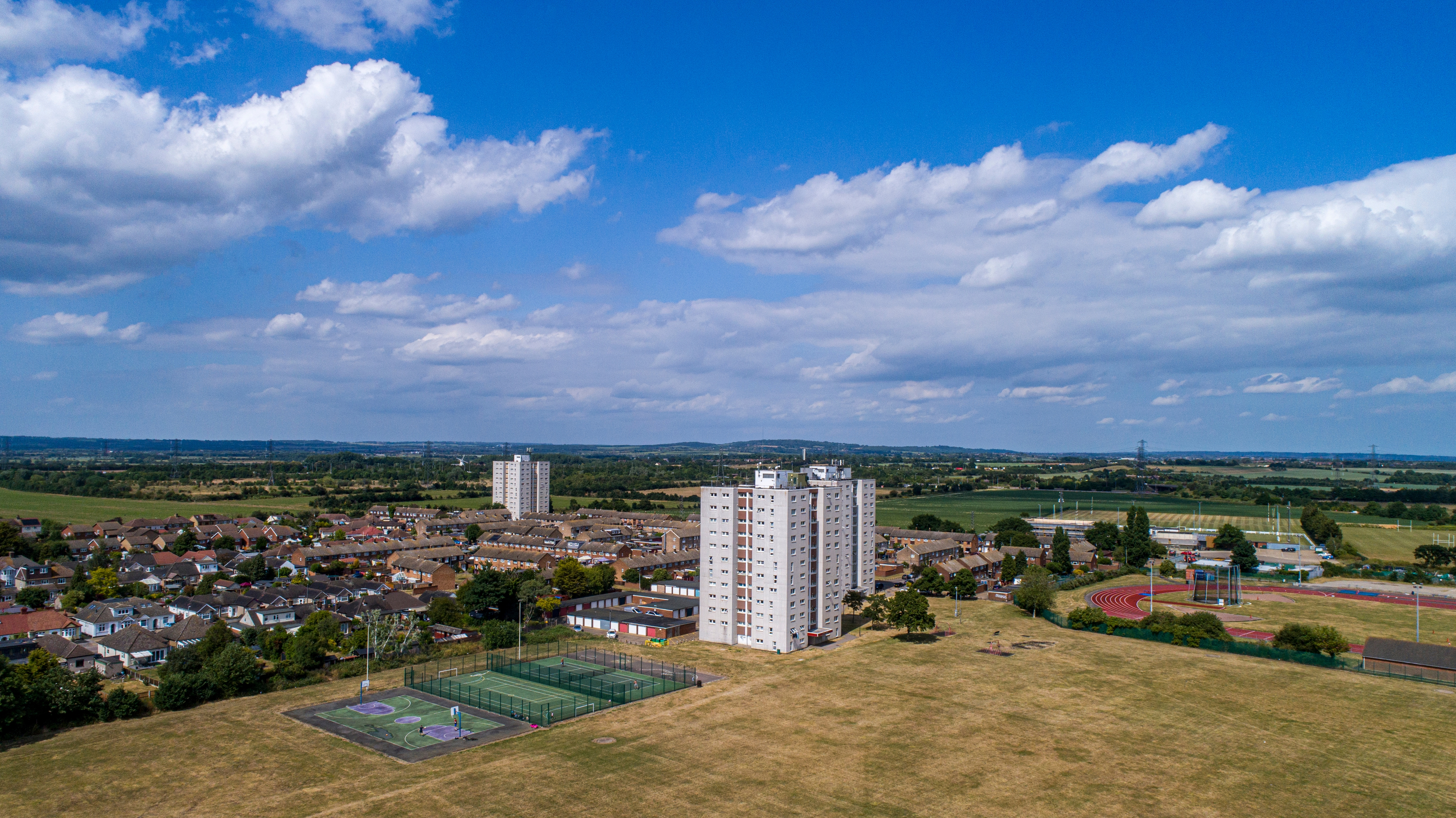
- Aerial view of Blackshots in 2025

- Location within Essex
- Population: 7,081 (2021 census)
- OS grid reference: TQ629797
  - London: 22.6 mi (36.4 km) W
- Unitary authority: Thurrock
- Ceremonial county: Essex
- Region: East
- Country: England
- Sovereign state: United Kingdom
- Post town: GRAYS
- Postcode district: RM16
- Dialling code: 01375
- Police: Essex
- Fire: Essex
- Ambulance: East of England
- UK Parliament: Thurrock

Little Thurrock Blackshots, more commonly known as just Blackshots, is a housing estate and ward in the Little Thurrock area of Grays in Thurrock, Essex, England. It is located in the north-east of the town, five minutes away from Grays Town Centre. It had a population of 7,081 in the 2021 census.

Historically, Blackshots was a farm. The land at the farm was marked for development by Thurrock Urban District Council in 1928 and acquired by the council in 1938. The construction of the housing estate took place between the 1930s and 1960s. Since the early 2020s, Thurrock Council has planned to redevelop the estate after local residents raised safety concerns about outdated tower block developments which are no longer fit for purpose.

== History ==
The name Blackshots was first recorded in the court rolls of the manor of Little Thurrock in 1472 as Blakeshote. Historically, the land now occupied by the Blackshots housing estate was home to Blackshots farm. Archaeological evidence suggests that a stream once ran through the area during the Late Iron Age.

In 1928, the land at Blackshots farm was identified for development by Thurrock Urban District Council. In 1932, the council acquired the land to build a public playing field and leisure centre. In 1938, the council approved proposals to build a housing estate on the site with 20 houses and bungalows, a maternity centre and a branch library. It also set aside 60 acres of green space and designated it as a King George's playing field.

Construction took place sporadically over the next three decades. Blackshots Library was completed and opened in 1953. King George's Field was integrated into a council scheme to develop sporting facilities on the field and build an interconnected leisure centre. This scheme was completed in 1964 with the opening of Blackshots Leisure Centre and included a civic hall, rugby and football pitches, a public swimming pool and a small stadium and pavilion. It cost the council an estimated £556,000, with additional voluntary contributions made by local residents.

The rest of the estate was built in the 1960s. From 1966, Thurrock Council built the new Blackshots Park tower block development, which provided 168 new homes. In other parts of the estate, new dwellings were built. Most of these dwellings are two storey semi-detached or terraced housing. Since the 1980s, a very high proportion of these homes have been bought by their occupants under the Right to Buy scheme.

In 2019, Blackshots Pavilion was demolished with plans to replace it with a new sports centre. In the early 2020s, Thurrock Council moved to redevelop other parts of the estate after campaigners raised safety concerns about the tower blocks at Blackshots Park, which were deteriorating with common outbreaks of damp and mould and could not be refurbished because of their age. After a public consultation with local residents in 2021 and 2022, the council confirmed it would demolish the Blackshots Park tower blocks and redevelop the Blackshots estate, subject to further consultation. Residents have been moved out of the tower blocks since 2023.

== Geography ==
Blackshots is a housing estate in the Little Thurrock area of Grays, a town in the borough of Thurrock in Essex, England. It is one of several distinct areas which collectively make up the town, including the West Thurrock and Lakeside areas, Chafford Hundred, South Stifford, Grays Town Centre, Stifford Clays and the rest of Little Thurrock. It is located in the north-east of the town and in the north of Little Thurrock, five minutes away from Grays Town Centre. It is part of the Grays Urban Area, which had a recorded population of 99,462 at the 2021 census.

The eastern border of Blackshots runs along the A1089 road, where it borders Chadwell St Mary and Orsett Heath. The southern border runs along Lodge Lane, Wood View Road and the B149 road, where it borders the rest of Little Thurrock and central Grays. The estate borders Stifford Clays near Long Lane, Blackshots Lane and Victoria Avenue to the west and Orsett near Fairfield Lane and Long Lane to the north.

== Facilities ==
=== Blackshots Park ===
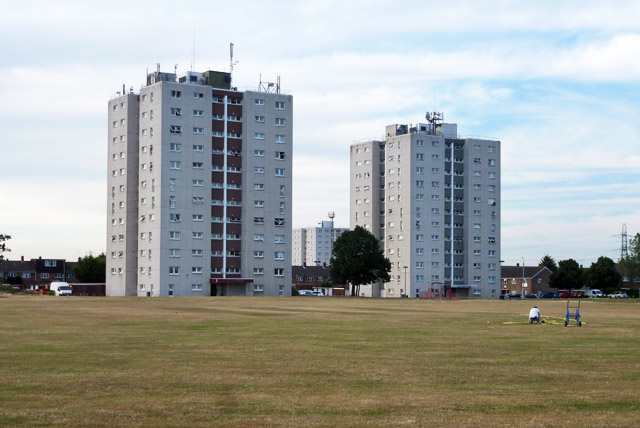
Bevan House (left) and Morrison House (right) in 2015. Keir Hardie House can be seen between the two blocks in the background.

Dominating the estate is the Blackshots Park tower block development, which is also known as Blackshots Towers. Located on the northern boundary of King George's Field, Blackshots Park includes three tower blocks split between two sites, one in the north of the estate and one in the south of the estate. The northern site is home to Keir Hardie House on Milford Road while the southern site is home to Bevan House off Laird Avenue and Morrison House on Jesmond Road, which sit beside each other.

Blackshots Park was built in the 1960s from 1966. The construction of the development cost around £2 million in 1966 and was contracted by Thurrock Urban District Council to the construction firm Selleck Nicholls Williams. The three tower blocks are 12-storeys tall with 56 dwellings each, providing for a total of 168 dwellings. They were named after three influential Labour Party politicians from the 20th century, Keir Hardie, Aneurin Bevan and Herbert Morrison.

While most houses in the wider Blackshots estate are owned by their occupants under the Right to Buy scheme, the majority of the dwellings in the Blackshots Park development have been rented to tenants by Thurrock Council. Many of the flats in the tower blocks were sold off to their occupants under the scheme in the 1990s, but were then bought back by the council at their original ask price after banks and building societies refused to grant mortgages to the occupants, who were also unexpectedly forced to contribute to the general building works and maintenance of the blocks, including cladding work, roof work and the installation of new lifts, which they struggled to afford. Thurrock Council later discovered that the cladding had been inadequately installed, which it said caused a risk of "serious injury or death" to residents, and ordered works on the blocks to replace the cladding in 2009.

Further safety concerns emerged after the Grenfell Tower fire of 2017. Thurrock Council moved to renovate the three tower blocks in 2020, stating that their external cladding failed to meet fire safety regulations and were "showing signs of failure and considered to be beyond economic repair". In the same year, local newspaper Thurrock Nub News investigated the three tower blocks and found that the buildings were deteriorating with poor living conditions for local residents, with constant outbreaks of damp and mould and other issues such as water leakages and high humidity in the flats making it impossible to live in some rooms. Local residents and campaigners called for the tower blocks to be demolished with their residents rehoused, and in 2021 Thurrock Council opened a consultation with their occupants asking them for their views on the future of the blocks, including if they should be renovated and refurbished or if they should be demolished with residents rehoused.

The consultation was completed in 2022, with 71% of the residents who took part expressing their preference for the demolition of the tower blocks. A Thurrock Council report also stated that the buildings were outdated and no longer fit for purpose, and that they also attracted the most complaints from local residents about damp and mould of all the tower blocks in Thurrock. It determined that, even if they were refurbished, the three blocks would still not be fit for purpose because of their age and the poor conditions of the buildings. The council therefore decided to redevelop the Blackshots Park development and the wider Blackshots estate, with the tower blocks to be demolished and replaced by new low-rise or mid-rise social housing.

Most tenants of Blackshots Park have been rehoused by Thurrock Council since 2023 ahead of the planned demolition and redevelopment of the area, though some residents still remain.

=== King George's Field ===
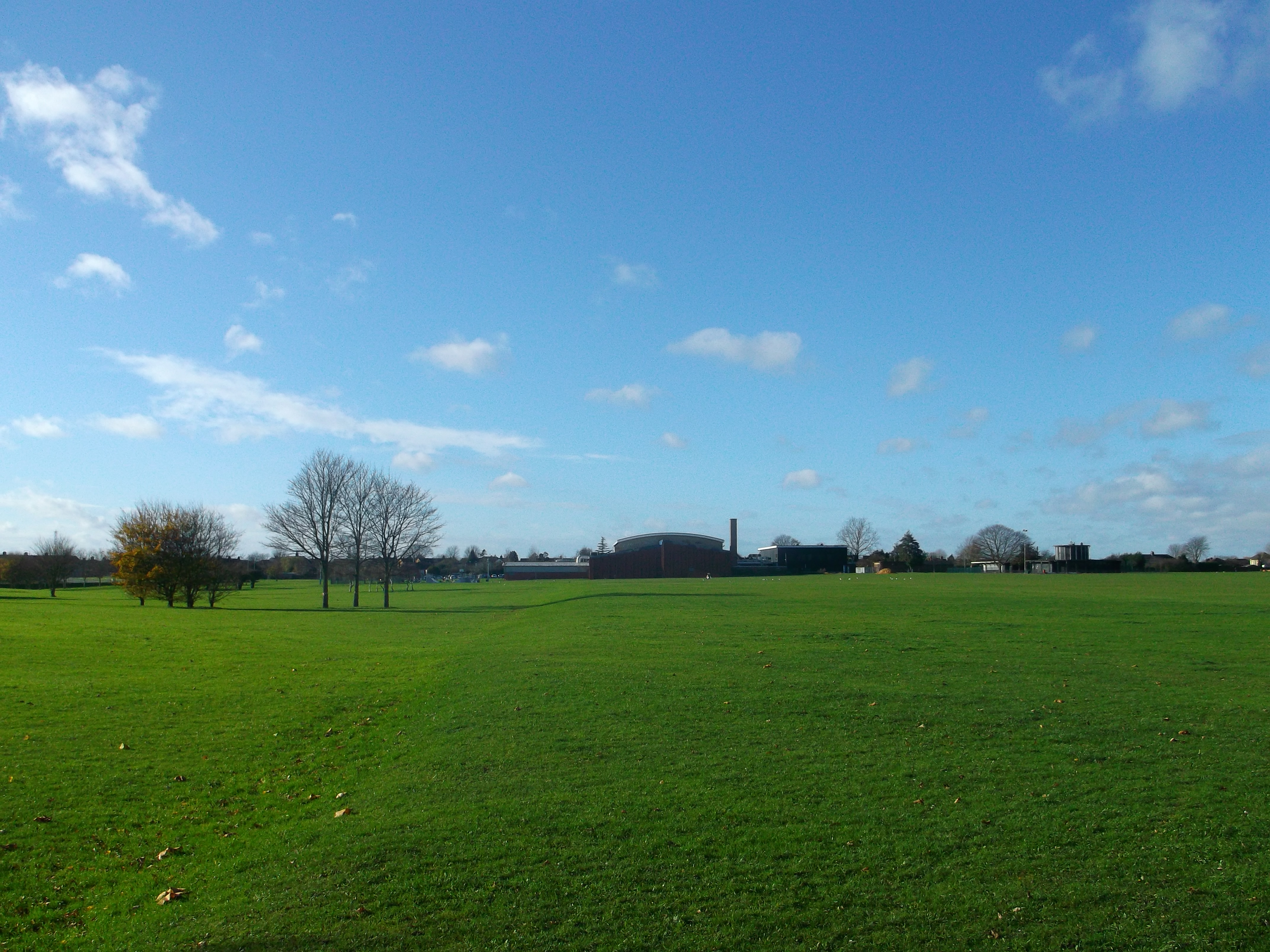
A view across King George's Field in 2012 looking west. Blackshots Leisure Centre can be seen in the distance.

King George's Field was designated on 7 December 1938 as one of several King George's public playing fields in the United Kingdom dedicated to the memory of King George V. The field is managed, protected and maintained by Fields in Trust. At 60 acres, it is the largest open green space in Grays. It is designated green belt land.

King George's Field was developed alongside the construction of Blackshots Leisure Centre from the 1930s to 1960s and has seen extensive development as an open recreational green space. The field includes several sporting and games facilities, including a seven-lane running track, multiple rugby and football pitches, a basketball court, a skatepark, bowling greens, a small stadium and a playground. The field is also used by several local sports clubs, including Thurrock Rugby Football Club which helps to maintain the pitches. Orsett Heath Academy is also situated on the field.

In 2024, Thurrock Council announced plans to construct 258 new homes on the northern part of the field to replace the Blackshots Park tower blocks once they were demolished, as part of its planned redevelopment of Blackshots. These plans attracted significant local backlash, with local campaigners calling for the green belt to be protected and arguing that the playing field was a valuable resource for the local community. Former Thurrock mayor and Blackshots councillor Joy Redsell organised a petition against the plans in 2024, which was signed by 2,300 local residents and debated at a session of the council in 2025. The council responded by abandoning the plans and collaborating on the redevelopment with local stakeholders, with a new proposal to build the homes on the site of a nearby farm now considered.

=== Blackshots Leisure Centre ===
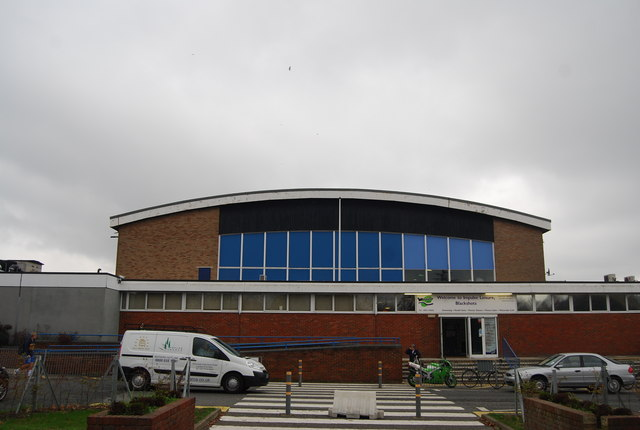
Blackshots Leisure Centre in 2009.

Blackshots Leisure Centre was built between the 1930s and 1960s. It was officially completed and opened on 19 September 1964. The leisure centre is a civic and recreation centre. Built at a cost of £502,000, it includes a 33-metre public swimming pool, civic hall, gym, health suite, sauna, café and several exercise studios. The annual Thurrock Beer Festival is held at the civic hall.

Since 2000, Thurrock Council has outsourced the management of the leisure centre to Impulse Leisure, a local charitable trust. In 2005, Impulse Leisure won a £30,000 grant from Sport England to expand the gym's facilities to make it more inclusive for disabled people. In 2024, Impulse Leisure co-founded the Swimming Teacher's Academy with the Institute of Swimming which offers lessons at Blackshots Leisure Centre.

=== Blackshots Library ===
Blackshots Library was approved for construction in 1938 and formally opened on 16 May 1953 with Thurrock MP Hugh Delargy and council chairman A. Jones in attendance.

== Politics and governance ==
Blackshots is in the parliamentary constituency of Thurrock. The local member of Parliament (MP) is Jen Craft of the Labour Party, who was first elected at the 2024 general election. The local authority is Thurrock Council which has held unitary authority status since 1998. As such, the council is responsible for all local government services in the area. The Blackshots area also falls under the jurisdiction of Essex Police and the Essex County Fire and Rescue Service which are overseen by the elected Police, Fire and Crime Commissioner for Essex. Since 2016, the police, fire and crime commissioner has been Roger Hirst of the Conservative Party.

For the purposes of local elections to Thurrock Council, Blackshots forms a single electoral ward which elects two councillors who serve for a term of four years. Until 1997, the estate was united with the rest of Little Thurrock in the Little Thurrock ward, which elected three councillors. In 1997, Blackshots was split off to form its own ward to account for population growth in the borough of Thurrock. The ward has had its current boundaries since 2004.

Historically, the Blackshots area was more supportive of the Labour Party. The area started to shift away from Labour at the turn of the 21st century, with Conservative candidates winning the ward in the 1999 and 2000 Thurrock Council elections while Labour still won the ward in the 1997 and 2001 council elections. From the 2004 council election, the ward was won by the Conservatives at every election before shifting back to Labour in the 2024 council election. During this period, one of the councillors for the ward was Joy Redsell, the Conservative mayor of Thurrock, who lost her seat to the Labour Party in 2024.
