= Stifford Clays =

Coordinates: 51.50277°N 0.32570°E

- Housing estate and ward
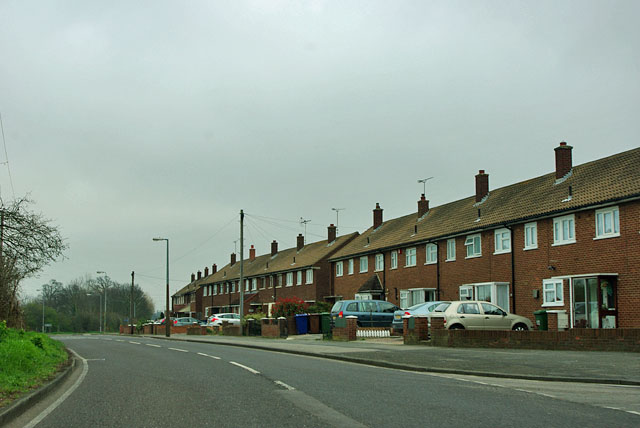
- Housing on Stifford Clays Road

- Location within Essex
- Population: 6,755 (2021 census)
- OS grid reference: TQ615807
  - London: 22.0 mi (35.4 km) W
- Unitary authority: Thurrock
- Ceremonial county: Essex
- Region: East
- Country: England
- Sovereign state: United Kingdom
- Post town: GRAYS
- Postcode district: RM16
- Dialling code: 01375
- Police: Essex
- Fire: Essex
- Ambulance: East of England
- UK Parliament: Thurrock

Stifford Clays, historically also known as Fleethall and Clay's Hall, is a housing estate and ward in the Stifford area of Grays in Thurrock, Essex, England. It is situated on a 660-acre site north of central Grays and borders North Stifford and Chafford Hundred to the west, Blackshots to the east and Belhus and Orsett to the north. It had a population of 6,755 in the 2021 census.

There is evidence of human settlement or occupation in what is now Stifford Clays during the Iron Age and Roman, Saxon and Medieval periods. The earliest records of Stifford Clays date to the 15th century, when it was a manorial estate held by Maurice Bruyn, who later passed it to John Clay, who gave it its name. Historically home to a farmstead, the land was developed into a housing estate by Thurrock Urban District Council in the 1950s and 1960s.

== History ==
There is archaeological evidence to suggest an extensive period of human settlement in what is now Stifford Clays as far back as possibly the Neolithic or Bronze Age, and certainly the Early Iron Age. There is further evidence of human presence in the Late Iron Age and the Roman, Saxon and Medieval periods. According to local legend, there was a settlement in the area that was torched some 2,000 years ago.

The earliest known records of Stifford Clays date to the 15th century. Stifford Clays was first recorded in 1412 under the name of Fleethall, after the Mardyke river on which Stifford Clays is situated, which was historically known as the Fleet. (Note: Alternatively spelt as the Flet and Flethall or the Flete and Fletehall.) At that time, Stifford Clays was a manorial estate in the ancient parish of Stifford. In 1462, it was in the possession of Maurice Bruyn, who then passed it on to John Clay, for whom it was then named after; the name Stifford Clays is itself a corruption of the name Clay's Hall, which became the name of the manor after it came under Clay's possession.

After Clay's possession of the manor, Stifford Clays was passed back to the Bruyn family, who continued to possess the manor until it was passed through marriage to Antony Bradshaw, who died in 1636. The manor continued to change hands between different lords until the 1800s, when it was acquired by Richard Wingfield-Baker. A 1777 map shows a house, orchards and farmstead at Stifford Clays, which still survives today. Stifford Clays Farm, a second surviving farmhouse located to the south of this site, dates from the early 19th century.

By 1887, Stifford Clays had come into the possession of Thomas Charles Douglas Whitmore, who passed it down to his son Francis Whitmore. In 1939, Whitmore sold 30 acres of land at Stifford Clays Farm to Nora Mary Billings so she could build a housing estate. Billings began work on the estate but construction was disrupted by the Second World War, with only a few houses and bungalows built. After the war, Billings sold off the land to Thurrock Urban District Council.

From 1952, the council developed the land and the wider area into a housing estate, building it up in the 1950s and 1960s. The Stifford Clays estate was built on a 660-acre site to the north of Lodge Lane in Grays. By 1963, there were 2,039 homes in Stifford Clays, including 1,464 council homes and 575 private dwellings. This period also saw the construction of two churches, a junior school, an infant school and a secondary school. In 1971, work began on a medical centre and dental surgery which was completed and opened in 1972.

== Geography ==
Stifford Clays is a housing estate in the Stifford area of Grays, a town in the borough of Thurrock in Essex, England. It is one of several distinct areas which collectively make up the town, including the West Thurrock and Lakeside areas, Chafford Hundred, South Stifford, Grays Town Centre, Blackshots and Little Thurrock. The estate is situated on a 660-acre site north of Lodge Lane, which forms its southern boundary with central Grays. The northern boundary of Stifford Clays follows the Mardyke river and Green Lane, where it borders the wards of Belhus and Orsett, while in the west the estate borders North Stifford and Chafford Hundred at the A1012 road and the Treacle Mine Roundabout. It also borders Blackshots near Connaught Avenue and Blackshots Lane to the east.

== Politics and governance ==
Stifford Clays is in the parliamentary constituency of Thurrock. The local member of Parliament (MP) is Jen Craft of the Labour Party, who was first elected at the 2024 general election. The local authority is Thurrock Council which has held unitary authority status since 1998. As such, the council is responsible for all local government services in the area. Stifford Clays also falls under the jurisdiction of Essex Police and the Essex County Fire and Rescue Service which are overseen by the elected Police, Fire and Crime Commissioner for Essex. Since 2016, the police, fire and crime commissioner has been Roger Hirst of the Conservative Party.

For the purposes of local elections to Thurrock Council, Stifford Clays forms a single electoral ward which elects two councillors who serve for a term of four years. Until 2004, the estate was united with the rest of Stifford in the Stifford ward, which elected three councillors. In 2004, Stifford Clays was split off to form its own ward to account for population growth in the borough of Thurrock, which is when it took on its current boundaries.

Traditionally, Stifford Clays has been a marginal ward. Since 2002, it has had elected councillors from the Conservative Party, Labour Party, UK Independence Party (UKIP) and Thurrock Independents Party (TIP). In the 2014 council election, the leader of Thurrock UKIP Graham Snell was elected to represent the ward. He left UKIP to found and lead the TIP before losing his seat in the 2018 council election. Another councillor for Stifford Clays was Maureen Pearce of the Conservative Party, who served as the deputy mayor of Thurrock from 2008 to 2009 and mayor of Thurrock from 2009 to 2010. Jen Craft, the future MP for Thurrock, also unsuccessfully contested the ward as the Labour candidate in the 2019 council election.
