= Chafford Hundred =

Suburb of Grays in Thurrock, Essex, England

Coordinates: 51.488°N 0.300°E

- Housing development and suburb
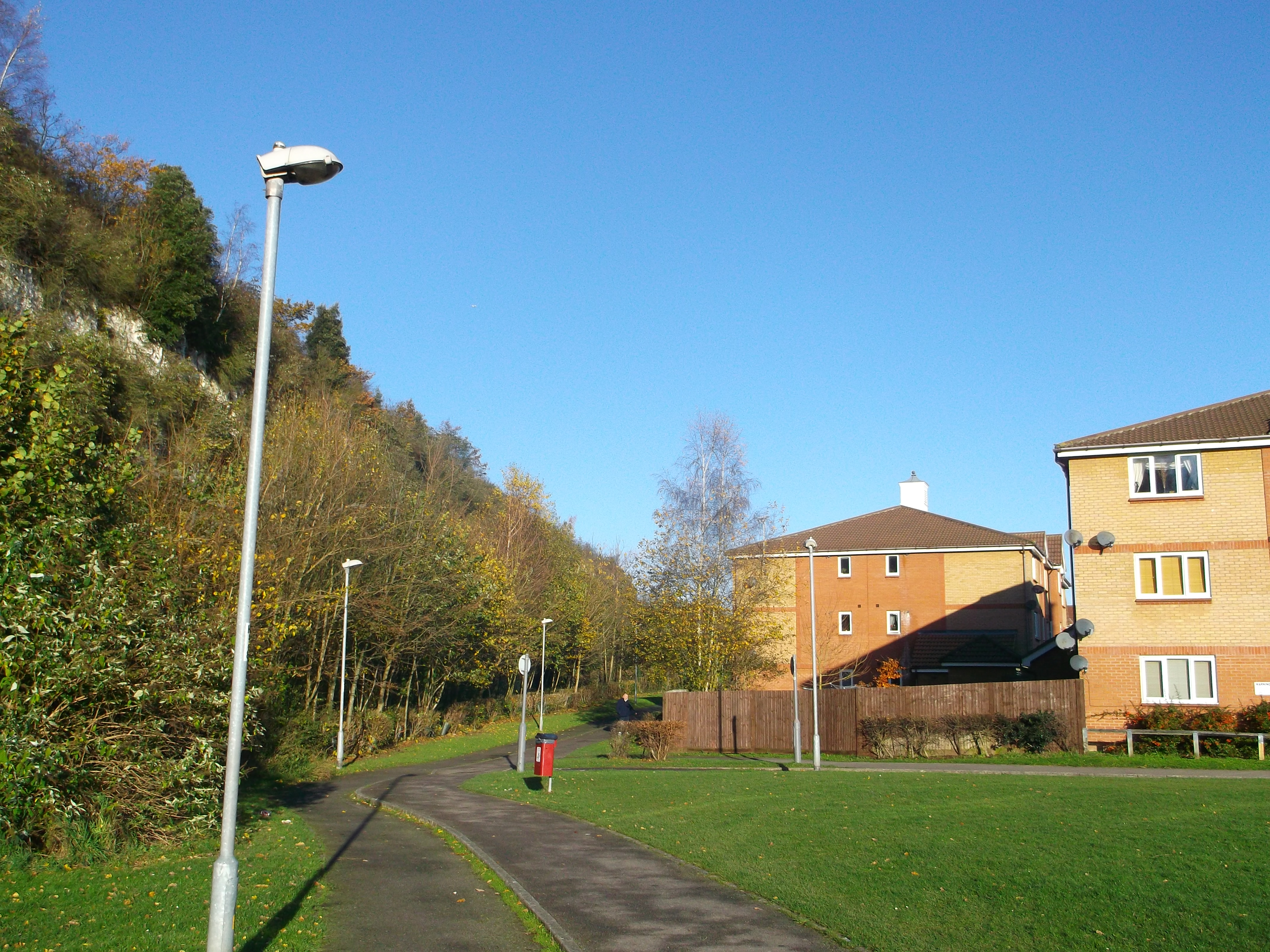
- Cyclepath to Drake Road, Chafford Hundred

- Location within Essex
- Population: 15,699 (2021 census) (Note: Combined population of the electoral wards of South Chafford and Chafford and North Stifford. Also includes the settlement of North Stifford.)
- OS grid reference: TQ595795
  - London: 18.5 mi (29.8 km) W
- Unitary authority: Thurrock
- Ceremonial county: Essex
- Region: East
- Country: England
- Sovereign state: United Kingdom
- Post town: GRAYS
- Postcode district: RM16
- Dialling code: 01375
- Police: Essex
- Fire: Essex
- Ambulance: East of England
- UK Parliament: Thurrock

Chafford Hundred, or simply Chafford, is a housing development and suburb in the town of Grays in the borough of Thurrock in Essex, England. Chafford Hundred is north-west of Grays Town Centre.

Its railway station serves the area and Lakeside Shopping Centre.

Lakeside Shopping Centre is in West Thurrock. Chafford Hundred was built on parts of the historical parishes of Stifford and West Thurrock, Mill Lane being the border of the respective historical parishes. It is located directly between North Stifford and South Stifford.

== History ==
=== Prehistory and Thurrock Chalklands ===
The earliest evidence of human occupation in the area around Chafford Hundred dates back to the prehistoric period, with archeological evidence strongly suggesting the existence of human settlement and agricultural and industrial development in the area from around 8,000 BC in the Mesolithic through to the Neolithic, Bronze, Iron, Roman and Early Medieval periods. Animal fossils and shark fossils dating to the prehistoric period have also been discovered in the area.

By the 19th century, the area had become the site of disused chemical works in Grays Thurrock. In 1870, Edmund Wright Brooks took over the works and turned them into quarries for his cement manufacturing company. Several other cement companies, including the Portland Cement Works Company and the Lion Cement Company, had started quarrying the area by 1874. By 1925, most of these companies had merged to form Associated Portland Cement Manufacturers Ltd, which later became Blue Circle Industries. For much of the 20th century, the area was mainly the site of several chalk, gravel and brickearth quarries, with the last of these closing down in 1976. As such, the area was called the Thurrock Chalklands prior to the development of Chafford Hundred.

By the early 1970s, most of the land in the Thurrock Chalklands had become derelict and abandoned. Blue Circle Industries continued to own most of the land in the area long after the closure of the quarries, and it remained interested in developing the area. In 1973, the local authorities Essex County Council and Thurrock Council looked into regenerating the area with government support. The councils' interests in the area were renewed in 1981 with the completion of the M25 and A13 in Thurrock, which intersected near the area. The location of the Chalklands behind Thurrock's industrial waterfront was seen as having strategic value, and a new development on the site was expected to meet an anticipated increase in local industrial demand caused by the completion of the roads.

Another organisation, the national house-builder Consortium Developments Limited (CDL), also expressed interest in the Chalklands area. CDL had been founded in 1983 by Britain's ten largest house-building companies as a consortium which aimed to promote and build privately developed new towns in South East England. It made its first planning application in March 1985 for a £450 million new town development known as Tillingham Hall on the Metropolitan Green Belt in the north of Thurrock, which would provide 5,100 dwellings for 14,000 people. Thurrock Council and Essex County Council opposed the Tillingham Hall proposal as it would be built on green belt land and blocked planning permission for the project. The project also posed a threat to their ambitions for a development in the Chalklands, and this may have influenced Thurrock's opposition to the proposal. CDL looked at the Chalklands area as a potential alternative development site to Tillingham Hall, prompting Blue Circle Industries to propose a development of its own in the area before CDL could make a planning application there.

=== Construction of Chafford Hundred ===
Blue Circle Industries made a planning application with two other developers, West Thurrock Estates and Tunnel Holdings, to build a housing development on the Chalklands in August 1985. The proposed development was designed by architect Owen Luder and named Chafford Hundred after the historic Hundred of Chafford, which included parts of what is now Havering, Thurrock and Brentwood.

In 1985, Thurrock Council and Essex County Council approved a proposal by Blue Circle Industries, West Thurrock Estates and Tunnel Holdings to build a large landscape-housing estate on derelict land adjacent to the M25 motorway in Grays, Essex. Designed by architect Owen Luder, the proposal included the construction of 5,000 homes, five schools and new shops for a population of 15,000 people, and was estimated to cost £100 million. It was named "Chafford Hundred" after a former Bishop of London and the historic Hundred of Chafford.

The development would be built on a 600-acre site in Grays and West Thurrock, north-west of Grays town centre. Around two-thirds of the site was previously used as a chalk quarry; the rest was mostly former agricultural land which had become uncultivated. Planning permission to reclaim and develop the site to build 5,000 homes was granted in July 1986 and construction began in 1988. Blue Circle Industries formed a consortium with construction companies Rosehaugh and Pearson plc with the trade name Chafford Hundred Ltd to build the development. To pay for construction costs, the consortium took up a £45 million loan to be paid back over the next seven years. By this point, the project included plans for a new church, shopping centre, doctor's surgery, library and a train station on the Fenchurch Street railway line, with an overall estimated cost of £750 million.

The first homes in Chafford Hundred were completed in 1989. Approximately 5,600 houses and flats have been built since 1989 on 353 acres of brownfield housing land. These areas have a variety of housing types which includes private sector housing as well as housing associations and retirement homes. Chafford Hundred railway station serves the local area, and was built to serve the area. It opened in 1993, and currently sees a twice hourly service connecting it to London, Grays and Southend. The name is re-used from the historic Hundred of Chafford, which covered a much larger area including parts of present-day Thurrock in Essex and the London Borough of Havering in Greater London.

== Schools ==
Chafford Hundred currently has four primary schools and one secondary school.

- Tudor Court Primary School
- Warren Primary School
- Harris Primary Academy Chafford Hundred
- Harris Primary Academy Mayflower
- Harris Academy Chafford Hundred (secondary, formerly Chafford Hundred Campus Business and Enterprise College)

== Geography ==
Chafford Hundred is a suburb of the town of Grays, in the borough of Thurrock in the county of Essex, England. It is one of several distinct areas which collectively make up the town, including the West Thurrock and Lakeside areas, South Stifford, Stifford Clays, Grays Town Centre, Blackshots and Little Thurrock. It is located one mile north-west of Grays Town Centre and 18 miles east of London. It is closely linked to Lakeside Shopping Centre, which sits adjacent to the development to the west and is connected to it by a skybridge from Chafford Hundred railway station. Chafford Hundred is part of the Grays Urban Area, which had a recorded population of 99,462 at the 2021 census.

Chafford Hundred was built on parts of the historical parishes of Stifford and West Thurrock, Mill Lane being the border of the two respective historical parishes. The development is located directly between the modern communities of North Stifford, which bounds it to the north at Arterial Road on the A13 and the Treacle Mine Roundabout, and South Stifford, which bounds it to the south at the northern edge of the Magnet Industrial Estate along Mill Lane, Palmerston Road, Warren Lane and Devonshire Road. The estate is bounded to central Grays in the east at Elizabeth Road and Hogg Lane and Stifford Clays to the north-east at the Treacle Mine Roundabout. The development's western border runs along the Chafford Hundred railway line, adjacent to Lakeside Shopping Centre and the modern community of West Thurrock.

The land is on very gentle slopes (ranging from 18 to 34m AOD) and the area also has included a number of park and recreational areas. The largest area is of special environmental and scientific interest, Chafford Gorges Nature Park; its management was taken over by Essex Wildlife Trust on 9 June 2005.

== Politics and governance ==
Chafford Hundred is in the parliamentary constituency of Thurrock. The local member of Parliament (MP) is Jen Craft of the Labour Party, who was first elected at the 2024 general election. As one of the more affluent areas in the constituency, Chafford Hundred was traditionally more supportive of the Conservative Party until the 2010s, when demographic changes in the area and its growing popularity with commuters led to a shift in favour of the Labour Party. The local authority is Thurrock Council which has held unitary authority status since 1998. As such, the council is responsible for all local government services in the area. Chafford Hundred also falls under the jurisdiction of Essex Police and the Essex County Fire and Rescue Service which are overseen by the elected Police, Fire and Crime Commissioner for Essex. Since 2016, the police, fire and crime commissioner has been Roger Hirst of the Conservative Party.

For the purposes of local elections to Thurrock Council, Chafford Hundred is divided between the two electoral wards of South Chafford and Chafford and North Stifford, with the latter also including the separate community of North Stifford. Both wards elect two councillors each who serve for a term of four years. In the early years of the development, Chafford Hundred was split between the wards of West Thurrock, Stifford, Grays Thurrock Town and Grays Thurrock North. As the development continued to grow into the 1990s, the Local Government Commission for England split off parts of these wards to form a new separate ward for Chafford Hundred in 1997, which elected two councillors. Continued population growth into the 2000s led the commission to reorganise Chafford Hundred and its neighbouring wards into the current wards of South Chafford and Chafford and North Stifford in 2004.

Since 2024, all four councillors for Chafford Hundred have been from the Labour Party. Labour mayor of Thurrock Sue Shinnick has represented South Chafford since the 2022 Thurrock Council election, having previously represented Ockendon. Former Conservative council leader Mark Coxshall represented Chafford and North Stifford from the 2015 Thurrock Council election until he lost his seat to the Labour Party at the 2023 Thurrock Council election. Gary Hague, another former Conservative leader of the council, also represented Chafford and North Stifford from the 2004 Thurrock Council election until his retirement in 2021.

== Demographics ==
Chafford Hundred was built with an intended population of 15,000 people. The area has seen large growth since its inception, with many City workers and young homeowners settling there in the late 1990s and early 2000s because of the relatively easy commute into Central London and the area's relatively affordable house prices. By 1996, the new development had become home to 1,173 people with a projected population of 5,083 by 2001. At the 2001 census, the development had a recorded population of 8,586 people, when also including the nearby village of North Stifford which is grouped with the area for demographic purposes. This grew to 15,455 in the 2011 census, with an increase to 15,699 in the 2021 census. The development became increasingly popular with commuters to London in the 2000s and 2010s, which was the main cause of very high and rapid population growth in Grays and the rest of Thurrock and a substantial rise of commuting into London from the borough through the 2000s. Grays railway station had to be expanded in the mid 2000s to accommodate for this influx.

In the 2011 census, 75.8% of the residents in South Chafford and 80.9% of the residents in Chafford and North Stifford were born in England. In both wards, the second largest group by birth were people born in Nigeria, who accounted for 4.9% of the population in South Chafford and 3.3% in Chafford and North Stifford. In the 2021 census, 65.8% of people in South Chafford were born in the United Kingdom, while in Chafford and North Stifford the same figure was 75.9%. In the same census, white was the largest recorded ethnic group in both wards, accounting for 57.8% and 67.4% of the ward populations respectively. Black was the second largest ethnic group, accounting for 20.3% and 17.1% of their populations, followed by Asian in third place, which accounted for 14.8% and 10% of their populations.

=== Religion ===
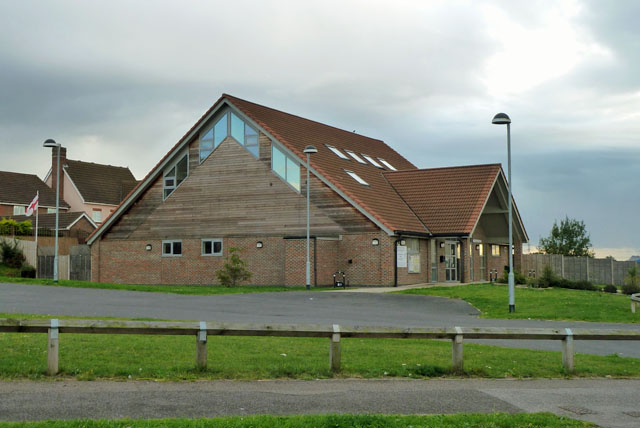
All Saints' Church in Drake Road, Chafford Hundred. It was opened in 2008 as the development's first church and is part of the Church of England's Grays Thurrock parish.

In the 2021 census, 55.4% of the residents in South Chafford identified as Christian and 29.8% of the population identified with no religion. A further 8.9% of residents identified as Muslim, 3.5% as Hindu, 1.5% as Sikh, 0.9% as Buddhist and 0.3% as Jewish. In the Chafford and North Stifford ward, 57.5% of residents identified as Christian, 30.7% as having no religion, 5.5% as Muslim, 2.7% as Sikh, 2.2% as Hindu, 0.6% as Jewish and 0.4% as Buddhist.

A church for Chafford Hundred had been planned from the first years of its construction. The development's first church, All Saint's Church, opened in Drake Road in 2008 at a cost of £1.3 million. The church is part of the Grays Thurrock parish of the Church of England and also doubles as a community centre, hosting youth groups, a stage school, child clinics, and a coffee shop. By 2009, a Church associated with the Rivers of Life group of evangelical churches had also opened in Drake Road.

=== Affluence and deprivation ===
Chafford Hundred is one of the more affluent areas of Thurrock. Richard Morrison of The Times described Chafford Hundred as the "epitome of middle-class Middle England" in 2004. In 2018, Thurrock Council reported that the two wards of South Chafford and Chafford and North Stifford were the first and second least economically deprived wards in Thurrock respectively. The levels of unemployment in both wards were also lower than the Thurrock average. The Index of Multiple Deprivation, which divides England into 32,482 areas and considers quality of life indicators to measure deprivation, placed most parts of Chafford Hundred in the least deprived areas of England in 2019 and 2015, and almost the entire development in the very least deprived decile in 2010.

Chafford Hundred was significantly impacted by the early 1990s housing slump. During this period, more than half the properties in the estate were repossessed, impacting house prices so significantly that prices fell by half. By the early 2000s, most of the residents in the area were young commuting homeowners who had moved in from the East End of London and other parts of Essex, with very few elderly residents. Young homeowners and commuters flocked to the area because it provided relatively affordable housing with good commuting links to Central London in an otherwise expensive and hard-to-afford London housing market, while also offering an opportunity to move up the property ladder, with the Evening Standard describing it as "the most coveted address in Britain" in 2001.

By the early 2020s, house prices in Chafford Hundred had risen substantially amid a local and national housing crisis, with house prices in the development estimated at an average of £408,003 as of 2024, which is higher than the regional average in the rest of Essex. The last homes in the development were completed and sold in 2020 at an ask price of £249,995. According to population estimates from 2022, the majority of homes in Chafford Hundred were owned by residents aged 58 to 76, with the total value of these 5,327 homes worth just over an estimated £2 billion.

=== Crime ===
Chafford Hundred, while less deprived overall than other areas of Thurrock and Essex, has traditionally had higher crime rates than places in the rest of the region proportionate to the estate's population. Essex Police crime statistics in 2018 and 2019 recorded the estate as having the third and second highest crime rates in Thurrock respectively, behind other parts of Grays. However, 2018 reports from Thurrock Council show that when divided into the two electoral wards of South Chafford and Chafford and North Stifford, both parts of the development on their own have a lower crime rate on average than Thurrock as a whole, with an average crime rate of 30.40 per 1,000 persons in South Chafford and 21.91 per 1,000 persons in Chafford and North Stifford, which is lower than Thurrock's average crime rate of 47.62.

The local newspaper Your Thurrock has attributed high crime rates in the Chafford Hundred development to high gang activity. A 2020 Thurrock Council report into gang violence in Thurrock found that organised gang activity in the borough had three main bases of activity; one of these bases of gang activity was Chafford Hundred, with one of Thurrock's three identified main organised gangs, C100 (Chafford 100), based in the area. Chafford Hundred Community Forum and local councillors have blamed a lack of youth facilities in the area for enabling youth crime and anti-social behaviour. Incidents of anti-social behaviour and gang crime have been a recurrent issue in the areas around Chafford Hundred railway station and Lakeside Shopping Centre in particular. However, the number of reported offences in these areas fell substantially after a crackdown on anti-social behaviour by Essex Police in 2024 with more patrols in these areas.

== Notable people ==
Singer Louisa Johnson is from Chafford Hundred and attended Harris Academy Chafford Hundred. Television personalities Chloe Brockett and Toby Aromolaran also come from the area, as does footballer Elliot Omozusi. Murder victims Craig Rolfe and Henry Nowak also came from the development. Chafford Hundred Athletic Club, a sports marketing club in Chafford Hundred, is managed by retired javelin thrower Fatima Whitbread, who founded it after her retirement in 1991. Notable members of the club have included Yvonne Murray, Tom McKean, Jonathan Edwards, Kelly Holmes, Linford Christie, Iwan Thomas and Steve Backley. Scottish entrepreneur Duncan Bannatyne also runs a health club in Howard Road, Chafford Hundred.
