= Grays Thurrock Chalk Pit =

Conservation area in Essex, England

Coordinates: 51.486°N 0.316°E

- Site of Special Scientific Interest
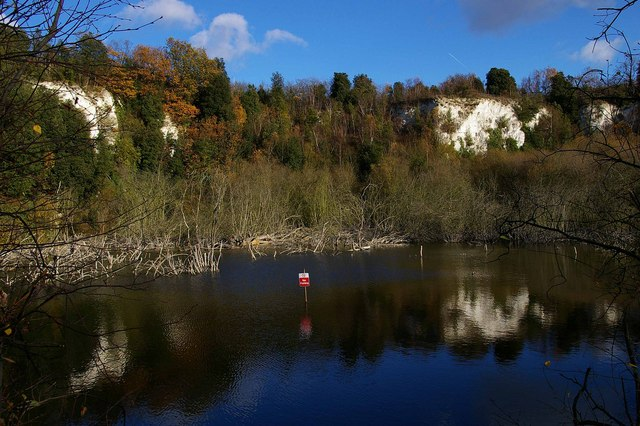
- Location of Grays Thurrock Chalk Pit.
- Area of search: Essex
- Grid reference: TQ609789
- Interest: Biological
- Area: 17.3 ha (43 acres)
- Notification date: 1985
- Location map: Magic Map

Grays Thurrock Chalk Pit is a 17.3-hectare (43-acre) Site of Special Scientific Interest in Grays in Essex. It is part of Chafford Gorges Nature Park, which is managed by the Essex Wildlife Trust.

Extraction of chalk finished in the 1920s, and since then colonisation of the site has created a range of woodland, grassland and scrub habitats which are important for invertebrates. There is also an area of open water. Beetles include two Red Book species, Mordellistena humeralis and Mordellistena neuwaldeggiana.

There is access to the site from Devonshire Road and Hogg Lane.
