= Linford, Essex =

Village in Essex, England

Coordinates: 51.4898°N 0.4074°E

Linford
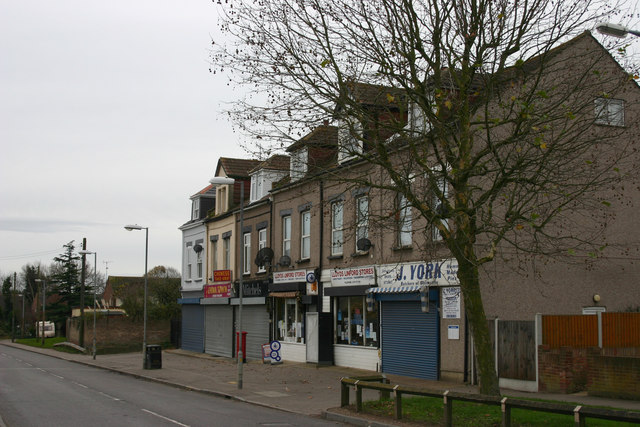
- Linford shopping parade in 2011

- Location within Essex
- Population: 1,700 (2021)
- OS grid reference: TQ675793
- Unitary authority: Thurrock
- Ceremonial county: Essex
- Region: East
- Country: England
- Sovereign state: United Kingdom
- Post town: STANFORD-LE-HOPE
- Postcode district: SS17
- Dialling code: 01375
- Police: Essex
- Fire: Essex
- Ambulance: East of England
- UK Parliament: South Basildon and East Thurrock

Linford, historically known as Muckingford, is a village in the borough of Thurrock in Essex, England. Located around 3 miles north-east from Tilbury Town, it is bordered directly by East Tilbury to its south and also faces Mucking in the north-east. It had a population of 1,700 at the 2021 census.

== History ==
Linford and the nearby settlement of Mucking form an archaeological site. Discoveries in 1960 suggest the existence of a human settlement in what is now Linford during the Romano-British period. There is also evidence of human settlements in Linford during the Bronze and Iron ages. Further discoveries between 1965 and 1978 suggest the existence of an Anglo-Saxon settlement in the area as early as c. 400, which would make the settlers among the very first Anglo-Saxons in England.

Historically, Linford was known as Muckingford until the mid-1800s. The then-hamlet is believed to have been named after the village of Mucking. It is said that the name was coined by the locals of Muckingford when it was once considered a part of the Mucking area in order to differentiate themselves from "Lower Mucking" and its residents, Muckingford being situated on higher terrain than Mucking. During this period, Muckingford is said to have experienced an influx of residents who had moved up from Mucking, which endangered Mucking as its population dwindled and almost died out.

In the mid-1800s, Muckingford was renamed Linford by industrialists who wanted to develop the hamlet into a town. However, attempts to develop Linford were abandoned in the early 1900s after the London, Tilbury and Southend Railway refused to give their support and build a new halt station at adjacent East Tilbury. While the development never came to fruition, the name Linford stuck into the present day.

In the 1920s, Linford was recorded as having a pub, a post office and some homes. A map from the same decade shows much of its modern amenities, including the George & Dragon pub, the Merryloots farm, the Methodist church, the local pumping station and the shopping parade, as well as schematics to expand the existing settlement with new Victorian and Edwardian housing. The plans to expand Linford were finally realised in the 1970s, when new homes were constructed by Essex County Council as part of a wider redevelopment of the Thurrock district. Linford remains a village in the present day. It had an approximate population of 1,700 at the 2021 census. (Note: Area profile approximation.)

== Politics and governance ==
Linford is in the parliamentary constituency of South Basildon and East Thurrock. The local member of Parliament (MP) is James McMurdock, an independent politician, who was first elected at the 2024 general election as a candidate for Reform UK. The local authority is Thurrock Council which has held unitary authority status since 1998. As such, the council is responsible for all local government services in the area. Linford also falls under the jurisdiction of Essex Police and the Essex County Fire and Rescue Service which are overseen by the elected Police, Fire and Crime Commissioner for Essex. Since 2016, the police, fire and crime commissioner has been Roger Hirst of the Conservative Party.

For the purposes of local elections to Thurrock Council, Linford is part of the electoral ward of East Tilbury. It forms the centre of the ward alongside the separate community of East Tilbury. The ward elects two members for a term of four years. It took on its current boundaries in 2004.
