= 2027 Brentwood Borough Council election =

2027 English local government election

- 6 May 2027

13 out of 39 seats to Brentwood Borough Council 20 seats needed for a majority
Leader	Barry Aspinell	Roger Hirst	Russell Quirk
Party	Liberal Democrats	Conservative	Reform
Leader's seat	Pilgrims Hatch	Ingatestone, Fryerning & Mountnessing	Hutton South
Last election	16 seats, 24.3%	12 seats, 25.2%	8 seats, 37.0%
Current seats	16	11	8
Leader	Gareth Barrett	Sheila Murphy
Party	Labour	Independent
Leader's seat	Brentwood South	Herongate, Ingrave & West Horndon
Last election	2 seats, 5.7%	1 seat, 0.7%
Current seats	2	2
Incumbent Leader
Barry Aspinell
Liberal Democrats
No overall control (Note: Liberal Democrats–Labour–Independent coalition.)

The 2027 Brentwood Borough Council election will be held on 6 May 2027 to elect members of Brentwood Borough Council in Essex, England. This will be on the same day as other local elections held across the United Kingdom.

== Background ==
=== Local government reorganisation ===
Due to proposed structural changes to local government in England, the 2026 election was intended to be the final election to the council before it was abolished and replaced by Mid Essex Council, a unitary authority. However, on 7 September 2026, the government announced it was withdrawing plans for the planned restructuring pending review. Following this announcement, local elections due to be held in 2027 under the existing local electoral calendar would proceed.

== Summary ==
=== Election result ===
2027 Brentwood Borough Council election
Party	This election				Full council			This election		
Party	Candidates	Seats	Net	Seats %	Other	Total	Total %	Votes	Votes %	+/−
Liberal Democrats					9					
Conservative					8					
Reform					7					
Labour					1					
Independent					1					

=== Incumbents ===
Ward	Incumbent councillor	Affiliation	Re-standing
Blackmore & Doddinghurst	Keith Parker	Conservative	
Brentwood North	Philip Mynott	Liberal Democrats	
Brentwood South	Tim Barrett	Labour	
Brentwood West	David Kendall	Liberal Democrats	
Brizes, Stondon Massey & South Weald	Will Russell	Conservative	
Herongate, Ingrave & West Horndon	Adrian Baldock (Note: Originally elected as a Conservative, but later left the party to sit as an independent.)	Independent	
Hutton East	Ben Rigby	Liberal Democrats	
Hutton North	Jan Pound	Conservative	
Hutton South	Russell Quirk	Reform	
Ingatestone, Fryerning & Mountnessing	Hugh Gorton	Liberal Democrats	
Pilgrims Hatch	Vicky Davies	Liberal Democrats	
Shenfield	Nicky Cuthbert	Liberal Democrats	
Warley	Mark Haigh	Liberal Democrats	
