= Treacle Mine Roundabout =

Roundabout in Essex, England

Coordinates: 51.49506°N 0.31770°E

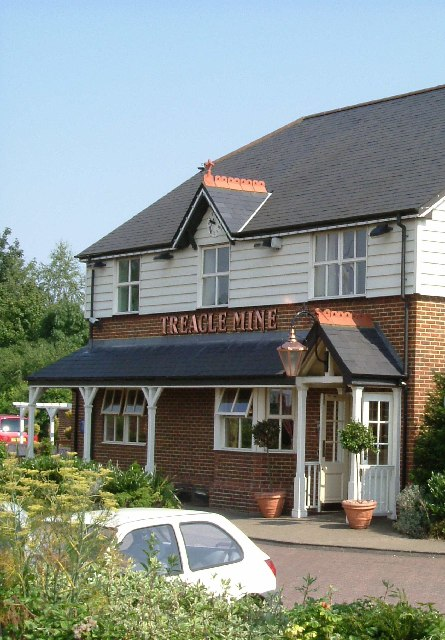
The public house the roundabout is named after.

Treacle Mine Roundabout is a suburban roundabout between Grays and Stifford Clays, Essex, England.

It is named, as is the adjacent public house for the legend of Treacle mines.

The roundabout was built to link the new A13 to its former route (the A1306) and Long Lane at the top of Hogg Lane: a spot that London Country bus timetables used to call Grays Corner. There was another Grays Corner elsewhere on the A13, so the name Treacle Mine was used informally to distinguish this older junction. This junction needed improving despite the long distance A13 traffic being bypassed because of the construction of Chafford Hundred, an Infill development on former quarries, industrial and farming land, and the consequent increase in commuting traffic.

== See also ==
List of road junctions in the United Kingdom
