= Chafford Hundred railway station =

Network Rail station in Essex, England

Chafford Hundred
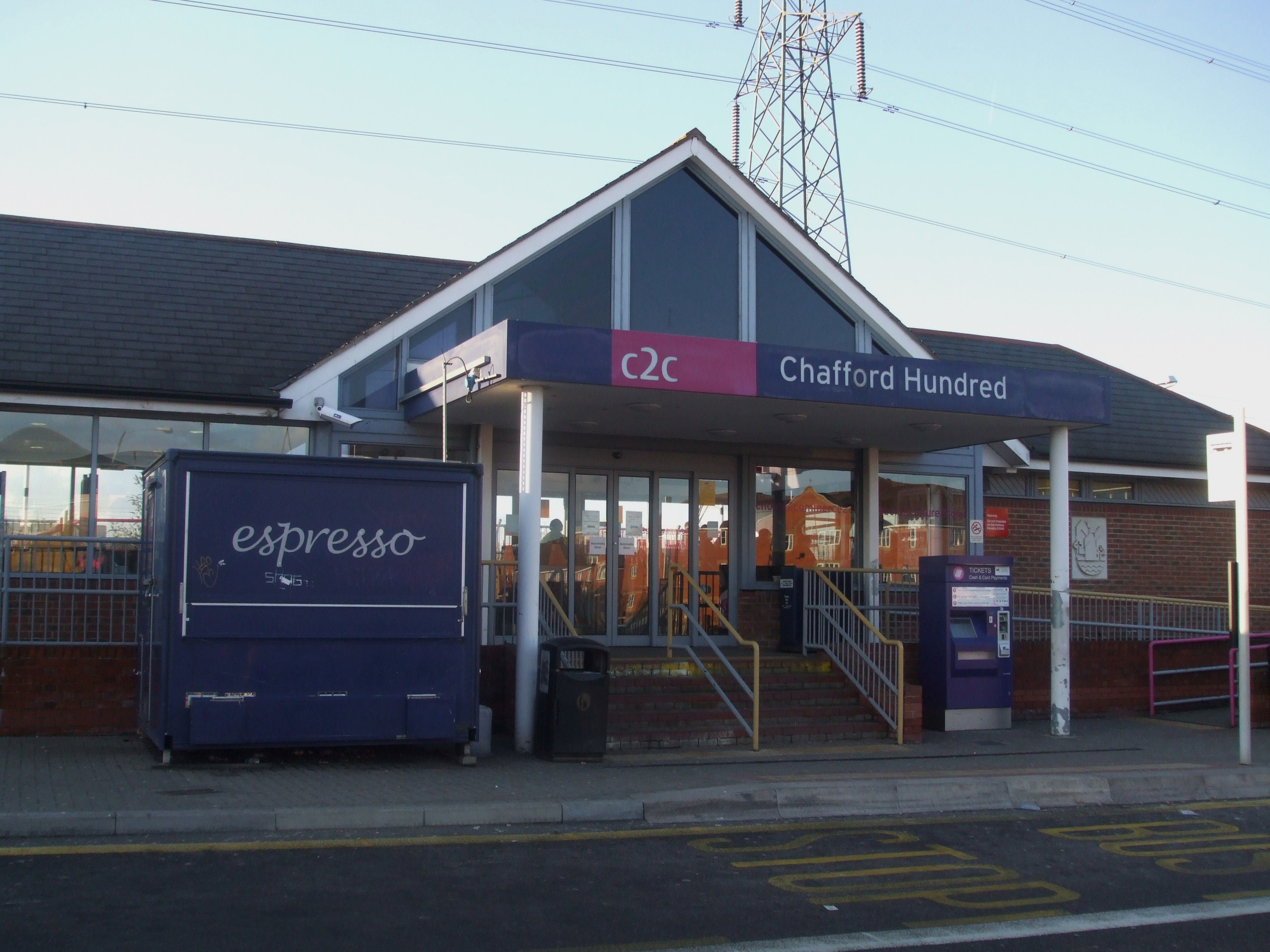
- Chafford Hundred railway station in 2010
- Interactive map of Chafford Hundred

General information
- Location: Chafford Hundred
- Local authority: Borough of Thurrock
- Grid reference: TQ589787
- Managed by: c2c
- Owner: Network Rail
- Station code: CFH
- DfT category: E
- Number of platforms: 1
- Accessible: Yes
- Fare zone: A

National Rail annual entry and exit
- 2020–21: ▼0.882 million
- 2021–22: ▲1.916 million
- 2022–23: ▲2.128 million
- 2023–24: ▲2.332 million
- 2024–25: ▼2.318 million

Railway companies
- Original company: British Rail

Key dates
- 30 May 1995: Opened as Chafford Hundred

Other information
- External links: Departures; Facilities
- Coordinates: 51.4859°N 0.2876°E

Chafford Hundred railway station, also known as Chafford Hundred Lakeside station, is located on a single-track branch line of the London, Tilbury and Southend line, serving the area of Chafford Hundred as well as Lakeside Shopping Centre in Essex. It is 20 miles 77 chains (33.7 km) down the line from London Fenchurch Street via Upminster; it is situated between Ockendon and Grays. Its three-letter station code is CFH.

The station has a single platform and was opened on 26 May 1995 by Fatima Whitbread for Railtrack. Today, all passenger train services are operated by c2c, which also manages the station. Although outside the London fare zones 1 to 6, the station became part of the Oyster card pay-as-you-go network in 2010. It is the busiest single-platform station in the UK.

== History ==
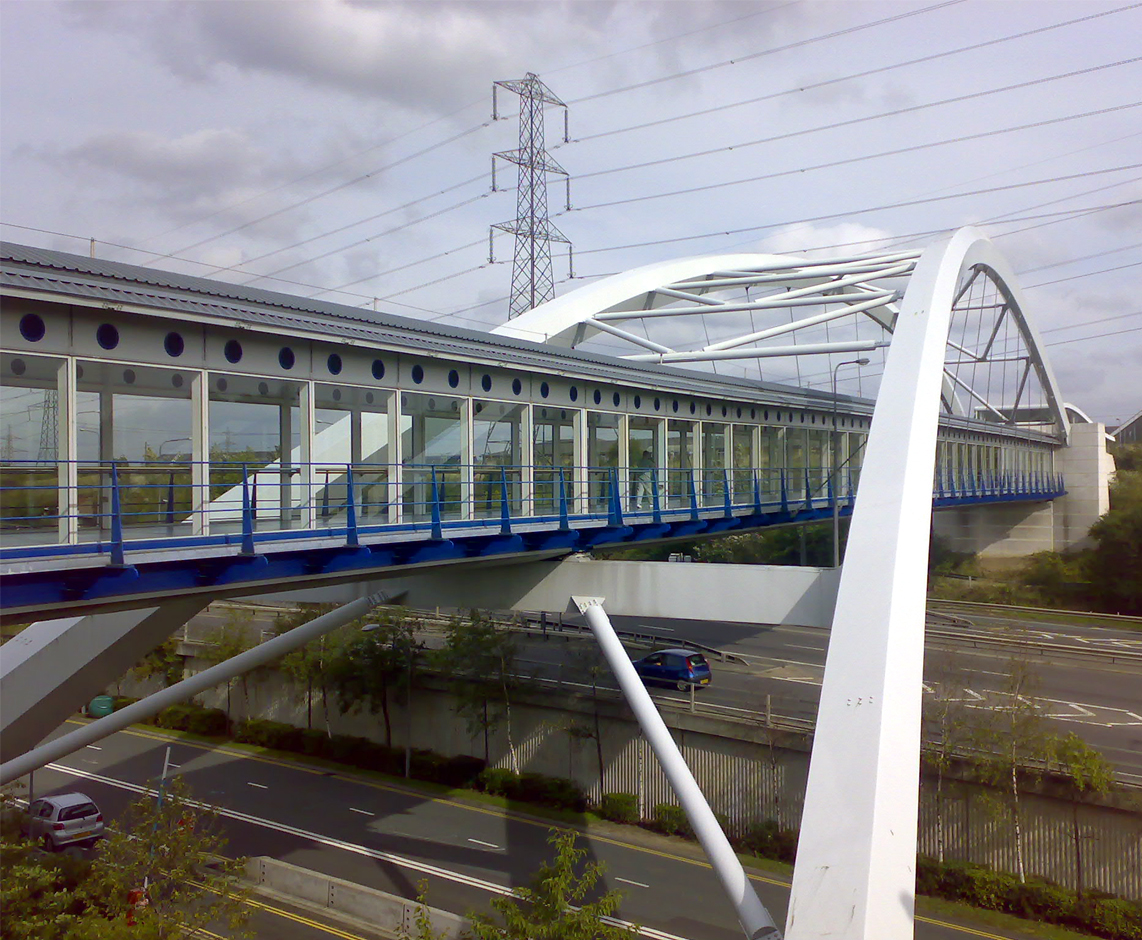
A footbridge links the station to the shopping centre

The single-track line through the area was opened in 1893 by the London, Tilbury and Southend Railway (LTSR) as part of a branch from Romford to Grays via Upminster. By the late 20th century service on the line had been reduced to a relatively infrequent shuttle between Upminster and Grays, calling at the only intermediate station at Ockendon.

Following the opening of Lakeside Shopping Centre in 1990 a new single-platform station was opened on 26 May 1995 by Fatima Whitbread for Railtrack. The £1 million station was funded by the Chafford Hundred development consortium. Initially a free shuttle bus connected the station to the shopping centre, with a direct pedestrian bridge link replacing the bus in 2000. The shuttle train service was eventually extended beyond Upminster to Fenchurch Street in London and beyond Grays to Southend Central in Southend-on-Sea, with service frequency increased to two trains an hour in each direction.

Usage is moderate for a suburban station and increasing; to expand capacity the buildings were rebuilt in 2006. The "Lakeside" suffix has occasionally been added to the name to not only reflect its location in the town of Chafford Hundred but also its proximity to the shopping centre. However, most sources including c2c and TfL, continue to simply call the station Chafford Hundred for sake of brevity.

The station became part of the Oyster card pay-as-you-go network in 2010.

The station celebrated its 30th anniversary in 2025, with Fatima Whitbread, Thurrock MP Jen Craft and local councillors attending a ceremony organised by c2c to mark the occasion.

== Services ==
As of the June 2024 timetable the typical Monday to Friday off-peak service is:

- 2 tph (trains per hour) westbound to London Fenchurch Street
- 2 tph eastbound to Southend Central

According to the ORR, the station is the busiest single-platform station in the UK, beating the next busiest (Windsor and Eton Central) by some 900,000 passengers per year.

== Connections ==
Ensignbus routes 33 and X80 serve the station.

Preceding station	National Rail	Following station
Ockendon	c2c London, Tilbury and Southend line	Grays
