= Nick Alston =

British former Conservative Essex Police and Crime Commissioner

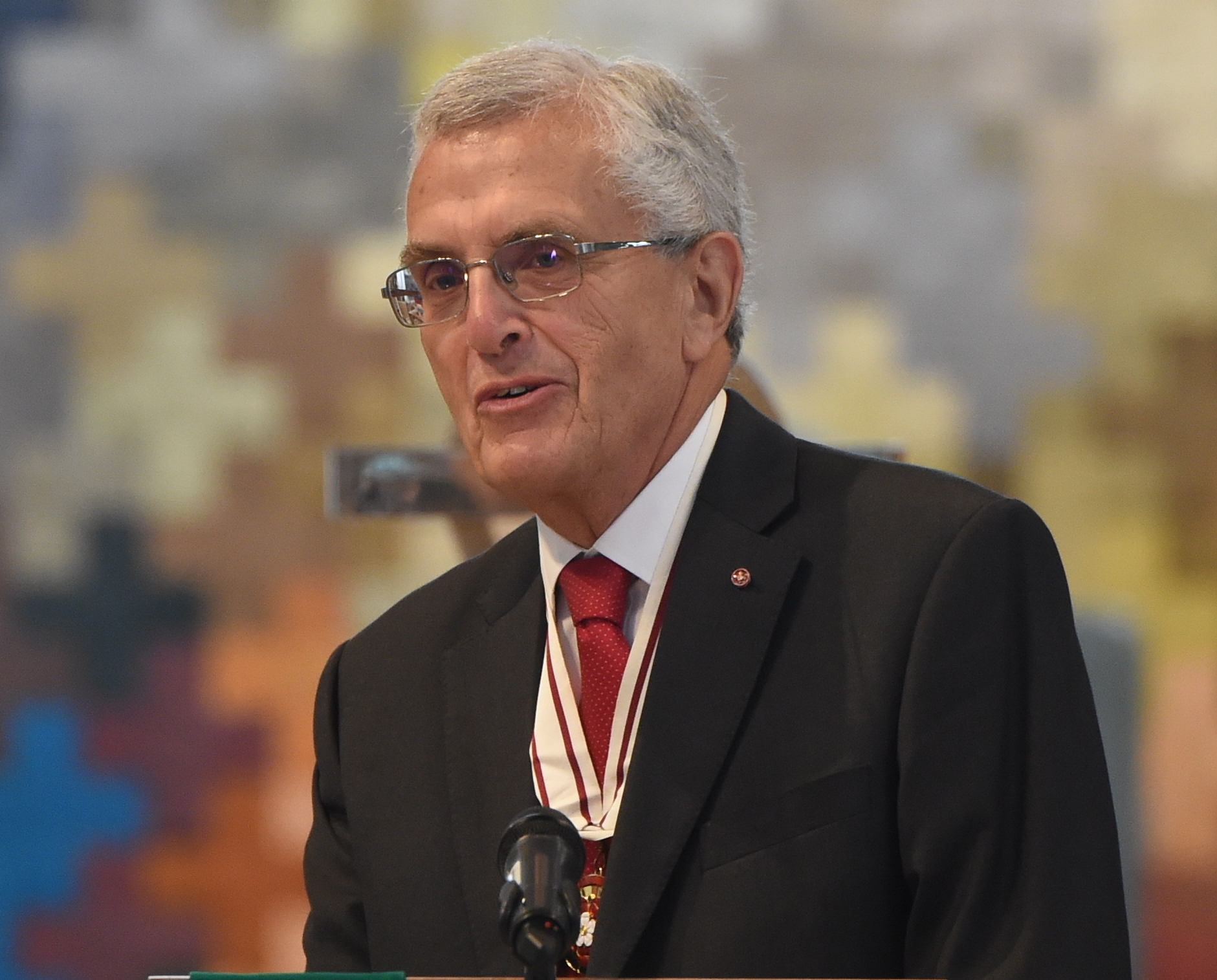
- Alston in 2024

Essex Police and Crime Commissioner
- In office 22 November 2012 – 11 May 2016
- Preceded by: Position established
- Succeeded by: Roger Hirst

Personal details
- Born: Nicholas Kenneth Alston; 2 September 1952 (age 73) Harwich, Essex, England
- Party: Conservative
- Spouse: Philippa Rust (m. 1974)
- Children: 2
- Parent(s): Kenneth F. Alston; Florence B.Cowling/Alston

Nicholas Kenneth Alston CBE DL (born 2 September 1952) is a British former Conservative Essex Police and Crime Commissioner.

Alston was the first person to hold the post and was elected on 15 November 2012. The turn-out in Essex for the 2012 PCC election was 12.8%.

== Biography ==
Alston was born on 2 September 1952 in Harwich. His father, Kenneth Alston, served in the Police Force for 37 years eventually rising to the rank of Deputy Chief Constable of Essex Police before retiring in 1971. Nick Alston attended King Edward VI Grammar School in Chelmsford, before going up to Queens' College, Cambridge, to read Natural Sciences in the same year as his father retired.

Alston was commissioned as an officer in the Royal Navy and then served for 30 years in the Civil Service. He was appointed Commander of the Order of the British Empire (CBE) in the 1997 New Year Honours, at which time he was an assistant secretary with the Ministry of Defence. He was appointed a Deputy Lieutenant of Essex in 2017.

In June 2016 appointed as the first Chair of the Policing Institute for the Eastern Region at Anglia Ruskin University based in Chelmsford, Essex and in December 2016 he was appointed as a non-executive Director of the UK's National Crime Agency.

In November 2017 appointed as interim chair of the Mid Essex Hospital Services (NHS) Trust. It was announced in September 2018 that he would become Chair of the Essex Community Foundation.

Alston was High Sheriff of Essex in 2022.
