= Lion Pit =

Protected area in Essex, England

Coordinates: 51.4806°N 0.301°E

- Site of Special Scientific Interest
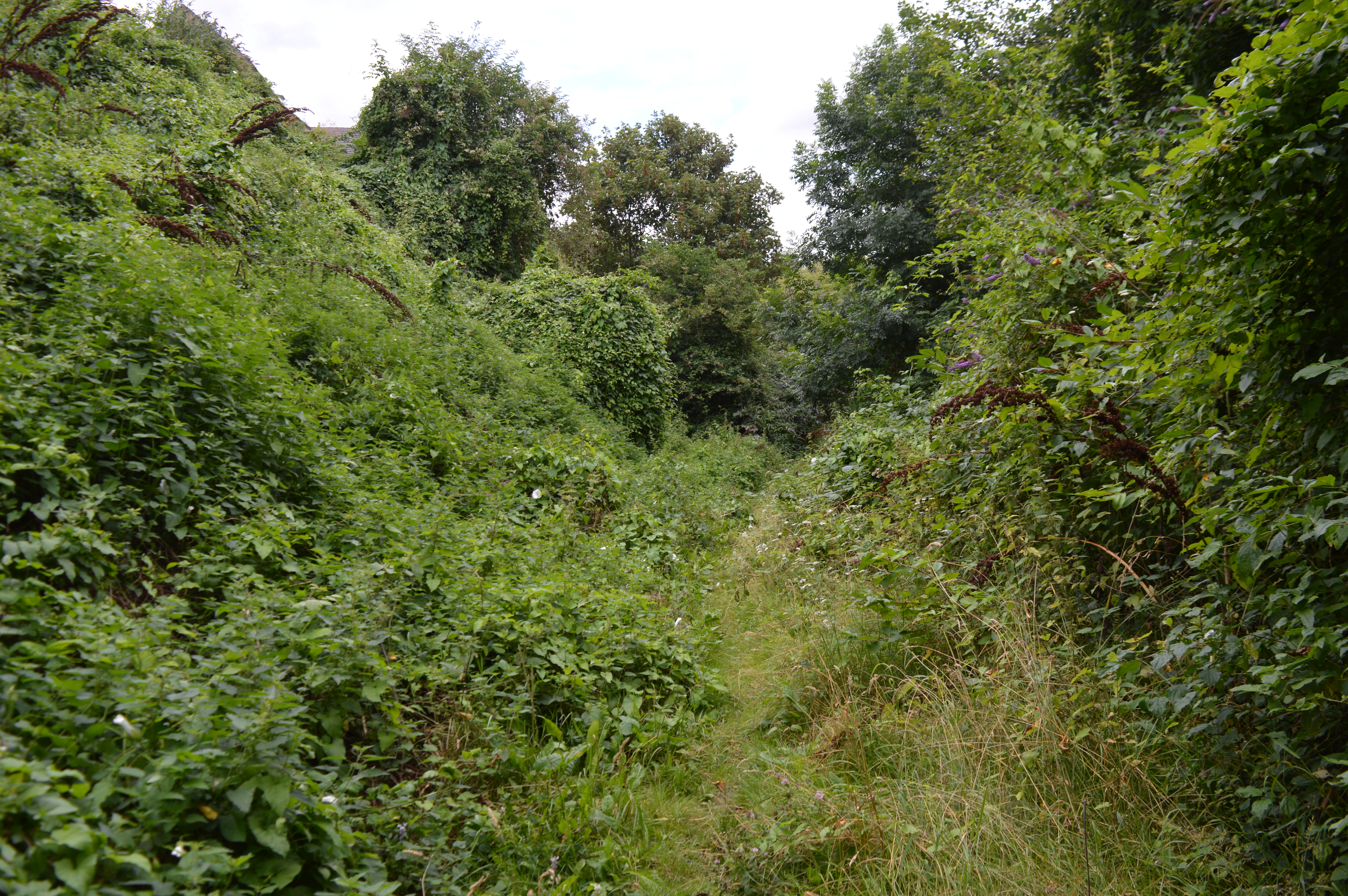
- Location of Lion Pit.
- Area of search: Essex
- Grid reference: TQ 598781
- Interest: Geological
- Area: 2.5 ha (6.2 acres)
- Notification date: 1986
- Location map: Magic Map

Lion Pit is a 2.5-hectare (6.2-acre) geological Site of Special Scientific Interest in Grays in Essex. It is a Geological Conservation Review site, and part of the Chafford Gorges Nature Park, which is managed by the Essex Wildlife Trust.

The site is part of a nineteenth-century tramway cutting to carry chalk to riverside wharves. Evidence has been found of flint-knapping using the Levallois technique by Neanderthals 200,000 years ago, and it has even been possible to fit back together some of the flint flakes. Fossils have been found of mammals including, rhinoceros, bison, mammoth and straight-tusked elephant.

A public footpath goes through the site from Weymouth Drive to London Road.
