= Chafford Gorges Nature Park =

Nature reserve in Essex, England

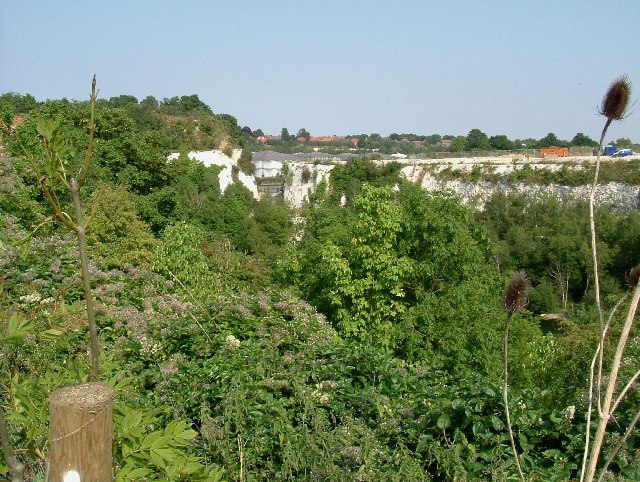
- Chafford Gorge

- Location within Greater London
- Location: Chafford Hundred, England
- Coordinates: 51.4892°N 0.3°E
- Area: 200 acres (81 ha)
- Website: www.essexwt.org.uk/reserves/chafford-gorges

The Chafford Gorges Nature Park is a 200-acre (81 ha) nature reserve located in Chafford Hundred, England, and managed by the Essex Wildlife Trust. It includes two Sites of Special Scientific Interest. Grays Thurrock Chalk Pit has been designated for its biological interest, and Lion Pit for geological interest.

== Facilities ==
There was a visitors' centre for the nature park on Drake Road. It had a gift shop which sold refreshments and there were toilets and an observation deck. However, it has now closed.

== History ==
The reserve is on the site of three major chalk quarries – Warren Gorge, Lion Gorge, and Grays Gorge which were worked from the end of the 18th century for around 150 years.

=== Lion Pit ===
In the Lion Gorge are the remnants of an old tramway cutting created in the nineteenth century to transport chalk from Lion Pit to the riverside wharves. The tramway ran roughly south from the chalk diggings to the Lion Works – a Portland cement factory opened in 1874. (Until about 1980, Thurrock was a major centre for cement production.) Part of the course of the tramway can be seen under the bridge where the railway line crosses a path from The Chase to Hedley Avenue and is also visible on London Road between The Chase and Foxton Road.

== Wildlife ==
Animal life includes the brown long-eared bat, the pipistrelle bat and the great crested newt. Among the birds are kingfishers, woodpeckers, sand martins, reed and Cetti's warblers and house martins. In winter, the gorges are visited by birds such as siskin, redpoll and pochard. There are a number of lakes and fish species present include tench, rudd, pike and bream. Plant life includes the common spotted orchid, bee orchid and bird's-nest orchid. Trees include beech, oak, ash and sycamore.

== Geology ==
The nature park has been described as the finest area for geology in south Essex. Fossils show that the area was once a tropical sea. There is a "geological trail" and a guide is available which describes the development of the chalk deposits over the course of 85 million years.

== Gallery ==
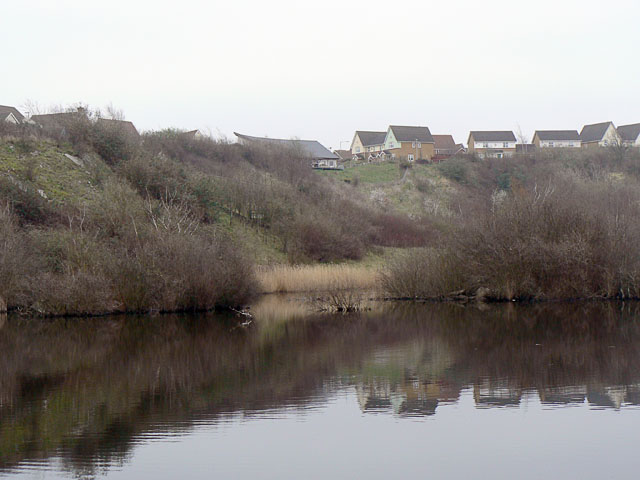
Looking up at the visitor's centre from the gorge (John Rostron)

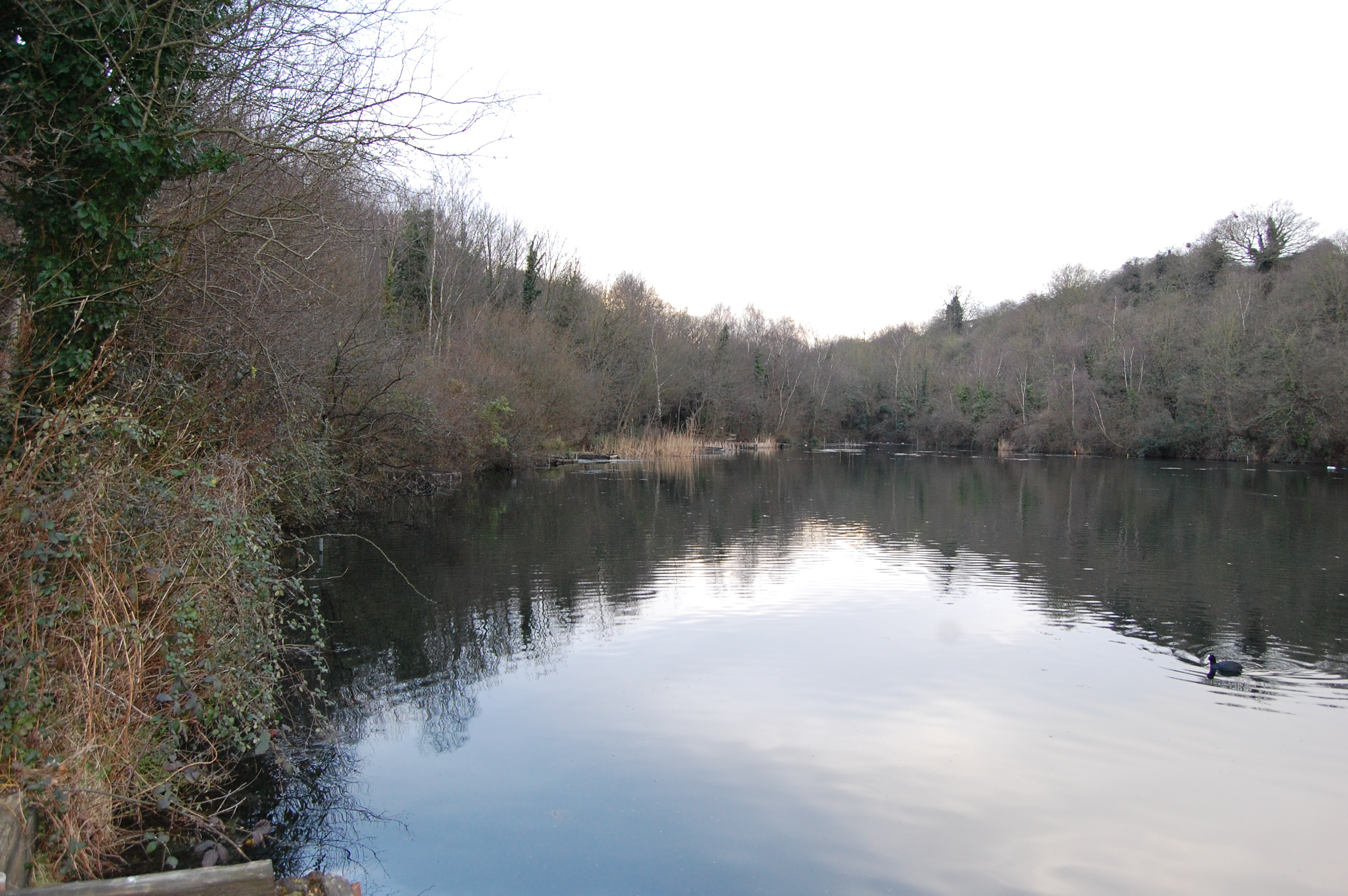
The lake in Lion Gorge, looking south

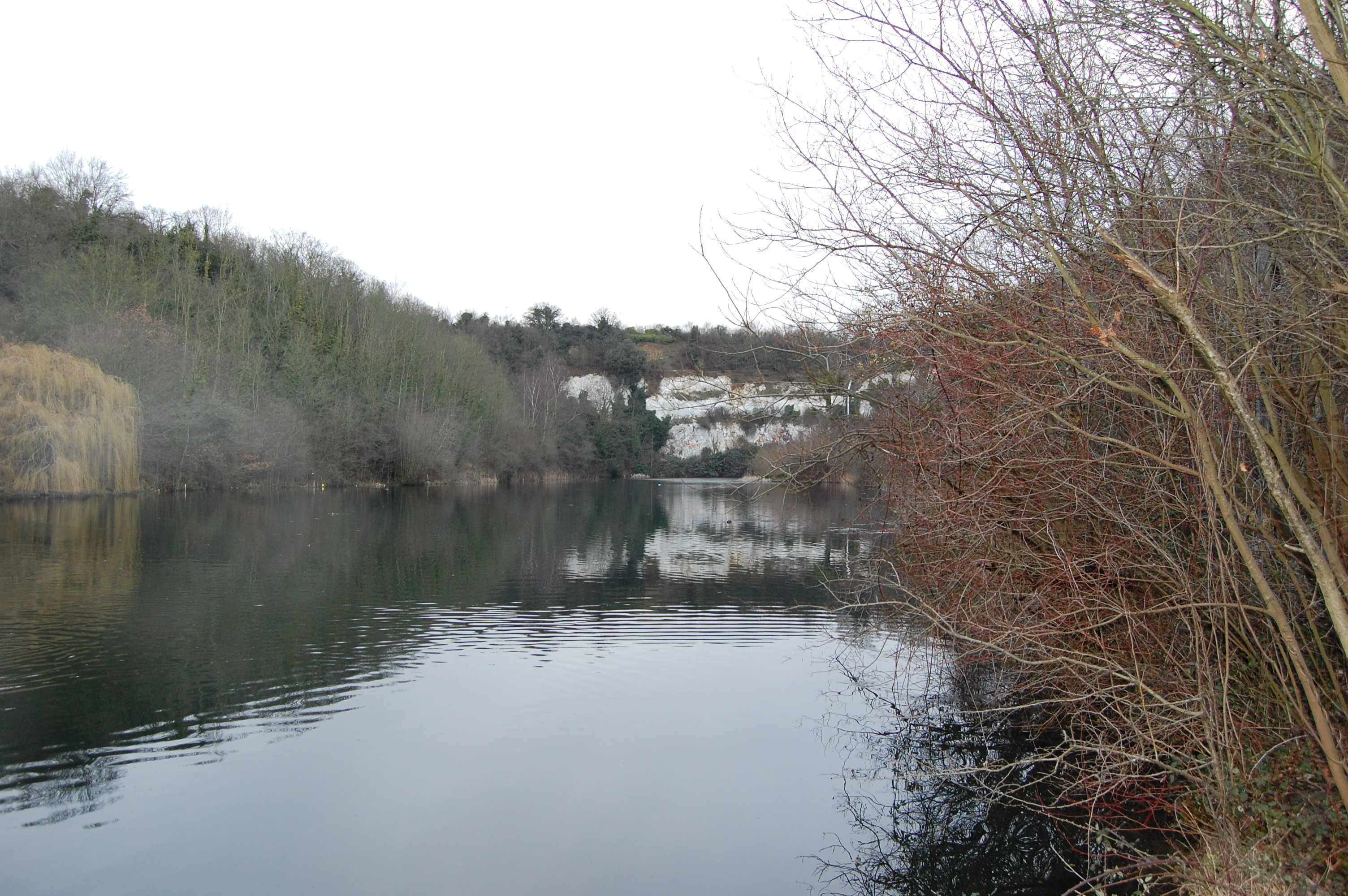
The lake in Lion Gorge, looking north

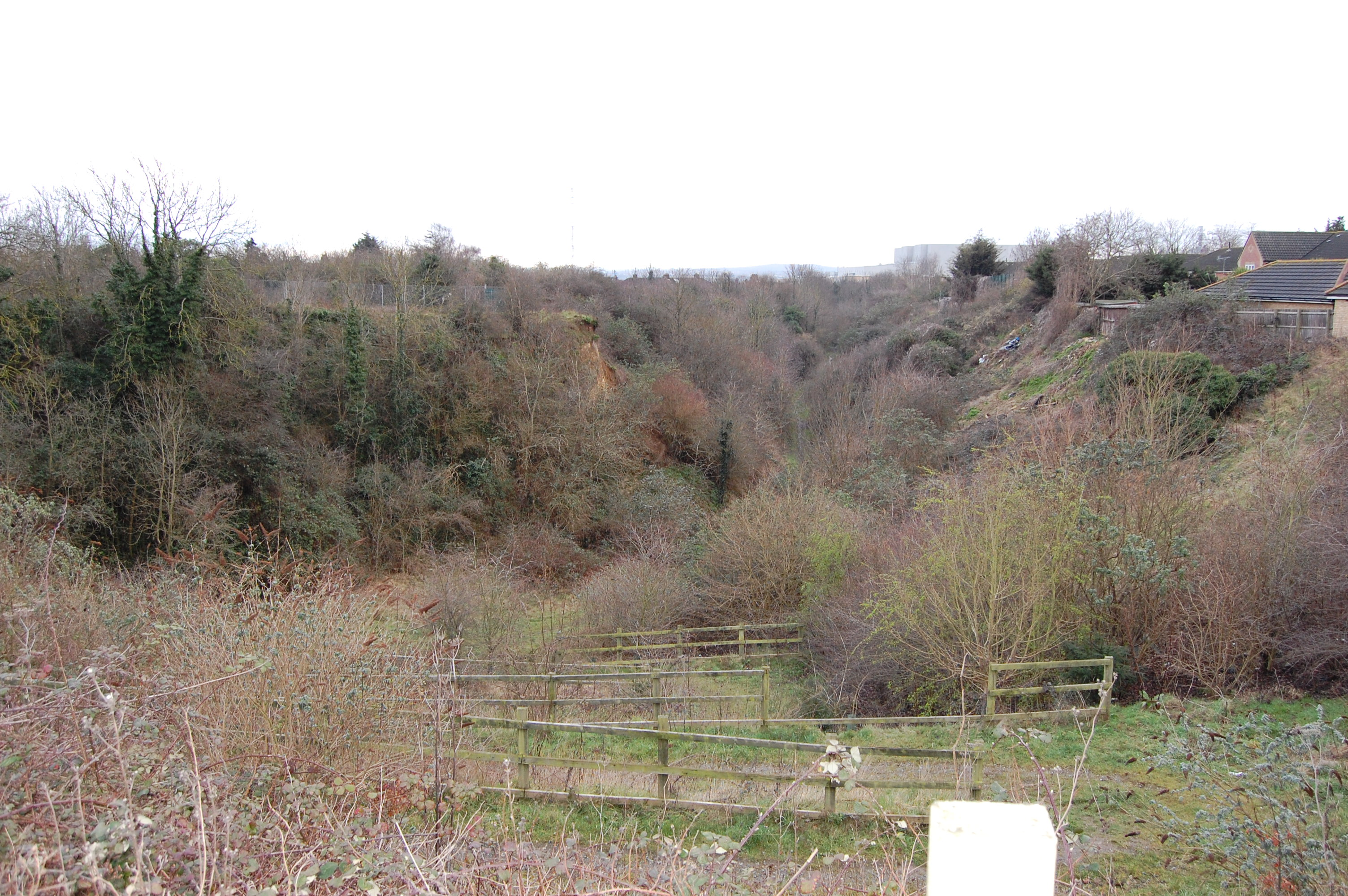
Lion Pit SSSI, looking south
