= 1997 Thurrock Council election =

English local election

- 1 May 1997

All 49 seats to Thurrock Council 25 seats needed for a majority
	First party	Second party
Leader	Andy Smith	Ray Andrews
Party	Labour	Conservative
Leader's seat	Tilbury St. Chads (Note: New seat. Previously represented a seat in Stifford ward.)	Orsett
Last election	38 seats	1 seat
Seats won	46	3
Seat change	▲8	▲2
Popular vote	84,701	36,084
Percentage	68.7%	29.3%
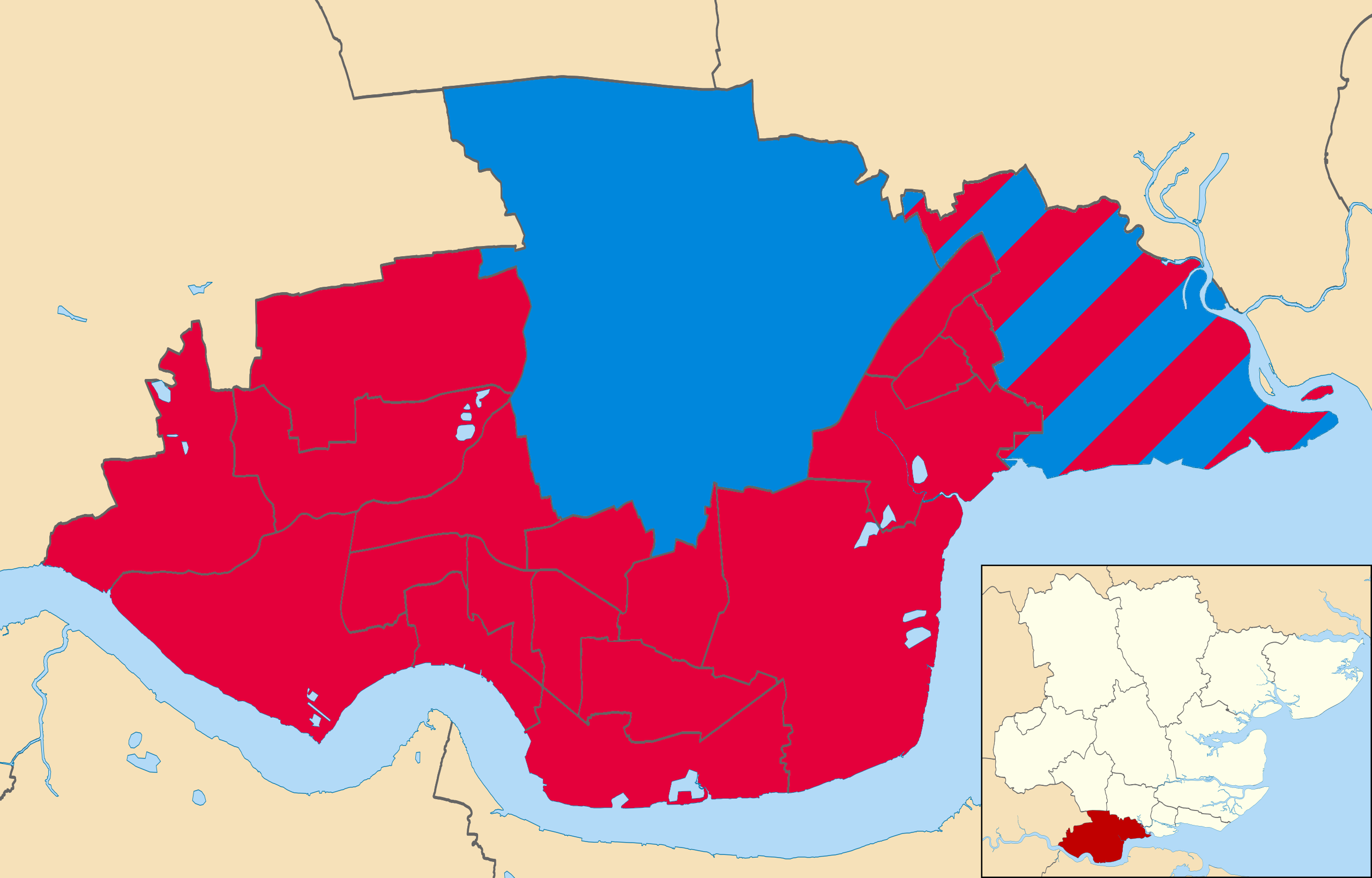
- Results by ward and party colour. Wards where two different parties won a seat are striped in their respective colours.
Leader before election
Andy Smith
Labour
Leader after election
Andy Smith
Labour

The 1997 Thurrock Council election took place on 1 May 1997 to elect the members of Thurrock Council in Essex, England. It took place on the same day as the 1997 general election and other local elections across England.

== Election ==
=== Background ===
At the previous borough council election in May 1996, one third (13) of the council's 39 seats were up for contention. The Labour administration led by Andy Smith gained 4 seats, increasing its total share of seats on the council to 38. Two independent councillors lost their seats, as did the Conservative opposition led by Ray Andrews, leaving them with one seat on the council following the election.

From April to September 1996, the Local Government Commission for England reviewed Thurrock's electoral arrangements. The commission recommended that the borough council continue to be elected in thirds, but also recommended that the number of seats on the council increase from 39 to 49, that the number of wards on the council increase from 15 to 20, and that 10 of the existing wards have their boundaries redrawn. This followed the commission's recommendation in 1994 that Thurrock become a unitary authority. The council's leader Andy Smith supported the recommendations. The government issued statutory instruments implementing the commission's recommendations in July 1996 and February 1997.

As per government orders, Essex County Council electoral districts in Thurrock would not be contested in the 1997 Essex County Council election, with county councillors from Thurrock continuing to serve until 1 April 1998, when their seats would be abolished and the Thurrock unitary authority established. An all-out election for the unitary authority was scheduled for May 1997 on the same day as other local elections in England, with all 49 seats up for contention. Incumbent borough councillors would retire after this election unless re-elected to the unitary authority. Unitary authority councillors would serve on the borough council until the unitary authority's legal formation (Note: The unitary authority operated as a shadow council in the period between the election and its legal establishment in April 1998, meaning it operated as an entity but had no legal recognition or powers until that date.) in April 1998.

==== Ward changes ====
The wards of Belhus, Corringham and Fobbing, Ockendon, Stifford and West Thurrock had their boundaries redrawn, with the number of seats in West Thurrock increasing from 2 to 3 while the number of seats in Corringham and Fobbing fell from 3 to 2. Aveley, Chadwell St. Mary, Orsett, East Tilbury and The Homesteads did not undergo boundary changes, though the number of seats in East Tilbury did increase from 1 to 2. The ward of Tilbury was split into Tilbury St. Chads and Tilbury Riverside, Standford-le-Hope was split into Stanford-le-Hope West and Standford-le-Hope East, and Little Thurrock was split into Little Thurrock Blackshots and Little Thurrock Rectory. Grays Thurrock Town and Grays Thurrock North were abolished and replaced by Grays Thurrock and Grays Riverside. The new ward of Corringham West was split from Corringham and Fobbing, while the new ward of Chafford Hundred was formed from parts of West Thurrock, Stifford, Grays Thurrock North and Grays Thurrock Town.

=== Results summary ===
Thurrock local election result 1997
Party	Seats	Gains	Losses	Net gain/loss	Seats %	Votes %	Votes	+/−
Labour	46	0	0	0	93.9	68.7	84,701	
Conservative	3	0	0	0	6.1	29.3	36,084	
Ind. Conservative	0	0	0	0	0.0	0.8	943	
Ind. Residents	0	0	0	0	0.0	0.5	631	
Liberal Democrats	0	0	0	0	0.0	0.4	513	
Independent	0	0	0	0	0.0	0.3	375	

The election took place on 1 May 1997, on the same day as other local elections across England, as well as the 1997 general election. The Labour Party led by Andy Smith won 46 seats on the new council with an overall vote share of 68.7%, while the Conservative Party led by Ray Andrews won 3 seats with an overall vote share of 29.3%. The Liberal Democrats fielded one candidate, Stephen Martine in the Stanford-le-Hope West ward, and did not win any seats with an overall vote share of 0.4%. Two candidates, John and June Everett in the Chafford Hundred ward, stood as Independent Conservative candidates and secured an overall vote share of 0.8%. There was one independent candidate, Marie Bamford-Burst, who stood in Tilbury Riverside and secured an overall vote share of 0.3%. James Calder in the Grays Riverside ward also stood as an Independent Residents Association candidate, securing 0.5% of the overall vote share in the borough.

The Labour administration remained in power following the election. Andy Smith and Ray Andrews remained Leader of the Council and Leader of the Opposition respectively after the council became a unitary authority. This was the first and only election since Thurrock Council became a unitary authority where all seats were contested. From the next council election in 1999, seats were contested in thirds every three in four years. From 2025, the council will revert to an all-out electoral system with all seats up for contention in the 2025 council election and beyond.

== Ward results ==
=== Aveley ===
Aveley (3 seats) (Note: This ward did not have its boundaries redrawn and had the same number of seats as in previous elections.)
Party	Candidate	Votes	%	±%
Labour	Kenneth Arthur Evans	2,313	31.1	
Labour	Arthur Alfred Clarke	1,964	26.4	
Labour	Graham Timms	1,870	25.1	
Conservative	Yvonne Partridge	1,298	17.4	
Labour hold				
Labour hold				
Labour hold				

=== Belhus ===
Belhus (3 seats) (Note: This ward had its boundaries redrawn but still had the same number of seats as in previous elections.)
Party	Candidate	Votes	%	±%
Labour	Margaret Sarah Jones	2,313	31.8	
Labour	Peter John Maynard	2,116	29	
Labour Co-op	David Richard Hooper	1,666	22.9	
Conservative	Nikki Glenn Lewis	1,190	16.3	
Labour hold				
Labour hold				
Labour Co-op hold				

=== Chadwell St. Mary ===
Chadwell St. Mary (3 seats)
Party	Candidate	Votes	%	±%
Labour	Patrick Rice	3,236		
Labour	Gordon Leonard Barton	3,086		
Labour	Anthony William Fish	2,976		
Conservative	Kazimierz Rytter	1,000		
Labour hold				
Labour hold				
Labour hold				

=== Chafford Hundred ===
Chafford Hundred (2 seats) (Note: New ward.)
Party	Candidate	Votes	%	±%
Labour	Peter Martin O'Kane	674		
Labour Co-op	Pauline Elizabeth Anne De'Ath	601		
Conservative	Geoffrey Charles Jackson	551		
Conservative	Ron George Jameson	499		
Ind. Conservative	John Francis Everett	482		
Ind. Conservative	June Bette Everett	461		
Labour win (new seat)				
Labour Co-op win (new seat)				

=== Corringham & Fobbing ===
Corringham and Fobbing (2 seats) (Note: This ward had its boundaries redrawn and its seats reduced from three seats to two.)
Party	Candidate	Votes	%	±%
Labour	Clinton Arthur Sear	1,619		
Conservative	Richard Audubon Bingley	1,486		
Labour	Trevor Herburt Fitzjohn	1,373		
Conservative	Jacqueline Plom	1,051		
Labour hold				
Conservative gain from Labour				

=== Corringham West ===
Corringham West (2 seats)
Party	Candidate	Votes	%	±%
Labour	William Archibald	1,716		
Labour	Nigel John Barron	1,544		
Conservative	Daphne Hart	920		
Conservative	Sean John Joseph Reilly	611		
Labour win (new seat)				
Labour win (new seat)				

=== East Tilbury ===
East Tilbury (2 seats) (Note: This ward did not have its boundaries redrawn but had its seats increased from one seat to two.)
Party	Candidate	Votes	%	±%
Labour	Barry John Palmer	Uncontested	N/A	N/A
Labour	Gerard William Rice	Uncontested	N/A	N/A
Labour hold				
Labour win (new seat)				

=== Grays Riverside ===
Grays Riverside (3 seats)
Party	Candidate	Votes	%	±%
Labour	Carl Anthony Graham Morris	2,041		
Labour	Geoffrey Bernard Slocock	1,757		
Labour Co-op	John George Kent	1,577		
Conservative	James Edward Carter	1,102		
Conservative	Emma Sarah Wood	1,042		
Ind. Residents	James Gerard Calder	631		
Labour win (new seat)				
Labour win (new seat)				
Labour Co-op win (new seat)				

=== Grays Thurrock ===
Grays Thurrock (3 seats)
Party	Candidate	Votes	%	±%
Labour Co-op	Sidney John Josling	2,289		
Labour	Timothy John McMahon	2,205		
Labour	Yash Pall Gupta	2,193		
Conservative	Deborah Ann Cole	1,353		
Conservative	Lloyd Peter Brown	1,212		
Labour Co-op win (new seat)				
Labour win (new seat)				
Labour win (new seat)				

=== Little Thurrock Blackshots ===
Little Thurrock Blackshots (2 seats)
Party	Candidate	Votes	%	±%
Labour	Alan Douglas Warren	1,331		
Labour	Roy Graham Barrett	1,319		
Conservative	Douglas John Sutton	1,259		
Conservative	Clive Herbert Broad	1,174		
Labour win (new seat)				
Labour win (new seat)				

=== Little Thurrock Rectory ===
Little Thurrock Rectory (2 seats)
Party	Candidate	Votes	%	±%
Labour	Arthur Alfred William Bennett	2,029		
Labour Co-op	David John Gooding	1,562		
Conservative	James Edward Wright Lehrie	1,201		
Conservative	David Luke Potter	990		
Labour win (new seat)				
Labour Co-op win (new seat)				

=== Ockendon ===
Ockendon (3 seats)
Party	Candidate	Votes	%	±%
Labour	Barrie David Lawrence	2,368		
Labour Co-op	Pearl Betts	2,040		
Labour	Merlyn Barnes Jones	1,994		
Conservative	John Pierre Rollinson	1,153		
Labour hold				
Labour Co-op hold				
Labour hold				

=== Orsett ===
Orsett (2 seats)
Party	Candidate	Votes	%	±%
Conservative	Raymond George Andrews	1,808		
Conservative	Diane Lilian Revell	1,490		
Labour	Joe Aeron Chapman	1,071		
Labour	Allan Leonard McPherson	1,012		
Conservative hold				
Conservative gain from Labour				

=== Stanford-le-Hope East ===
Stanford-le-Hope East (2 seats)
Party	Candidate	Votes	%	±%
Labour	Maurice Bertram Meen	1,825		
Labour	Julian Martin Norris	1,728		
Conservative	Anne Cheale	1,023		
Conservative	Michael John Revell	662		
Labour win (new seat)				
Labour win (new seat)				

=== Stanford-le-Hope West ===
Stanford-le-Hope West (2 seats)
Party	Candidate	Votes	%	±%
Labour	Alphonse Marie Nuss	1,181		
Labour	Roger Moore	996		
Conservative	Anita Jane Bailey	951		
Conservative	Rita Elizabeth Bailey	819		
Liberal Democrats	Stephen George Martine	513		
Labour win (new seat)				
Labour win (new seat)				

=== Stifford ===
Stifford (3 seats)
Party	Candidate	Votes	%	±%
Labour	John Davis	2,385		
Labour	Peggy Bessie Giles	2,305		
Labour	Carol Ann Smith	2,299		
Conservative	Pauline Kathleen Campbell	1,676		
Conservative	Edward James Attewell	1,472		
Conservative	Robert Frederick Barnes	1,470		
Labour hold				
Labour hold				
Labour hold				

=== The Homesteads ===
The Homesteads (3 seats)
Party	Candidate	Votes	%	±%
Labour	Irene Archibald	2,367		
Labour	Lee Francis Gillam	2,321		
Labour	Margaret Anne Kirkwood	1,912		
Conservative	Alan Robert Bailey	1,682		
Conservative	Mark Levey	1,472		
Conservative	Robert Frederick Barnes	1,327		
Labour hold				
Labour hold				
Labour hold				

=== Tilbury Riverside ===
Tilbury Riverside (2 seats)
Party	Candidate	Votes	%	±%
Labour	John Stanley Garner	1,822		
Labour	Malcolm Frederick Southam	1,403		
Independent	Marie Bernadette Bamford-Burst	375		
Labour win (new seat)				
Labour win (new seat)				

=== Tilbury St. Chads ===
Tilbury St. Chads (2 seats)
Party	Candidate	Votes	%	±%
Labour	Sonya Kay Diss	Uncontested		
Labour	Andrew John Smith	Uncontested		
Labour win (new seat)				
Labour win (new seat)				

=== West Thurrock ===
West Thurrock (3 seats) (Note: This ward had its boundaries redrawn and its seats increased from two seats to three.)
Party	Candidate	Votes	%	±%
Labour	Reginald Dennis Lee	2,367		
Labour	Robert John Williams	2,038		
Labour	Leslie John Groombridge	1,897		
Conservative	Henry Hesketh John Coe-Welch	1,140		
Labour hold				
Labour hold				
Labour win (new seat)				
