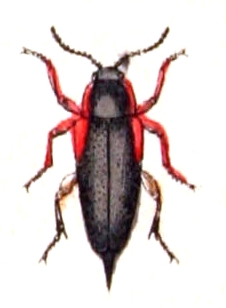

Scientific classification
- Kingdom: Animalia
- Phylum: Arthropoda
- Class: Insecta
- Order: Coleoptera
- Suborder: Polyphaga
- Infraorder: Cucujiformia
- Family: Mordellidae
- Subfamily: Mordellinae
- Tribe: Mordellistenini
- Genus: Mordellistena
- Species: M. humeralis

Binomial name
- Mordellistena humeralis Linnaeus, 1758

Synonyms
- Mordella humeralis Linnaeus, 1758; Mordellistena axillaris (Gyllenhal, 1810); Mordellistena flavescens (Marsham, 1802); Mordellistena nigricornis Schilsky, 1895

= Mordellistena humeralis =

Species of beetle

Mordellistena humeralis on a leaf

Mordellistena humeralis is a species of beetle in the genus Mordellistena of the family Mordellidae, in the superfamily Tenebrionoidea. It was described in 1758 by Carl Linnaeus.
