= John Clay (Yorkist soldier) =

Sir John Clay was an English soldier who fought in the Wars of the Roses on the Yorkist side in the Battle of Tewkesbury, which occurred on 4 May 1471. King Edward IV of England knighted him after the battle, with Clay's coat of arms depicting three lions facing another and engaging in a quarrel.
