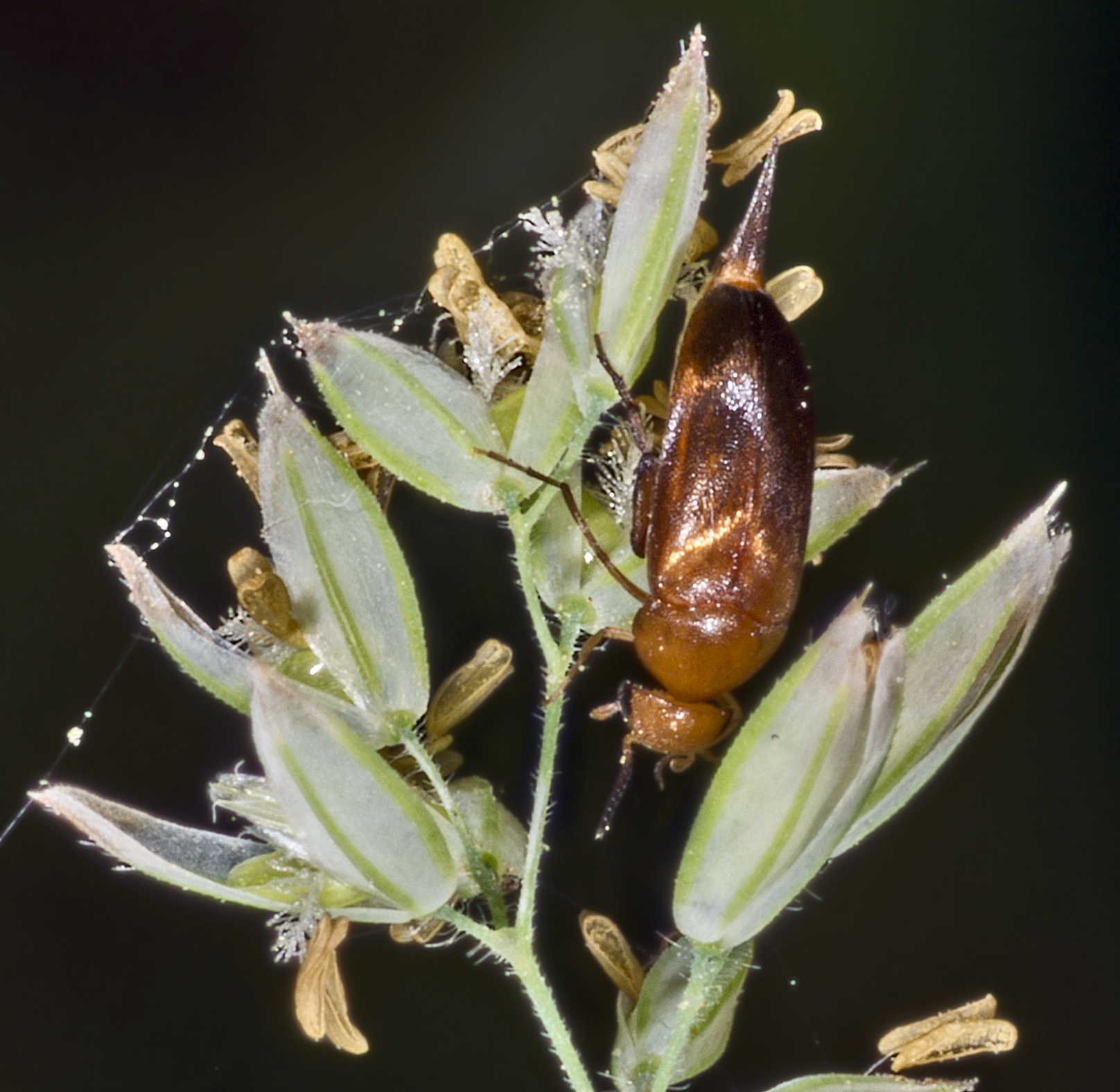
- Mordellistena neuwaldeggiana

Scientific classification
- Domain: Eukaryota
- Kingdom: Animalia
- Phylum: Arthropoda
- Class: Insecta
- Order: Coleoptera
- Suborder: Polyphaga
- Infraorder: Cucujiformia
- Family: Mordellidae
- Genus: Mordellistena
- Species: M. neuwaldeggiana

Binomial name
- Mordellistena neuwaldeggiana (Panzer, 1796)

Synonyms
- Mordella neuwaldeggiana Panzer, 1796; Mordella brunnea Fabricius, 1801; Mordella ferruginea Marsham, 1802; Nattirica meridionalis Costa, 1854

= Mordellistena neuwaldeggiana =

Species of beetle

Mordellistena neuwaldeggiana is a species of beetle in the family Mordellidae. It was described by Georg Wolfgang Franz Panzer in 1796. It is widely distributed in Europe.
