= Stifford =

Human settlement in Essex, England

Coordinates: 51.497°N 0.303°E

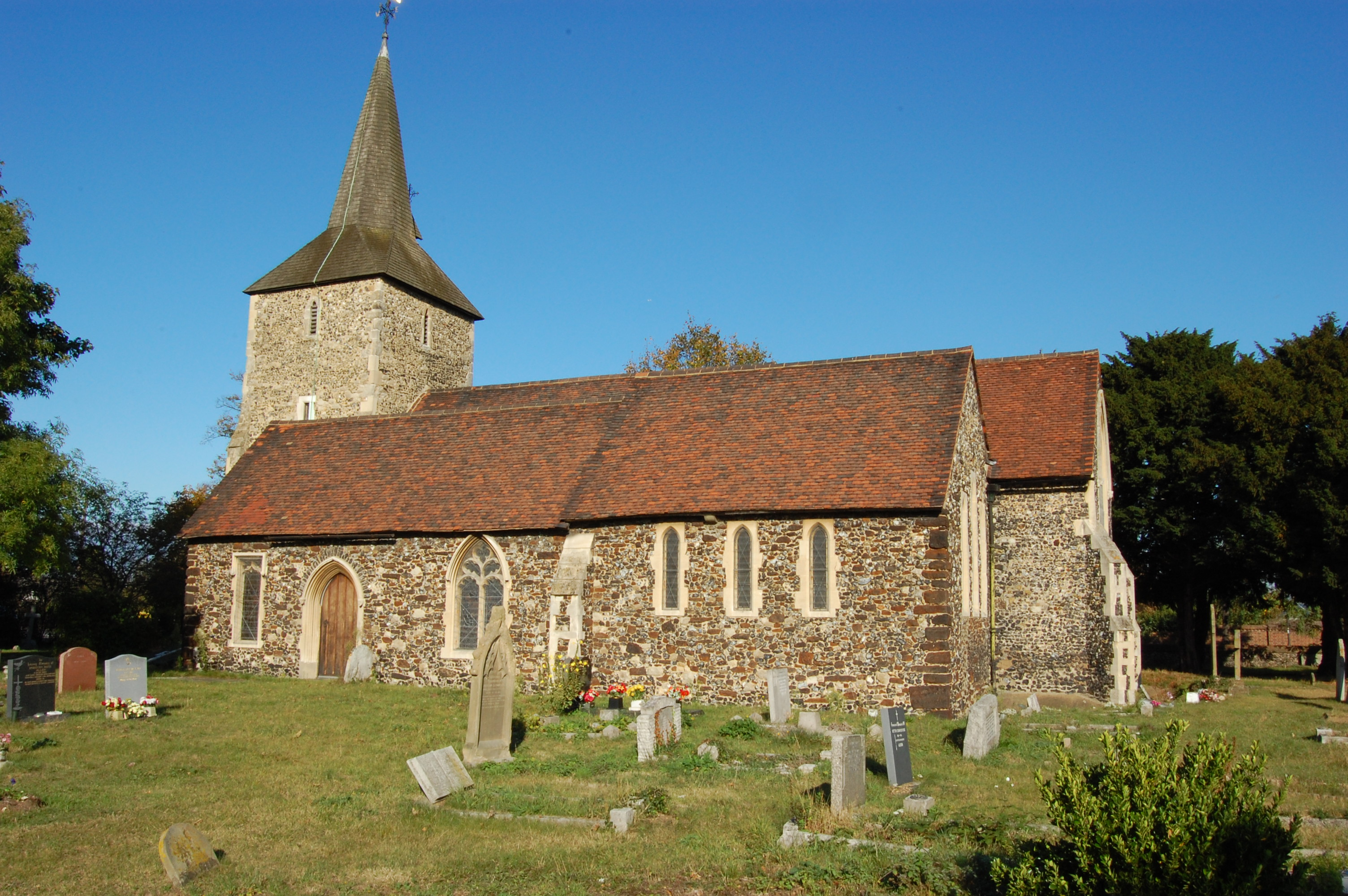
- Stifford parish church

- Location within Essex
- OS grid reference: TQ599778
- Unitary authority: Thurrock
- Ceremonial county: Essex
- Region: East
- Country: England
- Sovereign state: United Kingdom
- Post town: GRAYS
- Postcode district: RM16, RM17, RM20
- Dialling code: 01375, 01708
- Police: Essex
- Fire: Essex
- Ambulance: East of England
- UK Parliament: Thurrock

Stifford is an area in the town of Grays in the borough of Thurrock in Essex, England. Stifford was historically a parish; the parish was abolished for civil purposes in 1936 when Stifford became part of Thurrock. Stifford is in two main parts: the original village, now known as North Stifford, lies to the north of the modern A13 dual carriageway. South Stifford is a largely residential area south of the A13 and to the west of Grays town centre. Stifford also gives its name to the Stifford Clays housing estate to the north of Grays.

== Toponymy ==
The place name Stifford is first recorded in Domesday as Stiforda and means "path ford". The ford was across the Mardyke which flows through North Stifford before joining the Thames at Purfleet.

== History ==
Stifford was an ancient parish in the Hundred of Chafford in Essex. When elected parish and district councils were established under the Local Government Act 1894, Stifford was included in the Orsett Rural District. The rural district and the civil parish of Stifford were abolished in 1936, becoming part of Thurrock Urban District. At the 1931 census (the last before the abolition of the civil parish), Stifford had a population of 2,188.

== North Stifford ==
The original parish church (St Mary the Virgin) is located within North Stifford. The church is originally 12th century with later 13th, 14th and 19th century alterations and extensions, and is a Grade I listed building. The church contains several interesting medieval monumental brasses. William Palin who was rector between 1834 and 1882 wrote the earliest local histories devoted solely to the Thurrock area - Stifford and its Neighbourhood (1871) and More about Stifford and its Neighbourhood (1872). Palin was followed in 1980 by The Stifford Saga by Doreen Dean and Pamela Studd and in 2012 The Idyll in the Middyl by Cliff and Jan Cowin. The North Stifford Village sign was unveiled on 1 July 2011

== South Stifford ==
South Stifford is a small residential area in the town of Grays which separates the town centre from West Thurrock and Lakeside Shopping Centre. It serves as a residential hub for the people who work at the local factories and surrounding retail areas, however it has recently been overshadowed by the huge housing estate of Chafford Hundred.

== Education ==
South Stifford has one primary school, Stifford Primary School.
