= 1999 Thurrock Council election =

1999 UK local government election

The 1999 Thurrock Council election took place on 6 May 1999 to elect members of Thurrock Council in Essex, England. One third of the council was up for election and the Labour party stayed in overall control of the council. Overall turnout in the election was 20.0%.

After the election, the composition of the council was

- Labour 45
- Conservative 1

== Election result ==
Thurrock local election result 1999
Party	Seats	Gains	Losses	Net gain/loss	Seats %	Votes %	Votes	+/−
Labour	16	0	1	-1	94.1	63.7	10,232	
Conservative	1	1	0	+1	5.9	33.1	5,318	
Liberal Democrats	0	0	0	0	0	2.7	434	
Grays Residents Ind. Party	0	0	0	0	0	0.5	79	

Two Labour candidates were unopposed in the election.

== Ward results ==
Aveley
Party	Candidate	Votes	%	±%
Labour	Graham Timms	635	53.4	
Conservative	Yvonne Partridge	299	25.1	
Liberal Democrats	John Livermore	256	21.5	
Majority		336	38.3	
Turnout		1,190		
Labour hold		Swing		

Belhus
Party	Candidate	Votes	%	±%
Labour	David Hooper	756	69.2	
Conservative	David Potter	337	30.8	
Majority		419	38.4	
Turnout		1,093		
Labour hold		Swing		

Chadwell St Mary
Party	Candidate	Votes	%	±%
Labour	Anthony Fish	1,078	76.1	
Conservative	Kazimierz Rytter	338	23.9	
Majority		740	52.2	
Turnout		1,416		
Labour hold		Swing		

Chafford Hundred
Party	Candidate	Votes	%	±%
Conservative	John Vesey	506	65.3	
Labour	Pauline De'Ath	269	34.7	
Majority		237	30.6	
Turnout		775		
Conservative gain from Labour		Swing		

Corringham West
Party	Candidate	Votes	%	±%
Labour	Nigel Barron	505	68.5	
Conservative	Ian Harrison	232	31.5	
Majority		273	37.0	
Turnout		737		
Labour hold		Swing		

East Tilbury
Party	Candidate	Votes	%	±%
Labour	Barry Palmer	947	82.6	
Conservative	Nikki Lewis	199	17.4	
Majority		748	65.2	
Turnout		1,146		
Labour hold		Swing		

Grays Riverside
Party	Candidate	Votes	%	±%
Labour	John Kent	611	65.1	
Conservative	James Carter	190	20.2	
Grays Residents Ind. Party	James Calder	79	8.4	
Liberal Democrats	Peter Saunders	59	6.3	
Majority		421	44.9	
Turnout		939		
Labour hold		Swing		

Grays Thurrock
Party	Candidate	Votes	%	±%
Labour	Yash Gupta	821	64.0	
Conservative	Ronald Jameson	343	26.7	
Liberal Democrats	David Coward	119	9.3	
Majority		478	37.3	
Turnout		1,283		
Labour hold		Swing		

Ockendon
Party	Candidate	Votes	%	±%
Labour	Merlyn Jones	818	68.1	
Conservative	Claire Riley	384	31.9	
Majority		434	36.2	
Turnout		1,202		
Labour hold		Swing		

Stanford-le-Hope East
Party	Candidate	Votes	%	±%
Labour	Julian Norris	693		
Labour	Peter Cooper	685		
Conservative	Anita Bailey	318		
Conservative	Alan Bailey	308		
Turnout		2,004		
Labour hold		Swing		
Labour hold		Swing		

Stanford-le-Hope West
Party	Candidate	Votes	%	±%
Labour	Roger Moore	503	52.5	
Conservative	Anne Cheale	455	47.5	
Majority		48	5.0	
Turnout		958		
Labour hold		Swing		

Stifford
Party	Candidate	Votes	%	±%
Labour	Allan McPherson	719	57.0	
Conservative	Pauline Campbell	543	43.0	
Majority		176	14.0	
Turnout		1,262		
Labour hold		Swing		

The Homesteads
Party	Candidate	Votes	%	±%
Labour	Margaret Kirkwood	702	52.7	
Conservative	John Everett	631	47.3	
Majority		71	5.4	
Turnout		1,333		
Labour hold		Swing		

Tilbury Riverside
Party	Candidate	Votes	%	±%
Labour	Malcolm Southam	uncontested		
Labour hold		Swing		

Tilbury St Chads
Party	Candidate	Votes	%	±%
Labour	Andrew Smith	uncontested		
Labour hold		Swing		

West Thurrock
Party	Candidate	Votes	%	±%
Labour	Richard Price	490	67.6	
Conservative	Henry Coe-Welch	235	32.4	
Majority		255	35.2	
Turnout		725		
Labour hold		Swing		
