= Lakeside Shopping Centre =

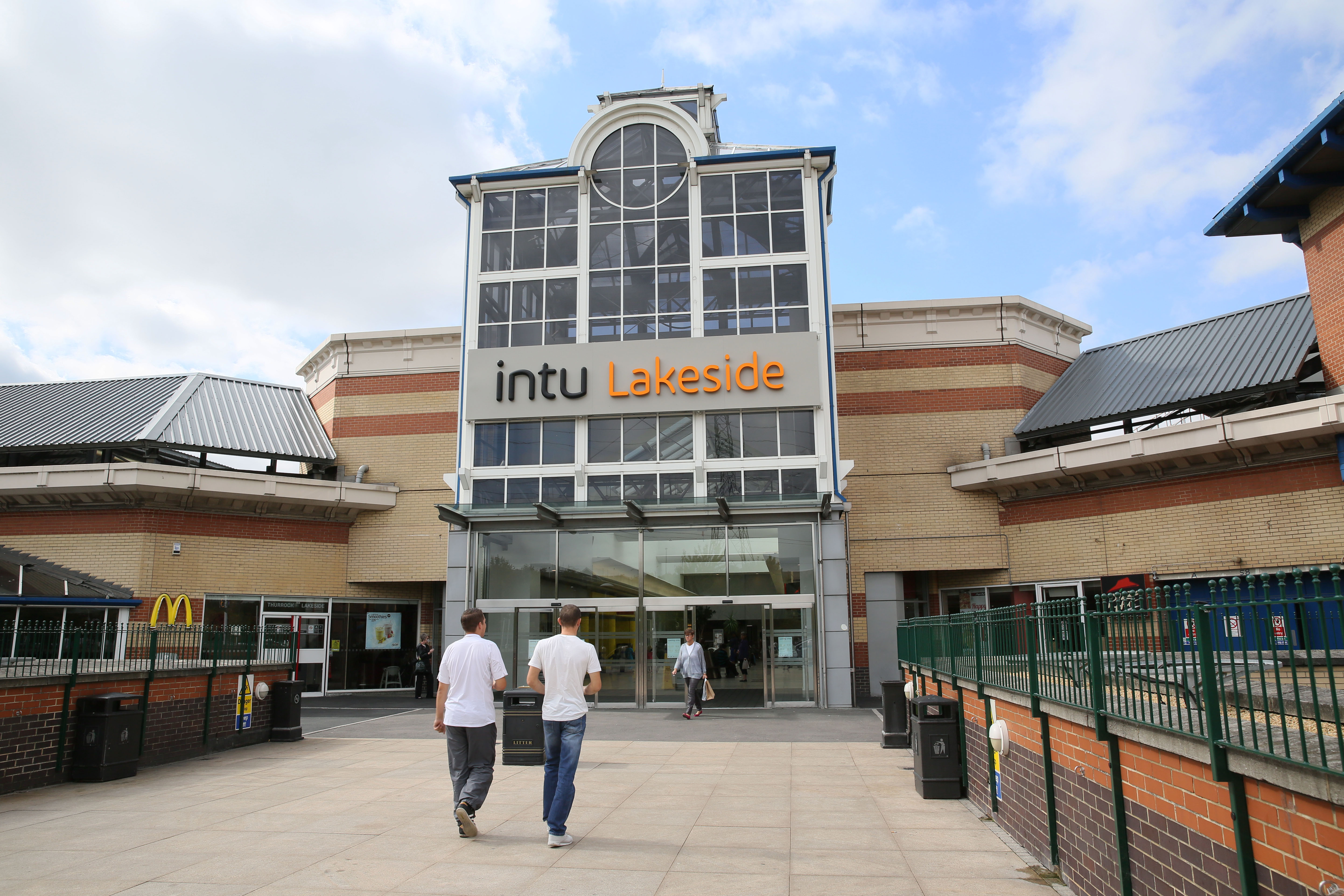
- Location: Thurrock, Essex, England
- Coordinates: 51°29′N 0°17′E
- Opened: 25 October 1990
- Owner: SGS UK Retail
- Architect: Chapman Taylor
- Num. of stores: 245
- Num. of anchor tenants: 4
- Floor area: 1,434,000 sq ft (133,200 m^{2})
- Floors: 3
- Parking: 11,857 spaces
- Public transit: Chafford Hundred station
- Website: lakeside-shopping.com

Lakeside Shopping Centre (commonly known as Lakeside) is a large out-of-town shopping centre located in West Thurrock, Essex just beyond the eastern boundary of Greater London. It was constructed on the site of a former chalk quarry. The first tenants moved into the complex in 1988 and it was completed in 1990, being opened on 25 October of that year by Princess Alexandra of Kent, Marcus Bradford and Angus Ogilvy. New spaces in the red car park were added as recently as October 2019.

The shopping centre, in addition to the retail parks, forms one of the largest shopping areas in a single location within Europe, with almost 2,600,000 square feet (240,000 m^{2}) of retail space on a site of 200 acres (0.81 km^{2}). The community of Chafford Hundred has grown to the east of the centre since its opening. Its main rival is the Bluewater Shopping Centre within Western Quarry in Greenhithe, Kent, just across the River Thames.

The centre was rebranded as Intu Lakeside in 2013, following the renaming of parent Capital Shopping Centres as Intu.

The centre was sold in 2020, after Intu went into administration. In November 2020, Lakeside was taken over by Savills and was renamed Lakeside Shopping Centre.

Lakeside has been described as being Thurrock's "de facto town centre". Thurrock Council wants to make it a "regional town centre", with plans to build new shops, facilities and 3,000 homes. A road linking it to the nearby Lakeside Basin will also be built. On 7 July 2024, a fire occurred there.

== Main shopping centre ==
The shopping centre is the eleventh largest in Britain with 1,434,000 sq ft (133,200 m^{2}) available as retail floorspace - the MetroCentre in Gateshead, after its expansion in 2004, is the largest. There are over 250 shops (including the anchor stores of JD Sports, Next, Marks & Spencer and Primark), 50 cafes and restaurants, and a 26-acre (110,000 m^{2}) lake named Alexandra Lake with a PADI certified diving school complex (now an Aqua Park). Lakeside has on average 500,000 visitors per week.

It is currently open on weekdays from 10:00 to 21:00, and on Saturday from 09:00 to 21:00, and Sunday from 11:00 to 17:00.

Following Intu Properties plc entering administration in June 2020, a subsidiary of the company called Intu SGS received funding to take full control of the centre along with Braehead, Victoria Centre and Intu Watford. The transfer from Intu to Intu SGS is expected to take place by the end of 2020, and will involve Global Mutual becoming asset manager of the centres and Savills serving as property manager.

== Transport connections ==
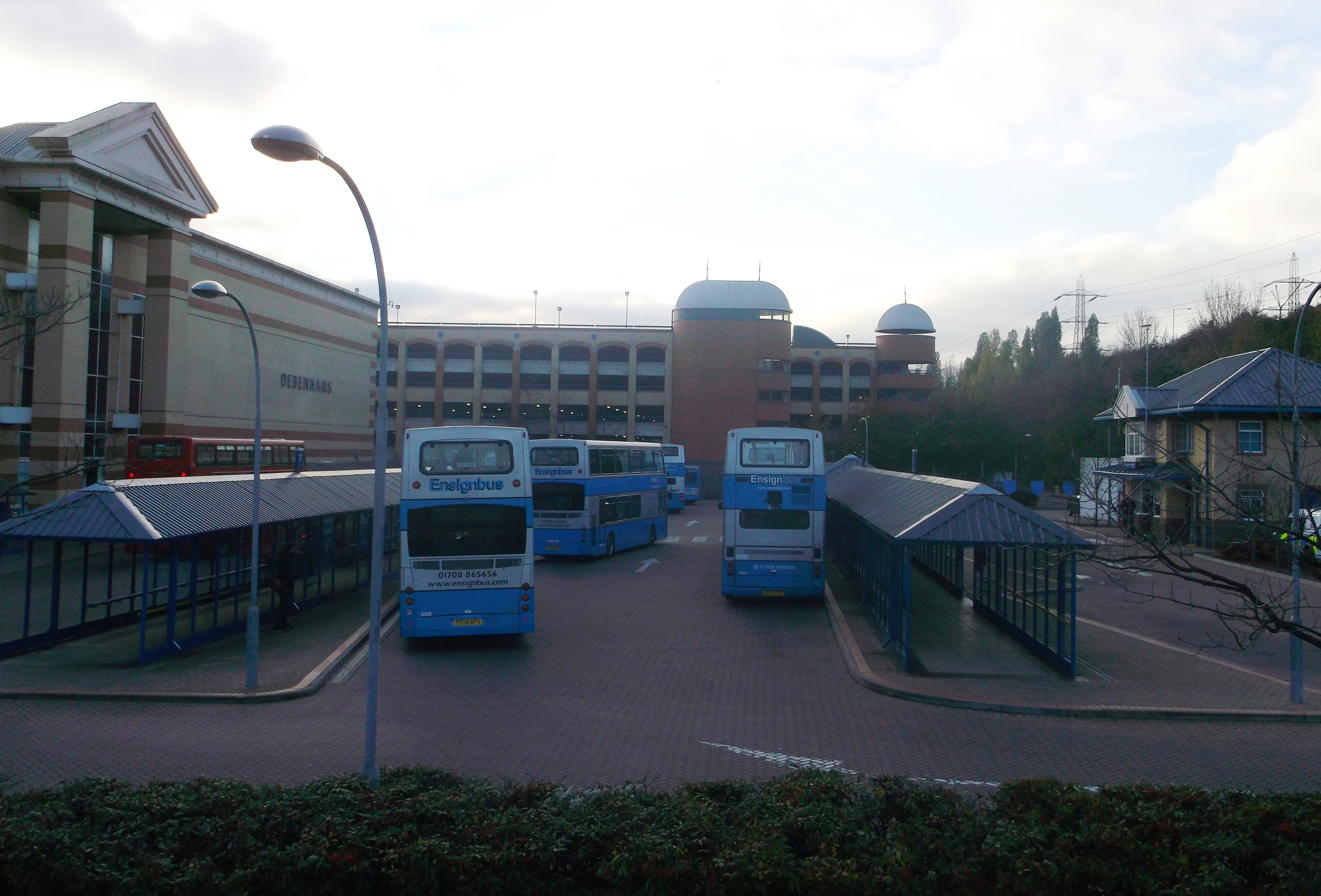
Lakeside bus station

The centre has a direct link to Chafford Hundred railway station where c2c trains run to London Fenchurch Street via Upminster and West Ham or east towards Southend Central via Grays and Stanford-le-Hope.

The centre is connected to the M25 motorway which is London's outermost ring road running south towards Dartford and Gatwick and North towards Enfield, Watford and Heathrow. As well as the M25 the centre is connected to the A13 road which connects central and east London to Basildon and Southend-on-Sea.

It is connected to the Transport for London bus network by 370 to Romford and 372 to Hornchurch with other operators such as Ensignbus to the surrounding Thurrock area and First Essex's route 100 to Basildon. Route X80 operated by Ensignbus provides a link to Bluewater across the Dartford Crossing.

== New developments ==
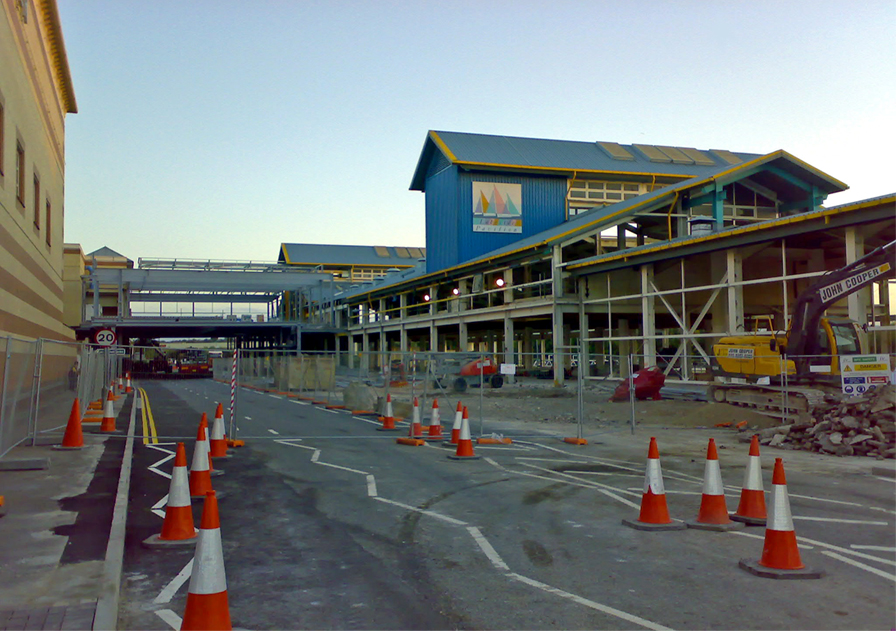
'The Boardwalk' under construction in early September 2006, showing the new bridge to the main shopping centre and the old 'Lakeside Pavilion' building.

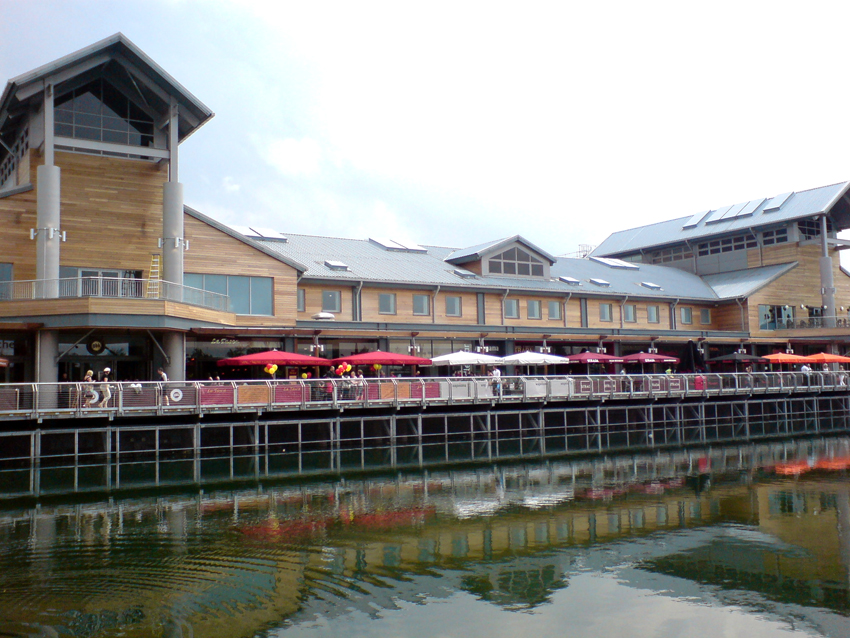
'The Boardwalk' on opening day - 14 June 2007.

To ensure the centre maintains its competition with the newer (and what is perceived by some as more 'upmarket') Bluewater shopping centre, which lies just over the Thames in Greenhithe, Lakeside completed a £30 million refurbishment in 2004. This included new Italian porcelain flooring, new lighting, a new ceiling and new glass roofs which allow much more natural light into the shopping centre. There are now also new, faster lifts, and four more escalators, along with automatic entrance doors. The refurbishment has also encouraged refitting of many shops so that they complement the new surroundings. In September 2005, Next opened an 18,600 sq ft (1,730 m^{2}). extension to its store.

The Lakeside Pavilion, a market area adjoining the main shopping centre via a covered bridge, was closed in 2006 for refurbishment, re-opening in June 2007 as 'The Boardwalk' (referred to as ‘The Lake’ as of 2025). The Boardwalk provides an additional 59,000 sq ft (5,500 m^{2}). of retail space for eleven new restaurants along with more retail and leisure space, as well as a 10-metre boardwalk, offering external seating overlooking Alexandra Lake. The Old Orleans bar and restaurant, a converted paddle steamer, was also refurbished and re-opened on the same day, with new features including a rooftop bar. Later a Miller & Carter restaurant, this partially sank on 23 December 2022.

Vue cinema formed part of the old Lakeside Pavilion, with a seven screen cinema. This closed on 11 January 2007 to be refurbished, and was re-opened on 15 June 2007; the refurbishment resulted in nine state-of-the-art screens with stadium seating. 'Gold Class', a premium screen that housed luxury seating, has since been abandoned in favour of VIP seating sections in every screen. The 'Evolution Screen', with a combination of giant bean bag chairs amongst VIP seating, was the first of its kind in the UK.

Apple opened its tenth UK store at Lakeside Shopping Centre.

Marks & Spencer, one of the centre's four anchor stores, applied for planning permission in July 2008 to allow construction of a 23,970 sq ft (2,230 m^{2}) third storey extension to their store, in addition to an extensive refurbishment of the store layout and customer facilities. The application was approved at the end of October 2008 although no construction ever took place.

Superdry brands opened its largest-ever store at the centre in July 2010, in the unit previously occupied by Woolworths. Ed's Easy Diner also opened their fifth restaurant in the centre's food court in July 2010 (now SIDES Chicken).

Taco Bell re-entered the UK market in June 2010 with the opening of its first stores at intu Lakeside.

On 8 December 2012, US fashion giant Forever 21 opened a 35,000 sq ft (3,300 m^{2}) flagship store at intu Lakeside, in a three-floor unit. In July 2016 this store closed down, with H&M moving in to the store in December 2016.

Intu Lakeside was granted permission in 2012 to extend to include 30-40 new stores, a new footbridge across the Alexandra Lake to the Lakeside Retail Park, a new leisure area, a new 80 bed Travelodge hotel overlooking the river and a brand new transport hub where the current railway station bridge is to allow easier interchange. The new 225,000 sq ft leisure area, The Quay, was completed in early 2019 and includes a Nickelodeon-branded entertainment centre.

In spring 2022 it was announced that Marks and Spencer would relocate from their longstanding position in the centre of the mall to take over the premises vacated a year earlier by the closure of Debenhams.

On 20 October 2023 it was announced that the House of Fraser store would be closing on 30 December 2023. Next relocated to this unit in July 2025. JD Sports moved into part of the former Marks & Spencer unit in Autumn 2025.

== Docusoap ==
In 1998, Lakesiders was a BBC docusoap narrated by Pauline Quirke following the activities of management including centre manager Richard Belt, shopkeepers and staff of the shopping centre. The fractious working relationship between Essex FM's breakfast show DJ Martin Day and his boss Paul Chantler also featured. The theme music was by Simon May. A sequel, Return to Lakesiders, was filmed by the BBC in 2007 and was broadcast on BBC Two 18–22 August 2008.
