= Essex Police, Fire and Crime Commissioner =

Elected official in Essex, England

- Incumbent; Roger Hirst since 12 May 2016
- Police, fire and crime commissioner of Essex Police & Essex Fire and Rescue Service
- Reports to: Essex Police, Fire and Crime Panel
- Appointer: Electorate of Essex
- Term length: Four years
- Constituting instrument: Police Reform and Social Responsibility Act 2011
- Precursor: Essex Police Authority
- Inaugural holder: Nick Alston
- Formation: 22 November 2012
- Deputy: Deputy Police and Crime Commissioner
- Salary: £91,600
- Website: www.essex.pfcc.police.uk

The Essex Police, Fire and Crime Commissioner is the police and crime commissioner, an elected official tasked with setting out the way crime is tackled by Essex Police in the English County of Essex. The post was created in November 2012, following an election held on 15 November 2012, and replaced the Essex Police Authority. The incumbent is Roger Hirst, who represents the Conservative Party.

== List of Essex police and crime commissioners ==
Commissioner	Took office	Left office	Party	Election
Nick Alston	22 November 2012	11 May 2016	Conservative	2012
Roger Hirst	12 May 2016	Incumbent	Conservative	2016, 2021, 2024

== Election results ==
The results of the elections were as follows.

=== 2024 election ===
2024 Essex police, fire and crime commissioner election
Party	Candidate	Votes	%	±%
Conservative	Roger Hirst	126,447	36.5	▼17.5
Labour Co-op	Adam Fox	116,875	33.7	▲10.8
Liberal Democrats	Kieron Franks	52,922	15.3	▲2.0
English Democrat	Robin Tilbrook	44,909	13.16	▲10.00
Turnout		346,342		
Conservative hold		Swing		

=== 2021 election ===
The election scheduled for 2020 was postponed along with all other local elections until 2021 due to the COVID-19 pandemic.

Essex Constabulary Police and Crime Commissioner election, 2021
Party	Candidate	1st round		2nd round			1st round votesTransfer votes, 2nd round
Party	Candidate	Total	Of round	Transfers	Total	Of round	1st round votesTransfer votes, 2nd round
Conservative	Roger Hirst	235,346	54.0%				
Labour Co-op	Chris Vince	80,832	22.9%				
Liberal Democrats	John Whitehouse	58,131	13.3%				
English Democrat	Robin Tilbrook	42,831	9.8%				
Total votes		436,020					
Conservative hold							

=== 2016 election ===
Essex Constabulary Police and Crime Commissioner election, 2016
Party	Candidate	1st round		2nd round			1st round votesTransfer votes, 2nd round
Party	Candidate	Total	Of round	Transfers	Total	Of round	1st round votesTransfer votes, 2nd round
Conservative	Roger Hirst	110,858	33.5%	25,090	135,948	56.7%	
UKIP	Bob Spink	80,832	24.4%	22,960	103,792	43.3%	
Labour	Chris Vince	65,325	19.7%				
Zero Tolerance Policing ex Chief	Martin Terry	43,128	13.0%				
Liberal Democrats	Kevin McNamara	30,804	9.3%				
Turnout		330,947	26.1%				
Rejected ballots		10,744	3.1%				
Total votes		341,691					
Registered electors		1,311,091					
Conservative hold							

=== 2012 election ===
Essex Police and Crime Commissioner election, 2012
Party	Candidate	1st round		2nd round			1st round votesTransfer votes, 2nd round
Party	Candidate	Total	Of round	Transfers	Total	Of round	1st round votesTransfer votes, 2nd round
Conservative	Nick Alston	51,325	30.5%	11,025	62,350	51.5%	
Independent	Mick Thwaites	40,132	23.9%	18,532	58,664	48.5%	
Labour	Val Morris-Cook	27,926	16.6%				
Independent	Linda Belgrove	22,163	13.2%				
UKIP	Andrew Smith	15,138	9.0%				
English Democrat	Robin Tilbrook	11,550	6.9%				
Turnout		168,234	12.8%				
Rejected ballots		3,452	2.0%				
Total votes		171,686	13.1				
Registered electors		1,313,745					
Conservative win							
