= Roger Hirst =

English politician

Roger Hirst MBE
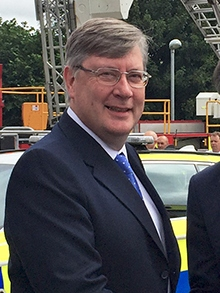
- Hirst in 2017

Essex Police, Fire and Crime Commissioner
- Incumbent
- Assumed office 12 May 2016
- Preceded by: Nick Alston

Essex County Councillor for Brentwood Hutton
- In office 4 June 2009 – 4 May 2017
- Preceded by: John Roberts
- Succeeded by: Louise McKinlay

Personal details
- Party: Conservative

Roger Charles Hirst MBE is an English Conservative politician who has served as Essex Police, Fire and Crime Commissioner since 2016. He was elected to the post on 5 May 2016, succeeding the previous incumbent, Nick Alston. He was re-elected in 2021 and 2024.

In July 2026, Hirst was successfully sued for defamation by the Daily Telegraph columnist Allison Pearson, concerning comments he made during a police investigation into one of Pearson's tweets. Pearson received a public apology and a five-figure payout from Hirst.

Mr Hirst was a Cabinet Member for Essex County Council, and Deputy Leader of Brentwood Borough Council ("BBC"), until he stood down to focus on the PCC campaign. He was first elected as a BBC councillor for the ward of Hutton South in a 2009 by election.

== Honours ==
In the 2026 New Year Honours, Hirst was appointed an MBE for services to policing and community safety.
