= Thurrock Council elections =

Local government elections in Essex, England

Thurrock Council is the local authority for the unitary authority of Thurrock in Essex, England. Until 1 April 1998 it was a non-metropolitan district. One third of the council is elected each year, followed by one year without an election. Since the unitary authority was first elected in 1997, the council has consisted of 49 councillors elected from 20 wards.

== Council elections ==
=== Non-metropolitan district elections ===
- 1973 Thurrock Borough Council election
- 1976 Thurrock Borough Council election
- 1979 Thurrock Borough Council election (New ward boundaries)
- 1980 Thurrock Borough Council election
- 1982 Thurrock Borough Council election
- 1983 Thurrock Borough Council election
- 1984 Thurrock Borough Council election
- 1986 Thurrock Borough Council election
- 1987 Thurrock Borough Council election
- 1988 Thurrock Borough Council election
- 1990 Thurrock Borough Council election
- 1991 Thurrock Borough Council election
- 1992 Thurrock Borough Council election
- 1994 Thurrock Borough Council election (Borough boundary changes took place but the number of seats remained the same)
- 1995 Thurrock Borough Council election
- 1996 Thurrock Borough Council election

=== Unitary authority elections ===
- 1997 Thurrock Council election (New ward boundaries)
- 1999 Thurrock Council election
- 2000 Thurrock Council election
- 2001 Thurrock Council election
- 2002 Thurrock Council election
- 2004 Thurrock Council election (New ward boundaries)
- 2006 Thurrock Council election
- 2007 Thurrock Council election
- 2008 Thurrock Council election
- 2010 Thurrock Council election
- 2011 Thurrock Council election
- 2012 Thurrock Council election
- 2014 Thurrock Council election
- 2015 Thurrock Council election
- 2016 Thurrock Council election
- 2018 Thurrock Council election
- 2019 Thurrock Council election
- 2021 Thurrock Council election
- 2022 Thurrock Council election
- 2023 Thurrock Council election
- 2024 Thurrock Council election
- 2026 Thurrock Council election (New ward boundaries)

== Council composition ==
Year	Labour	Conservative	UKIP	Liberal Democrats (Note: Includes totals for the predecessors of the Liberal Democrats, the Liberal Party and SDP (both of which participated in the Alliance).)	Reform UK	Independents & Others	Council control after election
Local government reorganisation; council established (39 seats)
1973	33	3	–	0	–	3	Labour
1976	25	11	–	0	–	3	Labour
New ward boundaries (39 seats)
1979	18	15	–	0	–	6	No overall control
1980	19	13	–	0	–	7	No overall control
1982	21	10	–	1	–	7	Labour
1983	23	10	–	1	–	5	Labour
1984	27	10	–	0	–	2	Labour
1986	29	7	–	0	–	3	Labour
1987	28	9	–	0	–	2	Labour
1988	29	8	–	0	–	2	Labour
1990	31	7	–	0	–	1	Labour
1991	33	6	–	0	–	0	Labour
1992	29	9	–	0	–	1	Labour
1994	29	7	0	0	–	3	Labour
1995	32	4	0	0	–	3	Labour
1996	38	1	0	0	–	0	Labour
Thurrock becomes a unitary authority; new ward boundaries (39 seats)
1997	36	3	0	0	–	0	Labour
New ward boundaries (49 seats)
1999	45	1	0	0	–	3 (Note: Including 3 vacant seats)	Labour
2000	38	11	0	0	–	0	Labour
2001	37	10	0	0	–	2	Labour
2002	37	9	0	1	–	2	Labour
New ward boundaries (49 seats)
2004	19	28	0	0	–	2	Conservative
2006	21	26	0	0	–	2	Conservative
2007	22	24	0	0	–	3	No overall control
2008	22	24	0	0	–	3 (Note: Including 1 BNP)	No overall control
2010	22	23	0	0	–	4 (Note: Including 1 BNP)	No overall control
2011	24	22	0	0	–	3	No overall control
2012	25	21	1	0	–	2	Labour
2014	23	18	6	0	–	2	No overall control
2015	18	17	13	0	–	1	No overall control
2016	14	17	17	0	–	1	No overall control
2018	17	20	0	0	–	12 (Note: 12 Thurrock Independents)	No overall control
2019	17	22	0	0	–	10 (Note: Including 9 Thurrock Independents)	No overall control
2021	16	29	0	0	0	4 (Note: Including 3 Thurrock Independents)	Conservative
2022	14	30	0	0	0	5 (Note: Including 3 Thurrock Independents)	Conservative
2023	19	26	0	0	0	4 (Note: Including 1 Thurrock Independent)	Conservative
2024	27	13	0	0	–	9	Labour
New ward boundaries (49 seats)
2026	2	2	–	0	45	0	Reform

== Results maps ==
1979 results map

1980 results map

1982 results map

1983 results map

1984 results map

1986 results map

1987 results map

1988 results map

1990 results map

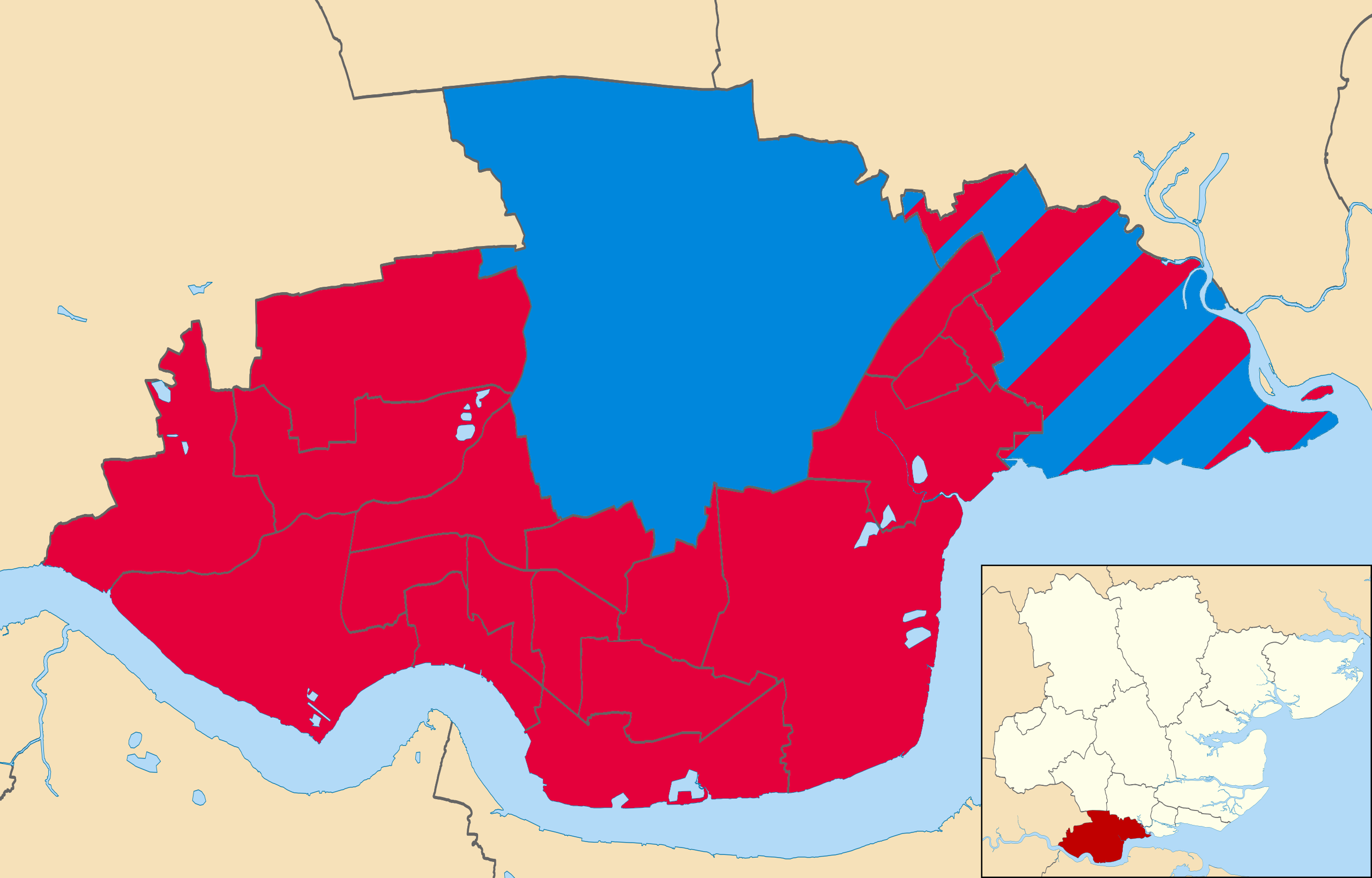
1997 results map

2004 results map

2006 results map

2007 results map

2008 results map

2010 results map

2011 results map

2012 results map

2014 results map

2015 results map

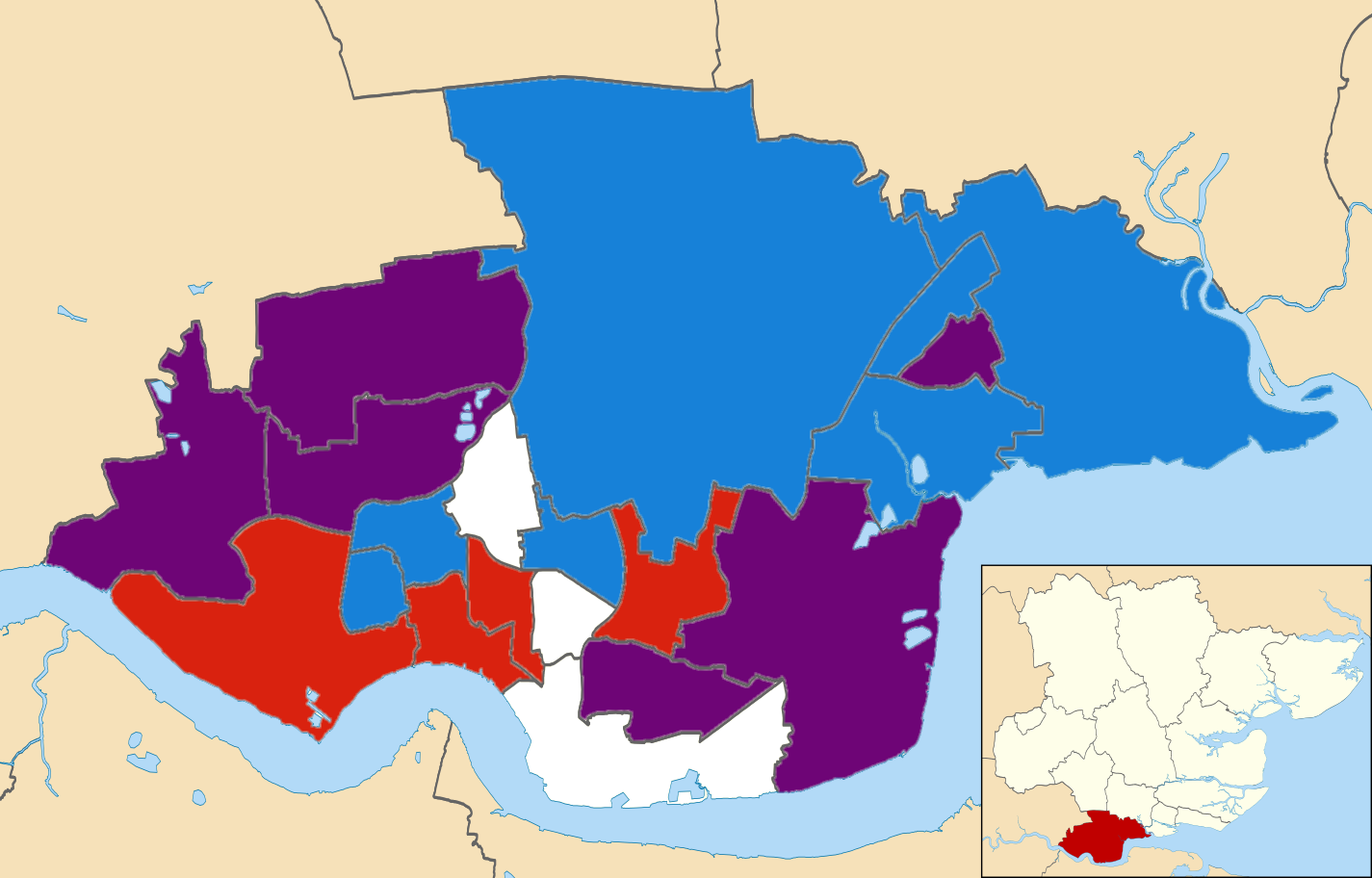
2016 results map

2018 results map

2019 results map

2021 results map

2022 results map

2023 results map

2024 results map

2026 results map

== By-elections ==
=== 1998-2002 ===
Stifford By-Election 23 July 1998
Party	Candidate	Votes	%	±%
Labour	George Watts	578	56.9	−1.8
Conservative	Pauline Campbell	304	30.0	−11.3
Liberal Democrats	Tracey Ashdown	133	13.1	+13.1
Majority		274	26.9	
Turnout		1,015		
Labour hold		Swing		

Grays By-Election 20 January 2000
Party	Candidate	Votes	%	±%
Labour	Rosemary McMahon	269	52.5	−11.5
Conservative	Kazimierz Rytter	154	30.1	−3.4
Liberal Democrats	John Livermore	89	17.4	+8.1
Majority		115	22.4	
Turnout		512	8.0	
Labour hold		Swing		

Homesteads By-Election 20 January 2000
Party	Candidate	Votes	%	±%
Conservative	John Everett	490	46.9	−0.4
Labour	Denise Cooper	419	40.1	−12.5
Independent	James Mallon	71	6.8	+6.8
Liberal Democrats	David Coward	64	6.1	+6.1
Majority		71	6.8	
Turnout		1,044	17.4	
Conservative gain from Labour		Swing		

Aveley By-Election 25 May 2000
Party	Candidate	Votes	%	±%
Conservative	Neil Pearce	454	64.8	+25.7
Green	Dean Hall	247	35.2	+31.9
Majority		207	29.6	
Turnout		701	12.5	
Conservative gain from Labour		Swing		

East Tilbury By-Election 25 January 2001
Party	Candidate	Votes	%	±%
Independent	John Purkiss	623	67.6	+67.6
Labour	David Gooding	139	15.1	−49.6
Conservative	Robert Barnes	135	14.6	−20.7
Liberal Democrats	David Coward	25	2.7	+2.7
Majority		484	52.5	
Turnout		922	21.4	
Independent gain from Labour		Swing		

Aveley By-Election 6 September 2001
Party	Candidate	Votes	%	±%
Conservative	Colin Churchman	803	58.7	+19.5
Labour	Wahidur Rahman	451	32.9	−0.8
Liberal Democrats	John Lathan	85	6.2	−17.7
Green	Dean Hall	31	2.3	−1.0
Majority		351	25.8	
Turnout		1,370	24.0	
Conservative hold		Swing		

Little Thurrock Blackshotts By-Election 6 September 2001
Party	Candidate	Votes	%	±%
Conservative	Benjamin Maney	362	45.4	−16.7
Labour	Eunice Southam	274	34.3	+6.1
Independent	Geoffrey Slocock	117	14.7	+14.7
Liberal Democrats	Mark Meechan	45	5.7	−4.0
Majority		88	11.1	
Turnout		798	20.8	
Conservative hold		Swing		

=== 2002-2006 ===
Tilbury Riverside By-Election 25 July 2002
Party	Candidate	Votes	%	±%
Labour	Kenneth Barrett	358	72.9	−9.3
Liberal Democrats	David Coward	70	14.3	+14.3
Conservative	Jean Watts	63	12.9	−4.9
Majority		288	58.6	
Turnout		491	13.0	
Labour hold		Swing		

Stanford Le Hope East By-Election 29 May 2003
Party	Candidate	Votes	%	±%
Conservative	Terence Hipsey	511	40.3	−7.2
Liberal Democrats	James Thompson	428	33.8	+33.8
Labour	Julian Norris	329	25.9	−26.6
Majority		83	6.5	
Turnout		1,268	29.4	
Conservative gain from Labour		Swing		

Grays Riverside By-Election 4 September 2003
Party	Candidate	Votes	%	±%
BNP	Nicholas Geri	552	38.2	+38.2
Conservative	Nicholas Edwards	382	26.4	−3.3
Labour	Remia Sear	374	25.9	−25.2
Liberal Democrats	John Livermore	137	9.5	−9.7
Majority		170	11.8	
Turnout		1,445	22.0	
BNP gain from Labour		Swing		

Grays Riverside By-Election 1 December 2005
Party	Candidate	Votes	%	±%
Labour	Val Morris-Cook	575	42.4	+1.8
Conservative	Sharon Ponder	348	25.7	−7.2
BNP	Emma Colgate	340	25.1	−1.4
Liberal Democrats	John Livermore	92	6.8	+6.8
Majority		227	16.7	
Turnout		1,355	20.0	
Labour hold		Swing		

The Homesteads By-Election 1 December 2005
Party	Candidate	Votes	%	±%
Labour	Salvatore Benson	661	42.2	−1.1
Conservative	Pauline Tolson	534	34.1	−22.6
Liberal Democrats	Paul Riley	220	14.1	+14.1
BNP	John Cotter	150	9.6	+9.6
Majority		127	8.1	
Turnout		1,565	23.2	
Labour gain from Conservative		Swing		

=== 2010-2014 ===
Stifford Clays By-Election 17 October 2013
Party	Candidate	Votes	%	±%
Labour	Susan Shinnick	646	36.8	−8.3
Conservative	Danny Nicklen	570	32.5	+5.6
UKIP	Clive Broad	504	28.7	+4.3
Liberal Democrats	Kevin Mulroue	35	2.0	−1.5
Majority		76	4.3	
Turnout		1,755		
Labour hold		Swing		

=== 2014-2018 ===
West Thurrock and South Stifford By-Election 16 October 2014
Party	Candidate	Votes	%	±%
Labour	Terry Brookes	903	50.3	+3.0
UKIP	Russell Cherry	621	34.6	+0.5
Conservative	John Rowles	270	15.1	−0.2
Majority		282	15.7	
Turnout		1,794		
Labour hold		Swing		

Aveley and Uplands By-Election 4 December 2014
Party	Candidate	Votes	%	±%
UKIP	Tim Aker	747	41.0	−6.2
Conservative	Teresa Webster	520	28.5	−1.2
Labour	John O'Regan	338	18.6	+2.4
Independent	Eddie Stringer	217	11.9	+11.9
Majority		227	12.5	
Turnout		1,822		
UKIP hold		Swing		

West Thurrock and South Stifford By-Election 10 September 2015
Party	Candidate	Votes	%	±%
Labour	Cliff Holloway	629	43.0	−3.9
UKIP	Helen Adams	450	30.8	+1.9
Conservative	Tony Coughlin	384	26.2	+2.0
Majority		179	12.2	
Turnout		1,463		
Labour hold		Swing		

=== 2018-2022 ===
Ockendon 22 March 2018
Party	Candidate	Votes	%	±%
Conservative	Andrew Jefferies	696	36.1	
Labour	Les Strange	696	36.1	
Thurrock Ind.	Jack Duffin	531	28.8	
Majority		0		
Turnout				
Conservative gain from UKIP		Swing		

Aveley and Uplands By-Election 21 March 2019
Party	Candidate	Votes	%	±%
Conservative	David Van Day	773	43.6	+16.4
Thurrock Ind.	Alan Field	551	31.1	−12.1
Labour	Charles Curtis	394	22.2	−1.5
Liberal Democrats	Tomas Pilvelis	55	3.1	+3.1
Majority		222	12.5	
Turnout		1,773		
Conservative gain from UKIP		Swing		

=== 2022-2026 ===
Ockendon By-Election 1 May 2025 (2 seats)
Party	Candidate	Votes	%	±%
Reform	Alan Benson	1,214		
Reform	Russell Cherry	1,138		
Conservative	Sue Johnson	533		
Labour	Shalini Bhatt	478		
Conservative	Graham Snell	439		
Labour	Haruna Hamza	438		
Green	Ri Goodyear	93		
Green	Daniel Fallows	86		
Liberal Democrats	Brad Hayman	74		
Independent	Kameel Mohammed	47		
Reform gain from Conservative		Swing		
Reform gain from Labour		Swing		

=== 2026-2030 ===
Grays Riverside By-Election 23 July 2026
Party	Candidate	Votes	%	±%
Labour	Jo Potter	389	30.2	
Reform	Jason Mitchell	362	28.1	
Green	Pauline Weir	354	27.5	
Conservative	Srikanth Panjala	182	14.1	
Majority		27	2.1	
Turnout		1,287		
Labour gain from Reform		Swing		

Grays Town By-Election 23 July 2026
Party	Candidate	Votes	%	±%
Labour	Amin Hoque	673	37.0	
Reform	John Pearson	491	27.0	
Independent	Neil Speight	235	12.9	
Conservative	Joglur Rahman	224	12.3	
Green	Rhea Nathan	160	8.8	
Liberal Democrats	Simon Lancaster	34	1.9	
Majority		182	10.0	
Turnout		1,817		
Labour gain from Reform		Swing		
