= 2001 Thurrock Council election =

2001 UK local government election

The 2001 Thurrock Council election took place on 7 June 2001 to elect members of Thurrock Council in Essex, England. The election took place at the same time as the 2001 general election after being postponed from the first week of May due to an outbreak of foot-and-mouth disease. One third of the council was up for election and the Labour party stayed in overall control of the council.

Among the candidates in the election was Pauline Campbell who stood as an independent after resigning from the Conservatives. Campbell, who was disabled and using a wheelchair, said that she initially told she would be the Conservative candidate but was later informed she could not stand as she would not be able to canvass. However the Conservatives denied this and said that they just wanted to give someone else a chance.

After the election, the composition of the council was

- Labour 37
- Conservative 10
- Independent 2

== Election result ==
Thurrock local election result 2001
Party	Seats	Gains	Losses	Net gain/loss	Seats %	Votes %	Votes	+/−
Labour	15	2	1	+1	83.3	54.9	26,168	+9.6%
Conservative	3	1	2	-1	16.7	37.5	17,874	-5.1%
Liberal Democrats	0	0	0	0	0	5.8	2,772	+0.9%
Independent	0	0	0	0	0	0.9	428	+0.2%
UKIP	0	0	0	0	0	0.6	302	+0.6%
Green	0	0	0	0	0	0.2	108	+0.0%

== Ward results ==
Aveley
Party	Candidate	Votes	%	±%
Conservative	Neil Pearce	1,418	47.3	+8.2
Labour	William Tranter	1,227	40.9	+7.2
Liberal Democrats	John Lathan	248	8.3	−15.6
Green	Dean Hall	108	3.6	+0.3
Majority		191	6.4	+1.0
Turnout		3,001		
Conservative hold		Swing		

Belhus
Party	Candidate	Votes	%	±%
Labour	Margaret Jones	1,584	58.6	−0.2
Conservative	Jane Atkins	694	25.7	−15.5
Liberal Democrats	John Biddall	427	15.8	+15.8
Majority		890	32.9	+15.3
Turnout		2,705		
Labour hold		Swing		

Chadwell St Mary
Party	Candidate	Votes	%	±%
Labour	Alan Warren	2,549	74.2	+8.4
Conservative	Gunther Voggenreiter	885	25.8	−8.4
Majority		1,664	48.4	+16.8
Turnout		3,434		
Labour hold		Swing		

Chafford Hundred
Party	Candidate	Votes	%	±%
Labour	Martin Healy	956	37.5	+5.9
Conservative	Antony Silver	955	37.4	+4.2
Liberal Democrats	Earnshaw Palmer	640	25.1	+5.4
Majority		1	0.1	
Turnout		2,551		
Labour gain from Conservative		Swing		

Corringham and Fobbing
Party	Candidate	Votes	%	±%
Conservative	Ian Harrison	1,435	55.2	+13.7
Labour	Eunice Southam	1,163	44.8	+14.4
Majority		272	10.4	−0.7
Turnout		2,598	60	
Conservative gain from Labour		Swing		

Corringham West
Party	Candidate	Votes	%	±%
Labour	Clinton Sear	1,287	62.0	−6.5
Conservative	Daphne Hart	789	38.0	+6.5
Majority		498	24.0	−13.0
Turnout		2,076		
Labour hold		Swing		

Grays Riverside
Party	Candidate	Votes	%	±%
Labour	Carl Morris	1,601	62.6	+5.6
Conservative	Manfred Koppen	956	37.4	−5.6
Majority		645	25.2	+11.2
Turnout		2,557		
Labour hold		Swing		

Grays Thurrock
Party	Candidate	Votes	%	±%
Labour	Rosemary McMahon	1,991	61.4	+7.2
Conservative	Clive Broad	1,252	38.6	−7.2
Majority		739	22.8	+14.4
Turnout		3,243		
Labour hold		Swing		

Little Thurrock Blackshots
Party	Candidate	Votes	%	±%
Labour	David Gooding	958	43.1	+14.9
Conservative	Benjamin Maney	951	42.8	−19.3
Liberal Democrats	Mark Meechan	315	14.2	+4.5
Majority		7	0.3	
Turnout		2,224		
Labour hold		Swing		

Little Thurrock Rectory
Party	Candidate	Votes	%	±%
Labour	Valerie Cook	1,581	59.6	+15.8
Conservative	James Carter	1,071	40.4	−15.8
Majority		510	19.2	
Turnout		2,652	55.7	
Labour hold		Swing		

Ockendon
Party	Candidate	Votes	%	±%
Labour	Barrie Lawrence	2,100	65.6	+8.0
Conservative	Kazmimierz Rytter	1,100	34.4	−8.0
Majority		1,000	31.2	+16.0
Turnout		3,200		
Labour hold		Swing		

Orsett
Party	Candidate	Votes	%	±%
Conservative	Michael Revell	1,577	57.8	+2.3
Labour	Wahidur Rahman	740	27.1	+5.8
Liberal Democrats	Peter Saunders	413	15.1	+6.3
Majority		837	30.7	−3.5
Turnout		2,730	62	
Conservative hold		Swing		

Stanford-le-Hope West
Party	Candidate	Votes	%	±%
Labour	Alphonse Nuss	1,295		
Labour	Arthur Clarke	1,218		
Conservative	Barry Dorrington	699		
Conservative	Darren Webb	690		
Turnout		3,902		
Labour hold		Swing		
Labour hold		Swing		

Stifford
Party	Candidate	Votes	%	±%
Labour	Gerard Rice	1,572	46.0	−1.4
Conservative	Robert Barnes	1,264	37.0	−7.8
Liberal Democrats	Rabih Makki	327	9.6	+1.8
Independent	Pauline Campbell	254	7.4	+7.4
Majority		308	9.0	+6.4
Turnout		3,417		
Labour hold		Swing		

The Homesteads
Party	Candidate	Votes	%	±%
Labour	Salvatore Benson	1,828	54.3	+14.3
Conservative	John Everett	1,235	36.7	−2.4
UKIP	James Mallon	302	9.0	+9.0
Majority		593	17.6	+16.7
Turnout		3,365		
Labour gain from Conservative		Swing		

Tilbury Riverside
Party	Candidate	Votes	%	±%
Labour	John Garner	1,129	72.7	
Conservative	Yvonne Partridge	269	17.3	
Liberal Democrats	David Coward	154	9.9	
Majority		860	55.4	
Turnout		1,552		
Labour hold		Swing		

West Thurrock
Party	Candidate	Votes	%	±%
Labour	Catherine Kent	1,389	56.8	−6.0
Conservative	Garry Hague	634	25.9	−11.3
Liberal Democrats	John Livermore	248	10.1	+10.1
Independent	Reginald Lee	174	7.1	+7.1
Majority		755	30.9	+5.3
Turnout		2,445		
Labour hold		Swing		

Preceded by 2000 Thurrock Council election	Thurrock local elections	Succeeded by 2002 Thurrock Council election
