= 2004 Thurrock Council election =

2004 UK local government election

Results of the 2004 Thurrock Council election

The 2004 Thurrock Council election took place on 10 June 2004 to elect members of Thurrock Council in Essex, England. The whole council was up for election with boundary changes since the last election in 2002. The Conservative party gained overall control of the council from the Labour party.

== Election result ==
The results saw the Conservatives win control of the council, which Labour had run before the election with 33 of the 49 seats. The Conservatives gained 18 seats while Labour lost 14.

Thurrock local election result 2004
Party	Seats	Gains	Losses	Net gain/loss	Seats %	Votes %	Votes	+/−
Conservative	28			+18	57.1	47.1	31,395	+10.0%
Labour	19			-14	38.8	40.4	26,917	-8.2%
Independent	2			-2	4.1	5.9	3,933	-1.2%
Liberal Democrats	0			-1	0	3.8	2,543	-3.2%
BNP	0			-1	0	2.3	1,531	+2.3%
Green	0			0	0	0.5	324	+0.3%

== Ward results ==
Aveley & Uplands (3)
Party	Candidate	Votes	%	±%
Conservative	Colin Churchman	1,152		
Conservative	John Cowell	1,017		
Conservative	Wendy Herd	926		
Labour	Derek Maynard	471		
Labour	Christopher Seamark	399		
Labour	Anita Nuss	388		
Green	Dean Hall	324		
Turnout		4,677	29.8	

Belhus (3)
Party	Candidate	Votes	%	±%
Labour	Margaret Jones	609		
Labour	David Hooper	564		
Labour	Peter Maynard	561		
Conservative	Jean Watts	481		
Conservative	Susan Edwards	459		
Conservative	Kelvin Watts	421		
Liberal Democrats	John Biddall	331		
Turnout		3,426	22.1	

Chadwell St. Mary (3)
Party	Candidate	Votes	%	±%
Labour	Gordon Barton	834		
Labour	Anthony Fish	786		
Labour	Alan Warren	711		
Conservative	Daphne Hart	464		
Liberal Democrats	Ian Catty	413		
Conservative	Selina Kent	412		
Conservative	Yvonna Partridge	408		
Liberal Democrats	Arthur Bowles	371		
Liberal Democrats	David Coward	302		
Turnout		4,701	24.8	

Chafford & North Stifford (2)
Party	Candidate	Votes	%	±%
Conservative	Garry Hague	562		
Conservative	Neil Rockliffe	469		
Liberal Democrats	Earnshaw Palmer	431		
Liberal Democrats	Derrick Harris	270		
Labour	Martin Healy	268		
Labour	Ian Duffield	246		
Turnout		2,246	28.0	

Corringham & Fobbing (2)
Party	Candidate	Votes	%	±%
Conservative	Ian Harrison	1,017		
Conservative	Anne Cheale	975		
Labour	Julian Norris	487		
Labour	Andrew Noakes	426		
Turnout		2,905	36.1	

East Tilbury (2)
Party	Candidate	Votes	%	±%
Independent	Barry Palmer	1,357		
Independent	John Purkiss	1,263		
Labour	Jonathon Canavon	147		
Labour	Ken Clark	144		
Turnout		2,911	35.1	

Grays Riverside (3)
Party	Candidate	Votes	%	±%
Labour	John Kent	735		
Labour	Denise Cooper	661		
Labour	Carl Morris	651		
Conservative	Allan Edwards	595		
Conservative	Sharon Faulkner	526		
BNP	Nicholas Geri	479		
Conservative	Neil Tuffery	479		
Turnout		4,126	27.6	

Grays Thurrock (3)
Party	Candidate	Votes	%	±%
Labour	Yash Gupta	813		
Labour	Catherine Kent	740		
Labour	Peter Harris	720		
Conservative	Lloyd Brown	675		
Conservative	Adam Cheale	672		
Conservative	Maureen Koppen	646		
Turnout		4,266	30.8	

Little Thurrock Blackshots (2)
Party	Candidate	Votes	%	±%
Conservative	Joycelyn Redsell	1,008		
Conservative	Benjamin Maney	981		
Labour	David Gooding	481		
Labour	Robert Oliver	411		
Turnout		2,881	35.4	

Little Thurrock Rectory (2)
Party	Candidate	Votes	%	±%
Conservative	Nicholas Edwards	731		
Conservative	Pamela Pearse	687		
Labour	Valerie Cook	536		
Labour	Vincent Offord	531		
Turnout		2,485	31.8	

Ockendon (3)
Party	Candidate	Votes	%	±%
Conservative	Amanda Arnold	831		
Conservative	Darren Eva	789		
Labour	Barrie Lawrence	743		
Conservative	Jane Taylor	735		
Labour	Charles Curtis	725		
Labour	Michael Canavon	648		
Turnout		4,471	26.5	

Orsett (2)
Party	Candidate	Votes	%	±%
Conservative	Diane Revell	1,204		
Conservative	Michael Revell	1,129		
Labour	Michael Green	372		
Labour	Robert Moorman	367		
Turnout		3,072	39.9	

South Chafford (2)
Party	Candidate	Votes	%	±%
Conservative	Stephen Veryard	431		
Conservative	Babatunde Ojetola	321		
Labour	Victoria Healy	261		
Labour	Stuart McConnell	242		
Liberal Democrats	Adetokumboh Ogunfemi	221		
Liberal Democrats	Peter Saunders	204		
Turnout		1,680	24.4	

Stanford East & Corringham Town (3)
Party	Candidate	Votes	%	±%
Labour	Gordon Gambier	897		
Conservative	Hazel Daniels	881		
Labour	Phillip Smith	871		
Conservative	Kay Mangion	854		
Conservative	Pauline Tolson	827		
Labour	Graham Timms	788		
Turnout		5,118	30.8	

Stanford-le-Hope West (2)
Party	Candidate	Votes	%	±%
Conservative	Terence Hipsey	802		
Conservative	Emma Woods	721		
Labour	Alphonse Nuss	480		
Labour	Arthur Clarke	440		
Turnout		2,443	29.6	

Stifford Clays (2)
Party	Candidate	Votes	%	±%
Conservative	Leopoldo Milan-Vega	788		
Conservative	Maureen Pearce	756		
Labour	Gerard Rice	661		
Labour	Barbara Rice	645		
Turnout		2,850	33.5	

The Homesteads (3)
Party	Candidate	Votes	%	±%
Conservative	Suzanne MacPherson	1,082		
Conservative	Carl Mangion	1,012		
Conservative	John Everett	1,006		
Labour	Salvatore Benson	827		
Labour	Beverley Evans	810		
Labour	Anthony Sharp	778		
Turnout		5,515	32.1	

Tilbury Riverside & Thurrock Park (2)
Party	Candidate	Votes	%	±%
Labour	Kenneth Barrett	556		
Labour	June Brown	520		
Independent	Eunice Southam	374		
Independent	Malcolm Southam	353		
BNP	Gary Maffia	315		
Turnout		2,118	28.5	

Tilbury St. Chads (2)
Party	Candidate	Votes	%	±%
Labour	Valerie Liddiard	468		
Labour	Andrew Smith	451		
BNP	Mark Gorman	333		
Independent	Robert Gledhill	314		
Independent	Gina Edmead	272		
Turnout		1,838	27.5	

West Thurrock & South Stifford (3)
Party	Candidate	Votes	%	±%
Conservative	Gareth Davies	517		
Conservative	Georgette Polley	477		
Conservative	Edward McInally	469		
BNP	John Cotter	404		
Labour	Richard Price	404		
Labour	Bukky Okunade	397		
Labour	Clinton Sear	246		
Turnout		2,914	24.9	
