= 1990 Thurrock Borough Council election =

1990 English local election

← 1988	3 May 1990	1991 →

13 out of 39 seats to Thurrock Borough Council 20 seats needed for a majority
- Registered: 88,419
- Turnout: 38,916; 44.0% (▲10.1%)

	First party	Second party	Third party
Party	Labour	Conservative	Independent
Seats won	13	0	0
Seats after	31	7	1
Seat change	▲4	▼3	▼1
Popular vote	24,412	11,566	1,953
Percentage	62.7%	29.7%	5.0%
Swing	▲3.9%	▼10.3%	▲3.8%
- Winner of each seat at the 1990 Thurrock Borough Council election.
Council control before election
Labour
Council control after election
Labour

The 1990 Thurrock Borough Council election took place on 3 May 1990 to elect members of Thurrock Borough Council in Essex, England. This was on the same day as other local elections in England.

== Summary ==
=== Election results ===
1990 Thurrock Borough Council election
Party	This election			Full council			This election		
Party	Seats	Net	Seats %	Other	Total	Total %	Votes	Votes %	+/−
Labour	13	▲4	100.0	18	31	79.5	24,412	62.7	+3.9
Conservative	0	▼3	0.0	7	7	17.9	11,566	29.7	–10.3
Independent	0	▼1	0.0	1	1	2.6	1,953	5.0	+3.8
Green	0	Steady	0.0	0	0	0.0	985	2.5	N/A

== Ward results ==
=== Aveley ===
Aveley
Party	Candidate	Votes	%	±%
Labour	K. Evans*	1,399	49.8	–15.4
Independent	E. Vellacott	832	29.6	N/A
Conservative	H. Cook	576	20.5	–14.3
Majority		567	20.2	–10.1
Turnout		2,807	48.5	+14.3
Registered electors		5,784		
Labour hold				

=== Belhus ===
Belhus
Party	Candidate	Votes	%	±%
Labour	V. Bellinger*	1,753	76.4	+6.7
Conservative	S. Dalton	542	23.6	–6.7
Majority		1,211	52.8	+13.5
Turnout		2,295	40.3	+9.7
Registered electors		5,691		
Labour hold		Swing	▲6.7	

=== Chadwell St Mary ===
Chadwell St Mary
Party	Candidate	Votes	%	±%
Labour	M. Millane*	2,613	76.6	+7.5
Conservative	S. Andrews	797	23.4	–7.5
Majority		1,816	53.3	+15.1
Turnout		3,410	44.9	+12.8
Registered electors		7,587		
Labour hold		Swing	▲7.5	

=== Corringham & Fobbing ===
Corringham & Fobbing
Party	Candidate	Votes	%	±%
Labour	N. Barron*	2,322	58.7	+7.1
Conservative	R. Hunter	1,636	41.3	+4.9
Majority		686	17.3	N/A
Turnout		3,958	41.4	+11.3
Registered electors		9,541		
Labour hold		Swing	▲1.1	

=== Grays Thurrock (Town) ===
Grays Thurrock (Town)
Party	Candidate	Votes	%	±%
Labour	L. Groombridge*	1,857	60.8	+1.5
Conservative	J. Carter	832	27.3	–13.4
Green	C. Tripp	363	11.9	N/A
Majority		1,025	33.6	+15.0
Turnout		3,052	38.4	+7.3
Registered electors		7,949		
Labour hold		Swing	▲7.5	

=== Little Thurrock ===
Little Thurrock
Party	Candidate	Votes	%	±%
Labour	D. Gooding	1,920	47.9	+3.2
Conservative	D. Sutton	1,689	42.1	–13.2
Green	T. Sherlock	402	10.0	N/A
Majority		231	5.8	N/A
Turnout		4,011	47.2	+9.6
Registered electors		8,495		
Labour gain from Conservative		Swing	▲8.2	

=== Ockendon ===
Ockendon
Party	Candidate	Votes	%	±%
Labour	M. Aberdein*	1,980	72.6	+7.4
Conservative	F. Beasley	748	27.4	–7.4
Majority		1,232	45.2	+14.8
Turnout		2,728	42.9	+10.9
Registered electors		6,358		
Labour hold		Swing	▲7.4	

=== Orsett ===
Orsett
Party	Candidate	Votes	%	±%
Labour	R. Andrews*	1,140	58.4	+33.3
Conservative	A. Fish	592	30.3	–44.6
Green	A. Smith	220	11.3	N/A
Majority		548	28.1	N/A
Turnout		1,952	52.1	+10.1
Registered electors		3,741		
Labour gain from Conservative		Swing	▲39.0	

=== Stanford-le-Hope ===
Stanford-le-Hope
Party	Candidate	Votes	%	±%
Labour	D. Hunt*	2,279	66.0	+5.6
Conservative	M. Dalton	1,173	34.0	–5.6
Majority		1,106	32.0	+11.1
Turnout		3,452	43.8	+10.3
Registered electors		7,876		
Labour hold		Swing	▲5.6	

=== Stifford ===
Stifford
Party	Candidate	Votes	%	±%
Labour	A. Smith*	2,018	57.2	+4.4
Conservative	J. Everett	1,510	42.8	–4.4
Majority		508	14.4	+8.8
Turnout		3,528	55.4	+13.3
Registered electors		6,370		
Labour hold		Swing	▲4.4	

=== The Homesteads ===
The Homesteads
Party	Candidate	Votes	%	±%
Labour	L. Gillam	1,446	57.2	+9.8
Conservative	E. Aldwinckle	1,084	42.8	–9.8
Majority		362	14.3	N/A
Turnout		2,530	42.0	+3.9
Registered electors		6,021		
Labour gain from Conservative		Swing	▲9.8	

=== Tilbury ===
Tilbury
Party	Candidate	Votes	%	±%
Labour	G. Arnold*	2,555	79.2	–0.6
Conservative	M. Bamford-Burst	387	12.0	–8.2
Independent	J. Moore	284	8.8	N/A
Majority		2,168	67.2	+7.5
Turnout		3,226	38.5	+14.0
Registered electors		8,387		
Labour hold		Swing	▲3.8	

=== West Thurrock ===
West Thurrock
Party	Candidate	Votes	%	±%
Labour	G. Barton	1,130	57.4	+31.0
Independent	E. May*	837	42.6	–9.3
Majority		293	14.9	N/A
Turnout		1,967	42.6	+5.5
Registered electors		4,619		
Labour gain from Independent		Swing	▲20.2	
