= 1987 Thurrock Borough Council election =

1987 English local election

← 1986	7 May 1987	1988 →

13 out of 39 seats to Thurrock Borough Council 20 seats needed for a majority
- Registered: 88,268
- Turnout: 31,303; 35.5% (▲4.6%)

	First party	Second party	Third party
Party	Labour	Conservative	Independent Labour
Seats won	7	5	1
Seats after	28	9	2
Seat change	▼1	▲1	Steady
Popular vote	13,412	12,426	908
Percentage	42.8%	39.7%	2.9%
Swing	▼9.7%	▲7.3%	▼0.1%
- Winner of each seat at the 1987 Thurrock Borough Council election.
Council control before election
Labour
Council control after election
Labour

The 1987 Thurrock Borough Council election took place on 7 May 1987 to elect members of Thurrock Borough Council in Essex, England. This was on the same day as other local elections in England.

== Summary ==
=== Election results ===
1987 Thurrock Borough Council election
Party	This election			Full council			This election		
Party	Seats	Net	Seats %	Other	Total	Total %	Votes	Votes %	+/−
Labour	7	▼1	53.8	21	28	71.8	13,412	42.8	–9.7
Conservative	5	▲1	38.5	4	9	23.1	12,426	39.7	+7.3
Independent Labour	1	Steady	7.7	1	2	5.1	908	2.9	–0.1
Alliance	0	Steady	0.0	0	0	0.0	3,625	11.6	+4.3
Residents	0	Steady	0.0	0	0	0.0	689	2.2	–0.6
Independent	0	Steady	0.0	0	0	0.0	243	0.8	–1.2

== Ward results ==
=== Aveley ===
Aveley
Party	Candidate	Votes	%	±%
Labour	A. Geaney*	1,182	59.8	–8.0
Conservative	F. Beasley	796	40.2	+8.0
Majority		386	19.5	–16.0
Turnout		1,978	33.0	+0.6
Registered electors		6,068		
Labour hold		Swing	▼8.0	

=== Belhus ===
Belhus
Party	Candidate	Votes	%	±%
Labour	R. Fall*	1,100	66.1	–0.5
Conservative	M. Dalton	563	33.9	+13.5
Majority		537	32.3	–14.0
Turnout		1,663	29.0	–0.5
Registered electors		5,837		
Labour hold		Swing	▼7.0	

=== Chadwell St Mary ===
Chadwell St Mary
Party	Candidate	Votes	%	±%
Labour	M. Bidmead*	1,464	63.5	–13.7
Conservative	G. Law	840	36.5	+13.7
Majority		624	27.1	–27.4
Turnout		2,304	29.9	+4.9
Registered electors		7,832		
Labour hold		Swing	▼13.7	

=== Corringham & Fobbing ===
Corringham & Fobbing
Party	Candidate	Votes	%	±%
Conservative	J. Hubbard	1,315	39.4	+0.4
Labour	B. Pearson	1,065	31.9	–29.1
Alliance	E. McAllister	711	21.3	N/A
Independent	R. Chaplin	243	7.3	N/A
Majority		250	7.5	N/A
Turnout		3,334	35.4	+8.8
Registered electors		9,607		
Conservative gain from Labour		Swing	▲14.8	

=== Grays Thurrock (Town) ===
Grays Thurrock (Town)
Party	Candidate	Votes	%	±%
Labour	S. Josling*	1,126	39.4	–2.3
Conservative	T. Attewell	672	29.4	+10.3
Alliance	J. Scowen	487	21.3	N/A
Majority		454	19.9	–10.1
Turnout		2,285	33.0	+3.0
Registered electors		7,005		
Labour hold		Swing	▼6.3	

=== Little Thurrock ===
Little Thurrock
Party	Candidate	Votes	%	±%
Conservative	G. O'Brien	1,896	50.6	+7.9
Labour	C. Morris	1,262	33.7	–8.9
Alliance	A. Scott	592	15.8	+1.1
Majority		634	16.9	+16.8
Turnout		3,750	44.8	+7.6
Registered electors		8,491		
Conservative hold		Swing	▲8.4	

=== Ockendon ===
Ockendon
Party	Candidate	Votes	%	±%
Labour	A. Barnes*	1,108	47.7	–11.9
Conservative	G. Riches	614	26.4	+9.6
Alliance	P. Hackett	600	25.8	+2.2
Majority		494	21.3	–14.7
Turnout		2,322	35.6	+2.6
Registered electors		6,601		
Labour hold		Swing	▼10.8	

=== Orsett ===
Orsett
Party	Candidate	Votes	%	±%
Conservative	T. Lester	1,159	74.9	+7.1
Labour	B. Newsome	388	25.1	–7.1
Majority		771	49.8	+14.1
Turnout		1,547	42.0	+2.2
Registered electors		3,751		
Conservative hold		Swing	▲7.1	

=== Stanford-le-Hope ===
Stanford-le-Hope
Party	Candidate	Votes	%	±%
Labour	R. Harper	1,165	39.2	–25.8
Conservative	G. Wood	1,126	37.9	+2.9
Alliance	M. Thomas	681	22.9	N/A
Majority		39	1.3	–28.7
Turnout		2,972	37.5	+8.6
Registered electors		8,048		
Labour hold		Swing	▼14.4	

=== Stifford ===
Stifford
Party	Candidate	Votes	%	±%
Conservative	E. Beardwell	1,314	43.8	+8.9
Labour	J. Pollard	1,130	37.7	–11.5
Alliance	V. Yeates	554	18.5	+2.6
Majority		184	6.1	N/A
Turnout		2,998	47.6	+3.4
Registered electors		6,380		
Conservative hold		Swing	▲10.2	

=== The Homesteads ===
The Homesteads
Party	Candidate	Votes	%	±%
Conservative	L. Green	1,478	63.7	+3.5
Labour	G. Rice	843	36.3	N/A
Majority		635	27.4	+7.0
Turnout		2,321	40.2	+9.0
Registered electors		5,880		
Conservative hold				

=== Tilbury ===
Tilbury
Party	Candidate	Votes	%	±%
Labour	J. Dunn*	1,118	53.8	+1.9
Residents	S. Spriggs	689	33.1	–8.4
Conservative	M. Bamford-Burst	273	13.1	+6.5
Majority		429	20.6	+10.2
Turnout		2,080	26.4	+1.4
Registered electors		8,034		
Labour hold		Swing	▲5.2	

=== West Thurrock ===
West Thurrock
Party	Candidate	Votes	%	±%
Independent Labour	R. Howes*	908	51.9	+4.4
Labour	L. Clarke	461	26.4	–8.1
Conservative	R. Trangmar	380	21.7	+3.8
Majority		447	25.6	+12.6
Turnout		1,749	37.4	+7.1
Registered electors		4,734		
Independent Labour hold		Swing	▲6.3	
