= 1979 Thurrock Borough Council election =

English local election

← 1976	3 May 1979	1980 →

All 39 seats to Thurrock Borough Council 20 seats needed for a majority
- Registered: 91,737
- Turnout: ~74.6%

	First party	Second party	Third party
Party	Labour	Conservative	Independent
Seats won	18	15	3
Seat change	▼7	▲4	Steady
Popular vote	74,438	67,400	9,519
Percentage	45.9%	41.6%	5.9%
	Fourth party	Fifth party
Party	Independent Labour	Residents
Seats won	2	1
Seat change	▲2	▲1
Popular vote	2,539	2,997
Percentage	1.6%	1.8%
- Winner of each seat at the 1979 Thurrock Borough Council election.
Council control before election
Labour
Council control after election
No overall control

The 1979 Thurrock Borough Council election took place on 3 May 1979 to elect members of Thurrock Borough Council in Essex, England. This was on the same day as other local elections in England and the 1979 general election.

The whole council was up for election on new ward boundaries. Labour lost control of the council to No overall control.

== Summary ==
=== Election result ===
1979 Thurrock Borough Council election
Party	Candidates	Seats	Gains	Losses	Net gain/loss	Seats %	Votes %	Votes	+/−
Labour	39	18	1	6	▼7	46.2	45.9	74,438	
Conservative	39	15	4	1	▲4	38.5	41.6	67,400	
Independent	3	3	0	0	Steady	7.7	5.9	9,519	
Independent Labour	2	2	2	0	▲2	5.1	1.6	2,539	
Residents	2	1	0	0	▲1	2.6	1.8	2,997	
Liberal	10	0	0	0	Steady	0.0	3.2	5,180	

== Ward results ==
=== Aveley ===
Aveley (3 seats)
Party	Candidate	Votes	%	±%
Labour	A. Geaney*	2,155	60.4	–5.4
Labour	J. Clark	1,926	53.9	–5.1
Conservative	F. Beasley	1,882	52.7	+10.2
Labour	A. May*	1,654	46.3	–6.5
Conservative	J. Dobson	1,550	43.4	+2.0
Conservative	V. Lanigan	1,544	43.2	+4.8
Turnout		~4,541	74.4	+38.6
Registered electors		6,103		
Labour hold				
Labour hold				
Conservative gain from Labour				

=== Belhus ===
Belhus (3 seats)
Party	Candidate	Votes	%
Labour	P. Maynard*	2,330	68.5
Labour	S. Davis*	2,230	65.5
Labour	J. Aberdein*	2,075	61.0
Conservative	J. Brereton	1,302	38.3
Conservative	V. Dobson	1,195	35.1
Conservative	L. Swain	1,078	31.7
Turnout		~4,178	67.7
Registered electors		6,171	
Labour win (new seat)			
Labour win (new seat)			
Labour win (new seat)			

=== Chadwell St Mary ===
Chadwell St Mary (3 seats)
Party	Candidate	Votes	%	±%
Labour	A. Siddons*	2,951	64.5	+8.0
Labour	J. Taylor*	2,842	62.1	+13.7
Labour	P. Bolger*	2,808	61.4	+17.3
Conservative	P. Cleverley	1,603	35.0	+1.1
Conservative	J. Everett	1,527	33.4	+5.9
Conservative	J. Everett	1,390	30.4	+4.0
Liberal	M. Haynes	603	13.2	–4.0
Turnout		~5,622	75.4	+39.0
Registered electors		7,456		
Labour hold				
Labour hold				
Labour hold				

=== Corringham & Fobbing ===
Corringham & Fobbing (3 seats)
Party	Candidate	Votes	%
Labour	R. Wood*	3,345	53.2
Conservative	D. Hart*	3,340	53.1
Labour	A. Price	3,130	49.8
Conservative	D. Awcock	3,108	49.4
Labour	A. Clarke	3,030	48.2
Conservative	I. Harrison	2,920	46.4
Turnout		~6,965	76.5
Registered electors		9,105	
Labour win (new seat)			
Conservative win (new seat)			
Labour win (new seat)			

=== East Tilbury ===
East Tilbury
Party	Candidate	Votes	%
Residents	D. Allchin	1,384	44.7
Conservative	A. Hardy	997	32.2
Labour	E. Godley	716	23.1
Majority		387	12.5
Turnout		3,097	78.0
Registered electors		4,028	
Residents win (new seat)			

=== Grays Thurrock (North) ===
Grays Thurrock (North)
Party	Candidate	Votes	%
Conservative	M. Thomas	1,224	60.4
Labour	B. Newsome	804	39.6
Majority		420	20.7
Turnout		2,028	77.7
Registered electors		2,609	
Conservative win (new seat)			

=== Grays Thurrock (Town) ===
Grays Thurrock (Town) (3 seats)
Party	Candidate	Votes	%
Labour	S. Josling*	2,015	50.1
Labour	R. Pye*	2,000	49.8
Labour	K. Evans*	1,908	47.5
Residents	B. Taylor	1,613	40.1
Conservative	E. Attewell	1,312	32.7
Conservative	D. Sutton	1,280	31.9
Conservative	G. Riches	1,207	30.0
Liberal	P. Gillard	720	17.9
Turnout		~4,842	73.4
Registered electors		6,597	
Labour win (new seat)			
Labour win (new seat)			
Labour win (new seat)			

=== Little Thurrock ===
Little Thurrock (3 seats)
Party	Candidate	Votes	%	±%
Conservative	M. Andrews	3,242	65.0	+14.6
Conservative	A. Edwards*	3,081	61.8	+11.6
Conservative	J. Edwards*	3,078	61.7	+13.9
Labour	T. Codley	1,910	38.3	–4.3
Labour	B. Le Grys	1,862	37.4	–2.7
Labour	N. Hawes	1,781	35.7	–3.2
Turnout		~5,810	77.3	+28.3
Registered electors		7,516		
Conservative hold				
Conservative hold				
Conservative hold				

=== Ockendon ===
Ockendon (3 seats)
Party	Candidate	Votes	%
Labour	A. Barnes*	2,297	62.9
Labour	J. Mathison	2,166	59.3
Labour	R. Abel	2,152	58.9
Conservative	A. Bland	1,516	41.5
Conservative	C. Clark	1,436	39.3
Conservative	B. Lawrence	1,393	38.1
Turnout		~5,052	73.2
Registered electors		6,902	
Labour win (new seat)			
Labour win (new seat)			
Labour win (new seat)			

=== Orsett ===
Orsett (2 seats)
Party	Candidate	Votes	%	±%
Conservative	M. Greatrex*	1,742	71.1	–4.3
Conservative	B. Beardwell	1,739	71.0	–1.8
Labour	G. Miles	743	30.3	+1.8
Labour	Z. Chaudhri	675	27.6	–0.6
Turnout		~2,725	77.2	+30.1
Registered electors		3,530		
Conservative hold				
Conservative hold				

=== Stanford-le-Hope ===
Stanford-le-Hope (3 seats)
Party	Candidate	Votes	%	±%
Conservative	P. Butt	2,559	53.1	+9.2
Labour	F. Thompson	2,519	52.3	+10.2
Labour	M. Meen*	2,443	50.7	+13.3
Labour	J. Fuller	2,389	49.6	+12.5
Conservative	P. Povey*	2,281	47.3	+4.9
Conservative	A. McCartney	2,266	47.0	+5.8
Turnout		~5,661	75.2	+41.5
Registered electors		7,528		
Conservative hold				
Labour gain from Conservative				
Labour hold				

=== Stifford ===
Stifford (3 seats)
Party	Candidate	Votes	%	±%
Conservative	J. Greatrex	2,657	55.9	+8.2
Conservative	H. Lott	2,463	51.8	+7.2
Conservative	A. Turner	2,420	50.9	+8.5
Labour	P. Rice*	2,307	48.5	–8.8
Labour	G. Watts*	2,287	48.1	–6.2
Labour	A. Fitzmaurice*	2,131	44.8	–8.9
Turnout		~5,114	78.4	+33.7
Registered electors		6,523		
Conservative gain from Labour				
Conservative gain from Labour				
Conservative gain from Labour				

=== The Homesteads ===
The Homesteads (3 seats)
Party	Candidate	Votes	%
Conservative	M. Dalton	1,754	46.6
Conservative	L. Povey	1,672	44.4
Conservative	B. Fenner	1,661	44.1
Labour	D. Clarke	1,257	33.4
Labour	R. Clark	1,222	32.5
Labour	M. Bonfield	1,146	30.4
Liberal	C. Farrand	896	23.8
Liberal	G. Basson	868	23.1
Liberal	C. Bowler	820	21.8
Turnout		~4,217	78.1
Registered electors		5,399	
Conservative win (new seat)			
Conservative win (new seat)			
Conservative win (new seat)			

=== Tilbury ===
Tilbury (3 seats)
Party	Candidate	Votes	%	±%
Independent	M. Bibby*	3,646	72.7	+10.5
Independent	A. Bragg*	2,963	59.1	+3.8
Independent	T. Kendel*	2,910	58.0	+9.6
Labour	T. Lockwood	1,392	27.7	–15.1
Labour	T. O'Neill	1,319	26.3	–14.6
Labour	E. Rimmell	1,112	22.2	–16.4
Conservative	T. Lester	380	7.6	–4.2
Conservative	R. Windley	314	6.3	N/A
Liberal	M. Bamford	298	5.9	N/A
Conservative	D. Revell	288	5.7	N/A
Liberal	A. Maynard	230	4.6	N/A
Liberal	J. Maynard	199	4.0	N/A
Turnout		~5,665	68.3	+30.9
Registered electors		8,295		
Independent hold				
Independent hold				
Independent hold				

=== West Thurrock ===
West Thurrock (2 seats)
Party	Candidate	Votes	%
Independent Labour	E. Vellacott*	1,406	51.2
Independent Labour	E. May	1,133	41.3
Labour	L. Gay*	782	28.5
Labour	M. Epsley	627	22.8
Conservative	P. Budge	522	19.0
Conservative	M. Grant	477	17.4
Liberal	K. Crowson	300	10.9
Liberal	J. Norris	246	9.0
Turnout		~2,953	74.3
Registered electors		3,975	
Independent Labour gain from Labour			
Independent Labour gain from Labour			
