= 2010 Thurrock Council election =

2010 UK local government election

Results of the 2010 Thurrock Council election

The result of the 2010 Thurrock Council election (held on 6 May 2010) was that Thurrock Council stayed under no overall control. The Conservative Party gained two seats from Labour while Labour gained one seat from the Conservatives. Of the 16 wards contested, eight were won by the Conservatives and eight by Labour. The composition of the resulting council was:

- Conservatives 23
- Labour 22
- Independent 2
- British National Party 1
- Non Aligned 1

A few days after the election, Stuart St Clair-Haslam resigned the Conservative Party whip. Conservative councillor Ian Harrison also later resigned the Conservative whip, while Anne Cheale described herself as "non aligned". Following the election, John Kent (Labour) was elected council leader, defeating the former leader, Garry Hague (Conservative), by 25 votes to 23. Kent was supported by the Labour group, the two non-aligned councillors and the BNP councillor. This ended the Conservative administration that had been in power since 2004. At the same meeting, Anne Cheale was elected mayor. At this stage the party make-up was Labour 22 councillors, Conservatives 21, two East Tilbury Independents, three 'Thurrock Concerned Conservatives' and one British National Party councillor.

In November 2010 the BNP councillor resigned from the party to become a single Independent. In March 2011, Councillor St Clair-Haslam announced that he had joined the UKIP.
