= 1988 Thurrock Borough Council election =

1988 English local election

| ← 1987 | 5 May 1988 | 1990 → |

14 out of 39 seats to Thurrock Borough Council 20 seats needed for a majority
- Registered: 86,455
- Turnout: 29,280; 33.9% (▼1.6%)

| | First party | Second party | Third party |
|---|---|---|---|
| Party | Labour | Conservative | Independent Labour |
| Seats won | 12 | 2 | 0 |
| Seats after | 29 | 8 | 2 |
| Seat change | ▲1 | ▼1 | Steady |
| Popular vote | 18,894 | 12,850 | did not stand |
| Percentage | 58.8% | 40.0% | did not stand |
| Swing | ▲16.0% | ▲0.3% | ▼2.9% |
- Winner of each seat at the 1988 Thurrock Borough Council election.
Council control before election
Labour
Council control after election
Labour

The 1988 Thurrock Borough Council election took place on 5 May 1988 to elect members of Thurrock Borough Council in Essex, England. This was on the same day as other local elections in England.

== Summary ==
=== Election results ===
1988 Thurrock Borough Council election
| Party | This election | | | Full council | | | This election | | |
| Party | Seats | Net | Seats % | Other | Total | Total % | Votes | Votes % | +/− |
|---|---|---|---|---|---|---|---|---|---|
| Labour | 12 | ▲1 | 85.7 | 17 | 29 | 74.4 | 18,894 | 58.8 | +16.0 |
| Conservative | 2 | ▼1 | 14.3 | 6 | 8 | 20.5 | 12,850 | 40.0 | +0.3 |
| Independent Labour | 0 | Steady | 0.0 | 2 | 2 | 5.1 | N/A | N/A | –2.9 |
| Independent | 0 | Steady | 0.0 | 0 | 0 | 0.0 | 379 | 1.2 | +0.4 |

== Ward results ==
=== Aveley ===
Aveley
| Party | Candidate | Votes | % | ±% |
|---|---|---|---|---|
| Labour | R. Lee* | 1,321 | 65.2 | +5.4 |
| Conservative | F. Beasley | 706 | 34.8 | –5.4 |
| Majority | | 615 | 30.3 | +10.8 |
| Turnout | | 2,027 | 34.2 | +1.2 |
| Registered electors | | 5,933 | | |
| Labour hold | | Swing | ▲5.4 | |

=== Belhus ===
Belhus
| Party | Candidate | Votes | % | ±% |
|---|---|---|---|---|
| Labour | J. Aberdein* | 1,226 | 69.7 | +3.6 |
| Conservative | H. Cook | 534 | 30.3 | –3.6 |
| Majority | | 692 | 39.3 | +7.2 |
| Turnout | | 1,760 | 30.6 | +1.6 |
| Registered electors | | 5,748 | | |
| Labour hold | | Swing | ▲3.6 | |

=== Chadwell St Mary ===
Chadwell St Mary
| Party | Candidate | Votes | % | ±% |
|---|---|---|---|---|
| Labour | P. Rice* | 1,703 | 69.1 | +5.6 |
| Conservative | G. Law | 761 | 30.9 | –5.6 |
| Majority | | 942 | 38.2 | +11.1 |
| Turnout | | 2,464 | 32.1 | +2.2 |
| Registered electors | | 7,678 | | |
| Labour hold | | Swing | ▲5.6 | |

=== Coringham & Fobbing ===
Corringham & Fobbing (2 seats due to by-election)
| Party | Candidate | Votes | % |
|---|---|---|---|
| Labour | A. Price* | 1,621 | 57.1 |
| Labour | C. Morris | 1,442 | 50.8 |
| Conservative | I. Harrison | 1,144 | 40.3 |
| Conservative | R. Hunter | 1,096 | 38.6 |
| Independent | R. Chaplin | 379 | 13.3 |
| Turnout | | ~2,839 | 30.1 |
| Registered electors | | 9,433 | |
| Labour hold | | | |
| Labour gain from Conservative | | | |

=== East Tilbury ===
East Tilbury
| Party | Candidate | Votes | % | ±% |
|---|---|---|---|---|
| Labour | B. Palmer* | 1,153 | 60.3 | –9.9 |
| Conservative | J. Grozdenovic Kennedy | 758 | 39.7 | +9.9 |
| Majority | | 395 | 20.7 | –19.6 |
| Turnout | | 1,911 | 42.6 | +6.5 |
| Registered electors | | 4,484 | | |
| Labour hold | | Swing | ▼9.9 | |

=== Grays Thurrock (North) ===
Grays Thurrock (North)
| Party | Candidate | Votes | % | ±% |
|---|---|---|---|---|
| Labour | D. Hale | 691 | 54.3 | +14.1 |
| Conservative | L. Brown | 582 | 45.7 | +3.5 |
| Majority | | 109 | 8.6 | N/A |
| Turnout | | 1,273 | 43.6 | –0.8 |
| Registered electors | | 2,919 | | |
| Labour gain from Conservative | | Swing | ▲5.3 | |

=== Grays Thurrock (Town) ===
Grays Thurrock (Town)
| Party | Candidate | Votes | % | ±% |
|---|---|---|---|---|
| Labour | J. Pollard | 1,337 | 59.3 | +19.9 |
| Conservative | J. Carter | 917 | 40.7 | +11.3 |
| Majority | | 420 | 18.6 | –1.3 |
| Turnout | | 2,254 | 31.1 | –1.9 |
| Registered electors | | 7,241 | | |
| Labour hold | | Swing | ▲8.6 | |

=== Little Thurrock ===
Little Thurrock
| Party | Candidate | Votes | % | ±% |
|---|---|---|---|---|
| Conservative | A. Bennett* | 1,755 | 55.3 | +4.7 |
| Labour | B. Barton | 1,421 | 44.7 | +11.0 |
| Majority | | 334 | 10.5 | –6.4 |
| Turnout | | 3,176 | 37.6 | –7.2 |
| Registered electors | | 8,449 | | |
| Conservative hold | | Swing | ▼3.2 | |

=== Ockendon ===
Ockendon
| Party | Candidate | Votes | % | ±% |
|---|---|---|---|---|
| Labour | B. Lawrence | 1,354 | 65.2 | +17.5 |
| Conservative | A. Carter | 723 | 34.8 | +8.4 |
| Majority | | 631 | 30.4 | +9.1 |
| Turnout | | 2,077 | 32.0 | –3.6 |
| Registered electors | | 6,495 | | |
| Labour hold | | Swing | ▲4.6 | |

=== Stanford-le-Hope ===
Stanford-le-Hope
| Party | Candidate | Votes | % | ±% |
|---|---|---|---|---|
| Labour | M. Meen* | 1,593 | 60.4 | +21.2 |
| Conservative | G. Wood | 1,043 | 39.6 | +1.7 |
| Majority | | 550 | 20.9 | +19.6 |
| Turnout | | 2,636 | 33.5 | –4.0 |
| Registered electors | | 7,869 | | |
| Labour hold | | Swing | ▲9.8 | |

=== Stifford ===
Stifford
| Party | Candidate | Votes | % | ±% |
|---|---|---|---|---|
| Labour | D. Scully* | 1,400 | 52.8 | +15.1 |
| Conservative | M. Kingsland | 1,252 | 47.2 | +3.4 |
| Majority | | 148 | 5.6 | N/A |
| Turnout | | 2,652 | 42.1 | –5.5 |
| Registered electors | | 6,304 | | |
| Labour hold | | Swing | ▲5.9 | |

=== The Homesteads ===
The Homesteads
| Party | Candidate | Votes | % | ±% |
|---|---|---|---|---|
| Conservative | F. Mallon | 1,183 | 52.6 | –11.1 |
| Labour | A. Clarke* | 1,065 | 47.4 | +11.1 |
| Majority | | 118 | 5.2 | –22.2 |
| Turnout | | 2,248 | 38.1 | –2.1 |
| Registered electors | | 5,903 | | |
| Conservative gain from Labour | | Swing | ▼11.1 | |

=== Tilbury ===
Tilbury
| Party | Candidate | Votes | % | ±% |
|---|---|---|---|---|
| Labour | G. Watts* | 1,567 | 79.8 | +26.0 |
| Conservative | M. Bamford-Burst | 396 | 20.2 | +7.1 |
| Majority | | 1,171 | 59.7 | +39.1 |
| Turnout | | 1,963 | 24.5 | –1.9 |
| Registered electors | | 7,999 | | |
| Labour hold | | Swing | ▲9.5 | |
