= 2006 Thurrock Council election =

2006 UK local government election

Results of the 2006 Thurrock Council election

The 2006 Thurrock Council election took place on 4 May 2006 to elect members of Thurrock Council in Essex, England. One third of the council was up for election and the Conservative Party stayed in overall control of the council.

After the election, the composition of the council was:

- Conservative 26
- Labour 21
- Independent 2

== Election results ==
The results saw Labour gain one seat from the Conservatives in West Thurrock and South Stifford ward where the British National Party pushed the Conservatives into third place. However the Conservatives held the other 7 seats they were defending and as a result maintained an overall majority of 3 on the council.

Thurrock local election result 2006
Party	Seats	Gains	Losses	Net gain/loss	Seats %	Votes %	Votes	+/−
Labour	9	1	0	+1	56.3	35.9	10,365	-4.5
Conservative	7	0	1	-1	43.8	41.3	11,933	-5.8
BNP	0	0	0	0	0.0	12.0	3,476	+9.7
Liberal Democrats	0	0	0	0	0.0	7.1	2,049	+3.3
Independent	0	0	0	0	0.0	1.9	561	-4.0
Green	0	0	0	0	0.0	1.8	523	+1.3

== Ward results ==
Aveley & Uplands
Party	Candidate	Votes	%	±%
Conservative	Wendy Herd	941	51.6	
Labour	Martin Healy	509	27.9	
Green	Dean Hall	202	11.1	
Liberal Democrats	John Livermore	173	9.5	
Majority		432	23.7	
Turnout		1,825	28.8	−1.0
Conservative hold		Swing		

Belhus
Party	Candidate	Votes	%	±%
Labour	Peter Maynard	726	41.5	
BNP	John Cotter	524	30.0	
Conservative	Edward Woods	499	28.5	
Majority		202	11.5	
Turnout		1,749	26.6	+4.5
Labour hold		Swing		

Chadwell St. Mary
Party	Candidate	Votes	%	±%
Labour	Marion Canavon	928	38.5	
Conservative	Amanda Redsell	648	26.9	
BNP	Dave Strickson	598	24.8	
Liberal Democrats	Peter Saunders	237	9.8	
Majority		280	11.6	
Turnout		2,411	33.6	+8.8
Labour hold		Swing		

Grays Riverside
Party	Candidate	Votes	%	±%
Labour	Carl Morris	765	43.6	
Conservative	Allan Edwards	501	28.6	
BNP	Emma Colgate	487	27.8	
Majority		264	15.0	
Turnout		1,753	25.1	−2.5
Labour hold		Swing		

Grays Thurrock
Party	Candidate	Votes	%	±%
Labour	Peter Harris	987	42.0	
Conservative	Sharon Ponder	876	37.3	
BNP	Bryn Robinson	411	17.5	
Independent	Danbir Bhullar	77	3.3	
Majority		111	4.7	
Turnout		2,351	37.0	+6.2
Labour hold		Swing		

Little Thurrock Blackshots
Party	Candidate	Votes	%	±%
Conservative	Benjamin Maney	1,081	64.8	
Labour	Clinton Sear	363	21.8	
Liberal Democrats	David Coward	224	13.4	
Majority		718	43.0	
Turnout		1,668	37.7	+2.3
Conservative hold		Swing		

Little Thurrock Rectory
Party	Candidate	Votes	%	±%
Conservative	Robert Gledhill	978	68.3	
Labour	Gabriel Olufemi	454	31.7	
Majority		524	36.6	
Turnout		1,432	32.1	+0.3
Conservative hold		Swing		

Ockendon
Party	Candidate	Votes	%	±%
Labour	Barrie Lawrence	916	45.2	
Conservative	Susan Sibthorpe	791	39.0	
Green	Ian Burgess	321	15.8	
Majority		125	6.2	
Turnout		2,028	30.6	+4.1
Labour hold		Swing		

Orsett
Party	Candidate	Votes	%	±%
Conservative	Michael Revell	1,379	73.4	
Labour	Julian Norris	297	15.8	
Liberal Democrats	John Tunbridge	204	10.9	
Majority		1,082	57.6	
Turnout		1,880	44.3	+4.4
Conservative hold		Swing		

South Chafford
Party	Candidate	Votes	%	±%
Conservative	Babatunde Ojetola	539	46.4	
Liberal Democrats	Earnshaw Palmer	354	30.5	
Labour	Oliver Gerrish	268	23.1	
Majority		185	15.9	
Turnout		1,161	25.4	+1.0
Conservative hold		Swing		

Stanford East & Corringham Town
Party	Candidate	Votes	%	±%
Labour	Phillip Smith	939	40.2	
Conservative	Kay Mangion	847	36.3	
BNP	Christopher Roberts	548	23.5	
Majority		92	3.9	
Turnout		2,334	36.0	+5.2
Labour hold		Swing		

Stifford Clays
Party	Candidate	Votes	%	±%
Conservative	Maureen Pearce	829	43.2	
Labour	Gerard Rice	795	41.4	
Liberal Democrats	Derrick Harris	296	15.4	
Majority		34	1.8	
Turnout		1,920	40.9	+7.4
Conservative hold		Swing		

The Homesteads
Party	Candidate	Votes	%	±%
Conservative	John Everett	1,061	42.7	
Labour	Anthony Sharp	860	34.6	
Liberal Democrats	Paul Riley	561	22.6	
Majority		201	8.1	
Turnout		2,482	37.2	+5.1
Conservative hold		Swing		

Tilbury Riverside & Thurrock Park
Party	Candidate	Votes	%	±%
Labour	Bukky Okunade	392	36.6	
Independent	Malcolm Southam	345	32.2	
Conservative	Paul Coutts	335	31.3	
Majority		47	4.4	
Turnout		1,072	25.4	−3.1
Labour hold		Swing		

Tilbury St. Chads
Party	Candidate	Votes	%	±%
Labour	Richard Bingley	558	47.7	
BNP	Nicholas Geri	316	27.0	
Conservative	Lee Dove	157	13.4	
Independent	John-Paul Garner	139	11.9	
Majority		242	20.7	
Turnout		1,170	28.1	+0.6
Labour hold		Swing		

West Thurrock & South Stifford
Party	Candidate	Votes	%	±%
Labour	Andrew Smith	608	36.4	
BNP	Michael White	592	35.4	
Conservative	Stuart St.Clair-Haslam	471	28.2	
Majority		16	1.0	
Turnout		1,671	28.9	+4.0
Labour gain from Conservative		Swing		
