= 2011 Thurrock Council election =

2011 UK local government election

Thurrock Council election, 2011
- 5 May 2011

16 of the 49 seats to Thurrock Council 25 seats needed for a majority
	First party	Second party	Third party
Party	Labour	Conservative	Independent
Seats won	9	6	1
Seats after	24	22	3
Seat change	▲1	▼1	Steady
Popular vote	13,428	10,719	1,771
Percentage	41.0%	32.7%	5.4%
Swing	▲6.9%	▼10.6%	▲5.4%
- Results of the 2011 Thurrock Council election
Council control before election
No overall control
Council control after election
No overall control

On 5 May 2011, one-third of seats on Thurrock Council were contested. The result of the election was that Thurrock Council stayed under no overall control. The Labour Party gained one seat from the Conservative Party.

== Results summary ==
Of the 16 wards that were contested, nine were won by Labour, six by the Conservatives and one by an independent.

Thurrock local election result 2011
Party	Seats	Gains	Losses	Net gain/loss	Seats %	Votes %	Votes	+/−
Labour	9	1	0	+1	56.25	41.0	13,428	+6.9
Conservative	6	0	1	-1	37.5	32.7	10,719	-10.6
Independent	1	0	0	0	6.25	5.4	1,771	+5.4
UKIP	0	0	0	0	0.0	12.7	4,169	+12.7
BNP	0	0	0	0	0.0	4.2	1,368	-20.4
Liberal Democrats	0	0	0	0	0.0	3.7	1,203	+3.7
Green	0	0	0	0	0.0	0.2	62	+0.2

== Council Composition ==
After the election the composition of the council was:

↓
24	22	3
Labour	Conservative	Other

Following the election the vote for mayor was tied between Cllr Curtis and deputy mayor Cllr Tunde Ojetola. Outgoing Mayor Anne Cheale exercised her casting vote in favour of Councillor Curtis. In the election for council leader, Councillor Curtis then used his casting vote to elect John Kent as council leader, thus maintaining the Labour administration.

== Results by ward ==
Each of the 16 wards elected one councillor for this election. Incumbent councillors are marked by an asterisk.

=== Aveley & Uplands ===
Aveley & Uplands
Party	Candidate	Votes	%	±%
Conservative	Maureen Carol Pearce	626	27.9	−9.1
Independent	Colin James Churchman	551	24.5	N/A
UKIP	Tim Mark Aker	528	23.5	N/A
Labour	Clifford Holloway	497	22.1	−1.9
Liberal Democrats	John Livermore	45	2.0	−6.0
Majority		75	3.4	
Turnout		2,247	35.2	+7.2
Conservative hold		Swing		

=== Belhus ===
Belhus
Party	Candidate	Votes	%	±%
Labour	Charles John Curtis*	1,034	51.7	+15.7
Conservative	Rita Ajidagba	393	19.6	−14.9
UKIP	Stanley Christopher Baker	301	15.0	N/A
BNP	Susan Sibthorpe	219	11.0	−11.7
Liberal Democrats	Tracy Denise Rowe	55	2.7	−4.1
Majority		641	32.1	
Turnout		2,002	30.6	+3.5
Labour hold		Swing		

=== Chadwell St. Mary ===
Chadwell St. Mary
Party	Candidate	Votes	%	±%
Labour	Anthony William Fish	1,174	53.3	+10.0
Conservative	Lee Dove	523	23.7	+6.1
UKIP	James Nicholas Baker	262	11.9	N/A
BNP	Derek William Beackon	165	7.5	−25.3
Liberal Democrats	Natalie Butcher	80	3.6	−2.7
Majority		651	29.6	
Turnout		2,204	31.0	0
Labour hold		Swing		

=== Chafford & North Stifford ===
Chafford & North Stifford
Party	Candidate	Votes	%	±%
Conservative	Simon Ernest Wootton	857	55.2	+18.7
Labour	Augustine Nwanze	449	28.9	+13.8
Liberal Democrats	James Donald	127	8.2	−20.7
UKIP	Adrian Philip Short	120	7.7	+3.0
Majority		408	26.3	
Turnout		1,553	29.2	+0.5
Conservative hold		Swing		

=== Corringham & Fobbing ===
Corringham & Fobbing
Party	Candidate	Votes	%	±%
Conservative	Mark Steven Coxshall	909	46.6	+5.1
Labour	Robert Adam Fitch	666	34.1	+2.1
UKIP	Thomas Patrick Kelleher	290	14.8	N/A
Liberal Democrats	Kirsty Louise Beard	88	4.5	N/A
Majority		243	12.5	
Turnout		1,953	44.0	+4.3
Conservative hold		Swing		

=== East Tilbury ===
East Tilbury
Party	Candidate	Votes	%	±%
Independent	John Ronald Purkiss*	912	57.7	−8.6
Labour	Eleanor Lowe	303	19.2	+9.7
Conservative	Paul Polley	211	13.3	N/A
UKIP	Peter Michael Fox	100	6.3	N/A
Liberal Democrats	Luke Anthony Tyson	56	3.5	N/A
Majority		609	38.5	
Turnout		1,582	33.6	+2.8
Independent hold		Swing		

=== Grays Riverside ===
Grays Riverside
Party	Candidate	Votes	%	±%
Labour	Valerie Morris-Cook*	1,036	52.8	+9.1
Conservative	Dawn Evans	515	26.2	+5.5
BNP	Stephen Mark McNab	167	8.5	−17.2
UKIP	Jagdev Singh Bal	124	6.3	N/A
Liberal Democrats	Kevin Mulroue	121	6.2	−3.7
Majority		521	26.6	
Turnout		1,963	27.2	+4.0
Labour hold		Swing		

=== Grays Thurrock ===
Grays Thurrock
Party	Candidate	Votes	%	±%
Labour	Catherine Angela Kent*	1,193	52.8	+4.3
Conservative	Tracy Geraldine Barnes	584	25.8	−1.9
BNP	Thomas Richard Davis	200	8.9	−15.9
UKIP	Rajnikant Mistry	186	8.2	N/A
Liberal Democrats	William Andrew Jackson	97	4.3	N/A
Majority		609	27.0	
Turnout		2,260	36.1	+2.5
Labour hold		Swing		

=== Little Thurrock Rectory ===
Little Thurrock Rectory
Party	Candidate	Votes	%	±%
Conservative	Thomas Anthony Kelly	852	46.9	+8.6
Labour	Eileen O'Reilly	693	38.2	+9.1
UKIP	Alan David Broad	214	11.8	N/A
Liberal Democrats	Matthew James Orbell	56	3.1	−8.0
Majority		159	8.7	
Turnout		1,815	40.4	+7.7
Conservative hold		Swing		

=== Ockendon ===
Ockendon
Party	Candidate	Votes	%	±%
Labour	Aaron Kiely	1,096	41.6	+7.5
Conservative	Barry William Johnson*	1,009	38.3	3.5
BNP	Karne Thomas McGinn	231	8.8	−11.9
UKIP	Jill Heather Broad	223	8.5	−1.9
Liberal Democrats	David Paul Shirley	73	2.8	N/A
Majority		87	3.3	
Turnout		2,632	38.9	+7.8
Labour gain from Conservative		Swing		

=== Stanford East & Corringham Town ===
Stanford East & Corringham Town
Party	Candidate	Votes	%	±%
Labour	Philip George Smith	1,104	42.0	+4.3
Conservative	Natalie Jay Gannon Quirk	968	36.8	+1.6
UKIP	Roy Robert Jones	487	18.5	N/A
Liberal Democrats	Adrian Leslie Stevart	70	2.7	N/A
Majority		136	5.2	
Turnout		2,629	40.9	+4.1
Labour hold		Swing		

=== Stanford-Le-Hope West ===
Stanford-Le-Hope West
Party	Candidate	Votes	%	±%
Conservative	Shane Steven Hebb	720	39.6	−0.1
Labour	Gemma Robbins	653	35.9	+8.2
UKIP	Stuart St.Clair-Haslam	374	20.5	+5.9
Liberal Democrats	Christopher Greenaway	73	4.0	N/A
Majority		67	3.7	
Turnout		1,820	39.1	+7.9
Conservative hold		Swing		

=== Stifford Clays ===
Stifford Clays
Party	Candidate	Votes	%	±%
Labour	Diana Elizabeth Hale*	877	45.1	+3.4
Conservative	Johanna Catherine Morris	523	26.9	−7.7
UKIP	Clive Herbert Broad	475	24.5	N/A
Liberal Democrats	Claire Jones	68	3.5	N/A
Majority		354	18.2	
Turnout		1,943	40.4	+2.1
Labour hold		Swing		

=== The Homesteads ===
The Homesteads
Party	Candidate	Votes	%	±%
Conservative	Pauline Maria Tolson*	1,298	43.2	−7.7
Labour	Richard Speight	1,055	35.1	+3.4
UKIP	Peter Geoffrey Henry Prendergast	485	16.1	N/A
Liberal Democrats	Alan Maylin	107	3.5	N/A
Green	Simon John Barnes	62	2.1	N/A
Majority		243	8.1	
Turnout		3,007	45.5	+6.5
Conservative hold		Swing		

=== Tilbury Riverside & Thurrock Park ===
Tilbury Riverside & Thurrock Park
Party	Candidate	Votes	%	±%
Labour	Clare Esther Baldwin	647	49.7	+15.8
Independent	Keith John Hatcher	308	23.7	N/A
BNP	Michael Edward Braun	193	14.8	−15.4
Conservative	Georgette Polley	153	11.8	−0.3
Majority		339	26.0	
Turnout		1,301	30.3	+5.3
Labour hold		Swing		

=== West Thurrock & South Stifford ===
West Thurrock & South Stifford
Party	Candidate	Votes	%	±%
Labour	Victoria Holloway	951	52.6	+10.7
Conservative	Benjamin Robert Gadsby	578	31.9	+3.4
BNP	Warren Michael Parish	193	10.7	−18.9
Liberal Democrats	Daniel Allen	87	4.8	N/A
Majority		373	20.7	
Turnout		1,809	28.5	+5.3
Labour hold		Swing		

== See also ==
- Politics of the United Kingdom
