= 2012 Thurrock Council election =

Borough council election

Thurrock Council election, 2012
- 3 May 2012

17 of the 49 seats to Thurrock Council 25 seats needed for a majority
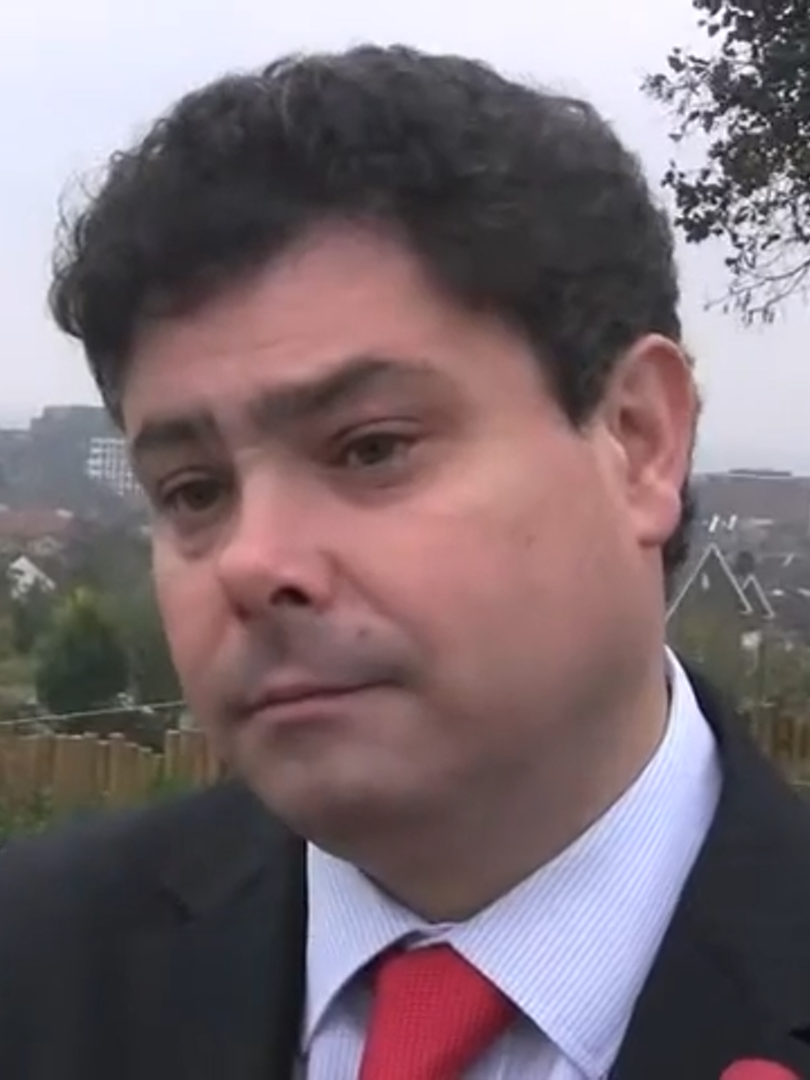

	First party	Second party	Third party
Leader	John Kent	Phil Anderson	Robert Ray
Party	Labour	Conservative	UKIP
Seats won	8	7	1
Seats after	25	21	1
Seat change	▲1	▼1	▲1
	Fourth party
Leader	Barry Palmer
Party	Independent
Seats won	1
Seats after	2
Seat change	▼1
- Results of the 2012 Thurrock Council election
Council control before election
No overall control
Council control after election
Labour

The 2012 Thurrock Council election took place on 3 May 2012 to elect members of Thurrock Borough Council in England. This was on the same day as other 2012 United Kingdom local elections.

The result was:

- Labour 25 (+1) (39% of vote)
- Conservative 21 (-1) (30%)
- Independent 2 ( 7%)
- UKIP 1 (+1) (18%)
- LibDem 0 ( 4%)
- other 0 ( 2%)
- vacant 0 (-1)

The Labour Party took overall control (previously NOC with Labour administration).
