= 1984 Thurrock Borough Council election =

1984 English local election

- 3 May 1984

16 out of 39 seats to Thurrock Borough Council 20 seats needed for a majority
- Registered: 86,378
- Turnout: 25,552; 29.6% (▼0.3%)

	First party	Second party	Third party
Party	Labour	Conservative	Independent Labour
Seats won	12	4	0
Seats after	27	10	2
Seat change	▲3	Steady	Steady
Popular vote	17,079	10,915	did not stand
Percentage	53.5%	34.2%	did not stand
Swing	▲2.7%	▼1.5%	▼2.8%
	Fourth party	Fifth party
Party	Independent	Residents
Seats won	0	0
Seats after	0	0
Seat change	▼2	▼1
Popular vote	1,906	did not stand
Percentage	6.0%	did not stand
Swing	▲3.2%	N/A
- Winner of each seat at the 1984 Thurrock Borough Council election.
Council control before election
Labour
Council control after election
Labour

The 1984 Thurrock Borough Council election took place on 3 May 1984 to elect members of Thurrock Borough Council in Essex, England. This was on the same day as other local elections in England.

== Summary ==
=== Election result ===
1984 Thurrock Borough Council election
Party	This election				Full council			This election		
Party	Candidates	Seats	Net	Seats %	Other	Total	Total %	Votes	Votes %	+/−
Labour	{{{candidates}}}	12	▲3	75.0	15	27	69.2	17,079	53.5	+2.7
Conservative	{{{candidates}}}	4	Steady	25.0	6	10	25.6	10,915	34.2	–1.5
Independent Labour	{{{candidates}}}	0	Steady	0.0	2	2	5.1	N/A	N/A	–2.8
Independent	{{{candidates}}}	0	▼2	0.0	0	0	0.0	1,906	6.0	+3.2
Alliance	{{{candidates}}}	0	Steady	0.0	0	0	0.0	1,898	5.9	–2.0
Communist	{{{candidates}}}	0	Steady	0.0	0	0	0.0	138	0.4	N/A
Residents	{{{candidates}}}	0	▼1	0.0	0	0	0.0	N/A	N/A	N/A

== Ward results ==
=== Aveley ===
Aveley
Party	Candidate	Votes	%	±%
Labour	R. Lee	1,053	61.6	–6.5
Conservative	F. Beasley	493	28.8	–3.1
Alliance	J. Norris	163	9.5	N/A
Majority		560	32.8	–3.5
Turnout		1,709	28.9	–2.0
Registered electors		5,997		
Labour hold		Swing	▼1.7	

=== Belhus ===
Belhus
Party	Candidate	Votes	%	±%
Labour	J. Aberdein*	1,137	77.9	+1.0
Conservative	C. Clark	322	22.1	–1.0
Majority		815	55.9	+2.0
Turnout		1,459	24.2	–3.6
Registered electors		6,125		
Labour hold		Swing	▲1.0	

=== Chadwell St Mary ===
Chadwell St Mary
Party	Candidate	Votes	%	±%
Labour	P. Rice	1,218	55.9	+7.2
Independent	D. Hemmings*	587	26.9	+6.2
Conservative	V. Lanigan	256	11.7	–4.9
Alliance	A. Scott	119	5.5	N/A
Majority		631	28.9	+1.0
Turnout		2,180	27.1	–6.2
Registered electors		7,985		
Labour gain from Independent		Swing	▲0.5	

=== Corringham & Fobbing ===
Corringham & Fobbing (2 seats due to by-election)
Party	Candidate	Votes	%
Labour	A. Price*	1,465	63.3
Labour	L. Boot	1,382	59.7
Conservative	J. Hubbard	923	39.9
Conservative	A. Whear	857	37.0
Turnout		~2,356	24.8
Registered electors		9,499	
Labour hold			
Labour hold			

=== East Tilbury ===
East Tilbury
Party	Candidate	Votes	%	±%
Labour	B. Palmer	1,075	70.2	+44.6
Conservative	A. Grant	457	29.8	+15.1
Majority		618	40.3	N/A
Turnout		1,532	36.1	+3.5
Registered electors		4,271		
Labour gain from Residents		Swing	▲15.8	

=== Grays Thurrock (North) ===
Grays Thurrock (North)
Party	Candidate	Votes	%	±%
Conservative	C. Hammett	534	42.2	–18.3
Labour	C. Olivier	509	40.2	+0.7
Alliance	A. Senior	222	17.5	N/A
Majority		25	2.0	–19.0
Turnout		1,265	44.4	+0.5
Registered electors		2,892		
Conservative hold		Swing	▼9.5	

=== Grays Thurrock (Town) ===
Grays Thurrock (Town)
Party	Candidate	Votes	%	±%
Labour	N. Paul	830	38.5	–29.5
Independent	B. Taylor	714	33.1	N/A
Conservative	E. Attewell	389	18.1	–13.9
Alliance	P. Gray	142	6.6	N/A
Communist	J. Paul	79	3.7	N/A
Majority		116	5.4	–30.7
Turnout		2,154	32.6	–1.5
Registered electors		6,675		
Labour hold				

=== Little Thurrock ===
Little Thurrock (2 seats due to by-election)
Party	Candidate	Votes	%
Conservative	A. Bennett	1,146	50.7
Conservative	P. Cleverly	1,093	48.3
Labour	J. Osman	751	33.2
Labour	L. Groombridge	687	30.4
Alliance	D. Benson	467	20.6
Alliance	G. Rice	380	16.8
Turnout		~2,293	28.8
Registered electors		7,963	
Conservative hold			
Conservative hold			

=== Ockendon ===
Ockendon
Party	Candidate	Votes	%	±%
Labour	A. Borge	1,208	68.4	+0.3
Conservative	J. Stone	500	28.3	–3.6
Communist	J. Walker	59	3.3	N/A
Majority		708	40.1	+3.9
Turnout		1,767	26.6	–5.0
Registered electors		6,720		
Labour hold		Swing	▲2.0	

=== Stanford-le-Hope ===
Stanford-le-Hope
Party	Candidate	Votes	%	±%
Labour	M. Meen*	1,405	64.1	+21.8
Conservative	G. Wood	788	35.9	+1.5
Majority		617	28.1	+20.2
Turnout		2,193	28.4	–9.3
Registered electors		7,857		
Labour hold		Swing	▲10.2	

=== Stifford ===
Stifford (2 seats due to by-election)
Party	Candidate	Votes	%
Labour	D. Scully	1,247	49.1
Conservative	E. Beardwell	1,195	47.0
Labour	M. Doyle	1,187	46.7
Conservative	M. Luff	1,169	46.0
Alliance	E. Ward	284	11.2
Turnout		~3,200	48.9
Registered electors		6,544	
Labour gain from Conservative			
Conservative hold			

=== The Homesteads ===
The Homesteads
Party	Candidate	Votes	%	±%
Labour	A. Clarke*	1,067	60.8	+30.1
Conservative	D. Connelly	689	39.2	–7.6
Majority		378	21.5	N/A
Turnout		1,756	31.0	–8.3
Registered electors		5,744		
Labour hold		Swing	▲18.9	

=== Tilbury ===
Tilbury
Party	Candidate	Votes	%	±%
Labour	G. Watts	858	50.8	–27.7
Independent	C. Spriggs	605	35.8	N/A
Alliance	M. Bamford	121	7.2	–14.3
Conservative	W. McLaughlin	104	6.2	N/A
Majority		253	15.0	–42.0
Turnout		1,688	21.1	–5.3
Registered electors		8,106		
Labour gain from Independent				
