= 2008 Thurrock Council election =

2008 UK local government election

Results of the 2008 Thurrock Council election

The 2008 Thurrock Council election took place on 1 May 2008 to elect members of Thurrock Council in Essex, England. One third of the council was up for election and the council stayed under no overall control.

After the election, the composition of the council was

- Conservative 24
- Labour 22
- Independent 2
- British National Party 1

== Campaign ==
The 2008 election in Thurrock was seen as one of the key national contests with the Conservatives needing to gain one seat to take overall control. Important issues in the election included recycling, local bus services and race relations.

18 seats were contested in the election with the Tilbury Riverside and Thurrock Park seat being a by-election after the previous councillor resigned. The Conservatives, Labour and British National Party contested all 18 seats except in East Tilbury where the Conservatives did not put up a candidate. There were also 8 Liberal Democrats and 2 other candidates.

== Election results ==
The results saw the council stay under no overall control but with the British National Party gaining a seat. The Conservatives remained the largest party on the council after winning 10 of the seats contested as compared to 6 for Labour. The final seat was won by independent Barry Palmer in East Tilbury.

While the Conservatives were still just short of an overall majority they remained in control of the council due to their existing agreement with the 2 independent councillors. Both main parties said they would not work with the new British National Party councillor, although she said she did not want to work with them anyway.

Following the election in March 2009, Terry Hipsey, the then Conservative leader of the council, defected from the Conservatives to Labour, leaving each of the major parties with 23 councillors.

Thurrock local election result 2008
Party	Seats	Gains	Losses	Net gain/loss	Seats %	Votes %	Votes	+/−
Conservative	10	1	1	0	55.6	37.2	11,900	+6.5%
Labour	6	2	2	0	33.3	32.6	10,416	-1.5%
BNP	1	1	0	+1	5.6	21.3	6,827	-3.3%
Independent	1	0	0	0	5.6	3.5	1,115	-0.7%
Liberal Democrats	0	0	0	0	0	4.0	1,265	+0.0%
UKIP	0	0	0	0	0	1.2	372	-0.5%
Ind. Working Class	0	0	0	0	0	0.3	98	-0.2%
Independent Socialist	0	0	1	-1	0	0	0	0

== Ward results ==
Aveley & Uplands
Party	Candidate	Votes	%	±%
Conservative	Amanda Wilton	845	45.5	+8.5
BNP	Dave Strickson	521	28.1	−2.9
Labour	John Garner	363	19.5	−4.5
Liberal Democrats	John Livermore	128	6.9	−1.1
Majority		324	17.4	+11.4
Turnout		1,857	29.0	+1.0
Conservative hold		Swing		

Belhus
Party	Candidate	Votes	%	±%
Labour	Sue Gray	786	42.8	+6.8
Conservative	Georgette Polley	549	29.9	−4.6
BNP	Lauren Kay	387	21.1	−1.6
Liberal Democrats	John Biddall	115	6.3	−0.5
Majority		237	12.9	+11.4
Turnout		1,837	28.6	+1.5
Labour hold		Swing		

Chadwell St. Mary
Party	Candidate	Votes	%	±%
Labour	Gerard Rice	925	42.0	−1.3
BNP	Bryn Robinson	645	29.3	−3.5
Conservative	Amanda Redsell	515	23.4	+5.8
Liberal Democrats	Peter Saunders	119	5.4	−0.9
Majority		280	12.7	+2.2
Turnout		2,204	30.7	−0.3
Labour hold		Swing		

Chafford & North Stifford
Party	Candidate	Votes	%	±%
Conservative	Garry Hague	866	52.6	+16.1
Liberal Democrats	Earnshaw Palmer	390	23.7	−5.2
BNP	Sandra Strickson	201	12.2	−2.6
Labour	Martin Healy	188	11.4	−3.7
Majority		476	28.9	+21.3
Turnout		1,645	31.1	+2.4
Conservative hold		Swing		

Corringham & Fobbing
Party	Candidate	Votes	%	±%
Conservative	Ian Harrison	837	49.2	+7.7
Labour	John Cecil	560	32.9	+0.9
BNP	Warren Parish	303	17.8	−8.7
Majority		277	16.3	+6.8
Turnout		1,700	38.2	−1.5
Conservative hold		Swing		

East Tilbury
Party	Candidate	Votes	%	±%
Independent	Barry Palmer	923	64.6	−1.7
BNP	Bradley Elvin	286	20.0	−4.2
Labour	Felton Flavius	220	15.4	+5.9
Majority		637	44.6	+2.5
Turnout		1,429	31.0	+0.2
Independent hold		Swing		

Grays Riverside
Party	Candidate	Votes	%	±%
Labour	John Kent	720	41.8	−1.9
Conservative	Paul Coutts	473	27.5	+6.8
BNP	Jamie Strickson	398	23.1	−2.6
Liberal Democrats	Claire Jones	130	7.6	−2.3
Majority		247	14.3	−3.7
Turnout		1,721	23.8	+0.6
Labour hold		Swing		

Grays Thurrock
Party	Candidate	Votes	%	±%
Labour	Yash Gupta	1,011	47.3	−1.2
Conservative	Leo Milan-Vega	555	25.9	−0.8
BNP	Ricky-Lee Strickson	445	20.8	−4.0
Liberal Democrats	William Jackson	128	6.0	+6.0
Majority		456	21.4	−0.4
Turnout		2,139	33.9	−0.3
Labour hold		Swing		

Little Thurrock Blackshots
Party	Candidate	Votes	%	±%
Conservative	Joycelyn Redsell	735	46.8	−18.0
Labour	Bob Moorman	279	17.8	−4.0
BNP	Dean Kay	243	15.5	+15.5
UKIP	Alan Broad	207	13.2	+13.2
Liberal Democrats	Thomas Kelly	106	6.8	−6.6
Majority		456	29.0	−14.0
Turnout		1,570	35.0	−2.7
Conservative hold		Swing		

Ockendon
Party	Candidate	Votes	%	±%
Conservative	Amanda Arnold	1,016	45.3	+10.5
Labour	Wendy Curtis	806	35.9	+1.8
BNP	Sophie Agass	422	18.8	−1.9
Majority		210	9.4	+8.7
Turnout		2,244	33.9	+2.8
Conservative hold		Swing		

Orsett
Party	Candidate	Votes	%	±%
Conservative	Diane Revell	1,103	59.5	−13.9
Labour	Angela Gaywood	420	22.7	+6.9
BNP	Derek Beackon	330	17.8	+17.8
Majority		683	36.8	−20.8
Turnout		1,853	40.0	−4.3
Conservative hold		Swing		

South Chafford
Party	Candidate	Votes	%	±%
Conservative	Stephen Veryard	547	55.0	+8.6
Labour	David Hooper	188	18.9	−4.2
Liberal Democrats	Adedoyin Ogunfemi	149	15.0	−15.5
BNP	Donna Strickson	111	11.2	+11.2
Majority		359	36.1	+20.2
Turnout		995	21.5	−3.9
Conservative hold		Swing		

Stanford East & Corringham Town
Party	Candidate	Votes	%	±%
Conservative	Danny Nicklen	1,069	43.5	+8.3
Labour	Gordon Gambier	949	38.6	+0.9
BNP	Danny Brown	344	14.0	−7.1
Ind. Working Class	Dave Amis	98	4.0	−2.0
Majority		120	4.9	
Turnout		2,460	38.0	+1.2
Conservative gain from Labour		Swing		

Stanford-Le-Hope West
Party	Candidate	Votes	%	±%
Conservative	Terry Hipsey	718	44.7	+5.0
Labour	Anita Nuss	450	28.0	+0.3
BNP	Anita Jessup	275	17.1	−0.9
UKIP	Clive Broad	165	10.3	−4.3
Majority		268	16.7	+4.7
Turnout		1,608	33.9	+2.7
Conservative hold		Swing		

The Homesteads
Party	Candidate	Votes	%	±%
Conservative	Suzanne MacPherson	1,203	45.5	+4.2
Labour	Anthony Sharp	901	34.1	+0.4
BNP	Paul Woodley	542	20.5	−4.5
Majority		302	11.4	+3.8
Turnout		2,646	39.5	+0.5
Conservative hold		Swing		

Tilbury Riverside & Thurrock Park
Party	Candidate	Votes	%	±%
BNP	Emma Colgate	530	39.9	+9.7
Labour	Paul Martin	463	34.8	+0.9
Independent	June Brown	192	14.4	−9.4
Conservative	Lee Dove	144	10.8	−1.3
Majority		67	5.1	
Turnout		1,329	30.9	+5.9
BNP gain from Labour		Swing		

Tilbury St. Chads
Party	Candidate	Votes	%	±%
Labour	Lynn Worrall	519	46.5	−1.2
BNP	Angela Daly	458	41.0	+14.0
Conservative	Kay Mangion	139	12.5	−0.9
Majority		61	5.5	−15.2
Turnout		1,116	27.8	−0.3
Labour gain from Independent		Swing		

West Thurrock & South Stifford
Party	Candidate	Votes	%	±%
Labour	Oliver Gerrish	668	40.7	−1.2
Conservative	Gareth Davies	586	35.7	+7.2
BNP	Ken Daly	386	23.5	−6.1
Majority		82	5.0	−7.3
Turnout		1,640	25.9	−0.7
Labour gain from Conservative		Swing		
