= 1983 Thurrock Borough Council election =

1983 English local election

- 5 May 1983

14 out of 39 seats to Thurrock Borough Council 20 seats needed for a majority

	First party	Second party	Third party
Party	Labour	Conservative	Independent Labour
Seats won	8	5	1
Seats after	23	10	2
Seat change	▲1	Steady	Steady
Popular vote	16,382	11,510	915
Percentage	50.8%	35.7%	2.8%
Swing	▲6.0%	▲3.4%	0.0%
	Fourth party	Fifth party	Sixth party
Party	Independent	Alliance	Residents
Seats won	0	0	0
Seats after	2	1	1
Seat change	▼1	Steady	Steady
Popular vote	906	2,548	did not stand
Percentage	2.8%	7.9%	did not stand
Swing	▼1.5%	▼4.1%	▼3.1%
- Winner of each seat at the 1983 Thurrock Borough Council election.
Council control before election
Labour
Council control after election
Labour

The 1983 Thurrock Borough Council election took place on 5 May 1983 to elect members of Thurrock Borough Council in Essex, England. This was on the same day as other local elections in England.

== Summary ==
=== Election result ===
1983 Thurrock Borough Council election
Party	This election				Full council			This election		
Party	Candidates	Seats	Net	Seats %	Other	Total	Total %	Votes	Votes %	+/−
Labour	{{{candidates}}}	8	▲1	57.1	15	23	59.0	16,382	50.8	+6.0
Conservative	{{{candidates}}}	5	Steady	35.7	5	10	25.6	11,510	35.7	+3.4
Independent Labour	{{{candidates}}}	1	Steady	7.1	1	2	5.1	915	2.8	±0.0
Independent	{{{candidates}}}	0	▼1	0.0	2	2	5.1	906	2.8	–1.5
Alliance	{{{candidates}}}	0	Steady	0.0	1	1	2.6	2,548	7.9	–4.1
Residents	{{{candidates}}}	0	Steady	0.0	1	1	2.6	N/A	N/A	–3.1

== Ward results ==
Seat changes are compared to the last election when that specific seat was up for election and does not take into account by-elections or defections.

=== Aveley ===
Aveley
Party	Candidate	Votes	%	±%
Labour	A. Geaney*	1,274	68.1	+15.9
Conservative	F. Beasley	596	31.9	+0.8
Majority		678	36.3	+15.1
Turnout		1,870	30.9	+3.0
Registered electors		6,052		
Labour hold		Swing	▲7.6	

=== Belhus ===
Belhus
Party	Candidate	Votes	%	±%
Labour	R. Fall	1,300	76.9	+3.9
Conservative	C. Clark	391	23.1	–3.9
Majority		909	53.8	+7.8
Turnout		1,691	27.8	+4.1
Registered electors		6,083		
Labour hold		Swing	▲3.9	

=== Chadwell St Mary ===
Chadwell St Mary
Party	Candidate	Votes	%	±%
Labour	C. Bidmead	1,273	48.7	–3.3
Independent	R. Hill	541	20.7	–1.0
Conservative	G. Law	433	16.6	+3.0
Independent	J. Taylor	365	14.0	N/A
Majority		732	28.0	–2.3
Turnout		2,612	33.3	+2.9
Registered electors		7,844		
Labour hold		Swing	▼1.2	

=== Corringham & Fobbing ===
Corringham & Fobbing
Party	Candidate	Votes	%	±%
Labour	R. Wood*	1,965	61.9	+6.5
Conservative	P. Campbell	1,212	38.1	–6.5
Majority		693	23.7	+12.9
Turnout		3,177	34.5	+3.9
Registered electors		9,209		
Labour hold		Swing	▲6.5	

=== Grays Thurrock (Town) ===
Grays Thurrock (Town)
Party	Candidate	Votes	%	±%
Labour	S. Josling*	1,539	68.0	+28.0
Conservative	E. Attewell	723	32.0	+13.0
Majority		816	36.1	+29.4
Turnout		2,262	34.1	–2.4
Registered electors		6,633		
Labour hold		Swing	▲7.5	

=== Little Thurrock ===
Little Thurrock (2 seats due to by-election)
Party	Candidate	Votes	%
Conservative	R. Kirk	1,469	57.1
Conservative	P. Butt	1,264	49.2
Labour	J. Osman	909	35.4
Labour	P. Mitchell	891	34.7
Alliance	G. Rice	608	23.7
Turnout		3,210	40.7
Registered electors		7,888	
Conservative hold			
Conservative hold			

=== Ockendon ===
Ockendon
Party	Candidate	Votes	%	±%
Labour	A. Barnes*	1,429	68.1	+2.9
Conservative	J. Stone	669	31.9	–2.9
Majority		760	36.2	+5.8
Turnout		2,098	31.6	–2.1
Registered electors		6,639		
Labour hold		Swing	▲2.9	

=== Orsett ===
Orsett
Party	Candidate	Votes	%	±%
Conservative	M. Greatrex*	1,110	71.2	–2.8
Labour	A. Cowdery	448	28.8	+2.8
Majority		662	42.5	–5.6
Turnout		1,558	42.3	+5.6
Registered electors		3,683		
Conservative hold		Swing	▼2.8	

=== Stanford-le-Hope ===
Stanford-le-Hope
Party	Candidate	Votes	%	±%
Labour	R. Goldsmith	1,227	42.3	N/A
Conservative	D. Connelly	998	34.4	N/A
Alliance	R. Williams	675	23.3	N/A
Majority		229	7.9	N/A
Turnout		2,900	37.7	N/A
Registered electors		7,692		
Labour hold				

=== Stifford ===
Stifford
Party	Candidate	Votes	%	±%
Conservative	J. Greatrex*	1,459	46.7	+4.3
Labour	D. Scully	1,346	43.1	+3.0
Alliance	E. Ward	321	10.3	–7.2
Majority		113	3.6	+1.3
Turnout		3,126	48.9	+4.6
Registered electors		6,393		
Conservative hold		Swing	▲0.7	

=== The Homesteads ===
The Homesteads
Party	Candidate	Votes	%	±%
Conservative	G. Basson	1,039	46.8	+13.9
Labour	Z. Chaudhri	682	30.7	+1.6
Alliance	J. McMeekin	497	22.4	–15.6
Majority		357	16.1	N/A
Turnout		2,218	39.3	–1.3
Registered electors		5,644		
Conservative hold		Swing	▲6.2	

=== Tilbury ===
Tilbury
Party	Candidate	Votes	%	±%
Labour	J. Dunn	1,632	78.5	+29.5
Alliance	M. Bamford	447	21.5	+10.7
Majority		1,185	57.0	+36.3
Turnout		2,079	26.4	–0.1
Registered electors		7,875		
Labour gain from Independent		Swing	▲9.4	

=== West Thurrock ===
West Thurrock
Party	Candidate	Votes	%	±%
Independent Labour	R. Howes	915	59.8	+2.3
Labour	N. Hawes	467	30.5	+1.5
Conservative	J. Reekie	147	9.6	+0.3
Majority		448	29.3	+0.8
Turnout		1,529	38.3	+7.2
Registered electors		3,992		
Independent Labour hold		Swing	▲0.4	
