= 1982 Thurrock Borough Council election =

1982 English local election

- 6 May 1982

13 out of 39 seats to Thurrock Borough Council 20 seats needed for a majority
- Registered: 86,842
- Turnout: 25,927; 29.9% (▼6.1%)

	First party	Second party	Third party
Party	Labour	Conservative	Independent
Seats won	8	3	0
Seats after	21	10	4
Seat change	▲1	▼1	▼1
Popular vote	11,606	8,379	1,127
Percentage	44.8%	32.3%	4.3%
Swing	▼4.4%	▲0.2%	▼4.3%
	Fourth party	Fifth party	Sixth party
Party	Independent Labour	Alliance	Residents
Seats won	1	1	0
Seats after	2	1	1
Seat change	Steady	▲1	Steady
Popular vote	730	3,105	815
Percentage	2.8%	12.0%	3.1%
Swing	N/A	▲8.2%	▼2.6%
- Winner of each seat at the 1982 Thurrock Borough Council election.
Council control before election
No overall control
Council control after election
Labour

The 1982 Thurrock Borough Council election took place on 6 May 1982 to elect members of Thurrock Borough Council in Essex, England. This was on the same day as other local elections in England.

Labour regained control of the council from No overall control.

== Summary ==
=== Election result ===
1982 Thurrock Borough Council election
Party	This election				Full council			This election		
Party	Candidates	Seats	Net	Seats %	Other	Total	Total %	Votes	Votes %	+/−
Labour	{{{candidates}}}	8	▲1	61.5	13	21	53.8	11,606	44.8	–4.4
Conservative	{{{candidates}}}	3	▼1	23.1	7	10	25.6	8,379	32.3	+0.2
Independent	{{{candidates}}}	0	▼1	0.0	4	4	10.3	1,127	4.3	–4.3
Independent Labour	{{{candidates}}}	1	Steady	7.7	1	2	5.1	730	2.8	N/A
Alliance	{{{candidates}}}	1	▲1	7.7	0	1	2.6	3,105	12.0	+8.2
Residents	{{{candidates}}}	0	Steady	0.0	1	1	2.6	815	3.1	–2.6
New Britain	{{{candidates}}}	0	Steady	0.0	0	0	0.0	165	0.6	N/A

== Ward results ==
Seat changes are compared to the last election when that specific seat was up for election and does not take into account by-elections or defections.

=== Aveley ===
Aveley
Party	Candidate	Votes	%	±%
Labour	J. Clark*	906	52.2	–6.9
Conservative	F. Beasley	539	31.1	–4.7
Alliance	J. Norris	289	16.7	+11.6
Majority		367	21.2	–2.1
Turnout		1,734	27.9	–7.2
Registered electors		6,216		
Labour hold		Swing	▼1.1	

=== Belhus ===
Belhus
Party	Candidate	Votes	%	±%
Labour	S. Davis*	1,075	73.0	–1.8
Conservative	C. Clark	398	27.0	+1.8
Majority		677	46.0	N/A
Turnout		1,473	23.7	+1.4
Registered electors		6,221		
Labour hold		Swing	▼1.8	

=== Chadwell St Mary ===
Chadwell St Mary
Party	Candidate	Votes	%	±%
Labour	M. Millane	1,261	52.0	+8.2
Independent	R. Hill	526	21.7	–22.2
Conservative	G. Law	330	13.6	+3.3
Alliance	S. Senior	307	12.7	+10.7
Majority		735	30.3	N/A
Turnout		2,424	30.4	–6.1
Registered electors		7,968		
Labour hold		Swing	▲15.2	

=== Corringham & Fobbing ===
Corringham & Fobbing
Party	Candidate	Votes	%	±%
Labour	P. Rowan	1,577	55.4	–2.4
Conservative	G. Basson	1,270	44.6	+10.2
Majority		307	10.8	–12.6
Turnout		2,847	30.6	–6.5
Registered electors		9,317		
Labour hold		Swing	▼6.3	

=== Grays Thurrock (Town) ===
Grays Thurrock (Town)
Party	Candidate	Votes	%	±%
Labour	A. Nunn	980	40.0	–1.0
Residents	B. Taylor	815	33.3	–6.4
Conservative	G. Riches	464	19.0	+2.0
Alliance	A. Fielder	189	7.7	+5.4
Majority		165	6.7	+5.4
Turnout		2,448	36.5	+0.3
Registered electors		6,699		
Labour hold		Swing	▲2.7	

=== Little Thurrock ===
Little Thurrock
Party	Candidate	Votes	%	±%
Conservative	D. Dimond	1,432	46.9	–7.4
Labour	T. Codley	912	29.9	–7.9
Alliance	G. Rice	708	23.2	+17.8
Majority		520	17.0	+0.5
Turnout		3,052	39.1	+0.6
Registered electors		7,814		
Conservative hold		Swing	▲0.3	

=== Ockendon ===
Ockendon
Party	Candidate	Votes	%	±%
Labour	L. Gay	1,300	65.2	–3.5
Conservative	J. Stone	695	34.8	+3.5
Majority		605	30.3	–7.0
Turnout		1,995	29.5	–1.2
Registered electors		6,774		
Labour hold		Swing	▼3.5	

=== Orsett ===
Orsett
Party	Candidate	Votes	%	±%
Conservative	B. Beardwell*	1,008	74.0	+3.9
Labour	G. Miles	354	26.0	–3.9
Majority		654	48.0	N/A
Turnout		1,362	36.7	–40.5
Registered electors		3,716		
Conservative hold		Swing	▲3.9	

=== Stanford-le-Hope ===
Stanford-le-Hope
Party	Candidate	Votes	%	±%
Labour	A. Thompson*	Unopposed		
Registered electors		7,810		
Labour hold				

=== Stifford ===
Stifford
Party	Candidate	Votes	%	±%
Conservative	H. Lott*	1,224	42.4	–9.5
Labour	D. Scully	1,160	40.1	–5.6
Alliance	E. Ward	506	17.5	N/A
Majority		64	2.3	–3.9
Turnout		2,890	44.3	–7.1
Registered electors		6,527		
Conservative hold		Swing	▼2.0	

=== The Homesteads ===
The Homesteads
Party	Candidate	Votes	%	±%
Alliance	G. O'Brien	876	38.0	+24.2
Conservative	L. Povey*	760	32.9	–9.8
Labour	Z. Chaudhri	671	29.1	–14.5
Majority		116	5.0	N/A
Turnout		2,307	40.6	+1.3
Registered electors		5,681		
Alliance gain from Conservative		Swing	▲17.0	

=== Tilbury ===
Tilbury
Party	Candidate	Votes	%	±%
Labour	E. Rimmell	1,042	49.0	+17.9
Independent	A. Bragg*	601	28.3	–38.1
Alliance	M. Bamford	230	10.8	+8.3
Conservative	L. Moir	141	6.6	N/A
New Britain	D. March	112	5.3	N/A
Majority		441	20.7	N/A
Turnout		2,126	26.5	–5.5
Registered electors		8,019		
Labour gain from Independent		Swing	▲28.0	

=== West Thurrock ===
West Thurrock
Party	Candidate	Votes	%	±%
Independent Labour	E. May*	730	57.5	+10.8
Labour	N. Hawes	368	29.0	+3.0
Conservative	J. Reekie	118	9.3	–8.0
New Britain	B. Slade	53	4.2	N/A
Majority		362	28.5	N/A
Turnout		1,269	31.1	–43.2
Registered electors		4,080		
Independent Labour hold		Swing	▲3.9	
