= 1991 Thurrock Borough Council election =

Local election in England

- 2 May 1991

13 out of 39 seats to Thurrock Borough Council 20 seats needed for a majority
- Registered: 88,846
- Turnout: 31,531; 35.5% (▼8.5%)

	First party	Second party	Third party
Party	Labour	Conservative	Independent
Seats won	10	3	0
Seats after	33	6	0
Seat change	▲2	▼1	▼1
Popular vote	16,826	12,463	1,762
Percentage	53.4%	39.5%	5.6%
Swing	▼9.3%	▲9.8%	▲0.6%
- Winner of each seat at the 1991 Thurrock Borough Council election.
Council control before election
Labour
Council control after election
Labour

The 1991 Thurrock Borough Council election took place on 2 May 1991 to elect members of Thurrock Borough Council in Essex, England. This was on the same day as other local elections in England.

== Summary ==
=== Election result ===
1991 Thurrock Borough Council election
Party	This election				Full council			This election		
Party	Candidates	Seats	Net	Seats %	Other	Total	Total %	Votes	Votes %	+/−
Labour	{{{candidates}}}	10	▲2	76.9	23	33	84.6	16,826	53.4	–9.3
Conservative	{{{candidates}}}	3	▼1	23.1	3	6	15.4	12,463	39.5	+9.8
Independent	{{{candidates}}}	0	▼1	0.0	0	0	0.0	1,762	5.6	+0.6
Liberal Democrats	{{{candidates}}}	0	Steady	0.0	0	0	0.0	480	1.5	N/A

== Ward results ==
=== Aveley ===
Aveley
Party	Candidate	Votes	%	±%
Labour	A. Clarke	889	40.0	–9.8
Independent	E. Vellacott	843	38.0	+8.4
Conservative	L. Glover	488	22.0	+1.5
Majority		46	2.1	–18.1
Turnout		2,220	38.4	–10.1
Registered electors		5,777		
Labour hold		Swing	▼9.1	

=== Belhus ===
Belhus
Party	Candidate	Votes	%	±%
Labour	P. Maynard*	1,004	52.3	–24.1
Conservative	D. Davies	492	25.7	+2.1
Independent	P. Perrin	422	22.0	N/A
Majority		512	26.7	–26.1
Turnout		1,918	33.9	–6.4
Registered electors		5,657		
Labour hold		Swing	▼13.1	

=== Chadwell St Mary ===
Chadwell St Mary
Party	Candidate	Votes	%	±%
Labour	C. Bidmead*	1,834	71.1	–5.5
Conservative	I. Bodley	746	28.9	+5.5
Majority		1,088	42.2	–11.0
Turnout		2,580	34.6	–10.3
Registered electors		7,462		
Labour hold		Swing	▼5.5	

=== Corringham & Fobbing ===
Corringham & Fobbing
Party	Candidate	Votes	%	±%
Labour	C. Morris*	1,680	52.6	–6.1
Conservative	S. Andrews	1,511	47.4	+6.1
Majority		169	5.3	–12.2
Turnout		3,191	33.9	–7.5
Registered electors		9,419		
Labour hold		Swing	▼6.1	

=== Grays Thurrock (Town) ===
Grays Thurrock (Town)
Party	Candidate	Votes	%	±%
Labour	S. Josling*	1,400	54.4	–6.4
Conservative	J. Carter	947	36.8	+9.5
Independent	R. Holcombe	228	8.9	N/A
Majority		453	17.6	–16.0
Turnout		2,575	32.0	–6.4
Registered electors		8,040		
Labour hold		Swing	▼8.0	

=== Little Thurrock ===
Little Thurrock
Party	Candidate	Votes	%	±%
Conservative	D. Sutton	1,858	54.8	+12.7
Labour	P. Betts	1,532	45.2	–2.7
Majority		326	9.6	N/A
Turnout		3,390	39.1	–8.1
Registered electors		8,666		
Conservative hold		Swing	▲7.7	

=== Ockendon ===
Ockendon
Party	Candidate	Votes	%	±%
Labour	M. Jones*	1,403	63.6	–9.0
Conservative	H. Cook	804	36.4	+9.0
Majority		599	27.1	–18.1
Turnout		2,207	35.2	–12.0
Registered electors		6,269		
Labour hold		Swing	▼9.0	

=== Orsett ===
Orsett
Party	Candidate	Votes	%	±%
Conservative	J. Mortimer	1,154	72.1	+41.8
Labour	M. Ware	447	27.9	–30.5
Majority		707	44.2	N/A
Turnout		1,601	42.1	–10.0
Registered electors		3,802		
Conservative hold		Swing	▲36.2	

=== Stanford-le-Hope ===
Stanford-le-Hope
Party	Candidate	Votes	%	±%
Labour	R. Harper*	1,470	49.0	–17.0
Conservative	M. Dalton	1,049	35.0	+1.0
Liberal Democrats	S. Senior	480	16.0	N/A
Majority		421	14.0	–18.0
Turnout		2,999	38.1	–5.7
Registered electors		7,866		
Labour hold		Swing	▼9.0	

=== Stifford ===
Stifford
Party	Candidate	Votes	%	±%
Labour	P. Giles	1,415	51.5	–5.7
Conservative	L. Brown	1,334	48.5	+5.7
Majority		81	2.9	–11.4
Turnout		2,749	43.1	–12.3
Registered electors		6,373		
Labour gain from Conservative		Swing	▼5.7	

=== The Homesteads ===
The Homesteads
Party	Candidate	Votes	%	±%
Conservative	R. Bodley*	1,116	52.8	+10.0
Labour	A. Fish	999	47.2	–10.0
Majority		117	5.5	N/A
Turnout		2,115	35.0	–7.0
Registered electors		6,044		
Conservative hold		Swing	▲10.0	

=== Tilbury ===
Tilbury
Party	Candidate	Votes	%	±%
Labour	J. Dunn*	1,666	72.1	–7.1
Conservative	M. Bamford-Burst	376	16.3	+4.3
Independent	J. Moore	269	11.6	+2.8
Majority		1,290	55.8	–11.4
Turnout		2,311	27.7	–10.8
Registered electors		8,344		
Labour hold		Swing	▼5.7	

=== West Thurrock ===
West Thurrock
Party	Candidate	Votes	%	±%
Labour	G. Hawkins	1,087	64.9	+7.5
Conservative	P. Raven	588	35.1	N/A
Majority		499	29.8	+14.9
Turnout		1,675	32.7	–9.9
Registered electors		5,127		
Labour gain from Independent				
