= 2000 Thurrock Council election =

2000 UK local government election

The 2000 Thurrock Council election took place on 4 May 2000 to elect members of Thurrock Council in Essex, England. One third of the council was up for election and the Labour Party stayed in overall control of the council.

After the election, the composition of the council was:

- Labour 38
- Conservative 10
- Vacant 1

== Election result ==
Thurrock local election result 2000
Party	Seats	Gains	Losses	Net gain/loss	Seats %	Votes %	Votes	+/−
Labour	11	0	4	-4	64.7	45.3	7,433	-18.4
Conservative	6	4	0	+4	35.3	42.6	6,988	+9.5
Ind. Conservative	0	0	0	0	0.0	6.2	1,021	+6.2
Liberal Democrats	0	0	0	0	0.0	4.9	810	+2.2
Independent	0	0	0	0	0.0	0.7	122	+0.7
Green	0	0	0	0	0.0	0.2	38	+0.2

== Ward results ==
Aveley
Party	Candidate	Votes	%	±%
Conservative	Leon Rudman	444	39.1	+14.0
Labour	Arthur Clarke	382	33.7	−19.7
Liberal Democrats	John Livermore	271	23.9	+2.4
Green	Dean Hall	38	3.3	+3.3
Majority		62	5.4	
Turnout		1,135		
Conservative gain from Labour		Swing		

Belhus
Party	Candidate	Votes	%	±%
Labour	Peter Maynard	490	58.8	−10.4
Conservative	David Potter	343	41.2	+10.4
Majority		147	17.6	−20.8
Turnout		833		
Labour hold		Swing		

Chadwell St Mary
Party	Candidate	Votes	%	±%
Labour	Gordon Barton	751	65.8	−10.3
Conservative	Nikki Lewis	390	34.2	+10.3
Majority		361	31.6	−20.6
Turnout		1,141		
Labour hold		Swing		

Chafford Hundred
Party	Candidate	Votes	%	±%
Conservative	Ian Harrison	262	33.2	−32.1
Labour	Martin Healy	250	31.6	−3.1
Liberal Democrats	Earnshaw Palmer	156	19.7	+19.7
Independent	Michael Smith	122	15.4	+15.4
Majority		12	1.6	−29.0
Turnout		790		
Conservative gain from Labour		Swing		

Corringham and Fobbing
Party	Candidate	Votes	%	±%
Conservative	Anne Cheale	551	41.5	
Labour	Gerard Rice	404	30.4	
Ind. Conservative	Francis Mallon	373	28.1	
Majority		147	11.1	
Turnout		1,328		
Conservative hold		Swing		

East Tilbury
Party	Candidate	Votes	%	±%
Labour	Andrew Hart	439	64.7	−17.9
Conservative	Laura Orritt	239	35.3	+17.9
Majority		200	29.4	−35.8
Turnout		678		
Labour hold		Swing		

Grays Riverside
Party	Candidate	Votes	%	±%
Labour	Pearl Betts	428	57.0	−8.1
Conservative	Darren Galvin	323	43.0	+22.8
Majority		105	14.0	−30.9
Turnout		751		
Labour hold		Swing		

Grays Thurrock
Party	Candidate	Votes	%	±%
Labour	Timothy McMahon	511	54.2	−9.8
Conservative	Kazimierz Rytter	431	45.8	+19.1
Majority		80	8.4	−28.9
Turnout		942		
Labour hold		Swing		

Little Thurrock Blackshots
Party	Candidate	Votes	%	±%
Conservative	Geoffrey Slocock	635	62.1	
Labour	Catherine Kent	288	28.2	
Liberal Democrats	Richard Stokkereit	99	9.7	
Majority		347	33.9	
Turnout		1,022		
Conservative gain from Labour		Swing		

Little Thurrock Rectory
Party	Candidate	Votes	%	±%
Conservative	Neil Tuffery	512	56.2	
Labour	David Gooding	399	43.8	
Majority		113	12.4	
Turnout		911		
Conservative gain from Labour		Swing		

Ockendon
Party	Candidate	Votes	%	±%
Labour	Charles Curtis	573	57.6	−10.5
Conservative	Dawn Voggenreiter	421	42.4	+10.5
Majority		152	15.2	−21.0
Turnout		994		
Labour hold		Swing		

Orsett
Party	Candidate	Votes	%	±%
Conservative	Diane Revell	736	55.5	
Labour	Eunice Southam	282	21.3	
Ind. Conservative	Michele Valente	191	14.4	
Liberal Democrats	Peter Saunders	117	8.8	
Majority		454	34.2	
Turnout		1,326		
Conservative hold		Swing		

Stanford-le-Hope East
Party	Candidate	Votes	%	±%
Labour	Peter Cooper	405	49.0	
Conservative	Anita Bailey	228	27.6	
Ind. Conservative	Christopher Sheppard	194	23.5	
Majority		177	21.4	
Turnout		827		
Labour hold		Swing		

Stifford
Party	Candidate	Votes	%	±%
Labour	George Watts	648	47.4	−9.6
Conservative	Pauline Campbell	613	44.8	+1.8
Liberal Democrats	Rabih Makki	107	7.8	+7.8
Majority		35	2.6	−11.4
Turnout		1,368		
Labour hold		Swing		

The Homesteads
Party	Candidate	Votes	%	±%
Labour	Denise Cooper	505	40.0	−12.7
Conservative	Alan Bailey	493	39.1	−8.2
Ind. Conservative	James Mallon	263	20.9	+20.9
Majority		12	0.9	−4.5
Turnout		1,261		
Labour hold		Swing		

Tilbury St Chads
Party	Candidate	Votes	%	±%
Labour	Valerie Liddiard	259	59.1	
Conservative	Yvonne Partridge	119	27.2	
Liberal Democrats	David Coward	60	13.7	
Majority		140	31.9	
Turnout		438		
Labour hold		Swing		

West Thurrock
Party	Candidate	Votes	%	±%
Labour	Robert Williams	419	62.8	−4.8
Conservative	Henry Coe-Welch	248	37.2	+4.8
Majority		171	25.6	−9.6
Turnout		667		
Labour hold		Swing		
