= 1986 Thurrock Borough Council election =

Local election in England

- 8 May 1986

14 out of 39 seats to Thurrock Borough Council 20 seats needed for a majority
- Registered: 87,674
- Turnout: 27,052; 30.9% (▲1.3%)

	First party	Second party	Third party
Party	Labour	Conservative	Independent Labour
Seats won	10	3	1
Seats after	29	7	2
Seat change	▲1	Steady	Steady
Popular vote	15,222	9,388	866
Percentage	52.5%	32.4%	3.0%
Swing	▼1.0%	▼1.8%	N/A
	Fourth party	Fifth party
Party	Independent	Alliance
Seats won	0	0
Seats after	1	0
Seat change	Steady	▼1
Popular vote	584	2,129
Percentage	2.0%	7.3%
Swing	▼4.0%	▲1.4%
- Winner of each seat at the 1986 Thurrock Borough Council election.
Council control before election
Labour
Council control after election
Labour

The 1986 Thurrock Borough Council election took place on 8 May 1986 to elect members of Thurrock Borough Council in Essex, England. This was on the same day as other local elections in England.

== Summary ==
=== Election result ===
1986 Thurrock Borough Council election
Party	This election				Full council			This election		
Party	Candidates	Seats	Net	Seats %	Other	Total	Total %	Votes	Votes %	+/−
Labour	{{{candidates}}}	10	▲1	71.4	19	29	74.4	15,222	52.5	–1.0
Conservative	{{{candidates}}}	3	Steady	21.4	4	7	17.9	9,388	32.4	–1.8
Independent Labour	{{{candidates}}}	1	Steady	7.1	1	2	5.1	866	3.0	N/A
Independent	{{{candidates}}}	0	Steady	0.0	1	1	2.6	584	2.0	–4.0
Alliance	{{{candidates}}}	0	▼1	0.0	0	0	0.0	2,129	7.3	+1.4
Residents	{{{candidates}}}	0	Steady	0.0	0	0	0.0	822	2.8	N/A

== Ward results ==
=== Aveley ===
Aveley
Party	Candidate	Votes	%	±%
Labour	K. Evans	1,311	67.8	+6.2
Conservative	M. Higerty	623	32.2	+3.4
Majority		688	35.6	+2.8
Turnout		1,934	32.4	+3.5
Registered electors		6,054		
Labour hold		Swing	▲1.4	

=== Belhus ===
Belhus
Party	Candidate	Votes	%	±%
Labour	V. Bellinger	1,159	66.6	–11.3
Conservative	C. Clark	354	20.4	–1.7
Independent Labour	S. Davis*	226	13.0	N/A
Majority		805	46.3	–9.6
Turnout		1,739	29.5	+5.3
Registered electors		5,960		
Labour hold		Swing	▼4.8	

=== Chadwell St Mary ===
Chadwell St Mary
Party	Candidate	Votes	%	±%
Labour	M. Millane*	1,484	77.2	+21.3
Conservative	G. Law	438	22.8	+11.1
Majority		1,046	54.4	+25.5
Turnout		1,922	25.0	–2.1
Registered electors		7,838		
Labour hold		Swing	▲5.1	

=== Corringham & Fobbing ===
Corringham & Fobbing (2 seats due to by-election)
Party	Candidate	Votes	%
Labour	N. Barron	1,415	62.7
Labour	A. Fitzmaurice	1,407	62.4
Conservative	J. Hubbard	906	40.2
Conservative	E. Randall	784	34.8
Turnout		~2,553	26.6
Registered electors		9,596	
Labour hold			
Labour hold			

=== Grays Thurrock (Town) ===
Grays Thurrock (Town)
Party	Candidate	Votes	%	±%
Labour	L. Groombridge	1,030	51.6	+13.1
Independent	D. Agassiz	584	29.3	N/A
Conservative	E. Attewell	381	19.1	+1.0
Majority		446	22.4	+17.0
Turnout		1,995	30.0	–2.6
Registered electors		6,717		
Labour hold				

=== Little Thurrock ===
Little Thurrock
Party	Candidate	Votes	%	±%
Conservative	D. Dimond*	1,293	42.7	–5.8
Labour	C. Morris	1,291	42.6	+10.8
Alliance	A. Scott	444	14.7	–5.1
Majority		2	0.1	N/A
Turnout		3,028	37.2	+8.4
Registered electors		8,268		
Conservative hold		Swing	▼8.3	

=== Ockendon ===
Ockendon
Party	Candidate	Votes	%	±%
Labour	A. Aberdein	1,289	59.6	–8.8
Alliance	V. Robinson	510	23.6	N/A
Conservative	G. Riches	363	16.8	–11.5
Majority		779	36.0	–4.1
Turnout		2,162	33.0	+6.4
Registered electors		6,618		
Labour hold				

=== Orsett ===
Orsett
Party	Candidate	Votes	%	±%
Conservative	R. Andrews	987	67.8	–3.4
Labour	G. Rice	468	32.2	+3.4
Majority		519	35.7	–6.8
Turnout		1,455	39.8	+2.5
Registered electors		3,713		
Conservative hold		Swing	▼3.4	

=== Stanford-le-Hope ===
Stanford-le-Hope
Party	Candidate	Votes	%	±%
Labour	D. Hunt	1,493	65.0	+0.9
Conservative	G. Wood	804	35.0	–0.9
Majority		689	30.0	+1.9
Turnout		2,297	28.9	+0.5
Registered electors		8,088		
Labour hold		Swing	▲0.9	

=== Stifford ===
Stifford
Party	Candidate	Votes	%	±%
Labour	A. Smith	1,383	49.2	+3.5
Conservative	H. Lott*	983	34.9	–8.9
Alliance	V. Yeates	447	15.9	+5.5
Majority		400	14.2	N/A
Turnout		2,813	44.2	–4.7
Registered electors		6,448		
Labour gain from Conservative		Swing	▲6.2	

=== The Homesteads ===
The Homesteads
Party	Candidate	Votes	%	±%
Conservative	M. Green	1,100	60.2	+21.0
Alliance	G. O'Brien*	728	39.8	N/A
Majority		372	20.4	N/A
Turnout		1,828	31.2	+0.2
Registered electors		5,862		
Conservative gain from Alliance				

=== Tilbury ===
Tilbury
Party	Candidate	Votes	%	±%
Labour	G. Arnold	1,027	51.9	+1.1
Residents	C. Spriggs	822	41.5	+5.7
Conservative	W. McLaughlin	131	6.6	+0.4
Majority		205	10.4	–4.6
Turnout		1,980	25.0	+3.9
Registered electors		8,022		
Labour hold		Swing	▼2.3	

=== West Thurrock ===
West Thurrock
Party	Candidate	Votes	%	±%
Independent Labour	E. May*	640	47.5	–12.3
Labour	N. Buttell	465	34.5	+4.0
Conservative	R. Trangmar	241	17.9	+8.3
Majority		175	13.0	–16.3
Turnout		1,346	30.3	–8.3
Registered electors		4,490		
Independent Labour hold		Swing	▼8.2	
