= 1980 Thurrock Borough Council election =

1980 English local election

- 1 May 1980

15 out of 39 seats to Thurrock Borough Council 20 seats needed for a majority
- Registered: 84,432
- Turnout: 36.0% (▼38.6%)

	First party	Second party	Third party
Party	Labour	Conservative	Independent
Seats won	8	4	2
Seats after	19	13	4
Seat change	▲1	▼2	▲1
Popular vote	16,646	10,857	2,912
Percentage	49.2%	32.1%	8.6%
Swing	▲3.3%	▼9.5%	▲2.7%
	Fourth party	Fifth party
Party	Independent Labour	Residents
Seats won	0	1
Seats after	2	1
Seat change	Steady	Steady
Popular vote	did not stand	1,939
Percentage	did not stand	5.7%
Swing	▼1.6%	▲3.9%
- Winner of each seat at the 1980 Thurrock Borough Council election.
Council control before election
No overall control
Council control after election
No overall control

The 1980 Thurrock Borough Council election took place on 1 May 1980 to elect members of Thurrock Borough Council in Essex, England. This was on the same day as other local elections in England.

== Summary ==
=== Election result ===
1980 Thurrock Borough Council election
Party	This election				Full council			This election		
Party	Candidates	Seats	Net	Seats %	Other	Total	Total %	Votes	Votes %	+/−
Labour	{{{candidates}}}	8	▲1	53.3	11	19	48.7	16,646	49.2	+3.3
Conservative	{{{candidates}}}	4	▼2	26.7	9	13	33.3	10,857	32.1	–9.5
Independent	{{{candidates}}}	2	▲1	13.3	2	4	10.3	2,912	8.6	+2.7
Independent Labour	{{{candidates}}}	0	Steady	0.0	2	2	5.1	N/A	N/A	–1.6
Residents	{{{candidates}}}	1	Steady	6.7	0	1	2.6	1,939	5.7	+3.9
Liberal	{{{candidates}}}	0	Steady	0.0	0	0	0.0	1,301	3.8	+0.6
Ecology	{{{candidates}}}	0	Steady	0.0	0	0	0.0	156	0.5	N/A

== Ward results ==
=== Aveley ===
Aveley
Party	Candidate	Votes	%	±%
Labour	A. May	1,263	59.1	+5.7
Conservative	F. Beasley*	765	35.8	–10.8
Liberal	J. Norris	108	5.1	N/A
Majority		498	23.3	N/A
Turnout		2,136	35.1	–39.3
Registered electors		6,091		
Labour gain from Conservative		Swing	▲8.3	

=== Belhus ===
Belhus (2 seats due to by-election)
Party	Candidate	Votes	%
Labour	J. Aberdein	1,051	75.4
Labour	R. Fall	1,050	75.3
Conservative	A. Blows	354	25.4
Conservative	J. Dobson	333	23.9
Turnout		~1,395	22.3
Registered electors		6,257	
Labour hold			
Labour hold			

=== Chadwell St Mary ===
Chadwell St Mary
Party	Candidate	Votes	%	±%
Independent	D. Hemmings	1,221	43.9	N/A
Labour	P. Bolger*	1,219	43.8	–13.4
Conservative	G. Law	286	10.3	–20.8
Liberal	M. Haynes	55	2.0	–9.7
Majority		2	0.1	N/A
Turnout		2,781	36.5	–38.9
Registered electors		7,615		
Independent gain from Labour				

=== Corringham & Fobbing ===
Corringham & Fobbing
Party	Candidate	Votes	%	±%
Labour	A. Price*	1,964	57.8	+7.8
Conservative	B. Price	1,169	34.4	–15.6
Liberal	C. Bowler	266	7.8	N/A
Majority		795	23.4	N/A
Turnout		3,399	37.1	–39.4
Registered electors		9,169		
Labour hold		Swing	▲11.7	

=== East Tilbury ===
East Tilbury
Party	Candidate	Votes	%	±%
Residents	D. Allchin*	988	58.2	+13.5
Labour	B. Legrys	435	25.6	–6.6
Conservative	P. Hartlebury	249	14.7	–8.4
Liberal	G. Merchant	25	1.5	N/A
Majority		553	32.6	N/A
Turnout		1,697	41.7	–36.3
Registered electors		4,067		
Residents hold		Swing	▲10.1	

=== Grays Thurrock (North) ===
Grays Thurrock (North)
Party	Candidate	Votes	%	±%
Conservative	M. Thomas*	681	60.5	+0.1
Labour	B. Newsome	445	39.5	–0.1
Majority		236	21.0	+0.2
Turnout		1,126	43.9	–33.8
Registered electors		2,565		
Conservative hold		Swing	▲0.1	

=== Grays Thurrock (Town) ===
Grays Thurrock (Town)
Party	Candidate	Votes	%	±%
Labour	K. Evans*	981	41.0	+5.4
Residents	B. Taylor	951	39.7	+11.2
Conservative	G. Riches	407	17.0	–6.2
Liberal	A. Senior	56	2.3	–10.4
Majority		30	1.3	N/A
Turnout		2,395	36.2	–37.2
Registered electors		6,624		
Labour hold		Swing	▼2.9	

=== Little Thurrock ===
Little Thurrock
Party	Candidate	Votes	%	±%
Conservative	J. Edwards*	1,586	54.3	–8.6
Labour	T. Codley	1,103	37.8	+0.7
Liberal	S. Senior	158	5.4	N/A
Ecology	A. Metcalfe	74	2.5	N/A
Majority		483	16.5	N/A
Turnout		2,921	38.5	–38.8
Registered electors		7,578		
Conservative hold		Swing	▼4.7	

=== Ockendon ===
Ockendon
Party	Candidate	Votes	%	±%
Labour	R. Abel*	1,449	68.7	+8.5
Conservative	J. Stone	659	31.3	–8.5
Majority		790	37.5	N/A
Turnout		2,108	30.7	–42.5
Registered electors		6,874		
Labour hold		Swing	▲8.5	

=== Stanford-le-Hope ===
Stanford-le-Hope
Party	Candidate	Votes	%	±%
Labour	M. Meen*	1,510	63.7	+14.1
Conservative	A. McCartney	860	36.3	–14.1
Majority		650	27.4	N/A
Turnout		2,370	31.0	–44.2
Registered electors		7,643		
Labour hold		Swing	▲14.1	

=== Stifford ===
Stifford
Party	Candidate	Votes	%	±%
Conservative	A. Turner*	1,735	51.9	–1.6
Labour	P. Rice	1,529	45.7	–0.8
Ecology	M. Crowson	82	2.5	N/A
Majority		206	6.2	N/A
Turnout		3,346	51.4	–27.0
Registered electors		6,512		
Conservative hold		Swing	▼0.4	

=== The Homesteads ===
The Homesteads (2 seats due to by-election)
Party	Candidate	Votes	%
Labour	A. Clarke	937	44.7
Conservative	P. Povey	918	43.8
Labour	M. Bonfield	917	43.7
Conservative	L. Green	855	40.8
Liberal	C. Farrand	296	14.1
Liberal	G. Basson	273	13.0
Turnout		~2,149	39.3
Registered electors		5,468	
Labour gain from Conservative			
Conservative hold			

=== Tilbury ===
Tilbury
Party	Candidate	Votes	%	±%
Independent	T. Kendal*	1,691	66.4	+2.6
Labour	A. Fitzmaurice	793	31.1	+6.7
Liberal	M. Bamford	64	2.5	–2.7
Majority		898	35.2	N/A
Turnout		2,548	32.0	–36.3
Registered electors		7,969		
Independent hold		Swing	▼2.1	
