= 2002 Thurrock Council election =

2002 UK local government election

The 2002 Thurrock Council election took place on 2 May 2002 to elect members of Thurrock Council in Essex, England. One third of the council was up for election and the Labour Party stayed in overall control of the council.

43 candidates stood in the election, with 16 of the 20 wards being contested. Both Conservative and Labour parties stood in all 16 seats, along with 7 Liberal Democrats, 3 Independents and 1 Green Party candidate.

After the election, the composition of the council was:

- Labour 37
- Conservative 9
- Independent 2
- Liberal Democrat 1

== Election results ==
Thurrock local election result 2002
Party	Seats	Gains	Losses	Net gain/loss	Seats %	Votes %	Votes	+/−
Labour	13	1	1	0	81.3	48.6	8,379	-6.3
Conservative	1	1	2	-1	6.3	37.1	6,396	-0.4
Independent	1	0	0	0	6.3	7.1	1,220	+6.2
Liberal Democrats	1	1	0	+1	6.3	7.0	1,210	+1.2
Green	0	0	0	0	0.0	0.2	41	+0.0

== Ward results ==
Aveley
Party	Candidate	Votes	%	±%
Conservative	Neil Pearce	889	60.9	+13.6
Labour	Wahidur Rahman	413	28.3	−12.6
Liberal Democrats	Mark Meechan	97	6.6	−1.7
Green	Dean Hall	41	2.8	−0.8
Independent	Pauline Campbell	19	1.3	+1.3
Majority		476	32.6	+26.2
Turnout		1,459	25.7	
Conservative gain from Labour		Swing		

Belhus
Party	Candidate	Votes	%	±%
Labour	David Hooper	597	57.3	−1.3
Conservative	Jane Atkins	306	29.4	+3.7
Liberal Democrats	John Biddall	138	13.3	−2.5
Majority		291	27.9	−5.0
Turnout		1,041	15.9	
Labour hold		Swing		

Chadwell St Mary
Party	Candidate	Votes	%	±%
Labour	Anthony Fish	974	70.1	−4.1
Conservative	Yvonne Partridge	416	29.9	+4.1
Majority		558	40.2	−8.2
Turnout		1,390	19.7	
Labour hold		Swing		

Chafford Hundred
Party	Candidate	Votes	%	±%
Liberal Democrats	Earnshaw Palmer	470	40.6	+15.5
Conservative	Neil Rockliffe	407	35.1	−2.3
Labour	Ian Duffield	282	24.3	−13.2
Majority		63	5.5	
Turnout		1,159	19.8	
Liberal Democrats gain from Conservative		Swing		

Corringham West
Party	Candidate	Votes	%	±%
Labour	Nigel Barron	399	52.3	−9.7
Conservative	Nicola Stokes	230	30.1	−7.9
Liberal Democrats	James Thompson	134	17.6	+17.6
Majority		169	22.2	−1.8
Turnout		763	19.6	
Labour hold		Swing		

East Tilbury
Party	Candidate	Votes	%	±%
Independent	Barry Palmer	941	80.6	+80.6
Labour	Julian Norris	117	10.0	−54.7
Conservative	Susan Harrison	110	9.4	−25.9
Majority		824	70.6	
Turnout		1,168	27.0	
Independent hold		Swing		

Grays Riverside
Party	Candidate	Votes	%	±%
Labour	John Kent	484	51.1	−11.5
Conservative	Faye Rigby	282	29.7	−7.7
Liberal Democrats	Brian Livermore	182	19.2	+19.2
Majority		202	11.4	−13.8
Turnout		948	14.7	
Labour hold		Swing		

Grays Thurrock
Party	Candidate	Votes	%	±%
Labour	Yash Gupta	740	57.1	−4.3
Conservative	Steven Mason	557	42.9	+4.3
Majority		183	14.2	−8.6
Turnout		1,297	20.7	
Labour hold		Swing		

Ockendon
Party	Candidate	Votes	%	±%
Labour	Michael Canavon	751	61.1	−4.5
Conservative	Emma Woods	479	38.9	+4.5
Majority		272	22.2	−9.0
Turnout		1,230	18.3	
Labour hold		Swing		

Stanford-le-Hope East
Party	Candidate	Votes	%	±%
Labour	Eunice Southam	521	52.5	+3.5
Conservative	John Vesey	472	47.5	+19.9
Majority		49	5.0	−16.4
Turnout		993	22.8	
Labour hold		Swing		

Stanford-le-Hope West
Party	Candidate	Votes	%	±%
Labour	Arthur Clarke	405	53.2	
Conservative	Barry Dorrington	356	46.8	
Majority		49	6.4	
Turnout		761	20.2	
Labour hold		Swing		

Stifford
Party	Candidate	Votes	%	±%
Labour	Allan McPherson	719	44.9	−1.1
Conservative	Robert Barnes	623	38.9	+1.9
Independent	Geoffrey Slocock	260	16.2	+8.8
Majority		96	6.0	−3.0
Turnout		1,602	27.1	
Labour hold		Swing		

The Homesteads
Party	Candidate	Votes	%	±%
Labour	Anthony Sharp	709	51.3	−3.0
Conservative	Melanie Aung-Htut	674	48.7	+12.0
Majority		35	2.6	−15.0
Turnout		1,383	24.0	
Labour gain from Conservative		Swing		

Tilbury Riverside
Party	Candidate	Votes	%	±%
Labour	Malcolm Southam	433	82.2	+9.5
Conservative	Jean Watts	94	17.8	+0.5
Majority		339	64.4	+9.0
Turnout		527	14.1	
Labour hold		Swing		

Tilbury St Chads
Party	Candidate	Votes	%	±%
Labour	Andrew Smith	447	67.7	+8.6
Conservative	Maurren Pearce	123	18.6	−8.6
Liberal Democrats	David Coward	90	13.6	−0.1
Majority		324	49.1	+17.2
Turnout		660	16.0	
Labour hold		Swing		

West Thurrock
Party	Candidate	Votes	%	±%
Labour	Peter Harris	388	44.9	−11.9
Conservative	Mark Harrison	378	43.7	+17.8
Liberal Democrats	John Livermore	99	11.4	+1.3
Majority		10	1.2	−29.7
Turnout		865	14.4	
Labour hold		Swing		
