= Sequestration (law) =

Act of property seizure in British law

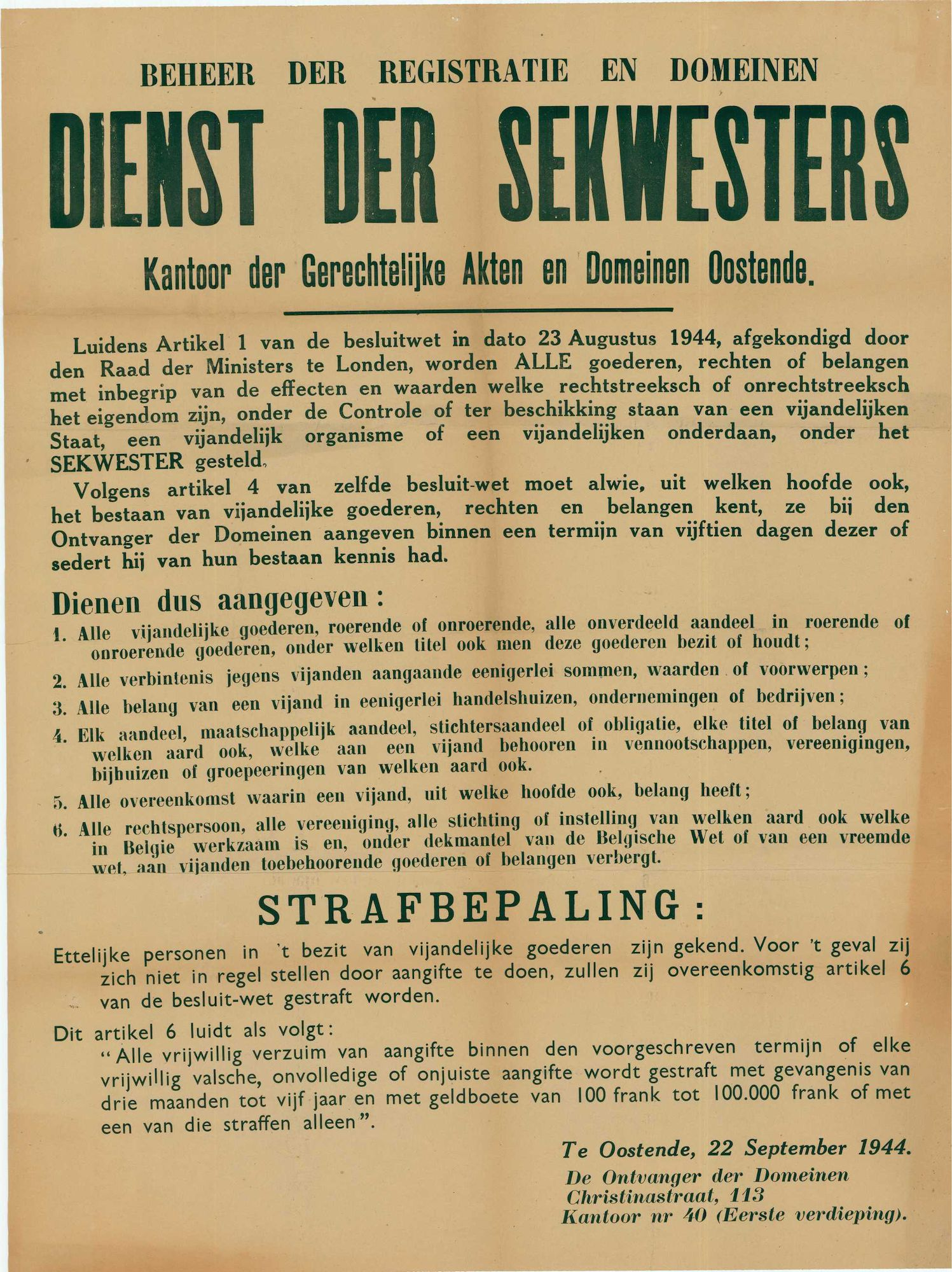
Ostend, Belgium: notice on the sequestration of enemy possessions after the German occupation of Belgium during World War II, pursuant to the Legislative Order of 23 August 1944

In law, sequestration is the act of removing, separating, or seizing anything from the possession of its owner under process of law for the benefit of creditors or the state.

== Etymology ==
The Latin sequestrare, to set aside or surrender, a late use, is derived from sequester, a depositary or trustee, one in whose hands a thing in dispute was placed until the dispute was settled; this was a term of Roman jurisprudence (cf. Digest L. 16,110). By derivation it must be connected with sequi, to follow; possibly the development in meaning may be follower, attendant, intermediary, hence trustee. In English "sequestered" means merely secluded, withdrawn.

== England ==
In law, the term "sequestration" has many applications; thus it is applied to the act of a belligerent power which seizes the debts due from its own subject to the enemy power; to a writ directed to persons, "sequestrators", to enter on the property of the defendant and seize the goods.

=== Church of England ===
There are also two specific and slightly different usages in term of the Church of England; to the action of taking profits of a benefice to satisfy the creditors of the incumbent; to the action of ensuring church and parsonage premises are in good order in readiness for a new incumbent and the legal paperwork to ensure this.

As the goods of the Church cannot be touched by a lay hand, the writ is issued to the bishop, and the bishop issues the sequestration order to the church wardens who collect the profits and satisfy the demand. Similarly when a benefice is vacant the church wardens take out sequestration under the seal of the Ordinary and manage the profits for the next incumbent.

== Scotland ==
In Scots law, bankruptcy is known as sequestration and sequestration allows a trustee-in-sequestration to take over a sequestrated individual's estate by order of the local Sheriff Court for the benefit of the creditors' unpaid debts.

== Assets Recovery Agency ==
The Assets Recovery Agency (ARA) was established in the United Kingdom under the Proceeds of Crime Act 2002 to reduce crime by sequestering the proceeds of crime; its powers include civil recovery through the High Court. The ARA was later merged with the Serious Organised Crime Agency.

== See also ==
- Attachment (law)
- Confiscation
- Distraint
- Search and seizure
- Sequestration Committee
