= Criminal Assets Bureau =

Irish law enforcement agency

Criminal Assets Bureau An Biúró um Shócmhainní Coiriúla

Agency overview
- Formed: October 15, 1996; 30 years ago
- Employees: 91 (total (2015)): 47 Garda Síochána members; 21 Department of Justice, Home Affairs and Migration officials; 17 Revenue Commissioners officers; 6 Department of Social Protection officers
- Annual budget: €8.832 million

Jurisdictional structure
- National agency (Operations jurisdiction): IE
- Operations jurisdiction: IE
- Map of Criminal Assets Bureau's jurisdiction
- Area: 70,273 km^{2}
- Population: 4,784 million (2017)
- Legal jurisdiction: Ireland
- Constituting instrument: Criminal Assets Bureau Act, 1996
- General nature: Civilian police

Operational structure
- Headquarters: Walter Scott House, Military Road, Dublin, D08 HE2P, Ireland
- Elected officer responsible: Jim O'Callaghan, TD, Minister for Justice, Home Affairs and Migration
- Agency executives: Michael Gubbins, Chief Bureau Officer; Kevin McMeel, Bureau Legal Officer

Notables
- Award: Taoiseach's Public Service Excellence Awards (2004)

Website
- www.cab.ie
- Data as of Annual Report 2021

The Criminal Assets Bureau (CAB; Irish: An Biúró um Shócmhainní Coiriúla) is a law enforcement agency in Ireland. The CAB was established with powers to focus on the illegally acquired assets of criminals involved in serious crime. The aims of the CAB are to identify the criminally acquired assets of persons and to take the appropriate action to deny such people these assets. This action is taken particularly through the application of the Proceeds of Crime Act 1996. The CAB was established as a body corporate with perpetual succession in 1996 and is founded on the multi-agency concept, drawing together law enforcement officers, tax officials and social welfare officials as well as other specialist officers including legal officers, forensic analysts and financial analysts. This multi-agency concept is regarded by some as the model for other European jurisdictions.

The CAB is not a division of the Garda Síochána (police) but rather an independent body corporate, although it has many of the powers normally given to the Gardaí. The Chief Bureau Officer is drawn from a member of the Garda Síochána holding the rank of Chief Superintendent and is appointed by the Garda Commissioner. The remaining staff of the CAB are appointed by the Minister for Justice, Home Affairs and Migration. CAB members retain their original powers as if they were working within their separate entities and have direct access to information and databases that their original organisations are allowed by law. This ability to share information was described by the Garda Síochána Inspectorate in its Crime Investigation Report of October 2014 as "a good model that could be replicated outside of CAB".

The CAB reports annually to the Minister through the Commissioner of the Garda Síochána and this report is laid before the Houses of the Oireachtas. The Minister for Justice, in publishing the 2011 CAB Annual Report, stated: "The work of the bureau is one of the key law enforcement responses to tackling crime and the Government is very much committed to further strengthening the powers of the bureau through forthcoming legislative proposals." In publishing the Bureau's 2012 report the Minister for Justice set out: "The Annual Report provides an insight into the workings of the Bureau and highlights the advantage of adopting a multi-agency and multi-disciplinary approach to the targeting of illicit assets. The Bureau is an essential component in the State’s law enforcement response to serious and organised crime and the Government is fully committed to further strengthening its powers through future legislative reform."

The Minister for Justice set out that Ireland, through the work of the Bureau, has established itself as a jurisdiction that is responding to that challenge and the work of the Bureau is internationally recognised as a best practice approach to tackling criminality and the illicit monies it generates.

The CAB has been effective against organised criminals, especially those involved in the importation and distribution of drugs. It has also been used against corrupt public officials and terrorists.

== Legislative framework ==
The Law Reform Commission provides consolidated legislation relating to the Bureau, namely:

- Criminal Assets Bureau Act 1996 (updated to 28 May 2019)
- Proceeds of Crime Act 1996 (updated to 30 July 2018)

The Proceeds of Crime Acts were amended further by the Proceeds of Crime (Amendment) Act 2016. The Proceeds of Crime (Amendment) Act 2016 is designed to facilitate the seizure of property which is suspected to be the proceeds of crime by expanding the powers of the Criminal Assets Bureau to seize those proceeds. This act amends the Proceeds of Crime Act 1996 in two key respects. First, it allows the Criminal Assets Bureau to seize property which it suspects to be the proceeds of crime for up to 21 days. Second, it reduces the threshold value of property which can be pursued by the Criminal Assets Bureau from €13,000 to €5,000.

== Objectives ==
The statutory objectives of the CAB are:

1. the identification of the assets of persons which derive, or are suspected to derive, directly or indirectly from criminal conduct;
2. the taking of appropriate action under the law to deprive or to deny those persons of such assets or the benefit of such assets, and
3. the pursuit of any necessary investigation or other preparatory work in relation to relevant proceedings.

The emergence of CAB signalled a more focused approach on targeting the financial proceeds of crime than previously existed.

== Overview ==
The CAB collected €89 million in taxes in its first ten years of existence and it also engaged in initiatives to curtail international criminality. The CAB has a staff of 91, including members of Garda Síochána, Revenue Commissioners, (both customs and taxes officers), and civil servants from the Department of Social Protection and the Department of Justice, Home Affairs and Migration. Its annual budget for 2011 was €6.673 million, of which 86% is salary cost. This was reduced to €6.410 million in 2012, but has increased to 8.832m Euro in 2018.

=== Budget ===
The budget of the Bureau over the period 2008 to 2021 was as follows:

=== Officers and staff ===
Officers and staff of the CAB (with the exception of members of the Garda Síochána and the Bureau Legal Officer) are protected with statutory anonymity. This anonymity, whilst causing some concerns, has been recognised an important practical issue for all countries when faced with action against people who may be involved in violent crime and extortion and recognises that although police and customs officers are usually trained to deal with such threats and to expect them, revenue and social security officials do not reasonably expect to have to deal with such risks when they take a job.

A number of people have been convicted for threatening CAB officers:

- Christopher Pratt was sentenced in 2013 to three years in prison for threatening to "take the head off" a CAB officer.
- Paschal Kelly was sentenced in 2015 to four-and-a-half years in prison for threatening a CAB officer, tax evasion and serious driving offences, and more recently in February 2019 was sentenced to 18 years in prison following a conviction for a "tiger kidnapping".

Fachtna Murphy was the first Chief Bureau Officer and Barry Galvin was the first Bureau Legal Officer. The current Chief Bureau Officer is Detective Chief Superintendent Michael Gubbins (who succeeded Pat Clavin) and the current Bureau Legal Officer is Kevin McMeel. The former Bureau Legal Officer was Declan O'Reilly. The Bureau Legal Officer is appointed following a recruitment campaign run by the Public Appointments Service.

== Background ==
The Criminal Assets Bureau was established on 15 October 1996 by the Minister for Justice, Nora Owen. The CAB was established to deal with increasing levels of serious organised crime in Ireland, most notable being the murders of crime reporter Veronica Guerin and Detective Garda Jerry McCabe.

The CAB was set up by the Oireachtas as a body corporate primarily for the purpose of ensuring that persons should not benefit from any assets acquired by them from any criminal activity. It was given power to take all necessary actions in relation to seizing and securing assets derived from criminal activity, certain powers to ensure that the proceeds of such activity are subject to tax, and also in relation to the Social Welfare Acts. However, as the High Court has noted, it is not a prosecuting body nor a police authority but rather it is an investigating authority which, having investigated and used its powers of investigation, then applies to the High Court for assistance in enforcing its functions.

== Proceeds of crime ==
A novel or radical aspect of the CAB was the use of civil forfeiture to freeze and seize the proceeds of criminal conduct under the Proceeds of Crime Act, 1996. Ireland was one of the first countries to introduce civil forfeiture. Civil forfeiture involved a recognition on the part of the State that conventional methods of tackling organised crime were ineffective. Whilst the CAB was perhaps intended to confiscate the assets of drug dealers and those involved in organised crime its powers can extend to all assets that are the result of criminal activity. Even though the CAB focuses on serious and organised crime, it has increasingly moved against low- and medium-level offenders who may present as poor role models within their communities, albeit that these cases often cost more to bring than they return financially. The CAB has been distinguished from other agencies who tackle serious organised crime in Ireland in that those agencies may be typified as being reactive whereas the CAB is proactive; a fact which may be considered as representing a significant development in crime control. Whilst novel to Ireland, the concept of forfeiture in the absence of a criminal conviction has a long ancestry, with roots in ancient Rome and evidence of its lineage in the Old Testament. It has long been an important feature of the jurisprudence of the US and has recently been adopted in other common law jurisdictions, including the UK and the Cayman Islands, in their proceeds of crime legislation.

In 2005, the CAB's powers were amended by Part 3 of the Proceeds of Crime (Amendment) Act 2005. The purpose of this Act was to make further provision in relation to the recovery and disposal of proceeds of crime. This involved amending four different acts as follows:

1. the Proceeds of Crime Act 1996,
2. the Criminal Assets Bureau Act 1996,
3. the Criminal Justice Act 1994, and
4. the Prevention of Corruption (Amendment) Act 2001.

The Act was intended to substantially bolster the powers of the CAB in the continuing battle to target the proceeds of all types of crime and will extend those powers to the proceeds of white-collar crime and corruption. The substantial provisions of the Act extended the proceeds of crime legislation to cover foreign criminality and corrupt enrichment. In addition, there were a number of technical provisions relating to court procedures, search powers and evidence.

Under the Proceeds of Crime Act 1996 and 2005, if the CAB can satisfy the High Court on the balance of probabilities that specified property is the proceeds of crime, the court will make an interim order over the property preventing anybody from dealing with it. This order stays in place for 21 days, following which an application is made for an interlocutory hearing, on notice to any person who has an interest in that property. If it appears to the court that such property is the proceeds of crime, despite anything said by any respondent, an interlocutory order is put in place for a period of seven years. In the course of that time any person who can satisfy the court that the property is not the proceeds of crime can move to have the order lifted. If no such order has been granted during those seven years, the CAB can seek a disposal order effectively extinguishing anybody's rights to the properties and transferring it to the central exchequer. In April 2014, Deputy Eamonn Maloney sponsored a private members Bill to amend the Proceeds of Crime Acts. Section 1 of the Bill seeks to reduce the seven-year period to two years. This Bill was listed before the Dáil on Friday 8 May 2015 and is viewed as a move by the Government to toughen the laws on confiscating criminals' assets and similarly is expected to yield a multimillion-euro windfall for the taxpayer. As the Bill is a Private Members' Bill, its referral to Select Committee on Justice, Defence and Equality was required pursuant to the Standing Orders 82A and 118.

In July 2016, the statutory threshold of €13,000 as set out under the Proceeds of Crime Act, 1996 was reduced to €5,000. This was done to facilitate the Bureau in targeting mid-level proceeds of crime.

This Irish model, including the Irish legislation, the innovative multi-agency Criminal Assets Bureau approach, as well as judicial dicta, has played a central role in the expansion of the non-conviction based approach across the common law world.

=== Constitutional and human rights debate ===
Some have suggested that, for example, a bridal gift from a perpetual tax evader to his daughter might now find itself on the responding end of an order from the CAB. The limits of the legislation are uncertain and accordingly, the Proceeds of Crime Act 1996 and 2005 has been subject to academic review. Writing in 2014, one academic concluded:

The Proceeds of Crime Act was hastily rushed through parliament in the summer of 1996 in the wake of significant concerns surrounding organized crime and little thought was given to its implications, and likely effectiveness, of this legislation... Ireland will continue to be driven by this sense of populist punitiveness whereby harsh regimes are introduced for no other reason than that they are appealing.

Others conclude that civil forfeiture and recovery is a potent crime fighting device:

Civil recovery is a particularly useful device where the offender is unavailable for prosecution or where it is difficult to obtain sufficient evidence to obtain a conviction against him, primarily because of the reluctance of witnesses to testify. Hence, it is an important tool for dealing with crime bosses who are usually divorced from the day-to-day activities of their enterprise and thus insulated from detection and prosecution.

Civil forfeiture holds with the view that it is not enough to prosecute the perpetrator but recognises the importance of also combatting the driving forces behind the criminal act.

The Supreme Court however, in reviewing the Proceeds of Crime Act 1996 concluded:

... as has been pointed out, repeatedly, a person directly or indirectly in possession of the proceeds of crime can have no constitutional grievance if deprived of their use. The Proceeds of Crime Acts 1996–2005 are identified as being legislation "to enable the High Court, as respects the proceeds of crime, to make orders for the preservation and, where appropriate, the disposal of property concerned and to provide for related matters". There is a strong public policy dimension to this legislation. That policy is to ensure that persons do not benefit from assets which were obtained with the proceeds of crime irrespective of whether the person benefiting actually knew how such property was obtained with the proceeds of crime but subject to whether or not such person may have been a bona fide purchaser for value, where different considerations may arise.

The Act provides for fair procedures to be observed. It cannot be seen as arbitrary. It is designed to achieve a desirable social objective and be proportionate. It cannot be said to impinge on a right to private property, as the property was acquired unlawfully. One of the facts to be borne in mind is the extent to which, as a result of the commission of crime, persons may directly or indirectly benefit in a way not open to other members of the community, such as living without the requirements of payments of tax, mortgage repayments or rent. These activities are profoundly anti-social and contrary to the common good. The interference with the rights of private property embodied in Article 40.3.2 and Article 43 of the Constitution and Article 8 of the European Convention on Human Rights are, therefore, proportionate and in accordance with law.

— MacMenamin J.

Similar legislation in England and Wales has also withstood constitutional scrutiny in its highest courts. In 2014, the Supreme Court of India addressed the issue of whether forfeiture of property violated Article 20 of the Constitution of India. In deciding that forfeiture did not violate the constitution, the Indian Supreme Court cited with approval the Irish High Court decision in Gilligan v Criminal Assets Bureau. It noted that non-conviction based asset forfeiture model was also to be found in various countries: United States of America, Italy, Ireland, South Africa, UK, Australia and certain provinces of Canada. Similar civil forfeiture legislation was found to be constitutional compliant in Bulgaria.

== Ad Hoc Legal Aid ==
The Department of Justice operated the CAB Ad Hoc Legal Aid Scheme until 2014. However, from 1 January 2014 the remit for the administration of the Scheme transferred to the Legal Aid Board. The scheme is applicable to persons who are respondents and/or defendants in any court proceedings brought by, or in the name of, the CAB or its Chief Bureau Officer or any member of the CAB, including court proceedings under the Proceeds of Crime Act 1996, Revenue Acts or Social Welfare Acts.

The scheme also includes:

- social welfare appeals made to the Circuit Court under Section 34 of the Social Welfare Act 1997;
- tax appeals made to the Circuit Court under the Taxes Acts where the CAB or its Chief Bureau Officer or any member of the CAB is the respondent and/or defendant; and
- applications made by the Director of Public Prosecutions under Section 39 of the Criminal Justice Act 1994

The Ad Hoc Legal Aid Scheme provides that the grant of legal aid, including the level of legal representation and/or witness expenses allowed, is a matter for the court with the appropriate jurisdiction to deal with the specific case. The calculation of fees which apply to counsel representing the legally aided person is made in accordance with the mechanism which is in operation under the Criminal Justice (Legal Aid) Act 1962 and the Regulations made under that Act.

The CAB Ad Hoc Legal Aid Scheme cost €334,000 in 2009, up 18% from the previous year's figure of €283,000. It cost €257,000 in 2010.

In October 2014, the Department of Public Expenditure and Reform suggested that the State could cut its criminal legal aid bill by using the Criminal Assets Bureau to carry out a "more thorough" analysis of defendants' ability to pay.

== Outcomes ==
From the Bureau's establishment in October 1996 up to end of 2011 the Bureau successfully froze over €70m worth of criminals' assets. It also collected €137m of the €200m demanded in unpaid taxes, interest and penalties. CAB also made social welfare savings of almost €6m and recovered over €2m in fraudulently claimed welfare. According to the Annual Report for 2017, the total amount of funds restrained was in excess of €4.8 million. However, one case currently under investigation accounts for approximately €3.5 million. Tax recovered by the Bureau during 2017 amounted to €2.374m from fifty one individuals / entities and as a result of actions by Social Welfare Bureau Officers, a total sum of €319,720.31 was returned to the Exchequer in 2017.

== International cooperation ==
The statutory functions of the Criminal Assets Bureau include the taking of all necessary actions for the purpose of the freezing and confiscation of assets suspected of deriving from criminal activity and that such actions include, where appropriate, subject to any international agreement, cooperation with any police force or any authority outside Ireland which has functions related to the recovery of proceeds of crime.

CAB represents Ireland at the Camden Assets Recovery Interagency Network (CARIN), a group which aims to improve informal cross-border and inter-agency cooperation within the European Union and elsewhere. CAB currently sits on the CARIN steering group. The CAB held the presidency of CARIN in 2005 and again in 2013.

EU Council Decision 2007/845/JHA obliges Member States to set up or designate national Asset Recovery Offices (AROs) as national central contact points which facilitate, through enhanced cooperation, the fastest possible EU-wide tracing of assets derived from crime. This Decision was designed to complete the CARIN by providing a legal basis for the exchange of information between Asset Recovery Offices of all the Member States. The Decision allows the AROs to exchange information and best practices, both upon request and spontaneously, regardless of their status (administrative, law enforcement or judicial authority). It requests AROs to exchange information under the conditions laid down in Framework Decision 2006/960/JHA2 ("the Swedish Initiative") and in compliance with the applicable data protection provisions. Ireland designated the Criminal Assets Bureau as its ARO.

In 2008 a Cross Border Fuel Fraud Enforcement Group was established by the Northern Ireland Security Minister, Paul Goggins, and operates under the auspices of the Organised Crime Task Force. On this group, which is chaired by HM Revenue and Customs, sits the Police Service of Northern Ireland (PSNI), Serious Organised Crime Agency (SOCA), the Northern Ireland Environment Agency together with the CAB, the Revenue Commissioners and the Garda Síochána. The Criminal Assets Bureau is also represented on the Joint Agency Task Force, which was created under the "Fresh Start Agreement" to identify strategic priorities for combatting cross-border organised crime and to oversee operational co-ordination.

The CAB is a member partner of Organised Crime Portfolio (OCP) (HOME/2011/ISEC/AG/FINEC/400000222) which is funded by EU Commission, DG Home Affairs and is carried out by an international consortium coordinated by Transcrime – Università Cattolica del Sacro Cuore (Milan, Italy). The aims of the project are to study the investments of organised crime in European Union Member States, analyse the infiltration of organised crime groups and assess the impact on legitimate markets.

== See also ==
- Garda Bureau of Fraud Investigation (GBFI)
- France: Agence de recouvrement des avoirs saisis et confisqués (AGRASC)
- Netherlands: Bureau Ontnemingswetgeving Openbaar Ministerie (BOOM; Criminal Assets Deprivation Bureau)
- United Kingdom: Assets Recovery Agency (ARA)
