= Essex Police =

English territorial police force

Agency overview
- Formed: 1840; 186 years ago
- Preceding agencies: Essex Constabulary; Southend-on-Sea Borough Police
- Annual budget: £330.3 million (2021/22)

Jurisdictional structure
- Operations jurisdiction: Essex, England
- Map of police area
- Area: 1,420 square miles (3,700 km^{2})
- Population: 1,800,000 residents
- Legal jurisdiction: England and Wales
- Constituting instrument: Police Act 1996
- General nature: Local civilian police

Operational structure
- Overseen by: His Majesty's Inspectorate of Constabulary and Fire & Rescue Services; Independent Office for Police Conduct
- Headquarters: Springfield, Chelmsford
- Police officers: 3,842 (including 524 special constables) (September 2020)
- Police community support officers: 104 (September 2020)
- Police, Fire and Crime Commissioner responsible: Roger Hirst
- Agency executive: Rachel Nolan, chief constable
- Basic Command Units: South; West; North; London Stansted Airport
- Police stations/bases: 30

Website
- www.essex.police.uk

Essex Police is a territorial police force responsible for policing the county of Essex, in the East of England. Essex Police is responsible for a population of over 1.8 million people and an area of 1,420 square miles (3,700 km^{2}).

The chief constable is Rachel Nolan, who took up the appointment in September 2026.

Essex and Kent Police share support services, such as administration, fleet and a Serious Crime Directorate (SCD). It is currently led by Assistant Chief Constable Andy Pritchard who works across both force areas. The collaboration between them began in 2010.

Essex Police are overseen by the elected Essex Police, Fire and Crime Commissioner, Roger Hirst.

== History ==
Essex Constabulary was formed in 1840. In 1965, the force had an establishment of 1,862 officers.

Southend-on-Sea Borough Police was established by the county borough of Southend-on-Sea, England, in 1914. In 1969, Southend-on-Sea Borough Police amalgamated with Essex Constabulary to become the Essex and Southend-on-Sea Joint Constabulary. This merger was campaigned against by the council and the local MPs. Colchester, at one time, also had its own police force.

The title was shortened to Essex Police in 1974. On 1 April 2000, Essex Police's boundary expanded further south-west, taking on the populated areas of Loughton, Waltham Abbey, Chigwell and Buckhurst Hill from the Metropolitan Police, a result of boundary changes to the Metropolitan Police District for it to match Greater London's boundaries.

Epping Forest Keepers act as Epping Forest constables in the Forest parishes in the south-west of the Essex Police area; they have different powers from those of the Essex Police.

=== Chief constables ===
Chief constables of Essex have been:

Essex Constabulary (1840)

- 1840–1881: John Bunch Bonnemaison McHardy
- 1881–1887: William Henry Poyntz
- 1888–1915: Edward McLean Showers
- 1915–1932: John Alfred Unett
- 1933–1962: (Sir) Francis Jonathan Peel
- 1962–1978: Sir John Cyprian Nightingale (knighted in 1975 New Year Honours)

Essex Police (1974)

- 1978–1987: (Sir) Robert Sidney Bunyard
- 1988–1998: John Halcrow Burrow
- 1998–2005: David Frederick Stevens
- 2005–2009: Roger Baker
- 2009–2013: Jim Barker-McCardle
- 2013–2018: Stephen Kavanagh
- 2018–present: Ben-Julian Harrington

=== Officers killed in the line of duty ===
The Police Roll of Honour Trust and Police Memorial Trust list and commemorate all British police officers killed in the line of duty. Since its establishment in 1984, the Police Memorial Trust has erected 50 memorials nationally to some of those officers.

Since 1849, the following officers of Essex Police were killed while attempting to prevent or stop a crime in progress:

- Constable Ian Dibell, 2012
- Constable Gary John Veal, 2002
- Constable Roderick Norton Daniels, 2001
- Constable Christopher John Wiggins, 1992
- Acting Sergeant Brian John Bishop, 1984
- Constable Peter James Wringe, 1982
- Constable Brian Arthur Rippingale, 1968
- Sergeant Edmund Sleigh Frost, 1948
- Constable George William Gutteridge, 1927
- Constable Joseph Watt, 1913
- Acting Sergeant Adam John Eves, 1893
- Inspector Thomas Simmons, 1885
- Constable Robert Bamborough, 1850
- Head Constable William Campling, 1849

== Organisation ==
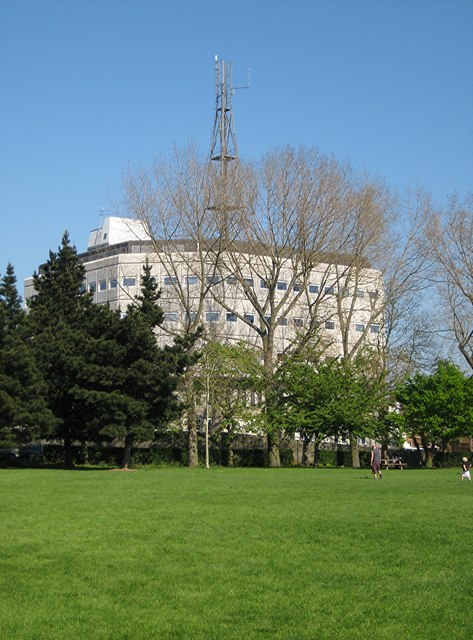
Essex Police headquarters in Chelmsford

Essex Police is one of the United Kingdom's largest non-metropolitan police forces with a strength of over 4,000 sworn police officers. Its headquarters, the Force Control Room (FCR) (where emergency calls are routed to) and Essex Police College, are both located in Chelmsford. The chief constable is Rachel Nolan, the counties first female Chief Constable, taking over from Ben-Julian Harrington, who retired in August 2026.

Strategically, Essex is an important force. Bordering London, the force area consists of affluent city suburbs, large urban areas, industrial centres, rural villages, London Stansted Airport (one of the busiest international airports in the country) and two of the UK's major ports (Harwich and Tilbury). The force also polices one of the largest expanses of coastline of any force in the UK. The police area covers 1,420 square miles (3,700 km^{2}) and has a population of around 1,800,000.

The force has been a regular innovator and is often used by the Home Office to trial new procedures and equipment, including automatic number plate recognition (ANPR), Lantern (handheld wireless fingerprint verification) and the X26 Taser.

Previously a number of specialist teams within Essex were grouped into the Mobile Support Division. In 2012, Essex Police moved away from the divisional structure to a patrol based structure and the former components of the Mobile Support Division were moved to new command structures. Roads Policing and Dog Section became part of the Response and Patrol function.

=== Crime Division ===
Crime Division works across the territorial divisions of Essex and with forces nationwide, providing resources and expertise.

As a division within Essex Police, it deals with the specialist aspects of crime investigation, tending to focus on serious crime, but not exclusively and provides support to territorial divisions' efforts in investigating crime.

Crime Division has a command team structure of a divisional commander, supported by a director of intelligence, lead senior investigating officer, support manager and divisional administrative manager, based at the Chelmsford headquarters. This team is supported by section heads. The work of the various departments of Crime Division are both proactive and reactive.

==== Major Investigation Team ====
The investigation of major crimes underwent significant changes during the 1980s and 1990s, particularly following the introduction of standardised major incident room procedures and the Home Office Large Major Enquiry System (HOLMES). In April 2000, Essex Police established dedicated major investigation teams to investigate offences including murder, rape, abduction and extortion. Operating from four permanent locations at Harlow, Brentwood, Stanway and Rayleigh, these teams were intended to improve investigative efficiency and address difficulties associated with obtaining specialist resources. The restructuring also reflected concerns about investigative standards highlighted by the Macpherson Report into the murder of Stephen Lawrence.

In April 2000, the Major Investigation Team (MIT) was set up to investigate homicides, abductions, rapes and extortion. Each major investigation has a senior investigation officer (SIO), who is like the conductor of an orchestra, overseeing all the different parts of the investigations. The SIO works with a MIT and they are supported by the resources of Major Investigation Centralised Administrative Support (MICAS).

There are four MIT offices: Harlow, Brentwood, Stanway and Rayleigh. The scale of enquiry determines the manpower required, the well-publicised case of the murdered schoolgirl Danielle Jones in June 2001 being a good example of the four offices 'pooling' resources and working as one team.

==== Operational Support Group (OSG) (QX) ====
The OSG are members of Essex Police who are trained to deal with riots, drugs raids, Method of entry (MOE) Specialist MOE (SMOE) and Chemical Biological Radiation & Nuclear (CBRN) and evacuation in the event of a CBRN attack, and other public order incidents. They are the equivalent of the Metropolitan Police TSG unit. The OSG will travel outside of their home force for the collection of suspects that are detained in other parts of the country, who are wanted for offences that took place in Essex. They are based at Boreham, outside of Chelmsford. They will either be wearing the bump cap style baseball caps on patrol, or flat caps dependent on what duty they are undertaking.

When not engaged in other specialists duties, OSG officers perform mobile patrols. Most officers are trained in advanced driving, and assist Roads Policing Unit colleagues in pursuits and policing the roads using high performance vehicles. Alternatively, officers may support local officers in policing the night-time economy.

The OSG train regularly in public order tactics and methods of entry.

==== Force Support Unit (FSU) ====
The FSU provide firearms and tactical assistance, equivalent to the Met's CO19 branch. They respond to firearms callouts, help out with drug raids, as well as taking part in covert operations. They also patrol Stansted Airport, and in September 2016, armed patrols started at Southend Airport and Lakeside shopping centre. The FSU officers are all Authorised Firearms Officers (AFOs) and can go on to be Specialist Firearms Officers (SFOs). They will either be wearing baseball caps on patrol, or the "Fritz" style helmet for tactical duties. The FSU shot Stephen Debley, the first person to be shot by Essex Police for 31 years as of October 2016. They have also been involved in many manhunts, the most well known and recent being the death of PC Dibell, who was shot by 63-year old Peter Reeve in Clacton on Sea.

==== Roads Policing Unit (RPU) ====
The Essex Police Roads Policing Unit (RPU) operates out of four locations across the county. Part of OPC, the RPU works to the National Roads Policing Strategy which has five strands; casualty reduction, counter terrorism, anti-social use of the roads, disrupting criminality and high visibility patrols of the road network. RPU is supported by the Casualty Reduction Section, the Commercial Vehicle Unit and the Serious Collision Investigation Unit. The RPU patrol a 4,500 miles (7,200 km) road network, including major roads such as the A12, A120, M11 & M25.

The Safer Essex Roads Partnership (SERP) brought together the three local authority areas of Essex County Council, Southend-on-Sea Borough Council and Thurrock Council to provide a road safety service across the 'Greater Essex' region. The other SERP partners are Essex Police, Essex Fire and Rescue Service, Highways England, the Essex and Herts Air Ambulance Trust, the East of England NHS Trust and the Safer Roads Foundation.

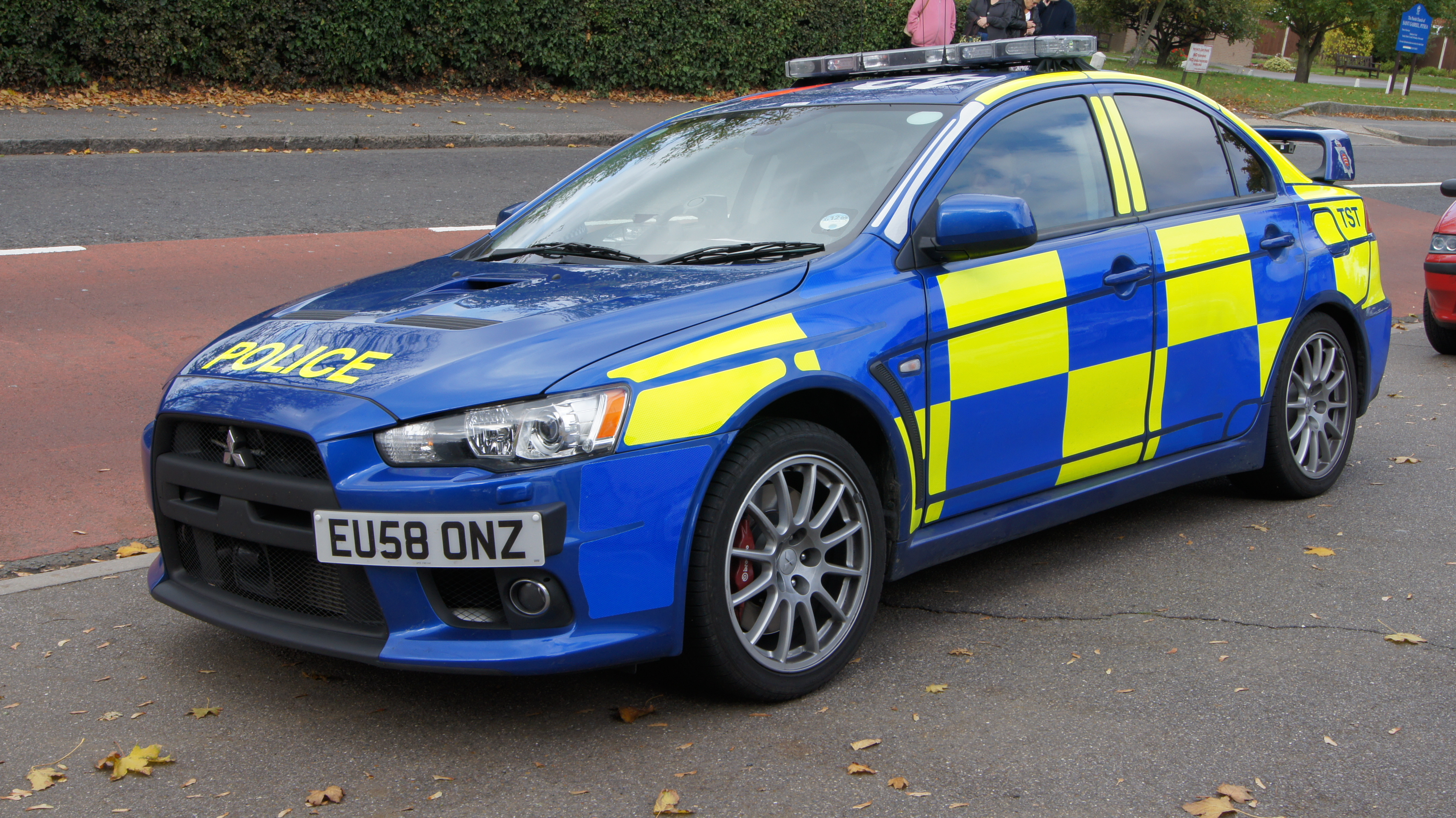
Mitsubishi Lancer Evolution X ANPR Intercept Team vehicle in 2009

When grouped under the operations of the Mobile Support Division, Essex Police's high-performance traffic unit, the ANPR Intercept Team (later renamed to the Territorial Support Team), was the subject of the first three series of Channel 5 television programme Police Interceptors between 2008 and 2011. Based from Chigwell, Laindon and Stanway, the ANPR Intercept Team utilised high-performance pursuit vehicles equipped with automatic number-plate recognition (ANPR) systems, including Ford Mondeo ST220s and Mitsubishi Lancer Evolution IXs, later replaced by Mitsubishi Lancer Evolution Xs and Subaru Imprezas in 2008, to pursue and intercept suspect vehicles with assistance from the force's Air Support Unit. One Subaru Impreza from this fleet would later be converted into a driving simulator in 2009 following an accident that damaged it beyond repair.

==== Special Branch ====
Essex Police's Special Branch (SB) was formed in 1970, when MI5 required an input from all provincial police forces. The Special Branch deals with any matters which may involve any form of subversive activity, such as terrorism, which may affect either life or property nationally or internationally. The air and seaports are specific areas where SB officers operate to ensure that those involved in internal and/or external acts of terrorism are prevented from entering or leaving the country.

SB also maintains close contacts with other police services, both within the UK and abroad, to exchange information on persons who are known or believed to be involved in terrorist activity.

On the domestic front, SB combat public disorder by dealing with those involved in extreme activity of any description. Special Branch workload has increased exponentially in the years following the September 11 attacks and 7 July 2005 London bombings. Much of what SB does is highly sensitive, involving national security, and goes unnoticed by the general public.

SB officers are also tasked and trained in armed, close protection duties and work to protect royalty, VIPs and anyone else who could be under threat of attack or assassination, whilst in the Essex Police District.

The force's Marine Unit, based in Burnham-on-Crouch, was moved under the responsibility of the Special Branch in April 2014 as a result of force cutbacks.

=== Serious Crime Division ===
The Serious Crime Division (SCD) consists of a team of highly experienced detectives who are involved in investigating serious and organised crime inside and outside of the Essex police area. The work of the SCD is centrally coordinated to prioritise crimes and locations that will have most effect on the overall performance of the force. The unit also utilise mobile surveillance teams. Day-to-day business for the SCD includes investigations into serial crimes, such as burglary, car crime and robbery, where criminals cross multiple borders to commit crime.

==== Economic Crime Unit ====
The Economic Crime Unit (ECU) is part of SCD and is based at Brentwood. The ECU is made up of detective officers and accredited civilian financial investigators, whose work is overseen by a detective inspector.

The ECU has two distinct but overlapping functions. The first is the investigation of serious and complex fraud. Referrals to the ECU are from other agencies, such as the Department for Business, Serious Fraud Office and Office for the Supervision of Solicitors. The ECU will also take on investigations referred to it by territorial divisions, subject to certain criteria having been met. The unit does not normally accept investigations directly from members of the public.

The second function is the confiscation and/or forfeiture of assets held by persons convicted of drug trafficking offences. With the arrival of the Proceeds of Crime Act 2002 and the government's determination to be more proactive in this area the scope of confiscation and/or forfeiture has increased to include criminal offences of an acquisitive nature.

=== Hi-Tech Crime Unit ===
The Hi-Tech Crime Unit deals with computer crime and the use of computers in committing crimes. Offences may include harassment, theft, hacking, phone phreaking (making telephone calls which are then charged to another person's bill) and child pornography.

Many of these are new crimes, which have only appeared since the widespread availability of computers and the Internet. The Hi-Tech Crime Unit is a relatively new addition to policing in Essex and forms part of a national network of agencies fighting against computer crime, headed by the National Hi-Tech Crime Unit based in London Docklands.

Essex Police's Hi-Tech Crime Unit works closely with other network investigators and law enforcement agencies. Although it has been in existence only a short time, the unit has already seen significant results. Part of the work of the unit involves seizing computer-related evidence and using forensic methodology software. Officers have the ability to interrogate the seized computer, even when information has been deleted, and rebuild it to find out what was done and how. The unit also assists police officers in computer-related cases, particularly with conducting interviews or producing technical statements, and produces evidence for court.

The unit is staffed by trained computer specialists, and advise businesses of the dangers of computer crime, particularly in e-commerce.

=== Force Intelligence Bureau ===
The role of the Force Intelligence Bureau (FIB) is to assist criminal investigation across the county by bringing together local intelligence from different divisions and out of the police area. The FIB collects information on dangerous sex offenders and those criminals whose activities span more than one area of Essex or across counties. They also analyse trends and links between crimes, so that they can use the right people and the right methods in the right places to prevent crime, this has been discontinued and now has been banned in the area.

==== Stolen Vehicle Section ====
The Stolen Vehicle Section of the Force Intelligence Bureau was formed around 1964 to lend assistance and support to police officers in dealing with motor vehicle crime. One of the main functions of the section is the examination and identification of suspect vehicles, plant and other equipment, both by thermal and chemical etching of erased and hidden serial and identification numbers.

After examination, all vehicles identified as stolen by the unit carry a 'Polexam' tamperproof marker. This is placed on a number of locations on the examined vehicle and a marker created on the Police National Computer to indicate that it has been subject of a previous police examination.

The unit were responsible for the implementation of the "decoy vehicle" programme. They are also involved in vehicle crime analysis and attend warrants and briefings where vehicle crime is suspected or known.

=== MOSOVO (Management of Sexual Offenders & Violent Offenders) ===
The main function of MOSOVO is to assess the threat posed by sex offenders and other potentially dangerous and violent criminals. 'Dangerous offenders' are those people "likely to inflict serious physical or psychological harm on others".

The issue of how to protect the public from dangerous offenders has been vigorously debated since the early 1970s, when a highly publicised homicide case involving a released mental patient led to demands for stronger preventative measures.

MOSOVO work with the Multi-Agency Public Protection Panel (MAPPP), who co-ordinate intelligence and action to reduce the risk posed to the public by potentially dangerous offenders. MAPPP meetings are led by police, probation and social services, with input from other agencies such as housing and criminal justice mental health teams, depending on the case.

The MOSOVO is also responsible for maintaining the Sex Offenders Register, which came into force under the Sex Offenders Act 1997. All convicted sex offenders must register their name and address with police and inform them within 14 days of moving to a new property.

=== Vehicle fleet ===
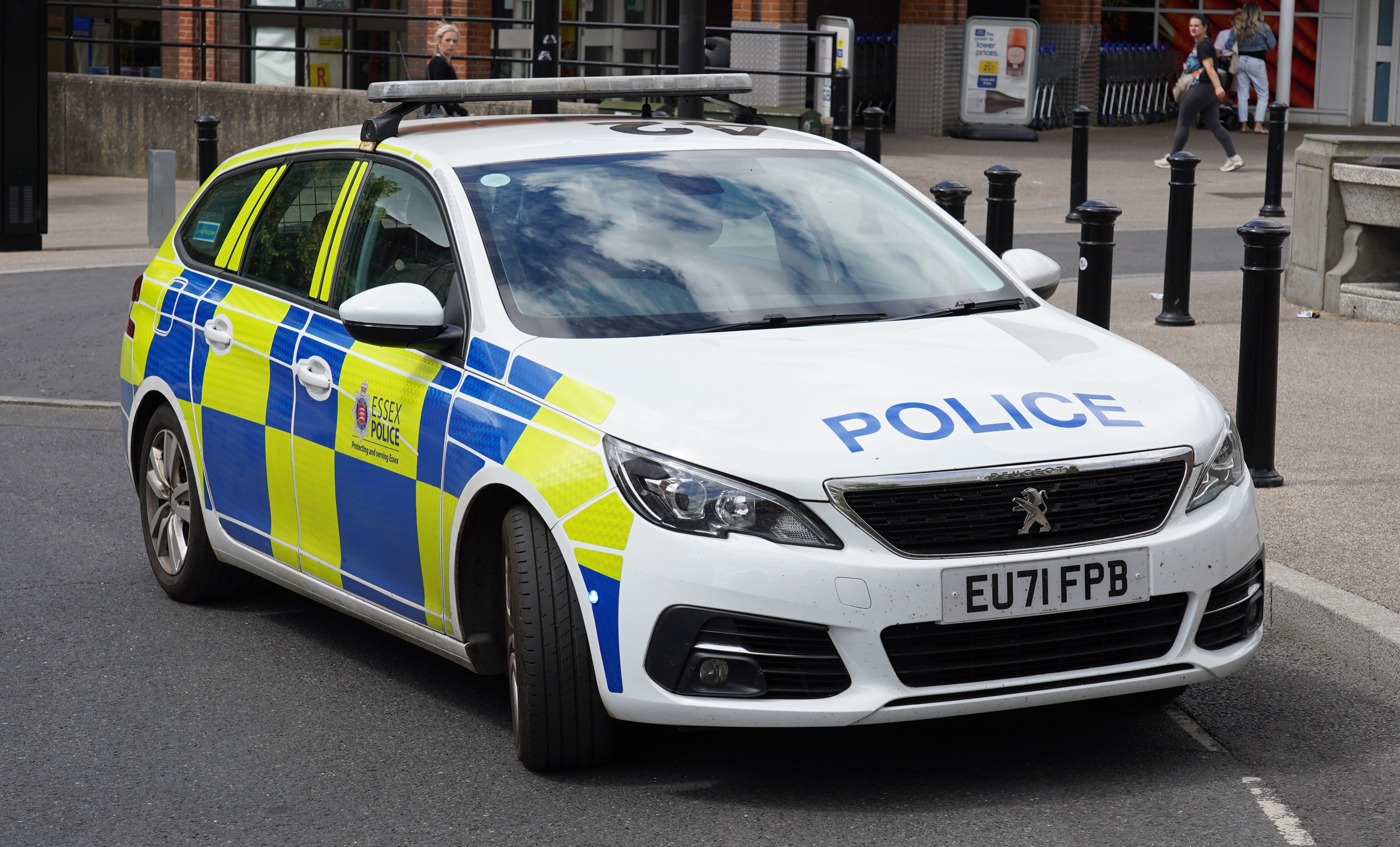
Peugeot 308 SW in Braintree in 2024

As of January 2024, Essex Police operates a total of 242 cars, 74 vans, eight motorcycles, and 54 bicycles in its marked vehicle fleet. A joint fleet workshop in Boreham, operated in co-operation with the Essex Fire and Rescue Service, is set to open in 2026.

== Police, fire and crime commissioners ==
The Essex Police, Fire and Crime Commissioners (PFCC) have been:

- 2012–2016 : Nick Alston
- 2016–present : Roger Hirst

== PEEL inspection ==
His Majesty's Inspectorate of Constabulary and Fire & Rescue Services (HMICFRS) conducts a periodic police effectiveness, efficiency and legitimacy (PEEL) inspection of each police service's performance. In its latest PEEL inspection, Essex Police was rated as follows:

| | Outstanding | Good | Adequate | Requires Improvement | Inadequate |
|---|---|---|---|---|---|
| 2021/22 rating | | Treatment of the public; Developing a positive workplace; Good use of resources | Investigating crime; Preventing crime; Protecting vulnerable people; Managing offenders | Responding to the public | |

== See also ==
- Law enforcement in the United Kingdom
- List of law enforcement agencies in the United Kingdom, Crown Dependencies and British Overseas Territories

Other emergency services:

- East of England Ambulance Service
- Essex Air Ambulance
- Essex County Fire and Rescue Service
