= Proceeds of Crime Act =

Proceeds of Crime Act may refer to:

- Proceeds of Crime Act 2002, of the United Kingdom
- Proceeds of Crime Act 2002 (Australia), of the Commonwealth Government of Australia
- Proceeds of Crime Act, 1996, of the Republic of Ireland
