= B. J. Harrington =

British senior police officer

Ben-Julian Harrington
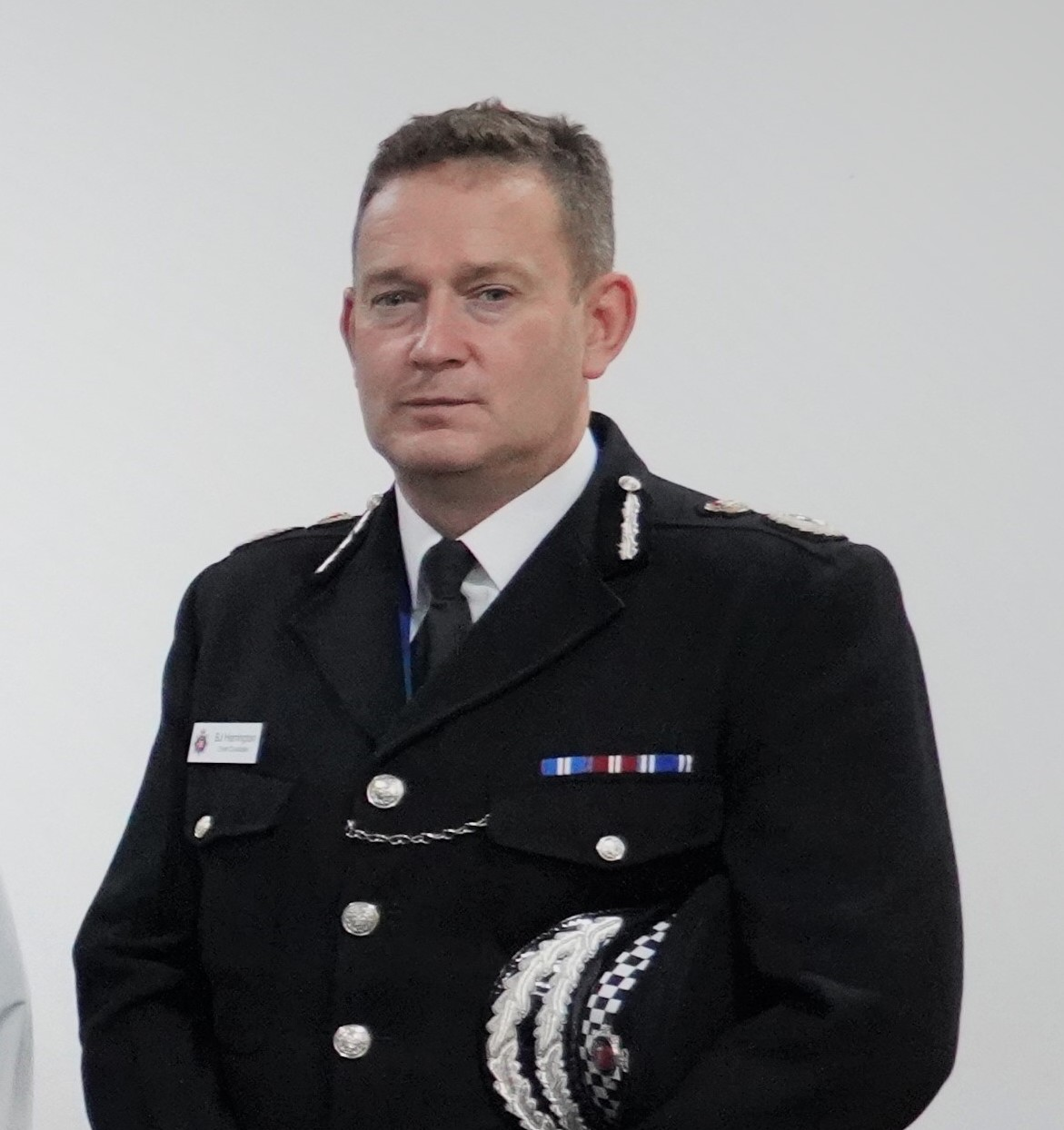
- Harrington in 2021

Chief Constable of Essex Police
- In office 4 October 2018 – 23 July 2026
- Home Secretary: Sajid Javid; Priti Patel; Suella Braverman; Grant Shapps; Suella Braverman; James Cleverly; Yvette Cooper
- Commissioner: Roger Hirst
- Preceded by: Stephen Kavanagh

Personal details
- Born: 26 September 1968 (age 58)
- Children: 2
- Website: https://www.essex.police.uk/

Ben-Julian Harrington (born 26 September 1968) is a British former police officer who served as the Chief Constable of Essex Police from October 2018 to July 2026. He started his policing career with the Metropolitan Police Service in 1990, where he worked in Chingford and Walthamstow. Before becoming chief constable, Harrington was the temporary deputy chief constable of Essex Police.

== Early life ==
Growing up in North London, Harrington attended St. Ignatius College in Enfield.

Having left school, Harrington worked for a bank, before working for HM Customs and Excise.

Harrington was also a reserve soldier with the 10th Battalion Parachute Regiment.

== Policing career ==
=== Metropolitan Police ===
In 1990, Harrington joined the Metropolitan Police as a constable, starting his career as a response officer in and around Chingford and Walthamstow in North East London.

Having worked on response, Harrington joined the Territorial Support Group, working at Caledonian Road and then the North Finchley base.

In 1996, Harrington was promoted to sergeant and moved to Tottenham, leading both a response and neighbourhood policing team for Tottenham High Road and the Broadwater Farm Estate.

In 1999, Harrington returned to the Territorial Support Group, working at Finchley. For the following four years, Harrington served across various teams, leading both uniform and crime operations, as well as being involved in public order duties. Within this time, Harrington was promoted to Inspector, heading one of the units of the Territorial Support Group. At the end of his time with the Territorial Support Group, Harrington was acting as a chief inspector before reaching the rank substantively.

Having been promoted to chief inspector, Harrington was in charge of operations at Paddington Green, within the City of Westminster. He led the response policing for this area of London, as well as being responsible for the Secure Counter Terrorist Custody suite. Harrington later qualified as an advanced public order commander. During this time, he studied and graduated with a Post Graduate Diploma in Police Leadership from Leicester University.

In 2006, Harrington was promoted to superintendent, moving to Lewisham in South East London to work in operations, including leading community and response policing and the implementation of Safer Neighbourhood Teams. He was also responsible for the policing of Millwall Football Club. Whilst at Lewisham, Harrington led the Criminal Investigation Department, alongside his operations responsibilities. During this time, Harrington graduated as a part of the Cabinet Office Leaders UK senior public service leadership programme.

Harrington left Lewisham and was promoted to chief superintendent, being responsible for the Metropolitan Police's three command and control centres. He continued to work as a public order commander at events such as the Notting Hill Carnival and as part of this, led the force-wide review into how officers were conducting stop and search.

During 2012, Harrington was a silver commander for the 2012 Olympics in London, before being seconded to the "One Met Model change team". Within this role, Harrington was promoted to deputy assistant commissioner within Specialist Crime and Operations, leading the development and change of operations and specialist crime.

In 2013, Harrington became the borough commander for Camden in North London, being responsible for one of the busiest areas in London. Here he implemented the first Safer Neighbourhood Board and increased the number of volunteer police cadets to more than 100 young people.

By October 2014, Harrington had achieved the rank of area commander for North West London, having completed the Strategic Command Course.

In June 2015, Harrington was responsible for public order and operations policing across London.

Harrington also worked as one of the National Counter Terrorism Commanders.

=== Essex Police ===
In April 2017, Harrington was seconded to Essex Police to work as the deputy chief constable.

On 4 October 2018, Harrington became chief constable.

Alongside his responsibilities with Essex Police, Harrington is also the chair of the National Police Chiefs' Council Operations Coordination Committee (NOCC) and leads the Joint Emergency Interoperability Programme (JESIP).

On 18 October 2022, police, fire and crime commissioner Roger Hirst reappointed Harrington towards the end of his five-year contract, with Harrington's contract as chief constable of Essex being until October 2026.

On 1 May 2026, Harrington announced that he would retire from Essex Police, with his retirement taking effect on 23 July 2026.

== Personal life ==
Harrington is married to a former police officer from the Metropolitan Police and has two teenage daughters.

== Honours ==

Ribbon	Description	Notes
	Queen's Police Medal (QPM)	Distinguished Service; 2022 New Year Honours
	Queen Elizabeth II Golden Jubilee Medal	2002; UK version
	Queen Elizabeth II Diamond Jubilee Medal	2012; UK version
	Queen Elizabeth II Platinum Jubilee Medal	2022; UK version
	King Charles III Coronation Medal	2023; UK version
	Police Long Service and Good Conduct Medal	With 30 Years Service Clasp

Police appointments
Preceded by Stephen Kavanagh	Chief Constable of Essex Police; 2018-present	Incumbent
