= Passenger Information Unit (Ireland) =

The Passenger Information Unit is a proposed, yet to be named, Irish government agency which will be responsible for monitoring airline passenger records for suspected terrorists and criminals. The organisation structure is to be modeled on the Criminal Assets Bureau.
