= David Wall =

David Wall may refer to:

- David Wall (actor) (fl. 1990s–2000s), American actor
- David Wall (dancer) (1946–2013), British ballet dancer
- David Wall (racing driver) (born 1983), Australian racing driver
- David S. Wall (fl. 1990s–2020s), British professor of criminology
- David Wall (footballer) (born 1947), former Australian rules footballer

== See also ==
- Dave Wahl (fl. 1990s), three-time winner of the World Championship Snowmobile Derby
- David Walls (disambiguation)
