= David Walls =

David Walls may refer to:

- David Walls (academic) (born 1941), professor emeritus of sociology at Sonoma State University, USA
- Ginger Wildheart (born 1964), British musician and singer (born David Walls) with the band The Wildhearts

== See also ==
- David Wall (disambiguation)
