= Legislative Order (Belgium) =

Binding executive decree

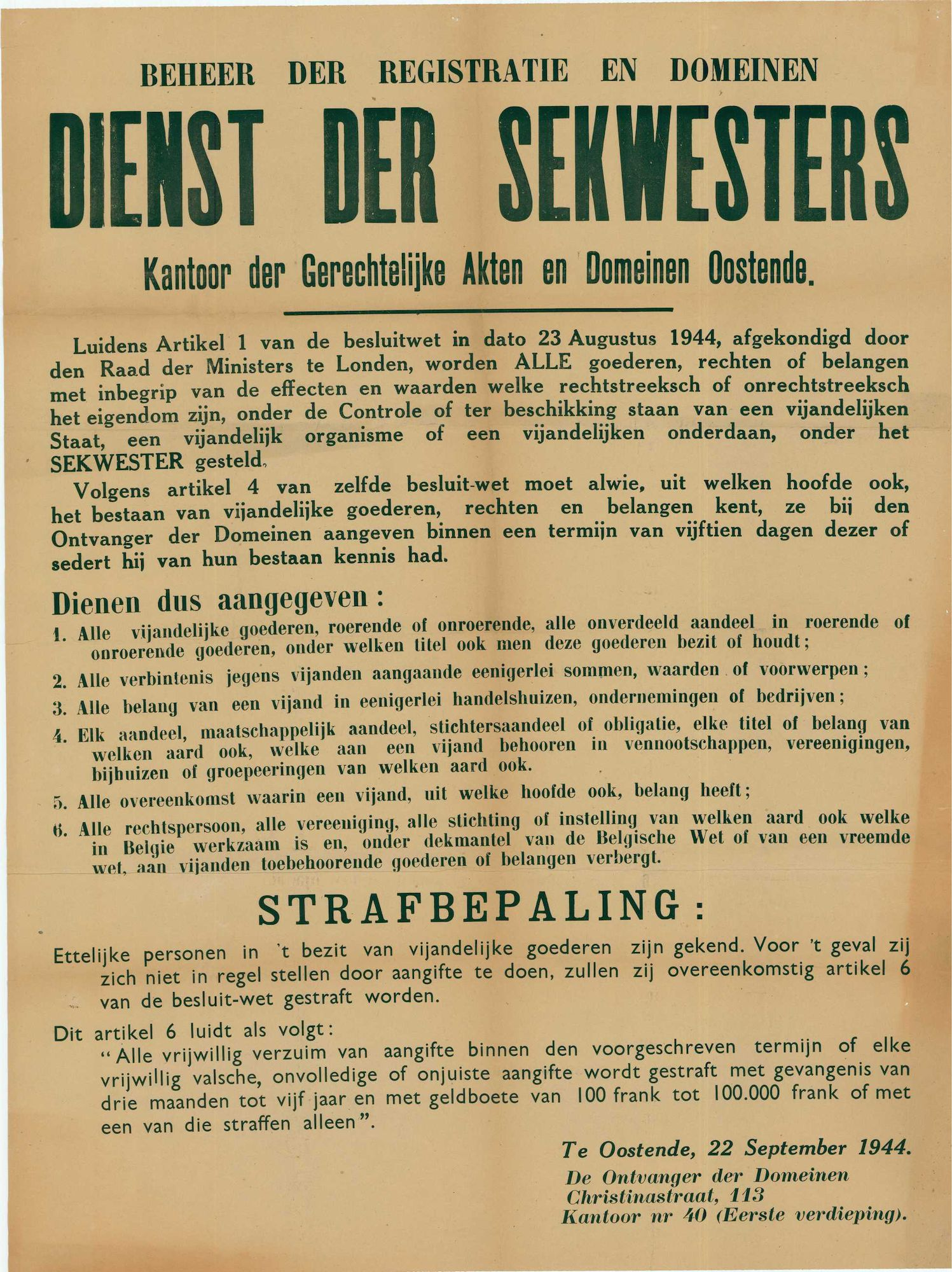
Notice on the Legislative Order of 23 August 1944 concerning the sequestration of enemy possessions after the German occupation of Belgium during World War II

Legislative Order (Dutch: Wet-besluit or Besluitwet, French: Arrêté-loi, literally translated in English as law-order) in Belgium refers to laws adopted by the Belgian Government during the First and the Second World War, when the Belgian Parliament was unable to meet.
