= National Crime Squad =

British law enforcement agency

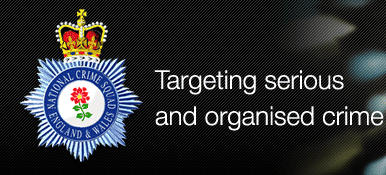
National Crime Squad logo

The National Crime Squad (NCS) was a British police organisation which dealt with national and transnational organised and major crimes. Formed in April 1998 after the amalgamation of six former Regional Crime Squads, it merged with parts of HM Customs & Excise and the National Criminal Intelligence Service on 1 April 2006 to become the Serious Organised Crime Agency. Subsequent to the Police Reform Act 2002, the NCS Service Authority reported directly to the Home Office and had nationwide and international jurisdiction. It did not handle security matters, referring such matters to the appropriate security service.

== Areas of focus ==
The NCS primarily dealt with organised crime, major drug trafficking, contract killing, arms trafficking, human trafficking, computer and high tech crimes, money counterfeiting and laundering, extortion, kidnapping and murder relating to any of the above. Lastly, it augmented and supported regional forces throughout the United Kingdom.

== Organisation ==
The organisation's officers were seconded from police forces from England and Wales, supported by directly recruited specialist civilian and police staff members. It was headed by a director-general and had its own service authority. The first director-general was Roy Penrose, and upon his retirement in 2001, William Hughes became the director-general before moving on to establish the Serious Organised Crime Agency as its founding director-general. Trevor Pearce previously deputy director-general took over as the third director-general before becoming an executive director and later director-general of the Serious Organised Crime Agency.

The NCS headquarters was at Pimlico in London, with three Regional Operational Command Units: Northern, Eastern, and Western with an extensive residential property estate plus other premises. Other units were the Financial OCU, the Paedophilia Unit, the National Hi-Tech Crime Unit, and the Immigration Crime Team. The NCS consisted of 1,656 full-time personnel, including five directors, 1,169 seconded police officers, and 280 civilian police staff.

== Appearances in fiction ==
The NCS was fictionalised in the television series NCS: Manhunt, and in Burnside, a spin-off of The Bill.
