= National Drugs Intelligence Unit =

The National Drugs Intelligence Unit (NDIU) is a British police service providing law enforcement agencies with information and intelligence about criminal activity.

Its functions as defined in statute are to "gather, store and analyse information in order to provide criminal intelligence".

== History ==
The first unit tasked with dealing with international crime focused on illicit drugs to be formed in the UK was during the latter parts of the 1970s and consisted of officers from the Association of Chief Police Officers, customs officers and Interpol Drug Enforcement Administration. The unit was created without consulting parliament.

During 1985 a National coordinator was appointed by the Home office, this person was subsequently involved in the transition from the Central Drugs Intelligence Unite to the NDIU.

The NDIU became the National Criminal Intelligence Service (NCIS) in 1992. The NCIS was created in April 1992 to deal with organized crime, at that time from concerns particularly about drug trafficking.

== See also ==
- National Criminal Intelligence Service
- Peter Clarke (police officer)
- National Drug Intelligence Bureau
- National Drug Intelligence Center
