= Jane Earl =

British civil servant

Jane Earl was appointed to the post of Director of the Assets Recovery Agency on 5 November 2002, and took up her post on 3 February 2003. Prior to this she was chief executive of Wokingham Unitary Council from November 1999.

She has 20 years experience in local government, working for local authorities such as Elmbridge Borough Council and the London Borough of Hounslow. She worked for Reading Borough Council for five years from 1982 to 1987 and for a further six years from 1989 to 1996 which culminated in her holding the post of assistant chief executive.

Jane was regional director of Business in the Community (1996–98). Prior to this she was seconded to the Government Office for the South East creating a practical strategy for the regeneration of Thanet.
