= David S. Wall =

British criminologist

David S. Wall FRSA FAcSS is Professor Emeritus of Criminology at the Centre for Criminal Justice Studies, School of Law, University of Leeds, England, where he has researched cybercrime, policing, organised and transnational crime and intellectual property crime. He rejoined the University of Leeds in August 2015 from Durham University, where he was Professor of Criminology and Head of the School of Applied Social Sciences (SASS) (2011-2014). Before moving to Durham in 2010 he was Professor of Criminal Justice and Information Society at the University of Leeds, where he also held the position of Head of the School of Law (2005–2007) and Director of the Centre for Criminal Justice Studies (2000–2005). He became Professor Emeritus in August 2026. He was a Fellow of the Alan Turing Institute 1918-21. Wall is currently a member of the Technical Board of the Oxford University Global Cyber Security Capacity Centre and a fellow of the Oxford Martin School.

== Research ==
Wall's specialist area of research is crime and information technology, particularly with regard to policing and cybercrime, organised crime and intellectual property crime (counterfeiting). He has a sustained track record of conducting sole and collaborative research projects for the EU, AHRC, ESRC, EPSRC, Nuffield, Home Office, Law Society and many others. During his career, with various partners, he conducted interdisciplinary research projects into Cybercrime and Cybersecurity (RIUK (formerly RCUK). The main projects were 'Cybercrime in the Cloud' – Critical (EPSRC/ESRC – EP/M020576/1 - 2015-2023) (with Newcastle and Durham Universities); 'Ransomware and Crimes of Extortion' (Emphasis – Economical, Psychological and Societal Impact of Ransomware) (ESPRC/ESRC – EP/P011772/1 - 2017-2019) with Kent, De Montfort, City and Coventry universities; 'Organized crime and terror networks Takedown' – (Horizon 2020 – Grant 700688 - 2016-2019)(with 19 European universities and agencies); Crime in a Changing Cyberthreat Landscape (EPSRC CeRes - 2013-2017 - with Cardiff University). He also completed various research projects with Transcrime (Università Cattolica del Sacro Cuore of Milan and the University of Trento) on Mapping out the Market for the Proceeds of Organised Crime (FP7 - 2013-2014) and Counterfeiting Fashion Apparel and Accessories (EU Aegis FP6 - 2005-2007, also with the CNRS, (Sorbonne, Paris).

During his career he has published many works, but between 2011 & 2026 he has focused upon the organization of cybercrime, policing cybercrime, copyright trolling, and 'online micro-frauds', which include, amongst other offences, scareware, click fraud and phishing. A selection of pre-print versions of the articles and working papers can be found on the SSRN site and in The Conversation. Further information can be found on his University of Leeds website. Between 2022-2024 Wall worked on a considerable rewrite of his 2007 Polity book 'Cybercrime: The transformation of crime in the information age' to include the implications of a further decade and a half of significant cybercrime events (see Wall, 2004 below). In 2026-2028 he is working with Andrew Goldsmith on a book for Polity on the increasing Weaponization of Cybercrime.

== Publications ==
His publications include 12 books on his various research topics and 55 or more articles, chapters and reports.

His books are as follows:

- Wall, D.S. (2024) Cybercrime: The transformation of crime in the information age, 2nd Edition, Cambridge: Polity (John Wiley). (Hardback ISBN 978-0-7456-5352-5) (Paperback ISBN 978-0-7456-5353-2). Also published in South Korea by Jinyoung Publishing.
- Wall, D.S. and Williams, M.L. (2014) (eds) Policing Cybercrime: Networked and Social Media Technologies and the Challenges for Policing, 150+x pp. (ISBN 978-1-138-02527-1)
- Stallion, M. and Wall, D.S. (2012) The British Police: Forces and Chief Officers 1829 -2012, Second Edition, Bramshill: Police History Society, pp. 362. (ISBN 978-0951253861)
- Wall, D.S. (ed.) (2009) Crime and Deviance in Cyberspace, Aldershot: Ashgate (International Library of Criminology and Penology). 575 + xxx pp. (ISBN 978-0-7546-2453-0).
- Wall, D.S. (2007) Cybercrime: The transformation of crime in the information age, Cambridge: Polity. 276+xii, ISBN 0-7456-2735-8 (hard back), ISBN 0-7456-2736-6 (paper back).
- Wall, D.S. (ed.) (2003) Cyberspace Crime, Aldershot: Dartmouth/ Ashgate (Dartmouth International Library of Criminology and Penology). 582 + xxvi pp. (ISBN 0-7546-2190-1).
- Wall, D.S. (ed.) (2001) Crime and the Internet, London: Routledge. 221 + xi pp. (ISBN 0415244293) (paper back), (0415244285) (hard back).
- Ryan, M., Savage, S. and Wall. D.S. (eds) (2001) Policy Networks in Criminal Justice, London: Palgrave Macmillan, 226 + xv pp. (ISBN 0 333 750241).
- Akdeniz, Y., Walker, C.P. and Wall. D.S. (eds) (2000) The Internet, Law and Society, London: Longman, 388 + xx pp. (ISBN 0582356563).
- Stallion, M. and Wall, D.S. (1999) The British Police: Police Forces and Chief Officers 1829 -2000, Bramshill: Police History Society, 269 + iv pp. (ISBN 0-9512538-4-0).
- Wall, D.S. (1998) The Chief Constables of England and Wales: The socio-legal history of a criminal justice elite, Aldershot: Dartmouth, 341 + xi pp. (ISBN 1-85521-714-7).
- Young, R. and Wall, D.S. (eds) (1996) Access to Criminal Justice: legal aid, lawyers and the defence of liberty, London: Blackstone Press, 376 +xiv pp. (ISBN 1-85431-502-1).
- Bottomley, A.K. Coleman, C. Dixon, D. Gill, M.L. and Wall, D.S. (1991) The Impact of PACE: Policing in a Northern Force, Hull: Hull University, 198 + vi pp. (ISBN 0-85958-726-6).

Wall was on the editorial board of the European Journal on Criminal Policy and Research (Springer), The Security Journal (Palgrave), The British Journal of Criminology (Oxford University Press), Policing and Society (Taylor and Francis), Criminal Justice Matters (Taylor and Francis). He was also an associate editor of International Review of Law, Computers and Technology (Taylor and Francis).

== Other works ==
Aside from work into Cybercrimes and Criminal Justice, Wall also has an interest in popular cultures. He once played bass guitar in the Fabulous Salamanders and then the 1980s folk rock group God's Little Monkeys (formerly Malcolm's Interview) with whom he recorded 3 albums: Breakfast in Bedlam (Topic Records, 1988); New Maps of Hell (Cooking Vinyl, 1989); LIP (Cooking Vinyl, 1991). Within his academic portfolio of work he has written articles on celebrity cultures and intellectual property rights. See for example, Wall, David S. (2003). "Policing Elvis: legal action and the shaping of post-mortem celebrity culture as contested space" (PDF). Entertainment and Sports Law, 2 (3): pp. 35–69. His most recent research explores Intellectual Property as a driver of deviant and criminal behaviours, see "The Theft of Ideas as a Cybercrime".
