= National Criminal Intelligence Service =

Police agency in the United Kingdom

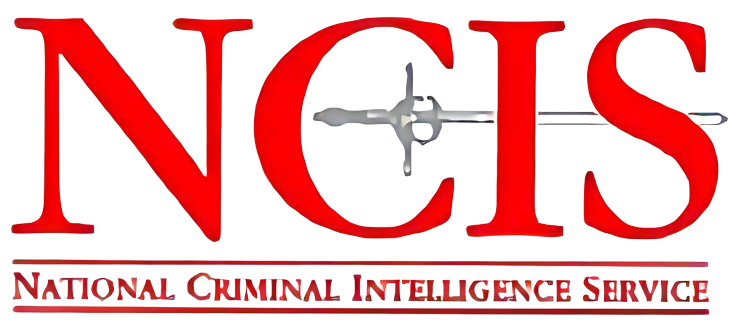
The agency's former logo

The National Criminal Intelligence Service (NCIS) was a United Kingdom policing agency. Following the Police and Criminal Justice Act 2001, NCIS returned to direct funding by the Home Office in 2002 and was a non-departmental public body. On 1 April 2006 it was merged into the newly created Serious Organised Crime Agency. The unit was established in April 1992, previously known as the National Drugs Intelligence Unit. Organised according to the Police Act 1997, the functions of NCIS were to gather intelligence data and analysed this information to provide the necessary insight and intelligence to national police forces. The act also empowered the service with rights to perform surveillance operations.

Organisation of the service included units specialising in organised crimes and crimes involving illicit drugs, football and financial issues. A specialised unit was focused especially on kidnap and extortion, counterfeit money, the stealing of automobiles and paedophilic crimes. At the time of the creation of the service, there was a paedophile unit integral to the organisation of the service. The service consisted of 500 officers.

The service was designed specifically to act against crime classified as both organised in performance and of a serious nature. Relevant groups were to include necessarily:

- at least three people
- engaging in ongoing criminal activity for prolonged periods, something like a "career criminal"
- are motivated in acting to gain in power and for the accumulation of profit.

The service received £138 million in funding during 1999.

The unit was merged with the National Crime Squad and other agencies in 2006 to form SOCA.

The Director General had no responsibility for terrorist responses, which at the time was dealt with by the Security Service (MI5) and Constabulary Special Branches coordinated by the Metropolitan Police Special Branch (MPSB).
