= Restraint order =

A restraint order is an order which has the effect of freezing the assets and bank accounts of the persons against whom it is directed, in consequence of a belief by the authorities that some crime has been committed from which a person has benefited financially.

A restraint order is therefore related to criminal investigations and criminal proceedings. It has some parallels to a Mareva injunction which might be obtained against a defendant in civil proceedings.

== Background ==
The legal basis for restraint orders in England & Wales currently is sections 40 - 47 of the Proceeds of Crime Act 2002. In England & Wales a restraint order under PoCA 2002 would be made in the Crown Court. Restraint orders in other parts of the UK are based on other sections of PoCA 2002 and made in the appropriate court in each jurisdiction.

=== History ===
However restraint orders were provided for in earlier English statute law going back to the Drug Trafficking Offences Act 1986. In relation to suspected criminal conduct which extends back prior to 24 March 2003 (when the relevant provisions of PoCA 2002 came into force) that earlier legislation may still be relevant.

Initially restraint orders were introduced only in relation to suspected drugs offences, but restraint orders for other types of offence were introduced by the Criminal Justice Act 1988. Under the Proceeds of Crime Act 2002 the same procedures apply in both drugs and non-drugs cases.

=== The making of an order ===
A restraint order can be made by a Crown Court judge on the application of a prosecuting or investigating authority. The subjects of the restraint order may be individuals or companies who either are alleged offenders who are believed to have benefited from a criminal offence, or are persons who have received (by way of what is known as a 'tainted gift') an asset from an alleged offender.

A restraint order may be made at any time after a criminal investigation has commenced and there are reasonable grounds to suspect that an individual or company has benefited from criminal conduct. In practice a restraint order will often be obtained at the stage where an investigation has progressed and an arrest is either imminent or has recently been made. A copy of the restraint order has to be served on every subject of it. Where a police investigation is being conducted without the suspect being aware of it, then the police may delay obtaining a restraint order to avoid alerting the suspect to the existence of their ongoing investigation. Once an arrest has been made there is no longer any advantage in delaying obtaining the restraint order. For this reason the restraint order may be obtained shortly before the arrest is made, and served on the suspected offender at the time of his arrest.

=== Purpose and scope of the order ===
The purpose of a restraint order is to prevent the dissipation of assets (for example by them being spent, hidden, given away, or moved out of the country) so that they remain available for confiscation following the conviction of the alleged offender. Typically a restraint order is expressed to cover all assets and bank accounts of the subject anywhere in the world.

=== Effect of the order ===
Technically a restraint order prevents the subject of it from "dealing with" his assets. There is normally a provision in the restraint order allowing the subject to draw and spend a sum of money, typically £250 per week, to meet day to day living expenses.

A restraint order may also contain clauses requiring the subject of the order to disclose information to the authorities concerning his assets.

=== The order document ===
The order itself is likely to be a lengthy legal document. A person served with a restraint order should obtain appropriate legal advice from a suitably experienced solicitor without delay.

=== Breach of the order ===
Breach of a restraint order may result in a fine or imprisonment for contempt of court or perverting the course of justice.

=== Duration of the order ===
A restraint order continues in force until it is discharged (cancelled) by the Crown Court. This could be on an application by the subject of the order, or where proceedings are not brought within a reasonable time as a consequence of a criminal investigation which has not resulted in anyone being charged, or on the acquittal of the alleged offender, or on the satisfaction of any confiscation order made by the Crown Court following the alleged offender’s conviction.
