= Civil recovery =

Legal method of recovering proceeds of crime

Civil recovery is the method in some legal systems employed to recover the proceeds of crime, instead of, or in addition to, criminal court proceedings.

Many retailers, or agents acting on their behalf, utilize civil recovery to recover the value of property (including intellectual property) obtained through unlawful conduct (i.e. theft, burglary, larceny, fraud etc.). In these cases, police action is not a prerequisite to the civil demand for damages by the retailer. The civil demand can be, and often is, made and settled before a civil lawsuit is filed against the shoplifter in the appropriate civil court.

Non-conviction based asset recovery powers are available in some jurisdictions where it is not considered feasible to secure a criminal conviction or a criminal conviction has been obtained but no confiscation order made. These powers are often used in more serious cases of money laundering, organised crime or drug trafficking.

Proponents of civil recovery say it is important to recover the costs incurred through loss from the perpetrators. As well as acting as a deterrent, civil recovery is claimed to cover the cost staff time, administration work and security.

== United Kingdom ==
In the legal systems of the constituent countries of the United Kingdom, the principle of 'civil recovery' (also known as civil recovery scheme or civil recovery regime) is established in law under the Proceeds of Crime Act 2002. Specifically, part 5 of the Act deals with the recovery of the proceeds of crime from unconvicted defendants through proceedings in the civil courts (the High Court, or in Scotland, Court of Session).

According to a report by the Citizen's Advice Bureau, a number of large and well known British companies are known to employ civil recovery proceedings, including, among others, Arcadia Group, BHS, Selfridges & Co, Matalan, Asda and Tesco.

=== Serious and organized crime ===
Section 2A of the Proceeds of Crime Act 2002 grants non-conviction asset seizing powers to relevant agencies (until March 2008, when it was replaced in its role by the Serious Organised Crime Agency, this was the Assets Recovery Agency). The Crown Office & Procurator Fiscal Service says that recovery of funds and items stops them being reinvested into further criminal activity.

The Attorney General's Office advise that these powers should only be used when either a criminal conviction is not feasible, or, if one is, when it is still within the public interest to proceed. Such situations include:

- When "it is not practicable to investigate all of those with a peripheral involvement in the criminality, and a strategic approach must be taken in order to achieve a manageable and successful prosecution"
- When "the only known criminality is overseas, and there is no extra-territorial jurisdiction to pursue a criminal case in the courts of England and Wales or Northern Ireland"
- If "the offender is being prosecuted in another jurisdiction and is expected to receive a sentence that reflects the totality of the offending, so the public interest does not require a prosecution in this country"
- If "proceeds of crime can be identified but cannot be linked to any individual suspect or offence"

In Scotland alone, more than £80 million was recovered between 2003 and 2013.

=== Criticisms ===
The Citizens Advice Bureau has been an outspoken critic of the retail use of civil recovery. They have criticized several of the practices used by retailers and their agents in pursuing civil recovery. In a 2009 report, they cite several cases which they claim illustrated how the procedure is being abused. These include:

- A Tesco employee being dismissed in July 2008 for the alleged theft of £4.00 cash from a till; a subsequent demand letter was then received requesting payment of £191.50. The break down advised that whilst £4.00 was for the value of "the goods or cash stolen", the remaining balance was made up of "staff and management time", "administration costs" and "security and surveillance costs".
- An employee of the now defunct Woolworths being chased for the sum of £187.50 for the theft of items totally £2.00; a demand letter was then received explain that the sum claimed was made up of 'nil' for the value of "the goods or cash stolen". The police were not called and the alleged stolen items were recovered intact.
- Almost one in six claims being made against under 17 year olds.

Some believe that people are ashamed or intimidated by the threat of court action and escalating costs into paying the demand without challenge.

In the case of "A retailer vs Ms B & Ms K", the first civil recovery case to proceed to full trial, Judge Charles Harris QC dismissed the retailers claim, made up almost entirely of £82.50 for "staff/management time investigating and/or dealing with the incident", in its entirety and permission to appeal was refused. The claim was rejected on the principle set out in Aerospace Publishing Limited v Thames Water Utilities Limited [2007], that the claimant had failed to demonstrate that its security staff had been diverted from ordinary duties.

== United States ==
In the United States, civil recovery laws allow store and retailers to prosecute alleged shoplifters in civil court. Every state has a civil recovery law that holds shoplifters liable to pay retailer's any losses as a result of their unlawful actions, and some states amend those laws periodically to increase recovery amounts, in line with inflation. States typically allow a civil recovery demand to be issued to the parents of a minor, holding parents jointly liable for the demand with their minor child.

Many retailers will contract outside, specialized civil recovery firms that, for a fee, may send demands to alleged shoplifters and take further steps to collect unpaid demands. Companies outsource to save time and any expense involved in implementing their own recovery program.

If a civil demand is not paid by the recipient, the issuer of the demand will have the option of filing a lawsuit to collect the demanded sum of money. Some states allow for the recovery of attorney fees if a lawsuit is filed.

=== California ===
California's civil recovery statute is California Penal Code section 490.5(b) and (c). The statute provides that a person who steals merchandise from a merchant or a book from a library may be civilly liable to the merchant or library for between $50 and $500, plus costs, plus the value of the item stolen if it has not been recovered in its original condition.

In California, the parents of a perpetrator may be sued if the crime is committed by an unemancipated minor.

=== Oregon ===
In 1985, the Supreme Court of Oregon, in Payless Drug Stores v. Brown held, that Oregon's civil recovery statute is constitutional.

=== Tennessee ===
Tennessee law allow the recovery of the greater of $100 or twice the value of the stolen item.

=== Wisconsin ===
In Wisconsin, civil recovery is established in statute 943.51. This statute allows for the recovery of up to three times the value of any unrecovered or damaged items plus any legal fees up to the cost of the items and $500 for adults. If the perpetrator is a minor, then the state allows twice the value of the items plus any legal fees up to the cost of the item and $300.

The filing of a prosecution is not required for civil liability, nor does filing of a prosecution preclude a civil action.

== See also ==
- Assets Recovery Agency
- Asset recovery
