= Organised Crime Task Force (Northern Ireland) =

The Organised Crime Task Force is a multi-agency law enforcement agency operating in Northern Ireland. It was established in September 2000. Its role is to set the strategic direction for a multi-agency approach to tackle organised crime in Northern Ireland. Partner agencies include the Police Service of Northern Ireland (PSNI), HM Revenue and Customs, Serious Organised Crime Agency, the Northern Ireland Executive, the Northern Ireland Policing Board, and the Home Office. The Confederation of British Industry, Northern Ireland Chamber of Commerce, Federation of Small Businesses and Criminal Justice System Northern Ireland are also members.

The OCTF issues an Annual Report on its activities.
