= Proceeds of Crime Act 1996 =

The Proceeds of Crime Act, 1996 was an Act of the Oireachtas in Ireland. It deals with the disposal of any property or assets that have been obtained through criminal means. It was designed to deal with organised crime and coincided with the establishment of the Criminal Assets Bureau.
