= Assets Recovery Agency =

Former non-ministerial government department in the United Kingdom

Agency overview
- Formed: February 2003
- Dissolved: 1 April 2008
- Type: Crown status non-ministerial government department
- Parent department: Home Office
- Key document: Proceeds of Crime Act 2002

The Assets Recovery Agency (ARA) was a non-ministerial government department in the United Kingdom. It was established under the Proceeds of Crime Act 2002 (POCA) to reduce crime by confiscating the proceeds of any crime. It was granted a new power of civil recovery through the High Court, and could also take over the powers of the HM Revenue and Customs (HMRC) to levy tax without identifying a source for taxed income.

The ARA became operational in February 2003, but it failed to meet its targets for the confiscation of criminal funds. It was announced in January 2007 that it would be merged with the Serious Organised Crime Agency (SOCA), which was established in 2006. Provisions to achieve this were contained in the Serious Crime Act 2007. There were also proposals for other law enforcement agencies, such as HMRC, to be given similar powers of civil recovery at the same time. On 1 March 2008, the transfer of the Director and staff of the Assets Recovery Agency, its property, rights and liabilities to SOCA and the National Policing Improvement Agency started in anticipation of the Agency's abolition. The agency ceased to exist on 1 April 2008.

== Background ==
The setting up of the ARA was a key aspect of the POCA, which the Government intended to take the profit out of crime, aiming to dismantle and disrupt organised crime gangs by confiscating the financial proceeds of criminal acts. It brings together previous legislation, such as the Drug Trafficking Act 1994 and Part VI of the Criminal Justice Act 1988, with the changes recommended in a comprehensive report of a study conducted by the Performance and Innovation Unit of the Cabinet Office in 2000.

POCA strengthened the legislation relating to seizures of cash, money laundering, investigatory powers, and restraint and confiscation procedures. Previously, only profits from certain crimes, such as drug trafficking, were liable to confiscation.

The Agency had three strategic aims:

- To disrupt organised criminal enterprises through the recovery of criminal assets, thereby alleviating the effects of crime on communities.
- To promote the use of financial investigation as an integral part of criminal investigation, within and outside the Agency, domestically and internationally, through training and continuing professional development.
- To operate the Agency in accordance with its vision and values.

== Powers ==
The powers of the ARA were mostly limited to England and Wales and Northern Ireland, although its taxation powers extended to Scotland. Its main offices were in London, with a second office Belfast. In Northern Ireland, the Director consulted with the Secretary of State for Northern Ireland. In Scotland, civil recovery was achieved through the Civil Recovery Unit of the Scottish Government.

The functions of the ARA were categorised into four types:

- Confiscation proceedings;
- Civil recovery proceedings;
- Taxation of income or gains which are suspected of being derived from criminal activities;
- Control and supervision of the training of financial investigators in the UK.

== Director ==
The ARA was headed by a Director, the first of whom was Jane Earl. Alan McQuillan, a former Assistant Chief Constable in the R.U.C., was appointed as the new director in 2007. The Director had to carry out his statutory functions with a view to the reduction of crime. The Director reported to the Home Secretary, but was operationally independent.

By 2005, it had 180 staff, and an annual budget of £15.5m, but it recovered only £4.6m. It had more success in freezing criminal's assets, with £68.45m frozen in June 2006, but found its actions were frustrated by lengthy and expensive court cases.

== See also ==
- Departments of the United Kingdom Government
- Asset forfeiture
- Criminal Assets Bureau
- British Police
