= National Hi-Tech Crime Unit =

British Police organisation

The National Hi-Tech Crime Unit (NHTCU) previously formed part of the National Crime Squad, a British Police organisation which dealt with major crime.

The National Hi-Tech Crime Unit was created in 2001 as a result of an Association of Chief Police Officers (ACPO) initiative. The organisation investigated serious and organised crime committed over the Internet, such as hacking, carding, virus-writers, internet fraud and other hi-tech crimes involving the use of computers and telecommunications equipment.

On 1 April 2006, it ceased to exist. However, many of its staff and duties were transferred to the e-crime unit of the UK's new Serious Organised Crime Agency (SOCA).

== See also ==
- Police National E-Crime Unit
