= Stephen Kavanagh =

British police officer

Assistant Commissioner Sir Stephen Kavanagh KCMG QPM DL
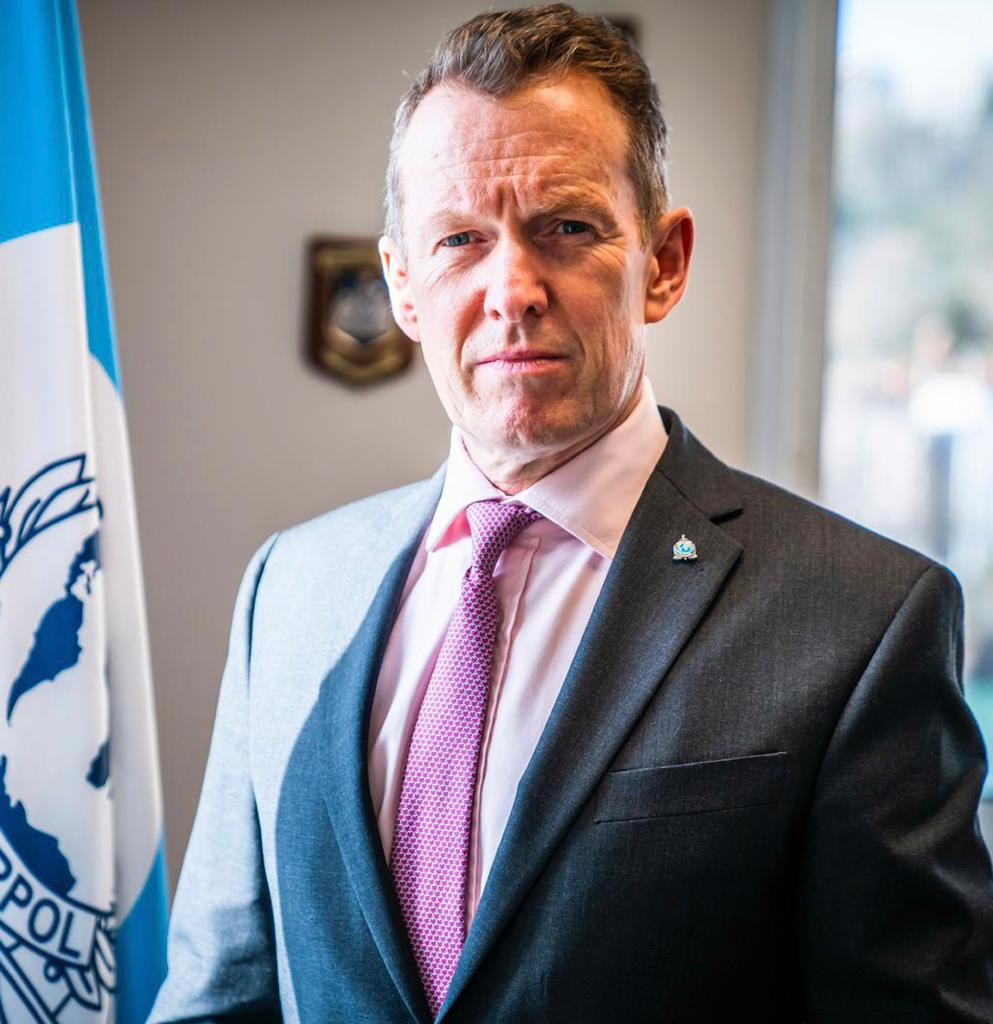
- Born: Stephen Kavanagh; United Kingdom
- Education: University of Cambridge; University of Essex; Anglia Ruskin University
- Police career
- Rank: Chief Constable

Sir Stephen James Kavanagh (/ˈstiːvən/STEE-vən /ˈkævənɑː/ KAV-ə-nah) is a senior-ranking British police officer and was the United Kingdom candidate for the 2024 election of the Secretary General of Interpol. He currently serves as the executive director for police services at Interpol, the second-highest-ranking official. Prior to this role, Kavanagh served as chief constable of Essex Police.

== Education and academic career ==
In 2002, Kavanagh graduated from Wolfson College, Cambridge, with a master's degree in Philosophy and Criminology. From 2016 to 2018, Kavanagh was the Community Chair for Crime, Criminal Justice and Terrorism at the College of Policing. In 2018, Kavanagh became a visiting professor at the Institute for Analytics and Data Science at the University of Essex. In 2019, he was awarded an honorary doctorate of law from Anglia Ruskin University. Kavanagh is currently a Leadership Fellow at St George's House.

== Police career ==
From 1985 to 2013, Kavanagh served in the Metropolitan Police. He worked in the Homicide Command and Anti-Corruption Command, and on the police response to the 7 July 2005 London bombings and the 21 July 2005 London bombings. Kavanagh has held a number of senior roles in the Metropolitan Police, including commander Counter Terrorism, deputy assistant commissioner for Territorial Policing, and deputy assistant commissioner for Specialist Operations, where he worked on London's counter terrorism strategy.

From 2010 to 2014, Kavanagh was the Open Source Intelligence Lead for the Association of Chief Police Officers and led the National Digital Intelligence and Investigations Portfolio, coordinating national and international digital crime co-operation.

From 2013 to 2018, Kavanagh was the chief constable of Essex Police.

From 2015 to 2018, Kavanagh led the National Police Chiefs' Council's Digital Policing Portfolio, which included developing the National Committee for Digital Research and Industrial Co-operation.

Kavanagh is currently serving as assistant commissioner in the Metropolitan Police on secondment to Interpol.

=== Interpol ===
In February 2020, Kavanagh was appointed executive director for police services at Interpol. He is in charge of the four Global Crime programmes: Cybercrime, Counter Terrorism, Organized and Emerging Crime, and Financial Crime & Anti-Corruption. In this role, Kavanagh has overseen large-scale operational initiatives and regional development programmes, including tackling child sexual abuse, cybercrime, wildlife crime, illicit drug operations and targeting most-wanted fugitives. Kavanagh's operations have achieved a record number of drugs seizures, intercepted cybercrime operations worth US$130 million, and executed large-scale operations targeting terrorist suspects and transnational organised crime.

As part of Kavanagh's international responsibilities, he founded a new Interpol Liaison Office for the Caribbean and co-chairs the steering committee for INTERPOL–AFRIPOL relations.

== Philanthropic activities ==
Kavanagh is a patron for JACKs (Joining Against Cancer in Kids) and Open Road, an Essex-based drug and alcohol support service. Kavanagh is a board member of the WeProtect Global Alliance against child sexual abuse and exploitation online. Kavanagh sits on the steering committee for the World Class Policing Awards.

== Honours and awards ==
- Queen's Police Medal (QPM) in 2018 for his distinguished service and contribution to policing in the UK
- Deputy Lieutenant for Essex, 2019
- Order of Police Merit by Spain, 2022

Kavanagh was appointed a Knight Commander of the Order of St Michael and St George (KCMG) in the 2025 Birthday Honours, for services to international policing and public safety.
