= Transcrime =

- Founded: 1994
- Founder: Ernesto Ugo Savona
- Headquarters: Milan, ITA
- Website: www.transcrime.it/en

Transcrime is the Joint Research Centre on Innovation and Crime of the Università Cattolica del Sacro Cuore of Milan, the Alma Mater Studiorum Università di Bologna and the Università degli Studi di Perugia. The Centre, founded by Professor Ernesto Ugo Savona, is based in Milan.

Transcrime is entirely funded by contracts and funding from private corporations and local, national and international public institutions. It employs an integrated approach (criminology, law, economics, statistics, sociology, forensic accounting, data science and IT) to analyse crime phenomena (organised crime, economic crime, money laundering, illegal markets, urban crime), evaluate crime prevention policies, develop risk assessment and crime prevention strategies for public (e.g. law enforcement, public entities) and private actors (e.g. banks, professionals, companies).

Transcrime is also a supporting body of the education activities provided by the Università Cattolica del Sacro Cuore – Milan. In particular, the Centre supports the coordination of the curriculum ‘Criminology’ of the Bachelor’s Degree in Sociology, the curriculum ‘Crime & Security Analysis’ of the Master’s Degree in Public Policy and the International Ph.D. in Criminology.

Crime&tech is the spin-off company established in 2015 by Università Cattolica del Sacro Cuore and the researchers of Transcrime. It develops and applies the research produced by Transcrime into crime prevention solutions for the public and private sector.
