= Proceeds of Crime Act 2002 =

British statute law on confiscation and money laundering

Proceeds of Crime Act 2002 (Note: Section 462.)
- Act of Parliament
- Parliament of the United Kingdom
- Long title: An Act to establish the Assets Recovery Agency and make provision about the appointment of its Director and his functions (including Revenue functions), to provide for confiscation orders in relation to persons who benefit from criminal conduct and for restraint orders to prohibit dealing with property, to allow the recovery of property which is or represents property obtained through unlawful conduct or which is intended to be used in unlawful conduct, to make provision about money laundering, to make provision about investigations relating to benefit from criminal conduct or to property which is or represents property obtained through unlawful conduct or to money laundering, to make provision to give effect to overseas requests and orders made where property is found or believed to be obtained through criminal conduct, and for connected purposes.
- Citation: 2002 c. 29
- Introduced by: David Blunkett (Home Secretary) (Commons); Baroness Scotland QC (Lords)
- Territorial extent: England and Wales; Scotland; Northern Ireland; (Note: Section 461.)

Dates
- Royal assent: 24 July 2002
- Commencement: 24 March 2003
Other legislation
Amends	Misuse of Drugs Act 1971; Limitation Act 1980; Civil Jurisdiction and Judgments Act 1982; Criminal Justice Act 1988; Criminal Justice Act 1993; Pension Schemes (Northern Ireland) Act 1993; Drug Trafficking Act 1994; Proceeds of Crime Act 1995; Criminal Procedure (Scotland) Act 1995; Proceeds of Crime (Scotland) Act 1995; Criminal Procedure (Consequential Provisions) (Scotland) Act 1995; Private International Law (Miscellaneous Provisions) Act 1995; Police Act 1996; Crime and Disorder Act 1998; Access to Justice Act 1999; Terrorism Act 2000; Proceeds of Crime Act 2002
Amended by	Crime (International Co-operation) Act 2003; Asylum and Immigration (Treatment of Claimants, etc.) Act 2004; Work and Families Act 2006; Serious Crime Act 2007; Counter-Terrorism Act 2008; Co-operative and Community Benefit Societies Act 2014; Criminal Justice and Courts Act 2015; Modern Slavery Act 2015; Investigatory Powers Act 2016; Criminal Finances Act 2017; Sentencing (Pre-consolidation Amendments) Act 2020; Sentencing Act 2020; Economic Crime (Transparency and Enforcement) Act 2022; Economic Crime and Corporate Transparency Act 2023; Border Security, Asylum and Immigration Act 2025
Relates to	Serious Organised Crime and Police Act 2005; Serious Crime Act 2015

Status: Amended

Records of Parliamentary debate relating to the statute from Hansard, at TheyWorkForYou

Text of statute as originally enacted

Revised text of statute as amended

The Proceeds of Crime Act 2002 (c. 29) (POCA) is an act of the Parliament of the United Kingdom which provides for the confiscation or civil recovery of the proceeds from crime and contains the principal money laundering legislation in the UK.

== Background ==
The act was enacted following the publication on 14 June 2000 of new government policy as set out in the Performance and Innovation Unit's report "Recovering the Proceeds of Crime". It deals with a wide range of matters relevant to UK law on proceeds of crime issues. These include confiscation orders against convicted individuals (requiring payment to the State based upon the benefit obtained from their crimes), civil recovery of proceeds of crime from unconvicted individuals, taxation of profits generated from crime, UK anti-money laundering legislation, powers of investigation into suspected proceeds of crime offences, and international co-operation by UK law enforcement agencies against money laundering.

The act has been amended since 2002, most particularly by the Serious Organised Crime and Police Act 2005, the Serious Crime Act 2007 and the Serious Crime Act 2015.

The money laundering provisions in Part 7 of the act are supported by the Money Laundering, Terrorist Financing and Transfer of Funds (Information on the Payer) Regulations 2017.

Amongst other things, the act simplified the conviction of criminals suspected of money laundering because prior to its being enacted prosecutors had to work with two different statutory regimes: the Drug Trafficking Act 1994 for laundering of the proceeds of drug trafficking, and the Criminal Justice Act 1988 as amended by the Criminal Justice Act 1993 and the Proceeds of Crime Act 1995 for proceeds of other crimes. In essence prior to the implementation of the act a prosecuting lawyer had to prove that the moneys or assets were the proceeds of crime and also what 'type' of crime the proceeds came from (i.e. either drug crime or non-drug crime). The act removed the need to make a distinction between these types as the source of the proceeds in relation to alleged money laundering in the UK commencing after 24 February 2003.

The Assets Recovery Agency created by the act became part of the Serious Organised Crime Agency in March 2008. In turn SOCA became part of a new National Crime Agency for the UK in 2013.

The act is split into 12 parts. Some of these parts apply to the entire UK (such as Part 7 dealing with money laundering), although other parts apply only to one jurisdiction within the UK (so Part 2 relates to confiscation in England & Wales, Part 3 relates to confiscation in Scotland, Part 4 relates to confiscation in Northern Ireland).

The first act of Parliament for England and Wales aimed at stripping criminals of illegally acquired gains was the Drug Trafficking Offences Act 1986. Scotland was provided with similar powers under the Criminal Justice (Scotland) Act 1987. These acts of Parliament were introduced following the House of Lords ruling that under the law as it then was some £750,000 had to be returned to a gang of drug dealers. These proceeds had been traced to the defendants in a police operation codenamed "Operation Julie" in 1978. Powers for the courts to confiscate proceeds of crime were extended under the Criminal Justice Act 1988 and the Criminal Justice (Scotland) Act 1995. These Acts provided the courts with powers to confiscate proceeds of crime where an offence had been committed other than drug trafficking offences, in specified circumstances. Powers for the courts in Northern Ireland to confiscate proceeds in both drug trafficking and other offences was introduced by Criminal Justice (Confiscation) (Northern Ireland) Order 1990. These acts were amended by: Criminal Justice Act 1993, the Drug Trafficking Act 1994, the Proceeds of Crime Act 1995, the Proceeds of Crime (Scotland) Act 1995 and the Proceeds of Crime (Northern Ireland) Order 1996.

== Passage of the Bill ==
The Proceeds of Crime Bill was introduced to the House of Commons by the Home Secretary, David Blunkett, on 18 October 2001. It was given royal assent on 24 July 2002.

== Provisions of the act ==
=== Part 1 ===
Sections 1 – 5 of the act provides for the establishment of the Assets Recovery Agency and for the Secretary of State to appoint its director. The section gives the director power to employ staff and delegate his function to staff to carry out his role. The office of director has legal personality representing the agency as a whole in much the same manner as the office of chief constable or responsible minister for their respective public bodies, and would therefore be named as a party in any legal case involving the department e.g. Stoner v Director of the Assets Recovery Agency. The section makes it clear that director must pay attention to guidance given by the Secretary of State which is calculated to contribute to the reduction of crime. The Assets Recovery Agency was provided with completely new powers by the Proceeds of Crime Act 2002. The new powers allow the Assets Recovery Agency to use the civil court procedures to recover the proceeds of unlawful conduct by way of an action in the High Court. Where there are reasonable grounds to suspect there is taxable income gain or profit the Agency also has the power to issue tax assessments.

The Assets Recovery Agency created by the 2002 Act became part of the Serious Organised Crime Agency in 2008. In turn, SOCA became part of the National Crime Agency for the UK in 2013.

=== Parts 2, 3 & 4 ===
Part 2, sections 6 – 91, deals with the transfer of power to make confiscation orders from the magistrates' court and High Court to the Crown Court. Applications for restraint orders or charging orders are heard in the Crown Court. The magistrates' court must commit confiscation cases to the Crown Court. These changes apply to offences committed after the commencement of this part of the act on 23 March 2003. Confiscation or restraint proceedings for offences committed before 23 March 2003 would be dealt with under the regimes outlined in either the Drug Trafficking Act 1994 or Criminal Justice Act 1988. For offences committed over a period of time, which is typically the case where an acquisitive fraud has been committed, then the relevant date is the start date of the offence. Legislation has now been passed by Parliament which would allow the magistrates' court to deal with confiscation cases which have a value of up to £10,000. However, this has yet to be implemented.

In essence a confiscation order is an order of the Crown Court requiring the convicted defendant to pay to the state a specified sum of money by a specified date (no later than 12 months after the date on which the order is made reduced to 6 months with effect from 1 June 2015). The Crown Court is obliged to make a confiscation order if requested to do so by the prosecutor following the conviction of the defendant of an offence from which he has obtained a benefit.

The Crown Court must normally establish (i) the benefit obtained by the defendant and (ii) the defendant's available amount. The confiscation order must then be made in the recoverable amount which is the lesser of these two figures. The act provides rules for the determination both of the benefit obtained and the defendant's available amount. In relation to benefit the court is obliged to apply the statutory assumptions set out in section 10 if the defendant has a criminal lifestyle. A defendant has a criminal lifestyle if, and only if, he meets the criteria of section 75. A criminal lifestyle may be established by the conviction of the defendant of a single offence.

The defendant's available amount is typically the market value of all his assets less the amount of any liabilities which are secured upon those assets. Unsecured liabilities are not deducted in arriving at the defendant's available amount.

If the court is unable to establish the defendant's available amount it must make a confiscation order in the amount of the benefit.

The burden falls broadly upon the prosecution to establish the defendant's benefit and upon the defendant to establish his available amount. In practice, the prosecutor will in the first instance attempt to assist the court to establish both figures.

If the defendant fails to pay the sum ordered by the due date then payment may be enforced by various means and interest will commence to run on the amount unpaid. One of the means of enforcement is that an additional prison sentence (maximum 10 years –14 years, with effect from 1 June 2015) may be imposed for failure to pay on time.

Part 2 also includes provisions relating to the making of restraint orders and the appointment of enforcement receivers. Restraint orders are draconian in nature and the jurisdiction is unfamiliar to the Crown Court and to many criminal practitioners having previously been exercised by the High Court. However, such orders may be challenged to considerable effect as the case of Windsor v Crown Prosecution Service demonstrates.

Part 2 of the act applies in England and Wales. Parts 3 & 4 of the act apply similar provisions to Scotland and Northern Ireland but in a modified form to suit the different legal traditions and structures in those jurisdictions.

However, although the statute law is very similar, the operation of confiscation in practice in Scotland in 'criminal lifestyle' cases – particularly in relation to the computation of the offender's 'benefit' for confiscation purposes – has been very different from that in England and Wales.

=== Part 5 ===
Part 5 of the act deals with the civil recovery of the proceeds of crime from unconvicted defendants through proceedings in the civil courts (the High Court or, in Scotland, Court of Session).

It includes powers relating to the seizure, detention and forfeiture of cash sums in excess of the 'minimum amount' (currently £1,000). In this context cash is widely defined to include not only banknotes and coins of any currency but also cheques, including travellers' cheques and bank drafts. These proceedings are held in the magistrates' court or (in Scotland) before the sheriff.

Part 5 applies throughout the UK.

=== Part 6 ===
Part 6 relates to taxation powers where it is suspected that profits or gains have arisen as a result of criminal activities.

When the Serious Organised Crime Agency has reasonable grounds to suspect that taxable income or chargeable gains have arisen to a person in one or more tax years as a result (wholly or partly and directly or indirectly) of criminal conduct (whether conduct by that person or by another) they may adopt taxation powers in respect of that person for those tax year(s) under Part 6. Having adopted those powers they (in addition to HM Revenue and Customs) may issue tax assessments (covering both legitimate and illegitimate income and gains).

The tax assessments are subject to appeal in the same way as tax assessments issued by HM Revenue and Customs except that it is not necessary for tax assessments made under Part 6 to specify the source of the income or gains assessed. Appeal is to the First-tier Tribunal (Tax Chamber).

An appeal can also be made on the grounds that the adoption of taxation powers by SOCA was invalid in the appellant's case.

Part 6 applies throughout the UK.

=== Part 7 ===
Part 7 of the act contains the primary UK anti-money laundering legislation, including provisions requiring businesses within the 'regulated sector' (banking, investment, money transmission, certain professions, etc.) to report to the authorities suspicions of money laundering by customers or others.

Money laundering is widely defined in the UK. In effect any handling or involvement with any proceeds of any crime (or monies or assets representing the proceeds of crime) can be a money laundering offence. An offender's possession of the proceeds of his own crime falls within the UK definition of money laundering. The definition also covers activities which would fall within the traditional definition of money laundering as a process by which proceeds of crime are concealed or disguised so that they may be made to appear to be of legitimate origin.

Unlike certain other jurisdictions (notably the US and much of Europe), UK money laundering offences are not limited to the proceeds of serious crimes, nor are there any monetary limits, nor is there any necessity for there to be a money laundering design or purpose to an action for it to amount to a money laundering offence. A money laundering offence under UK legislation need not involve money, since the money laundering legislation covers assets of any description. Technically therefore an individual who steals even a paper clip in the UK commits a money laundering offence (possession of the stolen paper clip) in addition to the predicate offence (of theft of the paper clip).

In consequence any person who commits an acquisitive crime (i.e. one from which he obtains some benefit in the form of money or an asset of any description) in the UK will inevitably also commit a money laundering offence under UK legislation.

This applies also to a person who, by criminal conduct, evades a liability (such as a taxation liability) – referred to by lawyers as "obtaining a pecuniary advantage" – as he is deemed thereby to obtain a sum of money equal in value to the liability evaded.

The principal money laundering offences carry a maximum penalty of 14 years imprisonment.

One consequence of the act is that banks, as well as professional firms such as solicitors, accountants, and insolvency practitioners, who suspect (as a consequence of information received in the course of their work) that their customers or clients (or others) have engaged in tax evasion or other criminal conduct from which a benefit has been obtained, are now required to report their suspicions to the authorities (since these entail suspicions of money laundering). In most circumstances it would be an offence, 'tipping-off', for the reporter to inform the subject of his report that a report has been made. These provisions do not however require disclosure to the authorities of information received by certain professionals in privileged circumstances or where the information is subject to legal professional privilege.

There is however, under UK legislation, no obligation upon banks or others to routinely report all deposits or transfers having a value greater than a specified amount even in the absence of any suspicion that money laundering may be involved (as there is in some other countries).

The reporting obligations in Part 7 include reporting suspicions relating to gains from conduct carried out abroad which would be criminal if it took place in the UK. Exceptions were later added to exempt certain activities which were legal in the location where they took place, such as bullfighting in Spain.

There are more than 200,000 reports of suspected money laundering submitted annually to the authorities in the UK (there were 240,582 reports in the year ended 30 September 2010 – an increase from the 228,834 reports submitted in the previous year). Most of these reports are submitted by banks and similar financial institutions (there were 186,897 reports from the banking sector in the year ended 30 September 2010).

Although 5,108 different organisations submitted suspicious activity reports to SOCA in the year ended 30 September 2010 just four organisations submitted approximately half of all reports, and the top 20 reporting organisations accounted for three-quarters of all reports.

The offence of failing to report a suspicion of money laundering by another person carries a maximum penalty of 5 years imprisonment and/or a fine.

Part 7 applies throughout the UK.

The person in a company responsible for receiving employees' reports of their suspicions and ensuring that, when appropriate, the information or other matter leading to knowledge or suspicion, or reasonable grounds for knowledge or suspicion, of money laundering is properly disclosed to the relevant authority is referred to in the legislation as the "nominated officer" but in practice is more commonly known as the Money laundering reporting officer (MLRO).

=== Parts 8 – 12 ===
Parts 8 to 12 of the act make further provisions with regard to investigation of suspected offences, international co-operation, etc.

Importantly it is a criminal offence to impede a money laundering investigation by the authorities by the concealing, destroying or falsifying of documents relevant to the investigation or by the making of a disclosure of information which prejudices the investigation. The offence carries a maximum punishment of 5 years imprisonment.
