= Serious Organised Crime Agency =

Non-departmental public body of the UK government from 2006-13

- Abbreviation: SOCA

Agency overview
- Formed: 1 April 2006
- Preceding agencies: National Crime Squad; National Criminal Intelligence Service; National Hi-Tech Crime Unit; Serious drug trafficking investigative and intelligence sections of HM Revenue & Customs; Immigration Service's responsibilities for organised immigration crime
- Dissolved: 7 October 2013
- Superseding agency: National Crime Agency
- Employees: 4,200
- Annual budget: £494M (2008/09)

Jurisdictional structure
- National agency (Operations jurisdiction): United Kingdom
- Operations jurisdiction: United Kingdom
- United Kingdom
- Area: 244,821 square kilometres (94,526 sq mi)
- Population: 60,609,153
- Legal jurisdiction: England and Wales, Scotland and Northern Ireland

Operational structure
- Overseen by: The SOCA Board
- Headquarters: London, England
- Agency executive: Trevor Pearce, Director-General
- Child agency: Child Exploitation and Online Protection Centre

Website
- web.archive.org/*/http://www.soca.gov.uk

The Serious Organised Crime Agency (SOCA) was a non-departmental public body of the Government of the United Kingdom which existed from 1 April 2006 until 7 October 2013. SOCA was a national law enforcement agency with Home Office sponsorship, established as a body corporate under Section 1 of the Serious Organised Crime and Police Act 2005. It operated within the United Kingdom and collaborated (through its network of international offices) with many foreign law enforcement and intelligence agencies.

The Agency was formed following a merger of the National Crime Squad, the National Criminal Intelligence Service (elements of which were incorporated into AVCIS), the National Hi-Tech Crime Unit (NHTCU), the investigative and intelligence sections of HM Revenue & Customs on serious drug trafficking, and the Immigration Service's responsibilities for organised immigration crime. The Assets Recovery Agency became part of SOCA in 2008, while the Serious Fraud Office remained a separate agency.

SOCA Officers could be designated the powers of a constable, customs officer or immigration officer and/or any combination of these three sets of powers. The Director General of SOCA (or his designate) was responsible for determining which powers were given to members of staff which could be altered depending on the nature of the investigation. Those police powers requiring a constable to be in uniform could not be exercised by SOCA Officers as the agency was non-uniformed.

SOCA operated with greater powers in England and Wales than in Scotland and Northern Ireland and as such worked with the Scottish Crime and Drug Enforcement Agency and the Organised Crime Task Force (Northern Ireland), which shared some of its functions in their respective jurisdictions.

In June 2011, the coalition government announced that SOCA's operations would be merged into a larger National Crime Agency to launch in 2013. The new agency, created through the Crime and Courts Act 2013, commenced operations on 7 October 2013.

== Overview ==
The creation of the agency was announced on 9 February 2004 as one of the elements of the Serious Organised Crime and Police Act 2005, which also restricts protests and demonstrations in central London, and alters powers of arrest and the use of search warrants. According to Home Office figures organised crime costs the UK around £20 billion each year, with some estimates putting the figure as high as £40 billion.

SOCA had a national remit and the role of the agency was to support individual police forces in the investigation of crime and conduct independent investigations with regard to serious organised crime. SOCA was an agency which had the role of "reducing harm", not specifically the arrest and conviction of offenders.

Elements of the media attempted to draw parallels between the organisation and the Federal Bureau of Investigation of the United States: indeed, parts of the press labelled SOCA the "British FBI."

SOCA was subject to similar internal and external governance mechanisms as the police service. The SOCA Professional Standards Department was responsible for receiving, investigating and monitoring the progress of public complaints about the misconduct of SOCA officers. Serious complaints regarding SOCA were dealt with by the Independent Police Complaints Commission (IPCC) now the Independent Office of Police Conduct (IOPC). The IPCC would decide the appropriate method of investigation. In general terms, the IPCC would handle complaints against SOCA officers in the same manner as complaints against police officers or officers of HMRC. The Police Ombudsman of Northern Ireland (PONI) dealt with complaints in Northern Ireland. In Scotland, this was the responsibility of the Lord Advocate. There was also a bespoke inspection regime for SOCA, provided through Her Majesty's Inspectorate of Constabulary (HMIC).

== Governance ==
The agency was an executive non-departmental public body sponsored by, but operationally independent from, the Home Office. It was funded by the UK's central government, with a provisional budget for 2006/7 of £457 million, of which £416 million funded ongoing resources and £41 million was capital investment. At formation it was intended to have around 4,200 employees, of which 400 were support staff. Of the remaining workforce, half would be criminal investigators and the other half would focus on analysis and intelligence. SOCA co-operated closely with the police, intelligence agencies, HM Revenue & Customs, foreign police forces and others.

SOCA was led by a board comprising non-executive and executive members. The founding non-executive chairman, responsible for the overall approach of the Agency, was Sir Stephen Lander, former Director General of the Security Service (MI5). Lander was succeeded by Sir Ian Andrews, a former MOD Civil Servant. The other original non-executive directors of the board were Stephen Barrett, Elizabeth France, Ken Jarrold, Janet Paraskeva and General Sir Roger Wheeler. Prior to closure, the non-executive directors were Peter Clarke, Sue Garrard, Francis Plowden and Dr Martyn Thomas. The original executive directors of the board were David Bolt, Malcolm Cornberg, Paul Evans and Trevor Pearce, and today they are Malcolm Cornberg, Paul Evans, Trevor Pearce and Brad Jones. The agency's headquarters were in Victoria, not far from New Scotland Yard. There was also an office in Vauxhall, South London, not far from the Palace of Westminster and the SIS Building.

The founding Director General was Bill Hughes, formerly of the National Crime Squad. Hughes retired in 2010 and was succeeded by Trevor Pearce, who until then was Executive Director of SOCA's Enforcement Directorate.

The board directed that around 40% of its effort should be devoted to combating drug trafficking, 25% to tackling organised immigration crime, around 10% to fraud, 15% on other organised crime and the remaining 10% on supporting other law enforcement agencies.

== Organisation ==
The organisation was split into three major directorates:

- Strategy and Prevention - Responsible for driving SOCA strategy and reflecting government priorities. Bringing together those functions focussed on preventative activity with partners such as disruption of criminal activities and denial of assets.
- Operational Delivery - Responsible for identifying how and where the desired impact and response can be achieved, planning and executing operations and the subsequent criminal justice and other disruptive interventions.
- Capability and Service Delivery - Supporting activities

The Agency had to deal with the effects of significant budget cuts that have affected both its strategy for dealing with organised crime and its ability to retain experienced police officers.

The Child Exploitation and Online Protection Centre (CEOP) operated as an independent component of SOCA and was staffed by SOCA officers. The task of online child protection had previously been (in part) the responsibility of the NHTCU. CEOP recently announced the opening of the CEOP Academy, designed to be a centre of excellence in this area of law enforcement. CEOP works in conjunction with New Scotland Yard Child Abuse Investigation Command which has its own hi-tech unit.

On 1 April 2012, the Missing Persons Bureau, Central Witness Bureau, Specialist Operations Centre, Crime Operational Support and Serious Crime Analysis Section transferred from the National Policing Improvement Agency to SOCA, as an interim measure ahead of the proposed establishment of the National Crime Agency in 2013. CEOP became an independent command of the National Crime Agency when it began operations on 7 October 2013.

== Operations ==
=== National Central Bureau ===
SOCA acted as the UK point of contact for Interpol, Europol and the Schengen Information System.

In this capacity SOCA maintained the following functions:

- Single point of contact for International enquiries from SOCA and all UK Police and law enforcement agencies
- 24/7 capacity for Interpol with direct connections to their databases and provides a specialist service to Europol through Europol Liaison Officers
- Coordination of all inbound and outbound Cross Border Surveillance requests with Schengen partners
- Dedicated Fugitives Unit that acts as the UK Central Authority for all European Arrest Warrants

=== Serious Crime Analysis Section (SCAS) ===
The Serious Crime Analysis Section moved to SOCA from the National Policing Improvement Agency on 1 April 2012 in advance of the planned establishment of the National Crime Agency in 2013. SCAS is based at Foxley Hall in the grounds of the Police Staff College, Bramshill in Hampshire. It was originally formed by the Home Office in 1998 to identify the potential emergence of serial killers and serial rapists at the earliest stage of their offending. This scope has since broadened to include the analysis by specialist staff of rapes, serious sexual assaults and motiveless or sexually motivated murders.

Criminal case files are received by SCAS from all police forces in the UK at an early stage in the investigations. The information is coded and placed on a single database, ViCLAS (Violent Crime Linkage Analysis System). The system was developed in Canada by the Royal Canadian Mounted Police.

The investigating officer receives a report from a crime analyst with a number of key elements designed to assist the investigation. It will identify if there are grounds to believe that the offender has previously been identified. It will also provide a breakdown of the behaviour exhibited in the offence, often with a statistical description of some of the elements involved. This can alert an investigator to the importance of some aspects of the offence not immediately apparent. SCAS are also responsible for identifying good practice, or "what works", so the analyst's report may contain "investigative suggestions" that might guide the officer to a specific line of enquiry not yet considered. The report may also suggest possible suspects that the unit has identified from a number of databases. When a prime suspect has been identified and charged with an offence, senior analysts are able to provide specialist evidence in court, to assist with the prosecution of offenders.

=== Crime Operational Support ===
The Crime Operational Support unit also moved to SOCA, and provides specialist operational skills and to assist in the resolution of exceptional crime series and operational critical incidents.

Four regional teams of investigative advisers support regional investigations, and are themselves supported by the specialist skills of crime investigation officers, behavioural investigative advisers and geographic profilers. The unit identifies best practice in investigations, and makes these known through workshops and seminars.

=== Missing Persons Bureau ===
The Missing Persons Bureau (MPB) transferred to SOCA in April 2012 along with SCAS. It had previously been based at New Scotland Yard until April 2008 when it was moved to the NPIA and based in Bramshill.

The bureau acts as the centre for the exchange of information connected with the search for missing persons nationally and internationally. It is responsible for cross-matching missing persons with unidentified persons or bodies, as well as maintaining an index of dental records of missing persons and unidentified bodies.

The MPB also manages a missing persons and Child Rescue Alert website, and analyses data to identify trends and patterns in disappearances.

=== National Injuries Database ===
The National Injuries Database also transferred from the NPIA. It provides additional support to police forces by providing analysis of weapons and wounds, and seeking to identify similarities to aid investigators in determining which weapon may have been used. The database holds over 4,000 cases of suspicious deaths, murders and clinical cases, and contains over 20,000 images.

=== Money laundering ===
SOCA via the UK Financial Intelligence Unit took over responsibility for dealing with suspicious activity reports (SARs), previously made to the National Criminal Intelligence Service (NCIS) under money laundering legislation.

NCIS received just under 200,000 SARs in 2005 and throughout its active life was widely critical of the banking and financial services sector, and the Financial Services Authority, for not being more transparent or forthcoming in reporting their customers' suspicious activity.

Despite criticism from professional representative bodies that the disclosure rules are too broad, SOCA has said that up to one in three SARs lead to or add substantially to terrorism investigations; that HMRC estimates that around one in five SARs identifies new subjects of interest, and one in four SARs lead to direct tax enquiries; and that many arrests and confiscations of criminal assets.

The Assets Recovery Agency became part of the Serious Organised Crime Agency from April 2008. The power to launch civil recovery proceedings has been extended to the three main prosecutors in England and Wales; the Crown Prosecution Service (CPS), the Revenue and Customs Prosecutions Office (RCPO) and the Serious Fraud Office (SFO). It will also be extended to the Public Prosecution Service in Northern Ireland and the Crown Office and Procurator Fiscal Service in Scotland.

=== Computer crime ===
Officers from the former National Hi-Tech Crime Unit (NHTCU) became SOCA's e-crime unit. However, the remit of this unit is much narrower than that of the body it replaced. In particular, the NHTCU had established a confidentiality charter to encourage victims of computer crime to contact the police in confidence, because many corporate victims in particular do not report attacks due to fears of bad publicity. The loss of the confidentiality charter has been widely criticised. although similar protection is now provided by the same Act of Parliament used to create SOCA. The Metropolitan Police is to help bridge the gap left by the disbandment of the NHTCU through an expansion of its Computer Unit and the formation of the Police Central e-crime Unit (PCeU), which will work closely with the new National Fraud Reporting Centre (NFRC) from 2009.

== Website outages ==
The SOCA public information website, hosted by a third party, was subjected to a number of Distributed denial-of-service attack (DDOS) attacks. Hacker group LulzSec claimed responsibility for the attack on 20 June 2011, including a suggestion that the DDOS attack was a cover for real hacking.

== See also ==
- Bent Coppers, detailing police corruption within the Metropolitan Police Service and South Eastern Regional Crime Squad
- Forensic Science Service
- Human trafficking
- LGC Ltd
- List of law enforcement agencies in the United Kingdom, Crown Dependencies and British Overseas Territories
- List of special response units
- National Ballistics Intelligence Service
- Police Central e-Crime Unit
- National Policing Improvement Agency
- Police intelligence
- Scottish Crime and Drug Enforcement Agency
