= Roberts baronets =

Set index for Roberts baronets

There have been nine baronetcies created for persons with the surname Roberts, three in the Baronetage of England and six in the Baronetage of the United Kingdom. As of 2026 four of the creations are extant.

- Roberts baronets of Glassenbury (1620)
- Roberts baronets of Willesdon (1661)
- Roberts baronets of Bow (1681)
- Roberts baronets of Glassenbury and Britfieldstown (1809)
- Roberts baronets of the Army (1881): see Earl Roberts
- Roberts baronets of Brynwenalt of Kilmaron (1908): see Baron Clwyd
- Roberts baronets of Milner Field (1909)
- Roberts baronets of Ecclesall and Queen's Tower (1919)
- Roberts baronets of Martholme (1931)
