= Thurrock (disambiguation) =

Thurrock is a unitary authority area with borough status in the ceremonial county of Essex, England.

Thurrock may also refer to:

- Thurrock Council, the local authority of Thurrock
- Thurrock (UK Parliament constituency)
- Thurrock Urban District, a former district from 1936 to 1974
- Thurrock F.C., a football club in Thurrock
