= Thurrock =

Borough in Essex, England

Thurrock Borough of Thurrock
- Unitary authority area and borough
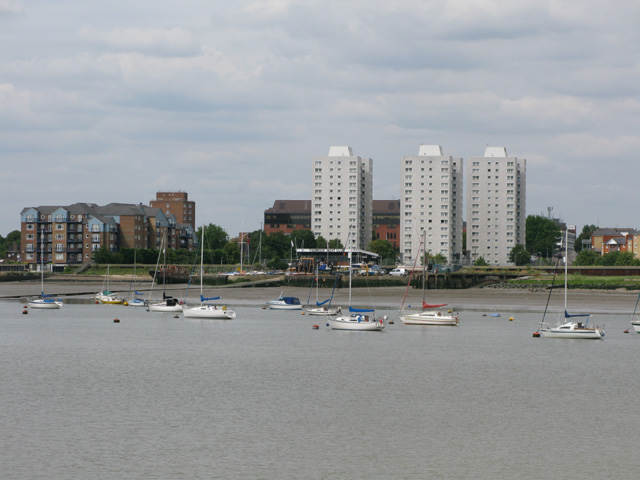
- Grays town skyline

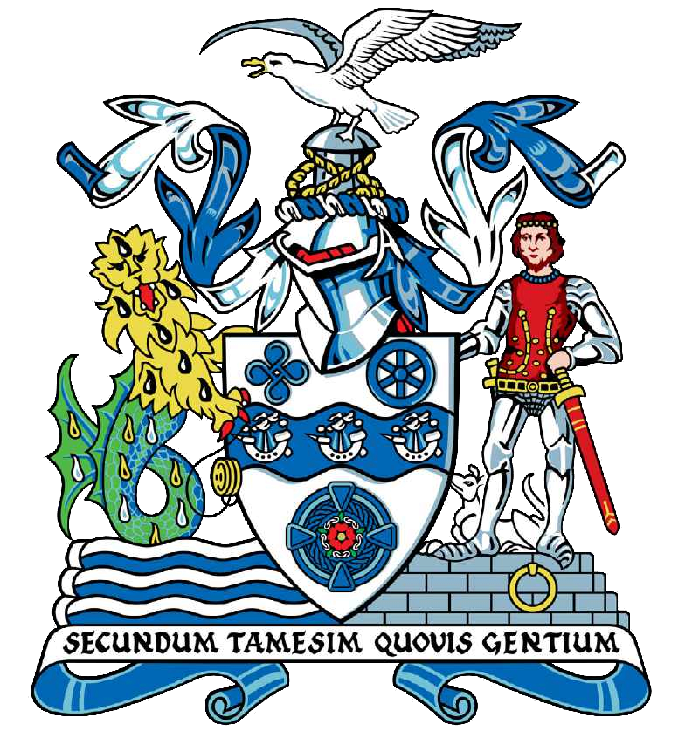
- Coat of arms

- Shown within Essex
- Interactive map of Thurrock
- Coordinates: 51°30′00″N 0°25′00″E
- Country: United Kingdom
- Constituent country: England
- Region: East
- Ceremonial county: Essex
- Admin HQ: Grays

Government
  - Body: Thurrock Council
  - MPs: Jen Craft (Labour); James McMurdock (Independent)

Area
  - Total: 63.08 sq mi (163.38 km^{2})

Population
  - Total: Ranked 119th 181,664
  - Density: 2,870/sq mi (1,109/km^{2})

Ethnicity (2021)
  - Ethnic groups: List: 76.7% White; 11.9% Black; 6.9% Asian; 3% Mixed; 1.5% other

Religion (2021)
  - Religion: List: 51.7% Christianity; 34.7% no religion; 8.7% other; 4.9% Islam
- Time zone: GMT
  - Summer (DST): British Summer Time
- ISO 3166 code: GB-THR
- ONS code: 00KG (ONS); E06000034 (GSS)
- Website: thurrock.gov.uk

Thurrock (/ˈθʌrək/) is a unitary authority area with borough status in the ceremonial county of Essex, England. It lies on the north bank of the River Thames immediately east of London and has over 18 miles (29 km) of riverfront including the Port of Tilbury, the principal port for London. Thurrock is within the London commuter belt and is an area of regeneration within the Thames Gateway redevelopment zone. The borough includes the northern ends of the Dartford Crossing.

Its largest town and administrative headquarters is Grays (also called Grays Thurrock), where the local authority Thurrock Council is based. The borough also includes the towns Purfleet-on-Thames, South Ockendon, Stanford-le-Hope and Tilbury, as well as other villages and surrounding areas. More than half of the borough is designated as Green Belt.

The neighbouring districts are the London Borough of Havering, Brentwood, Basildon and Castle Point. On the opposite side of the Thames are Gravesham and Dartford in Kent.

== History ==
Mammoths once grazed in the Thurrock area and archaeologists unearthed the remains of a jungle cat. Humans have lived in the area since prehistoric times and the land has been farmed by the Romans and Anglo-Saxons. Thurrock has numerous archaeological sites including the major excavation at Mucking. The name "Thurrock" is a Saxon name meaning "the bottom of a ship".

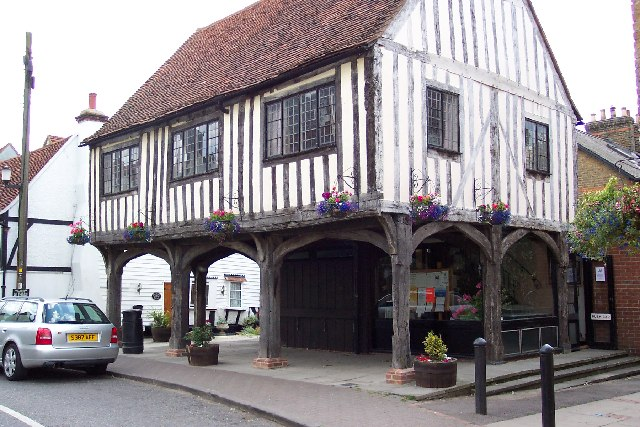
The Woolmarket, Horndon-on-the-Hill

Horndon-on-the-Hill was the site of an 11th century mint as well as the 15th century woolmarket which gives an indication of the area's wealth in the 15th century. The narrowing of the river where Tilbury now stands meant it was important in the defence of London, and Henry VIII built three blockhouses, two on the Tilbury side and another on the Gravesend side of the river, following the end of his marriage to Catherine of Aragon.

In 1381, villagers from Fobbing, Mucking and Stanford-le-Hope instigated the Peasants' Revolt when they were called to Brentwood to pay the poll tax. When they refused to pay, a riot ensued which was the catalyst for a mass protest across Essex and Kent.

Later, in 1588 Elizabeth I addressed her troops not far from the Tilbury blockhouse as the Spanish Armada sailed up the English Channel. Between 1670 and 1682, the Tilbury blockhouse was substantially rebuilt into a much larger fortification (Tilbury Fort) and Coalhouse Fort was built further down river, close to the second blockhouse. The importance of the forts in defending the country continued through Napoleonic times and into the two world wars. The land where Tilbury Town now stands was farmland and marsh grazing until the building of the docks in the 1890s. Thurrock includes the Bata village, built for workers of the shoe company in 1933. Eight homes and the factory are listed.

Historically, the area was renowned for mineral extraction, including clay, aggregates and notably the digging of huge amounts of chalk from the West Thurrock area for use in the now defunct cement industries. When chalk extraction ceased one of the disused pits was redeveloped as Lakeside Shopping Centre. A number of former pits have been used to form the Chafford Gorges Nature Reserve, managed by the Essex Wildlife Trust.

=== Captain Kidd ===
The body of Captain Kidd was displayed in Thurrock. He had been convicted of piracy and hanged on 23 May 1701, at 'Execution Dock', Wapping. His body was gibbeted — left to hang in an iron cage over the Thames at Tilbury Point — as a warning to future would-be pirates for twenty years. Some sources give the location where his body was exhibited as Tilbury Ness, but this may be an alternative name for the same place. There is some uncertainty as to whether his body was displayed at what is now called Coalhouse Point or at a site a few hundred yards up stream, close to the present Tilbury Docks.

=== 1953 Floods ===
On 31 January 1953, the low-lying areas of Thurrock were inundated by the North Sea flood of 1953. The Van den Berghs and Jurgens margarine factory, which manufactured Stork margarine, was forced to stop production for many months. Since the output of this factory constituted one third of the country's ration allocation, this led to a severe strain on the supply of margarine in the UK. Most schools in Thurrock were closed, either as a direct result of the flooding or in order to use them to help the relief effort. More than 1300 people in Tilbury and other low-lying areas were evacuated to schools on the higher ground. Chadwell St Mary Primary school was used as the main welfare centre for the homeless. By 15 February, most schools had returned to normal. The last to resume were the Landsdowne school in Tilbury and the newly opened Woodside Primary School – then called Tyrell Heath School. On Friday 13 February, the flooded areas were visited by the young Queen Elizabeth II Despite severe loss of life in nearby Canvey Island, only one person in Thurrock died as a result of the floods.

=== Heritage plaques ===
In 2002, a partnership between Thurrock Council, Thurrock Heritage Forum and the Thurrock Local History Society began an initiative to place heritage plaques marking the famous people, events and organisations associated with Thurrock. By September 2021 plaques included:

- Joseph Conrad
- Alice Mangold Diehl (Musician and Novelist, born in Aveley)
- Dracula's connection to Purfleet
- The arrival of the Empire Windrush at Tilbury on 21 June 1948
- The training ship Exmouth
- The Kynoch factory in the Corringham marshes
- The shooting down of Zeppelin L15 at Purfleet in 1916
- Philip Vincent
- Alfred Russel Wallace and his house at the Dell
- Arthur Young
- The establishment of the town of Tilbury in 1912
- John Newton's connection with Aveley and Purfleet
- Benjamin Franklin's connection with the design of a lightning conductor for the Purfleet gunpowder magazine
- Henry de Grey, who gave his name to Grays
- Kate Luard, the much decorated Boer War and First World War nurse
- William Palmer who founded a charity school that became Palmer's College

=== Administrative history ===
The borough has its origins in the Orsett Poor Law Union, which had been created in 1835 covering a group of 18 parishes in southern Essex. Poor Law Unions subsequently formed the basis for later local government structures, with the Orsett Rural Sanitary District created in 1872 covering the same area. The parish of Grays Thurrock was made its own urban sanitary district in 1886.

Urban and rural sanitary districts were converted into urban districts and rural districts in 1894. Two further urban districts were later created from parts of the Orsett Rural District: the Tilbury Urban District in 1912 covering the parish of Chadwell St Mary, and the Purfleet Urban District in 1929 covering the three parishes of Aveley, South Ockendon and West Thurrock.

After 1929 the area therefore comprised four district-level authorities: one rural district, containing 13 civil parishes, and three urban districts: (Note: Whilst the urban districts still contained civil parishes, as urban parishes they had no administrative functions.)

- Grays Thurrock Urban District
- Purfleet Urban District
- Tilbury Urban District
- Orsett Rural District, with its parishes being:
  - Bulphan
  - Corringham
  - East Tilbury
  - Fobbing
  - Horndon on the Hill
  - Langdon Hills
  - Little Thurrock
  - Mucking
  - North Ockendon
  - Orsett
  - Stanford-le-Hope
  - Stifford
  - West Tilbury

In 1936 the four districts were all abolished to create the Thurrock Urban District (subject to some minor boundary changes with surrounding areas, notably at North Ockendon). All the civil parishes within the area were merged at the same time to become a single parish called Thurrock.

The present-day borough of Thurrock was created in on 1 April 1974 under the Local Government Act 1972, covering almost the same area as the former Thurrock Urban District, which was abolished, with just a minor change on the border with Basildon to place the whole designated area for Basildon new town in that district. The civil parish of Thurrock was also abolished as part of the reforms and the area became an unparished area. The reformed Thurrock district was given borough status at the same time, allowing the chair of the council to take the title of mayor.

Until 1998 Thurrock was a lower-tier district authority, with Essex County Council providing county-level services. Thurrock was made a unitary authority on 1 April 1998, taking over the county-level services. Thurrock remains part of the ceremonial county of Essex for the purposes of lieutenancy.

In March 2026, the government announced that it would abolish the district in 2028 as part of local government reform across Essex. These proposals were withdrawn in September 2026.

== Governance ==
There is only one tier of local government in Thurrock, being the unitary authority of Thurrock Council. There are no civil parishes in the borough, with the whole borough being an unparished area. The local authority is Thurrock Council. Elections are held in three years out of every four.

=== Wider politics ===
Thurrock is covered by two parliamentary constituencies. Thurrock includes most of the borough while South Basildon and East Thurrock includes some wards in the east of the borough.

== Geography ==
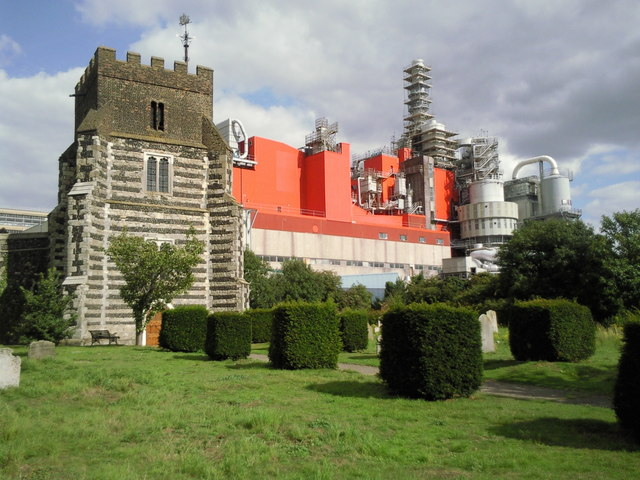
Old and new: St Clement's Church, West Thurrock with the Procter & Gamble chemical plant on the banks of the Thames behind it.

Thurrock has a population of 175,500 people living in 90,500 homes. The Metropolitan Green Belt covers 70% of the borough. There are 494 acres (200 ha) of land available for industrial use. There are seven conservation areas, 19 scheduled monuments, including the dovecote at High House Purfleet, and 239 listed buildings.

The borough contains ten Sites of Special Scientific Interest:

- Globe Pit, Grays
- Grays Chalk Pit
- Lion Pit, Grays
- Purfleet Chalk Pits
- West Thurrock Lagoon and Marshes
- Inner Thames Marshes
- Vange and Fobbing Marshes
- Basildon Meadows
- Mucking Flats and Marshes
- Hangman's Wood and Deneholes

Despite much of the borough being protected Green Belt land, Thurrock provides localised opportunities for further industrial and commercial development. The borough forms part of the Thames Gateway regeneration area, a corridor of opportunity that has been identified by central government as the area with greatest development and commercial potential in the country. Thurrock Development Corporation took over much of the borough's planning functions from its creation in 2005 until its demise in March 2011.

Much of the population and commercial activity is centred along the riverfront. This includes many large and important industrial sites, including two large oil refineries, manufacturing industries, a container port, cruise liner terminal, distribution warehousing and one of Britain's largest refuse disposal sites at the appropriately named settlement of Mucking. Thurrock is also home to the Lakeside Shopping Centre.

=== Climate ===
Climate in this area has mild differences between highs and lows, and there is adequate rainfall year-round. The Köppen Climate Classification subtype for this climate is "Cfb" (Marine West Coast Climate/Oceanic climate).

Climate data for Thurrock
Month	Jan	Feb	Mar	Apr	May	Jun	Jul	Aug	Sep	Oct	Nov	Dec	Year
Mean daily maximum °C (°F)	8 (46)	8 (46)	11 (52)	12 (54)	16 (61)	18 (64)	21 (70)	22 (72)	18 (64)	14 (57)	10 (50)	8 (46)	14 (57)
Mean daily minimum °C (°F)	5 (41)	4 (39)	6 (43)	6 (43)	10 (50)	12 (54)	15 (59)	15 (59)	12 (54)	10 (50)	6 (43)	5 (41)	9 (48)
Average precipitation days	13	11	10	11	8	10	9	5	11	10	9	10	117
Source: Weatherbase

== Demography ==
Historical population
Year	Pop.	±%
1911	2,500	—
1951	82,100	+3184.0%
1961	114,300	+39.2%
1971	125,000	+9.4%
1981	127,400	+1.9%
1985	124,600	−2.2%
1991	128,700	+3.3%
1995	133,400	+3.7%
2001	143,300	+7.4%
2005	148,900	+3.9%
2007	152,200	+2.2%
2011	158,300	+4.0%
All totals rounded to nearest hundred Source: Populstat & NOMIS

At the census of 2011, there were 157,705 people, 62,353 households and 45,985 families residing in the borough. The population density was 9.7 people per hectare. There were 63,869 housing units. The racial makeup of the borough was 86% White, 3.8% Asian, 7.8% Black, 2% Mixed Race, 0.6% other.

There were 62,353 households, out of which 30.5% had children under the age of 18 living with them, 72.7% were married couples living together, 52.5% of all households were made up of individuals, 10.2% had someone living alone who was 65 years of age or older.

The median age in the borough was 42. 25.5% of residents were under the age of 18; 7.3% of residents were between the ages of 19 and 24; 30.3% were from 25 to 44; 24.2% were from 45 to 64; and 38.2% were 65 years of age or older. The gender makeup of the city was 49.3% male and 50.6% female.

== Economy ==
This is a chart of trend of regional gross value added of Thurrock at current basic prices published (pp. 240–253) by the Office for National Statistics with figures in millions of British Pounds Sterling.

Year	Regional gross value added	Agriculture	Industry	Services
1995	1,406	8	657	741
2000	1,737	4	677	1,056
2003	1,995	5	664	1,327

== Culture and film ==
Thurrock has been the scene of several major films. St Clement's Church and street scenes at West Thurrock were used in the making of the film Four Weddings and a Funeral. Thurrock can also be seen in 28 Days Later. Scenes from the films Alfie (2004), and Indiana Jones and the Last Crusade were shot at Tilbury docks. The opening scenes from Batman Begins (2005) were shot at Coalhouse Fort in East Tilbury. Some filming also took place for the film Essex Boys in and around the Bata estate at East Tilbury. The State Cinema, where Eddie met Roger in the classic Who Framed Roger Rabbit, can be found in Grays.

=== Art Deco architecture in Thurrock ===
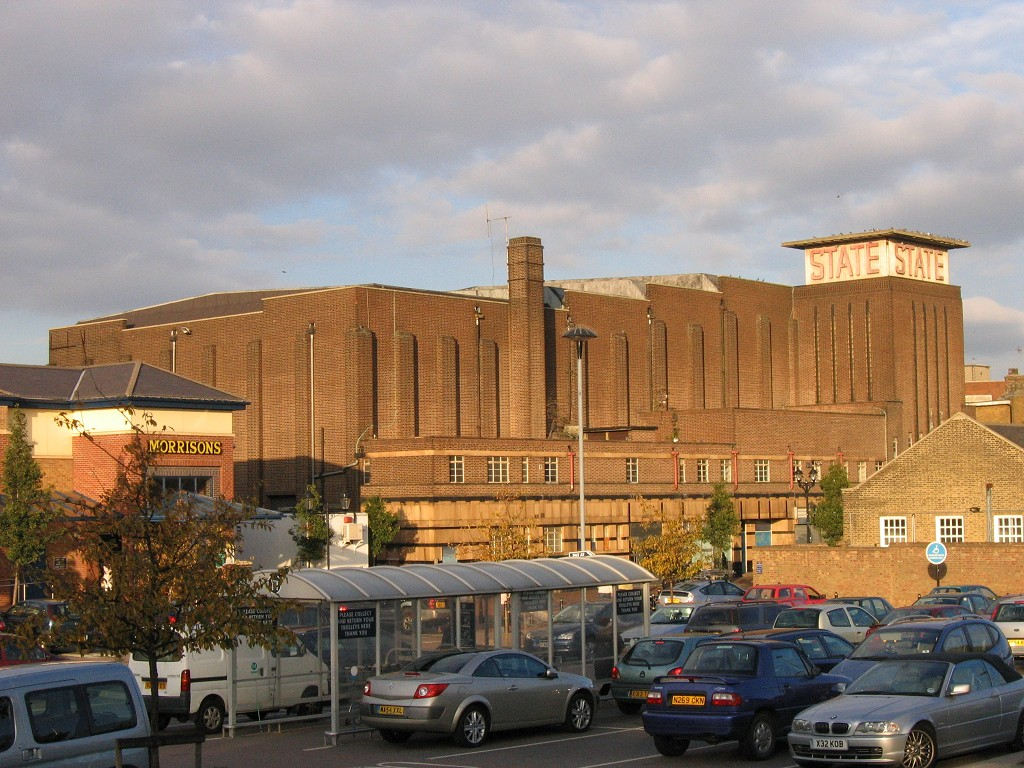
The State Cinema in 2007

There are a number of examples of Art Deco architecture in Thurrock. The baggage hall at Tilbury was opened in 1930. It has an art deco interior, designed by Sir Edwin Cooper and is a grade II listed building. The State cinema is also a listed building and dates from 1938. It is one of the few surviving examples of 1930s cinema architecture. It has the original cinema organ which can still be played. However, in the early 21st century the building became disused and faced dereliction. In September 2015 it was announced that J D Wetherspoon had bought the property for conversion to a public house.( Building of the Bata Shoes estate in East Tilbury began in 1933, and this is now a conservation area. JD Wetherspoon have since put the State Cinema building up for sale after announcing they would no longer be converting it to a public house.

Chadwell St Mary has one of the few examples of a "Sunspan" house designed by the architect Wells Coates. Although built in the 1950s, Woodside Primary School's architecture has been described as the slightly earlier "ocean liner" style of Art Deco. The building features a number of bricked curves and circular windows, while the wrought-iron banisters on the stairs are deliberately set to lean out at an angle.

=== Attractions ===
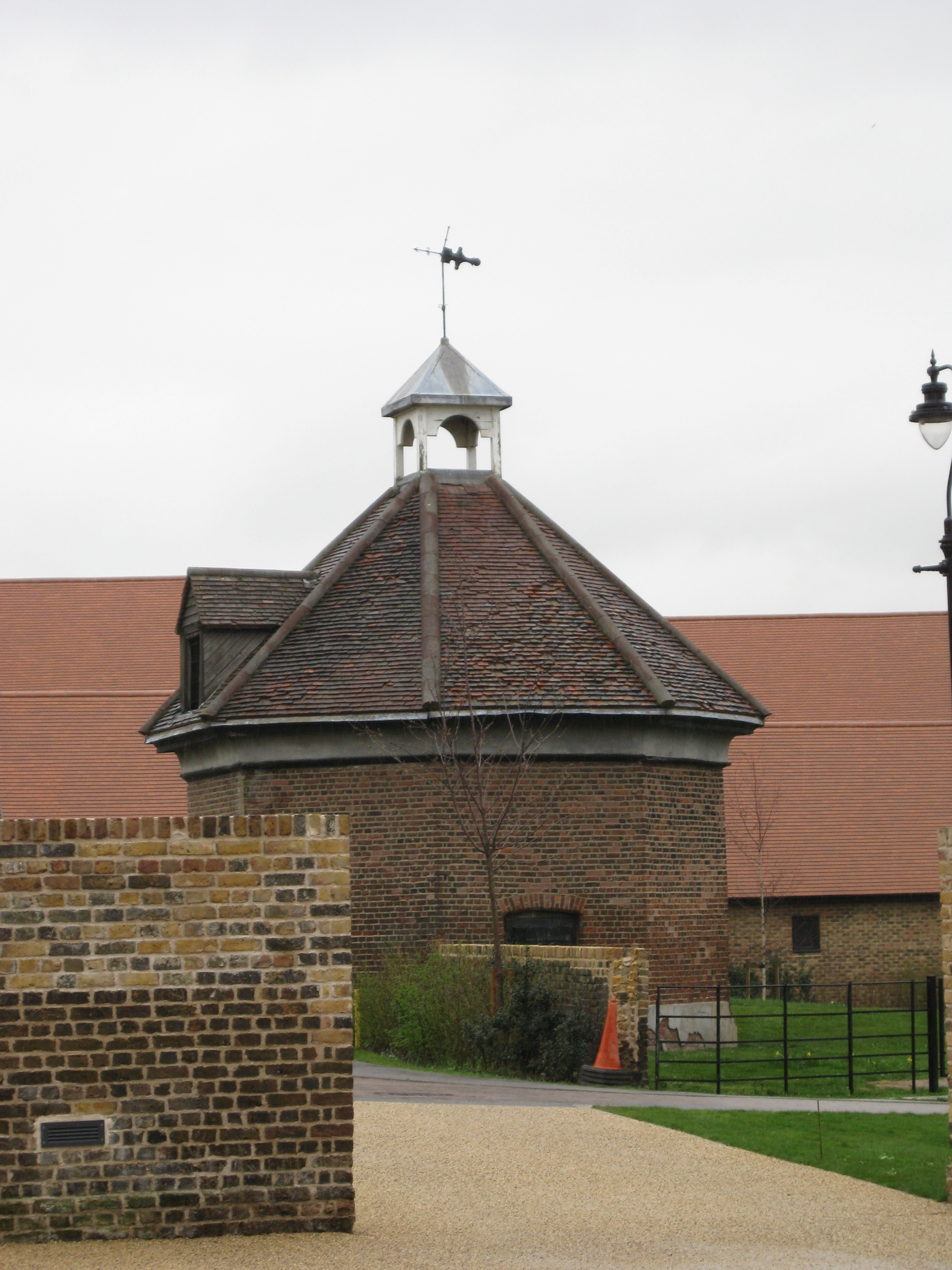
The Dovecote at High House

There is one multiplex cinema attached to the Lakeside Shopping Centre, and the Thameside Theatre in Grays. Live shows are held at the Circus Tavern in Purfleet. Open space includes Chafford Gorges Nature Park, Langdon Hills Country Park and Grove House Wood, managed by Essex Wildlife Trust. Museums and historic buildings include Coalhouse Fort at East Tilbury, Tilbury Fort in Tilbury, Purfleet Heritage and Military Centre, High House, Purfleet with its historic farm buildings, the Royal Opera House's Bob and Tamar Manoukian Production Workshop, The Backstage Centre and ACME artists' studios, Thurrock Museum and Walton Hall Farm Museum.

Next to Lakeside Shopping Centre is Arena Essex, a former motor sports complex, where speedway, banger and stock car racing took place. This site is now to be redeveloped for housing.

== Transport ==
Being on the river and close to London, Thurrock is served with good communication links. The M25 London Orbital Motorway, the railway line between Southend and London Fenchurch Street which provides direct access to Central London, the Port of Tilbury, and the nearby London City Airport make Thurrock an important international trade centre. There is a grass airstrip south of Bulphan village. A ferry for passengers on foot connects Tilbury with Gravesend on the southern bank of the River Thames.

Rail transport in the borough is provided by c2c with stations at:

- Chafford Hundred railway station
- East Tilbury railway station
- Grays railway station
- Ockendon railway station
- Purfleet railway station
- Stanford-le-Hope railway station
- Tilbury Town railway station
- West Horndon railway station (on northern boundary)

Bus services within the Thurrock urban area are mostly provided by Ensignbus.

- Arriva has a depot at West Thurrock, but all of its work is Transport for London contracts and has only one route running into Thurrock, the 370.

Other operators are First Essex, Stagecoach London and NIBS Buses.

== Education ==
Thurrock has 55 schools; 39 of them are primary schools, 13 are secondary, two are special and one is alternative. All but one have free school or academy status, with Grays Convent High School instead having voluntary aided status. Five schools, including Grays Convent High School and four primary schools, are Catholic faith schools while two primary schools are Anglican faith schools. 44 schools in Thurrock are operated by one of 13 multi-academy trusts, which include major chains such as the Harris Federation and Ormiston Trust and the country's first cooperative academy trust. Since 2007, all secondary schools in Thurrock have had specialist school status. Some schools, such as William Edwards School and Orsett Heath Academy, utilise their right as specialist schools to select 10% of their pupils in specialist subject aptitude every year.

Thurrock has no grammar schools, although Thurrock Council has tried to introduce them. Historically Thurrock had three grammar schools, Grays Thurrock School, Palmer's School for Boys and Palmer's School for Girls. In 1931, the Palmer's schools became public schools with boarding, reverting back to grammar school status in 1944 under voluntary control. Grays Convent High School was an independent day school from its formation until 1969. There were also two selective secondary technical schools, Grays County Technical High School which is now an academy status comprehensive and Aveley County Technical High School, which merged with the Palmer's schools in 1971 to form Palmer's College.

Palmer's College, now one half of USP College, is Thurrock's local sixth form college for generalised further education, whilst the Thurrock Campus of South Essex College is the local sixth form college for vocational education. Palmer's also offers courses at higher education. Other institutions of further education in Thurrock include the Thurrock Adult Community College, Osborne Sixth Form and Ortu Sixth Form Centre Stanford & Corringham.

=== Partnerships ===
The Tilbury and Chadwell St Mary Excellence Cluster brought together Chadwell St Mary Primary School, ORTU Corringham Primary School, Grays Convent High School, Hassenbrook Academy, Herringham Primary School, Landsdowne Primary School, Manor Infant School, Manor Junior School, St Mary's RC Primary School, Woodside Primary School and The Gateway Academy. Senior members of the schools' councils also sat on the cluster's student council before its dissolution.

ORTU Gable Hall School has had a long partnership with Pro Arte Alphen Park School in Pretoria, Gauteng, South Africa for almost 10 years – the two schools have held exchange programmes with each other and the students sampling life in each other's respective countries.

Woodside Primary is linked with a school in Nepal, through the charity Gorkha Learning for Life, which was founded by a member of school staff.

== Media ==
=== Television ===
Thurrock is served by BBC London and ITV London with television signals are received from Crystal Palace TV transmitter, BBC South East and ITV Meridian can also be received from Bluebell Hill TV transmitter.

=== Radio ===
Radio stations that broadcast to the area are:

- BBC Essex
- Heart East
- Radio Essex
- Time 107.5
- Gateway 97.8, a community based station

=== Newspapers ===
The area is served by these local newspapers:

- The Thurrock Gazette
- The Evening Echo

== Sport and leisure ==
Thurrock has several Non-League football clubs in the area:

- Tilbury F.C. the oldest surviving football club in Thurrock having been formed in 1889. They have played at Chadfields since 1947.
- Thurrock F.C. which played at Ship Lane and was dissolved in 2018
- Aveley F.C. which plays at Parkside
- Grays Athletic F.C. which played in at the New Recreation Ground in central Grays until 2010, but now plays at Parkside
- East Thurrock United F.C. which plays at Rookery Hill

Thurrock Yacht Club is based in the centre of Grays on the Thames foreshore. It offers a range of competitive and recreational boating opportunities.

== List of places in the borough ==
- Aveley
- Bulphan
- Chadwell St Mary
- Chafford Hundred
- Corringham
- Coryton Refinery
- East Tilbury
- Fobbing
- Grays
- Horndon-on-the-Hill
- Linford
- Little Thurrock
- Mucking
- Orsett
- Purfleet-on-Thames
- Shell Haven
- South Ockendon
- Stanford-le-Hope
- Stifford
- Thames Haven
- Thurrock Village
- Tilbury
- West Thurrock

=== Historic buildings ===
- Coalhouse Fort
- St Clement's Church
- The State Cinema
- Tilbury Fort
- The Woolmarket, Horndon
- Palmer's College
- Orsett Hall
- St Peter & St Paul’s Church, Grays

== Freedom of the Borough ==
The following people and military units have received the Freedom of the Borough of Thurrock.

=== Individuals ===
- Dorothy Coker: 26 September 2001.
- Reverend John Guest: 30 September 2021.
- Canon Brian O’Shea: 30 September 2021.
- Father Paul Dynan: 30 September 2021.
- The Reverend Canon Darren Barlow: 31 January 2024.
- Fatima Whitbread: 21 May 2025.
- Margaret Whitbread: 21 May 2025.
- James "Jim" Gooding: 21 May 2025.

=== Military Units ===
- 215 (Essex) Squadron, RLC: 28 June 1986.
- The Royal Anglian Regiment: 18 July 1990.
- The Port of Tilbury Police: 25 September 2002.
- The Burma Star Association (Thurrock Branch): 26 November 2008.

== Twin towns ==
The borough of Thurrock is twinned with the following places:

- Mönchengladbach – city in Germany
- Płock – city in Poland
