= Osborne Sixth Form =

Location
- Shenfield Common, Seven Arches Road; Brentwood, Essex, CM14 4JF; England; 51.6161°N 0.3082°E

Information
- Motto: Keep Trust, Opportunity and Excellence for All
- Specialists: Science, Maths and Computing
- Director: Mr. R. Davies (BCHS); Ms. C. Shaughnessy (St Clere's)
- Deputy Director: Mr. T. Fisher (BCHS)
- Staff: approx. 90
- Gender: Coeducational
- Age: 16 to 19
- Enrolment: approx. 200
- Website: https://osbornesixthform.com

The Osborne Sixth Form is a post-16 education sixth form centre with two campuses in Brentwood, Essex and Stanford-Le-Hope, Thurrock. The centre currently educates more than 300 students from North East London and South West Essex. It is run by the Osborne Co-operative Academy Trust.

The two campuses are extensions of Brentwood County High School and St Clere's School respectively and the sixth form serves internal students from these schools. Some external candidates between the ages of 16-19 are also admitted provided they meet the entry requirements set by the centre. Most students will follow A-level courses with some students working towards other Level 3 qualifications such as the BTEC.

== Overview ==
On the Brentwood County High School site, there is a dedicated sixth form common room, study area and pastoral support as well as priority access to the library resource centre.

== Notable alumni ==
=== Brentwood County High School ===
- William Lloyd, Conservative Party councillor and BCHS head boy
