= West Thurrock =

Area of Thurrock, Essex, England

Coordinates: 51.4836°N 0.2820°E

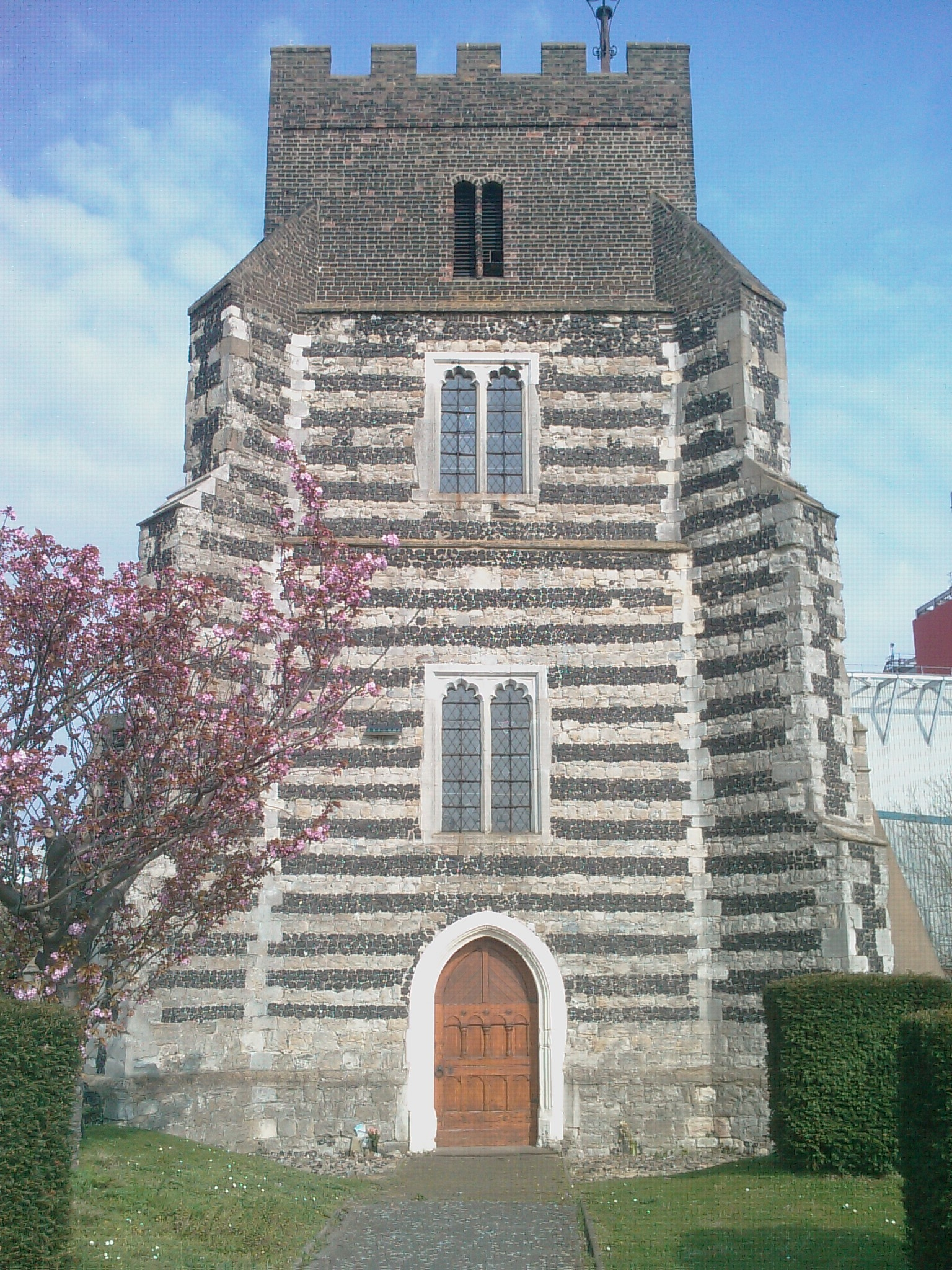
- St Clements Church

- Location within Essex
- Population: 7,795 (2001 Census)
- OS grid reference: TQ585785
- Unitary authority: Thurrock
- Ceremonial county: Essex
- Region: East
- Country: England
- Sovereign state: United Kingdom
- Post town: GRAYS
- Postcode district: RM20
- Dialling code: 01708
- Police: Essex
- Fire: Essex
- Ambulance: East of England
- UK Parliament: Thurrock

West Thurrock is an area the borough of Thurrock in Essex, England. It lies 18 miles (29 km) east of Charing Cross, London. West Thurrock was historically a parish; the parish was abolished for civil purposes in 1936 when West Thurrock became part of Thurrock.

== History ==
West Thurrock was an ancient parish in the Hundred of Chafford in Essex. When elected parish and district councils were established under the Local Government Act 1894, West Thurrock was given a parish council and included in the Orsett Rural District. In 1929, West Thurrock and the neighbouring parishes of Aveley and South Ockendon were removed from Orsett Rural District to become the short-lived Purfleet Urban District. As part of that reform, West Thurrock was reclassified as an urban parish and so lost its parish council; the lowest elected tier of local government was Purfleet Urban District Council. The Purfleet Urban District was abolished just seven years later in 1936, becoming part of Thurrock Urban District. The civil parish of West Thurrock was abolished as part of the 1936 reforms, becoming part of a single parish of Thurrock covering the same area as the urban district. At the 1931 census (the last before the abolition of the civil parish), West Thurrock had a population of 5,153.

== Location ==
West Thurrock is part of the unitary authority of Thurrock located on the north bank of the River Thames about 17 miles (27 km) from Charing Cross, London.

Nearest places:

- Aveley
- Chafford Hundred
- Grays
- South Ockendon

Nearest stations:

- Chafford Hundred railway station
- Grays railway station
- Purfleet railway station

== Industry ==
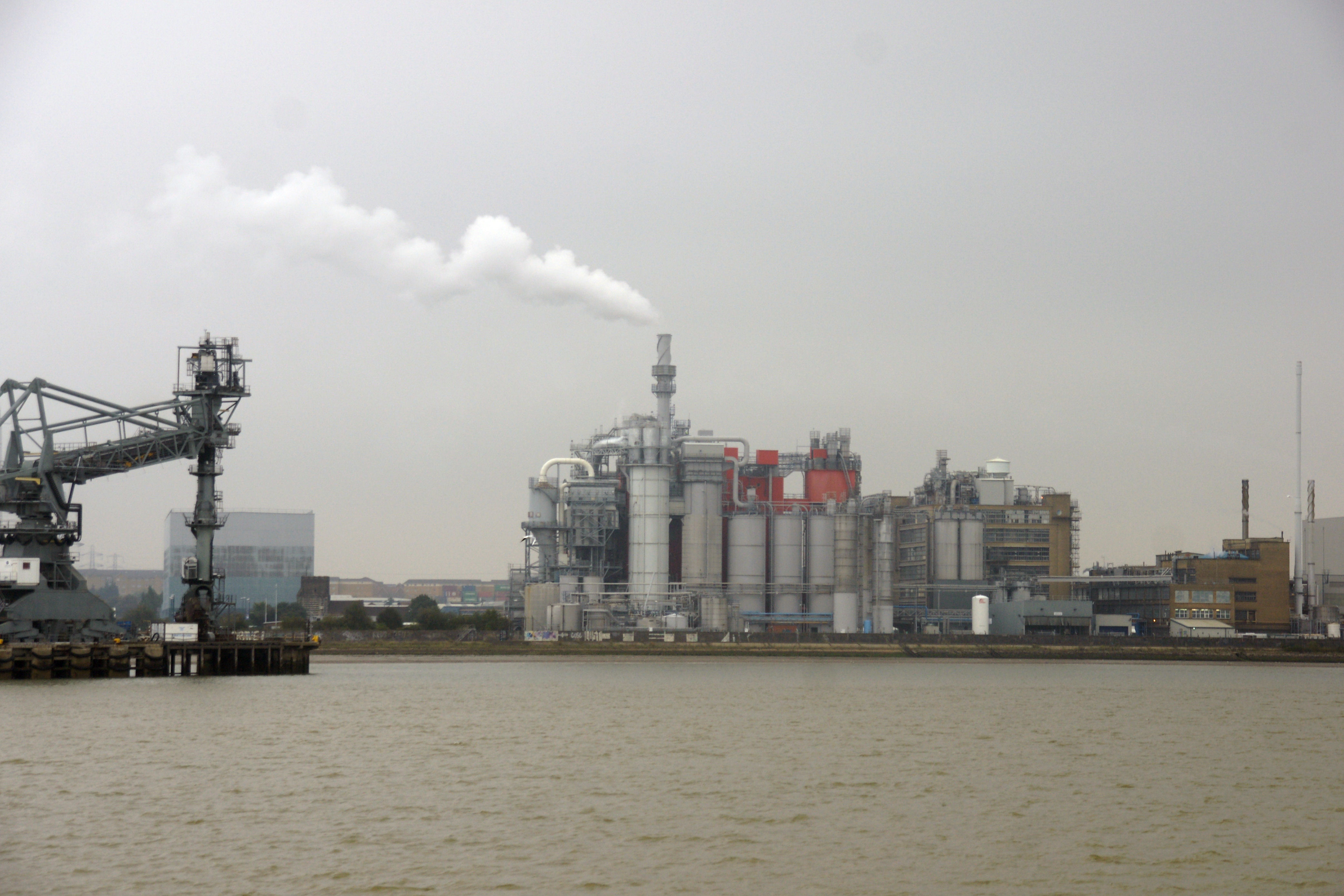
Procter & Gamble works

Industry along the Thames includes a Unilever chilled distribution centre for all its chilled food products including Flora, Bertolli, I Can't Believe It's Not Butter, Stork, Peperami and AdeZ. A Procter & Gamble (originally Hedley's) plant manufactures detergents and soaps.

The large coal-burning West Thurrock Power Station closed in 1993, and was replaced by a plant making industrial chemicals, particularly the raw materials for detergent manufacture. The 190-metre-tall (620 ft) electricity pylons of 400 kV Thames Crossing, the tallest electricity pylons in the UK, remain. Just upstream of the pylons the tunnel of High Speed 1 passes under the Thames.

West Thurrock was formerly the site of a large chalk quarrying and cement making industry. Individual companies included Brooks (which became part of APC), Gibbs & Co., Wouldham Cement and Tunnel Cement (now part of Hanson Cement). Today, this industry is represented only by the works of Lafarge below the Queen Elizabeth II Bridge. A new plant for the production of aluminous cement was completed in 2003.

== Buildings ==
Belmont Castle seen from the River Thames circa 1830

West Thurrock is the location of the Lakeside Shopping Centre on the site of a chalk quarry owned by Tunnel Cement.

St Clement's Church, the historic parish church, was used for the funeral in the film Four Weddings and a Funeral. A modern replacement church, also dedicated to St Clement, now stands on London Road. The old church is now managed by Procter & Gamble, who own the adjoining factory, but occasional services are still held there.

Belmont Castle, England, a neo-Gothic mansion, was built in West Thurrock in 1795 but was demolished in 1943 to make way for a chalk quarry.

== Origin of the name ==
Thurrock is a Saxon name meaning "the bottom of a ship". West Thurrock is one of three "Thurrocks", the others being Little Thurrock and Grays Thurrock.
