= Horndon-on-the-Hill =

Village in Essex, England

Coordinates: 51.524°N 0.403°E

Horndon on the Hill
- Village
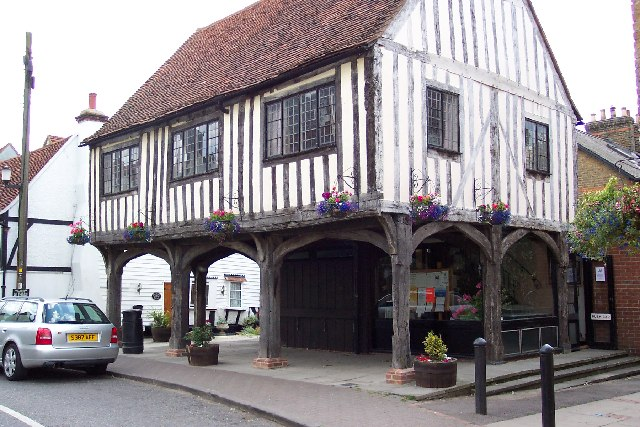
- The Horndon Woolmarket

- Location within Essex
- Area: 0.672 km^{2} (0.259 sq mi)
- Population: 1,521 (Built up area, 2021)
  - Density: 2,263/km^{2} (5,860/sq mi)
- OS grid reference: TQ665835
- Unitary authority: Thurrock
- Ceremonial county: Essex
- Region: East
- Country: England
- Sovereign state: United Kingdom
- Post town: STANFORD-LE-HOPE
- Postcode district: SS17
- Dialling code: 01375
- Police: Essex
- Fire: Essex
- Ambulance: East of England
- UK Parliament: Thurrock

Horndon-on-the-Hill is a village in the borough of Thurrock, in Essex, England. It is located close to the A13, around 1 mile (1.6 km) north-west of Stanford-le-Hope, its post town, and around 2 miles (3 km) north-east of Orsett. At the 2021 census the built up area had a population of 1,521.

The village has two churches, the Anglican Church of St Peter and St Paul, which dates from the 13th century and is Grade I listed and a Methodist Church. It also has a primary school, a village halla recreational park and two public houses, The Swan and The Bell.

Horndon-on-the-Hill was an ancient parish. It was abolished as a civil parish in 1936 on the creation of Thurrock Urban District, which in turn became the modern borough of Thurrock in 1974. The parish has also been merged for ecclesiastical purposes with the neighbouring parishes of Bulphan and Orsett.

== Toponymy ==
The name Horndon means "horn-shaped hill".

The name is hyphenated by some official bodies but not others. In official postal addresses, the Royal Mail hyphenates the name as Horndon-on-the-Hill. On Ordnance Survey maps, the name is shown without hyphens as Horndon on the Hill. The Office for National Statistics also omits the hyphens from the name of the built up area.

== History ==
Horndon-on-the-Hill was likely founded as a fortified settlement in the late 10th-century or early 11th-century, in response to Viking aggression in the Thames Estuary. It was briefly the site of Horndon mint, based on the survival of a single Anglo-Saxon penny from the village.

Horndon-on-the-Hill appears in the Domesday Book of 1086 as Hornindune.

In the late 15th century, the lord of the manors of Arden Hall and Horndon House was Sir Edmund Shaa. Shaa was a supporter of Richard III and was knighted by him. These manors remained in the Shaa family for several generations before passing to the Pooley family.

A woolmarket was established in the village in the early 16th century; the building later became a shelter for the poor people of the area.

On the south wall of St Peter and St Paul's church is a memorial to Thomas Higbed, who was burned at the stake in Horndon in 1555 and is included in Foxe's Book of Martyrs.

Horndon on the Hill is one of the seven conservation areas of Thurrock and was the first of the seven to be designated, in September 1969.

Since the 13th century, Horndon on the Hill has hosted the annual "Feast and Fayre" on the last weekend in June.

Prominent residents have included Sir John Tusa, journalist and broadcaster and former President of Wolfson College, Cambridge.

Philip Conrad Vincent, founder & Designer of Vincent Motorcycles Great Britain, lived in Horndon on the-Hill, and his final resting place is in the Parish cemetery of St Peter and St Paul in the centre of the village.

=== Administrative history ===
Horndon-on-the-Hill was an ancient parish in the Barstable Hundred of Essex. When elected parish and district councils were established in 1894, Horndon-on-the-Hill was included in the Orsett Rural District. The civil parish and the rural district were both abolished in 1936 when the area became part of the new Thurrock Urban District. At the 1931 census (the last before the abolition of the civil parish), Horndon-on-the-Hill had a population of 1,052.

Thurrock Urban District was reformed to become a non-metropolitan district with borough status called Thurrock in 1974. Thurrock Borough Council became a unitary authority in 1998, taking over county-level services in the borough which until then had been provided by Essex County Council. Thurrock remains part of the ceremonial county of Essex for the purposes of lieutenancy.

The parish of Horndon-on-the-Hill has also been abolished for ecclesiastical purposes, merging with Bulphan and Orsett to form a Church of England ecclesiastical parish called "Horndon, Orsett and Bulphan".
