= Grove House Wood =

Nature reserve in Stanford-le-Hope, Essex, England

Coordinates: 51.5106°N 0.42763°E

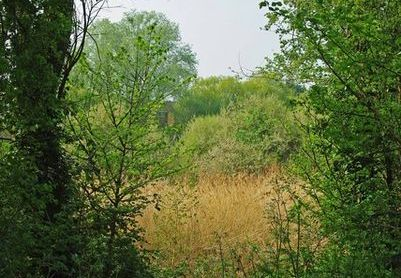
- Interactive map of Grove House Wood
- Type: Local Nature Reserve
- Location: Stanford-le-Hope, Essex
- OS grid: TQ 685 818
- Area: 2.2 hectares (5.4 acres)
- Manager: Not known

Grove House Wood is a 2.2 hectare Local Nature Reserve in Stanford-le-Hope in Essex. According to Natural England, it is owned by Thurrock Council and managed by Essex Wildlife Trust but it is not listed on the web site of either body.

The site has woodland with dead elms which provide nesting sites for woodpeckers. Other habitats are a pond, a brook and reedbeds.

There is access from Fairview Avenue.
