= 2026 Thurrock Council election =

2025 English local government election

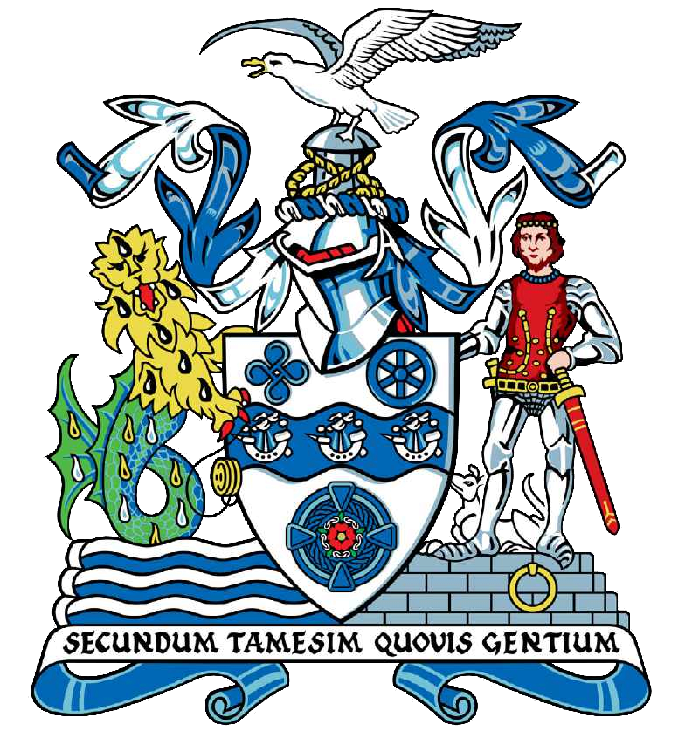
- 7 May 2026

All 49 seats to Thurrock Council 25 seats needed for a majority
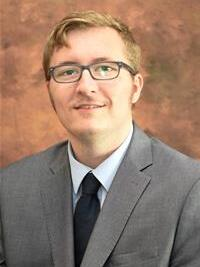

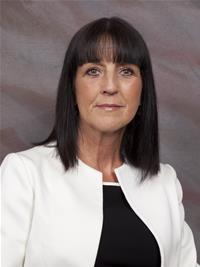

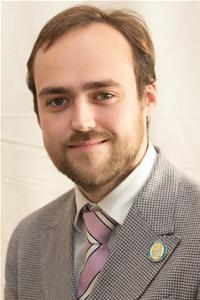

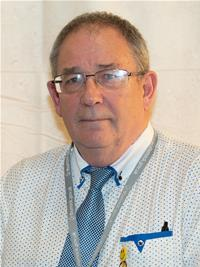
	First party	Second party
Leader	Alex Anderson	Lynn Worrall
Party	Reform	Labour
Leader's seat	Stanford-le-Hope South	Grays Town (lost seat)
Last election	Did not stand	27 seats, 52.1%
Seats before	4	26
Seats won	45	2
Seat change	▲41	▼24
Popular vote	55,058	24,125
Percentage	51.5%	22.6%
Swing	(New)	▼28.8%
	Third party	Fourth party
Leader	George Coxshall	Neil Speight (Note: Leader and spokesman of the Non-Political Alliance of Independent Councillors, which represents the majority of independent councillors on the council.)
Party	Conservative	Independent
Leader's seat	Belhus (stood down)	Stanford-le-Hope South (lost seat)
Last election	13 seats, 29.4%	9 seats, 15.7% (Note: Including five members of the Non-Political Alliance of Independent Councillors and four unaffiliated independents.)
Seats before	11	8 (Note: Including seven members of the Non-Political Alliance of Independent Councillors and one unaffiliated independent.)
Seats won	2	0
Seat change	▼9	▼8
Popular vote	15,055	3,473
Percentage	14.1%	3.3%
Swing	▼14.8%	▼12.2%
- Winner of each seat at the 2026 Thurrock Council election
Leader before election
Lynn Worrall
Labour
Leader after election
Richard Bingley
Reform

The 2026 Thurrock Council election took place on 7 May 2026 to elect members to Thurrock Council in Essex, England. 49 seats were elected, on the same day as the UK's 2026 local elections.

Originally scheduled for 2025, the election was postponed by a year to 2026 after the government intervened in the council after it declared bankruptcy, with a new electoral system installed where all 49 seats to the council would be up for a term of four years. In February 2025, elections in the borough were brought back to 2026, ahead of local government reorganisation and devolution. The 2026 election was due to be cancelled ahead of local government reorganisation, but in February it was reinstated.

Prior to the election, the council was under Labour majority control. The election saw Reform UK win 45 of the 49 seats on the council. The Labour leader of the council prior to the election, Lynn Worrall, lost her seat. After the election, Reform chose as its new leader Richard Bingley, who had formerly been a Conservative leader of Plymouth City Council. He was formally appointed as leader of Thurrock Council at the subsequent annual council meeting on 27 May 2026.

Thurrock Council is soon to be abolished under the plans of the English Devolution and Community Empowerment Bill and will be merged with Basildon Council to form a new South West Essex Unitary Authority.

== Background ==
The 2026 election will be held under new ward boundaries. The council is switching to all-out elections, having previously elected by thirds, as a result of a period of government intervention in the running of the council's finances.

At the last election in 2024, the Labour Party led by John Kent won an overall majority with 27 seats. The Conservatives led by Andrew Jefferies won a total of 13 seats, leaving the council administration and entering opposition. Independent politicians won 9 seats, five of whom were aligned with the Non-Political Alliance of Independent Councillors (NPAIC) led by Neil Speight. By July 2024, eight of the nine independents had joined the alliance. Alex Anderson, the unaffiliated independent, joined Reform UK in September 2024, becoming Reform's first councillor in Thurrock. In October 2024, NPAIC councillor John Allen left the NPAIC to sit as an unaffiliated independent, as he was considering standing for Reform UK in the 2025 council election, leaving the NPAIC with seven independents.

In January 2025, Ockendon councillor Ryan Polston of the Labour Party resigned his seat ahead of a career move. He was followed in March by fellow ward councillor Andrew Jefferies, the leader of the Conservative group, who resigned for personal reasons. Reform UK won both seats at the subsequent by-election in May 2025. Ahead of the by-election, Labour leader John Kent resigned from the leadership to make way for his deputy Lynn Worrall ahead of devolution and local government reorganisation negotiations. Later that year, NPAIC members Gary Byrne and Ross Byrne left the group to sit as unaffiliated independents, which left the council with 26 Labour members, 12 Conservatives, five NPAIC members, three unaffiliated independents and three Reform UK members.

== Campaign ==
The Conservatives, Labour, and Reform all stood a full slate of 49 candidates in Thurrock. The Green Party, for the first time, stood at least one candidate in every ward. There were also six Independent and two Liberal Democrat candidates.

== Election result ==
2026 Thurrock Council election
Party	Candidates	Seats	Gains	Losses	Net gain/loss	Seats %	Votes %	Votes	+/−
Reform	49	45	N/A	N/A	▲41	91.8	51.5	55,058	N/A
Labour	49	2	N/A	N/A	▼24	4.1	22.6	24,125	–28.8
Conservative	49	2	N/A	N/A	▼9	4.1	14.1	15,055	–14.8
Green	24	0	N/A	N/A	Steady	0.0	8.3	8,909	+5.5
Independent	6	0	N/A	N/A	▼8	0.0	3.3	3,473	–12.2
Liberal Democrats	2	0	N/A	N/A	Steady	0.0	0.4	375	N/A

== Ward results ==
=== Aveley ===
Aveley (3 seats)
Party	Candidate	Votes	%
Reform	Chris Irvine	1,189	53.3
Reform	George Monk	1,154	51.7
Reform	Aiden Prince	1,110	49.8
Labour	Cathy Sisterson	737	33.0
Labour	Srikanth Panjala	634	28.4
Labour	Mo Hoque	588	26.4
Green	Ollie Beck	359	16.1
Conservative	Colin Adams	318	14.3
Conservative	Maureen Pearce	315	14.1
Conservative	Anthony Coyle	288	12.9
Turnout		2,476	35.6
Registered electors		6,957	
Reform win (new seat)			
Reform win (new seat)			
Reform win (new seat)			

=== Belhus ===
Belhus (3 seats)
Party	Candidate	Votes	%	±%
Reform	Linda Benson	1,338	54.3	N/A
Reform	Tom Kelly	1,287	57.1	N/A
Reform	Bogdan Enache	1,190	52.8	N/A
Labour	Benjamin Agyemang	565	25.0	–43.9
Labour	Fahima Danishmal	495	21.9	–47.0
Labour	Lalitha Panjala	437	19.4	–49.5
Independent	Sophie Corcoran	396	17.6	N/A
Green	Geraldine Jane Roche	390	17.3	N/A
Conservative	Rosalyn Jenkins	269	11.9	–19.2
Conservative	Oluwatoyin Imole-Sontan	197	8.7	–22.4
Conservative	Shamim Miah	153	6.8	–24.3
Turnout		2,466	32.0	+10.2
Registered electors		7,693		
Reform gain from Labour				
Reform gain from Conservative				
Reform gain from Labour				

=== Chadwell St Mary ===
Chadwell St Mary (3 seats)
Party	Candidate	Votes	%	±%
Reform	Jack Fuller	1,358	58.9	N/A
Reform	Matt Lake	1,348	58.4	N/A
Reform	James Mackintosh	1,298	56.3	N/A
Labour	Daniel Chukwu*	622	27.0	–45.0
Labour	Jo Potter	588	25.5	–46.5
Labour	Ngozi Alike*	579	25.1	–46.9
Green	Yogesh Taylor	337	14.6	N/A
Conservative	Melissa Perry	282	12.2	–15.8
Conservative	Abbie Akinbohun	258	11.2	–16.8
Conservative	Elizabeth Onibokun	250	10.8	–17.2
Turnout		2,530	33.7	+11.7
Registered electors		7,511		
Reform gain from Labour				
Reform gain from Labour				
Reform gain from Labour				

=== Chafford Hundred East ===
Chafford Hundred East (2 seats)
Party	Candidate	Votes	%
Reform	Peggy Davies	739	39.7
Reform	Stephen Davies	726	39.0
Labour	Vikki Hartstean*	631	33.9
Labour	Julie Eke-Lawrence	538	28.9
Conservative	Adam Carter	410	22.0
Conservative	Peter Eates	359	19.3
Green	Jessica Bartlett-Hyde	318	17.1
Turnout		2,049	37.5
Registered electors		5,422	
Reform win (new seat)			
Reform win (new seat)			

=== Chafford Hundred West ===
Chafford Hundred West (2)
Party	Candidate	Votes	%
Labour	Susan Shinnick*	536	36.2
Reform	Oscar Ellis	516	34.9
Reform	Jason Mitchell	480	32.5
Labour	Gary Watson*	426	28.8
Conservative	Tunde Ojetola	377	25.5
Green	Caitlin Fallows	344	23.3
Conservative	Wilmer Luna	279	18.9
Turnout		1,668	32.4
Registered electors		5,151	
Labour win (new seat)			
Reform win (new seat)			

=== Corringham & Fobbing ===
Corringham & Fobbing (3 seats)
Party	Candidate	Votes	%	±%
Reform	Holly Bennett	2,226	69.2	N/A
Reform	Ian Croom	2,174	67.6	N/A
Reform	Sara Poyntz	2,036	63.3	N/A
Labour	John Cecil*	624	19.4	–4.8
Labour	Anita Nuss	526	16.4	–7.8
Conservative	Shane Ralph	517	16.1	–13.0
Labour	Kamlesh Kumar	442	13.7	–10.5
Conservative	Sam Flatt	418	13.0	–16.1
Green	Gbenga Olajugbagbe	374	11.6	N/A
Conservative	Jimmy Thandi	307	9.5	–19.6
Turnout		3,532	44.9	+11.6
Registered electors		7,864		
Reform gain from Conservative				
Reform gain from Independent				
Reform win (new seat)				

=== East Tilbury, Linford & West Tilbury ===
East Tilbury, Linford & West Tilbury (2 seats)
Party	Candidate	Votes	%
Reform	Michelle Burton	1,073	63.1
Reform	Kevin Lawrence	973	57.2
Green	Sandra Elliott	297	17.5
Labour	Adam Breese	293	17.2
Labour	Alastair Craft	273	16.0
Liberal Democrats	Jon Bowler	192	11.3
Conservative	Lesley Maney	179	10.5
Conservative	Alan Reilly	123	7.2
Turnout		1,811	36.3
Registered electors		4,986	
Reform win (new seat)			
Reform win (new seat)			
Reform win (new seat)			

=== Grays Riverside ===
Grays Riverside (3 seats)
Party	Candidate	Votes	%	±%
Reform	Darren Dennis	716	36.4	N/A
Reform	Joe Soper	657	33.4	N/A
Reform	Catalin-Daniel Farcas	650	33.0	N/A
Green	Chloe Anderson	633	32.2	+16.0
Labour	Funmi Ademilua	569	28.9	–34.5
Green	Kimberley Dennis	562	28.6	+12.4
Labour	Tony Fish*	520	26.4	–37.0
Green	Paul Parfitt	516	26.2	+10.0
Labour	Mark Hurrell	482	24.5	–38.9
Conservative	Claudia Luna	238	12.1	–8.3
Conservative	Rakhi Rashmi	186	9.5	–10.9
Conservative	Adeleke Taiwo	174	8.8	–11.6
Turnout		2,112	30.7	+8.9
Registered electors		6,875		
Reform gain from Labour				
Reform gain from Labour				
Reform gain from Labour				

=== Grays Town ===
Grays Town (3 seats)
Party	Candidate	Votes	%
Reform	Milena Bingley	1,004	40.6
Reform	Michael Kevin Shakespeare	998	40.3
Reform	Marc Stanley	970	39.2
Labour	Lynda Heath*	915	37.0
Labour	Lynn Worrall*	895	36.2
Labour	Cici Manwa*	770	31.1
Green	Zoe Duran	464	18.7
Green	Howard Simmons	400	16.2
Conservative	Michael Antai	317	12.8
Conservative	Gurkiran Maan	277	11.2
Conservative	Harold Ogunfemi	232	9.4
Liberal Democrats	Simon Lancaster	183	7.4
Turnout		2,670	34.7
Registered electors		7,689	
Reform win (new seat)			
Reform win (new seat)			
Reform win (new seat)			

=== Little Thurrock Blackshots ===
Little Thurrock Blackshots (2 seats)
Party	Candidate	Votes	%	±%
Reform	Steven Pester	1,242	52.4	N/A
Reform	Robert Willoughby	1,205	50.8	N/A
Conservative	Lizzie Rigby	575	24.3	–16.9
Labour	Mike Fletcher*	505	21.2	–27.0
Conservative	Joglur Rahman	499	21.0	–20.2
Labour	Abidemi Agidee-Adekunle	375	15.8	–32.5
Green	Laura Perrett	341	14.4	+3.9
Turnout		2,511	46.6	+17.2
Registered electors		5,383		
Reform gain from Conservative				
Reform gain from Labour				

=== Little Thurrock Rectory ===
Little Thurrock Rectory (2 seats)
Party	Candidate	Votes	%	±%
Reform	Marion Cherry	1,016	53.1	N/A
Reform	Eddie Stringer	967	50.5	N/A
Labour	Marcel Abaneke	444	23.2	–14.4
Labour	Sanjit Das	437	22.8	–14.8
Conservative	Allen Mayes	304	15.9	–23.8
Conservative	David Morgan	273	14.3	–25.4
Green	Davina Wager	266	13.9	N/A
Independent	Jay Hayers	119	6.2	N/A
Turnout		2,078	41.4	+9.1
Registered electors		5,025		
Reform gain from Conservative				
Reform gain from Conservative				

=== Ockendon ===
Ockendon (3 seats)
Party	Candidate	Votes	%	±%
Reform	Alan Benson*	1,500	57.6	N/A
Reform	Russ Cherry*	1,473	56.6	N/A
Reform	Jay Varley	1,324	50.9	N/A
Labour	Jayden O'Brien	607	23.3	–29.8
Labour	Peter Singh	521	20.0	–33.1
Conservative	Sue Johnson	506	19.4	–27.5
Green	Rory Hildick	468	18.0	N/A
Conservative	Leo Dredge	442	17.0	–29.9
Conservative	Graham Snell	421	16.2	–30.7
Labour	Prince Ogbomoh	410	15.7	–37.4
Independent	Kameel Mohammed	138	5.3	N/A
Turnout		2,857	34.6	+5.6
Registered electors		8,243		
Reform hold				
Reform hold				
Reform gain from Conservative				

=== Orsett, Horndon & Bulphan ===
Orsett, Horndon & Bulphan (2 seats)
Party	Candidate	Votes	%
Reform	Bill Cook	1,451	57.8
Reform	Steve Taylor	1,411	56.2
Conservative	David Day*	550	21.9
Conservative	Barry Johnson*	510	20.3
Independent	Jack Speight	394	15.7
Labour	Martin Kerin*	244	9.7
Green	Daniel Fallows	234	9.3
Labour	Carlos Diaz	231	9.2
Turnout		2,711	50.6
Registered electors		5,356	
Reform win (new seat)			
Reform win (new seat)			

=== Purfleet-on-Thames ===
Purfleet-on-Thames (2 seats)
Party	Candidate	Votes	%
Labour	Aaron Green*	515	40.6
Reform	Michelle Heal	475	37.5
Reform	Danny Reynolds	458	36.1
Labour	Lee Watson*	451	35.6
Green	David Beesley	290	22.9
Conservative	Angela Bolesworth	187	14.8
Conservative	Cornell Olive Heiser	158	12.5
Turnout		1,376	29.3
Registered electors		4,699	
Labour win (new seat)			
Reform win (new seat)			

=== Stanford-le-Hope South ===
Stanford-le-Hope South (3)
Party	Candidate	Votes	%
Reform	Alex Anderson*	1,864	59.3
Reform	Mark Turner	1,658	52.8
Reform	James Poyntz	1,592	50.7
Independent	Neil Speight*	1,283	40.8
Green	Michelle Brownscombe-Adu	494	15.7
Labour	Teresa O'Keeffe	482	15.3
Green	Steven Woolrich	466	14.8
Labour	Phil Smith	434	13.8
Labour	Suraj Lohia	384	12.2
Conservative	Mitchell Uncle	287	9.1
Conservative	Andrea Ekong	277	8.8
Conservative	Bunmi Ojetola	206	6.6
Turnout		3,607	43.7
Registered electors		8,259	
Reform win (new seat)			
Reform win (new seat)			
Reform win (new seat)			

=== Stifford ===
Stifford (2 seats)
Party	Candidate	Votes	%
Reform	Richard Bingley	1,115	56.4
Reform	Bill Mumford	1,112	56.2
Labour	Mark Hooper*	576	29.1
Labour	Sam Thomas	329	16.6
Conservative	Alex Howell	301	15.2
Conservative	Joy Redsell	283	14.3
Green	Kevin Rankin	238	12.0
Turnout		2,224	41.0
Registered electors		5,425	
Reform win (new seat)			
Reform win (new seat)			

=== The Homesteads & Stanford-le-Hope North ===
The Homesteads & Stanford-le-Hope North (3 seats)
Party	Candidate	Votes	%
Reform	Pam McCabe	1,580	56.7
Reform	Joanne Quirk	1,566	56.2
Reform	James Scarsbrook	1,438	51.6
Independent	Gary Byrne*	1,143	41.0
Labour	Gena White	457	16.4
Green	Eric Bevan	449	16.1
Conservative	Gary Collins	404	14.5
Labour	Mark Kimpton	365	13.1
Conservative	Esther Ajilore	350	12.6
Labour	Brian Whiten	325	11.7
Conservative	Hanna Uwakwe-Mangse	284	10.2
Turnout		3,271	45.9
Registered electors		7,120	
Reform win (new seat)			
Reform win (new seat)			
Reform win (new seat)			

=== Tilbury Riverside ===
Tilbury Riverside (2 seats)
Party	Candidate	Votes	%
Reform	David Hollenbach	613	50.6
Reform	Harley Pyman-Brickwood	539	44.5
Labour	Christina Dallyn	467	38.5
Labour	Mina Hoque	398	32.8
Green	Emmanuel Andrews	235	19.4
Conservative	Michelle Macadangdang	88	7.3
Conservative	Dennis Maney	85	7.0
Turnout		1,364	30.4
Registered electors		4,487	
Reform win (new seat)			
Reform win (new seat)			

=== Tilbury St Chads ===
Tilbury St Chads (2 seats)
Party	Candidate	Votes	%	±%
Reform	Shirley Bartlett	703	55.7	N/A
Reform	Bailey Scott	675	53.5	N/A
Labour	Clare Baldwin	412	32.7	–47.3
Labour	Steve Liddiard*	381	30.2	–49.8
Green	Alfie Rees	177	14.0	N/A
Conservative	Ben Maney*	93	7.4	–12.6
Conservative	Devante Likando	81	6.4	–13.6
Turnout		1,420	31.5	+12.8
Registered electors		4,498		
Reform gain from Labour				
Reform gain from Labour				

=== West Thurrock & South Stifford ===
West Thurrock & South Stifford (2 seats)
Party	Candidate	Votes	%	±%
Conservative	Qaisar Abbas*	669	44.8	+18.6
Conservative	Elena Pelin	499	33.4	+7.2
Reform	John Pearson	445	29.8	N/A
Reform	Vincent Bye	426	28.5	N/A
Labour	Shalini Bhatt	372	24.9	–38.4
Labour	Ron Green	318	21.3	–42.0
Green	Chris Gilbody	257	17.2	+6.7
Turnout		2,224	41.0	+18.8
Registered electors		5,424		
Conservative hold				
Conservative gain from Labour				

== Post-election changes ==
=== By-elections ===
==== Grays Town ====
Grays Town by-election: 23 July 2026 Resignation of Marc Stanley (Reform)
Party	Candidate	Votes	%	±%
Labour	Amin Hoque	673	37.0	+5.3
Reform	John Pearson	491	27.0	−7.8
Independent	Neil Speight	235	12.9	N/A
Conservative	Joglur Rahman	224	12.3	+1.3
Green	Rhea Nathan	160	8.8	−7.3
Liberal Democrats	Simon Lancaster	34	1.9	−4.4
Majority		182	10.0	N/A
Turnout		1,825	23.8	–10.9
Registered electors		7,667		
Labour gain from Reform		Swing	▲6.6	

==== Grays Riverside ====
Grays Riverside by-election: 23 July 2026 Resignation of Joe Soper (Reform)
Party	Candidate	Votes	%	±%
Labour	Jo Potter	389	30.2	▲3.8
Reform	Jason Mitchell	362	28.1	▼5.1
Green	Pauline Weir	354	27.5	▲1.9
Conservative	Srikanth Panjala	182	14.1	▲3.1
Majority		27	2.1	N/A
Turnout		1,294	18.9	▼11.8
Registered electors		6,848		
Labour gain from Reform		Swing	▲4.5	

== See also ==
- Thurrock Council elections
