= Horndon mint =

Anglo-Saxon mint in Thurrock, Essex

The Horndon mint was an Anglo-Saxon mint established at Horndon-on-the-Hill in Thurrock, Essex. It is known from a single coin of the reign of Edward the Confessor.

The only surviving example of a coin from the Horndon mint was among the hoard of coins found in the 18th century in a basement near St Mary-at-Hill church, in the ward of Billingsgate, London, England. The coin is described as being of the sovereign/martlet type, with the head of the sovereign and a martlet mint mark; it was minted between 1056 and 1059. It bears the inscription Dudinc on Hornidune on the reverse. Hornidune is the earliest recorded form of Horndon, which appears in the Domesday Book of 1086 as Horniduna.

The moneyer, Dudinc, has the same name as someone striking coins in London for Harold Harefoot and Edward the Confessor. There is an "almost inescapable" conclusion that they were the same man.

From the reign of King Edgar onwards many mints were established to meet the need for new coins when the older ones were withdrawn. This happened regularly, partly to counteract inflation, but also to provide income to the king.

The existence of a mint at Horndon is described by Frank Stenton as signifying "a claim to be regarded as a borough" and Horndon was noted as an Anglo-Saxon town by Aston and Bond based on possession of a mint. A number of small mints were established during the reign of Edward the Confessor, but the choice of Horndon which was an "undistinguished village" is not obvious. Sydney suggests that the solution may be that the manor of Horndon was under the influence of Robert FitzWimarc and his son Swein of Essex, a powerful and ambitious local family.
