= Fobbing =

Village in Essex, England

Coordinates: 51.53395°N 0.474129°E

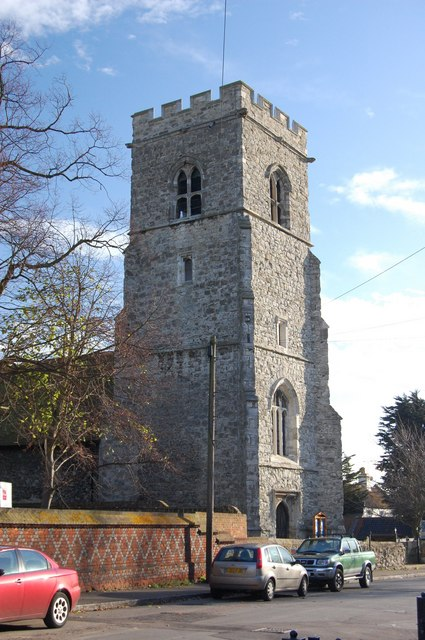
- Tower of St Michael's Church

- Location within Essex
- Population: 913 (Built up area, 2021)
- OS grid reference: TQ715845
- Unitary authority: Thurrock
- Shire county: Essex
- Region: East
- Country: England
- Sovereign state: United Kingdom
- Post town: Stanford-le-Hope
- Postcode district: SS17
- Police: Essex
- Fire: Essex
- Ambulance: East of England
- UK Parliament: South Basildon and East Thurrock

Fobbing is a village in the borough of Thurrock in Essex, England. It is between Basildon and Corringham, and is also close to Stanford-le-Hope, the latter being its post town. At the 2021 census the Fobbing built up area had a population of 913.

Fobbing was an ancient parish. It was abolished as a civil parish in 1936 on the creation of Thurrock Urban District, which in turn became the modern borough of Thurrock in 1974. Fobbing remains an ecclesiastical parish in the Church of England.

The village has one of the seven conservation areas in Thurrock.

== History ==
The place-name Fobbing is first attested in the Domesday Book of 1086, where it appears as Phobinge. It appears as Fobinges in 1125, and Fobbinges in 1227. The name means "Fobba's people", Fobba being a shortened form of the name Folcheorht.

Fobbing was one of the main villages involved with the Peasants' Revolt. On 30 May 1381, the commissioner John Bampton summoned the Fobbing villagers, as well as villagers from Corringham and Stanford, to Brentwood to answer as to why they had not paid tax. The villagers told Bampton that they would give him nothing. Bampton then moved to arrest the villagers. A riot ensued in which the villagers attempted to kill Bampton, who managed to escape to London. Sir Robert Belknap was sent to investigate the incident and to punish the offenders. On 2 June, he was attacked. By this time the violent discontent had spread, and the counties of Essex and Kent were in full revolt. Soon people moved on London in an armed uprising. In 1990, a metal sculpture by Ben Coode-Adams was erected as a memorial to the Peasants' Revolt at Fobbing.

St. Michael's Church is known for its historic association with the smuggling trade. At one time the church was near the waterfront of Fobbing Harbour. Smugglers sailed up Fobbing Creek guided by the distinctive church tower but after the great flood of 1 February 1953, the creek and harbour were sealed up by a dyke and drained. Underneath the church there are claimed to be many tunnels which were used by smugglers in the 14th century.

=== Administrative history ===
Fobbing was an ancient parish in the Barstable Hundred of Essex. When elected parish and district councils were established in 1894 it was included in the Orsett Rural District. The civil parish and the rural district were both abolished in 1936 when most of the old parish was included in the new Thurrock Urban District. A smaller part of the old parish was transferred instead to the parish of Lee Chapel. At the 1931 census (the last before the abolition of the civil parish), Fobbing had a population of 734.

Although abolished as a civil parish in 1936, Fobbing remains an ecclesiastical parish in the Church of England.

== Public house ==
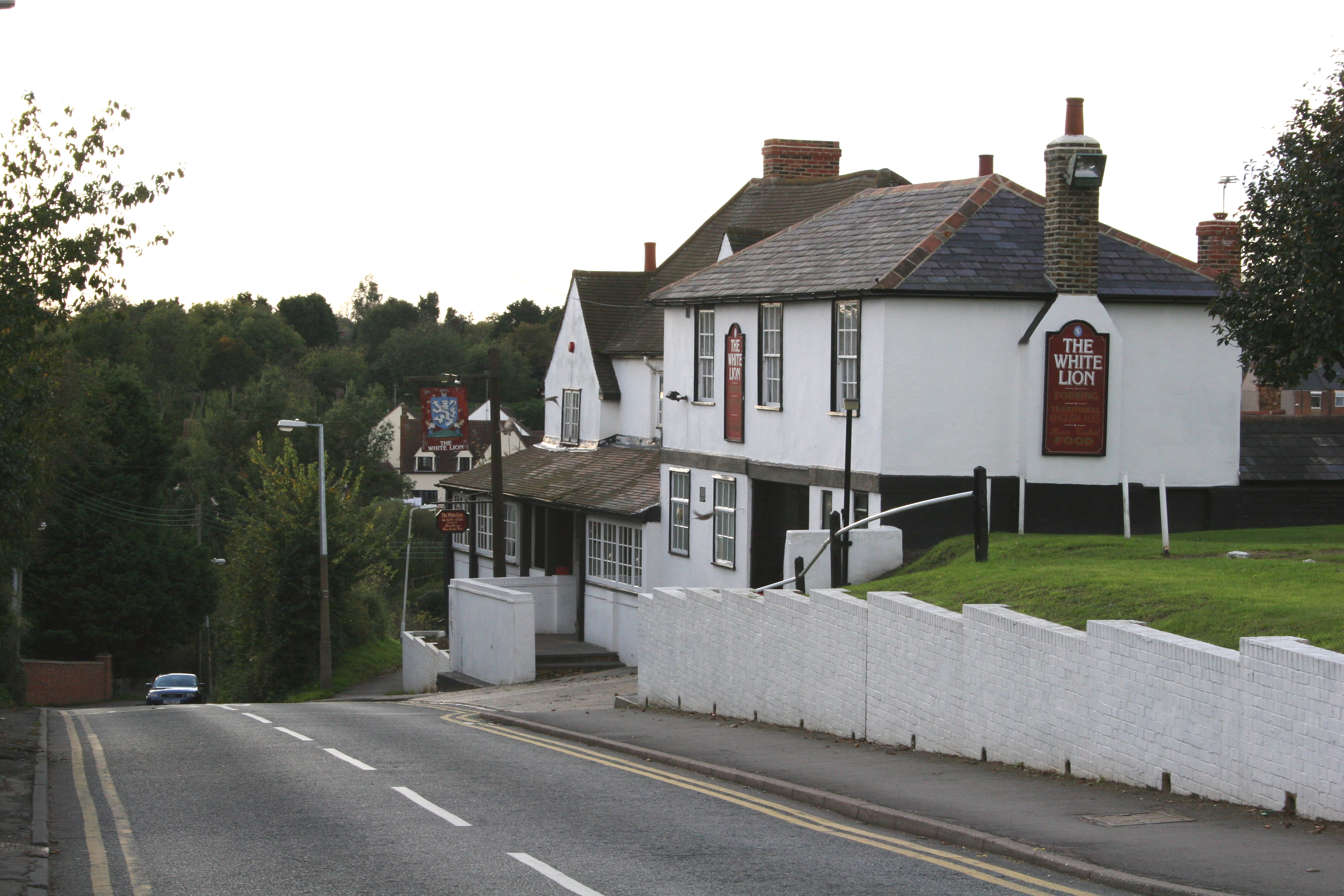
The White Lion

The White Lion public house is at the top of Lion Hill.

== Notable people ==
- The mathematician John Pell was appointed rector here in 1661.
- Thomas Baker (Peasants' Revolt leader) was born in Fobbing.
