= Roberts baronets of Bow (1681) =

Escutcheon of the Roberts baronets of Bow, appearing in the 1st and 4th quarters of the Roberts monument in Bromley Church

The Roberts Baronetcy, of Bow in the County of Essex (Middlesex, in fact), was created in the Baronetage of England on 2 February 1681 for the merchant and landowner John Roberts. The title became extinct on his death in 1692.

== Roberts baronets, of Bow (1681) ==
- Sir John Roberts, 1st Baronet (c. 1620–1692).

Roberts owned the Manor House, Upper Bromley, built by Sir John Jacob, 1st Baronet who died in 1666, with the manor. There was a memorial to him in St Mary's Church, Bromley St Leonard's, destroyed in World War II; a design for it has been attributed to William Stanton. The monument was constructed by Roberts for his first wife Margery Amy; it had a later inscription added by his widowed second wife Deborah. She then remarried to Sir Joseph Tyley (surname given as Tity in Cokayne); there was litigation in Tyley v Roberts about the estate, a leading case about new trial.

Roberts was a lay impropriator of the Bromley church from 1662, and claimed it to be outside the jurisdiction of the Bishop of London. In 1678 he chose, with the support of the congregation, the Cambridge graduate William Wray as minister there, then vicar of East Tilbury. He was perpetual curate at the church from 1681; officially, however, he was rector of West Tilbury from 1682. The state of blessedness by W.W., a sermon on Colossians, 1:12 by "W. W., M.A. and chaplain to a person of honour", was published in 1681, with a dedication to "The Right Worshipful Sir John Roberts Baronett."
