= South Ockendon =

Town in Essex, England

Coordinates: 51.5207°N 0.2956°E

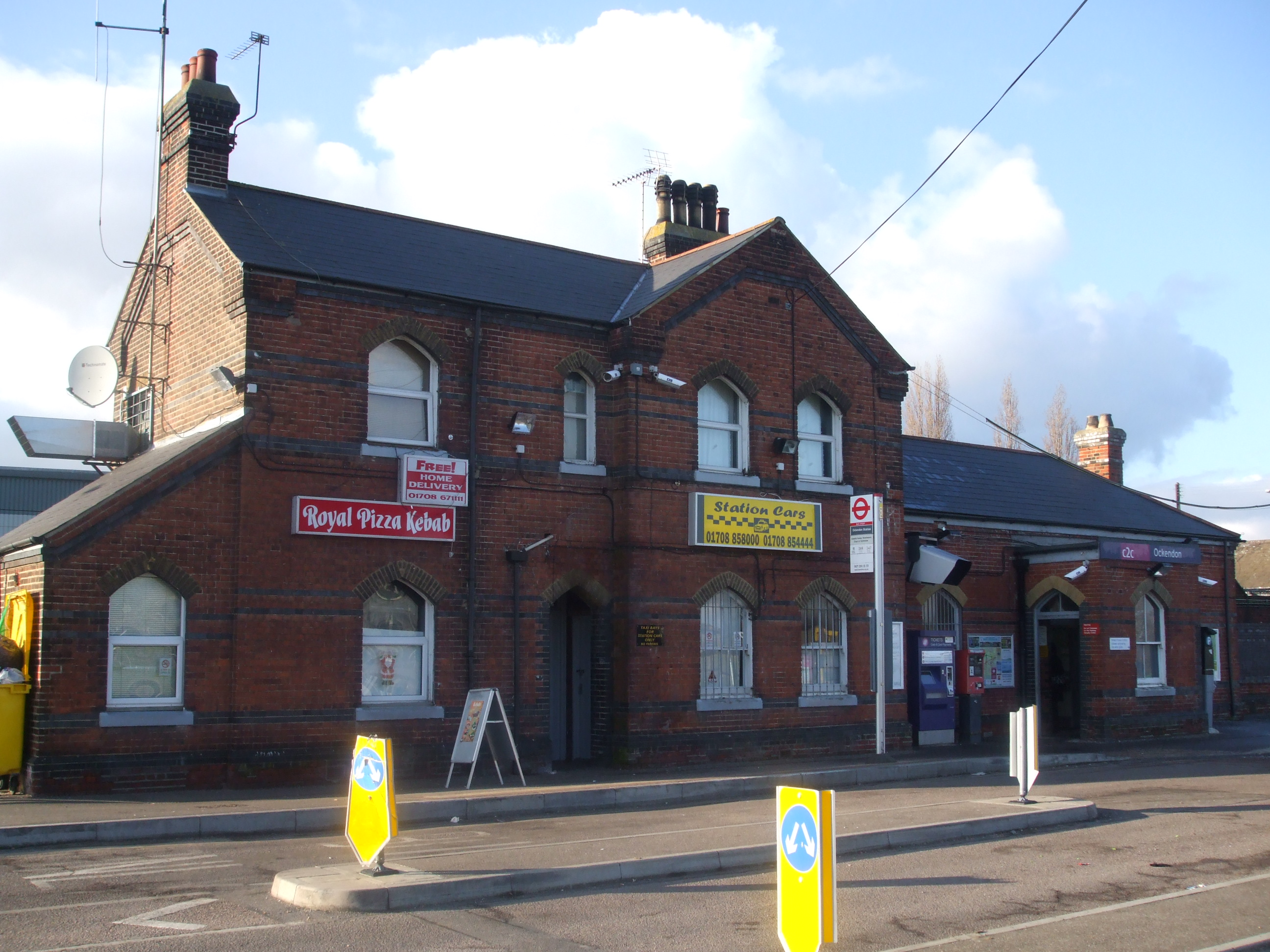
- Ockendon Station

- Location within Essex
- Area: 3.77 km^{2} (1.46 sq mi)
- Population: 22,440 (Built up area, 2021)
  - Density: 5,952/km^{2} (15,420/sq mi)
- OS grid reference: TQ592827
- Unitary authority: Thurrock
- Ceremonial county: Essex
- Region: East
- Country: England
- Sovereign state: United Kingdom
- Post town: SOUTH OCKENDON
- Postcode district: RM15
- Dialling code: 01708
- Police: Essex
- Fire: Essex
- Ambulance: East of England
- UK Parliament: Thurrock

South Ockendon is a town in the borough of Thurrock in Essex, England. It is located close to the border with Greater London, just outside the M25 motorway. The area to the north is North Ockendon. South Ockendon was historically a parish; the parish was abolished for civil purposes in 1936 when South Ockendon became part of Thurrock. At the 2021 census the built up area of South Ockendon had a population of 22,440.

== History ==
South Ockendon was an ancient parish in the Hundred of Chafford in Essex. It was a village before the Norman Conquest, and had a priest in 1085, suggesting it was already a parish by then. It is listed in the Domesday Book of 1086 as "Wocheduna". The name is conjecturally supposed to come from a Saxon chief, Wocca, whose tribe allegedly lived on a hill. The suffix "don" in Old English means a low hill in open country.

When elected parish and district councils were established under the Local Government Act 1894, South Ockendon was given a parish council and included in the Orsett Rural District. In 1929, South Ockendon and the neighbouring parishes of Aveley and West Thurrock were removed from Orsett Rural District to become the short-lived Purfleet Urban District. As part of that reform, South Ockendon was reclassified as an urban parish and so lost its parish council; the lowest elected tier of local government was Purfleet Urban District Council. The Purfleet Urban District was abolished just seven years later in 1936, becoming part of Thurrock Urban District. The civil parish of South Ockendon was abolished as part of the 1936 reforms, becoming part of a single parish of Thurrock covering the same area as the urban district. At the 1931 census (the last before the abolition of the civil parish), South Ockendon had a population of 1,355.

Until the late 1940s, the village centred on the village green, with its Norman church of St Nicholas of Myra and the adjoining Royal Oak, a 14th-century tavern with a 17th-century northern extension. North, South and West Roads all converge on the green. The railway through Ockendon station was built in 1892 as a through line from Tilbury Dock to the Midlands and further via Upminster and Romford and now is a major commuter route between Southend and Fenchurch Street via Barking.

In 1912, Mollands Farm, to the south of the original village, was acquired for use as a rehabilitation facility for people with learning disabilities, who were put to useful work on the farm. Over time the farm developed into a major mental hospital called South Ockendon Hospital, known locally as "the colony". The hospital closed in 1994 and most of the buildings were subsequently demolished and the site was redeveloped as the Brandon Groves Estate.

South Ockendon village became a location for prefabricated houses (prefabs) accommodating bombed-out residents of East London/West Essex in the late 1940s. The majority of these were demolished in the late 1960s when a large Greater London Council estate, Lecaplan concrete construction homes – the Flowers' Estate – was built to replace them, once more with pre-fabricated dwellings, albeit of a superior design. The Lecaplan Type B form of pre-cast concrete (large panel concrete) terrace is constructed in rows of eight properties to a design by J C Tilley and manufactured by W. & C. French.

In the 1970s the Ford Motor Company factory at Aveley housed Ford's Advanced Vehicle Operations which built cars such as the RS1600. The plant was wound down gradually from the late 1990s but closed entirely in 2004, when the last 150 jobs were lost. The majority of the 150 workers accepted transfers to other Ford or ancillary sites around Essex. The 'Aveley' plant was situated along and west of the railway line, adjacent to Ockendon station in the Belhus Ward that part of Ockendon has now been developed into new housing estates, with street names after famous Ford vehicles in keeping with the sites history.

== Transport ==
The town is served by Ockendon railway station on the Ockendon branch of the London, Tilbury and Southend Line. Train services are operated by c2c and provide connections to London Fenchurch Street, Grays, Tilbury, Southend-on-Sea and Shoeburyness.

London Buses route 370, Ensignbus route 22 and NIBS Buses route 269 serve the town. These buses provide connections to Lakeside Shopping Centre, Romford, Upminster, Grays, Tilbury and Brentwood.

== Education ==
Secondary education is provided by Harris Academy Ockendon (formally known as The Ockendon Academy, prior to that it was called The Ockendon School. Other schools in Ockendon included Culverhouse Comprehensive School which was demolished in 1992 and Lennard's Secondary Modern School). The Ockendon Academy joined the Harris family of schools in September 2019, with the aim to improve academic performance.

== Notable people ==
- Michelle Agyemang (born 2006), footballer for the England national team
- Russ Bray (born 1957), former Professional Darts Referee for the Professional Darts Corporation
