= Belmont Castle =

Former English mansion

Coordinates: 51.483°N 0.309°E

Belmont Castle depicted in 1797

Belmont Castle was a neo-Gothic mansion near Grays in the English county of Essex. Built c. 1795 to designs by the little-known Thomas Jeffery, and surrounded by extensive pleasure grounds, it was the most prominent building in the parish, but was demolished in 1943 to make way for a chalk quarry. The castle and its occupants had played a significant role in the town's life for over a hundred years. The name has been adopted by a primary school - Belmont Castle Academy.

== History ==
Belmont Castle was built c. 1795 for Zachariah Button, a wealthy local landowner, who also owned a neighbouring chalk quarry. During the 1840s, when the property was occupied by the Webb family, it was the seat of local cricket matches as well as a circle of music lovers mentioned by the pianist and writer Alice Diehl in her memoirs. One of its later owners, Edward R. Parker, who lived at Belmont Castle from 1880 until 1900, was chairman of the board of governors Orsett of the Poor Law Union board of governors. During his time there, Belmont's park was often used for local events, including a political rally in support of the Franchise Bill attended by 2000-3000 people in 1884. In the 20th century, the house was only sporadically occupied and chalk quarries increasingly encroached upon the pleasure grounds, although they were still used for charity fetes into the 1930s. When the Dobree family, the last tenants of the entire house, departed in 1930, the mansion was divided into individual rented flats and meeting rooms. The remaining land was let out to local farmers for grazing cattle and to the Tilbury Gas Company who used the North Lawn as a sports field and rented part of the mansion to use for changing rooms. The last owner of the property was the Associated Portland Cement Company, who had the mansion demolished in 1943 to make way for yet another chalk quarry.

== Architecture ==
Belmont Castle seen from the River Thames c. 1830

The house was designed as an imitation of a medieval baronial castle with battlements and a four-story tower overlooking the River Thames. Early visitors commented on the luxuriousness and elegance of its interior fittings which matched the neo-Gothic style of its exterior. The library was oval shaped with fitted book cases and mouldings and opened out to a double flight of stone steps descending to a terrace. Its grounds contained a large walled kitchen garden which included fruit trees and a hothouse. Surrounding the house were extensive pleasure grounds, landscaped with forest trees, shrubs, and plants. These terminated on the west side at a Gothic temple and on the east with an orchard and paddock. The house had two approaches: the first from a lodge (also built in the Gothic style) on the south lawn near the road between West Thurrock and Grays, and the second from the north lawn via the road from Stifford village. The estate was situated over a medieval rural settlement and had several dene holes which were covered over during the landscaping of the pleasure grounds.

== Sources ==
- Carney, T. J., "A Picturesque Object", the story of Belmont Castle, Grays, originally published in Panorama, No. 28, Thurrock Local History Society, 1986
- Coller, Duffield William, The people's history of Essex, Meggy and Chalk, 1861, p. 358
- Colvin, Howard, A Biographical Dictionary of British Architects, 1600-1840, 3rd ed. 1995, s.v. "Jeffery, Thomas".
- Diehl, Alice M. The True Story of my Life, J. Lane, 1908
- Essex County Council, Essex Thames Gateway Historic Environment Characterisation, 2007, pp. 73–74
- Hughson, David, London; being an accurate history and description of the British metropolis and its neighbourhood: to thirty miles extent, from an actual perambulation, Volume 6, J. Stratford, 1809, p. 210
- Powell, W. R. (editor), A History of the County of Essex, Volume 8, 1983, pp. 35–56
