= Orsett Rural District =

Former local government area in the UK

Orsett
- Rural district
- Area
  - 1911: 39,939 acres (161.63 km^{2})
  - 1931: 29,158 acres (118.00 km^{2})
  - Coordinates: 51.50°N 0.35°E
- Area transferred
  - 1912: All of Chadwell St Mary to Tilbury Urban District
  - 1929: All of Aveley, South Ockendon and West Thurrock to Purfleet Urban District
  - 1934: Parts of Corringham, Fobbing and Laindon Hills to Billericay Urban District
- Population
  - 1901: 19,912
  - 1931: 20,525
- Density
  - 1901: 0.51/acre
  - 1931: 0.70/acre
- History
  - Origin: Orsett Rural Sanitary District
  - Created: 1894
  - Abolished: 1936
  - Succeeded by: Thurrock Urban District with part to Hornchurch Urban District
- Status: Rural district
- Government: Orsett Rural District Council
- Subdivisions
  - Type: Parishes
  - Units: Aveley; Bulphan; Chadwell St Mary; Corringham; East Tilbury; Fobbing; Horndon-on-the-Hill; Langdon Hills; Little Thurrock; Mucking; North Ockendon; Orsett; South Ockendon; Stanford-le-Hope; Stifford; West Thurrock; West Tilbury
- Today part of: Thurrock with parts in Basildon and Havering

Orsett Rural District was a rural district in Essex, England, from 1894 to 1936. It covered Orsett and surrounding parishes near the Thames Estuary in the south of the county. It was abolished in 1936, when most of the area became part of the new Thurrock Urban District, which in turn became the borough of Thurrock in 1974.

== History ==
The district had its origins in the Orsett Poor Law Union, which had been created in 1835 for a group of 18 parishes to collectively deliver their responsibilities under the poor laws. A workhouse to serve the union was built in 1837 on Rowley Road in Orsett.

In 1872, sanitary districts were established. In rural areas, public health and local government responsibilities were given to the existing boards of guardians of poor law unions. The Orsett Rural Sanitary District initially covered the whole poor law union, as there were no areas within it which qualified to be urban sanitary districts. The parish of Grays Thurrock (generally known as Grays) was removed from the rural sanitary district in 1886 when it was made its own urban sanitary district.

Rural sanitary districts were reconstituted as rural districts with their own elected councils with effect from 28 December 1894, under the Local Government Act 1894. The link with the poor law union continued in that all the rural district councillors were thereafter ex officio members of the board of guardians. Orsett Rural District Council held its first meeting on 3 January 1895. Samuel Westwood Squier, a brewer from Stanford-le-Hope who had been chairman of the board of guardians since 1880, was appointed the first chairman of the council, a post he held until 1897.

The rural district council met at the workhouse in Orsett and had its main offices at 2 Orsett Road in Grays, the latter being outside the council's own administrative area. After the council's abolition the workhouse became Orsett Hospital, which was completely rebuilt in the 1960s.

In 1902 the parish council of Chadwell St Mary made a request to be converted into an urban district council. Three schemes were considered at an inquiry in 1912: conversion of Chadwell St Mary parish to an urban district, amalgamation of Chadwell St Mary and Little Thurrock as a new urban district, and expansion of Grays Urban District to include Chadwell St Mary, Little Thurrock, West Thurrock and part of Stifford. Following the inquiry, the Chadwell St Mary parish was removed from the rural district in 1912 to form the Tilbury Urban District.

In 1929 Purfleet Urban District was formed from the parishes of Aveley, South Ockendon and West Thurrock.

In 1934 parts of Corringham, Fobbing and Langdon Hills became part of the new Billericay Urban District.

In 1936 the rural district and its constituent parishes were abolished. Most of its former area became part of the new Thurrock Urban District. The greater part of North Ockendon was transferred to Hornchurch Urban District.

The Thurrock Urban District was replaced by the modern borough of Thurrock in 1974, subject to a minor boundary adjustment with Basildon in the Langdon Hills area to place the whole designated area for the new town of Basildon in that district.

== Parishes ==
Orsett Rural District comprised the following civil parishes:

- Aveley (until 1929)
- Bulphan
- Chadwell St Mary (until 1912)
- Corringham
- East Tilbury
- Fobbing
- Horndon-on-the-Hill
- Langdon Hills
- Little Thurrock
- Mucking
- North Ockendon
- Orsett
- South Ockendon (until 1929)
- Stanford-le-Hope
- Stifford
- West Thurrock (until 1929)
- West Tilbury
