= Purfleet =

Town in Essex, England

Coordinates: 51.480°N 0.250°E

Purfleet-on-Thames
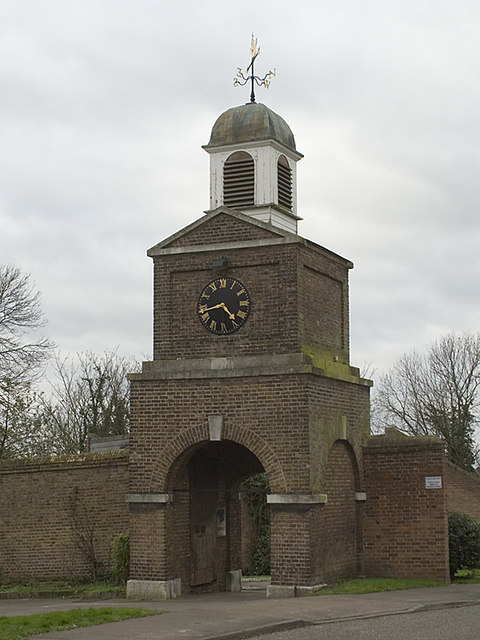
- Gateway Clocktower

- Location within Essex
- Population: 5,883 (2021)
- OS grid reference: TQ555775
- Unitary authority: Thurrock
- Ceremonial county: Essex
- Region: East
- Country: England
- Sovereign state: United Kingdom
- Post town: PURFLEET
- Postcode district: RM19
- Dialling code: 01708
- Police: Essex
- Fire: Essex
- Ambulance: East of England
- UK Parliament: Thurrock

Purfleet-on-Thames, often known as just Purfleet is a town in the Thurrock unitary authority, Essex, England.

It is bordered by the A13 road to the north and the River Thames to the south and is within the easternmost part of the M25 motorway but just outside the Greater London boundary. It was within the traditional Church of England parish of West Thurrock. Some industry is located to the south and the area forms part of the Thames Gateway redevelopment area. Purfleet is one of seven conservation areas in Thurrock.

== History ==
The place-name "Purfleet" is first attested in 1285, where it appears as Purteflyete. It is recorded as Pourteflet in the Close Roll for 1312. The name means "Purta's stream or tidal inlet".

In the 18th century, Purfleet Royal Gunpowder Magazine was established as a location for the storage of gunpowder together with a garrison to protect it. A constant danger of explosion as a result of lightning strikes existed. Benjamin Franklin was asked for advice on the design of a lightning conductor and a committee of the Royal Society supported his design for pointed conductors. After the American Revolution the powder store was protected from lightning which hit the building, though metal drainpipes actually did the work. When King George III heard of this, he insisted they be replaced with blunt conductors and the president of the Royal Society was forced to resign.

Magazine number 5, the only one remaining of the original five, is now the Purfleet Garrison Heritage and Military Centre and a Scheduled Ancient Monument. It is run by volunteers and contains a wide range of local and military memorabilia (including items from RAF Hornchurch) and is open to the public on Thursdays, Sundays and bank holidays.

J. M. W. Turner (1775–1851) made sketches of Purfleet in 1805–08 mainly featuring the Powder Magazines. The sketches are collected in the River and Margate Sketchbook which are part of the Tate Britain collection and accepted as part of the Turner Bequest in 1856.

Other surviving 18th-century buildings include the proofing house (now used for community activities) and the gatehouse clock tower (described by English Heritage as forming "an integral part of the finest ensemble in any of the Ordnance Yards, consistent with the high standards practised by the Ordnance Board in its designs for fortifications and barracks from the C17").

In his history of Essex (1848) W. White describes Purfleet as having 704 inhabitants including 199 from the barracks. "Purfleet is a village and military station...at the mouth of a rivulet, and at the west end of West Thurrock ... sometimes called a township ... and has a pleasure fair on the 13th of June. Near it are the extensive limeade chalk pits of W.H. Whitbread, the lord of the manor. The harbour is often full of shipping business and animation: and joining it is a large government powder magazine, consisting of five detached bomb-proof and well-protected store-houses, barracks for a company of artillery, a store keeper's mansion, and a good quay. The magazine was built in 1781, and has room for the safe keeping of 60,000 barrels of gunpowder."

In March 1916, anti-aircraft gunners based at Purfleet shot down the German Zeppelin LZ 48 (also listed as L15) — the first airship to be destroyed by anti-aircraft artillery. In recognition of their achievement, the gunners received a prize from the Lord Mayor of London, Sir Christopher Wakefield.

Purfleet historically formed part of the ancient parish of West Thurrock. When elected parish and district councils were established under the Local Government Act 1894, West Thurrock was given a parish council and included in the Orsett Rural District. In 1929, West Thurrock and the neighbouring parishes of Aveley and South Ockendon were removed from Orsett Rural District to become a short-lived urban district called Purfleet. The three parishes were classed as urban parishes and so lost their parish councils; the lowest elected tier of local government was the urban district council. Purfleet Urban District and its three constituent parishes were abolished seven years later in 1936, becoming part of Thurrock Urban District. Purfleet Urban District covered an area of 8,900 acres (3,600 ha) and had a population of 8,511 at the 1931 census.

Reflecting its importance as a seaport and storage depot, Purfleet was listed by the Ministry of Food as one of 14 sensitive A-bomb targets in 1955, including an entrepot for the import of tea.

In Bram Stoker's novel Dracula, first published in 1897, Count Dracula purchased the fictional house called "Carfax" in Purfleet, which was next to a lunatic asylum.

In 2020, after a two-year campaign, the town's name was officially changed to Purfleet-on-Thames in an attempt to improve its fortunes and attract more investment.

== High House Production Park ==
In 2006 Thurrock Thames Gateway Development Corporation initiated a project to regenerate High House, Purfleet by renovating historic farm buildings dating from the 16th century and encouraging the development of some creative-industry buildings on the 14-acre site.

The Royal Opera House's Bob and Tamar Manoukian scene-making facility for its operas and ballets opened on the High House site in December 2010, followed by a Costume Centre in 2015. Creative & Cultural Skills opened The Backstage Centre at the park in March 2013. The Backstage Centre now houses the national headquarters of Creative & Cultural Skills. In July 2013 ACME Studios, opened 43 artist studios in the park.

== Industry ==
Purfleet has been the site of a Unilever (formerly Van den Berghs & Jurgens) factory producing Stork, Flora, Bertolli, and ICBINB! margarine since 1917, reputed to be the largest in the world. It is the location of an Esso lubricants plant, a roll-on/roll-off ferry (RORO) terminal, and the head office of Carpetright, the UK's largest flooring company. It is also home to Scania GB Ltd's largest European workshop/office.

== Nearest places ==
- Aveley
- Wennington
- West Thurrock

== Transport ==
Road transport links connect Purfleet to nearby towns including Basildon and Grays, as well as Lakeside Shopping Centre with buses operated by Ensignbus and NIBS Buses. Railway services operated by c2c from Purfleet station offer regular services to London Fenchurch Street, Barking, Grays, Tilbury and Southend. The town is also one of the termini of the London LOOP long-distance trail.

=== Purfleet Freight Terminal ===
Purfleet Freight Terminal is the closest Roll-on/Roll-off (RORO) ferry port to London. Operated by C.RO Ports, the 92-acre (37 ha) combined freight terminal handles 250,000 lorry trailers and ISO containers and tanks per year, and via a dedicated Pre-Delivery Inspection (PDI) facility, the import/export of 400,000 vehicles. There are four railway sidings on site, accessed via the London, Tilbury and Southend line to allow direct unloading/loading from ferry or lorry to rail. Scheduled ferry services are operated daily by sister-company Cobelfret Ferries to the Port of Zeebrugge, Belgium and the Port of Rotterdam, Netherlands.

== Media ==
The town is served by BBC London and ITV London with television signals received from Crystal Palace TV transmitter, BBC South East and ITV Meridian can also be received from Bluebell Hill TV transmitter.

Local radio stations are BBC Essex, Heart East and Gateway 97.8, a community based radio station.

The Thurrock Gazette is the town's local weekly newspaper.

== Sport ==
Thurrock F.C. (formerly Purfleet F.C.) played in the town until disbanding in 2018, and the local council helps to maintain seven leisure centres and one country club in the Borough, the nearest centre being in Springhouse Road, Corringham. The Circus Tavern in Purfleet was the venue of the PDC World Darts Championship between 1994 and 2007, as well as hosting the Players Championship Finals in 2009 & 2010.
