= Mucking =

Hamlet in Essex, England

Coordinates: 51°30′14″N 0°25′37″E

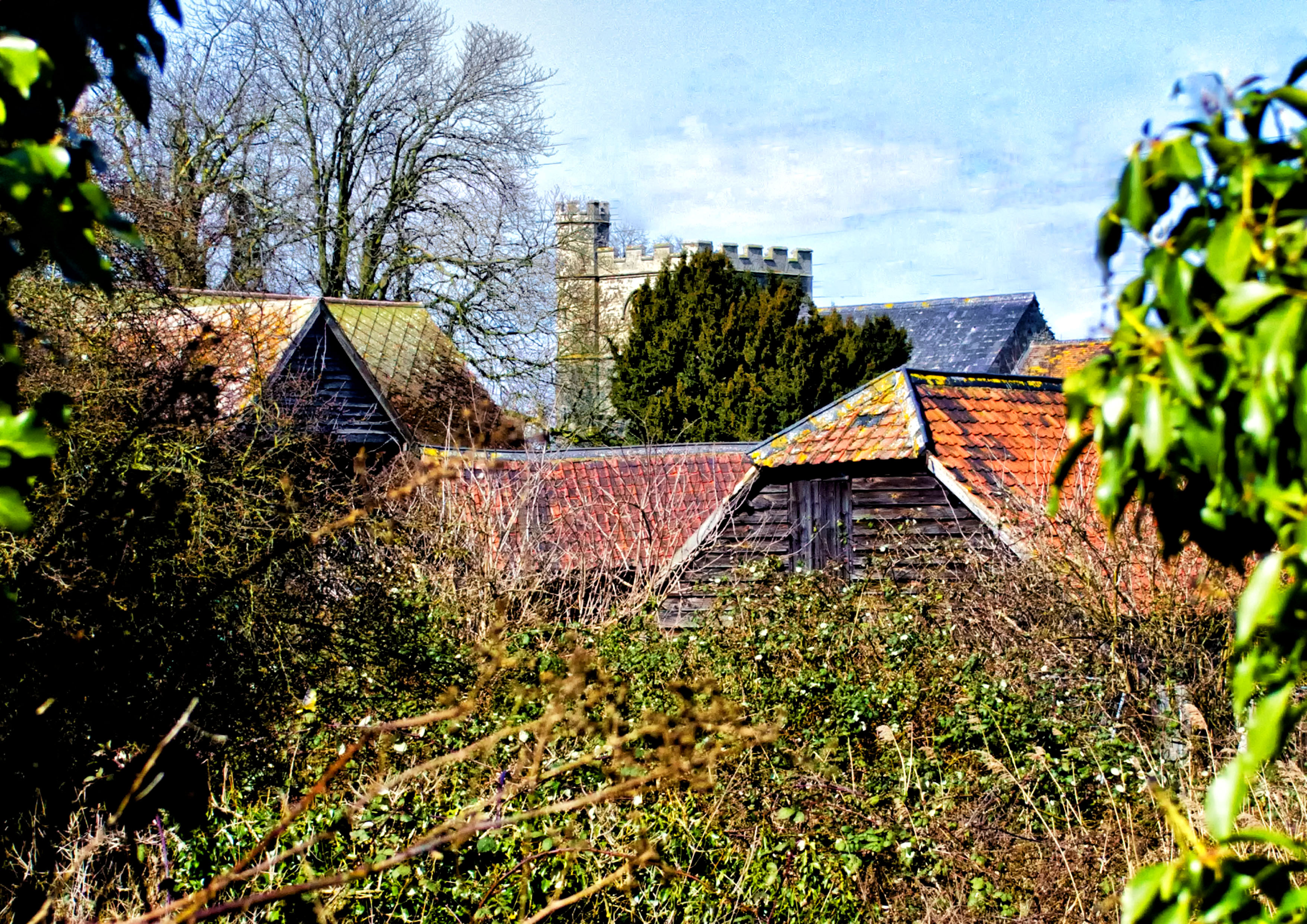

- Location within Essex
- Unitary authority: Thurrock
- Shire county: Essex
- Region: East
- Country: England
- Sovereign state: United Kingdom

Mucking is a hamlet on the north bank of Thames Estuary in the borough of Thurrock in Essex, England. It is located approximately 2 miles (3 km) south of the town of Stanford-le-Hope. Mucking was formerly a parish. The civil parish was abolished in 1936 on the creation of Thurrock Urban District, which became the modern borough of Thurrock in 1974.

== History ==
Mucking was "a particularly extensive Anglo-Saxon settlement, of at least 100+ people, commanding an important strategic position in the Lower Thames region; it may have functioned as a meeting place and mart for surrounding areas on both sides of the Thames". Its name is of Saxon origin and indicates human settlement here for well over a millennium. The meaning is usually given as 'the family (or followers) of Mucca' (Mucca most likely being a local chieftain). However, Margaret Gelling has suggested alternative interpretations – 'Mucca's place' or 'Mucca's stream'. Mucking's geographical location on flat marshland at the very mouth of the River Thames indicates that settlement in the area by Germanic invaders from the continent probably occurred at a relatively early date; indeed, an outline of a now abandoned nearby Saxon village, West Mucking, was discovered from aerial photographs in the 20th century. Mucking was host to a small iron smelting industry because of its workable deposits of iron ore. Spongy iron blooms were produced and had their impurities worked out by a process known as 'Mucking'. It is not known if this process is connected to the village name or a coincidence.

Mucking was an ancient parish in the Barstable Hundred of Essex. As well as the small settlement of Mucking itself, the parish also included surrounding rural areas, including the hamlet of Muckingford, which was renamed Linford in the 19th century. When elected parish and district councils were established in 1894, the parish was included in the Orsett Rural District. The civil parish and rural district were abolished in 1936 on the creation of the new Thurrock Urban District. At the 1931 census (the last before the abolition of the civil parish), Mucking had a population of 498.

== Modern Mucking ==
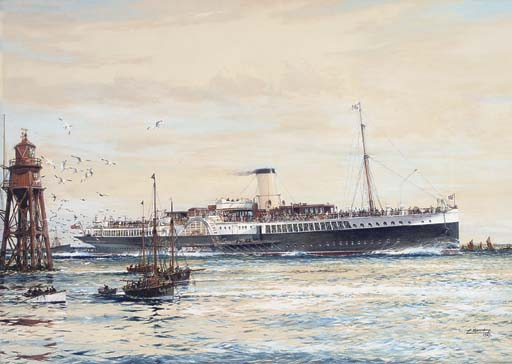
The paddle steamer Crested Eagle passing Mucking Light, by Jack Spurling

Although the population of the hamlet is now less than one hundred, it thrived in Victorian times, boasting small shops, a large rectory and the mediaeval church of St John the Baptist (both of the latter buildings have now been converted to private houses, with access to the church graveyard possible only with prior written permission). The hamlet also gives its name to Mucking Flats, the mudflat on the estuary to the east of the village, one of Essex's Sites of Special Scientific Interest and once the site of a small lighthouse.

On 1 April 1936 the civil parish was abolished to form Thurrock.

== Archaeological excavation ==
Mucking was the location of a major archaeological dig ahead of excavation from the gravel quarry that swallowed it up. The site was discovered by crop marks in the soil photographed by Kenneth St Joseph in 1959. The excavation was directed by Margaret Jones and lasted from 1965 to 1978. In addition to major finds from the Saxon period, other artefacts from the site span the period from the Stone Age through to the medieval period.

The Saxon settlement excavated at Mucking was extensive with more than 230 buildings. The site contained two cemeteries. Many of the buildings were sunken huts although there were timber halls which were possibly occupied by the higher status families. The settlement gradually moved north over the course of two hundred years after its establishment in the 4th century.

== Parish church ==
The parish church was dedicated to St John the Baptist. It was largely demolished and rebuilt in the middle of the 19th century. It was declared redundant as a church and has now been converted to a private dwelling.
