= Roberts baronets of Ecclesall and Queen's Tower (1919) =

Escutcheon of the Roberts baronets of Ecclesall and Queen's Tower

The Roberts baronetcy, of Ecclesall and Queen's Tower in the City of Sheffield and the West Riding of the County of York, was created in the Baronetage of the United Kingdom on 9 September 1919 for Samuel Roberts, Mayor of Sheffield from 1899 to 1900. and he second Baronet was . T

== Roberts baronets, of Ecclesall and Queen's Tower (1919) ==
- Sir Samuel Roberts, 1st Baronet (1852–1926), conservative member of parliament for Ecclesall from 1902 to 1923.
- Sir Samuel Roberts, 2nd Baronet (1882–1955), Lord Mayor of Sheffield from 1919 to 1920 and later represented Hereford and Ecclesall in the House of Commons as a Conservative.
- Sir Peter Geoffrey Roberts, 3rd Baronet (1912–1985), Conservative Member of Parliament for Ecclesall and Heeley.
- Sir Samuel Roberts, 4th Baronet (born 1948)

The heir apparent is the present holder's only son Samuel Roberts (born 1989).
