= Thurrock Urban District =

Former local government area in the UK

Thurrock
- Urban district
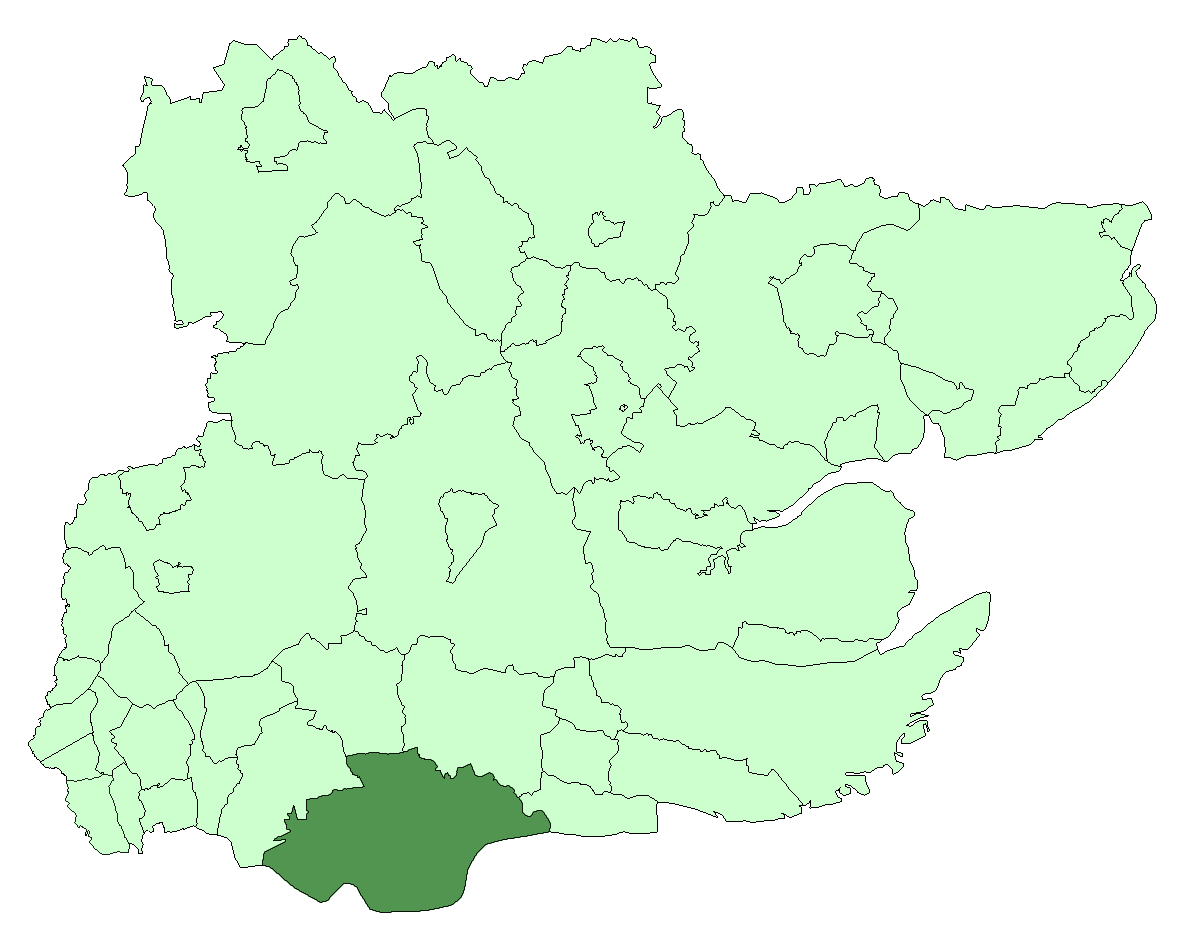
- Thurrock within Essex in 1961
- Area
  - 1936: 38,324 acres (155.09 km^{2})
  - 1974: 40,552 acres (164.11 km^{2})
  - Coordinates: 51.50°N 0.35°E
- Area transferred
  - 1938: Part of Little Burstead from Billericay Urban District
- Population
  - 1939: 63,431
  - 1971: 125,058
- Density
  - 1939: 1.61/acre
  - 1971: 3.08/acre
- History
  - Origin: Grays Urban District; Orsett Rural District; Purfleet Urban District; Tilbury Urban District
  - Created: 1936
  - Abolished: 1974
  - Succeeded by: Thurrock District
- Status: Urban district
- Government: Thurrock Urban District Council
  - HQ: Council Offices, Grays
- Today part of: Thurrock with parts in Basildon

Thurrock was a local government district and civil parish in south Essex, England, from 1936 to 1974.

== Background ==
The district was created as a consequence of the Local Government Act 1929, which compelled county councils to review county districts and make recommendations for changes to the Minister of Health for approval. The subject of amalgamation of riverside parishes was not new, with an unsuccessful proposal in 1911 to expand Grays Urban District to include Chadwell St Mary, Little Thurrock, West Thurrock and part of Stifford. In March 1931, Essex County Council convened a conference of local authorities in the area to solicit their views. The council suggested the breaking up of Orsett Rural District and the enlargement of the existing urban districts of Purfleet (gaining North Ockendon) and Grays Thurrock (gaining Stifford and part of Little Thurrock). Tilbury urban district would be absorbed by a new Orsett urban district formed from the remainder of the rural district. The proposals met with objections from the local authorities. An inquiry was held in November 1932 and the Minister of Health suggested the creation of a new "Riverside" urban district covering the whole area. The county council submitted revised proposals along these lines on 4 October 1933, calling the new district "Orsett". A further local enquiry was held in November 1933 and the changes were approved in December, with the suggestion from the minister that new district should be called "Thurrock". Purfleet Urban District Council took legal action in an attempt to prevent the changes and revert to the earlier scheme, ultimately taking the case to the House of Lords without success.

== History ==
The parish and urban district was formed from the former area of the following civil parishes which had been abolished in 1936:

- From Grays Thurrock Urban District:
  - Grays Thurrock
- From Orsett Rural District:
  - Bulphan
  - Corringham
  - East Tilbury
  - Fobbing
  - Horndon-on-the-Hill
  - Langdon Hills
  - Little Thurrock
  - Mucking
  - North Ockendon (Note: Part of North Ockendon had been transferred to the Cranham parish and Hornchurch Urban District in 1935)
  - Orsett
  - Stanford-le-Hope
  - Stifford
  - West Tilbury
- From Purfleet Urban District:
  - Aveley
  - South Ockendon
  - West Thurrock
- From Tilbury Urban District:
  - Chadwell St Mary

The new urban district council established its headquarters at a converted house called Farley and adjoining buildings around the junction of Whitehall Lane and Palmers Avenue in Grays.

The district was enlarged in 1938 by gaining part of the former Little Burstead parish from Billericay Urban District.

The urban district was abolished in 1974 and replaced with a new non-metropolitan district with borough status called Thurrock. The new borough covered almost the same area as the old urban district, with just a minor adjustment to the boundary with neighbouring Basildon to place the whole designated area for the new town of Basildon in that district. Thurrock Borough Council subsequently became a unitary authority in 1998, taking over county-level services in the borough which until then had been provided by Essex County Council.
