= Roberts baronets of Willesdon (1661) =

Escutcheon of the Roberts baronets of Willesdon

The Roberts baronetcy, of Willesdon (Willesden) in the County of Middlesex, was created in the Baronetage of England on 4 October 1661 for William Roberts, later sitting as Member of Parliament for Middlesex. The title became extinct on the death of the second Baronet in 1698.

== Roberts baronets, of Willesdon (1661) ==
- Sir William Roberts, 1st Baronet (1638–1688)
- Sir William Roberts, 2nd Baronet (1659–1698)
