= East Tilbury =

Village in Essex, England

Coordinates: 51.4657°N 0.4294°E

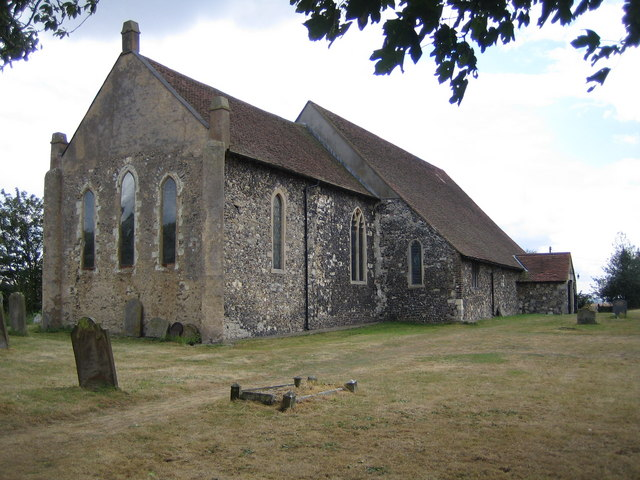
- St Catherine's Church, East Tilbury Village

- Location within Essex
- Population: 7,713 (Ward, 2021); 5,750 (Built up area, 2021)
- OS grid reference: TQ688768
- Unitary authority: Thurrock
- Ceremonial county: Essex
- Region: East
- Country: England
- Sovereign state: United Kingdom
- Post town: TILBURY
- Postcode district: RM18
- Dialling code: 01375
- Police: Essex
- Fire: Essex
- Ambulance: East of England
- UK Parliament: South Basildon and East Thurrock

East Tilbury is a community in the borough of Thurrock in Essex, England. The community is in two main parts, being the older village near the banks of the River Thames, and a garden village to the north which was initially called Bataville, founded in the 1930s to serve the Bata shoe factory.

East Tilbury was an ancient parish. It was abolished as a civil parish in 1936 on the creation of Thurrock Urban District, which in turn became the modern borough of Thurrock in 1974. The ecclesiastical parish has also been abolished, and the area now forms part of a Church of England ecclesiastical parish called "East and West Tilbury and Linford". East Tilbury gives its name to one of the wards of Thurrock, which covers a larger area than the old parish of East Tilbury, additionally including the separate villages of West Tilbury and Linford. At the 2021 census the ward had a population of 7,713 and the East Tilbury built up area as defined by the Office for National Statistics (which just covers the garden village part of East Tilbury) had a population of 5,750.

There is evidence of Romano-British settlement in what is now East Tilbury as far back as the 1st and 2nd centuries. The first written record of the settlement was likely in the Anglo-Saxon Chronicle of 653. During the Anglo-Saxon period, it likely formed a single manorial estate of Tilbury, which subsequently fragmented into East Tilbury and West Tilbury. Coalhouse Fort on the banks of the Thames was constructed in the 1860s. From the 1930s to 1960s, the area experienced significant growth with the opening of the Bata shoe factory and the construction of Bataville to house its thousands of workers.

== Etymology ==
It is believed that East Tilbury may have first been recorded in 653, when Saint Cedd is recorded in the Anglo-Saxon Chronicle as having founded and built a minister church at Tilaburg, later rendered as Tiliberia in the Domesday Book of 1086 and now Tilbury in the present day, a name it shares today with the separate settlements of West Tilbury and Tilbury Town. It is generally agreed that Cedd's original Tilbury referred to the village of East Tilbury in particular, though it has also been theorised that it may instead refer to a location in what is now West Tilbury or Tilbury Town.

Historically, East Tilbury was known as Great Tilbury to contrast it with West Tilbury, which was then known as Little Tilbury. This name is believed to have signified the seniority of East Tilbury during the Medieval period as the likely home of Cedd's original church. Today, the historic village of East Tilbury is known as East Tilbury Village to distinguish it from the newer Bataville estate built between the 1930s and 1960s, which forms the northern part of the modern community of East Tilbury.

The name Tilbury can be translated as "Tila's fort", with burgh meaning "fort" or "castle" in Anglo-Saxon Old English and Tila often understood to mean the name Tila. It has alternatively been theorised that tila in Tilaburg could derive from the Old Germanic word til and adjective tila, which mean "lowland" and "good" or "suitable" respectively, and burgh from the Old Germanic suffix burgus, meaning "a place to live in a new land", in a similar manner to Tilburg in the Netherlands. Much of the area around the three communities is on low-lying marshland.

== History ==
=== Early settlement ===
There is evidence of Romano-British settlement in what is now East Tilbury, with three hut circles dating to the 1st and 2nd centuries discovered on the East Tilbury foreshore in 1920. Remnants of a prehistoric track from Hangman's Wood in Grays to the parish church and river bank of East Tilbury suggests the use of a ford river crossing over the River Thames with Higham on the Hoo in Kent from the prehistoric period until c. 2,000 BC, when the Thames was much lower and narrower than it is today due to lower sea levels. This crossing may have seen later use during the Roman conquest of Britain by Claudius, with the Roman historian Cassius Dio suggesting that the Britons forded the river here to flee the advancing forces of Aulus Plautius. Roman tesserae was discovered during digging works near the parish church at East Tilbury in the 18th century, suggesting that a Roman era building or villa once stood on the site. It has been posited that the road that runs down East Tilbury is most likely Roman in origin.

The first written record of East Tilbury may have been in the Anglo-Saxon Chronicle of 653, when Saint Cedd was recorded as having founded and built a minister church at Tilaburg to promote his missionary work on the Pagan population, which was later corroborated by Saint Bede in his Ecclesiastical History of the English People in 731. The exact location of Cedd's church is not known, but it is believed to have been on the same site as the current East Tilbury parish church of St Catherine's which was then surrounded by tidal marshland, or alternatively further towards the East Tilbury river front or in what is now the neighbouring settlements of West Tilbury or Tilbury Town. During the Anglo-Saxon period, East and West Tilbury likely formed a single manorial estate, with East Tilbury as the namesake village of Tilbury. It is hard to distinguish between the two settlements in early records such as the Domesday Book as both are listed as a single manor under Tilbury. However, there are clear subdivisions in the Domesday Book between smaller manors with different owners, including one manor which was under the possession of Aelfric the Priest and two other manors held by freemen, which had 16 households and a fishery between them.

Following the Norman Conquest, Tilbury was split between different lords of the manor, which at times included William de Warenne, 1st Earl of Surrey and Robert fitz Swein of Essex. By the 13th century, East Tilbury and West Tilbury formed two different distinct parishes under the names of Great Tilbury and Little Tilbury respectively, which may suggest that East Tilbury was the more senior of the two parishes as the most likely home to Cedd's original church. In the 12th century, St Catherine's, the Norman parish church of East Tilbury, was built. Cedd's original church, if located in East Tilbury, is believed to have survived until the 12th century, when its bricks were repurposed to build East Tilbury's Hospital of St Mary in 1213, which stood near what is now Coalhouse Fort and survived into the late Middle Ages as a free chapel or chantry as St Margaret's Chapel until it was dissolved in 1536 and repurposed into East Tilbury Blockhouse, which was later reclaimed by the rising tides of the River Thames around 1735.

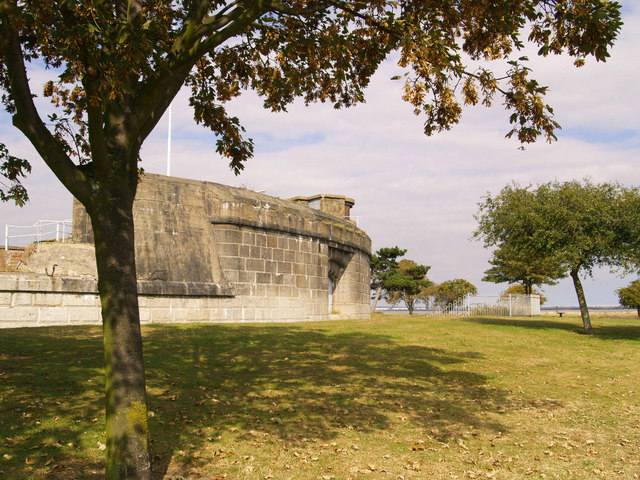
Coalhouse Fort in East Tilbury was built in the 1860s and remained an active part of the defences of London up to and including World War II

For much of the Middle Ages, East Tilbury regularly fell victim to foreign raids along the River Thames because of a lack of suitable defensive fortifications. In 1379, East Tilbury was one of several Thameside settlements that was raided by the French during the second phase of the Hundred Years' War. The attack prompted the building of Cooling Castle on Kent's Hoo Peninsula between 1380 and 1385 but there was initially no corresponding move to improve the defences of East Tilbury until 1402, when villagers successfully appealed to the Crown to build an earthly rampart and towers to protect the settlement. This was later followed by the Blockhouse and further fortifications in the 17th and 18th centuries, which culminated with the construction of Coalhouse Fort on the river front near the parish church in the 1860s amidst rising tensions with France. Coalhouse Fort was an active part of the defences of London up to and including World War II, having been refortified with new armaments as threats changed over the years.

=== Present day ===
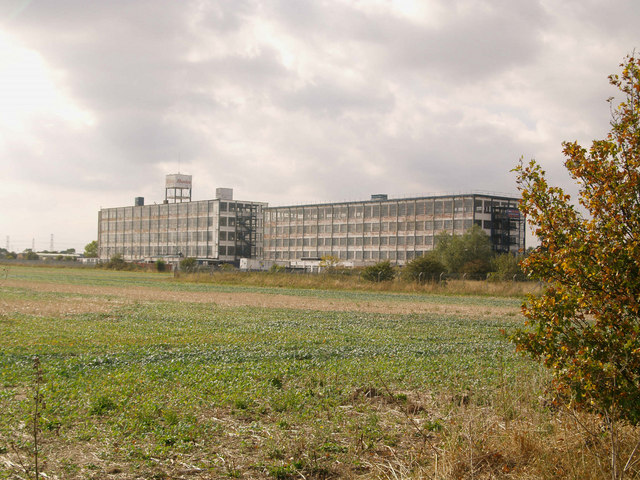
The Bata Factory by John Winfield

The construction of a Bata Shoes factory in the 1930s resulted in substantial development in East Tilbury. East Tilbury railway station opened in 1936 to serve the growing settlement around the factory. The factory has since closed down.

The Bata company developed not only a factory, but also a village for workers, built in the modernist style, and a sizeable estate of listed buildings remains. A sizeable Czech workforce was relocated here, and has merged into the local community after connections were lost with Czechoslovakia after World War II. The father of arts administrator John Tusa, also called John (Jan), was managing director of the factory in the late 30s.

=== Administrative history ===
East Tilbury was an ancient parish in the Barstable Hundred of Essex. When elected parish and district councils were established in 1894, East Tilbury was included in the Orsett Rural District. The civil parish and the rural district were both abolished in 1936 when the area became part of the new Thurrock Urban District. At the 1931 census (the last before the abolition of the civil parish), East Tilbury had a population of 353.

The parish of East Tilbury has also been abolished for ecclesiastical purposes, and the area now forms part of a Church of England ecclesiastical parish called "East and West Tilbury and Linford", with St Catherine's Church at East Tilbury serving as the parish church.

== Education ==
East Tilbury is served by modern infants and junior schools sharing a site opposite the old Bata factory and adjacent to parkland. The junior school recently acquired foundation status.

== Politics ==
East Tilbury ward consists the areas of East Tilbury, East Tilbury Village, Linford and West Tilbury. East Tilbury ward has two Thurrock Councillors, Councillor Sue Sammons elected 2016 (Independent) and Councillor Fraser Massey elected 2019 (Independent).

== Communications and facilities ==
The town is served by East Tilbury railway station on the Tilbury branch of the c2c service from London Fenchurch Street to Southend Central via Ockendon. East Tilbury is also served by the Nibs Buses route 374 which operates between Grays bus station and Basildon on Mondays to Saturdays.

It is located about 2 miles south of the A13 road from London to Southend.

East Tilbury does not have a developed shopping centre; its nearest major retail centres are located at Basildon and Lakeside.

== Developments ==
The area forms part of the Thames Gateway redevelopment zone and responsibility for delivery in this area is with the Thurrock Development Corporation. Large sections of Metropolitan Green Belt land have been earmarked for development; it is expected to include 14,000 homes and provide 20,000 jobs. East Tilbury is one of seven conservation areas in Thurrock.

On the northern end of the town is a small park called 'Gobions Park'. This got a development grant in 2009 of £50,000. The name may have come from Sir Richard Gobion from UpHavering.

From the late 1950s Esso Petroleum made tentative plans to build an oil refinery on East Tilbury marshes. In 1956 Tilbury Contracting & Dredging sold land that they owned in East Tilbury to Esso Petroleum for about £250,000. The land is marked on an undated map made by the Ministry of Power which also identifies the Occidental Refineries Limited and the United Refineries Limited sites on Canvey Island, which dates the map to about 1971. The land at East Tilbury is marked as 'land suggested for examination as oil refining site'. The 'Esso' land extends southwest from Low Street level crossing (TQ669776) to the river Thames (TQ663754) east of Tilbury power station then along the river past Coalhouse Fort to just north of Coalhouse Battery (TQ691776) then west to Low Street. The project is likely to have been abandoned as a consequence of the 1973 oil crisis and the resulting slump in oil and petroleum consumption.
