= Roberts baronets of Glassenbury and Britfieldstown (1809) =

Escutcheon of the Roberts baronets of Glassenbury and Britfieldstown

The Roberts baronetcy, of Britfieldstown (a townland, Baile an Bhritbhíligh) in the County of Cork and of the City of Cork, was created in the Baronetage of the United Kingdom on 20 September 1809 for Thomas Roberts, son of Randal Roberts of Britfieldstown.

== Roberts baronets, of Glassenbury and Britfieldstown (1809) ==
- Sir Thomas Roberts, 1st Baronet (1738–1814)
- Sir Walter Roberts, 2nd Baronet (1770–1828)
- Sir Thomas Howland Roberts, 3rd Baronet (1804–1864)
- Sir Randal Howland Roberts, 4th Baronet (1837–1899), army officer and author
- Sir Howland Roberts, 5th Baronet (1845–1917)
- Sir Thomas Langdon Howland Roberts, 6th Baronet (1898–1979)
- Sir Gilbert Howland Rookehurst Roberts, 7th Baronet (born 1934)

The heir apparent is the present holder's only son Howland Langdon Roberts (born 1961).

== Claim to 1620 title ==
Holders have a well documented and long established claim to the Glassenbury title, of the Roberts baronetcy of 1620.

Jane Roberts (1731-1778), only daughter of Sir Walter Roberts, 6th Baronet (1620), married in 1752 George Beauclerk, 3rd Duke of St Albans. She died in 1778 leaving in her will Glassenbury, a medieval mansion in Kent, to her cousins, the Roberts family of Britfieldstown, nr. Roberts' Cove, co. Cork, they being descendants of the Revd. Thomas Roberts (1590-1664), second son of Sir Thomas Roberts (1561-1627), 1st Bt. (1620). In about 1830, upon his coming of age, Thomas Walton Roberts (1809-1882), second surviving son of Sir Thomas Roberts, 8th Bt. (1620) and 1st Bt, (1809) of Britfieldstown moved to Glassenbury, and took in hand the house and estate. Upon Thomas Walton Roberts death in 1882 Glassenbury passed to his nephew John Roberts Atkin {thereafter Atkin-Roberts} (1843-1913), and there the family remained until c.1976,.

The baronetcy of 1620 is claimed by the 7th Baronet of the 1809 creation.

== Notes ==
Baronetage of the United Kingdom
Preceded by George baronets	Roberts baronets of Glassenbury and Britfieldstow; 20 September 1809	Succeeded by Shaw baronets
