= Tilbury and Chadwell St Mary Excellence Cluster =

Tilbury and Chadwell St Mary Excellence Cluster was a cooperative group of schools brought together under the government's Excellence in Cities initiative. The purpose of the cluster was to raise standards of attainment for all children in cluster schools and to support the new Gateway school. The original schools were Chadwell St Mary Primary School, Corringham Primary School, Grays Convent, Hassenbrook School, Herringham Primary School, Jack Lobley Primary School, Landsdowne Primary School, St Chad's Comprehensive School, Torrell's Comprehensive School, Tilbury Manor Infant School, Tilbury Manor Junior School, Tilbury St Mary's RC Primary School and Woodside Primary School. Schools outside of Chadwell St Mary or Tilbury were included either to add capacity or because a large number of their children came from the area. Jack Lobley school was closed in 2003 but the building was used for a while to house a cluster Inclusion Centre. St Chad's and Torrell's were also closed and reopened as one fresh start school; The Gateway Community College, which has since become The Gateway Academy but continues to have problems. Standards and attendance are still significantly below average. Excellence Clusters were originally given additional funding to development provisions over a four "strands": learning mentors, learning support units, gifted and talented and a tailored strand decided by each cluster which is in this case is school improvement.

== Learning Mentors ==
Each cluster school had one or more learning mentors whose task was to overcome barriers to learning among children in the school. As well as working with individuals this has included proactive work to remove bullying and improve attendance.

== Learning Support Units ==
The Gateway Academy had a unit within the school but there is a Learning Support Unit for the Primary Schools at Rainbow House on The Landsdowne site.

== Gifted and Talented ==
Each school has a gifted and talented coordinator supported by the cluster who maintains a register of the gifted and talented children in their own school, tracking progress and promoting good practice in challenging the more able. The cluster also arranges special events such as the Royal Philharmonic Orchestra workshops for specifically talented children. Each cluster school has worked with a creative designer to establish a Link Gallery.

== School Improvement ==
This strand has focussed on developing the quality of teaching and learning throughout cluster schools with high quality professional development for staff and cluster wide monitoring and reporting.

A number of the former Excellence Cluster Schools are now involved in Thurrock Excellence Trust. The main work of this collaboration is to establish "turnaround centres" in different parts of the borough. These are used to house children already excluded from school or in danger of exclusion. The main user is The Gateway Academy itself but all Thurrock Schools are able to buy into this service.
