= Roberts baronets of Glassenbury (1620) =

Escutcheon of the Roberts baronets of Glassenbury

The Roberts baronetcy, of Glassenbury, Cranbrook, in the County of Kent, was created in the Baronetage of England on 3 July 1620 for Thomas Roberts, High Sheriff of Kent in 1621.

The 4th Baronet represented Kent and Maidstone in the House of Commons.

== Roberts baronets, of Glassenbury (1620) ==
- Sir Thomas Roberts, 1st Baronet (c. 1561–1627)
- Sir Walter Roberts, 2nd Baronet (c. 1655)
- Sir Howland Roberts, 3rd Baronet (c. 1634–1661)
- Sir Thomas Roberts, 4th Baronet (1658–1706)
- Sir Thomas Roberts, 5th Baronet (1689–1730)
- Sir Walter Roberts, 6th Baronet (1691–1745). The title was incorrectly recorded as being extinct upon his death;. see the Roberts baronetcy of 1809.
