= Stork (margarine) =

Brand of margarine

Stork is a brand of margarine spread manufactured primarily from palm oil and water, owned by Flora Food Group, except in southern Africa, where it is owned by the Remgro subsidiary Siqalo Foods.

When it was introduced into the United Kingdom and Ireland from 1920, housewives were initially suspicious of the health effects and cooking ability of margarine. As a result, it required a large amount of advertising in the 1930s to increase usage, supported by the Stork sponsored Radio Lyons featuring the band of Carroll Gibbons.

Stork has been manufactured at the Purfleet works (originally Van den Berghs & Jurgens) in the UK since 1920.

It was with the onset of World War II and rationing of butter that sales began to rise, in part driven by the Stork Cookery Service. During the war, a lorry carrying Stork margarine overturned on the A531 road in Madeley, Staffordshire, resulting in people coming to try to salvage its load. The location became known as Margarine Corner.

Stork was launched in South Africa in 1950. After rationing ended in the UK in 1954, the brand was relaunched, supported by the "Art of Home Cooking" promotion, with the first Stork television adverts being shown in 1955. Stork soft was introduced in the 1970s, with entertainers Bruce Forsyth and later Leslie Crowther, fronting taste test-based television adverts.
