= Stanford-le-Hope =

Town in Essex, England

Coordinates: 51.5140°N 0.4244°E

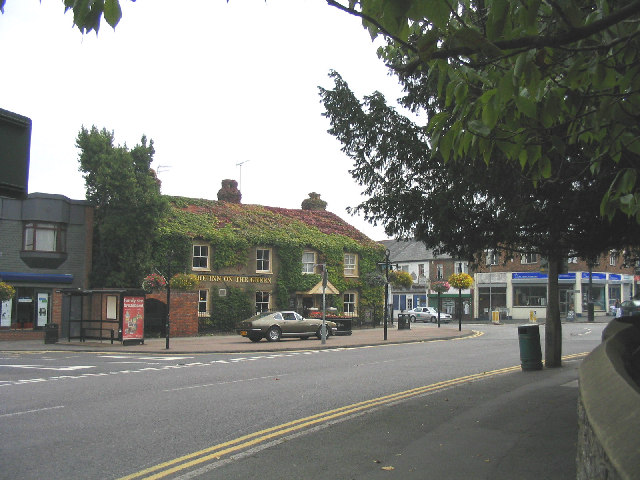
- The Inn on the Green

- Location within Essex
- Population: 29,525 (Built-up area, 2021)
- OS grid reference: TQ683822
- Unitary authority: Thurrock
- Ceremonial county: Essex
- Region: East
- Country: England
- Sovereign state: United Kingdom
- Post town: STANFORD-LE-HOPE
- Postcode district: SS17
- Dialling code: 01375
- Police: Essex
- Fire: Essex
- Ambulance: East of England
- UK Parliament: South Basildon and East Thurrock

Stanford-le-Hope is a town in the borough of Thurrock, in Essex, England. Often known locally simply as Stanford, the town is located 24 miles (39 km) east of Charing Cross, in central London. At the 2021 census, the Stanford-le-Hope built-up area had a population of 29,525, as defined by the Office for National Statistics, which includes Corringham.

Stanford-le-Hope was an ancient parish. It was abolished as a civil parish in 1936, on the creation of Thurrock Urban District, which in turn became the modern borough of Thurrock in 1974. The ecclesiastical parish has been merged with neighbouring Mucking to form a Church of England parish called Stanford-le-Hope with Mucking.

== History ==
Stanford-le-Hope was an ancient parish in the Barstable Hundred of Essex. When elected, parish and district councils were established in 1894, it was included in the Orsett Rural District. The civil parish and the rural district were abolished in 1936, on the creation of Thurrock Urban District. At the 1931 census, the last before its abolition, the civil parish of Stanford-le-Hope had a population of 4,311.

Early modernist author Joseph Conrad lived in Stanford-le-Hope from 1896 to 1898.

== Geography ==
The town is bordered to the north by the A13 road and to the south by the Thames Estuary. It is located 12.5 miles (20.1 km) west of Southend-on-Sea. The town centre has a village feel with the 800-year-old church, St Margaret's, making a prominent and attractive landmark around which shops, pubs and restaurants have grown around to create a lively core to the town.

As Stanford-le-Hope grew in size, it incorporated neighbouring settlements such as Corringham, Mucking and Fobbing; the latter of which was the scene of one of the uprisings which led to the Peasants' Revolt.

Unlike some other areas of Thurrock, Stanford-le-Hope is surrounded by countryside and farmland.

The river Hope, a tributary of the Thames, runs through the town. The town's name is derived from Norman settlements and refers to Stanna's Ford over the Hope.

Locally, there are a number of parks and nature reserves, notably Thurrock Thameside Nature Reserve, with a visitor centre providing views up and down the Thames across both industrial and natural landscapes; these include the Mucking Flats and Marshes Site of Special Scientific Interest.

In 2014, a group of residents led a restoration project which raised funds to finance a restoration of the war memorial, as part of the commemoration of World War I.

=== Climate ===
Climate data for Stanford-le-Hope (1991–2020)
| Month | Jan | Feb | Mar | Apr | May | Jun | Jul | Aug | Sep | Oct | Nov | Dec | Year |
|---|---|---|---|---|---|---|---|---|---|---|---|---|---|
| Record high °C (°F) | 14.0 (57.2) | 14.5 (58.1) | 19.0 (66.2) | 20.5 (68.9) | 26.5 (79.7) | 31.0 (87.8) | 30.5 (86.9) | 29.0 (84.2) | 25.5 (77.9) | 22.5 (72.5) | 17.5 (63.5) | 15.5 (59.9) | 31.0 (87.8) |
| Mean daily maximum °C (°F) | 8.2 (46.8) | 8.7 (47.7) | 11.2 (52.2) | 13.9 (57.0) | 17.3 (63.1) | 20.4 (68.7) | 22.2 (72.0) | 22.3 (72.1) | 19.7 (67.5) | 15.4 (59.7) | 11.2 (52.2) | 8.7 (47.7) | 15.0 (59.0) |
| Daily mean °C (°F) | 5.4 (41.7) | 5.4 (41.7) | 7.3 (45.1) | 9.5 (49.1) | 12.6 (54.7) | 15.6 (60.1) | 17.7 (63.9) | 17.5 (63.5) | 15.0 (59.0) | 11.5 (52.7) | 7.9 (46.2) | 5.7 (42.3) | 11.0 (51.8) |
| Mean daily minimum °C (°F) | 2.5 (36.5) | 2.1 (35.8) | 3.4 (38.1) | 5.1 (41.2) | 7.8 (46.0) | 10.8 (51.4) | 13.3 (55.9) | 12.8 (55.0) | 10.4 (50.7) | 7.7 (45.9) | 4.6 (40.3) | 2.7 (36.9) | 7.0 (44.6) |
| Record low °C (°F) | −9.0 (15.8) | −7.0 (19.4) | −4.5 (23.9) | −3.0 (26.6) | −1.5 (29.3) | 3.5 (38.3) | 6.5 (43.7) | 5.5 (41.9) | 2.5 (36.5) | −1.0 (30.2) | −6.5 (20.3) | −10.0 (14.0) | −10.0 (14.0) |
| Average precipitation mm (inches) | 48.6 (1.91) | 40.0 (1.57) | 33.8 (1.33) | 38.9 (1.53) | 46.5 (1.83) | 43.8 (1.72) | 52.4 (2.06) | 46.5 (1.83) | 46.1 (1.81) | 63.0 (2.48) | 61.7 (2.43) | 55.8 (2.20) | 577.0 (22.72) |
| Average precipitation days (≥ 1.0 mm) | 10.1 | 8.3 | 8.7 | 8.7 | 8.9 | 8.9 | 8.0 | 7.6 | 8.1 | 10.8 | 10.2 | 10.3 | 108.6 |
| Mean monthly sunshine hours | 59.5 | 77.8 | 120.8 | 167.4 | 204.5 | 204.3 | 212.2 | 193.7 | 161.7 | 117.0 | 73.0 | 52.8 | 1,644.7 |
Source 1: Met Office (Note: Precipitation days 1981-2010.)
Source 2: Starlings Roost Weather

== Governance ==
The 2026 Thurrock Council elections saw Reform UK win most contested seats in East Thurrock, including the ward of Stanford-le-Hope South.

Stephen Metcalfe of the Conservatives represented the area in the South Basildon and East Thurrock constituency from 2010 until the 2024 UK general election. The current MP is James McMurdock, an Independent.

== Economy ==
Many residents work at the Lakeside Shopping Centre, and the industrial and commercial businesses along the north bank of the Thames that are sited westward towards the Port of London.

Until 1999, the town was home to two oil refineries located on the Thames: Shell Haven and Coryton. The Shell site ceased operating in 1999 and has since been redeveloped as the London Gateway deep water container port, with attendant logistics and commercial development.

== Transport ==
Stanford-le-Hope railway station lies on the London, Tilbury and Southend line. c2c operates regular services between London Fenchurch Street, Pitsea, Southend Central and Shoeburyness.

Bus routes are operated primarily by First Essex, which connect the town with Basildon, Corringham, Grays, Lakeside Shopping Centre and Orsett.

The A13 passes through the area, connecting east London with Southend.

== Media ==
Stanford-le-Hope lies within the BBC London and ITV London region. Television signals are received from Crystal Palace TV transmitter, BBC South East and ITV Meridian can also be received from the Bluebell Hill TV transmitter.

Local radio stations are BBC Essex on 95.3 FM, Heart East on 96.3 FM and Radio Essex on 105.1 FM.

The town is served by two local newspapers: the Thurrock Gazette and the Evening Echo.
