= Orsett Heath =

Village in Essex, England

Coordinates: 51.4936°N 0.3607°E

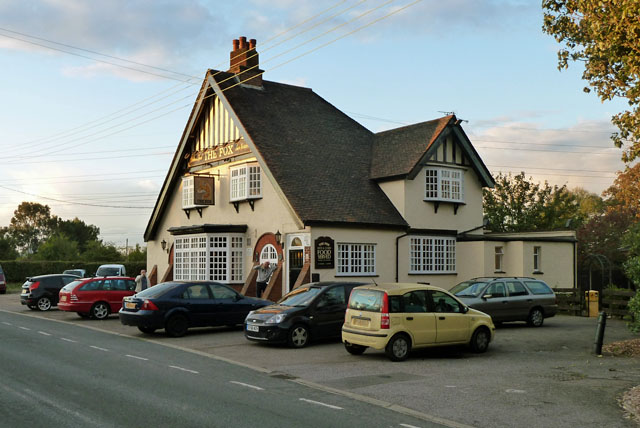
- The Fox, Orsett Heath's local restaurant

- Location within Essex
- OS grid reference: TQ63927987
- Unitary authority: Thurrock
- Ceremonial county: Essex
- Region: East
- Country: England
- Sovereign state: United Kingdom
- Postcode district: RM16
- Dialling code: 01375
- Police: Essex
- Fire: Essex
- Ambulance: East of England
- UK Parliament: Thurrock

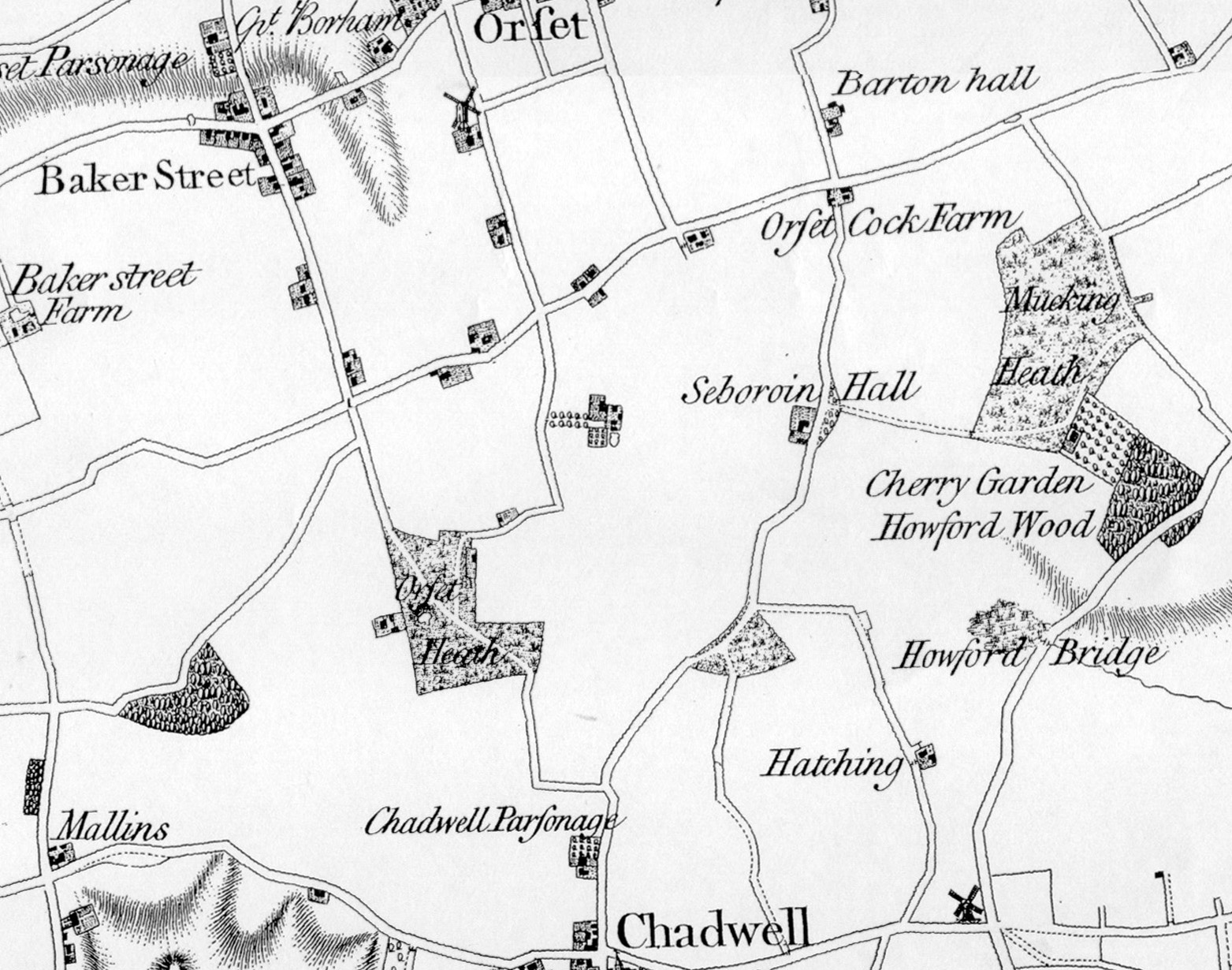
Part of plate XXII from the Chapman & Andre 1777 map of Essex showing the location of Orsett Heath

Orsett Heath is a village in the unitary authority area of Thurrock, in the ceremonial county of Essex, England. It is located about twenty miles away from London. Nearby settlements include the towns of Tilbury and Grays and the villages of Orsett and Chadwell St Mary. For transport there is the A13 road, the A1089 road and the A1013 road nearby. The nearest railway station is Tilbury Town.

At one time, Orsett Heath was probably part of a large swathe of heathland interspaced with woodland. This included Biggin Heath (heathland belonging to the manor of Biggin), Chadwell Heath (heathland belonging to the manor of Chadwell St Mary, not the place near Romford), Mucking Heath, Socketts Heath and Terrel's Heath all of which were on high ground compared to the nearby marsh and had poor sandy soil with underlying gravel and chalk.

== Education ==
The Orsett Heath is home to the Willow Garden Day Nursery which boasts an Ofsted rating of Outstanding. It is next to the Treetops School which serves children with special needs. It also lends its name to the nearby Orsett Heath Academy. Other schools nearby include Woodside Academy, The Gateway Academy and William Edwards School. Gateway and William Edwards are both just over a mile away.
