= St Giles' and All Saints' Church, Orsett =

Church in Essex, England

St Giles & All Saints Church
- Orsett Church
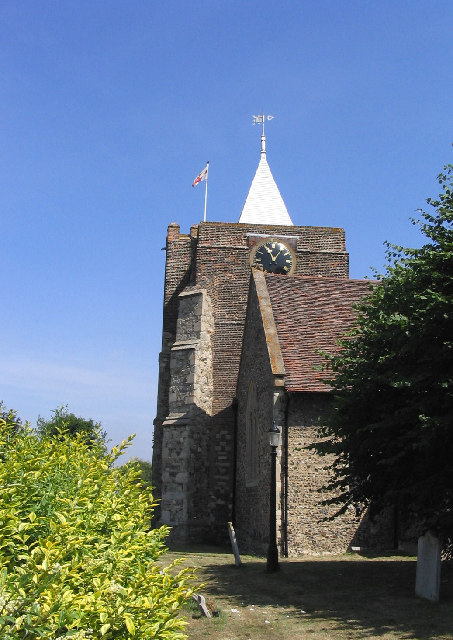
- St Giles & All Saints Church
- 51°30′46″N 0°22′06″E
- Country: England
- Denomination: Church of England
- Website: www.hobnob.org.uk/places/orsett/

History
- Status: Active

Architecture
- Heritage designation: Grade I
- Architect(s): Sir Charles Nicholson & Edward Fincham (following fire)

Administration
- Diocese: Diocese of Chelmsford
- Benefice: United Benefice of Orsett, Bulphan and Horndon-on-the-Hill

Clergy
- Rector: Vacant

St Giles & All Saints Church is a Church of England parish church in Orsett, Essex, England, which is of medieval origin. It is a Grade I listed building.

== History ==
The walls are of flint and ragstone-rubble with some Barnack and pudding-stone; the North West tower is mainly of brick. The dressings are of Reigate and other limestone; the roofs are tiled and the spire weather-boarded. The nave is of mid 12th-century date and incorporates the original 12th-century chancel. A North aisle of three bays was added c. 1230, and about the same time a North chapel was added to the 12th-century chancel, which may then have been lengthened. A connecting bay was inserted between the nave arcade and the 13th-century arch to the north of the original chancel. At the same time, the 13th-century chapel was abolished, and the entire North aisle was rebuilt and widened. The present chancel was built beyond the former chancel, which was then thrown into the nave. In the 15th century the North-West tower was added, encroaching on the aisle, the West wall of the nave was re-built and the South porch added. About 1500, the North chapel was added. In 1610, much of the tower was re-built, and extensive repairs or additions to it were made in 1674. The organ chamber, South transept and North vestry are modern, and the South porch has been mostly re-built.

The church suffered from a fire in July 1926 which required a major restoration of the roofs. The church was redesigned by Sir Charles Nicholson and Edward Fincham. The roofs were being re-built at the time of the fire.

The badly eroded sandstone cross in the graveyard was erected by the Whitmore family of Orsett Hall. An elaborate tomb is also erected here for Captain Bonham, a slave trader and the original owner of Orsett House.

The church features three scratch sundials under the archway at the entrance. They are thought to date from the church's construction.

== Parish ==
Today the parish is part of the united benefice of Orsett and Bulphan and Horndon on the Hill.
