= Terrel's Heath =

Woodland in Essex, England

Coordinates: 51.49°N 00.36°E

- Location within Essex
- OS grid reference: TQ6381
- Unitary authority: Thurrock
- Shire county: Essex
- Region: East
- Country: England
- Sovereign state: United Kingdom
- Police: Essex
- Fire: Essex
- Ambulance: East of England
- UK Parliament: Thurrock

Terrel's Heath is, in spite of its name, an area of woodland in Chadwell St Mary named on the 1938 six-inch Ordnance Survey map.

== Location and description ==
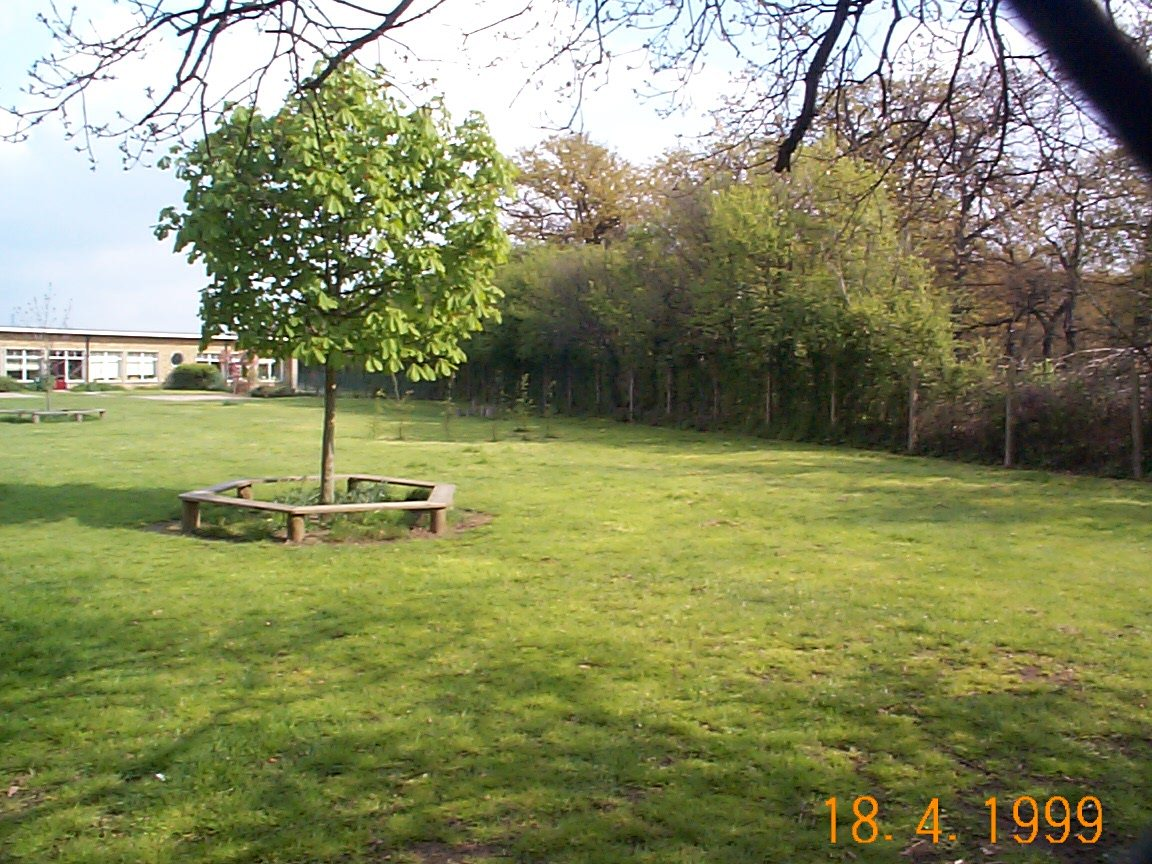
An ancient bank and ditch separates Woodside school (on the left) from Terrel's Heath (on the right).

Terrel's Heath is adjacent to Woodside Primary School in Little Thurrock. Separating Terrel's Heath from Woodside School is an ancient bank and ditch that marks the boundary between the traditional parishes of Chadwell St Mary and Little Thurrock. It can be accessed only from the bridle path which runs from Chadwell St Mary, across nearby Orsett Heath to Hangman's Wood, part of the ancient route from Coalhouse Point in East Tilbury to the bridge or causeway at Aveley. It is deciduous woodland, almost entirely oak with bluebells in the spring, often an indicator of ancient (unplanted) woodland.

== Name ==
The name Terrel's heath dates back to at least the mid 17th century when it was recorded (as Tirells Heath) on an estate map. The place-name element "Terrel's" may relates to either the Tyrrel family of Essex or the Torel family. The element "Heath" may relate either to a time when it was not wooded or to include the surrounding area which was until comparatively recently typical heathland. The Tyrell's family were sponsors of All Saints Church, East Horndon where many family members are buried. It was the family name which was adopted as the original name both the junior and infant schools which later became Woodside Primary School, Grays while the adjacent Secondary School was known as "Torells". The young 19th Century diarist Martha Randall wrote "Tirrels heath" when describing a November walk on the Heath which was close to her home at Heath Place Farm.

== History ==
Terrel's Heath was given to Thurrock Council by the Baker family of Orsett Hall and is now a public open space. It was considerably reduced in size by the construction of the Dock Relief Road which connects the Port of Tilbury with the A13. This road now separates Terrel's Heath from the larger Orsett Heath. Before the road and before the nearby housing estates were there Terrel's Heath would have been part of a large swathe of heathland interspaced with woodland. This included Biggin Heath (heathland belonging to the manor of Biggin), Chadwell Heath (heathland belonging to the manor of Chadwell St Mary, not the place near Romford), Mucking Heath, Orsett Heath, Socketts Heath and Terrel's Heath all of which were on high ground compared to the nearby marsh and had poor sandy soil with underlying gravel and chalk. Heathland is maintained by animal grazing which prevents the growth of trees or large bushes. If the land ceases to be used for grazing, it reverts to woodland. Terrel's Heath was apparently still being grazed in 1840 when Champion Branfill wrote to William Wigfield on the subject of “rights of pasturage on Tyrrells heath”.
