= William Edwards School =

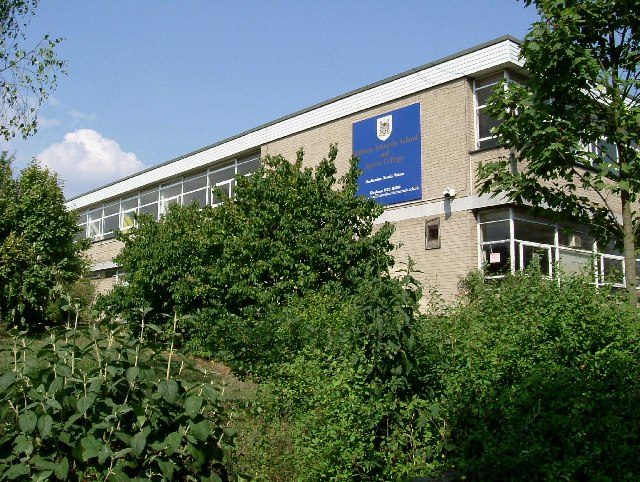

Location
- Stifford Clays Road; Stifford Clays; Grays, Essex, RM16 3NJ; England; 51.50357°N 0.33288°E

Information
- Other names: WES, Willy Eds, William Eds
- Type: Academy
- Motto: "Inspirational Learning With A Strong Sporting Ethos"
- Established: 11 September 1962
- Local authority: Thurrock Council
- Specialist: Sports
- Department for Education URN: 137214 Tables
- Ofsted: Reports
- Chairman: John King OBE
- Headteacher: Lynne Sexton
- Deputy Head(s): Martin Ovenden; Amanda Wood; Henry Dunn
- Gender: Coeducational
- Age: 11 to 16
- Enrolment: 1259
- Houses: Turing; Nightingale; Ennis-Hill; Parks; Attenborough
- Colours: Blue and yellow
- Eponym: William H. Edwards
- Website: https://williamedwards.org.uk

William Edwards School (formerly William Edwards School and Sports College), commonly referred to by locals and students as Willy Eds, is a coeducational secondary comprehensive school with academy status, in Grays, Essex, England. It is a founding member of the South West Essex Community Education Trust (SWECET) and is its leading member. The current headteacher of the school is Mrs Lynne Sexton The school first opened on 11 September 1962, gaining specialist sports college status in 2002 and in 2004 also became a training school. The school achieved outstanding in its Ofsted inspection of December 2010 after which it closed to make way for the current academy status school, reopening on 1 August 2011. In March 2017 the school was inspected and retained outstanding status. As of 2019 it requires improvement.

The school claims to offer a wide range of GCSE options for students and to have adequate resources to support the students' learning. It has also retained specialist sports college status and claims to offer a "strong approach to the arts." The 2012-2013 academic year marked the 50th anniversary of the school’s opening and it had been serving the local community for 55 years. During this time, the school had achieved Platinum Artsmark status and received many sporting awards.

== History ==
=== Construction and opening ===
In May 1946 work on building an estate began in Stifford Clays. To be included within the estate was a primary and secondary school and the site where the secondary was to be built was known as Little Graven Field, a poppy-covered meadow with rumoured archaeological interest. The name "Little Graven Field" is said to derive from a settlement site that was torched 2000 years ago at its location. In 1959 cropmarks on Little Graven Field were discovered through satellite imagery, expanding archaeological interest and suggesting previous occupation. Emergency excavations were carried out and Romano-British remains were found.

The school was completed in 1962 and was ready to be opened by the beginning of the 1962-1963 academic year. The school opened on 11 September and was named after William H. Edwards, a man of lifelong local government and education within Thurrock. An influx of 262 Year 7 and 8 students enrolled in the school's first two days. The first headteacher was Reg H. Saxton who served until he died in 1967 and the deputy head was Ms. Leonard.

=== 1967-2006 ===
In 1967 Saxton died and was replaced by Wilfred Larwood as head. The headteacher in the 1990s, until Brenda Watson took over in 1999, was Royston van Tromp. During this period the school motto may have been "Strength In Knowledge" as reflected in the old school coat of arms.

In 2002 Ofsted judged the school to be 'good'.In the same year the school specialised and became a sports college. With this specialisation it gained the right to admit 10% of its pupil admission intake according to sport aptitude, a right it still holds today despite becoming an academy. It also became a training school in 2004.

=== 2006-2011 ===
In 2006 William Edwards Headteacher Brenda Watson announced her resignation after leading the school since 1999. John King, later OBE, became head. King remained headteacher at Corringham's Gable Hall School, a position he held since 1993. This meant that he would lead over 2300 students, around a quarter of Thurrock's senior students. A year later Ofsted again judged William Edwards a good school.

In 2011 Ofsted deemed the school to be "an outstanding school. Outcomes for individuals and groups are outstanding and have improved steadily for the third consecutive year. Standards of attainment have been significantly above average during that time and variations in the performance of groups of students have been eliminated." The outstanding report placed the school in the top 10 per cent of secondaries in England and encouraged the school as having "the potential to be even more impressive in the future". In the same year headteacher John King retired from full-time education. King, one of the 17 top earning headteachers in the country, was succeeded as headteacher by Sophina Asong in Gable Hall and Steve Munday in William Edwards and has since been William Edwards' chairman. The school closed in 2011 to make way for a new academy status school under the leadership of Munday.

=== Academy ===
On 1 August 2011 William Edwards School reopened as a comprehensive secondary academy converter school. As the new school replaced one judged to be outstanding it was exempt from routine inspection. In 2017 the school was inspected for the first time and outstanding status was retained.

In 2014 the school was visited by Secretary of State for Education, Nicky Morgan. She stated that "This clearly is an outstanding school. What we see here is a real energy from the headteacher downwards to be outstanding. There's a real commitment to spread best practice."

==== SWECET and requires improvement status ====
In 2015 the school became a founding, and the leading member, of the South West Essex Community Education Trust (SWECET). In 2018 Headteacher Steve Munday resigned to become full time CEO of SWECET in July 2018, being replaced by head Mr. Simon Bell. Under Munday and Bell SWECET and William Edwards lead the creation of a brand new free school named Orsett Heath Academy. They applied to build the new school near the Orsett Heath in July 2016 and hoped to open the school by September 2019. Their plans were approved in April 2017 and the school was to be built on Gammon Field. The original plans included many sports facilities which could have facilitated Grays Athletic's return to the area from Aveley. The Orsett Heath Academy finally opened in September 2020 and Simon Bell of William Edwards became executive head whilst also retaining his current position as head at William Edwards. The school aims to replicate and build on the "outstanding education provision and ethos" of the William Edwards School.

In 2019 Ofsted made another inspection of the school. The inspectorate made a controversial decision to recategorize the school as "requires improvement", one rank above special measures status. The result allegedly shocked Thurrock residents as the school had been outstanding for nearly a decade. William Edwards, SWECET and Thurrock Council all opposed the judgement and the Thurrock Portfolio Holder for Education and Health James Halden refused to “recognise the overall judgement”, believing that “The overall inspection judgement is not one we recognise and we fully support the position taken by the school and Trust to try and secure re-inspection at the earliest opportunity possible."

An inspection has taken place in October 2023 and the outcome has yet to be published

==== House name controversy ====
Originally in 1962 there were 3 school houses each named after landowners and lords of the manor historic to the local area. They were Bruyn, Rokell and Warren and some years later a fourth house was added, named after the influential Whitmore family. The Whitmore family especially has historical ties to the local area due to its inheritance of the old Orsett Hall, which burned down in 2007.

In May 2021 William Edwards announced that the four house names would change as part of their response to the COVID-19 pandemic. In order to support pupils most affected by the pandemic the school planned to introduce a fifth house to increase its total capacity. The other houses were also relaunched with new names and brands. The five new houses were named Parks, Nightingale, Attenborough, Ennis-Hill, and Turing, all named in honour of their respective eponyms.

Pupils and staff have suggested names and have decided to move away from the traditional names we have used that have had a local connection. They have chosen role models, heroes and interesting figures from history that they want to celebrate and be associated with. For example, as a result of the magnificent work carried out by the NHS over the last year, pupils wanted to celebrate the role of nurses and have therefore chosen ‘Nightingale’ as the name for one of the new houses.

— Headteacher Simon Bell on the new houses

In response, former students who attended the school launched a petition calling on the school to reverse its decision. The new names were accused of being "woke" and the changes a "clear case of cancel culture" that had "infested" the school. Headteacher Bell responded to the controversy by stating that he could not "do anything about it if that decision is one which most former and current pupils do not agree with." The response was called dismissive and led to the spread of another petition hosted on Change.org.

== Governance ==
William Edwards School is run by a senior leadership team which is made up of assistant, deputy and senior headteachers. Pastorally one teacher is allocated to each house to act as its leader and there are also two faculty directors for sports and the humanities, department leaders, a local school advisory board and a student leadership. The student leadership participate in the school council.

The school is locally governed by the South West Essex Community Education Trust (SWECET).

== Extracurricular activities ==
William Edwards School offers its facilities for hire and also hosts events for the local community, such as the annual Thurrock Community Carnival which is held in partnership with the Royal Opera House. School events like shows and productions are also held. As of 2021 out-of-hours extracurricular activities consists of clubs that include PE both before and after school and also include after school art, science, dance, homework, drama, music, photography, English, geography, health and social care and Spanish. There is also the unique after school manga, anime and comic book club (no longer running). Besides PE there are also other physical clubs including netball, football, badminton, basketball, rugby and running. The school's fitness suite is also accessible on Mondays and Fridays.

== Campus ==
In 2009 the school opened the Stifford Auditorium with a cinema and lecture theatre. There is also a development centre, library, fitness suite and a gym. The school has its own car-park and the Grays railway station is nearby.

== Awards and recognition ==
The William Edwards School participates in the Duke of Edinburgh Awards and it claims to have "one of the largest DofE cohort of any school or organisation in the East of England." The school also nominates its students for the Jack Petchey Award. The school has also achieved Platinum Artsmark status and received many sporting awards. In 2011 the school was praised as one of the top 10% of secondaries in England by Ofsted and in 1997 it won the Queen Mother's Environmental Award.

=== Teaching awards ===
Former long-time Deputy Headteacher Ralph Henderson was on the Queen's 2008 New Years Honours list and became a Member of the Most Excellent Order of the British Empire for his services to education. Former Headteacher John King also holds an OBE since 2005 and is regarded as a "super-head", with the accolades of being one of the top 17 earning heads in the entire country and securing four outstanding Ofsted judgements for Gable Hall and one for William Edwards, having run both schools at the same time.

== Alumni ==
The William Edwards Alumni Community Association is an alumni association run by the school in partnership with Future First. It was established in 2019 and its current president is former long-time Deputy Headteacher Ralph Henderson MBE. The alumni association runs a monthly newsletter and assists with school events such as the school's yearly mock Interview day whilst also maintaining its own projects. It is governed by an "Alumni Board" consisting of alumni and former teachers.

The school's notable alumni include:

- Chris Cohen, professional footballer
- Max Porter, professional footballer
