= Baker Street, Essex =

Area of Orsett, Essex, England

Coordinates: 51.50°N 00.34°E

Baker Street
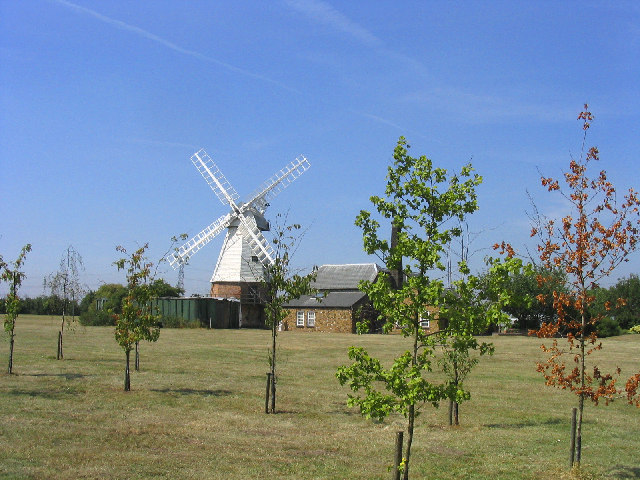
- Baker Street windmill

- Location within Essex
- Area: 0.330 km^{2} (0.127 sq mi)
- Population: 598 (2019 estimate)
  - Density: 1,812/km^{2} (4,690/sq mi)
- OS grid reference: TQ6381
- Unitary authority: Thurrock
- Ceremonial county: Essex
- Region: East
- Country: England
- Sovereign state: United Kingdom
- Post town: GRAYS
- Postcode district: RM16
- Dialling code: 01375
- Police: Essex
- Fire: Essex
- Ambulance: East of England
- UK Parliament: Thurrock

Baker Street is an area of Orsett in the unitary authority of Thurrock. It is in the ceremonial county of Essex, England. In 2019 it had an estimated population of 598.

== Description ==
Reaney suggests the name is derived from William Bakere de Luggestreet.

It is known locally because of the surviving windmill. The windmill is said to have been built in the 17th century and ceased working in 1911. It is now a private house.

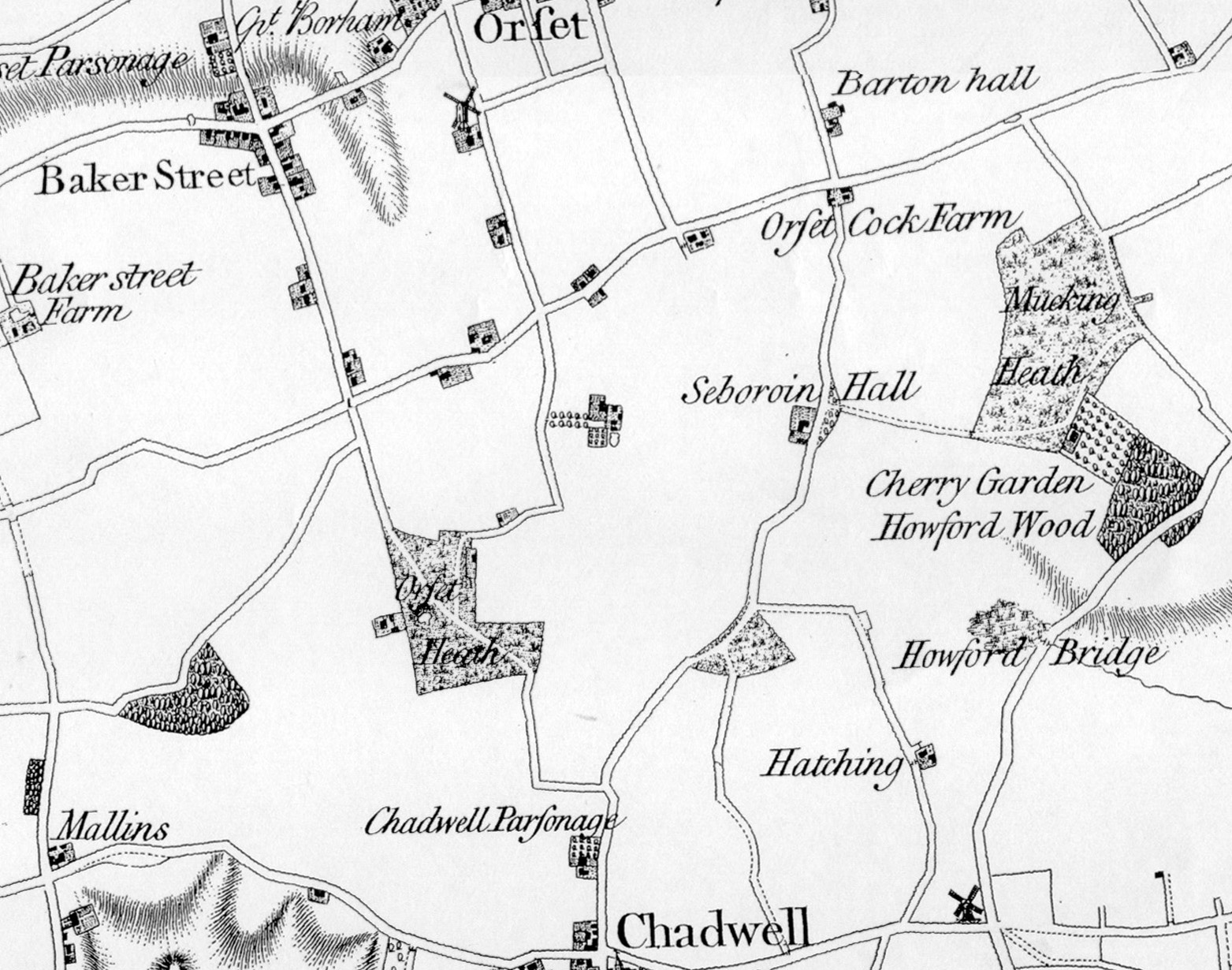
Baker Street as it appeared on the 1777 Chapman & Andre map of Essex
