= Chadwell St Mary =

Area in Essex, England

Coordinates: 51.481°N 0.370°E

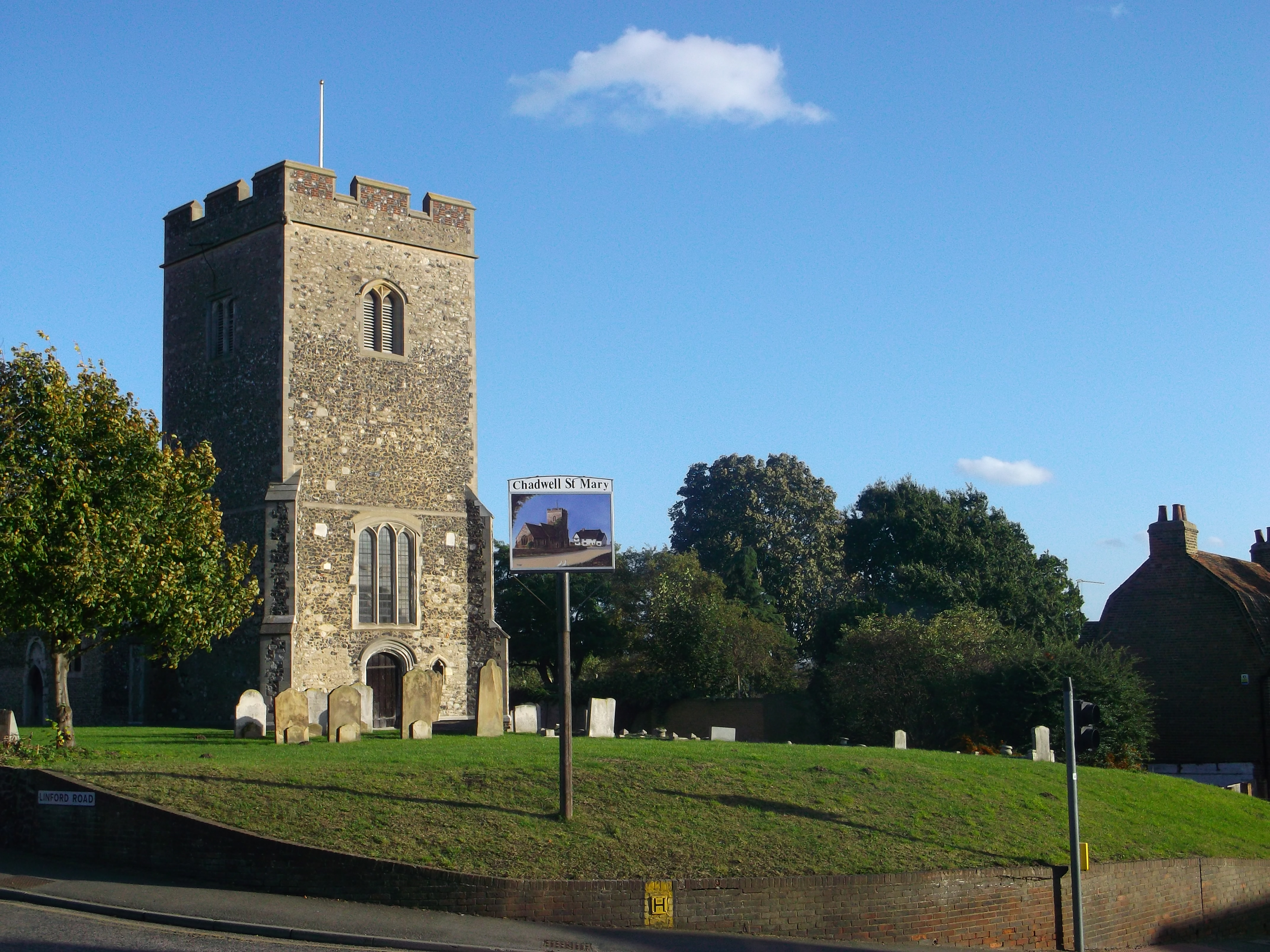
- St Mary's Church and village sign

- Location within Essex
- Population: 10,685 (Built up area, 2021)
- OS grid reference: TQ645785
- Unitary authority: Thurrock
- Ceremonial county: Essex
- Region: East
- Country: England
- Sovereign state: United Kingdom
- Post town: GRAYS
- Postcode district: RM16
- Dialling code: 01375
- Police: Essex
- Fire: Essex
- Ambulance: East of England
- UK Parliament: South Basildon and East Thurrock

Chadwell St Mary is an area of the unitary authority of Thurrock in Essex, England. It lies 2 miles (3 km) east of the centre of Grays, its post town, and 1 mile (1.6 km) north of Tilbury. At the 2021 census the Chadwell St Mary built up area as defined by the Office for National Statistics had a population of 10,685.

Chadwell St Mary, historically sometimes just called Chadwell, was an ancient parish. The parish included both Chadwell St Mary itself and the area to the south where the port town of Tilbury developed from the 19th century. In 1912, the parish became the Tilbury Urban District. That urban district and the civil parish of Chadwell St Mary were abolished in 1936 on the creation of the larger Thurrock Urban District, which in turn became the modern borough of Thurrock in 1974. Chadwell St Mary remains the name of one of Thurrock's Church of England parishes.

== Geology and topography ==
The southern part of the parish was historically a natural salt marsh adjacent to the River Thames, which is tidal and saline at this point. Decaying vegetation together with mud and silt from the river were deposited from the end of the most recent ice age until the marshes were reclaimed sometime before the 14th century. These sedimentary deposits reach a depth of 50 feet (15 m) or more and are interleaved with a number of peaty layers.

About 2 miles (3 km) north of the river, the land rises steeply to a ridge (extending from Grays to East Tilbury) about 100 feet (30 m) above sea level (AOD), on which most of the Chadwell's housing is built. This provides excellent views over the marshes and out to the Downs of Kent. This is one of the finest gravel beds in the country and has been extensively worked. The higher (and dryer) ground extends north for roughly another mile. The north west of Chadwell lies at the end of the chalk outcrop.

To the north of the built up area, is Old House Wood, a tree covered area, named on Ordnance Survey maps. It is an area of local nature conservancy importance (ALNC). The eastern and northern edges of the wood are part of the boundary between the traditional parishes of Chadwell and Orsett. This boundary is marked with a bank and ditch.

Despite its name, Terrel's Heath, on the western side of Chadwell, is an area of woodland. It is designated as a site of importance for nature conservation (SINC).

Biggin is a late medieval hamlet on the edge of the marshes that was part of the traditional parish and remains so ecclesiastically (in terms of Anglican church).

== History ==
Not much is known of occupation in Chadwell until the Saxon period of British history. Artefacts found (some of which are in the local museum in Grays) show that the area was inhabited in the Stone, Bronze and Iron Ages. Before the building of new housing in the 20th century, it was a dispersed settlement.

It is known that there was a sizeable non-military Roman settlement to the south of the road between Chadwell and West Tilbury. A Roman oven was found in this location in 1922 containing three complete pots, fragments of others and a small clay lamp, all of which were given to Colchester Museum. In the early Roman period, sea-levels dropped, making the marshes inhabitable and there may have been a Roman settlement on the site of what is now Tilbury Docks.

An archaeological investigation during the construction of new facilities for Chadwell Primary school discovered a complete site of a Saxon sunken floored hut (Grubenhaus) from the 6th century.

=== Toponymy ===
The place-name 'Chadwell' is first attested in the Domesday Book of 1086, where it appears as Celdewella. It is generally understood to mean 'cold spring'. The 'St Mary', referring to the parish church, was later added to distinguish this Chadwell from Chadwell Heath, near Romford.

An alternative theory for the origin of the name Chadwell is that it refers to a well where either Chad or his brother Cedd, both Christian missionaries in the 7th century, baptised their converts.

The purported site of "St Chad's Well" was recorded on the 1864 Ordnance Survey map near the southern (lower) end of Chadwell Hill, close to where the modern roundabout with Marshfoot Road now stands. Writing in 1871, William Palin, rector of nearby Stifford, said that the well was still visible then. Arthur Astbury, writing in 1980, suggested that the well (whether a "cold spring" or a baptismal site or both) may have been a Roman feature linked to an adjoining road. Historic England's modern records list the well as a medieval feature, and note that no trace of it was found on the ground in a survey in 1953.

=== Chadwell Church ===
The original Chadwell parish church was dedicated to the Virgin Mary and this is the source of the suffix "St Mary" in the modern name. It is a grade I listed building located at the crossroads overlooking the marshes. There was a church in Chadwell before the Norman conquest. The present church has a number of Norman features and probably dates to the 12th century. The tower was built in the early 16th century. The church contains an early memorial brass to Cicilye Owen (died 1603), the wife of Thomas Owen of London, who was a merchant tailor. The church has an extension on the south that was built at the beginning of the 20th century. There is now a second Anglican church in the parish – Emmanuel.

=== Manors ===
The Domesday Book records, that at the time of the survey, the Bishop of London and Odo, the Bishop of Bayeux held the two manors in this parish. Later the land was divided into four manors, Chadwell, Ingleby, Longhouse and Biggin (the last three names are kept in perpetuity by local road names). The location of Chadwell Hall, the manor house of the manor of Chadwell, is marked by flower beds on the western side of Chadwell Hill. The manor of Ingleby was bought by Peter Symonds in the 1580s and was bequeathed by him to found Christ's Hospital in Winchester.

=== Peter Symonds Charity ===
In addition to founding the school in Winchester, Peter Symonds left annual payments for a number of charitable purposes, including the poor of All Saint, Lombard Street and Chadwell in Essex. Payments to Chadwell from this charity seem to have stopped around 1740, but in 1794, the rev William Herringham, rector of Chadwell, succeeded in obtaining £52 in arrears. Herringham and other local landowners increased the available funds which were then used to give clothing and coal to the poor.

=== Buildings ===
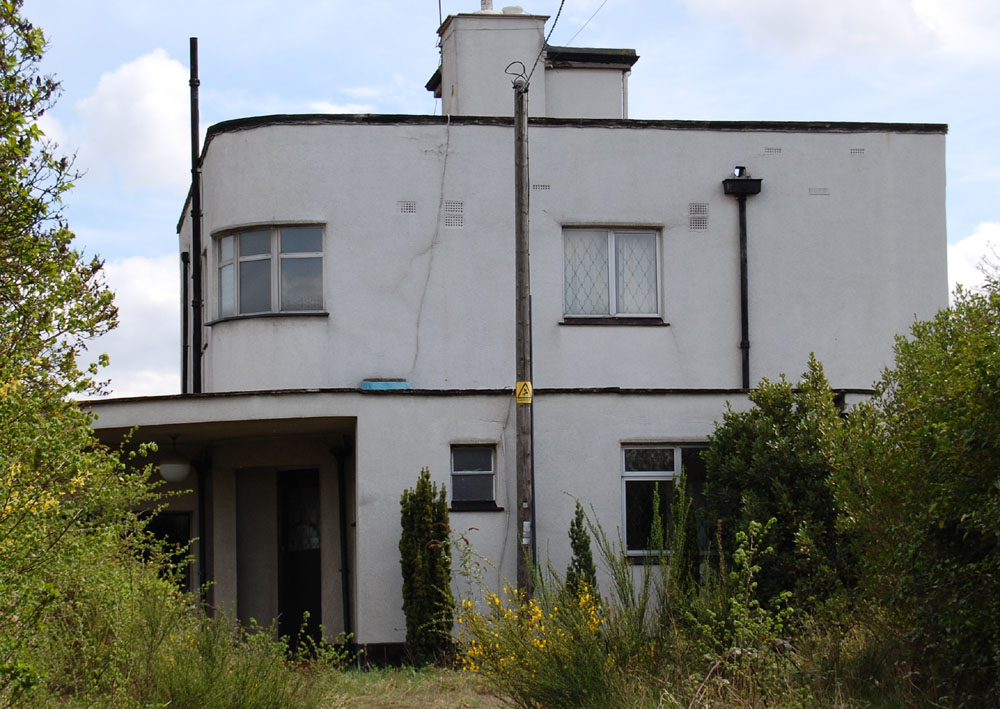
The Sunspan house in Sandy Lane

In addition to the church, the listed buildings in Chadwell include Biggin Farmhouse, Chadwell House, Chadwell Place and Sleeper's Farm. In Sandy Lane there is one of the few examples of an Art Deco "Sunspan" house. This was designed by Wells Coates and exhibited at the Daily Mail Ideal Home Exhibition in 1934.

=== Chadwell in the World War II ===
During World War II, Chadwell was at risk from enemy action both because of its proximity to Tilbury Docks and because German bombers used the Thames to navigate to London. A number of buildings were destroyed or damaged in the Battle of Britain or the Blitz. As part of the air raid protection scheme for London, there was an anti-aircraft battery (designated N16) on former heathland just south of the Greyhound pub that was manned by Canadian soldiers. There were also anti invasion fortifications erected in 1940–41 (for example a Tett turret). Immediately after the end of the war, prefabs (pre-fabricated houses) were erected on the ground north of the church.

=== Administrative history ===
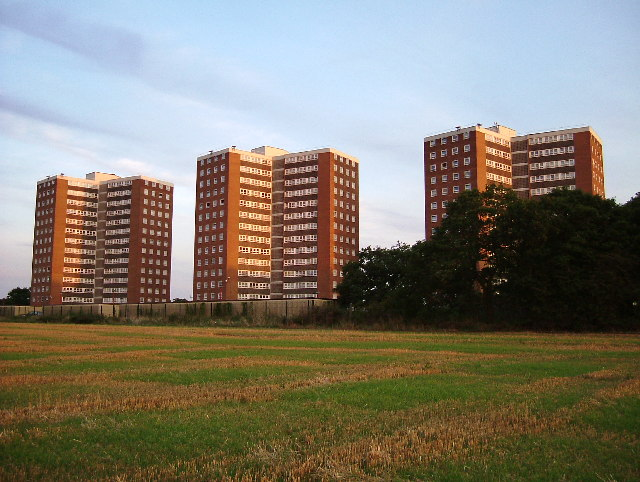
Three tower blocks on Godman Road

Chadwell St Mary was within the Kingdom of Essex, which was one of the kingdoms in the Anglo-Saxon heptarchy and which became the shire and subsequently county of Essex. From 870 until 917, Essex (including Chadwell) was within the Danelaw.

Chadwell is a traditional Church of England parish. It was part of the Orsett deanery and the archdeaconry of Essex. It was within the Diocese of London until 1845 when the archdeaconry became part of the Diocese of Rochester, transferring again to the Diocese of St Albans in 1878. In 1914 it became part of the newly established Diocese of Chelmsford.

Chadwell St Mary was an ancient parish in the Barstable Hundred of Essex. From 1835, the parish was included in the Orsett Poor Law Union, a group of eighteen parishes which collectively administered their responsibilities under the poor laws. Poor law unions subsequently formed the basis for the rural sanitary districts created in 1872, which in turn became rural districts in 1894, with Chadwell St Mary becoming part of the Orsett Rural District.

As part of the 1894 reforms, Chadwell St Mary was also given an elected parish council. It was commented upon at the time that all the parish councillors elected at the first election lived in the nascent town of Tilbury which was growing up around Tilbury Docks at the southern end of the parish, rather than in the older village of Chadwell St Mary or the rural parts of the parish. Tilbury Docks became a separate ecclesiastical parish in 1903, but remained part of the civil parish of Chadwell St Mary.

In 1912, the civil parish of Chadwell St Mary was removed from Orsett Rural District and converted into the Tilbury Urban District, with the town of Tilbury having become the largest settlement in the parish. Tilbury Urban District Council therefore replaced the Chadwell St Mary Parish Council. In 1936, the Tilbury Urban District and the single civil parish of Chadwell St Mary that it contained were both abolished on the creation of the new Thurrock Urban District. At the 1931 census (the last before their abolition), the Chadwell St Mary civil parish and Tilbury Urban District had a population of 16,825. Although abolished as a civil parish in 1936, Chadwell St Mary remains an ecclesiastical parish in the Church of England.

Thurrock Urban District was reformed to become a non-metropolitan district with borough status called Thurrock in 1974. Thurrock Borough Council became a unitary authority in 1998, taking over county-level services in the borough which until then had been provided by Essex County Council. Thurrock remains part of the ceremonial county of Essex for the purposes of lieutenancy.

== Municipal cemetery ==
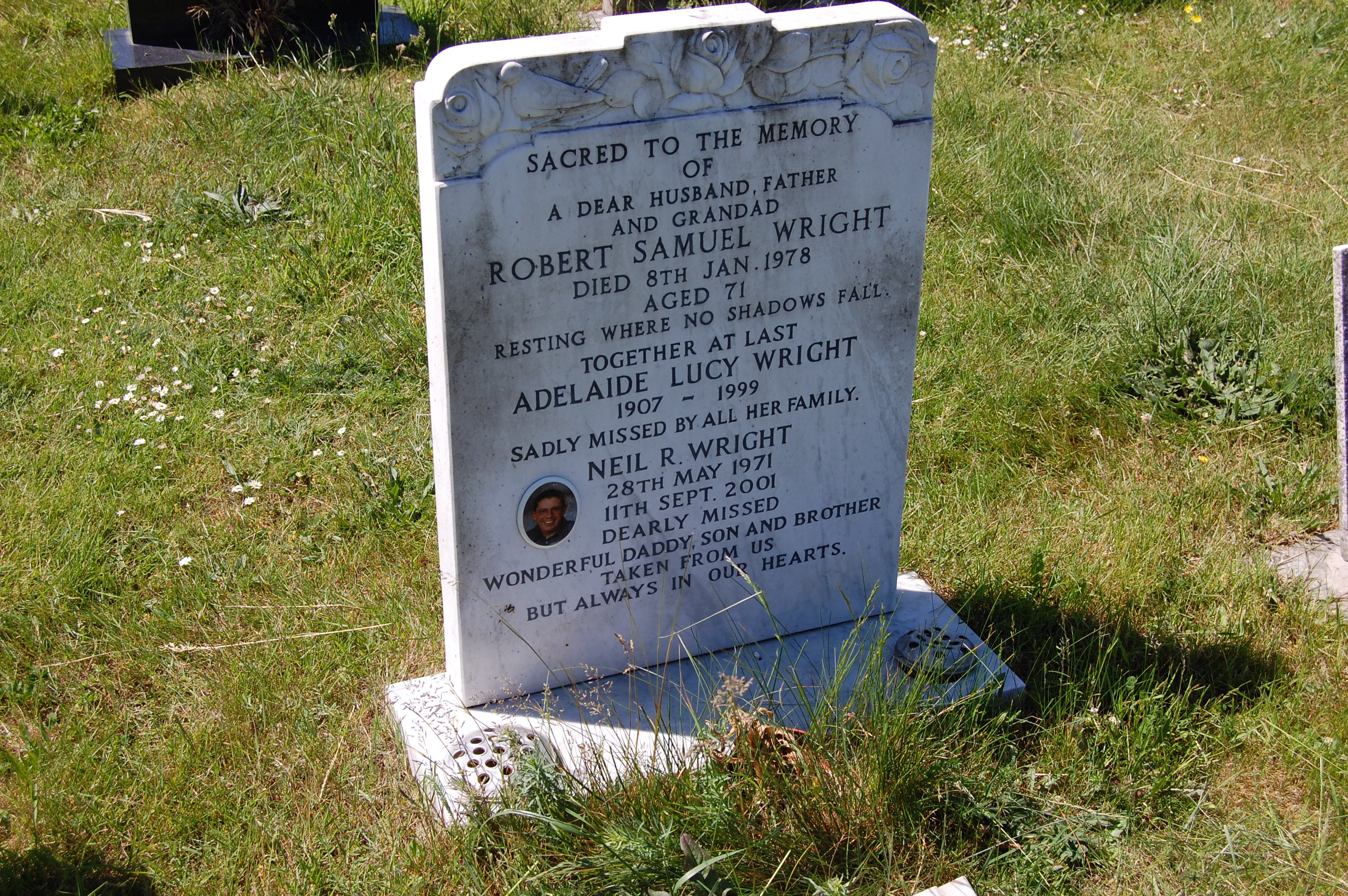
The gravestone of Neil Wright, 9/11 victim

The church graveyard is closed to new burials. The municipal cemetery on Brentwood Road was opened in 1925. It contains more than 30 Commonwealth War Graves Commission graves from the World War II. Among the other graves is that of Neil Wright, a victim of the 9/11 attack on the twin towers.

== Demographics ==
The population of Chadwell increased erratically during the 19th century from 167 in 1801 to 587 in 1881. With the opening of Tilbury Docks, the population grew to 3,391 in 1891.

Year	1801	1811	1821	1831	1841	1851	1861	1871	1881	1891	1901
Population	167	153	202	180	236	282	457	589	587	3,391	5,203

Chadwell St Mary compared
2001 UK Census	Chadwell St Mary ward	Thurrock borough	England
Population	9,631	143,128	49,138,831
Foreign born	3.1%	5.0%	9.2%
White	97.4%	95.3%	90.9%
Asian	0.7%	2.4%	4.6%
Black	1.0%	1.2%	2.3%
Christian	78.0%	75.1%	71.7%
Muslim	0.7%	1.1%	3.1%
Hindu	0.2%	0.6%	1.1%
No religion	14.4%	15.5%	14.6%
Unemployed	3.6%	3.4%	3.3%
Retired	18.1%	11.8%	13.5%

At the 2001 UK census, the Chadwell St Mary electoral ward had a population of 9,631. The ethnicity was 97.4% white, 1.0% mixed race, 0.7% Asian, 1.0% black. The place of birth of residents was 96.9% United Kingdom, 0.5% Republic of Ireland, 0.6% other Western European countries, and 2.0% elsewhere. Religion was recorded as 78% Christian, 0.1% Buddhist, 0.2% Hindu, 0.1% Sikh, 0.1% Jewish, and 0.7% Muslim. 14.4% were recorded as having no religion, 0.2% had an alternative religion and 6.3% did not state their religion.

The economic activity of residents aged 16–74 was 37.5% in full-time employment, 12.9% in part-time employment, 5.2% self-employed, 3.6% unemployed, 1.9% students with jobs, 2.1% students without jobs, 18.1% retired, 8.7% looking after home or family, 6.9% permanently sick or disabled and 3.1% economically inactive for other reasons. The industry of employment of residents was 23.9% retail, 14.2% manufacturing, 9.4% construction, 8.8% real estate, 8% health and social work, 5.4% education, 12.2% transport and communications, 3.5% public administration, 4.2% hotels and restaurants, 4.7% finance, 0.8% agriculture and 4.9% other. Compared with national figures, the ward had a relatively high proportion of workers in retail, transport and communications. Of the ward's residents aged 16–74, 6.9% had a higher education qualification or the equivalent, compared with 19.9% nationwide. According to Office for National Statistics estimates, during the period of April 2004 to March 2005 the average gross weekly income of households was £490, compared with an average of £650 in South East England.

In 2007, Chadwell was described by the former local MP, Andrew Mackinlay, as one of the "pensioner hot spots" of Thurrock. Nearly a quarter of the current population is sixty or over.

== Education ==
There are three primary schools serving the Chadwell area – Chadwell St Mary Primary, Herringham Primary and Woodside Academy (formerly Woodside Primary), although Woodside is in an adjacent parish. The wood that gives Woodside its name is Terrel's Heath, a now wooded area of former heath in the north east of the parish. The Gateway Academy (Secondary) is shared with Chadwell St Mary and Tilbury (near the corner of Marshfoot Road and St Chad's Road). Palmer's Sixth Form College covers Chadwell St Mary and Thames Park Secondary School also covers Chadwell St Mary, although it is just across the parish boundary in Little Thurrock as was the Thurrock campus of the South Essex College of Further and Higher Education before it moved to Grays.

== Politics ==
Chadwell has three councillors on Thurrock council. For most recent elections, until 2015, Labour Councillors have been elected. In 2015, a UKIP (subsequently Thurrock Independents) candidate was elected. In the 2021 local elections a Conservative was elected for the first time. Currently elected are Councillor Daniel Chukwu (Labour), Councillor Sara Muldowney (Labour), and Councillor Adam Carter (Conservative).

== Notable people ==
James Temple who signed the death warrant for Charles I lived in this parish between 1607 and 1622. Another regicide, Temple's kinsman Edward Whalley also lived in the parish in the 1620s and 1630s.

World javelin champion, Fatima Whitbread, grew up in Chadwell St Mary after being adopted by the Whitbread family when she was thirteen.

Daniel Defoe, the writer, managed and later owned a tile factory on the Tilbury Marshes (part of Chadwell at the time) and lived in a house on the edge of the river. It is sometimes suggested that Defoe was born in the parish or that his family came from this parish, but research by a local historian has proved this unfounded.

Bobby Howe, ex-West Ham United and Bournemouth & Boscombe footballer, was born in the village.
