= Step Into Dance =

Step into Dance is an inclusive dance programme for schools and youth groups in London and Essex The programme is run by the Royal Academy of Dance and funded by the Jack Petchey Foundation.

Step into Dance began in 2006 after Jack Petchey approached the RAD with an idea to set up an extra-curricular dance programme for young people in London. Initially targeting particular boroughs in London, Step into Dance launched with a pilot of 30 schools. By 2015/2016, 200 schools were participating.

Step into Dance is one of the Jack Petchey Foundation's flagship projects. As of July 2016 the Foundation had donated over 3 million pounds to the programme and over 30 thousand students have participated.

In March 2014, Step into Dance launched its Young Ambassador Scheme.
