= Baker Street Mill, Orsett =

Smock mill in Essex, England

Orsett Mill
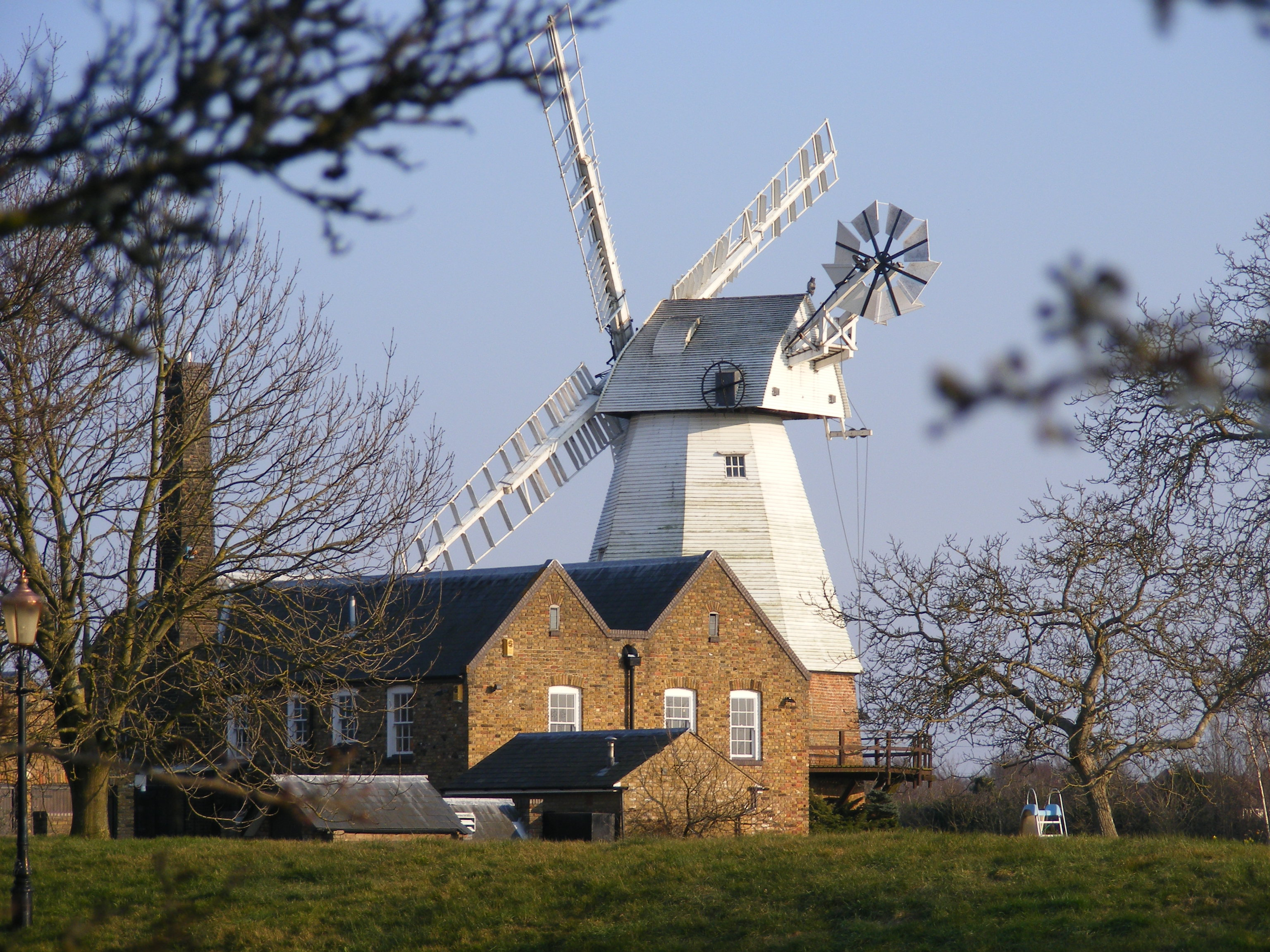
- The converted mill in March 2016

Origin
- Mill name: Baker Street Mill
- Mill location: TQ 633 813
- Coordinates: 51°30′22″N 0°21′11″E
- Operator(s): Private
- Year built: Late 18th century

Information
- Purpose: Corn mill
- Type: Smock mill
- Storeys: Three-storey smock
- Base storeys: Two-storey base
- Smock sides: Eight-sided smock
- No. of sails: Four sails
- Type of sails: Double Patent Sails
- Windshaft: Cast iron
- Winding: Fantail
- Fantail blades: Eight blades
- Auxiliary power: Steam mill adjoining
- No. of pairs of millstones: Three pairs

Baker Street Mill is a grade II listed smock mill at Baker Street, Orsett, Essex, England which has been part adapted to residential use on its lower two floors only.

== History ==
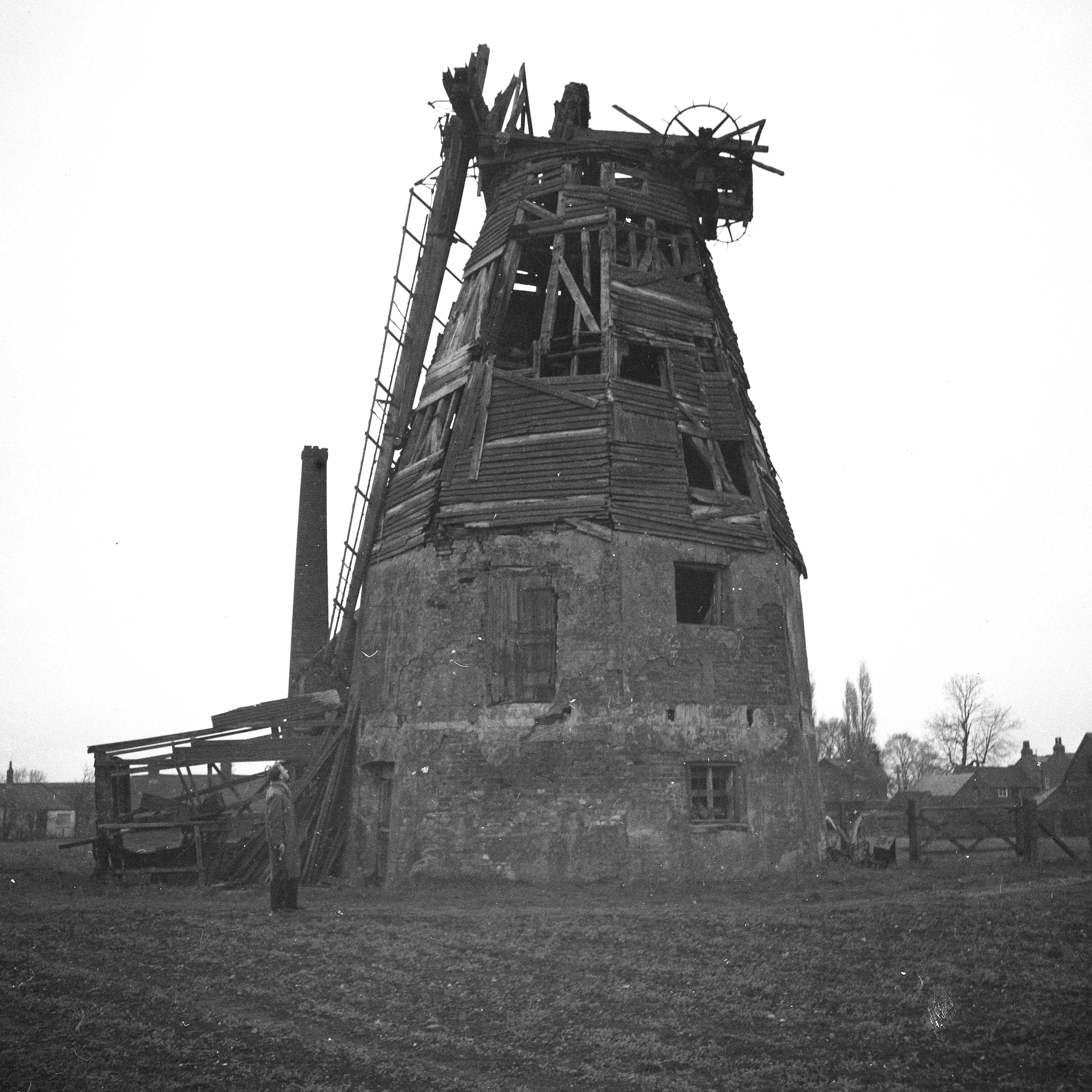
The derelict mill in 1964

Baker Street Mill is said to have been built in 1765, although a date of 1762 is recorded in the mill. The earliest firm reference for the mill is 1796, this from a sale notice in 1808. It is likely that the mill was raised a storey between 1762 and 1814. The mill was working by wind until 1914. A steam mill was built near the mill towards the end of its working life, a new boiler being supplied in 1906.

The mill gradually became more and more derelict, losing two sails in 1926 to a lightning strike. The windmill and steam mill were converted to residential accommodation in 1982.

== Description ==
Baker Street Mill is a three-storey smock mill on a two-storey brick base, with a stage at first-floor level. The mill had four double patent sails, and the Kentish-style cap is winded by a fantail.

=== Mill ===
Baker Street Mill has an octagonal two-storey brick base, the walls of which are almost 3 feet (914 mm) thick at ground level. The base is 20 feet 4 inches (6.20 m) across the flats and 18 feet 6 inches (5.64 m) high, the brickwork at the top of the base is about 18 inches (457 mm) thick.

The smock is 21 feet 8 inches (6.60 m) from sill to curb. The mill is 11 feet (3.35 m) diameter at the curb, the cant posts being about 10 inches (254 mm) square. The stage is at first-floor level, 8 feet 6 inches (2.59 m) above the ground.

The cap is of Kentish style, with blisters for the brake wheel, with an overall height of some 8 feet (2.44 m), giving the mill an overall height of about 46 feet 6 inches (14.17 m). Winding is by an eight-bladed fantail, although originally the mill was winded by hand.

=== Sails and windshaft ===
Baker Street Mill has a cast-iron windshaft and four double patent sails. The windshaft was originally a wooden one. The last working sails were an odd pair, the outer pair having eight bays of four shutters and one bay of three, the inner pair having eleven bays of three shutters.

=== Machinery ===
The wooden brake wheel is of clasp arm construction, 8 feet (2.44 m) diameter. It has been converted from compass arm construction. The rim is of elm. The Wallower is wooden, as is the upright shaft. The compass arm great spur wheel is 7 feet (2.13 m) diameter, and has six arms. The mill originally worked two pairs of overdrift millstones, with a third pair being added later.

=== Fantail ===
Baker Street Mill was winded by an eight-bladed fantail, replacing the original hand winding by means of a Y wheel and chain, which was retained as a standby method of winding the mill.

== Millers ==
- James Woollings 1830–1839
- William Woolings 1848–1886
- Emma Woolings 1890–1894
- Thomas Ridgewell 1898
- Christopher Moore 1902
- Arthur William Cocks 1908
- William Scott 1910
- H Lindsey 1912

List reference
