= Hangman's Wood and Deneholes =

Protected area in Essex, England

- Site of Special Scientific Interest
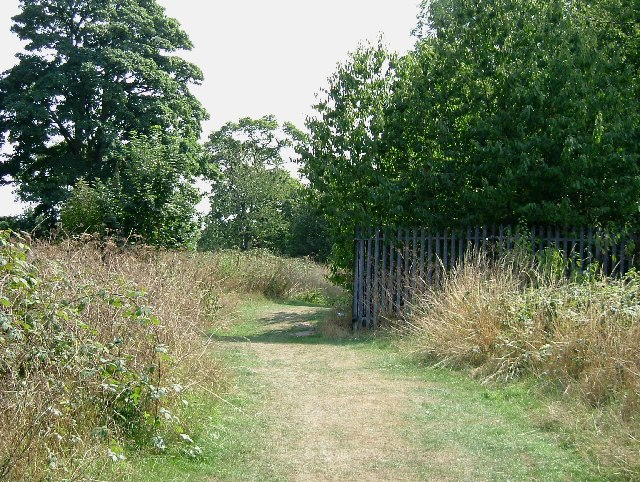
- Location of Hangman's Wood and Deneholes.
- Area of search: Essex
- Grid reference: TQ 631794
- Coordinates: 51.4896°N 0.3477°E
- Interest: Biological
- Area: 3.0 ha (7.4 acres)
- Notification date: 1986
- Location map: Magic Map

Hangman's Wood and Deneholes is a 3-hectare (7.4-acre) biological Site of Special Scientific Interest in Little Thurrock in Essex. The deneholes, which were created by medieval chalk mining, are a scheduled monument.

The name Hangmans Wood dates back to at least the mid-17th century, when it was recorded on an estate map. Trees in the wood include oak, ash, sycamore and wild cherry.

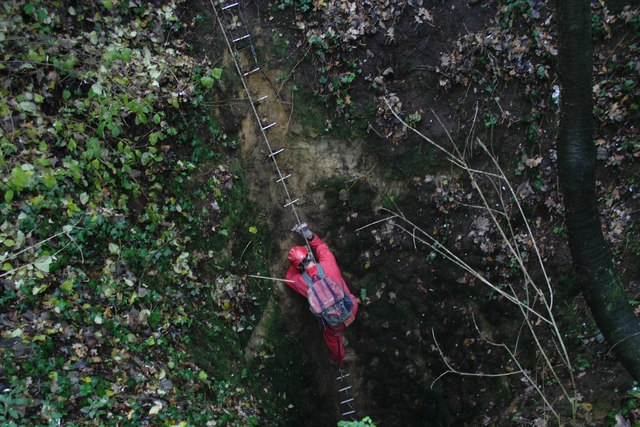
Investigating a denehole in Hangman's Wood

The wood contains a number of deneholes which were investigated by the Essex Field Club at the end of the 19th century. There is normally no access to the deneholes, but permission can be obtained from the council. The deneholes are the most important underground hibernation sites for bats in Essex, with three species; brown long-eared bat, Natterer's bat and Daubenton's bat. The oak woodland is ancient, and it provides a feeding habitat for the bats.

The deneholes in the wood, which were sometimes known as Cunobeline's gold mines, are described by English Heritage as medieval or post-medieval and were used for chalk or flint mining. The origin of these deneholes is discussed by Tony Benton. There appears to have been more than 70 holes in the wood at one time, concentrated to the north of the wood. Most only survive now as shallow dips in the ground.

The bridlepath which crosses Grangewood Avenue and runs beside Woodside School to connect Hangman's Wood with nearby Terrel's Heath is part of an ancient route from Coalhouse Point in East Tilbury to the bridge or causeway at Aveley.

== Land ownership ==
All land within Hangman's Wood and Deneholes SSSI is owned by the local authority.
