= List of Church of England churches in Thurrock =

Thurrock contains 17 parish churches for traditional Church of England parishes that were in existence before 1850. There are a further five parishes, parts of which are within Thurrock, but for which the parish church lies outside the Thurrock unitary authority. During the 19th and 20th centuries, reorganisation created new parishes and churches whilst other parishes were amalgamated and buildings made redundant.

Parish	Dedication	Date	Listing	Status
Aveley	St Michael	before 1300	Grade I	
Bulphan	St Mary the Virgin	15th-century with 19th-century rebuilding	Grade I	
Chadwell St Mary	St Mary the Virgin	before 1066	Grade I	
Corringham	St Mary the Virgin	before 1066; Saxon stone work on the south wall of the nave and chancel	Grade I	
East Tilbury	St Catherine	before 1300	Grade I	
Fobbing	St Michael	before 1066; Saxon stonework and blocked window	Grade I	
Grays Thurrock	St Peter and St Paul	c. 1254; possibly before 1085	Grade II*	
Horndon-on-the-Hill	St Peter and St Paul	before 1066	Grade I	
Langdon Hills	St Mary and All Saints	before 1300, but present building from 15th century	Grade II*	Redundant – private dwelling
Little Thurrock	St Mary the Virgin	before 1300; possibly 1170	Grade II*	
Mucking	St John the Baptist	present building largely 19th-century, but with some earlier features	Grade II*	Redundant – private dwelling
Orsett	St Giles and All Saints	before 1066	Grade I	
South Ockendon	St Nicholas	before 1085 present building mainly 15th-century but with 13th-century tower	Grade I	
Stanford-le-Hope	St Margaret of Antioch	before 1300	Grade I	
Stifford	St Mary the Virgin	before 1066	Grade II*	
West Thurrock	St Clement	before 1090 foundations of 11th-century round nave visible	Grade I	Redundant – owned by Procter & Gamble
West Tilbury	St James	before 1200	Grade II*	Redundant – private dwelling
