= Biggin =

Biggin can refer to:

- Biggin (Dovedale and Parwich Ward), Derbyshire, in the Peak District
- Biggin Hill, a town in Greater London
- London Biggin Hill Airport, an airport near Biggin Hill, London
- Biggin by Hulland, Derbyshire, near Hulland
- Biggin, North Yorkshire
- Biggin, Warwickshire
- Biggin, Essex
- a nightcap
- coffee biggin or tea biggin with a separate container to hold the ground coffee or tea (named after its inventor)
