= Francis Whitmore =

Sir Francis Whitmore KCB CMG DSO TD JP Bt
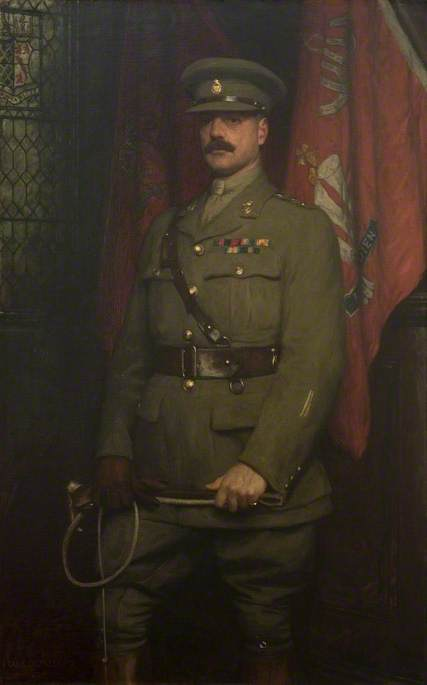
- Whitmore in 1919, by Frank Dicksee
- Born: 20 April 1872; Gumley Hall, Leicestershire
- Died: 12 June 1962 (aged 90); Orsett
- Military career
- Allegiance: United Kingdom
- Branch: British Army
- Service years: 1892–1927
- Rank: Colonel
- Commands: Essex Yeomanry; 10th Royal Hussars
- Conflicts: Boer War; First World War

Colonel Sir Francis Henry Douglas Charlton Whitmore, 1st Baronet KCB CMG DSO TD JP (20 April 1872 – 12 June 1962) was a British Army officer and landowner.

== Family home ==
He was the son of Thomas Whitmore, an officer in the Royal Horse Guards. Thomas had inherited Orsett Hall (in Orsett, Essex) as a result of a gambling debt incurred by the previous owner, Digby Wingfield. The estate passed to Francis on the death of his father in 1907.

== Military career ==
Whitmore was educated at Eton and in 1892 he was commissioned into the 1st Essex Artillery Volunteers. He later transferred to the Essex Yeomanry and served in the Boer War with the Imperial Yeomanry. He served in the First World War and was promoted lieutenant-colonel in 1915, eventually commanding the 10th Royal Hussars. He was mentioned in despatches four times, and awarded the Distinguished Service Order in 1917. In the 1918 New Year Honours list he was made a Companion of the Order of St Michael and St George (CMG). After the war he wrote The 10th (P.W.O.) Royal Hussars and the Essex Yeomanry during the European War, 1914–1918 which was published in 1920.

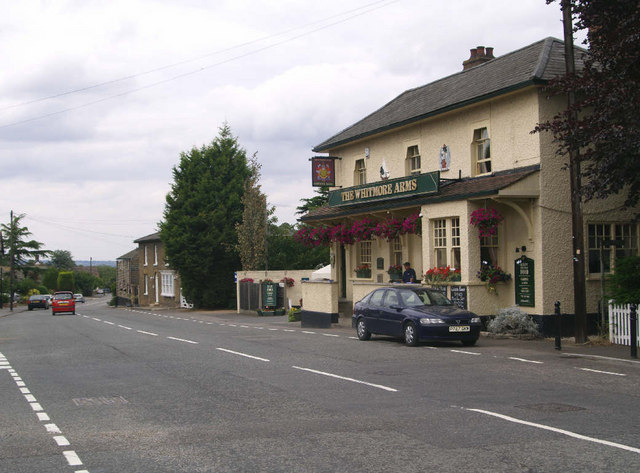
The Whitmore Arms, Orsett

Whitmore became a Justice of the Peace in 1899 and was High Sheriff of Essex in 1922. He served as Lord Lieutenant of Essex from 1936 to 1958 and was created a baronet, of Orsett, in the County of Essex in 1954.

== Family life ==
He was married twice, first to Violet Houldsworth (d. 1927) and subsequently to Ellis Johnsen (d. 2001). He had a son and a daughter by his second wife. He was a keen traveller, including a visit to the Empire State Building in New York in 1931 when it opened. Photograph albums and scrapbooks from his travels are in the Essex Record Office.

Orsett church contains hatchments to his father and his first wife – the latter was painted by Whitmore. The other hatchments in the church were restored at the expense of Whitmore following a fire. He also painted portraits, two of which are in the Thurrock Museum.

Whitmore died in 1962 and was buried with full military honours at Orsett parish church. The funeral was an important local event and the head gardener on the Orsett Estate, Alfred George Cuthbert, took a number of photos of the funeral for his album. Four of these were published in 2018.

The baronetcy and estate were inherited by his son, Sir John Whitmore (racing driver). He is commemorated in the name of a local pub, The Whitmore Arms. His portrait from W.W.1 hangs in the headquarters of the 70th (Essex Yeomanry) Signal Squadron. A later portrait in Lord Lieutenant's uniform by Herbert James Gunn hangs in the Shire Hall in Chelmsford. On 10 September 2015, a Thurrock Heritage plaque was unveiled commemorating Whitmore and other Officers and Men of the Essex Yeomanry and 10th Royal Hussars who served in the Great War.

== Notes ==
Honorary titles
Preceded by Sir Richard Colvin	Lord Lieutenant of Essex; 1936–1958	Succeeded by Sir John Ruggles-Brise, Bt
Baronetage of the United Kingdom
New title	Baronet (of Orsett, Essex); 1954–1962	Succeeded by John Whitmore
