= St James' Church, West Tilbury =

Church of St James
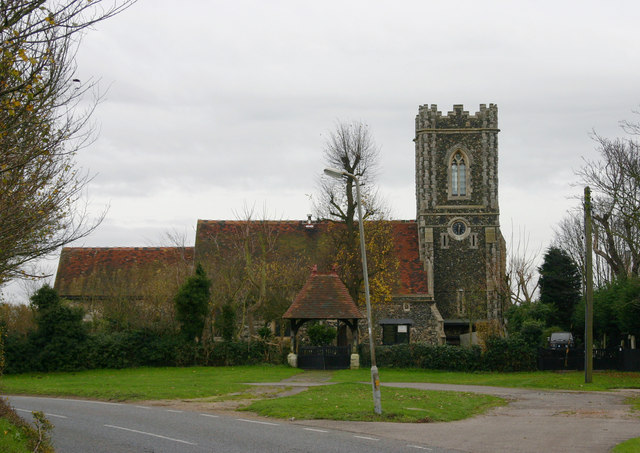
- Church of St James
- 51.473739°N 0.390639°E
- Location: Church Road West Tilbury, Essex, RM16 4DJ
- Country: England
- Previous denomination: Church of England
- Website: www.stjameswt.co.uk/index.htm

History
- Status: Redundant

Architecture
- Heritage designation: Grade II* listed

The Church of St James is a grade II* listed former parish church in West Tilbury. It is constructed from flint and rubble and was restored by W Benton. It contains remnants of Early Norman windows. There is an elaborate memorial in the chancel to Lady Gordon and to her husband, the reverend Sir Adam Gordon (3rd Baronet) who was rector from 1796 to 1817.

== The building and its contents ==
It was closed in 1979 and declared redundant in 1984. The queen confirmed the scheme for the redundancy of the church on 11 April 1984. The building was subsequently converted to a private dwelling house, with use of parts of the burial ground as garden premises. It retains various memorial floor slabs in the sacrarium and some mural monuments, including that to 14 parishioners who died in the armed forces during the Great War of 1914–1919 and the 1939–1945 conflict. The 5 Bells of post-medieval date were removed and distributed to other churches of the Orsett Deanery.

The church building is initially of late 11th or early 12th century date in local flint rubble and imported Kentish rag, with various other limestone and tufa dressings to the fragmentary early window positions. A north aisle once existed, said to have been removed in the early 18th century, save for one piece which was retained as a porch. There was a stone tower and pointed spire, shown upon the Walker survey of 1584, described as being an important navigational feature for mariners upon the river – (such alignment marks – another was Hawksbury hilltop at Fobbing – were used to steer vessels through the various shoals or mudbanks in the channel).

== General Fairfax ==
A tradition of St. James’ Church being defiled and used as horse stabling by General Fairfax's troopers on their march from Maidstone and Rochester to Colchester in June 1648 was long prevalent but is now usually disregarded. The victorious army crossed the river on Sunday, 11th after morning service and were at Lexden close to their target the following night. Such a forced march with 1000 horses could hardly have allowed any lingering. But Tilbury district was under parliamentary control anyway and some vandalising may have ensued through this wartime period.

== Storm of 1703 ==
There may have been damage in the great storm of November 1703 causing decay in the rubble fillings. There were found to have ‘mouldred’ in February 1711 when the nave of the church suddenly collapsed, ‘the pillars and part of the Outside Walls ... giving way’. A ‘brief’ – a countrywide appeal for charitable donations – was eventually organised and, in about 1712 or the year following, parson William Philps, began a rebuilding at an estimated cost of £1,117. The chancel appears to have been least affected, but the nave required much renewal, while the old stone ‘seamark’ tower was entirely replaced by a timber frame, lath and plastered structure, in which was housed the ring of five bells.

St. James’ had been referred to in the parishioners’ petition at this time as the garrison church for nearby Tilbury Fort. A wooden gallery especially for the troops had been added during the early 19th century, referred to in the Ecclesiastical Census of 1851 as being still present.

== Refurbishment ==
With 1879, during the early incumbency of the Rev. James Bonamee Dobree an entire restoration began (part of the Victorian revolution in refurbishing the English parish church) over a period of 4 years. This was under the direction of W Benton. The tower was entirely rebuilt in flint with stone dressings and a clock. The spire, which had been a feature for several centuries, was omitted. This final stage was completed in 1883 in memory of James Burness, lord of West Tilbury manor.

== Well known people associated with St James ==
Among the former parish priests was William Laud, later Archbishop of Canterbury.
