= Orsett Heath Academy =

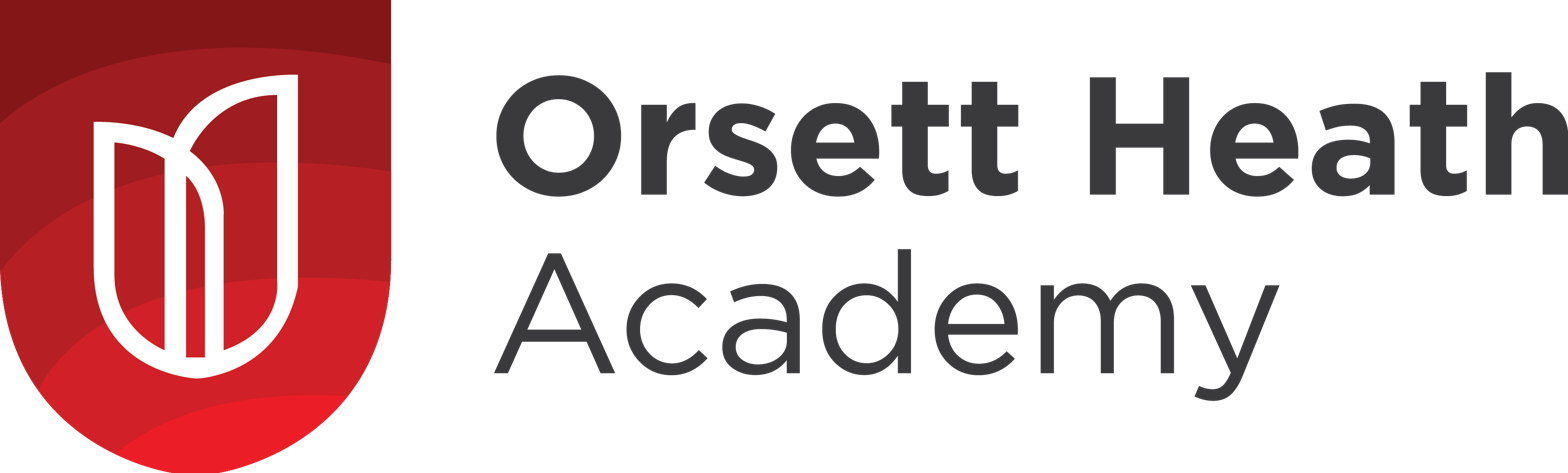

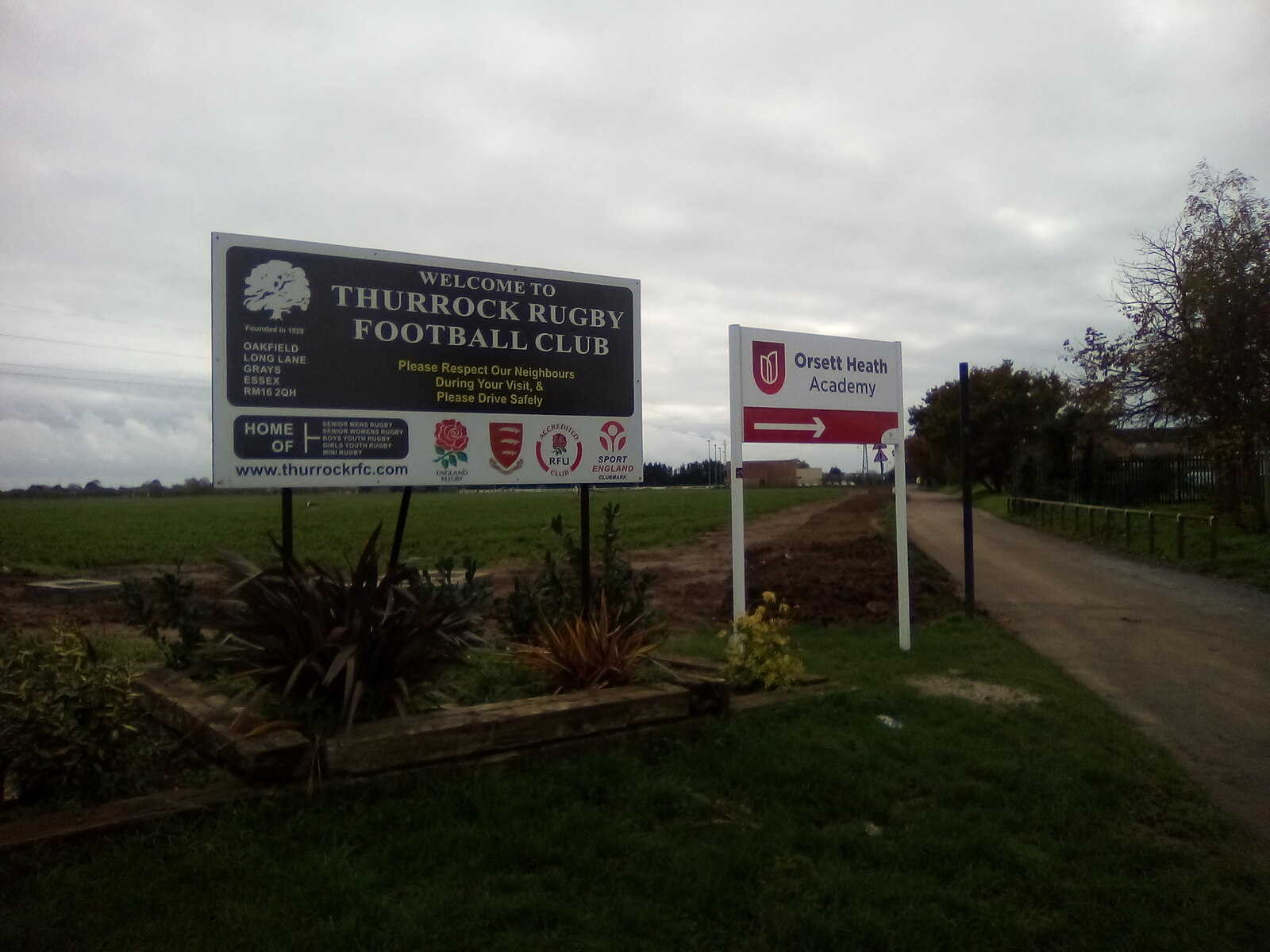
- The lane leading to the Orsett Heath Academy

Location
- Long Lane; Grays, Essex, RM16 2QH; England; 51.4938°N 0.3505°E

Information
- Type: Free School
- Established: 1 September 2020
- Specialist: Sports
- Department for Education URN: 147847 Tables
- Ofsted: Reports
- Executive Headteacher: Simon Bell
- Head of School: Sian Rawson
- Gender: Coeducational
- Age: 11 to 16
- Enrolment: 564
- Capacity: 1200 (planned)
- Colours: Red and white
- Affiliation: William Edwards School
- Admission Policy: Non-selective
- Eponym: Orsett Heath
- Trust: South West Essex Community Education Trust
- Website: https://www.orsettheathacademy.org.uk

The Orsett Heath Academy is a coeducational secondary free school academy in Grays, Essex, England. It is the newest member of the South West Essex Community Education Trust and was built under the leadership of nearby William Edwards School. Plans to build the new school were approved in April 2017 and it opened in September 2020. Simon Bell of William Edwards is the executive headteacher and the head of school is Sian Rawson. The school models William Edwards' curriculum and specialism in sports. It also originally had an additional specialism in the arts.

== History ==
In July 2016 the William Edwards School and the South West Essex Community Education Trust applied to the Department for Education to build a new free school with the expectation that it would be completed by September 2019. It was speculated that the school was not to be built on the Orsett Heath but instead on nearby Gammon Field. The plans were approved in April 2017 but the opening was delayed as the school's campus still hadn't been built due to delays in funding. The government granted the school permission to set up a temporary campus via a lease agreement with Blackshots based Thurrock Rugby Club and the school opened in September 2020, one year later than was scheduled.

The school's permanent campus, which will have a capacity for 1200 students and is located adjacent to Stanford Road, is currently under construction on the Blackshots playing fields. Originally expected to open in September 2022, there has been a delay in its completion due to the collapse of Caledonian Modular Ltd, the company that was tasked with building the site. Another building will be added to the temporary campus at Thurrock Rugby Club to make room for the enrolment of another 120 students in September 2022.

== Headteachers ==
- Simon Bell - Headteacher of William Edwards School and executive headteacher of Orsett Heath Academy (2020–present)
- Sian Rawson - Head of school for Orsett Heath Academy (2020–present)
