= Little Thurrock =

Area of Grays, Essex, England

Coordinates: 51.491098°N 0.339296°E

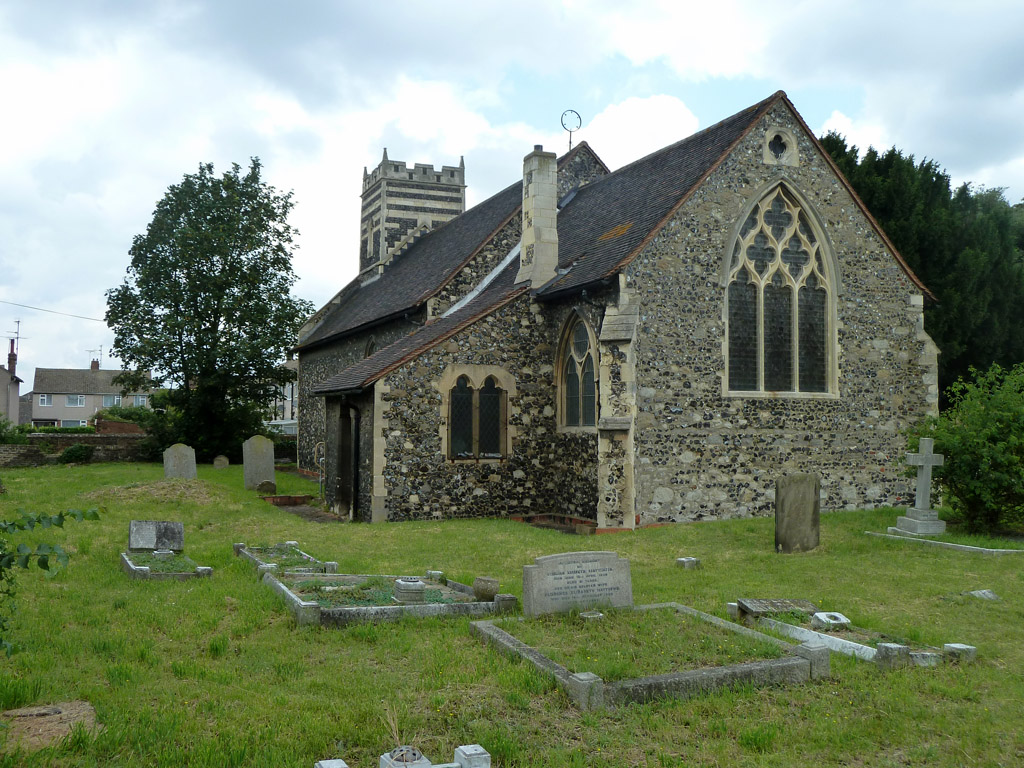
- Little Thurrock church

- Location within Essex
- OS grid reference: TQ625795
- Unitary authority: Thurrock
- Ceremonial county: Essex
- Region: East
- Country: England
- Sovereign state: United Kingdom
- Post town: GRAYS
- Postcode district: RM17
- Dialling code: 01375
- Police: Essex
- Fire: Essex
- Ambulance: East of England
- UK Parliament: Thurrock

Little Thurrock is a suburb of Grays in Essex, England. It lies to the north-east of the town centre. Little Thurrock was historically a separate village and parish. The parish was abolished for civil purposes in 1936 on the creation of Thurrock Urban District, which was reformed to become the borough of Thurrock in 1974. Little Thurrock is now classed as part of the Grays built up area.

== Location ==
Little Thurrock is on the north bank of the river Thames, about 25 miles (40 km) east of London. It was originally a separate settlement, but housing and other developments in the 20th century have resulted in a continuous built up area with Grays, of which Little Thurrock is now a part.

Hangman's Wood is a small wooded areas in the parish. Hangman's Wood is well known for containing numerous deneholes which were sometimes known as Cunobeline's gold mines. The origin of these deneholes is discussed by Tony Benton who concludes they were the result of chalk extraction. The deneholes are an important roosting site for rare bats.

== Geology and ecology ==
The southern part of Little Thurrock was formerly a tidal saltmarsh. The higher, northern area is part of a 100 feet (30 m) terrace extending for some miles east and west – a rich source of both gravel and chalk deposits which have been extracted for centuries. The gravel workings include the Globe Pit which is a Site of Special Scientific Interest and the location of many archaeological finds from the Clactonian period. Around Hangman's Wood and Terrel's Heath, there is little trace of the heathland habitat and associated fauna which would once have been characteristic of the area but the adjacent woodland together with the pond and wild life garden in Woodside Primary School attract a number of creatures. These include green and great spotted woodpeckers, a number of different mammals and the rare great crested newt. The trees on Terrel's Heath are mainly oaks with wild bluebells in spring time.

== History ==
Thurrock is a Saxon name meaning "the bottom of a ship". Little Thurrock is one of three "Thurrocks", the others being West Thurrock and Grays Thurrock. Historically, Little Thurrock was also called East Thurrock and Grays Thurrock was also called Great Thurrock.

The parish church is dedicated to St Mary the Virgin. The original building probably dates from 1170. The church was extensively restored in Victorian times.

== Schools ==
Little Thurrock has a number of schools, including Woodside Academy, a campus of Thurrock Special School and the Thurrock campus of South Essex College. Torrel's School was closed and later re-opened and is now known as The Gateway Academy, with a new site on Marshfoot Road in Chadwell St Mary.

== Governance ==
There is one tier of local government covering Little Thurrock, at unitary authority level: Thurrock Council. Two of Thurrock's wards are named after Little Thurrock: Little Thurrock Blackshots, and Little Thurrock Rectory.

=== Administrative history ===
Little Thurrock was an ancient parish in the Barstable Hundred of Essex. When elected parish and district councils were established in 1894, the parish was included in the Orsett Rural District. The civil parish and rural district were both abolished in 1936 on the creation of Thurrock Urban District. At the 1931 census (the last before the abolition of the civil parish), Little Thurrock had a population of 4,428.

Thurrock Urban District was reformed to become a non-metropolitan district with borough status called Thurrock in 1974. Thurrock Borough Council became a unitary authority in 1998, taking over county-level services in the borough which until then had been provided by Essex County Council. Thurrock remains part of the ceremonial county of Essex for the purposes of lieutenancy.
