= St Clement's Church, West Thurrock =

Church in Essex, England

St Clement's Church
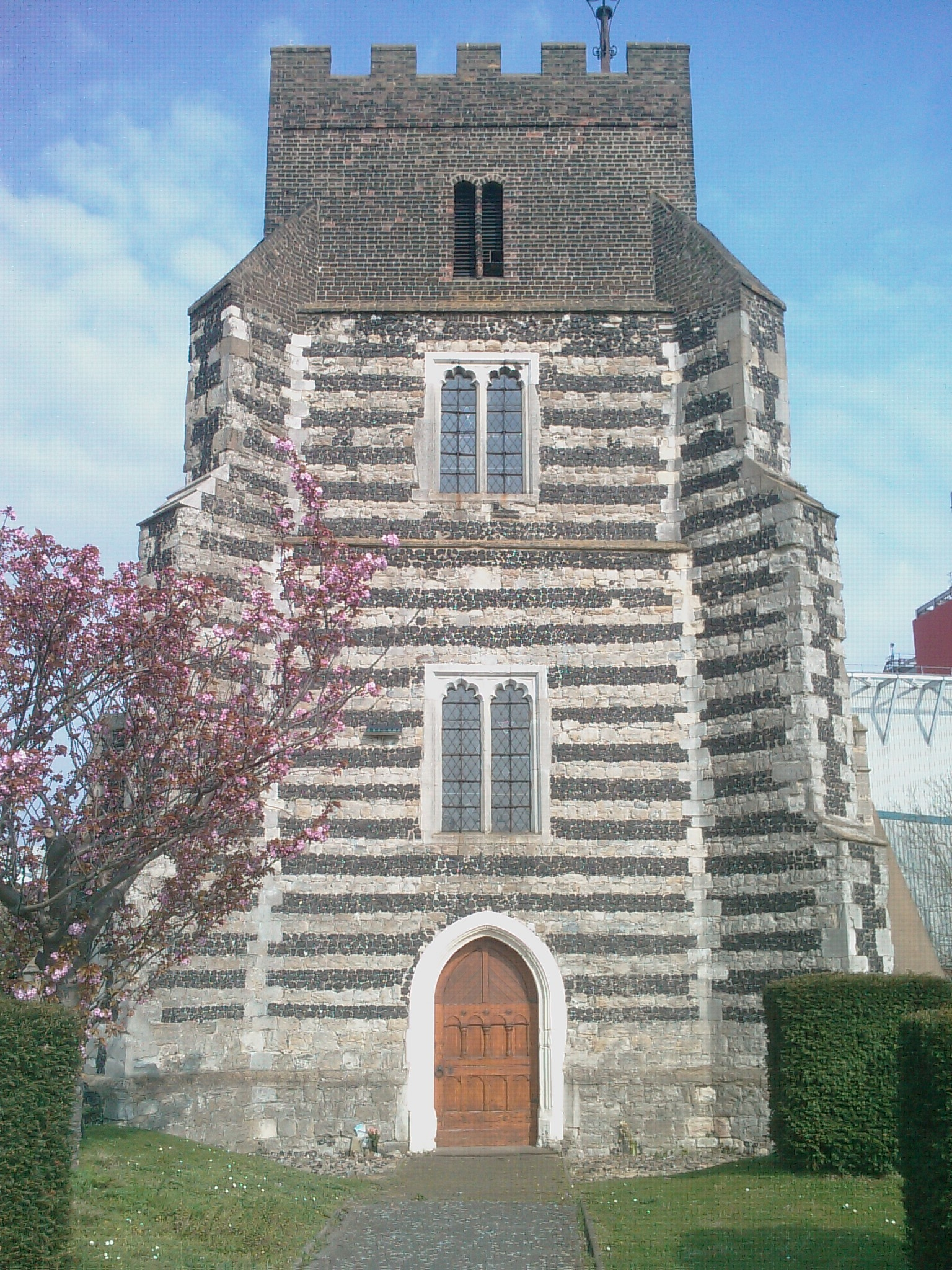
- St Clement's Church

- Shown within Essex

Religion
- Affiliation: Church of England
- Province: Province of Canterbury
- Status: Preserved

Location
- Location: West Thurrock, Essex, England
- Coordinates: 51.4722°N 0.29239°E

Architecture
- Groundbreaking: Early 13th century
- Completed: Late 15th century

Specifications
- Direction of façade: West
- Length: 74 feet 6 inches (22.71 m)
- Width: 41 feet 3 inches (12.57 m)
- Width (nave): 16 feet 9 inches (5.11 m)
- Materials: Knapped flint Reigate Stone

St Clement's Church is a Grade I listed building in West Thurrock, Essex, England. It is the church for one of the traditional (Church of England) parishes in Thurrock. The building featured in the film Four Weddings and a Funeral.

== Construction ==
A church has occupied the site in West Thurrock since pre-conquest days. The first church close to the river would have been on the strip of gravel which the present day church stands. There was no sea wall or river bank as we know it today. In the early twelfth century the church existed with a circular tower serving as the nave. In the early thirteenth century the building was widened with north and south aisles built on either side of the rectangular chancel and by the late thirteenth century the building had been extended with a new chancel; the existing chancel became the nave, and north and south chapels were added. The chancel's eastern wall was later demolished and moved to its present position.

By the late fifteenth century the north and south walls of the chancel were removed and replaced with arcades, and the circular nave was brought down and replaced with a large tower. In 1628 the east wall of the chancel was reconstructed. Repairs were made to the tower and south aisle in 1640 and 1711 respectively. Early in the nineteenth century the south chapel was rebuilt and shortened. In 1906, major repairs were undertaken, including a new roof on the chancels and aisles; four years later the east wall of the chancel was reconstructed. Repairs were also made in 1935 as iron ties were fitted to strengthen the walls, which had become damaged by subsidence. In 1940 Procter & Gamble began production at a new plant neighbouring the church and would later hold the historic building's future in its hands. In 1950 the church's flat roofs had to be repaired once more after the lead lining was stolen. Three years later more roof work was completed when the building tiles were replaced. The tower and north chapel were also repaired at this time.

== Recent history ==
In 1960 the church was given a Grade I listed building status. However, in 1977 regular services had to be stopped due to cold and damp conditions during the winter. Shortly afterwards the church was used for a scheme for young unemployed people, called the Ark project, and the interior was gutted, but the project failed after a few years and the building fell into decay and was vandalised.

Procter & Gamble, whose factory is adjacent to the churchyard, offered to take responsibility for the church and its yard in 1987 as the company celebrated its 150th anniversary. Three years later, 50 years after the factory opened, the church's restoration was complete.

The interior and exterior of the church featured in the film Four Weddings and a Funeral, as the setting for the funeral of Simon Callow's character.

The churchyard has been given over to nature in recent years, although it is still consecrated. There are many memorials in the grounds of the church, including one to the 16 boys of the reformatory ship Cornwall and their training officer, killed in the River Thames at Purfleet on 30 August 1915 when their cutter Alert was struck by a tug.

The church was open every day during the London Olympics, from 11am until 3pm and held further opening days on 17 and 18 August 2013. Currently it can be visited on the first weekend of every month between April and September between 11am and 3pm.

== Brasses ==
The church has two early memorial brasses to members of the Heies family. The brasses were stolen in the 1970s and were later donated back to the church by a donor who had bought them not knowing that they had been stolen.

== Publications ==
- Harrold, Christopher (1992). The Story of St. Clement's. Newcastle upon Tyne: Procter & Gamble. ISBN 0-9520052-0-4.
