= Reigate Stone =

Form of sandstone used for building

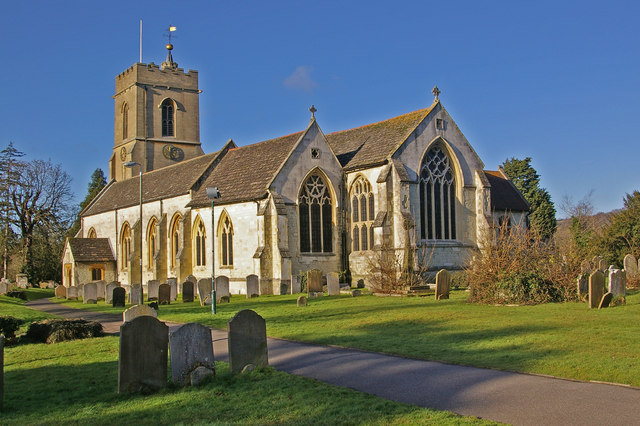
The walls of St Mary's Church, Reigate are constructed from Reigate Stone. (Note that the tower is made from darker Bath stone.)

Reigate Stone is a freestone that was mined from the Upper Greensand in north east Surrey. It was used in building work throughout the Middle Ages and early modern period. It is sometimes classified as a calcareous sandstone, although very little of the silica content is in the form of detrital sand grains. In addition to silicon dioxide, the stone also includes clay, fine-grained calcite, mica flakes and glauconite.

Since exposure of Upper Greensand is rare, Reigate Stone was generally extracted from underground workings, although it may have been quarried from the surface at first. The stone was mined using the post-and-stall technique, in which adits (approximately 4 m (13 ft) wide and 1.5 m (5 ft) high) were cut into the beds, which dip downwards below the chalk above. Parallel grooves in the floors of these workings suggest that cut stone was brought to the surface on wooden sledges. Mines are thought to have existed along the base of the North Downs from Buckland in the west to Chaldon in the east. Many probable sites were most likely destroyed by the construction of the M25 motorway, although the earliest recorded mine has been identified at the foot of Colley Hill to the north of Reigate.

== Use ==
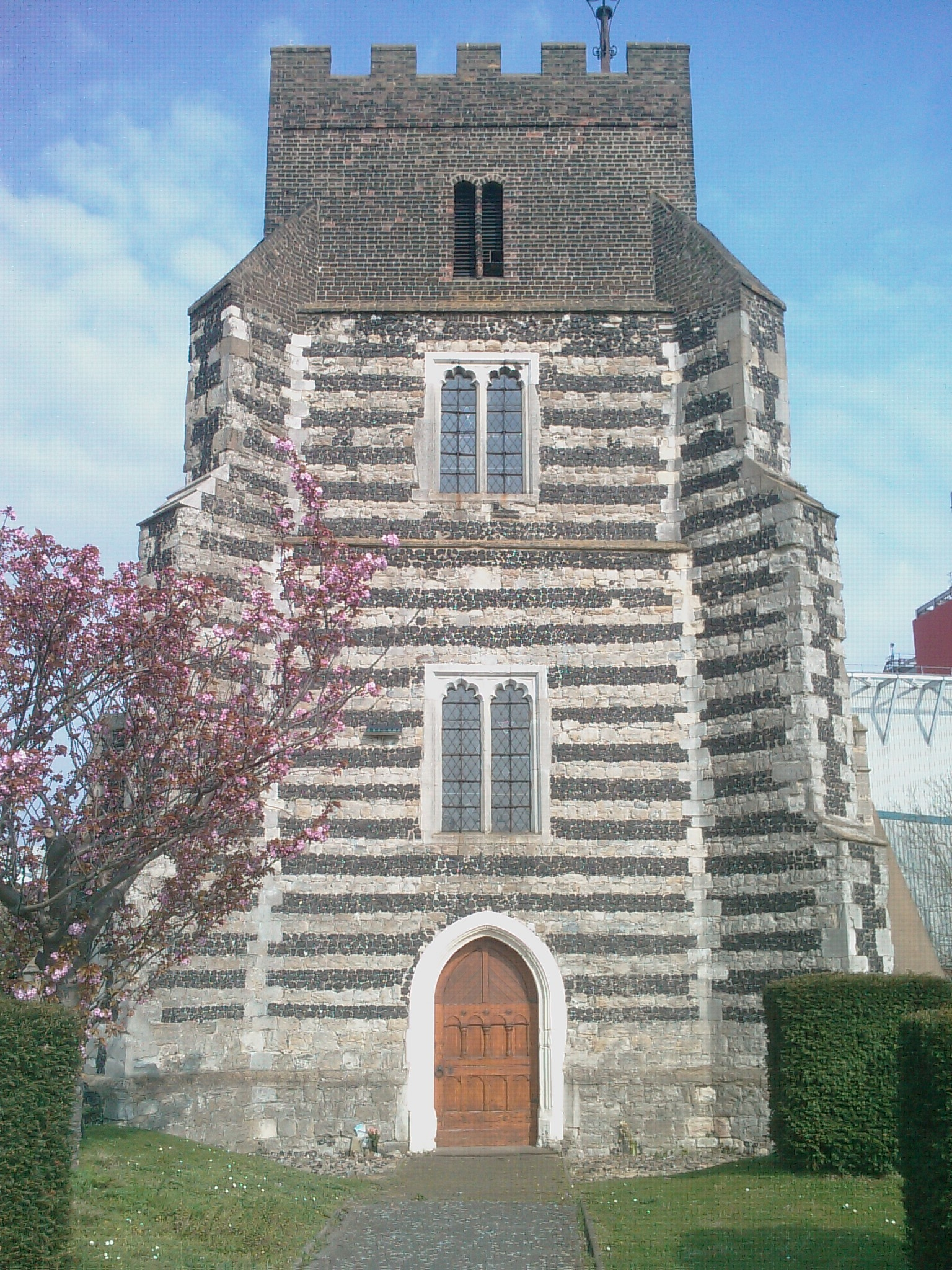
The walls of the tower of St Clement's Church, West Thurrock are constructed from alternate bands of Reigate Stone and knapped flint.

The first recorded use of Reigate Stone is in the foundations of Edward the Confessor's monastery at Westminster in the first half of the 11th century, although archaeological evidence from St Mary's Church, Stoke d'Abernon suggests that it was being quarried by the early eighth century. The stone is found in numerous medieval buildings in London, including the White Tower of the Tower of London, and Hampton Court Palace, as well as other important buildings in south east England such as Waltham Abbey, Windsor Castle and both Rochester and Canterbury Cathedrals. It was used increasingly in place of Caen stone, especially after the loss of the Duchy of Normandy by King John in 1204.

In the Tudor period, Reigate Stone was used in the construction of Nonsuch Palace, although much of it came from the demolition of Merton Priory and only a small portion was freshly mined. The stone continued to be used in the 17th century, including by Christopher Wren in St Paul's Cathedral and other city churches, following the Great Fire of London. Wren was particularly concerned to make sure that the stone was properly sourced, having identified its susceptibility to frost damage. In later centuries, Reigate Stone appears to have been particularly vulnerable to damage by pollution. The final mine closed in the 1960s, although fresh stone was procured for a new stairwell at Westminster Abbey in 2018.

== See also ==
- Bargate stone - quarried from the Lower Greensand Group in south west Surrey
- Clunch - formerly quarried from the Grey Chalk Subgroup of the North Downs
- Horsham Stone - a calcareous sandstone quarried at Horsham, West Sussex
