= Estate map =

An estate map of 1587 showing lands belonging to the Duke of Beaufort in and around Tretower, Brecknockshire. National Library of Wales, Badminton estate map volume 3, fols 68v & 69r. This map was awarded UNESCO Memory of the World status in 2016

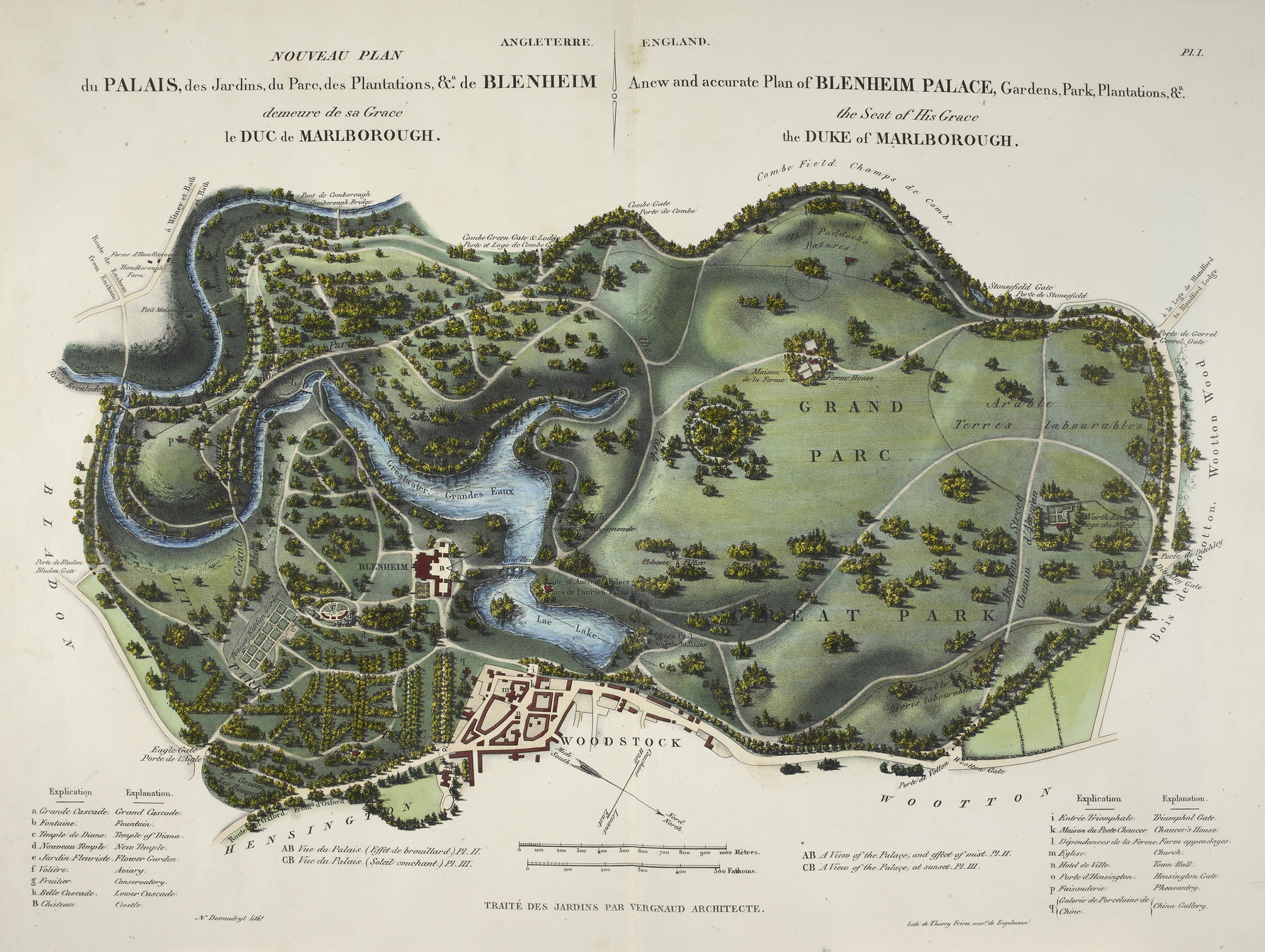
An 1835 printed map of the landscaped parkland at Blenheim Palace, Oxfordshire, England.

Estate maps were maps commissioned by individual landowners or institutions, to show their extensive landed property, typically including fields, parkland and buildings. They were used for display and estate management and were fashionable from the 16th to the 19th century.

== History ==
In England and Wales, estate maps began to be produced in large numbers during the 16th century. The availability of new estates as a result of the Dissolution of the Monasteries gave increased impetus to their production. Estate maps continued in popularity until the middle of the 19th century, when large scale tithe and Ordnance Survey maps became available. The decline of many country estates led to the dismantling of many of the traditional landed estates in the early to mid 20th century.

A few maps were drawn prior to the 16th century, but these were ad hoc, for a particular purpose. Before the emergence of the estate map, manors and other estates were usually managed using written documents listing the buildings, fields and tenants. These were known variously as surveys, rentals and extents. Despite the adoption of estate maps, the use of mapless surveys continued, although it gradually declined. The surveyor who measured the land for the map could typically survey 20 acres (8.1 ha) per day and was paid 6d per acre.

== Format ==
Estate maps were colourful and often intended for display as well as estate management. "They were drawn and decorated by country surveyors for the information and pleasure of country squires." The choice of scale was down to the individual map maker, but were usually large scale. Buildings (and trees) were often shown as miniature pictures (in what is sometimes termed a "bird's-flight view") in early maps, although from the 18th century it became common to depict buildings in plan. "Few land surveyors even attempted to show relief; it was not essential to their purpose of recording boundaries and areas". They often had elaborate cartouches giving the name of the estate owner. Typically, little or no detail is shown for land not owned by the person or organisation commissioning the map. Estate maps were frequently accompanied by field books that contained the key to symbols on the map and had information about tenants and crops. Where the field book has not survived, the usefulness of the map is greatly diminished.

== Location ==
Large numbers of estate maps are found in county record offices, having been deposited with the accumulated documents of a landed family. Where the estate owner was a corporate body – an Oxbridge college or a City livery company, for example – their estate maps remain in their own archives. Some estate maps are held in The National Archives – for example where the estate was owned by the Crown, or when it has been the subject of a court case.

== Usage ==
Originally, estate maps served two purposes. They were a tool that enabled estate owners to manage and improve their property. In addition they were status symbols that enabled a landowner to display the extent of his property ownership and his authority over his property. Surveying texts became explicit about the need to decorate the maps in a way that emphasised the status of the owner – by the use of coats of arms or depiction of the manor house.

Today, estate maps can be used to investigate land usage and changes in river channels, as well as in historic garden conservation and other historical interest in English country houses. An estate map is often useful in determining the history of field systems, as it can be the earliest written evidence of the field system in use in a locality.
