= Biggin, Essex =

Hamlet in Essex, England

Coordinates: 51.4747°N 0.3747°E

Biggin
- Location within Essex
- OS grid reference: TQ6777
- Unitary authority: Thurrock
- Shire county: Essex
- Region: East
- Country: England
- Sovereign state: United Kingdom
- Police: Essex
- Fire: Essex
- Ambulance: East of England
- UK Parliament: Thurrock

Biggin is a hamlet and manor in Chadwell St Mary, part of the borough of Thurrock, in the ceremonial county of Essex, England. It is about 2 miles (3.2 km) north of the town of Tilbury and a similar distance east of Grays.

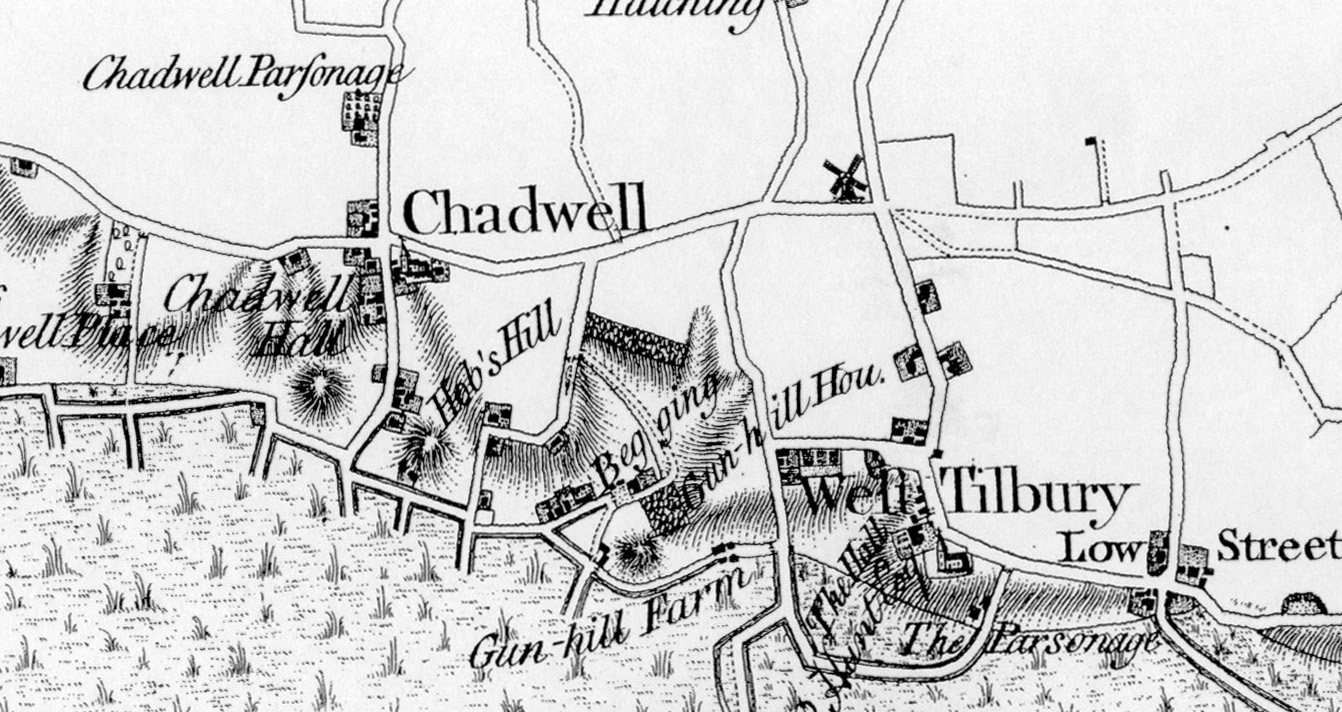
Biggin on the 1777 Chapman & Andre map of Essex

The name can be spelled Byggin, Bigging or Begging. In some sources it is called Little Biggin.

From the 13th century until the dissolution, the manor was owned by the Cistercian Abbey of Stratford Langethorne. The manor was then granted to the Dean and Chapter of St Paul's Cathedral.

For transport there is the A126 road, the A1089 road and the B149 road nearby. The nearest railway station is Tilbury Town railway station.

== Manorial Documents ==
Two court rolls covering the period 1704 - 1724 are held at the Essex Record Office.
