= Jack Petchey Foundation =

The Jack Petchey Foundation is a charitable foundation based in the United Kingdom. The charity was founded in 1999 by businessman Sir Jack Petchey. Since the charity's founding, Petchey invested over £110 million in youth projects across London and Essex. The Foundation exists to raise the aspirations of young people, to help them take advantage of opportunities and play a full part in society.

== Activities ==
The Foundation sponsored "Vlogstar Challenge", a competition run by Media Trust, which aimed to inspire 16–25 year olds in London and Essex to create video blogs (or vlogs) to share their views on issues they are passionate about. The competition attracted around 1,500 entries.

The foundation organises a "Speak Out Challenge" operating in most secondary schools in London and Essex, the program provides training in public speaking to nearly 17,000 young people each year. there are 3 rounds the workshop round where 5 out of the original 30 go to the school final then only 1 goose, then to the regional final and finally the n

The foundation runs a "Step Into Dance" programme to helps young people in some 200 schools to develop dancing skills.

=== Funded organisations ===
A number of schools and youth organisations have received funding from the Jack Petchey Foundation:

- The Girl Guides in Croydon

== Funding ==
Funding for the foundation comes from the profits of Jack Petchey. The businessman donates some £7 million a year to the foundation.
