= Orsett Hall =

Building in Essex, England

Coordinates: 51.51289°N 0.36165°E

Orsett Hall was a 17th-century Grade II listed building in Orsett, Essex (de-listed on 10 March 2008). It was set in 12 acres (4.9 ha) of parkland and was the centre of the Orsett Hall agricultural estate. The house was destroyed by fire on 11 May 2007 and rebuilt in the same style and on the same footprint as the original building in 2009.

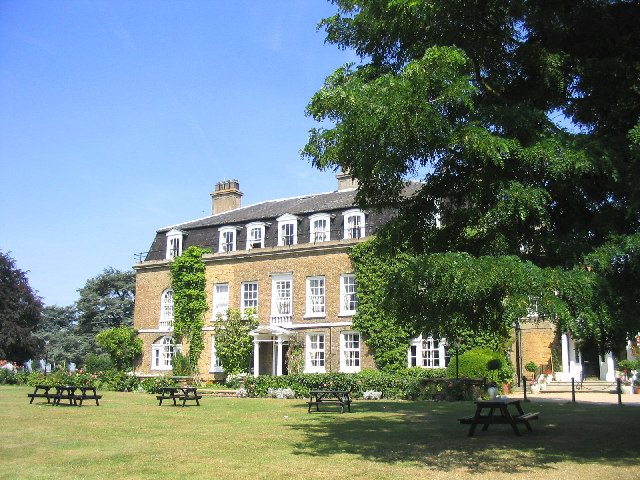
Orsett Hall before the fire, by John Winfield

== History ==
The house dated in part to the 17th century, but was enlarged and reconstructed in brick by Richard Baker about 1750 and was set in 12 acres (4.9 ha) of parkland. With the purchases of additional farm land in Orsett and nearby parishes, Baker established an agricultural estate centred on the house. In 1827, the house and estate passed from the Baker family to a nephew, William Wingfield, who changed his name to Wingfield-Baker. It was inherited by his son, Richard Baker Wingfield-Baker and in turn by his son, Digby Wingfield-Baker. At the end of the 19th century the estate was inherited by Thomas Whitmore as a debt of honour. (A family legend says that it was won in a game of cards.) The house was refurbished in the early 20th century by Colonel Sir Francis Whitmore who described it as "an uninhabitable shell, without light, water or sanitation". It was the Whitmore family home for more than fifty years. It was inherited by Sir Francis' son, Sir John Whitmore, who used the grounds to take off and land his plane. He sold it in 1968, to his friends, Tony and Val Morgan. At the time of the fire Steve and Lynn Haynes owned and ran the Orsett Hall Hotel as a conference centre, hotel and wedding venue.

== The fire ==
The last event held at the Orsett Hall was Chafford Hundred Campus' School Prom, held on 10 May 2007. Only a few hours after they left the building, it caught alight and collapsed. The fire broke out in the kitchen while breakfast was being prepared and spread rapidly. Guests were evacuated and no one was seriously hurt. More than 70 Essex firefighters and crews attended, including two fire engines from Orsett, two from Grays, two from Basildon including an aerial ladder platform, one from Southend, and a Fire Brigade Command Unit from Brentwood. The building collapsed at around midday.

The house contained antique furniture and Sir Francis' ceremonial uniform as well as photographs and documents relating to the history of the house and Whitmore family. There were numerous paintings, including many family portraits that displayed the characteristic family trait - a "prominent nose". Nothing was saved. Prior to the fire, documents from the Orsett Estate during the 19th and 20th centuries had been deposited in the Museum of English Rural Life at Reading. There are some other documents related to Orsett Hall in the Essex Record Office.

Following the fire, the building was de-listed on 10 March 2008.

== Rebuilding ==
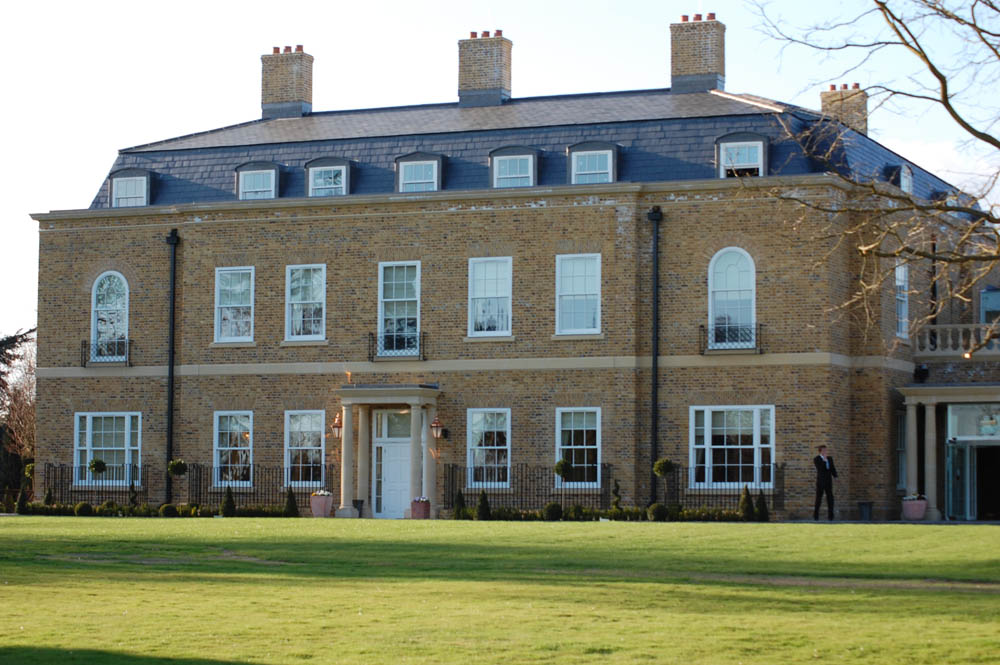
The rebuilt Orsett Hall in a similar style to the original

The owners took the decision to rebuild in the same style and on the same footprint as the original building. Building work was completed early in 2009.
