= Orsett =

Village in Essex, England

Coordinates: 51.51°N 0.37°E

- Village
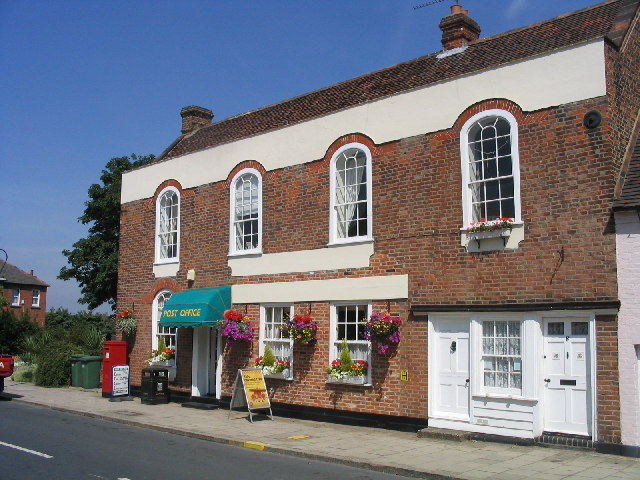
- Village post office

- Location within Essex
- Population: 1,461 (Built up area, 2021)
- OS grid reference: TQ645815
- Unitary authority: Thurrock
- Ceremonial county: Essex
- Region: East
- Country: England
- Sovereign state: United Kingdom
- Post town: GRAYS
- Postcode district: RM16
- Dialling code: 01375
- Police: Essex
- Fire: Essex
- Ambulance: East of England
- UK Parliament: South Basildon and East Thurrock

Orsett is a village in the borough of Thurrock in Essex, England. It lies 3 miles (5 km) north-east of the centre of Grays, its post town. At the 2021 census the Orsett built up area had a population of 1,461.

Orsett was an ancient parish. It was abolished as a civil parish in 1936 on the creation of Thurrock Urban District, which in turn became the modern borough of Thurrock in 1974. The parish has also been merged for ecclesiastical purposes with the neighbouring parishes of Bulphan and Horndon-on-the-Hill.

== History ==
In the Domesday Book of 1086, two estates or manors were listed at the vill of Orseda or Dorseda in the Barstable Hundred of Essex. A priest is mentioned in Domesday Book, suggesting Orsett was already a parish by that time. The current parish church, dedicated to St Giles and All Saints, dates back to the 12th century.

It has historically been a primarily agricultural community situated at the southern edge of the old ice age flood plain traversed by the river Mardyke.

Orsett contains a ring and bailey earthwork known locally as Bishop Bonner's palace; so called as it was the residence of the Bishops of London, including Bishop Edmund Bonner from 1553 to 1559. On the gravel terrace, there is a Neolithic causewayed enclosure discovered as a result of crop marks which showed on aerial photographs taken by Kenneth St Joseph of Cambridge University. It has three concentric ditches with a number of breaks or causeways. The enclosure was used as a burial ground by the Saxons and contained at least three barrows visible on the aerial photo.

On the junction of Pound Lane and High Road is the village lock-up, removed in the mid 19th century but restored in the mid 20th century, the lockup or cage was built in the late 17th or early 18th century. It has barred windows and a plank door with heavy hinges. Before a national system of policing was set up many villages had their own lock-up. Petty criminals were held for a short time before being released or sent to a larger town for trial.

Orsett Heath in the south of the parish was formerly part of an extensive area of heathland that included Terrel's Heath.

=== Administrative history ===
Orsett was an ancient parish in the Barstable Hundred of Essex. In 1835, the Orsett Poor Law Union was established, being a group of 18 parishes which collectively delivered their responsibilities under the poor laws. A workhouse to serve the union was built in 1837 on Rowley Road in Orsett.

When elected parish and district councils were established in 1894, Orsett was included in the Orsett Rural District, which was based on the existing poor law union. The rural district council met at the workhouse in Orsett, but had its offices in the nearby town of Grays. The workhouse later became Orsett Hospital, which was completely rebuilt in the 1960s.

The civil parish and rural district were both abolished in 1936 on the creation of the new Thurrock Urban District. At the 1931 census (the last before its abolition), the civil parish of Orsett had a population of 1,771.

The parish of Orsett has also been abolished for ecclesiastical purposes, merging with Bulphan and Horndon-on-the-Hill to form a Church of England ecclesiastical parish called "Horndon, Orsett and Bulphan".

== Geography ==
The centre of Orsett is aligned on an east–west axis along the High Road, on which is the parish church of St Giles and All Saints along with the animal pound and lock-up opposite Rowley Road. Its former workhouse on Rowley Road was developed into a large modern hospital in the 1960s but has, since the 1980s, been reduced in size once again. Most of the former shops in the High Road, including the Post Office opposite the Church and the blacksmith's in Rowley Road, have closed to be replaced by just one convenience store which contains a sub post office.

Two public houses have survived in the centre of the village, one being the prize-winning Whitmore Arms, the other the Foxhound, and outside the village centre Orsett has one additional pub – The Kings Arms.

== Education ==
The village's primary school has been located since the mid-19th century in School Lane, educating children up to the age of 14 until 1944 and to 11 thereafter.

== Buildings ==
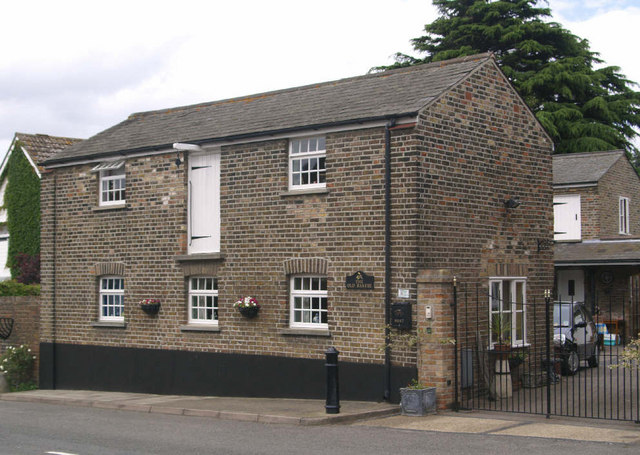
The Old Bakery on east side of Rectory Road

Orsett has a variety of listed and interesting buildings, including the almost perfectly preserved Victorian workmen's cottages on Maltings Lane as well as several Grade Two listed timber-framed and thatched houses, and grand houses dating from the reign of Charles II.

Apart from some small-scale Council housing in Ridgewell Avenue to the North of the High Street, there was no significant growth in residential development until 1954–55 when new properties were erected in School Lane. These were followed by further developments on the former site of the Anglican Rectory (known as Herga Hyll following its sale), off Rectory and Conways Roads and off Rowley Road. During the late 1980s and throughout the 1990s, a new housing estate was built on land that belonged to the old container site, and some of the ex-military Orsett Camp site, between Stanford Road and Orsett Golf Course.

Most of the former hospital site has been re-developed as housing in the last five years. The redevelopment provided 200 houses, despite being within the green belt and avoided the need to provide affordable housing on the site.

Opposite the Old Bakery, on the west side of Rectory Road, is Orsett Masonic Hall which is home to Orsett Masonic Lodge.

The historic Orsett Hall on Prince Charles's Avenue, the home of the Whitmore family until their estate was sold in the late-1960s, was destroyed by fire in May 2007 but was rebuilt during 2008–09. The exterior design is in keeping with the original Georgian building. It was used for a Help for Heroes charity event on 11 April 2010. Orsett House is an early-eighteenth-century house off the High Street and on the western edge of the village.

It has a well-equipped village hall at its western end and a centre for the churches in the High Street.

== Sport ==
Orsett is home to a cricket club. It has one tennis court and a bowling green.

== Governance ==
There is one tier of local government covering Orsett, at unitary authority level: Thurrock Council. One of the wards of Thurrock is called Orsett, which also includes the villages of Bulphan and Horndon-on-the-Hill and surrounding rural areas as well as Orsett village itself.
