= Essex County Fire and Rescue Service =

Regional fire and rescue service in England

Operational area
- Country: England
- County: Essex
- Address: Kelvedon Park, Witham

Agency overview
- Established: 1 April 1948; 77 years ago
- Annual calls: ~14,000 incidents
- Employees: 1,448
- Annual budget: £70.1 million
- Chief Fire Officer: Rick Hylton

Facilities and equipment
- Stations: 50

Website
- www.essex-fire.gov.uk

Essex County Fire and Rescue Service (ECFRS) is the statutory fire and rescue service for the county of Essex in the east of England, and is one of the largest fire services in the country, covering an area of 1,338 square miles (3,470 km^{2}) and a population of over 1.7 million people.

In 2015, the service attended around 14,000 emergency incidents within the year, mostly fires and road traffic collisions (RTC). Additionally, lift releases, effecting entry into buildings, flooding incidents and animal rescues are also incidents dealt with by ECFRS. However, around 40 percent of these incidents are false alarms and require no further action. Between 2004 and 2014, the number of incidents attended by ECFRS decreased significantly by around 50 percent, with around 38 calls per day, compared to around 77 calls per day in 2004.

ECFRS employs 1,448 staff: 620 full-time firefighters, 519 retained firefighters, 33 control personnel and 240 support staff.

There are 50 fire stations in Essex, 12 of which are crewed by wholetime firefighters, or by wholetime and retained firefighters, and are generally located in the more densely populated areas. The remaining 38 stations are staffed by retained firefighters, and tend to be found in smaller towns and villages. Essex used to operate four day-crewed fire stations, located at Dovercourt (Harwich), South Woodham Ferrers, Great Baddow and Waltham Abbey, but, following a 2016 consultation, these have been changed to retained-only status. ECFRS has 66 pumping appliances and 27 specialist appliances within its frontline operational fleet.

Major risks covered include Stansted and Southend airport, Harwich seaport, Lakeside shopping centre, Tilbury Docks, London Gateway, part of the M25 and M11 motorways, A127 and A12 road and 13 top-tier COMAH sites.

As well as attending fires, traffic collisions and other rescue operations, ECFRS provides emergency response to hazardous materials incidents and has an Urban Search and Rescue (USAR) team of officers with specialist training and equipment to conduct rescues from collapsed buildings and enclosed spaces. The USAR team has its own fire station separate from others across the county, ECFRS being the first to do this in the country. One of their resources include a search dog trained to locate people trapped in rubble. Another primary role of the service is preventive community safety work; in 2010, ECFRS fitted over 7,000 smoke alarms in houses across the county.

== Organisation ==
ECFRS headquarters is located in Kelvedon. The service is divided into four Groups:

- North East Group
- North West Group
- South East Group
- South West Group

The Chief Fire Officer/Chief Executive is Rick Hylton

On 1 October 2017, governance of ECFRS was transferred from the Essex Fire Authority (EFA) to the Police, Fire and Crime Commissioner (PFCC), Roger Hirst. It was made clear, that both Essex Police and ECFRS would retain their Chief Officers, however the new PFCC would have overlying governance over the two, and the Chief Officers would answer to the PFCC. Essex were the first to do this in the country.

The Emergency Operational Fire Control is situated in the headquarters at Kelvedon. 33 control staff handle over 14,000 999 emergency calls. The control staff also carry out incident co-ordination, appliance mobilisation and movements to ensure strategic fire cover. Radio communications are made between incidents and Fire Control, and control staff liaise with other emergency services to provide additional resources when requested by firefighting personnel. Emergency calls are handled on an average of 54 seconds from the time of answering the call, to the time of dispatching the fire crew(s).

There are five firefighter training centres, located in Basildon, Chelmsford, Orsett, Witham and Wethersfield. Each of these centres specialise in different forms of training firefighters must become accustomed to, in order to be operationally prepared.

The service workshop is in Lexden, Colchester, where the operational fleet of frontline fire appliances and specialist appliances are maintained, and the reserve fleet of spare appliances are stored.

In 2016, the service started a co-responding scheme with the East of England Ambulance Service, whereby fire crews would respond to life-threatening cardiac emergencies, alongside ambulances, in a way to ease pressure off the ambulance service, and grant better survival for patients. Fire Stations that partook in the scheme were: Basildon, Frinton, Ongar, Newport, Coggeshall and Colchester. However, in 2017, the co-responding scheme ceased due to disputes between the union and the service. Regardless, the service still have close relations with the ambulance service, and on a daily basis, fire crews work with partners like paramedics and police officers.

== Roles ==
In 2016, it was announced that the service would change its rank based structure, to a role based structure, commonly known as 'rank to role'. This process was part of the Peoples Structures Project in the 2016–2020 Essex County Fire and Rescue Service report. This new role based structure is popular among many fire services in the country, and suits the modern and flexible requirement of a fire service. This process did not hugely effect the staff and their roles, however did require changes to some Sub Officer's (Watch Manager's) based station of work, in order for the process to be implemented. The service was one of the last organisations to implement 'rank to role'.

== Performance ==
In 2010, the service responded to the scene within an average of 8 minutes 56 seconds (10-minute target), and 93% within 15 minutes (90% target).

In 2014, the service responded to the scene within an average of 9 minutes 10 seconds (10-minute target), and 91% within 15 minutes (90% target).

When the control operator receives an emergency call, the average time it took to identify the emergency and allocate the right resources was between 70 and 80 seconds. For wholetime crews, a turnout took on average 2 minutes to be ready for mobilisation. For on-call crews, a turnout took on average 4 minutes 30 seconds to be ready for mobilisation.

Every fire and rescue service in England and Wales is periodically subjected to a statutory inspection by His Majesty's Inspectorate of Constabulary and Fire & Rescue Services (HMICFRS). The inspection investigates how well the service performs in each of three areas. On a scale of outstanding, good, requires improvement and inadequate, Essex Fire and Rescue Service was rated as follows:

HMICFRS Inspection Essex
Area	Rating 2018/19	Rating 2021/22	Description
Effectiveness	Requires improvement	Requires improvement	How effective is the fire and rescue service at keeping people safe and secure from fire and other risks?
Efficiency	Requires improvement	Requires improvement	How efficient is the fire and rescue service at keeping people safe and secure from fire and other risks?
People	Requires improvement	Requires improvement	How well does the fire and rescue service look after its people?

== Fire stations ==
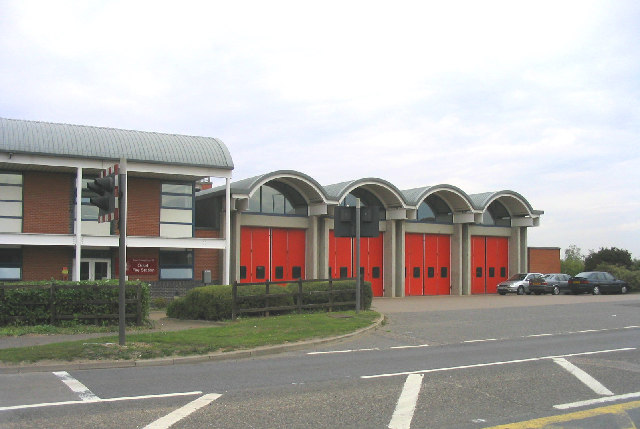
Orsett Fire Station

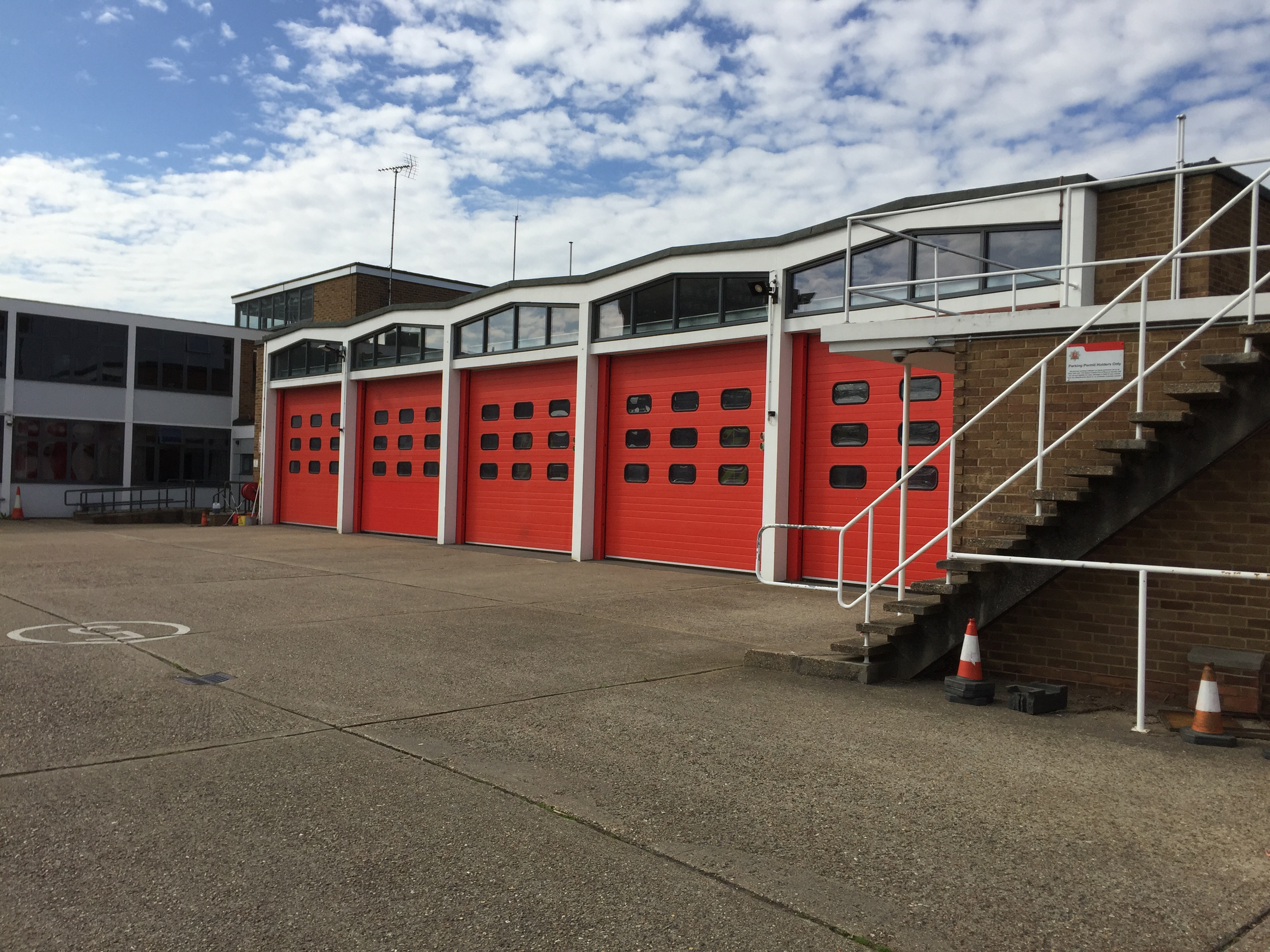
Basildon Fire Station

The service has 50 fire stations, both wholetime and retained.

Southend Fire Station is also home to the UK's first dedicated Young Firefighters' (now Fire Cadets) Centre, opened in July 2010.

== Urban Search and Rescue Team (USAR) ==
Specialist equipment, multi-purpose vehicles, a search and rescue dog and a purpose-built base staffed with a trained experienced team comprise the county's urban search and rescue (USAR) team.

The team is equipped to rescue victims trapped in the rubble of collapsed buildings, or major transport accidents, for example. They are able to locate and safely extract trapped person, and can shore up unstable buildings so that firefighters can continue with rescue operations.

The USAR team are equipped with prime movers, specialist hook-lift vehicles that can be loaded with one of five different equipment pods, depending on what situation the team are going to face. These pods include hose layers and high-volume pumps, technical rescue, timber for shoring up unstable structures, and even a multi-purpose skid loader that can access tight spaces, explore voids, and move heavy loads of debris.

Following the September 11 attacks, new risks were identified for which rescue services would need to be better prepared, and the British government responded with the announcement that USAR units were to be established throughout the country.

ECFRS was chosen as one of the 17 strategically suitable services partly because it already had 14 officers trained in urban rescue, members of the UK Fire Service Safety & Rescue Team who were part of the rescue effort that was sent to Bam in Iran after it was hit by a major earthquake in December 2003 where they helped in the search for victims amongst the ruins of the ancient city.

The station commander at Lexden, a specialist co-ordinator of search and rescue operations, was also sent with the EU Civil Protection Mechanism to Haiti in January 2010 after a major earthquake struck the country.

In February 2011, six ECFRS firefighters, including two from the USAR unit at Lexden, joined the UK's International Search and Rescue (ISAR) team sent to assist with rescue efforts in New Zealand's second city Christchurch after an earthquake hit the region.

In April 2015, six firefighters and rescue dog have been deployed to Nepal to join a team of 67 search and rescue and medical experts to help and look for earthquake survivors.

Formed in 1992, the UK's ISAR team comprises specialist search and rescue officers drawn from 13 brigades who are on call 24 hours a day. The ECFRS team's primary role is urban search and rescue but it has also trained and involved in water rescue and working at height.

== Cross-county assistance ==
ECFRS assisted in the emergency response to floods in Oxfordshire in 2007, where seven firefighters from the Swift Water Rescue team helped rescue victims trapped by the floods with a specialist fireboat.

Essex was also one of 16 brigades called in to attend the Buncefield oil depot fire near Hemel Hempstead, Hertfordshire, in December 2005. Fire appliances from Orsett, Hadleigh, Harlow, and foam appliances from Grays, Maldon and Epping assisted in operations at the largest ever blaze in peacetime Britain.

== See also ==
- Fire services in the United Kingdom
- Orsett Hall fire
- List of British firefighters killed in the line of duty

Other emergency services:

- Essex & Herts Air Ambulance
- East of England Ambulance Service
- Essex Police
