= List of pubs in the United Kingdom =

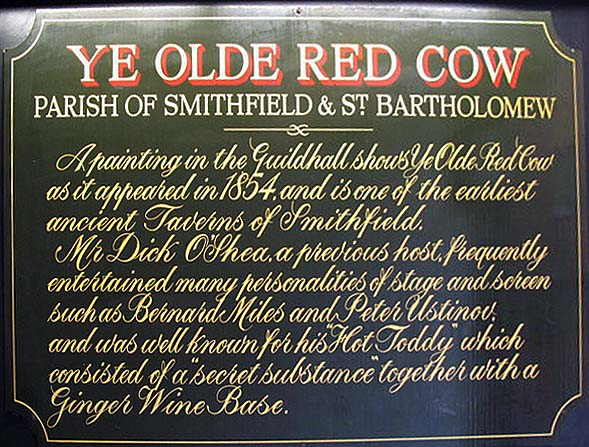
Information board about "Ye Olde Red Cow pub"

Pubs in the United Kingdom include:

== England ==
=== East Anglia ===
- The Adam and Eve, Norwich is thought to date to 1249; although the current building was only built in the 17th century.
- The Berney Arms in Norfolk may only be reached by foot, by boat or by train as there is no road access. It is served by the nearby Berney Arms railway station which likewise has no road access and serves only the pub and nearby nature reserves. The pub is adjoined by a tea room, gift shop and small store. Both the pub and shop close during the winter months.
- The Eagle in Benet Street, Cambridge. The pub in which Francis Crick and James Watson announced that they had "discovered the secret of life" (the structure of DNA). The pub is opposite the Cavendish Laboratory and the event is commemorated by a blue plaque next to the entrance. In addition, the ceiling of the back bar, known as 'The RAF Room' is covered with the signed names of Second World War pilots.
- The Nutshell, Bury St Edmunds, Suffolk. Britain's smallest pub measuring just 5 metres by 2 metres (16.5 ft by 6.5 ft), according to the Guinness Book of Records. The pub, a timber-framed Grade II listed building, has been in existence since 1867. In 1984, a record 102 people squeezed inside.
- The Old Ferryboat Inn, Holywell, Cambridge. One of a number of pubs claiming to be the oldest in England with claims of alcohol being sold on the site as far back as 560.

=== East Midlands ===
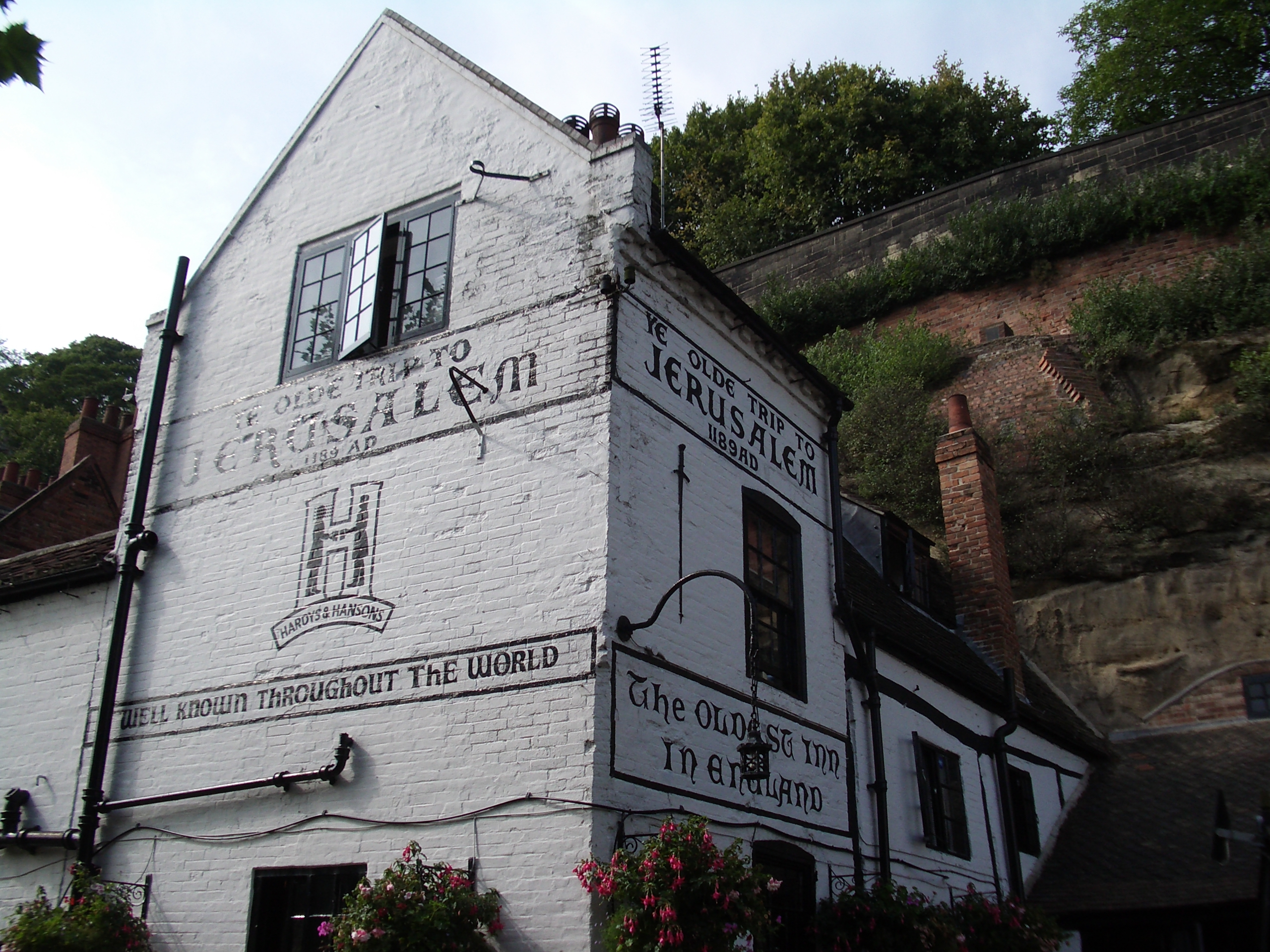
Front of Ye Olde Trip to Jerusalem

- Ye Olde Trip to Jerusalem in Nottingham. It incorporates caves under Nottingham Castle and claims to be the oldest pub in England, although the first confirmed reference to a pub on the site (called the Pilgrim) dates to 1751. The owners claim a model galleon hanging from the ceiling is cursed and the premises are haunted.
- Ye Olde Salutation Inn in Nottingham. Claims to date back to 1240 and be the second oldest pub in the United Kingdom.
- The Bell Inn in Nottingham. Has been officially dated to 1437. It has been proven to be actually older than the other two pubs, although there is some evidence that there was a Brewery on the site of the "Trip" which served the Castle above it, and which does date back to somewhere around the end of the 12th century.
- Ram Jam Inn, A1, Rutland. Named after a confidence trick performed by Dick Turpin. Demolished late 2022.

=== London ===
- The Alchemist, Battersea, a pub built in the Victorian-era and originally called The Fishmongers Arms, which closed in 2013 and was demolished in May 2015 by a property developer without permission. The property developer was later asked to rebuild the pub brick-by-brick.

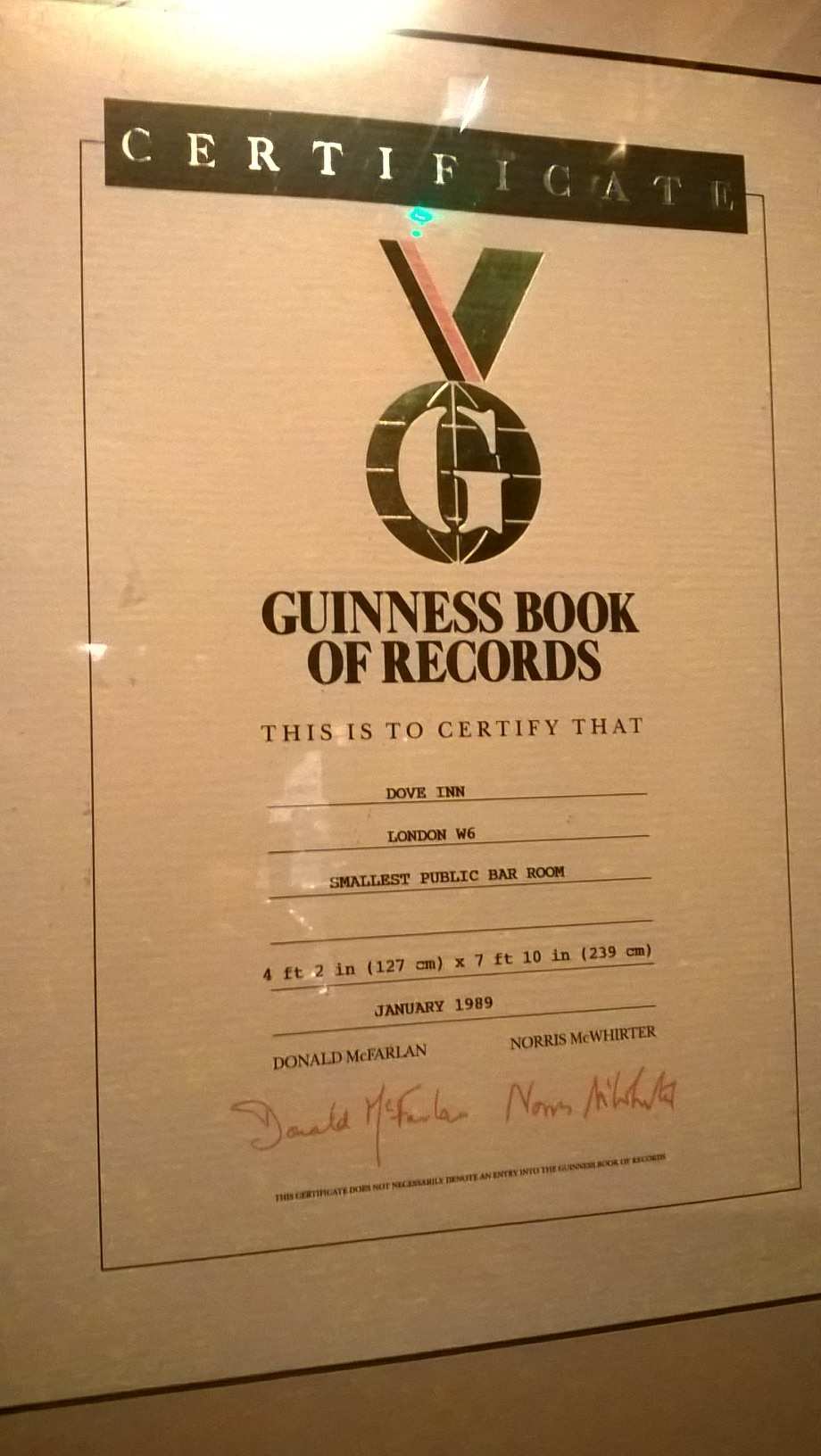
The Dove, Hammersmith, Guinness Book of Records 'Smallest Public Bar Room' Certificate (awarded in 1989)

- The Angel, Islington. Formerly a coaching inn, the first on the route northwards out of London, where Thomas Paine is believed to have written much of The Rights of Man and was mentioned by Charles Dickens in Oliver Twist. It became a Lyons Corner House, and is now a Co-operative Bank. It is also on the board in the British version of the board game Monopoly. Close by is a modern Wetherspoon pub continuing the name The Angel.
- The Blind Beggar, Whitechapel. In March 1966, Richardson Gang associate George Cornell was shot and killed by gangster Ronnie Kray in the saloon bar. William Booth, the founder of the Salvation Army, preached his first sermon outside the pub in 1865.
- The Britannia is a Grade II-listed pub at 5 Brewers Lane, Richmond.
- The Bull's Head, also known as "The Bull", is a pub in Barnes, best known as a venue for live jazz.
- The Carlton Tavern in Kilburn, a building erected by Charrington & Co in the Vernacular Revival style in 1920, to replace an earlier pub on the same site which was destroyed by a Zeppelin bomb in 1918. The building was demolished without permission by a property company in April 2015, who were later ordered by Westminster City Council to rebuild it brick-by-brick.
- Crocker's Folly, Maida Vale. Huge ornate late Victorian pub, closed 2004 but reopened October 2014, said to have been built by Frank Crocker on this site in the expectation that the Great Central Railway terminus in London would be built opposite and not in Marylebone. Known as The Crown Hotel from its opening until 1987.
- De Hems, off Shaftesbury Avenue, is the primary Dutch pub in London; it takes its name from a Dutch seaman who purchased the pub in 1890. The Dutch resistance met here during the Second World War.
- Dirty Dick's, Bishopsgate. Established in 1745 and originally called The Old Jerusalem it is named after ironmonger Nathaniel Bentley, who upon the death of his fiancée on the eve of their wedding, refused to clean, clear up anything or even wash. The pub was rebuilt from ground level in 1870.
- The Dove, Hammersmith, once the haunt of Ernest Hemingway and Graham Greene, it also claims the smallest bar in Britain (according to the Guinness Book of Records), though not the smallest pub. It also makes the disputed claim to be the oldest surviving Thames-side pub.

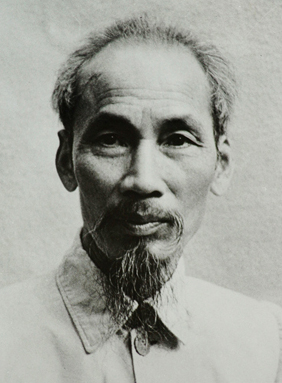
Former Vietnamese leader Ho Chi Minh worked in the kitchen at The Drayton Court in Ealing

- The Drayton Court in Ealing. Built in 1893 as a hotel, it was converted to pub use in the 1940s. Former Vietnamese leader Ho Chi Minh worked in the kitchens in 1914.

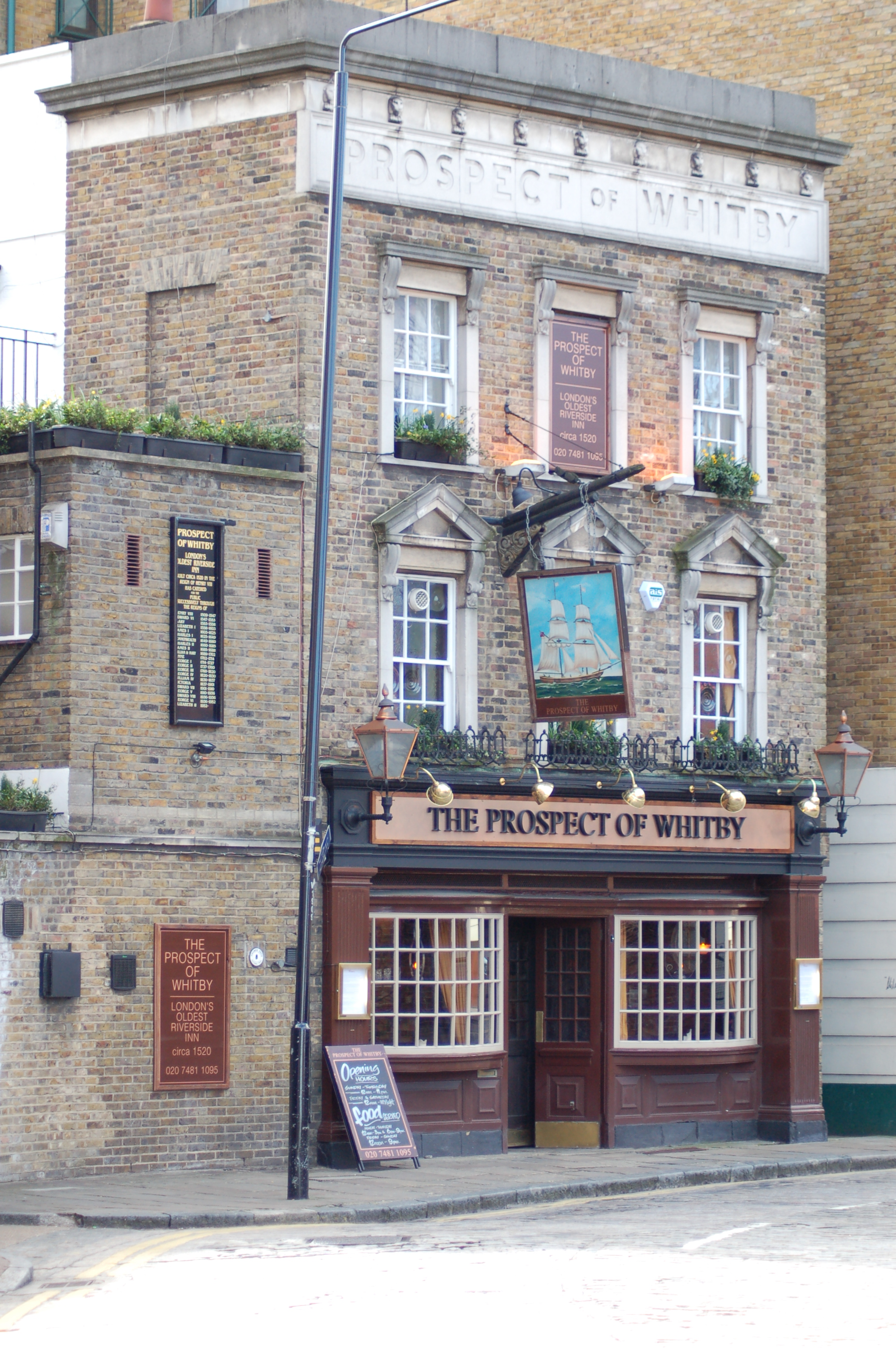
The Prospect of Whitby, street view

- The Feathers, Linhope Street, Marylebone. A pub since 1899 it is claimed to be the smallest in London, with only three tables and a small bar. It changed name to The Swan & Edgar and closed in 2013.
- The Finborough Arms was built in 1868 to a design by George Godwin. It was one of five public houses built by Corbett and McClymont in the Earls Court district during the West London development boom of the 1860s. The upstairs room hosts a leading fringe theatre. Renowned plumber Thomas Crapper is a famous former patron.
- Fitzroy Tavern, Fitzrovia. Famous for being frequented by Virginia Woolf and others of the Bloomsbury Set. It also boasted Dylan Thomas, George Orwell and George Bernard Shaw as regulars.
- The George Inn, Southwark off Borough High Street is London's only remaining galleried coaching inn. Dating from the 17th century (the original building was destroyed by fire in 1676) it is famous for have been visited by Charles Dickens (it appears in the serial novel Little Dorrit) and William Shakespeare, although there is little evidence that the latter ever visited.
- The Grapes, Limehouse, on Narrow Street, Limehouse. Originally The Bunch of Grapes, this pub has stood for over 500 years and is immortalised as the Six Jolly Fellowship Porters in Charles Dickens' novel, Our Mutual Friend (though some commentators claim that Dickens amalgamated descriptions of several waterside taverns). The current licence holder is actor Sir Ian McKellen.
- The Grapes, Wandsworth, a Grade II listed pub in Fairfield Street, Wandsworth.
- The Grenadier, Belgravia. The building dates to 1720 when it was originally constructed as an officers' mess for the 1st Regiment of Foot Guards and became a public house in 1818 with the name The Guardsman. Said to be haunted by a young grenadier who was beaten to death after being caught cheating at cards.
- The Hare and Hounds is a Grade II-listed early 19th century pub at Upper Richmond Road, East Sheen.
- King's Head, Upper Street, Islington has an on-site theatre that charges for drinks in pre-decimal currency.
- The Lamb, Bloomsbury, Lamb's Conduit Street, Holborn. A grade II listed building dating from the 1720s, it retains its Victorian-era 'snob screens' which would have been erected to protect the well-to-do in the saloon bar from being seen by the common folk in the public bar.
- The Magdala Tavern, on South Hill Park, Hampstead. It was the first building in this road and existed in 1868, being named after the British victory in the Battle of Magdala in the same year. Ruth Ellis, the last woman to be hanged in the UK, shot and killed her lover outside the pub in 1955.
- The Old Queens Head, Essex Road, Islington. Said to have been frequented by Vladimir Lenin during his time in the capital. It is also said to be haunted by the ghosts of a woman and a girl, who appear on the first Sunday of each month.
- The Old Ship is a Grade II-listed 18th century pub at 82 George Street, Richmond.
- The Princess Louise, High Holborn notable for its rare, preserved and listed interior. It is owned by the Samuel Smith Old Brewery.
- The Prospect of Whitby, Wapping. Said to be London's oldest riverside pub, dating back to around 1520. Originally known as The Devil's Tavern, it changed name in 1777 to The Prospect of Whitby, after a ship that transported coal from Newcastle to London that moored nearby. Judge Jeffreys is said to have dined and drank here in the 17th century.
- The Red Lion, St John Street, Islington. Old public house-cum-theatre where, it is claimed, Thomas Paine wrote parts of Rights of Man.
- The Sherlock Holmes, a theme pub on Northumberland Street, based on the fictional detective Sherlock Holmes which displays the artefacts and memorabilia purchased by Whitbread & Co. in 1957 which were created for the Festival of Britain. The pub was originally known as The Northumberland Arms.
- Spaniards Inn, Hampstead. A listed building built in 1585, it is said to take its name from two of its former owners – Spaniards Juan and Francisco Porero. Dick Turpin's father is also said to have held the licence. It is reputedly haunted by three ghosts; a former owner, a woman in white and Turpin himself.
- Sun in the Sands, believed to be a stopping point of Henry VIII when riding from Greenwich to Shooter's Hill with the Queen, Catherine of Aragon.
- The Sun Inn, a mid-18th century Grade II-listed pub overlooking the village pond at 7 Church Road, Barnes.
- The White Cross, an early/mid-19th century Grade II-listed pub at Riverside, Richmond.
- The White Hart on the corner of Drury Lane and High Holborn. Claims to be the oldest licensed pub in London; Old Bailey archives date it back to 1216.
- The Winchester in Highgate, north London. Built in 1881 as The Winchester Tavern, it later became The Winchester Hall Hotel. The name derives from a nearby 17th century mansion, Winchester Hall. The pub is listed on Camra's National Inventory of Historic Pub Interiors.
- Ye Olde Cheshire Cheese in Fleet Street. Rebuilt in 1667 from an original tavern, destroyed by The Great Fire of London, it is reputedly a former haunt of Samuel Johnson, Dickens, and Sir Arthur Conan Doyle.

=== North East England ===
- Marsden Grotto, currently the only pub in Europe that is built on a sea-cliff face and partially into sea-cliff caves.
- The Fisher's Arms, Horncliffe, Northumberland is believed to be the most Northerley village pub in England.

=== North West England ===
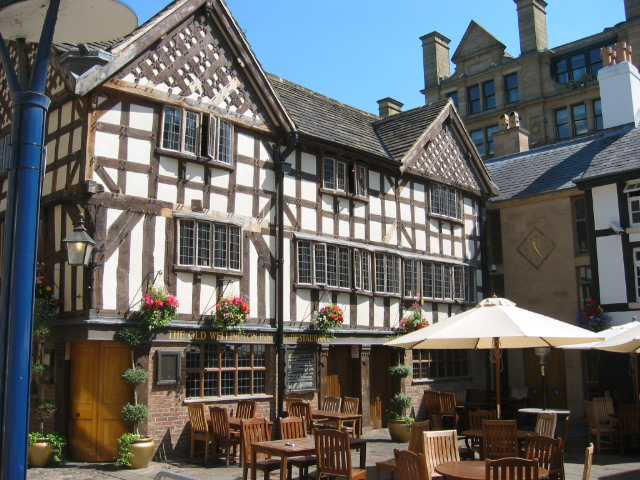
The Old Wellington Inn, Manchester

- The White Lion Inn, Barthomley, built in 1614 in the ancient parish and village of Barthomley in Cheshire this historic pub is situated in a place of great beauty with an intriguing history.
- The Philharmonic Dining Rooms, Liverpool ('The Phil'). Grade II listed Victorian pub with Art Deco lighting and mosaic floor and bar. Once much favoured by the Liverpool Poets.
- The Scotch Piper, Lydiate, Merseyside is the oldest Pub in the traditional county of Lancashire dates from 1320.
- The Cat and Fiddle Inn in Cheshire is the second-highest inn or public house in England.
- Ye Olde Man and Scythe is one of the oldest pubs in the country, and the oldest in Bolton, dating back to 1251
- The Moon Under Water, Deansgate, Manchester, a Wetherspoons house, is the largest in the country
- The Old Wellington Inn, Shambles Square, Manchester. The birthplace of the writer John Byrom and along with its neighbour, Sinclair's Oyster Bar, probably one of the only two pubs in the world to have been physically moved twice. They were both raised 4 ft 9 inches in the 1970s to be incorporated into a redevelopment and then dismantled and re-erected in a new location after the IRA 1996 Manchester bombing.
- Boot Inn, Chester, The Boot Inn was built in the early to middle part of the 17th century, opening as an inn in 1643. Its façade was rebuilt and restored in the late 19th century.
- Bear and Billet, Chester the pub was originally a house that was built in 1664 as the town house of the Earls of Shrewsbury who held control of the nearby Bridgegate.
- Old King's Head Hotel, Chester, The building was constructed in about 1208.It was the town house for Peter the Clerk, the administrator of Chester Castle.
- Old Custom House Inn, Chester, The inn originated from two former houses, their undercrofts now forming the inn's cellars. The older house, on the east side, is dated 1637.
- The Falcon, Chester, The building originated as a house in about 1200 and was later extended to the south along Lower Bridge Street, with a great hall running parallel to the street.
- Town Crier public house, Chester was built in 1865 as a hotel.
- Telford's Warehouse, The building was constructed in about 1790, and designed by Thomas Telford.
- Bear's Paw Hotel, Frodsham, According to the date on the lintel over the front door, the Bear's Paw was constructed in 1632.
- Old Hall Hotel, Sandbach, is a public house and restaurant in High Street, Sandbach, Cheshire, England. It was built in 1656 on the site of a previous manor house.

=== South East England ===
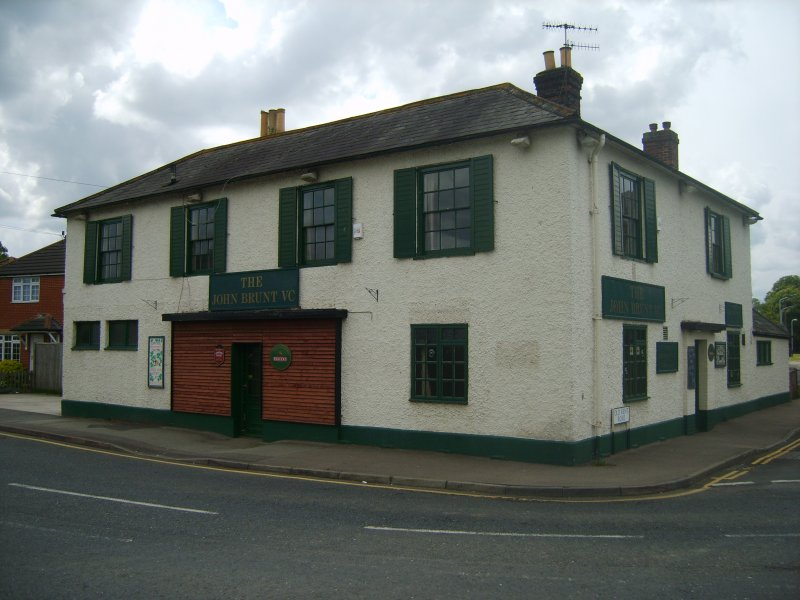
The John Brunt V.C.

- The King's Head, Aylesbury, a late medieval courtyard inn, and one of some thirty or more pubs in England run by the National Trust.
- The Stag Inn, Hastings, East Sussex.
- The Hand & Flowers in Marlow, Buckinghamshire, a gastropub on West Street owned by chef Tom Kerridge which became the first in the UK to hold two Michelin stars.
- The John Brunt V.C., Paddock Wood, Kent is one of only three pubs in the country to be named after a holder of the Victoria Cross; the other two are the Leefe Robinson in Harrow Weald and the Albert Herring, in Palmers Green, London. The name was changed from The Kent Arms in 1947.
- The Seven Stars Inn, Robertsbridge, East Sussex, oldest pub in the Harveys Brewery stable, built in the 14th century on the main road north of Hastings, and said to be haunted.
- Ye Olde Fighting Cocks, St Albans, Hertfordshire. Its claim to be the oldest pub in Britain is disputed by other establishments.

=== South West England ===
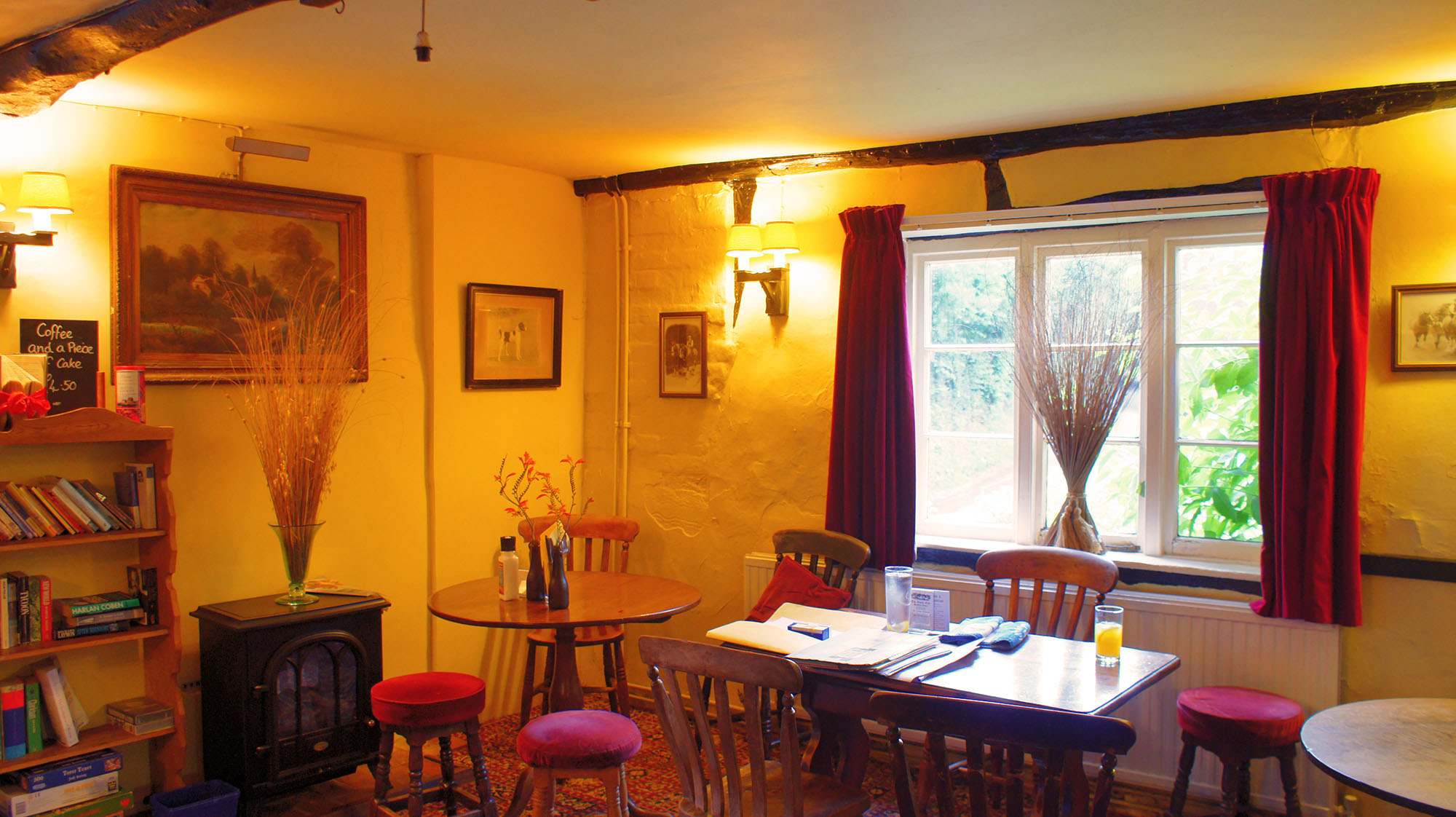
The interior of The Royal Oak, Wootton Rivers, Wiltshire.

- Jamaica Inn in Bolventor, a hamlet on Bodmin Moor, Cornwall. Location of the 1936 novel by Daphne du Maurier, made into the film by Alfred Hitchcock in 1939.
- The Warren House Inn is a remote and isolated public house in the heart of Dartmoor, Devon. It is the highest pub in southern England at 1,425 feet (434 m) above sea level. It is located on an ancient road across the moor, about 2 miles (3 km) northeast of the village of Postbridge and has been a stopping point for travellers since the middle of the 18th century.
- Luttrell Arms, Dunster. Built in the 15th century.
- George Hotel and Pilgrims' Inn, Glastonbury. Built in 15th century.
- Queen's Hall, Minehead. Built in 1914 as cinema and theatre.
- The George Inn, Norton St Philip, Somerset. Built in the 14th or 15th century as a wool store for the priory at Hinton Charterhouse. Later used as army headquarters, during the Monmouth Rebellion in 1685, and a courtroom by Judge Jeffreys as part of the Bloody Assizes.
- Tudor Tavern, Taunton, Built 1578

Bristol

- The Black Castle Public House in the Brislington area of the city. Also known as Arno's Castle, it was erected in 1745–1755 as a folly sham castle from pre-cast black copper-slag blocks from Reeve's foundry at Crew's Hole. The building is now Grade I-listed.
- The Coronation Tap, a Cider house in the suburb of Clifton. Originally built as a farm, it has existed as a licensed premises for over two hundred years.
- The Crown. Built in the 18th century.
- The Hatchet on Frogmore Street, is a Grade II-listed building dating from 1606. There were formerly cock-fighting and Boxing rings on the site, the latter of which is commemorated by a plaque in the pub's beer garden.
- The King William Ale House and The Famous Royal Navy Volunteer Public House on King Street. Originally a row of three houses dating to around 1670, these are now two public houses side by side with gabled fronts to the road.
- The Llandoger Trow on King Street. Dating from 1664, the name derives from the village of Llandogo in South Wales. Robert Louis Stevenson is said to have modelled The Admiral Benbow pub in Treasure Island on the Llandoger Trow.
- The Mauretania (currently the Mauretania Bar & Lounge), on Park Street. Includes some of the furnishings from the RMS Mauretania.
- The Nova Scotia. Situated on Spike Island adjacent to the Cumberland Basin in Bristol Harbour.
- The Old Duke on King Street opposite the Llandoger Trow; a Jazz and Blues venue, the building dates from about 1780. Originally named The Duke of Cumberland, the name was changed to honour jazz musician Duke Ellington.
- The Old Post Office. Built in 1746.
- The Palace Hotel, on West Street, in the Old Market area of the city centre. Built in 1869 to accommodate travellers from the nearby railway station in Midland Road, its exterior ornamentation includes two Assyrian-style hermai.
- The Printers Devil. A grade-II listed building originally named The Queens Head, the name was changed in the 1980s. The pub closed in 2008 and remains closed. A Printer's devil was an apprentice in a printing establishment who performed a number of tasks, such as mixing tubs of ink and fetching type.
- The Pump House in the Hotwells district. Built around 1870 by Thomas Howard as a Hydraulic Pumping House to provide power to the bridges and machines of Bristol Harbour, the building is now used as a gastropub.
- The Seven Stars on St. Thomas Lane in the Redcliffe district of the city. First recorded in 1694, it is strongly associated with the abolitionist Thomas Clarkson.
- The Shakespeare on Prince Street. Built as a Georgian mansion in 1725, it became a public house in 1777, its name deriving from the nearby Theatre Royal.
- The Shakespeare Inn on Victoria Street. Now known as Ye Shakespeare, this pub dates from 1636.
- The Stag & Hounds is also located in the Old Market area of the city centre, the building dates from 1483 when it was erected as a private house, although the current building is of predominantly 18th century origin.
- The Victoria also in the suburb of Clifton. Originally a part of the much larger historic Lido, the corner was sold off to create the pub at some time before 1879. The pub building is grade II-listed and is owned and run by the Dawkins Brewery.

=== Southern England ===
- The Bat & Ball Inn, Clanfield, Hampshire. A 17th-century inn next to the 'Cradle of Cricket' at Broadhalfpenny Down, currently owned by Fullers; former Hambledon player Richard Nyren was landlord between 1760 and 1771.
- The Bell Inn at Aldworth in Berkshire. A 15th century inn that has twice won the National Pub of the Year award.
- The Trout Inn, Lechlade in Gloucestershire. Has its origin as an almshouse from around 1229.
- The Bear Inn, Oxford, said to be Oxford's oldest pub, dating back to 1242; it also boasts a large collection of ties.
- The Eagle and Child on St Giles' in Oxford owned by St John's College. Best known for having been frequented by The Inklings, a literary circle that included J. R. R. Tolkien and C. S. Lewis; it is known locally as The Bird & Baby.
- The Lamb & Flag, on St Giles' in Oxford which is also owned by St John's College. This pub has been in existence as an alehouse since 1695 and was named after the two symbols of John the Baptist – a lamb and a flag. Brewery-owned between 1829 and 1999, the college now offers financial support to DPhil students from the pub's profits.
- The Turf Tavern, Oxford, where former US president Bill Clinton "did not inhale" marijuana and former Australian prime minister Bob Hawke entered the Guinness Book of Records for downing a yard of ale in 11 seconds.
- The Red Lion Inn, Southampton, a very old timber-beamed pub dating from 1148 where King Henry V tried traitors to the crown in 1415 on the eve of his departure to France.
- The Trout Inn, Lower Wolvercote, Oxfordshire, England

=== West Midlands ===
- The Adam & Eve, a public house in Deritend dating back to at least 1801.
- Anchor Inn, Birmingham, one of the oldest public houses in Digbeth, Birmingham, England, dating back to 1797
- The Crooked House (officially called The Glynne Arms and now demolished) in Himley near Dudley, Staffordshire. Formerly The Siden Arms, subsidence caused by overmining led the building to fall into a hole in the early 19th century. It has been saved by buttressing, but tilts at a 15-degree angle.
- The Dirty Duck in Stratford-upon-Avon, also known as The Black Swan, has been a pub since 1738. It is frequented by actors from the nearby Royal Shakespeare Company theatres and has photos inside of famous visitors and actors from over the years, including Judi Dench and Richard Burton.
- The Garrick Inn, Stratford-upon-Avon. A pub in its current building since 1718, but an inn on the site has existed for a lot longer reputedly making it the oldest pub in Stratford. Named after Shakespearean actor David Garrick.
- The Lad in the Lane in Erdington, near Birmingham. An inn from 1780 and formerly known as The Green Man (though reconstructed at a later date), some of the beams are said to date to the 13th century when the building was a home to a wealthy family connected to the Earl of Warwick.
- The Old Crown in Deritend, Birmingham. One of the oldest buildings in the city and the oldest pub in the city, dating back to 1368.
- The Picture House in Stafford is a former cinema, built in 1913 and converted into a pub in 1997, retaining original features.

=== Yorkshire ===
- The Bingley Arms, claiming to be the oldest recorded inn in Britain, located in the small village of Bardsey, West Yorkshire.

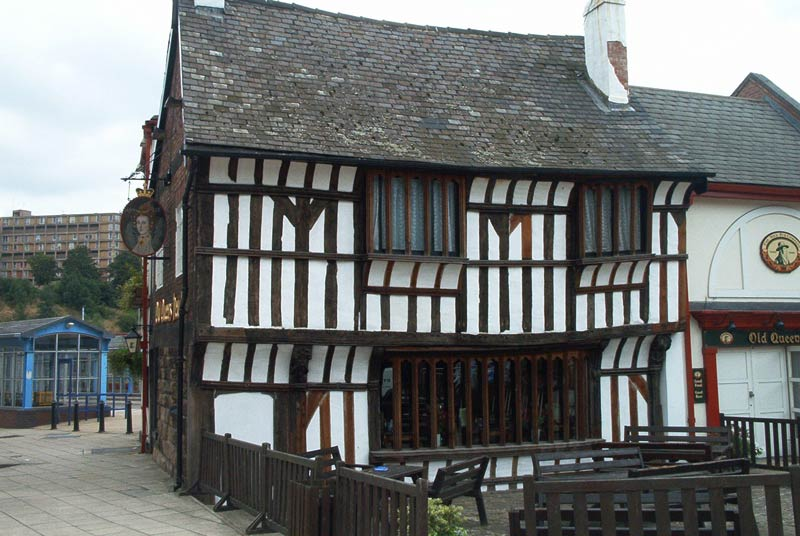
The Old Queen's Head, Sheffield

- The Kelham Island Tavern, Sheffield, is the only pub to have won CAMRA's National Pub of the Year award twice in a row.
- The Lion Inn, Blakey Ridge, North Yorkshire – the second highest pub in Yorkshire, and the fourth highest in England.
- The New Penny, reported to be the oldest continually running gay pub in the UK, in The Calls, Leeds
- The Moorcock Inn, a pub near to the Settle-Carlisle Railway at Garsdale Head
- The Old Queen's Head, opened as a public house in the mid-19th century, but is one of the oldest Grade II* listed buildings in Sheffield, dating from around 1475. The Queen in the pub's name is thought to be Mary, Queen of Scots, who was imprisoned in Sheffield from 1570 to 1584.
- The Tan Hill Inn in Yorkshire is the highest inn in England at 1,732 feet (528 m) above sea level. Tan Hill is a high point on the Pennine Way. It also won the right to continue to call its Christmas dinner a "family feast", which Kentucky Fried Chicken had registered as a trademark.

== Northern Ireland ==
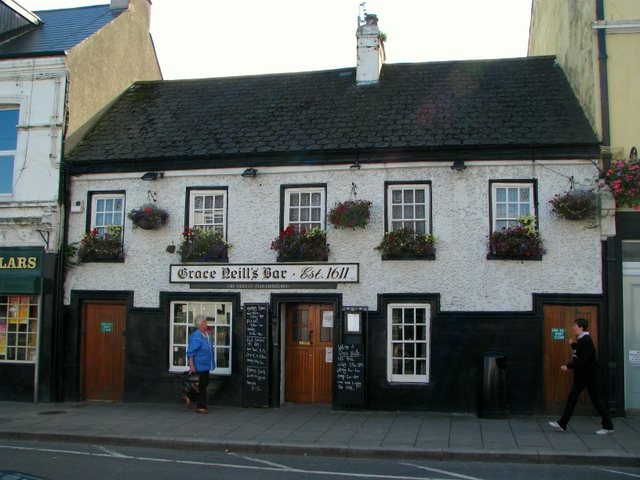
Grace Neill's in County Down was founded in 1611

- House of McDonnell, Ballycastle
- Crosskeys Inn, County Antrim
- Bittles Bar, Belfast
- The Botanic Inn, Belfast
- Crown Liquor Saloon, Belfast
- Garrick Bar, Belfast
- Kelly's Cellars, Belfast
- Kitchen Bar, Belfast
- The Northern Whig, Belfast
- The Hatfield House, Belfast
- Grace Neill's, Donaghadee

== Wales ==
- Abbey Hotel, Llanthony Priory, Monmouthshire, a Grade I listed country inn and hotel.
- Albion Ale House, Conwy, a 1920s pub jointly operated by four North Wales breweries. Grade II listed and winner of two CAMRA awards: 2013 Wales Pub of the Year and the 2014 CAMRA English Heritage Conservation Award.
- The Blue Anchor Inn, Aberthaw, Vale of Glamorgan, a 14th-century Grade II* listed thatched pub.
- Golden Cross, Cardiff, a distinctive Edwardian pub the current building dates from 1903.
- Palladium, Llandudno, built in 1920, a former theatre converted to a pub in 2001, Grade II listed.
- The Robin Hood Inn, Monmouth a late medieval Grade II* listed pub.
- The Vulcan, Cardiff, built in 1853 and became Cardiff's oldest public house under its original name, it was dismantled in 2012 to be re-erected at St Fagans National History Museum.
- Ye Olde Murenger House, claimed to be the oldest pub in Newport.
- Black Boy Inn, in the Royal Town of Caernarfon in Gwynedd, Wales is a hotel and public house which is thought to date back to 1522.
- The Griffin, Monmouth, the Star was originally built 1639, as a lobby-entrance building with integral rear wing.

== See also ==
- Pub names in Great Britain
- List of bars
- List of pubs in Dublin (city)
- List of pubs named Carpenters Arms
- Index of drinking establishment–related articles
- Pubs in Brighton
