= Old Ship =

Old Ship may refer to:

== Places ==
- Old Ship Street Historic District, Medford, Massachusetts, USA

== Buildings ==
- Old Ship, Aveley, Essex, London, England, UK
- Old Ship, Richmond, London, England, UK
- Old Ship Hotel, Brighton, England, UK
- Old Ship Church, Hingham, Massachusetts, USA
- Old Ship African Methodist Episcopal Zion Church, Montgomery, Alabama, USA

== See also ==
- old (disambiguation)
- ship (disambiguation)
