= The Old Thatch Tavern =

Pub in Stratford-upon-Avon, Warwickshire, England

Coordinates: 52.192985°N 1.711191°W

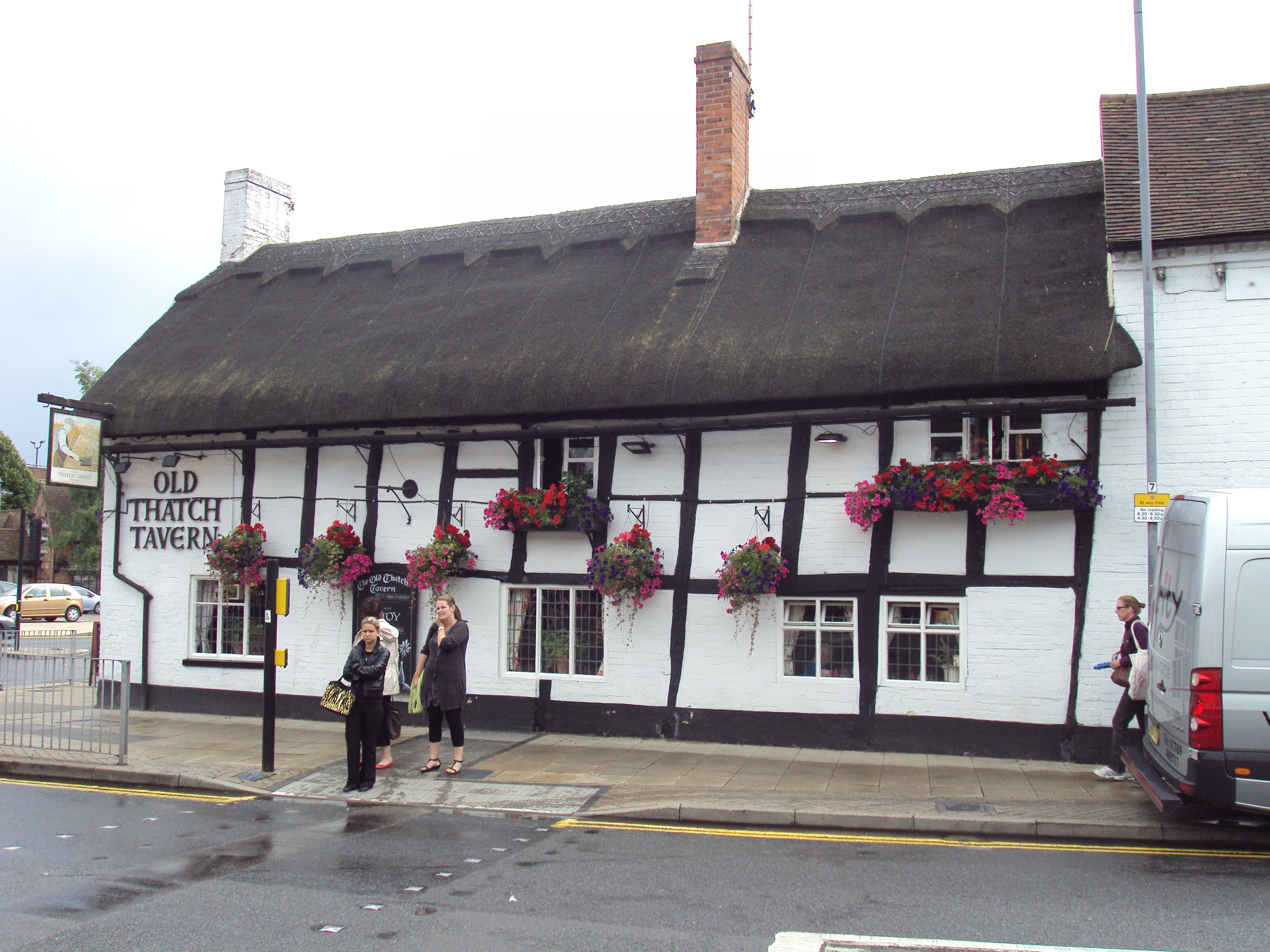
Old Thatch Tavern, Stratford-upon-Avon. The only thatched building left in Stratford town centre

The Old Thatch Tavern is a pub in the town centre of Stratford-upon-Avon, England. The tavern is on the corner of Rother Street and Greenhill Street.

== History ==
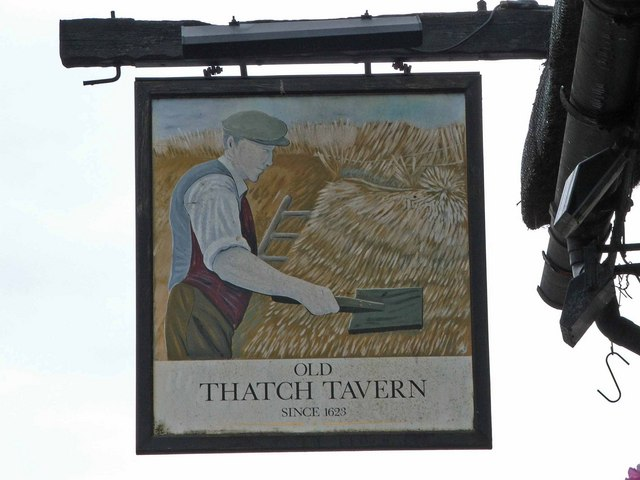
The Old Thatch Tavern pub sign

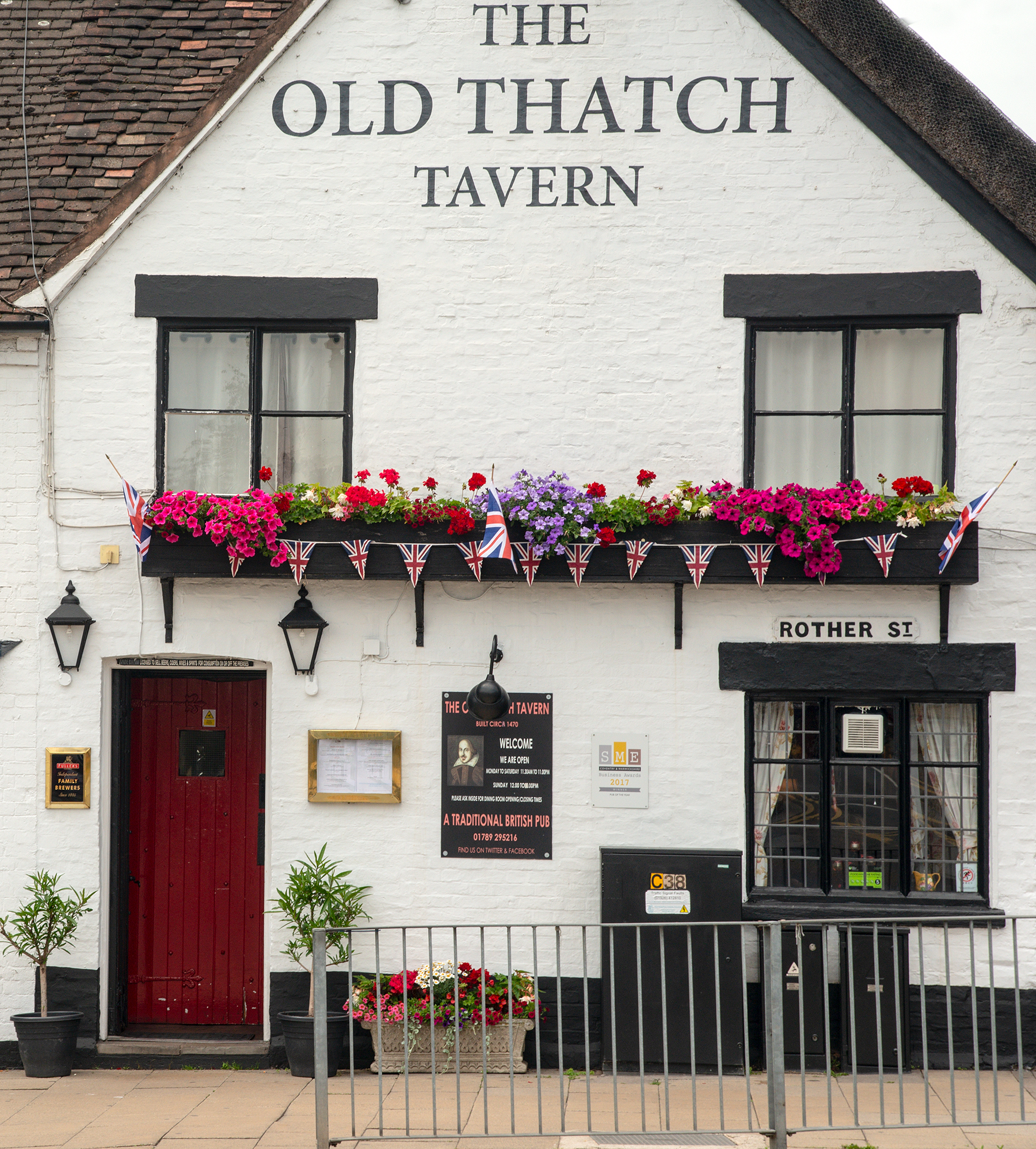
Window boxes decorate the exterior in spring and summer

The Old Thatch Tavern became the brewery for Stratford-upon-Avon in 1470 when it was also a pub. It has been a licensed pub since 1623 and it is claimed that it is the oldest pub in Stratford. (Note: The old Thatch Tavern has been an ale-house since 1470 and is possibly the oldest pub in Stratford within the same building. However, The Garrick Inn in Stratford has possibly had an inn on its site within different properties for longer. The claim to be the oldest pub in Stratford may also come from its licensing date of 1623, with other pubs in Stratford possibly not having an official license until later.)

The thatched building in which the pub is located has a Grade II listing. The current structure was built in the 1500s, and subsequently altered in the early 1800s. This is the only thatched-roof property in Stratford's town centre.

== See also ==
- List of pubs in the United Kingdom
