= Lad in the Lane =

Historic pub in West Midlands, England

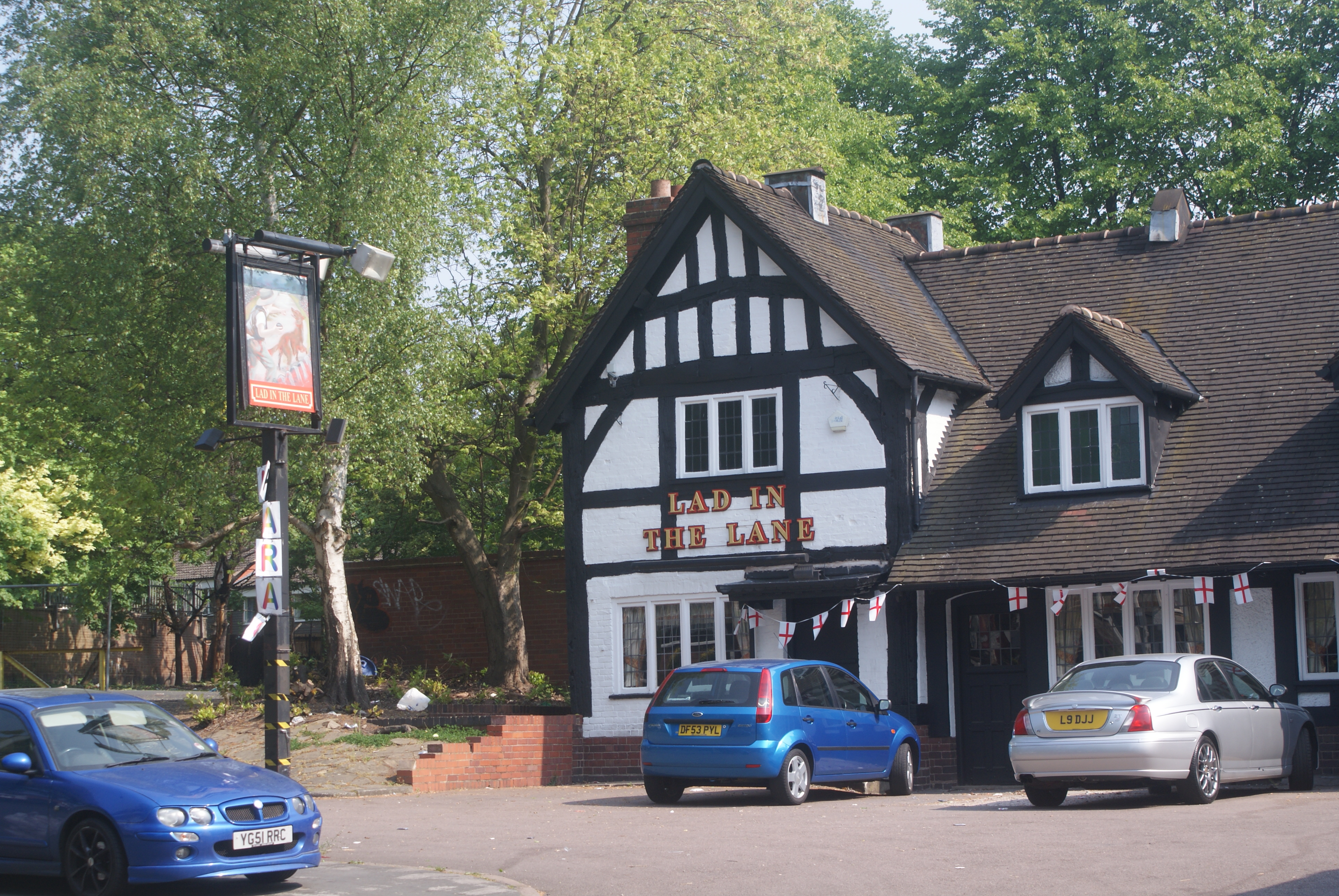

- Location within West Midlands county

General information
- Architectural style: Tudor/ Tudorbethan
- Location: Bromford Lane, Erdington,, Birmingham, West Midlands,, England
- Coordinates: 52.51468°N 1.83548°W
- Construction started: Late 14th century
- Completed: 1930s

The Lad in the Lane is a pub in the Bromford area of Erdington in Birmingham, England. Dating to the year 1400, it is considered to be the oldest house and pub in the city, although The Old Crown in Digbeth claims to date from 1368, a date which is yet to be confirmed. Prior to the dating of the building, New Shipton Barn in Walmley was considered to be the oldest building in Birmingham, dating to around 1425. To find the construction date of the building, scientists used a technique called dendrochronology to analyse the timbers in the oldest known part of the building. The results showed that it was constructed in the spring at the end of the 14th century.

When constructed in 1400, it was used as a home for a family of high status. It is believed to have remained as a house until the early 1780s, when it was converted into a pub by the owners who were established in 1306. Throughout its lifetime as a pub, it has also been known as The Green Man and the Old Green Man. It was used by foresters who worked for the Earl of Warwick. In the 1930s, the pub was extended and altered.

In 1912/13 the register of electors will show that the famous England, Aston Villa, WBA, Leicester Fosse and Lincoln City footballer Billy Garraty was the landlord.

On 25 April 1952 the building received listed status. This was altered on 8 July 1982 so that it became a Grade II listed building.

== See also ==
- List of pubs in the United Kingdom
- Listed buildings in Birmingham
