= Alice Diehl =

English musician and novelist

Alice Diehl (25 February 1844 – 13 June 1912) was an English musician and novelist. She changed in 1872 from being a concert pianist into being a writer – of music reviews, some 50 novels and several other books.

== Family and career ==
Alice Diehl was born Alice Georgina Mangold in Aveley, Essex, at the house of her maternal grandfather, Charles Vidal, a village doctor born in Jamaica, who had practised in Aveley since 1804. She was the second child of her parents, Carl Mangold and Eliza, née Vidal, who lived mainly in London, where Carl taught music.

Alice Diehl first performed publicly on the piano in Paris in 1861. In 1863 she married the violinist and song composer Louis Diehle (c. 1837–1910), by whom she had six children. Her playing was praised by Berlioz and she continued to perform in London until 1872.

== From music to writing ==
As a child, Alice had had two books of her poems published, so that her switch to writing in about 1872 was a return to an earlier interest. The idea that she should become a professional pianist had arisen when her father showed some signs of mental instability and her grandfather viewed this as a source of family income. For a time she was taught in Silesia by a pianist and composer, Adolphe Henselt, who was known to her father. Henselt's unusual methods of teaching piano are described in her memoirs.

Subsequently, Diehl herself gained an income from teaching music, coupled with writing reviews for Musical World and other periodicals, and later short stories. From the early 1880s onwards she produced almost 50 novels, including Griselda (1886), which has been described by a recent critic as "a heavy-handed story of womanly self-sacrifice". Many of these were mysteries or sensation novels.

Of interest for the light they shed on musical life and other aspects of London are her two autobiographical volumes: Musical Memories (1897) and The True Story of My Life (1908). The second was also published in New York and appeared in the same year as her Life of Beethoven. For The Story of Philosophy (1881) she used the pseudonym Aston Leigh.

== Death ==
Alice Diehl died on 13 June 1912. Shortly before her death she is known to have been living in Ingatestone, Essex. A Thurrock Heritage plaque to Alice Diehl was unveiled on 23 January 2010 at the Aveley Christian Centre, Stifford Road. This was formerly the school opposite the house in Park Lane where she was born.
