= Brewers Investment Corporation =

British company

The Brewers Investment Corporation Ltd was active in the Midlands during the late 19th century. Its registered offices were at Nos.3-4, County Chambers, Corporation Street, Birmingham.

The company's projects included the purchase and refurbishment of the Adam & Eve in 1889.

The Brewers Investment Corporation had become a public company by 1895 and was listed on the London Stock Exchange for that year.
