= Aveley =

Town in Essex, England

Coordinates: 51.50177°N 0.25339°E

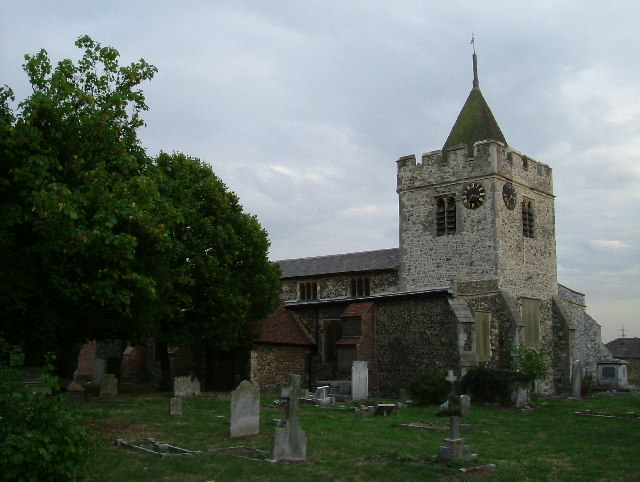
- St Michael's, Aveley

- Location within Essex
- Area: 1.64 km^{2} (0.63 sq mi)
- Population: 9,360 (Built up area, 2021)
  - Density: 5,707/km^{2} (14,780/sq mi)
- OS grid reference: TQ565805
- Unitary authority: Thurrock
- Ceremonial county: Essex
- Region: East
- Country: England
- Sovereign state: United Kingdom
- Post town: SOUTH OCKENDON
- Postcode district: RM15
- Dialling code: 01708
- Police: Essex
- Fire: Essex
- Ambulance: East of England
- UK Parliament: Thurrock

Aveley is a town in the borough of Thurrock in Essex, England. It lies 16 miles (26 km) east of Charing Cross. It is inside the M25 motorway which encircles London, but lies just outside the Greater London boundary. Aveley was historically a parish; the parish was abolished for civil purposes in 1936 when Aveley became part of Thurrock. At the 2021 census the built up area of Aveley had a population of 9,360.

== Geography ==
Aveley is located just inside M25 motorway and is roughly bounded to the north and west by the London Borough of Havering, to the south by the A13 road and to the east by the M25 motorway. The nearest places are Purfleet, South Ockendon, Wennington and Rainham.

== History ==
Aveley has given its name to the Aveley Interglacial period around 200,000 years ago. Important evidence of the local flora and fauna of the period and some signs of occupation by Neanderthal humans have been found there.

In the Domesday Book of 1086, the name has various spellings – Alvithelea, Alvileia and Alvilea. The name means the wood clearing of a woman named Ælfgȳth. A variation, in 1418, is Alvythele.

Aveley was an ancient parish in the Hundred of Chafford in Essex. When elected parish and district councils were established under the Local Government Act 1894, Aveley was given a parish council and included in the Orsett Rural District. In 1929, Aveley and the neighbouring parishes of South Ockendon and West Thurrock were removed from Orsett Rural District to become the short-lived Purfleet Urban District. As part of that reform, Aveley was reclassified as an urban parish and so lost its parish council; the lowest elected tier of local government was Purfleet Urban District Council. The Purfleet Urban District was abolished just seven years later in 1936, becoming part of Thurrock Urban District. The civil parish of Aveley was abolished on 1 April 1936, becoming part of a single parish of Thurrock covering the same area as the urban district.

After the Second World War the population grew rapidly as the area absorbed London overspill.

=== The Aveley mammoth ===
In 1964, amateur geologist John Hesketh found the remains of a late form of steppe mammoth in a clay pit on Sandy Lane. The Natural History Museum excavated the site and uncovered the most complete mammoth skeleton found in the UK, along with a junior straight-tusked elephant found beneath it. The animals were separated by 50,000 years and were originally thought to date back 100,000 and 125,000 years respectively, but recent dating techniques show they died 200,000 and 250,000 years ago.

The skeletons were on display from 1970 to 1990 in the Natural History Museum, before being stored in the museum's palaeontology department for a number of years. They are currently being exhibited in the 'From the Beginning' gallery. Other animal remains were also found at the Aveley site, including a 200,000 year-old jungle cat, a large lion, a brown bear, wolf, rhinoceros, moles, bats, and terrapins.

=== Notable people ===
- Paul Allen, English former professional footballer
- Martina Cole, the crime writer, was brought up in Aveley
- Alice Diehl (née Mangold), the novelist and concert pianist, was born in Aveley.
- Robert W. Gibson, English-American architect, born in Aveley in 1854.
- Kate Evelyn Luard, Royal Red Cross and bar was born in Aveley vicarage.
- John Newton, the author of Amazing Grace, lived in Aveley, which was the home of his father's second wife.
- Alex Pritchard, professional footballer for Tottenham Hotspur, Brentford and Sunderland lived and went to school in Aveley
- Alison Bettles, actress, lived and went to school in Aveley
- Mick Jackson, film director and television producer, was born in Aveley

== Governance ==
Aveley forms part of the Thurrock constituency, and is covered by the Aveley and Uplands ward.

The Aveley and Uplands ward elects three councillors to Thurrock Council. As of May 2026, all 3 councillors have been elected from Reform UK.

== Historic buildings ==
=== St Michael's Church ===
The parish church of St Michael is a Grade I listed building dating from the 12th century. It contains a 14th-century memorial brass to Radulphus de Knevynton, which is echoed in the arms of the Thurrock unitary authority. The church was declared unsafe in the 19th century, with the recommendation that it should be pulled down. However, this was averted by its parishioners, who raised £1,000 to save it.

=== Other listed buildings ===
Grade II*

- Brett's Farmhouse
- Sir Henry Gurnett public house

Grade II

- 79, High Street
- Crown and Anchor public house
- Park Corner House
- 54 and 56 High Street
- Courts Farm, Park Lane.

The core is half of a 13th-century timber framed Manor house.

- Court's Farmhouse barn - demolished within last 15 yrs to make way for a modern housing estate.
- Brett's Farmhouse barn
- Aveley Hall

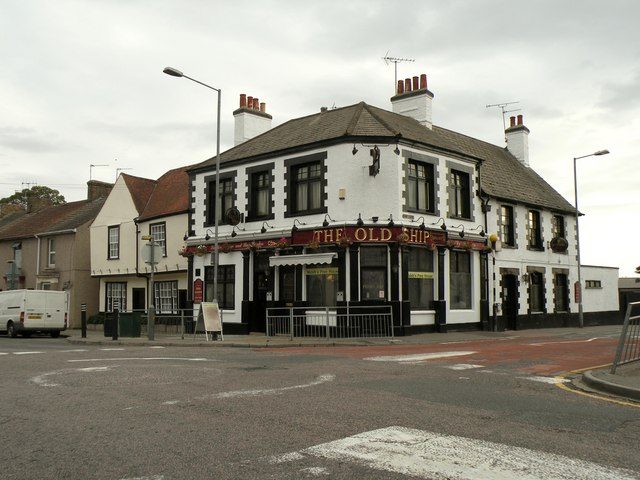
The Old Ship, Aveley

The Old Ship public house at 58 High Street is on the Campaign for Real Ale's National Inventory of Historic Pub Interiors.

== Demographics ==
In the 2021 United Kingdom census the built up area had a population of 9,360. In 1931 the parish had a population of 2,003.

== Sport ==
Aveley is the home of non-League football club Aveley & Hashtag United, both of them playing at Parkside. It was also home of now defunct Thurrock, who played at Ship Lane.

Belhus golf course is located in Aveley near the site of the former Belhus Mansion. Much of the remaining land from Belhus forms the Belhus Woods Country Park.

== Transport ==
The nearest railway stations are:

- Chafford Hundred railway station
- Ockendon railway station
- Purfleet railway station

London Buses route 372 serves the village three times an hour between Hornchurch and Lakeside Shopping Centre. Ensignbus also operates route 22 every 20 minutes from Aveley to Grays via Lakeside Shopping Centre.
