= Queen's Hall, Minehead =

Former theatre in Somerset

Coordinates: 51°12′25″N 3°28′04″W

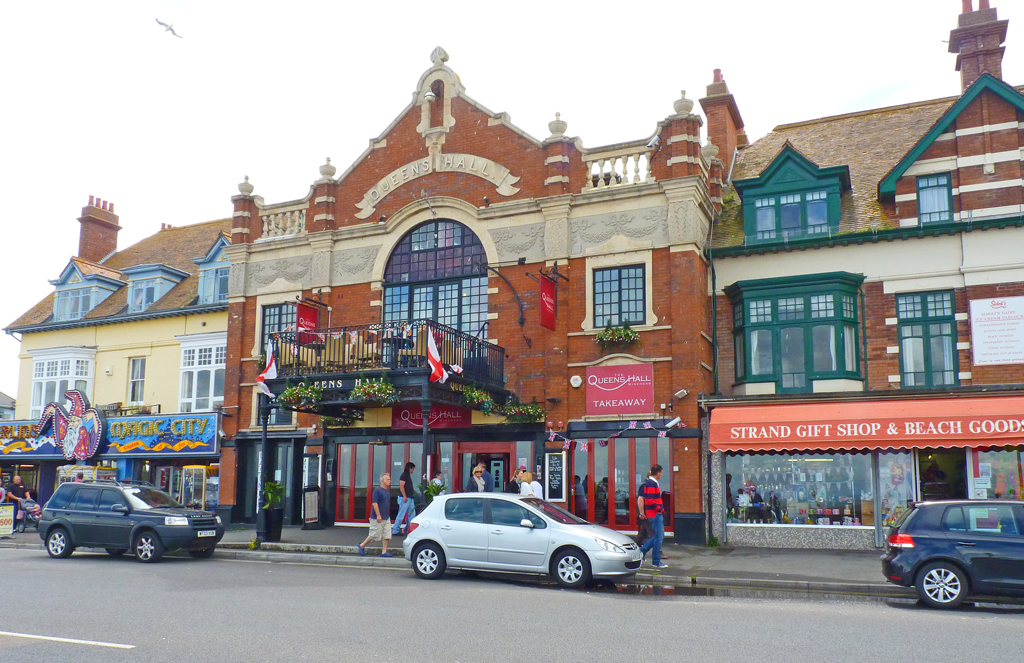
Queen's Hall

The Queen's Hall in Minehead, Somerset, England, was built in 1914 on the sea front of Minehead as a theatre for films and live performances.

It was designed by W. J. Tamlyn, a local architect and built of brick with Bath Stone dressings by J. B. & S. B. Marley. The first show was Oh I Say, which had previously been at the Criterion Theatre in London.

The brick building has three bays, with a decorated fascia and iron-and-glass canopy. The auditorium, which is 100 feet (30 m) by 46 feet (14 m), has a barrel roof with an elliptical proscenium arch with ornamental cartouche. Orchestra stalls and the balcony provided the majority of the seating, and there were two boxes. It was a venue for various ballet and theatrical touring companies and was the first place in the town at which a sound film was shown. In 1930 a Western Electric sound system was installed.

The theatre and cinema closed in 1939 with the outbreak of the Second World War, with the building being used as a canteen for troops. The building suffered major damage in the storms of 1996, with the glass canopy over the entrance being destroyed and flood damage to the hall. The building was restored for use as an amusement arcade and then a public house, at one time called the Mambo bar. Until 2015 it operated under its original name, "The Queen's Hall," as a pub. The pub closed in 2015. The lease was sold in 2012 for an undisclosed sum. It incorporated upper and lower ground floors with the balcony set up as a VIP area. There were also a kitchen and washing up area with a manager's flat above. It was refurbished and reopened in 2016.
