= De Hems =

Pub in Chinatown, London

Coordinates: 51.5120°N 0.1313°W

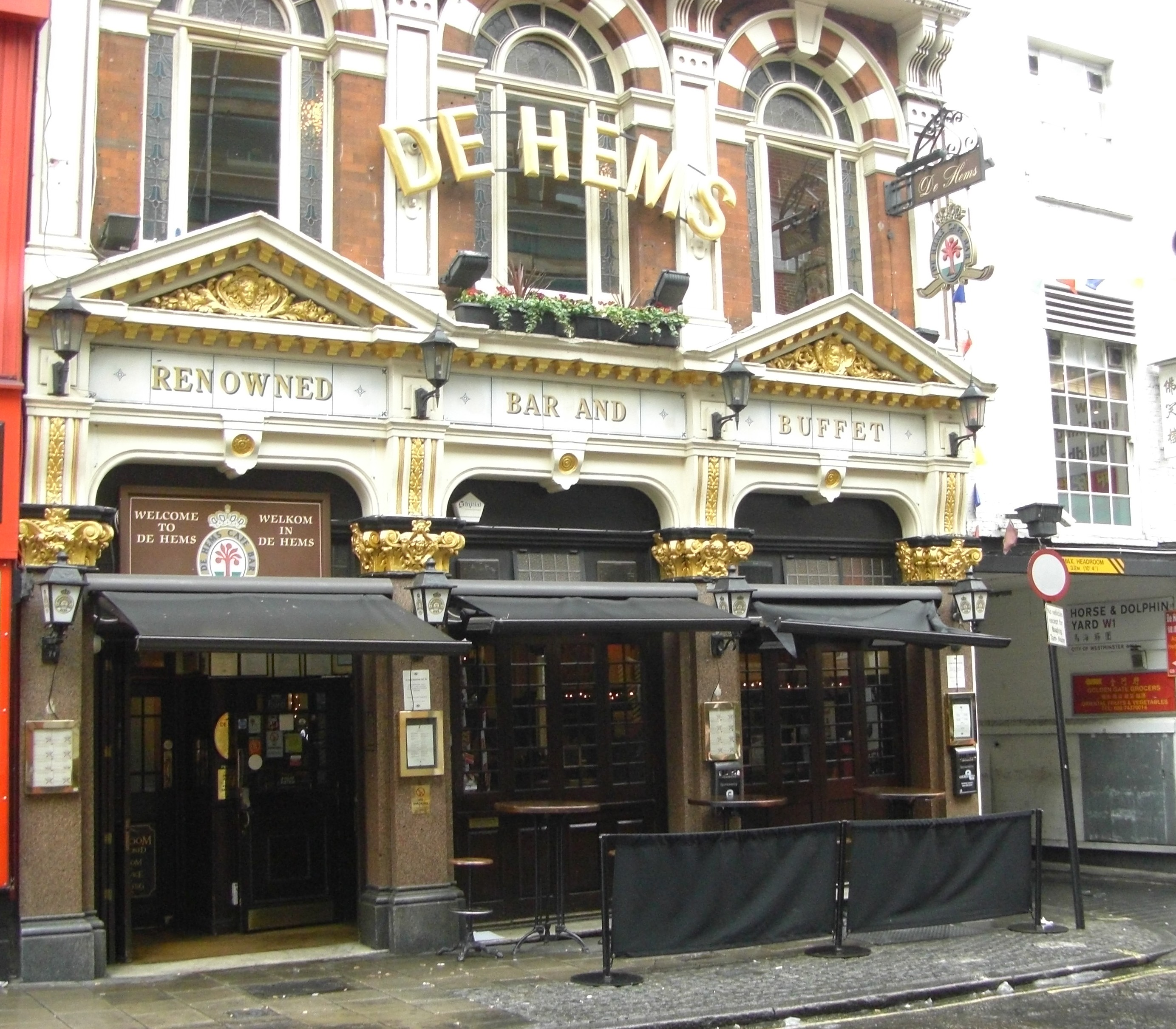
De Hems and the entrance to Horse & Dolphin Yard

De Hems is a café, pub and oyster-house in the Chinatown area of London just off Shaftesbury Avenue. It made its name purveying oysters and now sells beers from the Low Countries such as Lindeboom, Duvel, Chouffe and Heineken with Dutch food such as bitterballen and stoofvlees. It also has a classic British pub menu along side the Dutch classics.

It is on the site of the Horse & Dolphin coaching inn which was built in 1685. This was rebuilt in 1890 by the accomplished pub architects, Saville and Martin, for the publican, Mr Crimmen. It was renamed The Macclesfield, being in Macclesfield Street, and was soon leased by a retired Dutch sea captain called "Papa" De Hem who ran it as an oyster-house, charging a shilling and fourpence ha'penny for a serving.

It was patronised by fin-de-siècle literati such as the poet Swinburne, who travelled 10 miles daily to eat oysters at the long marble bar, and George Sims who wrote a quatrain in praise:

When oysters to September yield,
and grace the grotto'd Macclesfield,
I will be there, my dear De Hem,
to wish you well and sample them.

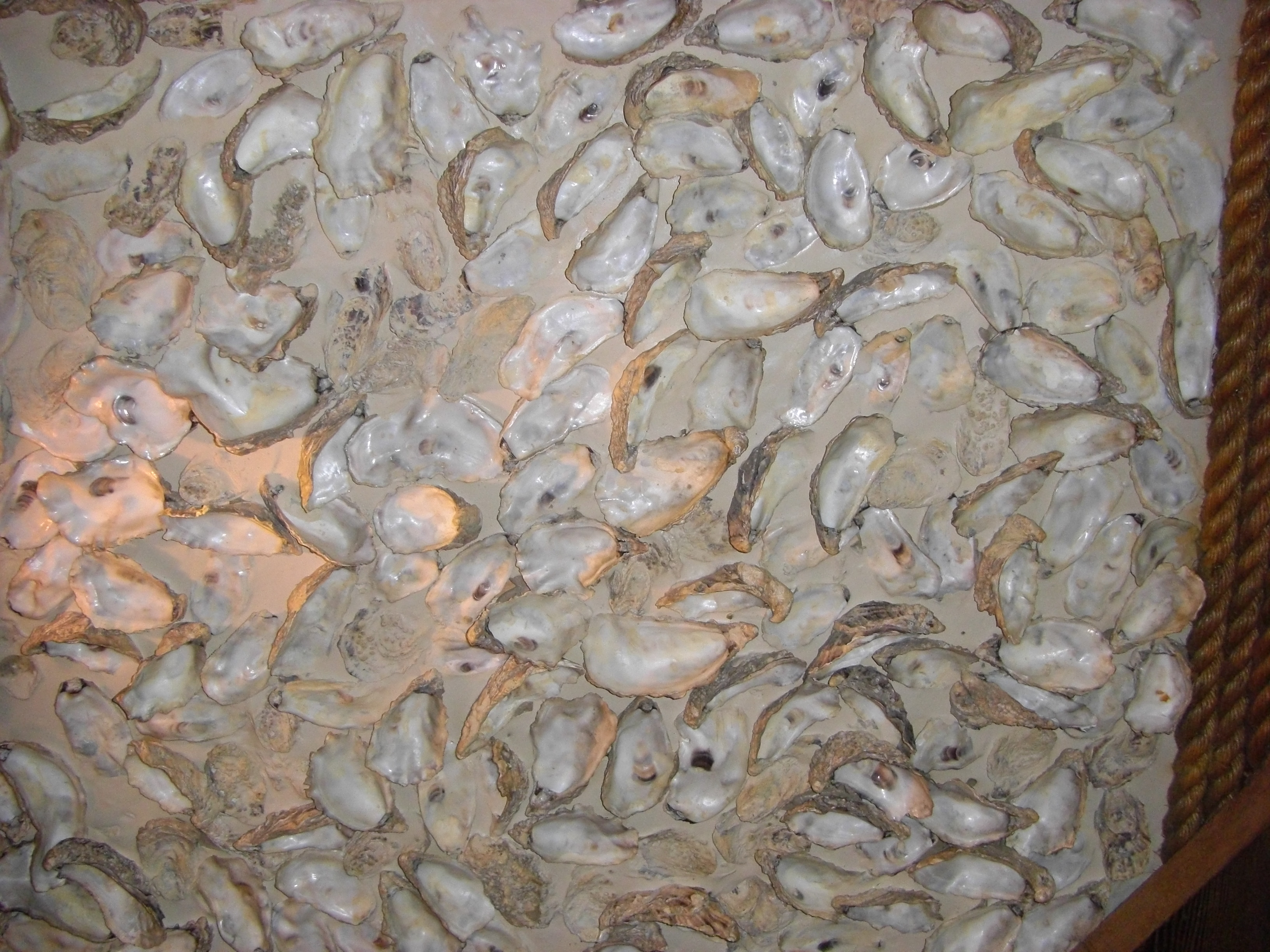
Oyster shells in the walls of the Shell Room

The rhyme alludes to the common proverb that it is only safe to eat oysters when there is an R in the name of the month — after the hot summer months from May to August. The grotto referred to was The Shell Room upstairs, created from the discarded oyster shells which decorated its walls — some 300,000 at their peak. Only a few now remain but the bar now claims to sell a similar number of pints of Oranjeboom each year.

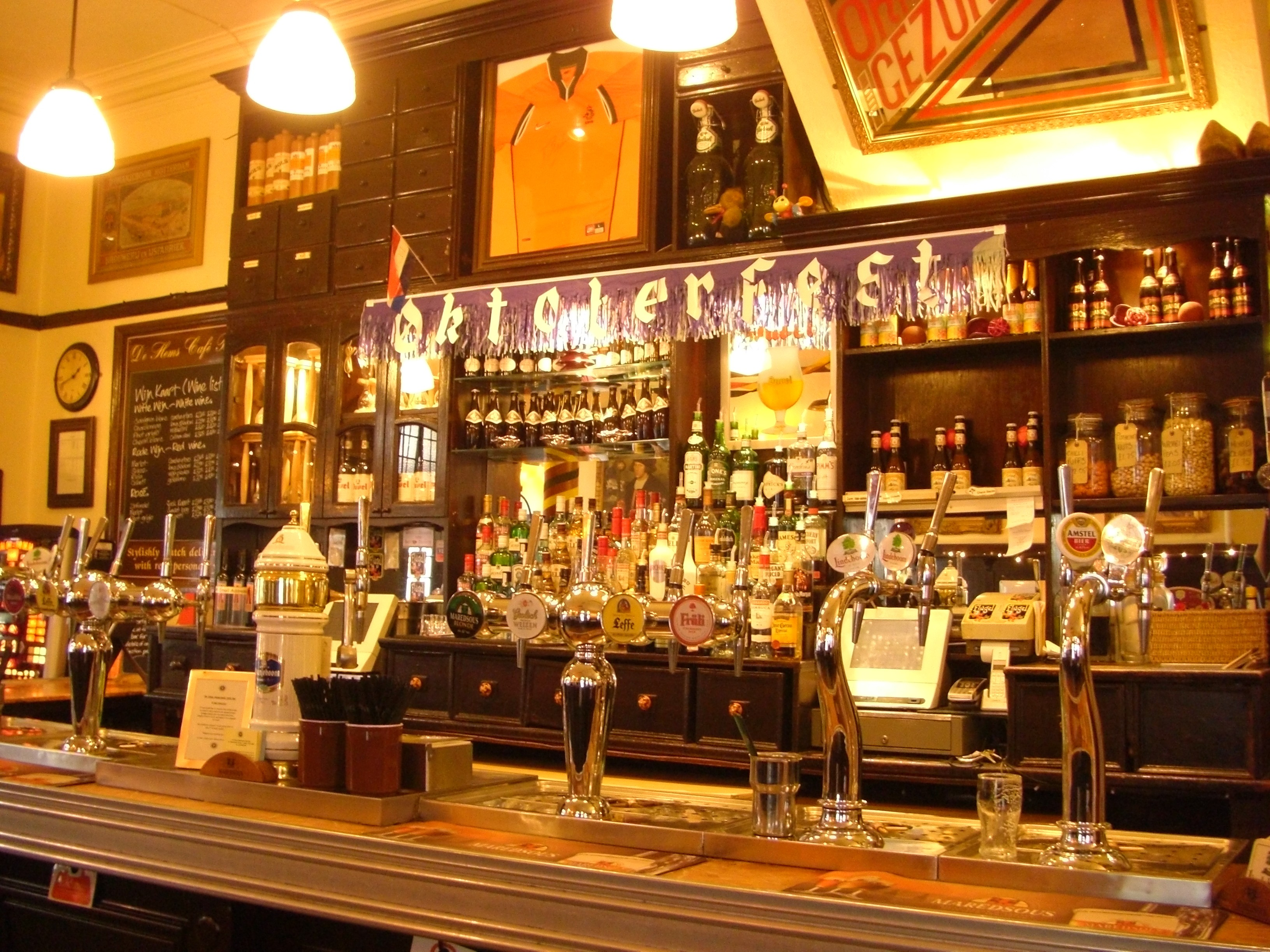
The bar, showing the range of beers.

In the early 20th century, literary figures such as Clemence Dane continued to purchase the establishment's oysters, stout and champagne for their theatrical celebrations. In the 1920s, it became the hangout of gangsters too. When World War I started, patriotic Papa De Hem gave his staff £50 each to return to their threatened country. During World War II, after Holland actually fell to the German invasion, Dutch resistance exiles then met regularly at the pub which became their unofficial headquarters. Another patron at that time was the notorious spy, Kim Philby, who was friendly with the chef, who wore a tall white hat.

In 1959, it was renamed De Hems in honour of the captain and then, in the 1960s, it became popular with music industry people such as Alan Price, Georgie Fame and Andrew Loog Oldham, manager of the Rolling Stones. At the turn of the new century, the venue hosted a comedy club — the Oranje Boom-Boom Cabaret — which included the debut of The Mighty Boosh.

However, the 1951-52 Good Food Guide calls the restaurant De Hems earlier than 1959. Its entry reads: "Good English cooking in a restaurant lined with oyster shells. Choose shellfish when you can. Zealous manager, reasonable prices; wine slow in arriving, from a good and cheap list."

In the early 21st century, De Hems was popular as a place to celebrate and follow the successful Dutch football team. During the 2010 World Cup, hundreds of fans had to be turned away and manager Sian Blair had to hire a security staff of seven bouncers for the occasion. The upstairs and downstairs bars each accommodated a hundred cheerful revellers for these big matches. The pub still shows Dutch national and international football, most notably in their Gallerij bar upstairs.
