= Grace Neill's =

Pub in Donaghadee, Northern Ireland

Coordinates: 54.642°N 5.537°W

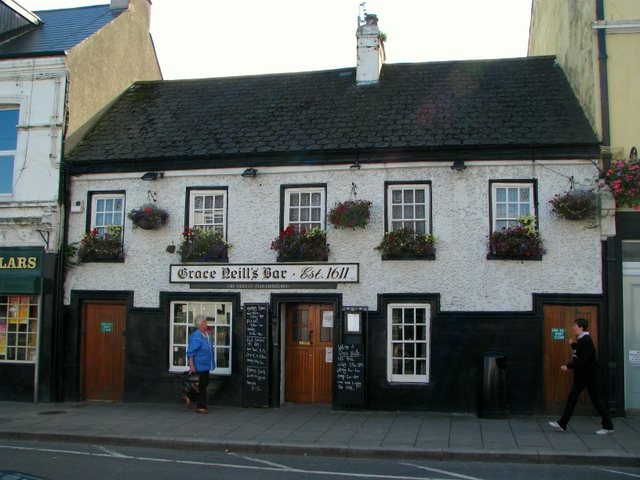
Grace Neill's in 2008

Grace Neill's, in the town of Donaghadee, Northern Ireland, is "one of Ireland's oldest pubs" and was opened in 1611.

== History ==
The pub was opened in 1611 as the King's Arms. According to family tradition, Grace Neill was given the pub as a wedding gift from her father. Neill was a well-known figure in Donaghadee and owned the bar until her death in 1916. The pub was renamed in her honour.

Russian Czar Peter the Great, poet John Keats and novelist Daniel Defoe are all said to have visited the pub.

== Present day ==
Situated on High Street, the small bar has stone flooring and beams that were constructed from ship timber, both of which are original to the building, and antiques and memorabilia displayed around its interior.

Grace Neill's has the oldest known pub deeds in Ireland, and is sometimes listed alongside other Irish pubs (including Sean's Bar in Athlone) as the "oldest licensed pub in Ireland".

In 2010, Grace Neill's was featured in the Michelin Eating Out In Pubs guide.
