= Adam & Eve, Birmingham =

Adam & Eve
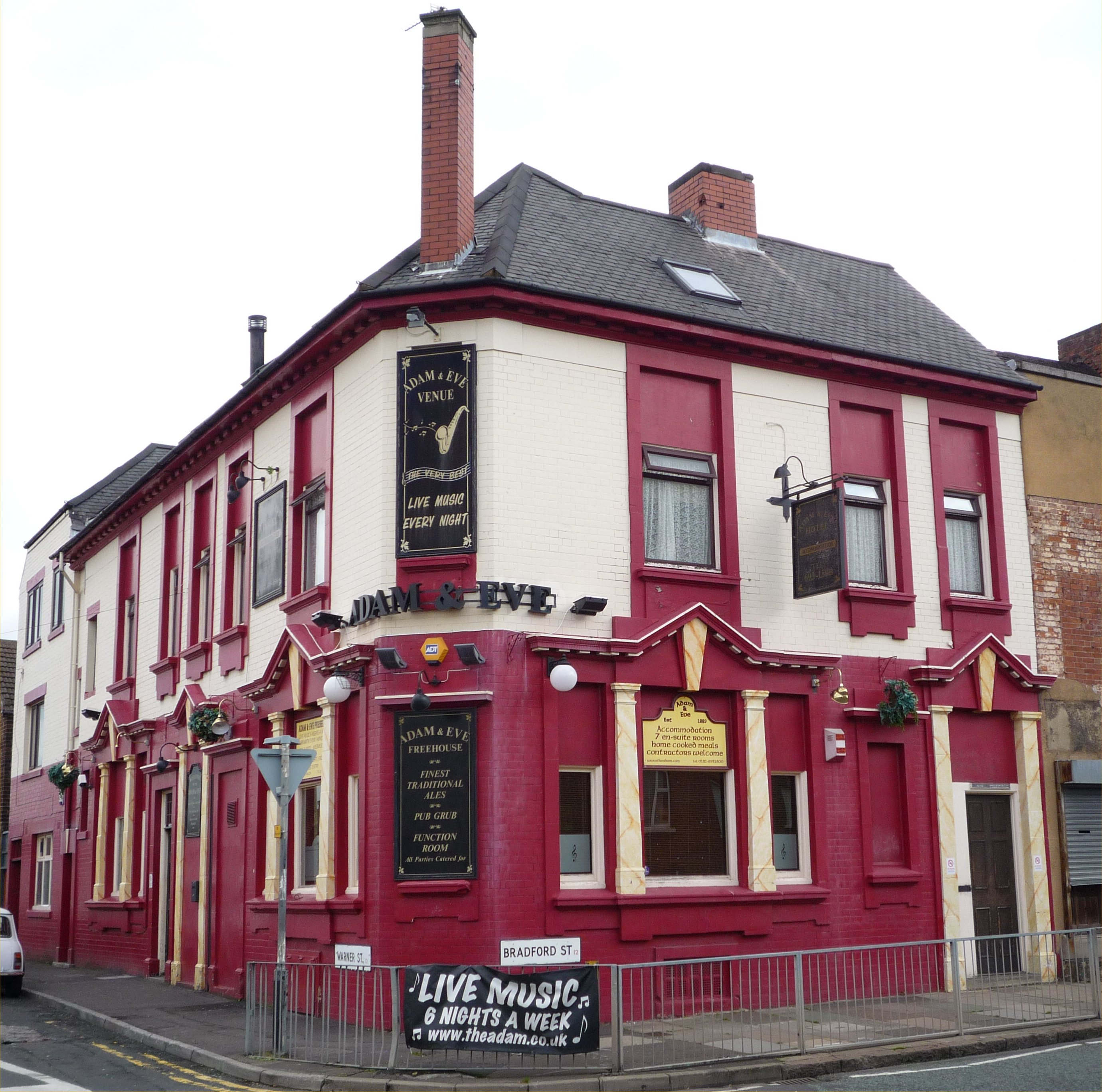
- The Adam and Eve in 2008, before its closure
- Interactive map of the Adam & Eve area

General information
- Type: Public house
- Location: Deritend, Birmingham, England
- Coordinates: 52.4714°N 1.8804°W
- Completed: 1928 (current form)

The Adam & Eve is a former public house located on the corner of Bradford Street and Warner Street, in Deritend, Birmingham, England. There had been a public house of this name in this location for at least 200 years.

== Name ==
The Adam & Eve is an uncommon pub name. However, it is connected to the drinks trade through the Worshipful Company of Fruiterers who incorporated Adam and Eve in their crest.

== Original building ==
The future site of the Adam & Eve is marked on an estate plan drawn by Samuel Bradford in 1748. However its first recorded licensee, John Robinson, does not appear in the Warwick Licensing and Justices records until 1801.

Pubs in Deritend were also licensed by Bordesley magistrates but their names were not recorded. Robinson appears in these records for 1787–1800 and so may also have been the landlord during this period.

The original building's layout is described in an 1837 rate book for Aston. This lists a back-part, a washhouse, a stable and a house fronting Warner Street, as each part of the property was subjected to a separate rate.

== Contemporary premises ==
In 1889, the Adam & Eve was taken over by the Brewers Investment Corporation Ltd who set about remodelling it. Large windows and fascia boards were added, making it similar to other pubs of the time. The internal floor space was restructured and an outdoor department was created. Toilets were also constructed in the rear yard.

Further modifications were made to the building in 1921 and 1928 when a smoke room and kitchen were added. An assembly room and dining room were also opened on the first floor. The new layout also incorporated indoor toilets, which made the pub rather up-market for the time.

The Adam & Eve was severely damaged during the Birmingham Blitz and was never fully restored. Many of its neighbouring buildings were completely destroyed.

== Closure ==
The Adam & Eve ceased trading as a public house in 2015, following a triple stabbing incident in October of the previous year. The premises were put up for auction and bought by a social housing trust who converted them into residential accommodation.

In 2018 a not for profit coffee shop was opened on the ground floor.
