= Stag Inn, Hastings =

Grade II listed pub in the United Kingdom

Stag Inn
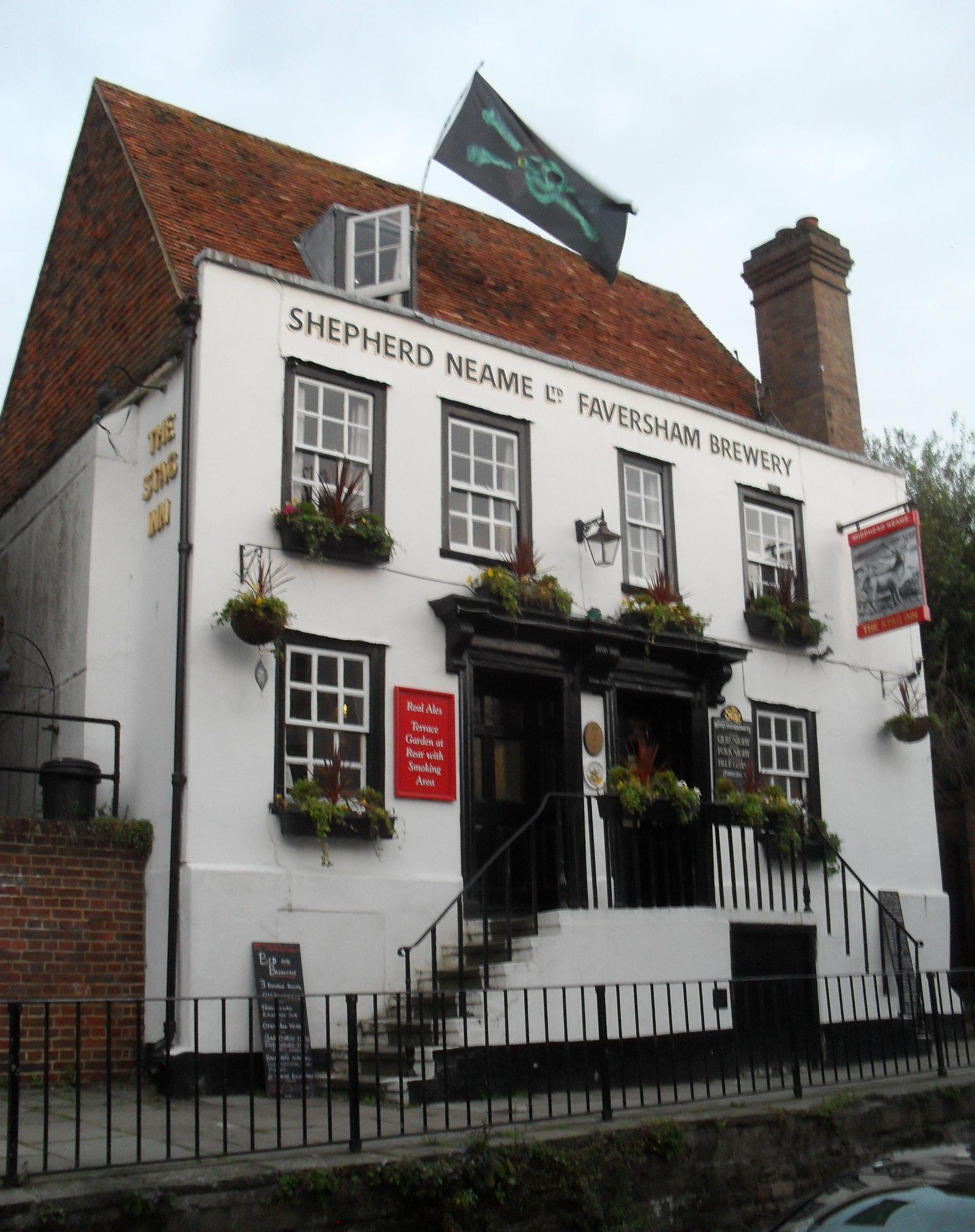
- The inn from the north

- Location of the inn within East Sussex
- 50.8588°N 0.5953°E
- Location: 14 All Saints Street, Old Town, Hastings TN34 3BJ, East Sussex, United Kingdom

History
- Built: 16th century

Site notes
- Architectural style: Vernacular/Neo-Georgian

Listed Building – Grade II
- Official name: The Stag Inn
- Designated: 19 January 1951
- Reference no.: 1043626

The Stag Inn is a public house in the Old Town area of Hastings, a port and seaside resort in East Sussex, England. One of many ancient buildings on All Saints Street, the 16th-century timber-framed inn was refronted in the 18th century, but many of its original features remain. The preserved bodies of two smoke-blackened mummified cats have been displayed on a wall since their discovery in the 19th century; witchcraft has been suggested as an explanation for this "grisly sight". The inn, which claims to be Hastings' oldest surviving pub, is operated as a tied house by the Shepherd Neame Brewery, and has been listed at Grade II by English Heritage for its architectural and historical importance.

== History and description ==
Hastings developed as a fishing port from the 10th century or earlier: its first documented reference in 928 indicates that it was already important locally, and it was soon the leader of the Cinque Ports. Two streams ran into the English Channel between the East and West Hills, steep promontories which forced the town to develop inwards along the valley floor. Two parallel roads, High Street and All Saints Street, ran up the valley and formed the heart of the Old Town area. The oldest surviving buildings on All Saints Street, named after the ancient parish church at the north end, are 15th-century.

The Victoria County History of Sussex identifies only three ancient inns as existing in 1657, but Hastings was in fact infamous for the large number of drinking establishments in its small, crowded central area. Towards the north end of All Saints Street, a timber-framed building erected in the Elizabethan era became a public house known as the Stag Inn at an unknown date—reputedly 1547, which would make it the oldest surviving inn in the town (and slightly older than Elizabethan). Hastings was a centre for smuggling activity for many years, and the inn was apparently frequented by smugglers in its early years.

The façade of the building was altered in the mid-18th century. The upper storey was originally jettied, but the lower storey was built out to bring it in line. New gables and a parapet were added to the roof, and the front elevation was plastered. This work gave the building a Neo-Georgian appearance, although the old timber framing was retained behind this.

The Stag Inn was listed at Grade II by English Heritage on 19 January 1951. This defines it as a "nationally important" building of "special interest". As of February 2001, it was one of 521 Grade II listed buildings, and 535 listed buildings of all grades, in the borough of Hastings. The Old Town area has many listed buildings: there are more than 90 on All Saints Street alone.

The Shepherd Neame Brewery operates the Stag Inn as a tied house. The larger main bar is at the front, with another bar/function room and a beer garden behind. Live music (including bluegrass and a long-established folk night) are offered at various times. Food is available Wednesday dinner, Thursday - Saturday for lunch and dinner and Sunday lunch.

== Mummified cats ==
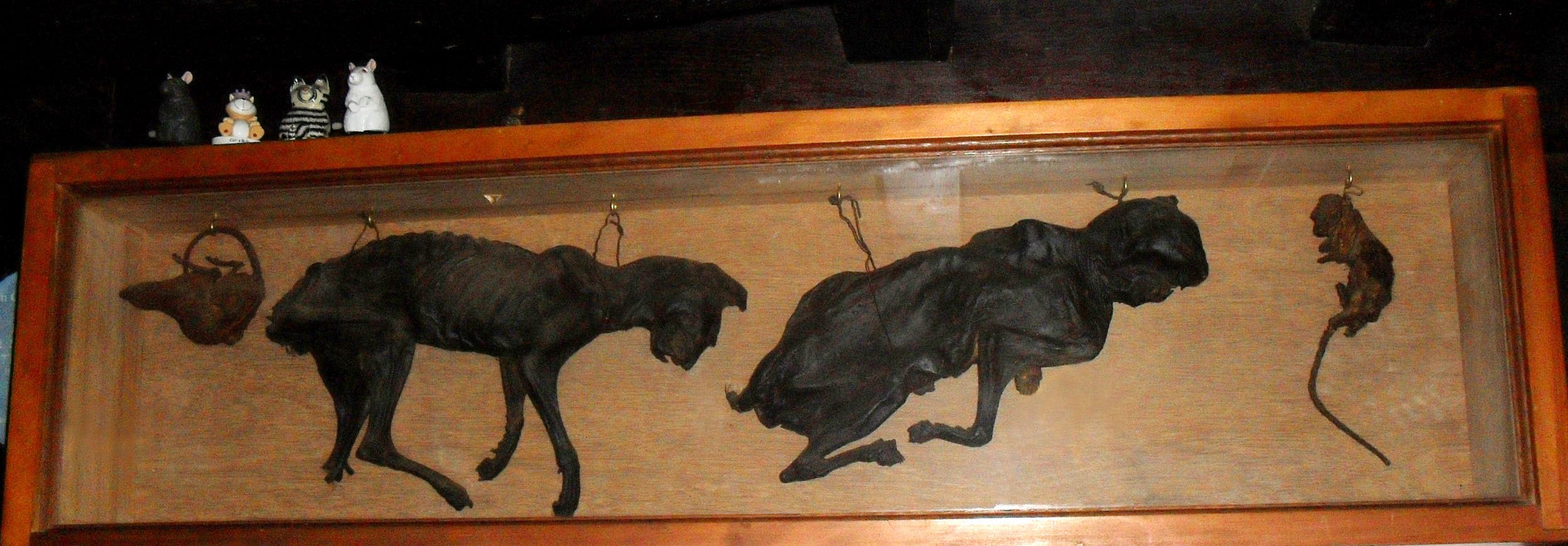
The two cats are displayed in a case on a wall of the inn.

The inn was renovated and altered internally in the 19th century. During this work, builders discovered the mummified bodies of two cats in a blocked-up chimney. Their dried-up bodies had been preserved in a blackened state. Two explanations have been offered: the cats may have entered the chimney and been overcome by smoke from the fireplace, which then prevented their remains decomposing; or they may have been offered as a sacrifice by a witch. Such activities have been reported in other parts of Hastings in the 16th and 17th centuries. An alleged witch named Hannah Clarke is claimed to have put her two cats up the chimney in 1665 and sealed it with a brick wall, in an attempt to ward off plague using witchcraft.

The bodies were displayed in the pub, originally hung from hooks in the main (front) bar. In the 1980s, the delicate remains were placed in a glass-fronted wooden case which was then hung on a wall in the same bar.

== Architecture ==
Like many of the original buildings surviving on All Saints Street, the Stag Inn retains its timber-framed structure-although it is hidden behind the mid 18th-century plastered façade. The building, which stands high above the narrow street on a raised pavement, has two storeys and a five-window range. There is also an attic level lit by a straight-headed dormer window. Most windows are sashes and have moulded sills. The gables on the side walls, added in the 18th century, are faced with tiles. A hipped-roofed timber-framed wing with brick walls extends to the rear. In the main section, the twin entrances have straight-headed hood moulds supported on corbels, with panelled doors reached by stone steps with iron handrails. Inside, there are exposed oak beams with decorative mouldings, and the brackets which originally supported the jettied upper storey survive.
