= The Winchester, Highgate =

UK historic pub

Coordinates: 51°34′25″N 0°08′27″W

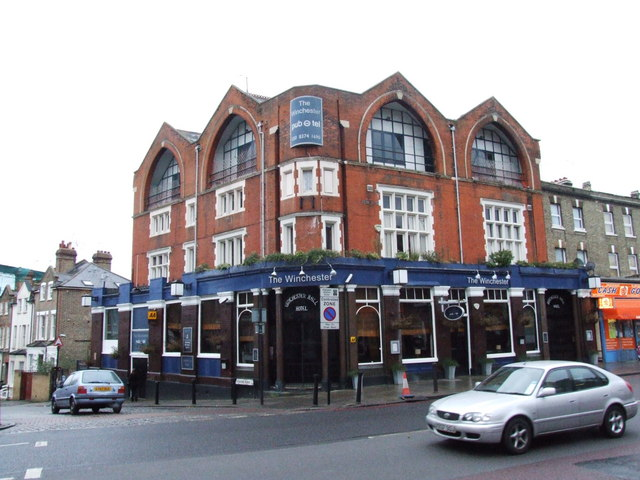
The Winchester

The Winchester is a public house in Highgate, London. It was built in 1881 as the Winchester Tavern, and later became the Winchester Hall Hotel. The name derives from Winchester Hall, a nearby late 17th-century mansion. The pub has featured on the Campaign for Real Ale's National Inventory of Historic Pub Interiors.

In early 2016, locals campaigned to save the pub from a proposed residential redevelopment. The campaign was successful, and the old building frontage remains undeveloped. The Winchester ceased operations as a pub in 2016, but reopened in 2022.
