= Kitchen Bar =

Pub in Belfast, Northern Ireland

Coordinates: 54.600°N 5.925°W

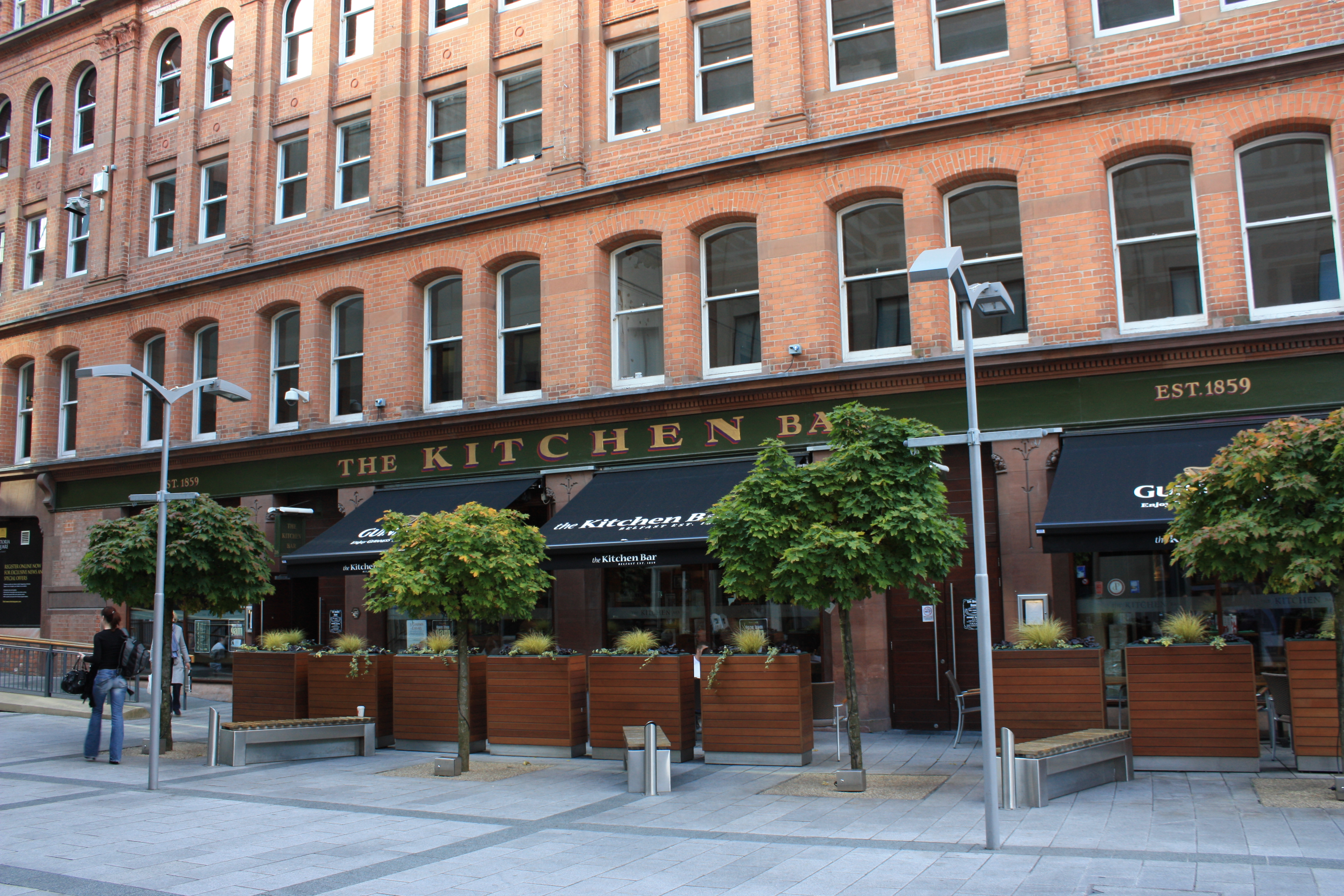
Kitchen Bar, October 2009

The Kitchen Bar is a pub in Belfast, Northern Ireland. It dates back to 1859 but on 30 July 2004, the original building was demolished to make way for Victoria Square, a shopping centre. The original building was a women's boardinghouse prior to its use as a pub. The former Empire Theatre previously stood next to the pub and actors from the theatre would drink there, often leaving behind publicity photographs, which were displayed on the walls.

== Demolition controversy ==
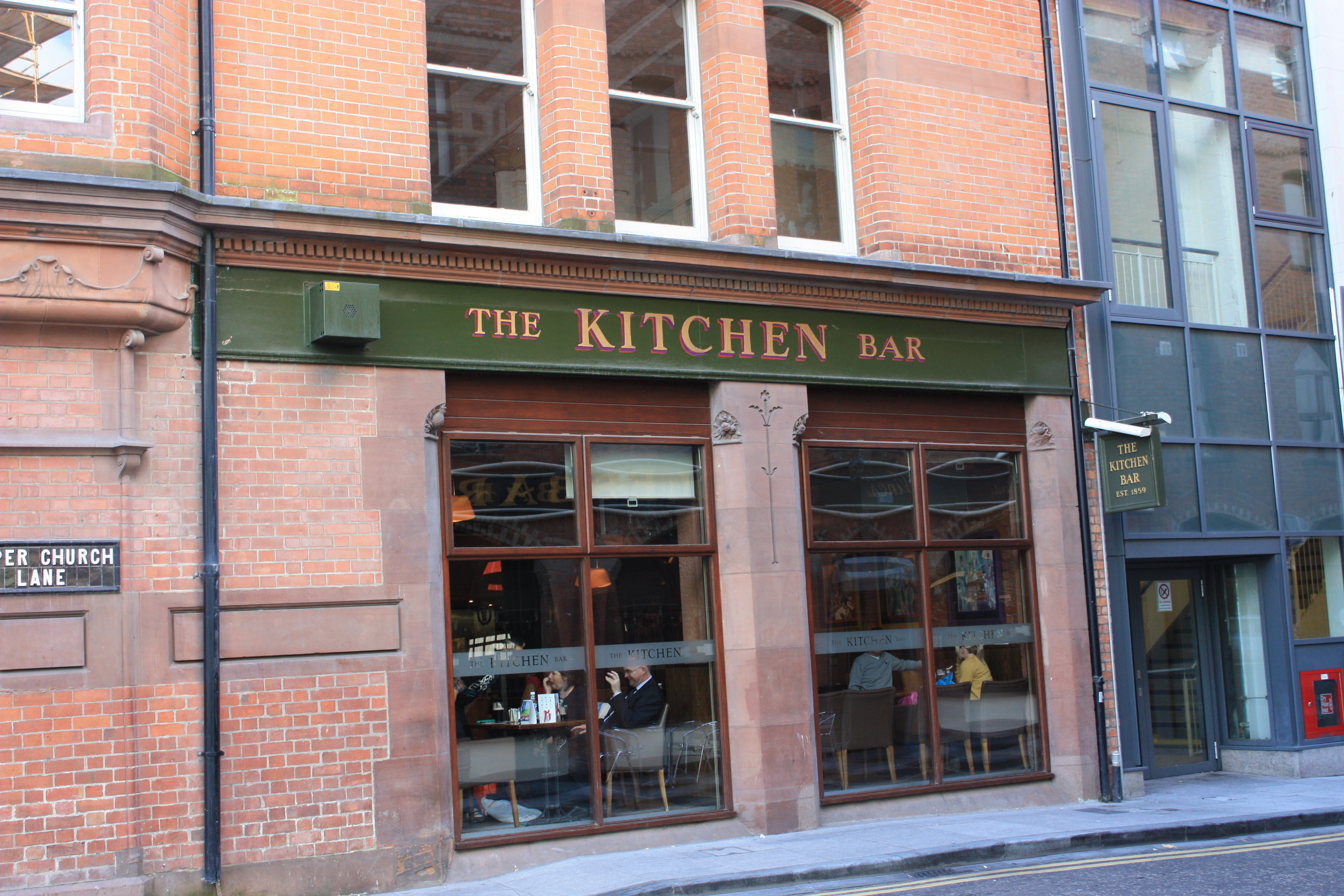
Kitchen Bar, October 2009

The original pub's demolition caused considerable controversy, drawing national newspaper attention. Henry McDonald, writing in The Observer, recalled:

Last Tuesday I said farewell to The Kitchen in the company of one of my closest friends over a few pints of Guinness while watching a small playful dog called Bobbie entertain drinkers at the bar by doing high-fives with his paws. In the soulless anti-septic chrome and glass pubs and cafés of the new Belfast there is no room for the likes of wee Bobbie. Her presence would break every health and safety rule in the book. She would blight the trendy post-modern image of neo-bars in Belfast that look more like a DFS show room with their leather sofas and designer lamps than the interior of one of those traditional little corners of escapism for the working man and woman - the good old dog-friendly smoky pub.

Rita Harkin of the Ulster Architectural Heritage Society stated:

The demise of this 19th century theatre bar is deeply infuriating, given the strength and breadth of opposition. What does it take to get the message across? Rare gems like the Kitchen Bar should be viewed as assets.

According to the Belfast Telegraph, the report of a public inquiry had concluded that the pub shouldn't be demolished, and the Department of the Environment's conservation expert recommended that the planning permission for Victoria Square be made conditional on the incorporation of the pub.

== New pub ==
The Kitchen Bar has moved to a new location on Victoria Square, opposite Bittle's Bar. It was taken over by Botanic Inns in October 2005. The pub hosts regular live traditional music sessions.

== See also ==
- Victoria Square
