= The Coronation Tap =

Ciderhouse in Clifton, Bristol, England

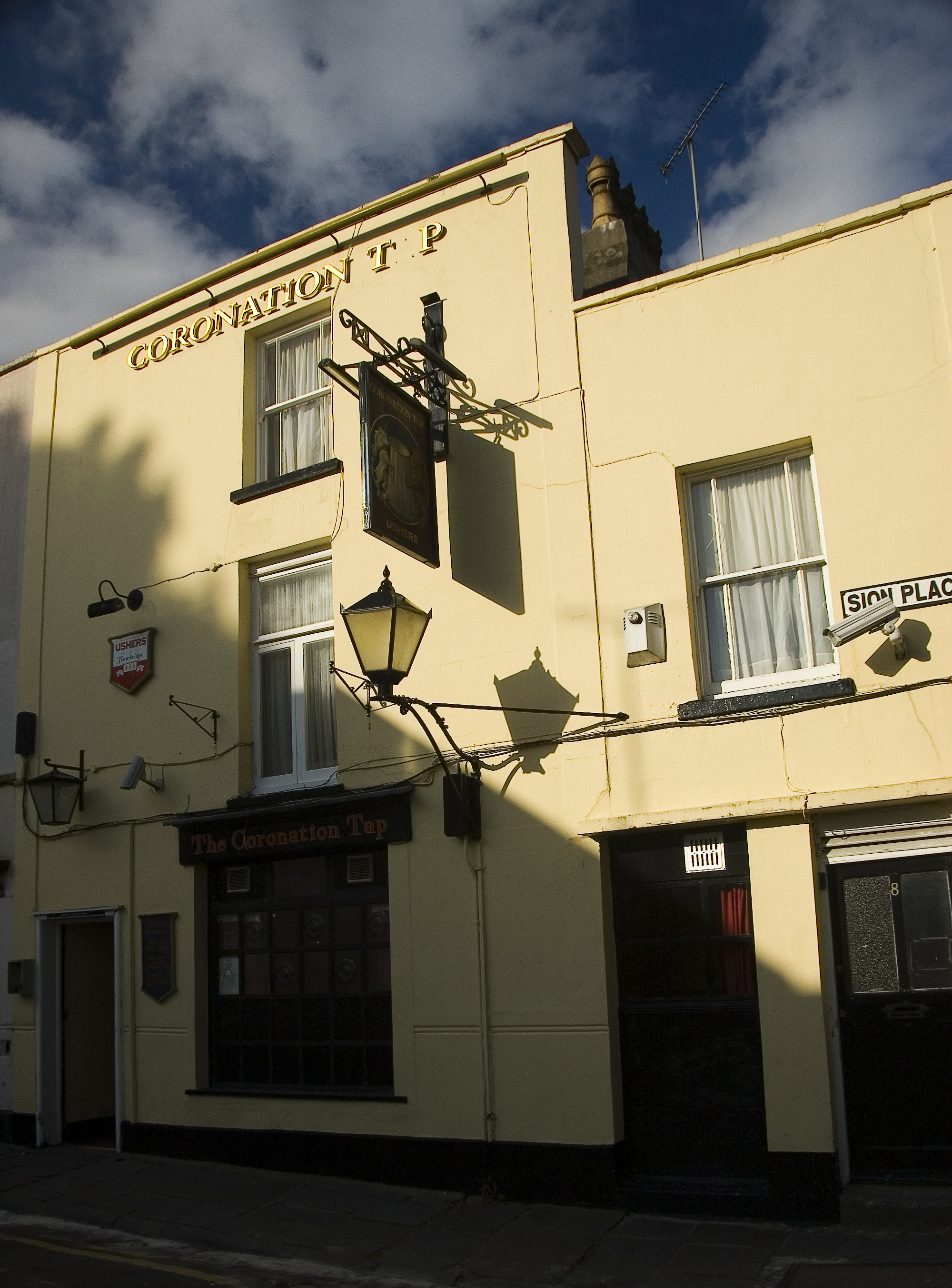
- Interactive map of the The Coronation Tap area

General information
- Location: 8 Sion Place, Clifton, Bristol BS8 4AX
- Coordinates: 51°27′19″N 2°37′22″W
- Opened: pre 1806

Website
- www.thecoronationtap.com

The Coronation Tap is a ciderhouse, a pub that specialises in serving cider, in the Clifton suburb of the English city of Bristol.

The Coronation Tap, or Cori to regulars, has existed under that name for at least two hundred years. It is at least thirty years older than the Clifton Suspension Bridge and was described in 1806 as "a beerhouse with cottage adjoining".

The most popular drink is the strong Exhibition Cider, served in half pints. The pub is popular with students within the city.
