= Old Ship, Aveley =

Public house in Aveley, Essex, England

Coordinates: 51.498485°N 0.257908°E

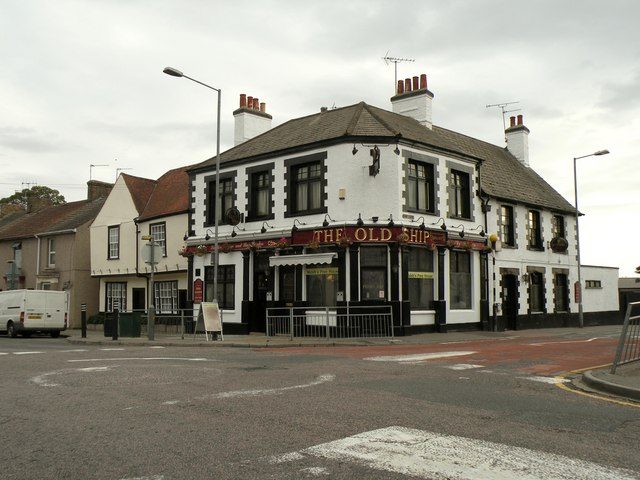
The Old Ship

The Old Ship is a public house in Aveley, Essex, in England. It is on the Campaign for Real Ale's National Inventory of Historic Pub Interiors.
