= The Old Crown, Birmingham =

Pub in Digbeth, Birmingham, England

The Old Crown
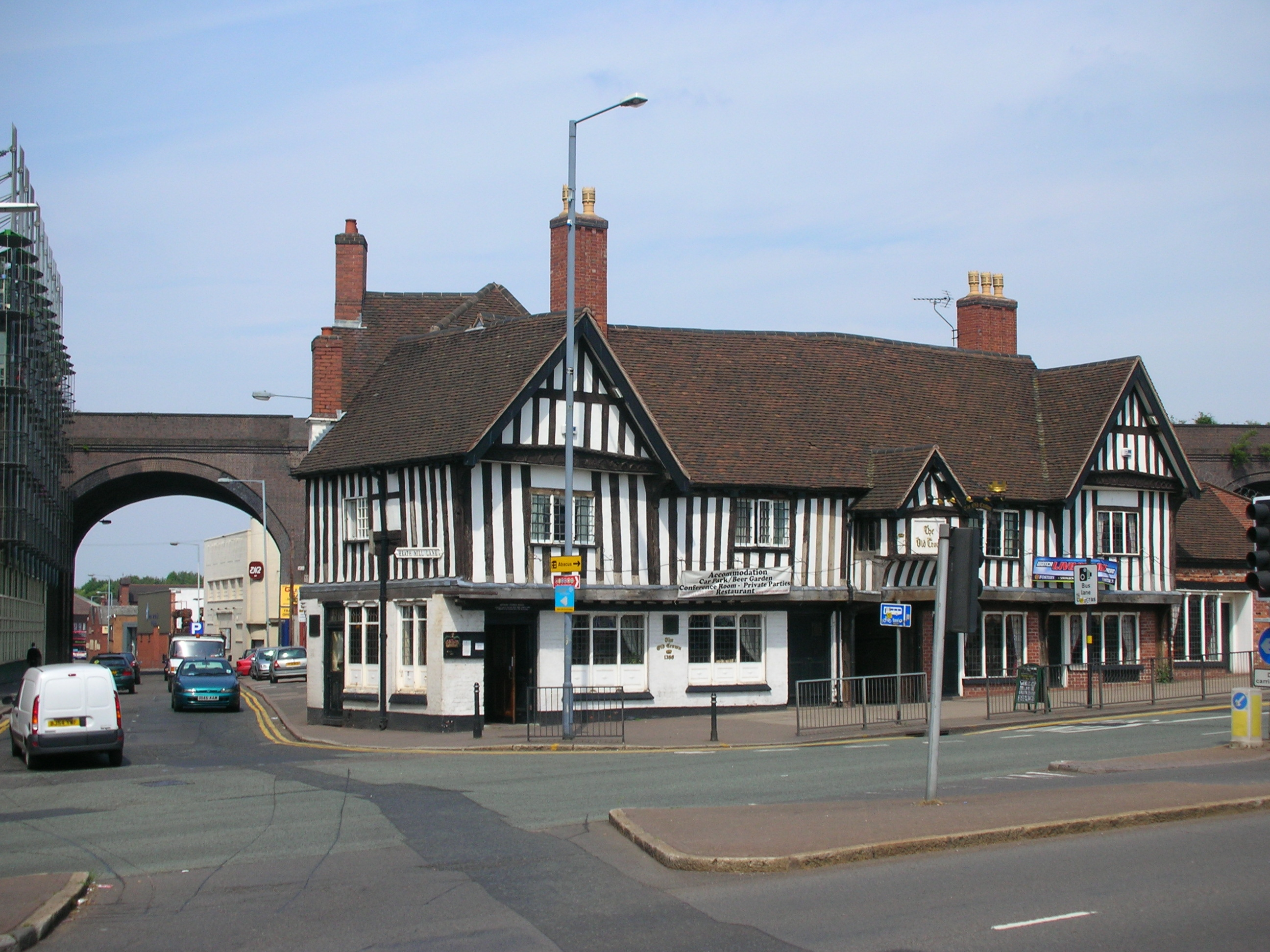
- Interactive map of the The Old Crown area

General information
- Architectural style: Black and white timber frame
- Location: Birmingham, England
- Coordinates: 52.4747°N 1.8836°W
- Completed: 1450-1500

The Old Crown, a pub in Deritend, claims to be one of the oldest extant secular buildings in Birmingham, England. It is Grade II* listed, and claims to date back to c. 1368, retaining its "black and white" timber frame, although almost all of the present building dates from the early 16th century.

== History ==
It is believed the building was constructed between 1450 and 1500 with some evidence dating to 1492 (the same year the Saracen's Head in nearby Kings Norton was completed). John Leland noted the building, upon entering Birmingham, in 1538 as a "mansion house of tymber". It is thought to have been originally built as the Guildhall and School of St John, Deritend. This Guild owned a number of other buildings throughout Warwickshire, including the Guildhall in Henley in Arden. The building was purchased in 1589, by "John Dyckson, alias Bayleys", who, in the 1580s, had been buying a number of properties and lands in "the street called Deritend" and in Bordesley. Described as a tenement and garden, running alongside Heath Mill Lane, the building remained in the Dixon alias Baylis (later Dixon) family for the next hundred years.

In the original deed, John Dyckson is described as a "Caryer", which in the West Midlands at this time, when roads were nothing more than hollow-ways and bridle paths, implied that he owned several trains of packhorses. These would have needed stabling, and Dixon would have needed warehouse space to store goods awaiting dispatch, and arrived goods awaiting collection. Such facilities would be useful to other travellers, and it may well be that the use of the house as an Inn, dates from this time. Indeed, since England was in the grip of a patriotic pother over the failed Armada the previous year, it would have been opportune to adopt the name: 'the Crown'. However, the earliest documentary evidence of the building's use as an Inn is from 1626; and it being "called by the sign of the Crowne", from 1666.

Heated skirmishes were fought around the building when Prince Rupert's forces raided Birmingham during the English Civil War.

The building was converted into two houses in 1684 and then converted into three houses in 1693. It remained three houses until the 19th century. In 1851, Joshua Toulmin Smith saved the Old Crown from demolition when the Corporation proposed demolishing the building in order to "improve the street". Again, in 1856 and 1862, the Corporation proposed to demolish the building; Smith saved the building each time.

In 1991, a local pub company owned by the Brennan family bought the Old Crown. In the summer of 1994, Pat Brennan and his youngest son, Peter, were doing repairs and clearing out the old sheds to the rear of the property when they found the old well, which had been closed off for more than 100 years. Now restored, it is situated at the rear entrance of the pub. At the end of May 1998, under the guidance of Pat and Ellen Brennan and their sons Patrick, Gary and Peter, after the family's £2 million investment into Birmingham's most famous hostelry, The Old Crown was restored to its former glory and reopened.

== Construction ==
The building is 71 ft 4 in (21.74 m) wide and 20 ft 2 in (6.15 m) deep on the ground floor. On the first floor, which overhangs the front, it is 21 ft 9 in (6.63 m) deep. When built, the original building had a central hall with a length of 40 ft (12 m) and a width of 20 ft (6 m). Below this were a number of arched cellars. On the upper floor were just four rooms. The building had a courtyard to its rear which contained a well. It was 26 ft (8 m) deep and surrounded by large stones. The well was excavated and deepened to produce a total depth of 38 ft (12 m). The new section of the well was lined with square bricks. At the top, it was 2 ft 7 in (790 mm) at its narrowest diameter and 2 ft 9 in (840 mm) at its widest diameter. It widened to around 4 ft (1.2 m) at the bottom. The well was cleaned in 1863 and Smith added an iron gate to the top of it to preserve it whilst keeping it accessible.

== See also ==
- List of oldest companies
