= Picture House, Stafford =

Pub and former cinema in Stafford, England

The Picture House
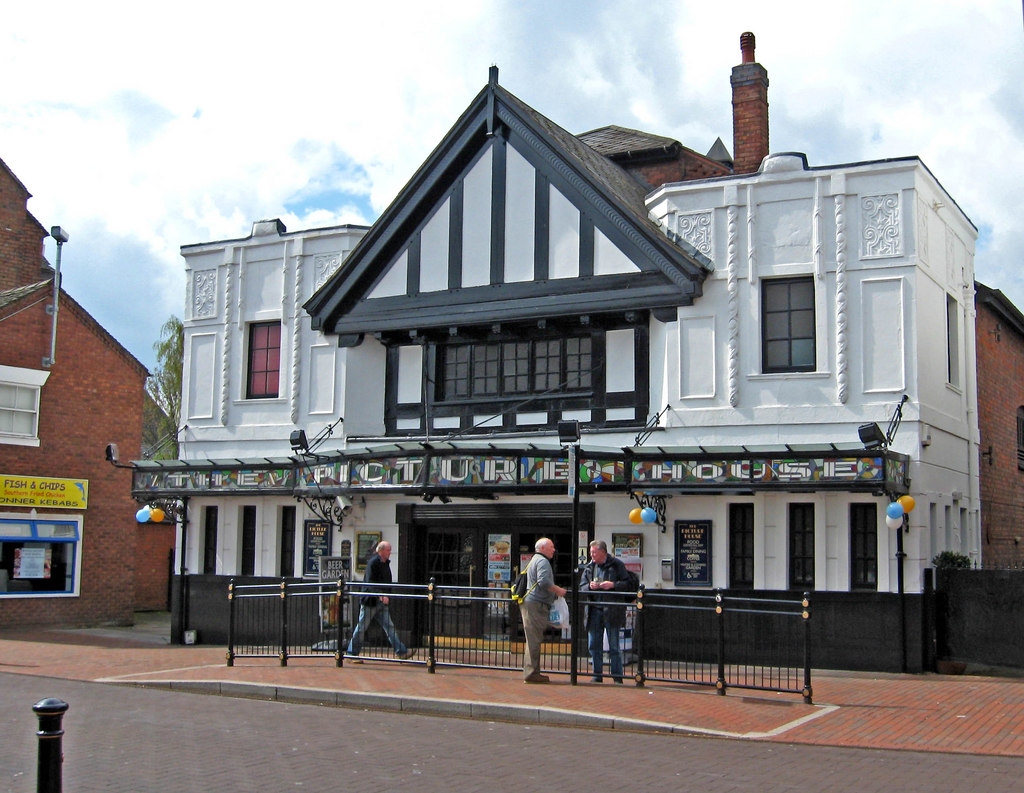
- Interactive map of The Picture House
- 52°48′15.8″N 2°6′58.9″W
- Location: Bridge Street, Stafford
- OS grid reference: SJ 922 230

History
- Built: 1913
- Original use: cinema

Site notes
- Architect(s): Campbell and Fairhurst
- Current use: pub

Listed Building – Grade II
- Designated: 10 August 1988
- Reference no.: 1290182

The Picture House is a pub and former cinema in Stafford, Staffordshire, England. It was built in 1913, and is a Grade II listed building; it is described in the listing as "A good example of an early cinema retaining interior features."

== History and description ==
The cinema was built in 1913 for Goodalls Pictures. The architects were Campbell and Fairhurst.

The brick building has a stucco façade, with a centrally located gable and applied timber framing in Tudor style. The original ticket office has remained. The auditorium has a seven-bay segmented barrel-vaulted ceiling with decorative plaster between the bays.

The first film shown was The House of Temperley, on 23 February 1914. A cinema organ was installed in 1917, and the cinema was later equipped for talkies, of which the first, The Last of Mrs. Cheyney, was shown in 1930.

The cinema was purchased in 1930 by the Everston family, and they operated it until it closed in March 1995. It was purchased by Wetherspoons, and in 1997 it opened as a pub, retaining the name The Picture House.
