= Old Ship, Richmond =

Pub in Richmond, London

Coordinates: 51°27′34.9″N 0°18′23.4″W

The Old Ship
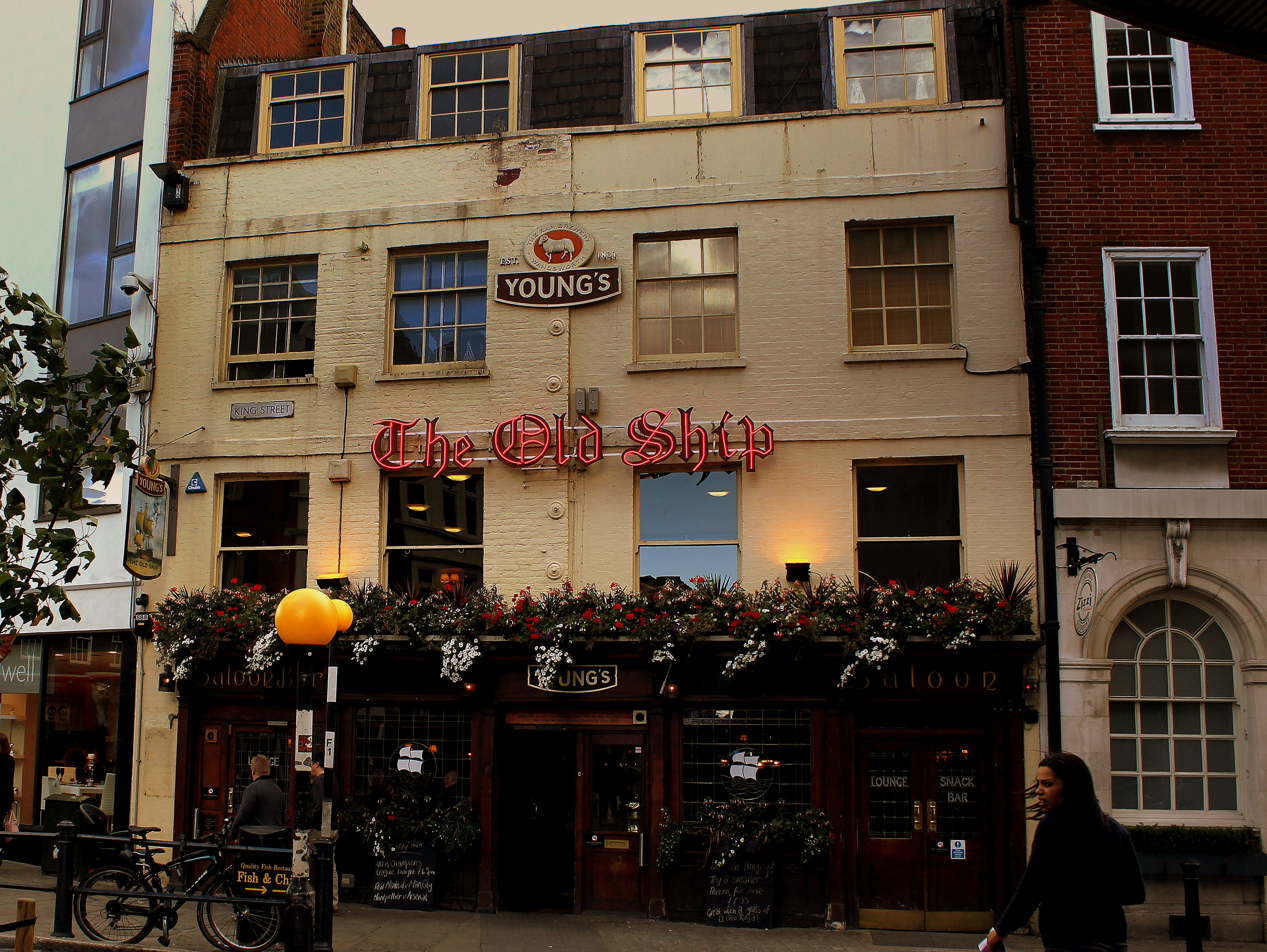

- Location within London Borough of Richmond upon Thames

General information
- Type: Public house
- Location: 3 King Street, Richmond in the London Borough of Richmond upon Thames

Listed Building – Grade II
- Official name: Old Ship Public House
- Designated: 25 June 1983
- Reference no.: 1286531

The Old Ship is a Grade II listed public house at 3 King Street, Richmond in the London Borough of Richmond upon Thames. It was built in the 18th century, and the architect is not known. Prior to 1725 it was known as the Six Bells: it acquired its present name in the 1780s and has been a Young's pub since 1860.
