= Deritend =

Area of Birmingham, England

Coordinates: 52.4753°N 1.8839°W

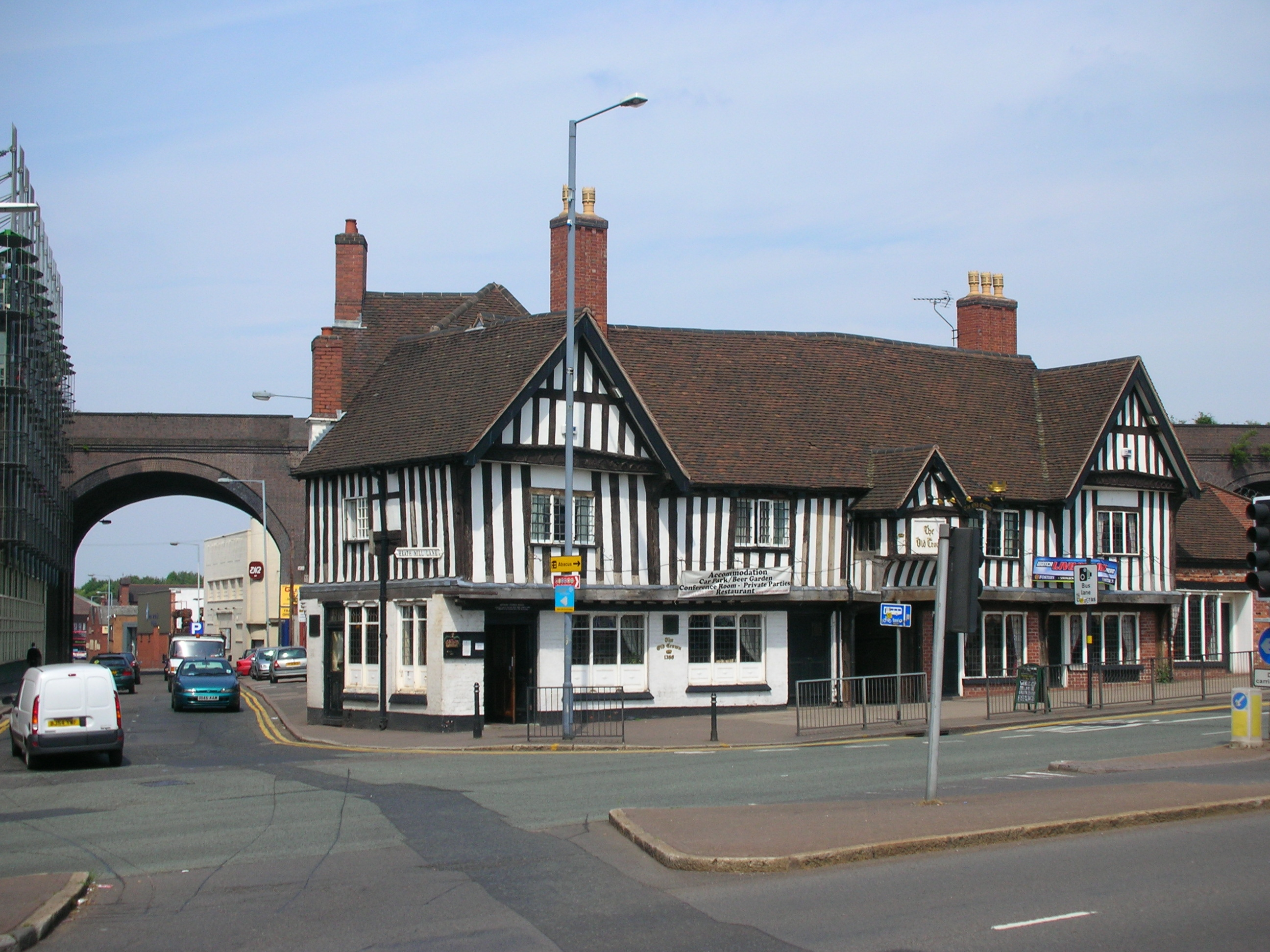
The Old Crown in Deritend is the only surviving medieval building in Birmingham city centre.

Deritend is a historic area of Birmingham, England, built around a crossing point of the River Rea. It is first mentioned in 1276. Today Deritend is usually considered to be part of Digbeth.

== History ==
Deritend was a crossing point of the River Rea before Birmingham was of any significance. When Peter de Bermingham obtained a charter for a market around 1156 the area to the west of the crossing, Digbeth and beyond, grew into what is now Birmingham. Deritend (in the past called Der-yat-end, possibly Deer Gate End) was across the river towards Warwick in the parish of Aston.

Deritend is first mentioned in 1276 when it is reported that an area on the road in the town of Birmingham encroached into an area of land in the parish of Aston. The first mention of Deritend by name is by Sir John de Birmyneham in 1381, who refers to it as 'Duryzatehende'. A further variation occurs in 1430, in a legal record, written in Latin, where it appears as "Durghzatende iuxta Brymyngeham". The letter after the "gh" does not exist in modern English, and differs from the preceding "g".

In 1538, John Leland mentioned in his Itineraries that before reaching Birmingham he passed through "an attractive street of houses inhabited by smiths and cutlers which, as (he) remember(ed), is called Dyrtey." He mentions that it is a hamlet of Aston Parish, completely separate from Birmingham with a brook marking the boundary.

== The Old Crown pub ==
The Old Crown pub in Deritend High Street is claimed to be the oldest extant secular building in Birmingham. It is Grade II* listed, and claims to date back to circa 1368, retaining its "black and white" timber frame, although almost all of the present building dates from the early 16th century.

== Buildings ==
There are a number of notable buildings in Deritend including:

- The Adam & Eve, a public house dating back to the 18th century.
- The Custard Factory, an arts complex.
- St Basil's Centre

Construction work in the area in 1953 uncovered pottery dating to the medieval period. These are now on display in the Birmingham Museum & Art Gallery.

== Notable people ==
- John Rogers, early martyr of the Marian persecution.
