= Andrea Stark =

British art executive (born 1962)

Andrea Stark FRSA
- Born: 1962 (age 63–64)
- Citizenship: British
- Education: Dartington College of Arts; University of Birmingham
- Occupation: Arts executive
- Employer: London Borough of Islington
- Known for: Leadership roles at Arts Council England, High House Production Park, and Foundation for Future London
- Title: Director of Employment, Skills and Culture
- Awards: Honorary degree, University of Essex (2015)

Andrea Stark (born August 1962) is a British arts executive. She was chief executive of High House Purfleet, director of the Foundation for Future London, the organisation responsible for developing the Queen Elizabeth Olympic Park as a new cultural and educational district and is currently Director of Employment, Skills and Culture at the London Borough of Islington. She was previously executive director of Arts Council England, chief executive of East England Arts, and chief officer of arts and culture at Dundee City Council. The financial arrangements for her departure from Arts Council England for High House Production Park caused some adverse comment in the arts press. Her appointment was announced by High House chairman Tony Hall, now director general of the BBC.

== Early life ==
Stark grew up in the North-East of England, where she attended school. She studied theatre at Dartington College of Arts, later moving to postgraduate study at the University of Birmingham.

== Career ==
Stark first worked in theatre before becoming the arts chief for the City of Sunderland and later Dundee City Council, where she worked on major regeneration programmes using the creative industries to drive local economic growth. At Dundee, she was key in ensuring £5.6 million in National Lottery funding for the Dundee Centre for Contemporary Arts, the largest award to a Scottish institution at that point, and was suggested as a possible head of the Scottish Arts Council.

In 1999, she became Chief Executive of the Eastern Arts Board, the Arts Council England Executive Director for the East and South East, and a member of their National Executive Board. Whilst in this post, "she devised a highly successful investment strategy that generated over £125 million for a series of world class arts centres". In 2012, Stark left to become Chief Executive of the new High House Purfleet in Essex. There, she led the team that created a national centre of excellence for creative industries. The purpose-built centre is shared by other organisations such as the Royal Opera House, Creative & Cultural Skills and Acme Studios, and built on work Stark had done to support redevelopment while at the Arts Council.

After the end of the 2012 London Olympics, a body was set up to redevelop the Queen Elizabeth Olympic Park in east London into a new cultural and educational hub as part of the Mayor of London's 'Olympicopolis' project. Stark was appointed its first director in June 2016.

Stark was awarded an honorary degree by the University of Essex in June 2015.
