= Royal Opera House =

Performing arts venue in London, England

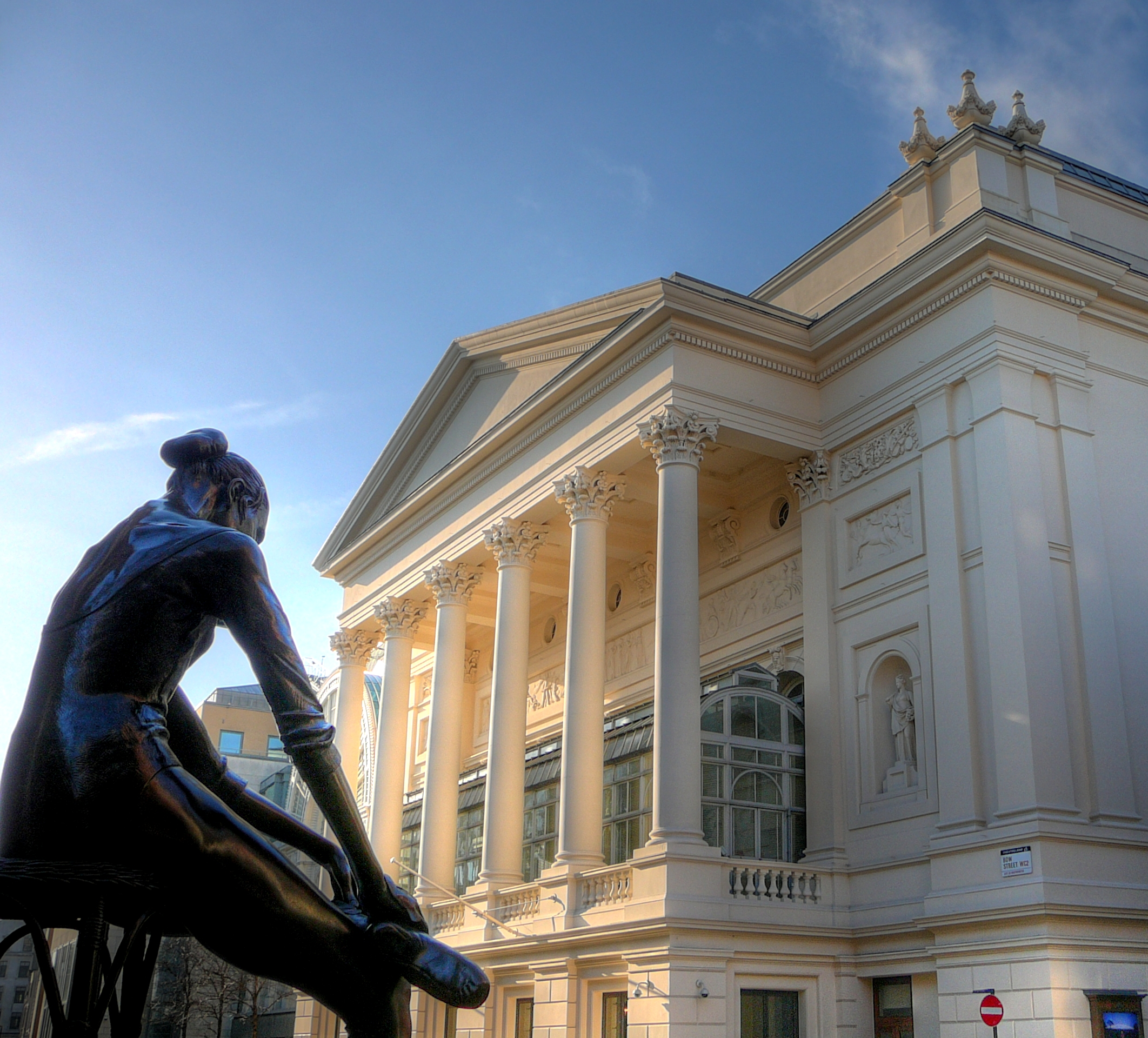
- Bow Street frontage with Plazzotta's statue, Young Dancer, in the foreground

- Location within Central London Location within the United Kingdom
- Former names: Theatre Royal, Covent Garden (until 1892)
- Address: Bow Street
- Location: London, WC2
- Coordinates: 51°30′47″N 0°07′22″W
- Owner: Royal Opera House Covent Garden Foundation
- Capacity: 2,256 (main auditorium)
- Type: Opera house
- Designation: Grade I
- Public transit: Covent Garden; Bus: 6, 11, 14, 26, 59, 98, 139, 168, 176

Construction
- Built: 1728–1732 (original building)
- Opened: 7 December 1732; 293 years ago
- Architects: Edward Shepherd (original building); Edward Middleton Barry (current building)
- Builder: Lucas Brothers (current building)

Tenants
- The Royal Ballet; The Royal Opera

Website
- rbo.org.uk

The Royal Opera House (ROH) is a theatre in Covent Garden, central London. The building is often referred to as simply Covent Garden, after a previous use of the site. The ROH is the main home of The Royal Opera, The Royal Ballet, and the Orchestra of the Royal Opera House, which are known collectively as the Royal Ballet and Opera.

The first theatre on the site, the Theatre Royal (1732), served primarily as a playhouse for the first hundred years of its history. In 1734, the first ballet was presented. A year later, the first season of operas, by George Frideric Handel, began. Many of his operas and oratorios were specifically written for Covent Garden and had their premieres there.

The current building is the third theatre on the site, following disastrous fires in 1808 and 1856 to previous buildings. The façade, foyer, and auditorium date from 1858, but almost every other element of the present complex dates from an extensive reconstruction in the 1990s.

The main auditorium seats 2,256 people, making it the third largest in London, and consists of four tiers of boxes and balconies and the amphitheatre gallery. The proscenium is 14.80 metres (48 ft 7 in) wide, with the stage of the same depth and 12.20 metres (40 ft 0 in) high. The main auditorium is a Grade I listed building.

The Royal Opera House companies were rebranded as the Royal Ballet and Opera in 2024, but the building retains the title of The Royal Opera House.

== History ==
=== Davenant patent ===
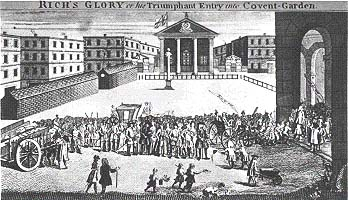
"Rich's Glory": John Rich seemingly invades his new Covent Garden Theatre. (caricature by William Hogarth)

The foundation of the Theatre Royal, Covent Garden lies in the letters patent awarded by Charles II to Sir William Davenant in 1662, allowing Davenant to operate one of only two patent theatre companies (The Duke's Company) in London. The letters patent remained in the possession of the patentees' heirs until the 19th century. Their whereabouts were unknown for some time, but as of 2019 they are held in the Rosenbach Museum & Library, Philadelphia. (Note: The original letters patent by Charles II, 15 January 1661/2 (illuminated, on vellum), authorizing Sir William Davenant to form a company of actors, are held in the Rosenbach Museum & Library, Philadelphia. The charter is illustrated in Clive E. Driver, A Selection from our Shelves: Books, manuscripts and drawings from the Philip H. & A.S.W. Rosenbach Foundation Museum (Philadelphia, 1973), No. 44. A highly reduced facsimile also appeared in The Sunday Times, 5 December 1982. Source: "The Rosenbach Museum & Library, numbers 1 through 239". Catalogue of English Literary Manuscripts (CELM).)

=== First theatre ===
The first theatre before the fire of 1808

In 1728, John Rich, actor-manager of the Duke's Company at Lincoln's Inn Fields Theatre, commissioned The Beggar's Opera from John Gay. The success of this venture provided him with the capital to build the Theatre Royal (designed by Edward Shepherd) at the site of an ancient convent garden. Inigo Jones had developed part of this property in the 1630s with a piazza and St Paul's church (now known colloquially as the actors' church). In addition, a royal charter had created a fruit and vegetable market in the area, a market which survived in that location until 1974.

At the opening of the theatre on 7 December 1732, Rich was carried by his actors in procession into the building for its inaugural production of William Congreve's The Way of the World.

During its first century, the theatre was operated primarily as a playhouse, with the Letters Patent granted by Charles II giving the Theatre Royal, Covent Garden and Theatre Royal, Drury Lane exclusive rights to present spoken drama in London. Despite the frequent interchangeability between the two companies, competition was intense, and the companies often presented the same plays at the same time. Rich introduced pantomime to the repertoire, performing himself, under the stage name John Lun, as Harlequin. A tradition of seasonal pantomime continued at the modern theatre until 1939.

In 1734, the theatre presented its first ballet, Pygmalion. Marie Sallé discarded tradition and her corset and danced in diaphanous robes. Around the same time, the auditorium ceiling was painted by Jacopo Amigoni as The Muses presenting Shakespeare to Apollo, which prompted a brief press dispute: The Weekly Register criticised the work as obscure and over-ornamented, while the rival Grub Street Journal printed point-by-point replies defending Amigoni. George Frideric Handel was named musical director of the company at Lincoln's Inn Fields in 1719, but his first season of opera for the theatre was not presented until 1734. His first opera was Il pastor fido, followed by Ariodante (1735), and the première of Alcina, and Atalanta the following year. In 1743 there was a royal performance of Messiah; its success resulted in a tradition of Lenten oratorio performances. From 1735 until his death in 1759, Handel gave regular seasons at the theatre; many of his operas and oratorios were written for that venue or had their first London performances there. He bequeathed his organ to John Rich, and it was placed in a prominent position on the stage. It was among many valuable items lost in a fire that destroyed the theatre on 20 September 1808. In 1792 the architect Henry Holland rebuilt the auditorium; he expanded its capacity within the existing shell of the building.

=== Second theatre ===
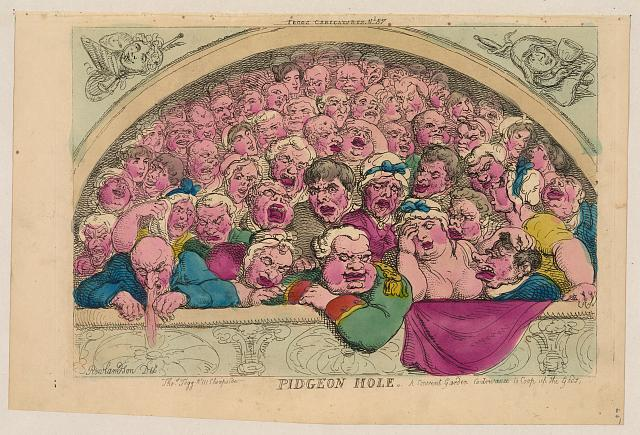
Satirical drawing, 1811, of the "Pigeon Holes" flanking the upper gallery

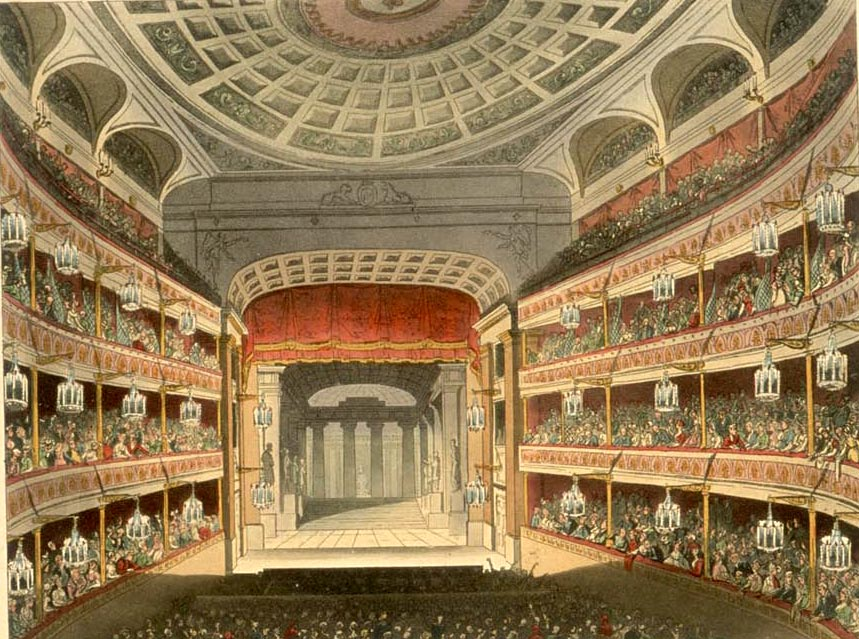
Auditorium of the second theatre, 1810

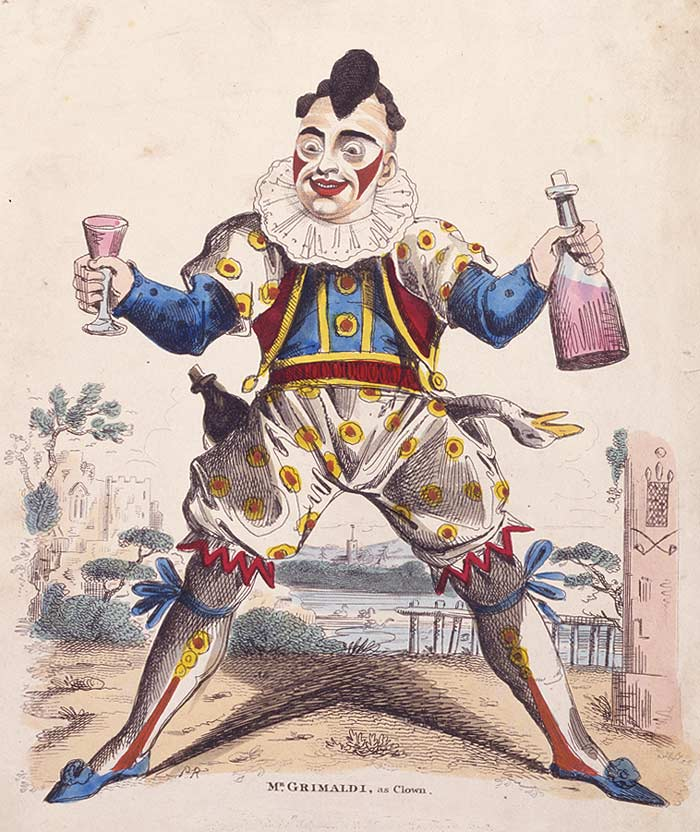
Joseph Grimaldi, as Clown

Rebuilding began in December 1808, and the second Theatre Royal, Covent Garden (designed by Robert Smirke) opened on 18 September 1809 with a performance of Macbeth followed by a musical entertainment called The Quaker. The actor-manager John Philip Kemble, raised seat prices to help recoup the cost of rebuilding and the cost of an increased ground rent introduced by the landowner, John Russell, 6th Duke of Bedford, but the move was so unpopular that audiences disrupted performances by beating sticks, hissing, booing and dancing. The Old Price Riots lasted over two months, and the management was finally forced to accede to the audience's demands.

During this time, entertainment was varied; opera and ballet were presented, but not exclusively. Kemble engaged in a variety of acts, including the child performer Master Betty; the great clown Joseph Grimaldi made his name at Covent Garden. Many famous actors of the day appeared at the theatre, including the tragediennes Sarah Siddons and Eliza O'Neill, the Shakespearean actors William Macready, Edmund Kean and his son Charles. On 25 March 1833 Edmund Kean collapsed on stage while playing Othello, and died two months later.

In 1806, the pantomime clown Joseph Grimaldi (The Garrick of Clowns) had performed his greatest success in Harlequin and Mother Goose; or the Golden Egg at Covent Garden, and this was subsequently revived, at the new theatre. Grimaldi was an innovator: his performance as Joey introduced the clown to the world, building on the existing role of Harlequin derived from the Commedia dell'arte. His father had been ballet-master at Drury Lane, and his physical comedy, his ability to invent visual tricks and buffoonery, and his ability to poke fun at the audience were extraordinary.

Early pantomimes were performed as mimes accompanied by music, but as Music hall became popular, Grimaldi introduced the pantomime dame to the theatre and was responsible for the tradition of audience singing. By 1821 dance and clowning had taken such a physical toll on Grimaldi that he could barely walk, and he retired from the theatre. By 1828, he was penniless; Drury Lane held a benefit concert for him after Covent Garden refused.

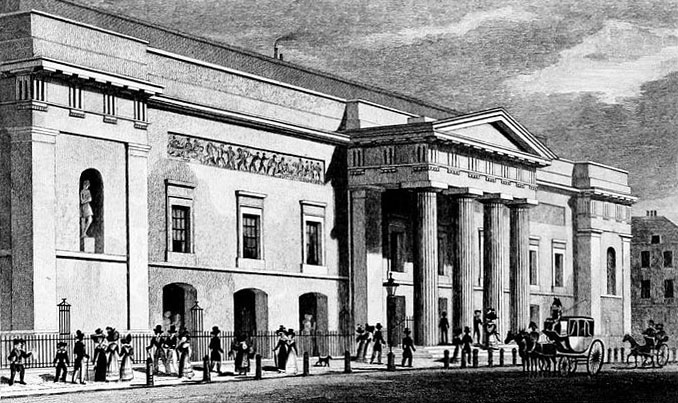
The theatre in the 1820s

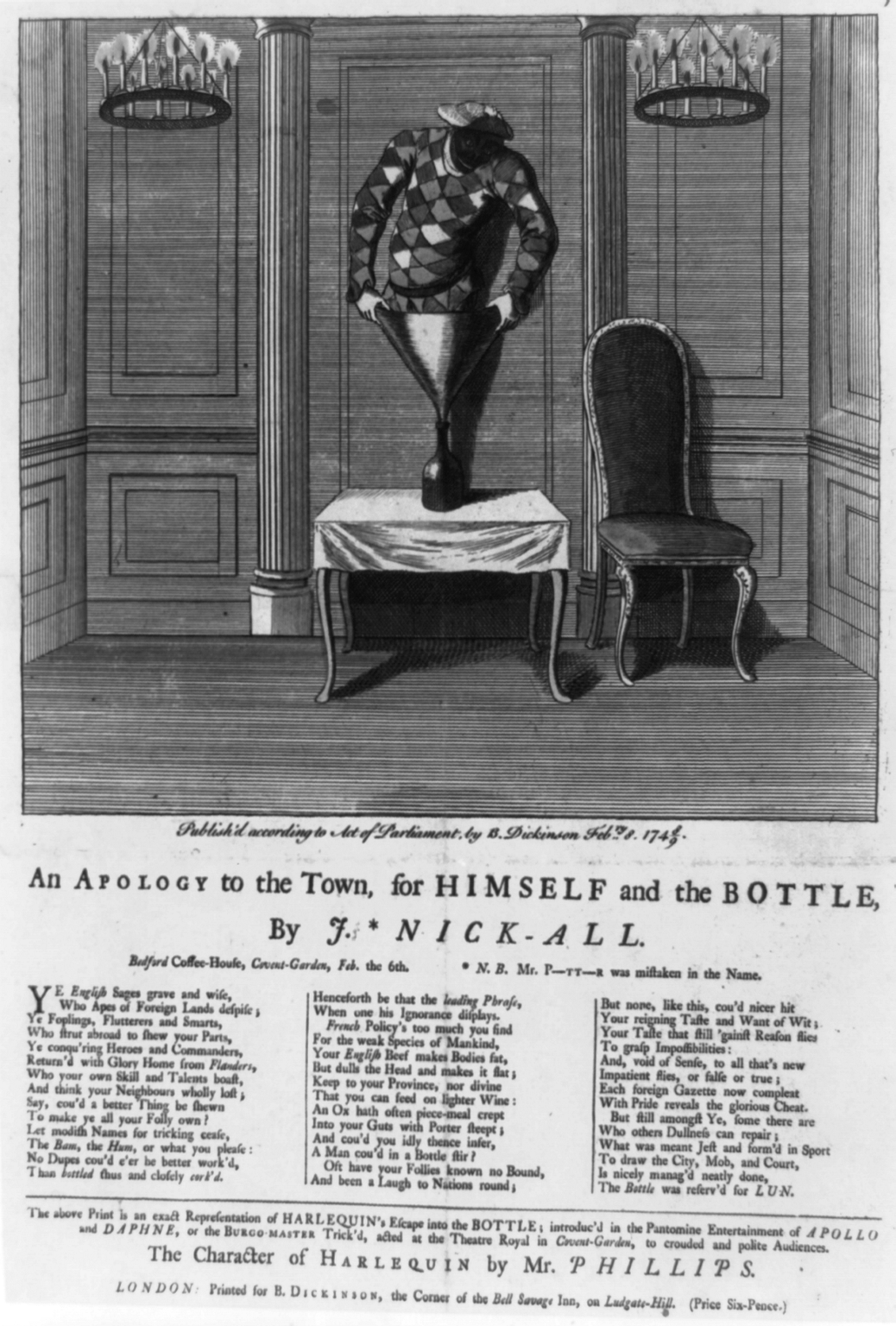
Harlequin's escape into the bottle (print)

In 1817, bare flame gaslight had replaced the former candles and oil lamps that lighted the Covent Garden stage. This was an improvement, but in 1837 Macready employed limelight in the theatre for the first time, during a performance of a pantomime, Peeping Tom of Coventry. Limelight used a block of quicklime heated by an oxygen and hydrogen flame. This allowed the use of spotlights to highlight performers on the stage.

The Theatres Act 1843 broke the patent theatres' monopoly of drama. At that time Her Majesty's Theatre in the Haymarket was the main centre of ballet and opera but after a dispute with the management in 1846 Michael Costa, conductor at Her Majesty's, transferred his allegiance to Covent Garden, bringing most of the company with him. The auditorium was completely remodeled after an 1856 fire, during the following 1856–57 seasons, the company performed at the Lyceum Theatre. The theatre reopened as the Royal Italian Opera on 6 April 1857 with a performance of Rossini's Semiramide.

In 1852, Louis Antoine Jullien, the French eccentric composer of light music and conductor presented an opera of his own composition, Pietro il Grande. Five performances were given of the 'spectacular', including live horses on the stage and very loud music. Critics considered it a complete failure and Jullien was ruined and fled to America.

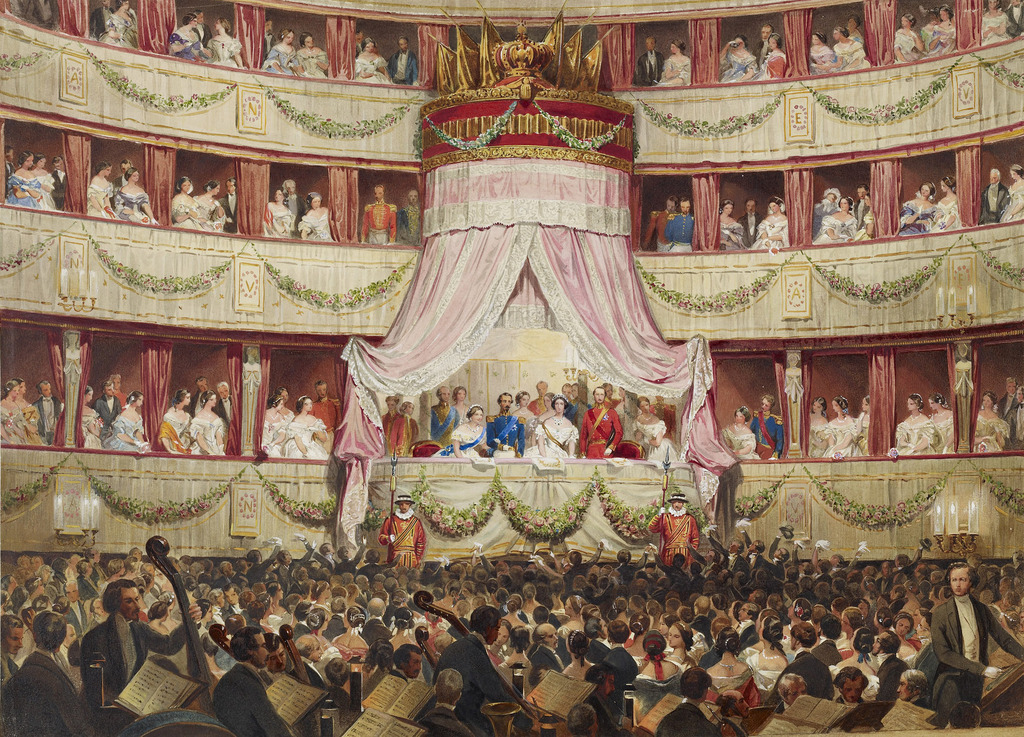
Queen Victoria and Napoleon III at the second (1809–1856) Royal Opera House (18 or 19 April 1855)

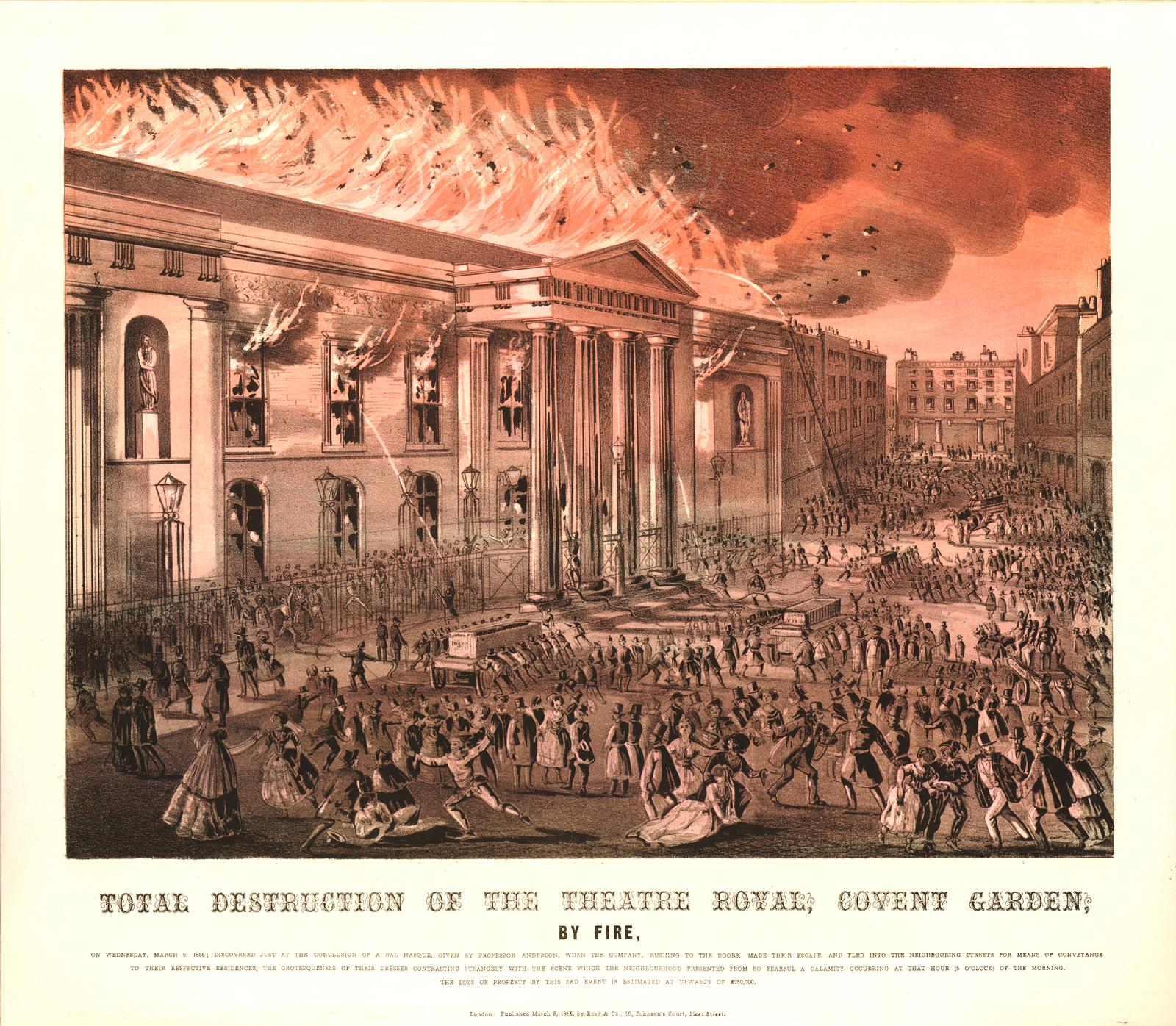
The fire of 5 March 1856

Costa and his successors presented all operas in Italian, even those originally written in French, German or English, until 1892, when Gustav Mahler presented the debut of Wagner's Ring cycle at Covent Garden. The word "Italian" was then quietly dropped from the name of the opera house.

The conjuror John Henry Anderson, who had exposed the Davenport brothers, leased the theatre to stage his shows which were critical of mediums and spiritualism. After a gala performance and bal masqué organised by Anderson, the theatre caught fire in the early hours of 5 March 1856 and was destroyed.

=== Third theatre ===
Work on a third theatre, designed by Edward Middleton Barry, started in 1857, and the new building, which remains as the nucleus of the present theatre, was built by Lucas Brothers and opened on 15 May 1858 with a performance of Meyerbeer's Les Huguenots.

The Royal English Opera company under the management of Louisa Pyne and William Harrison, made their last performance at Theatre Royal, Drury Lane, on 11 December 1858 and took up residence at Covent Garden on 20 December 1858 with the premiere of Michael Balfe's Satanella – the first opera to have its world premiere at the new theatre – and continued there until 1865.

The theatre became the Royal Opera House (ROH) in 1892, and the number of French and German works offered increased. Winter and summer seasons of opera and ballet were given, and the building was also used for pantomime, recitals and political meetings.

During the First World War, the theatre was requisitioned by the Ministry of Works for use as a furniture repository.

From 1934 to 1936, Geoffrey Toye was managing director, working alongside the artistic director Sir Thomas Beecham. Despite early successes, Toye and Beecham eventually fell out, and Toye resigned.

During the Second World War the ROH became a dance hall. There was a possibility that it would remain so after the war but, following lengthy negotiations, the music publishers Boosey & Hawkes acquired the lease of the building. David Webster was appointed General Administrator, and Sadler's Wells Ballet was invited to become the resident ballet company. The Covent Garden Opera Trust was created and laid out plans "to establish Covent Garden as the national centre of opera and ballet, employing British artists in all departments, wherever that is consistent with the maintenance of the best possible standards ..."

The Royal Opera House reopened on 20 February 1946 with a performance of The Sleeping Beauty in an extravagant new production designed by Oliver Messel. Webster, with his music director Karl Rankl, immediately began to build a resident company. In December 1946, they shared their first production, Purcell's The Fairy-Queen, with the ballet company. On 14 January 1947, the Covent Garden Opera Company gave its first performance of Bizet's Carmen.

Before the grand opening, the Royal Opera House presented one of the Robert Mayer Children's concerts on Saturday, 9 February 1946.

=== Reconstruction from the 1980s forward ===
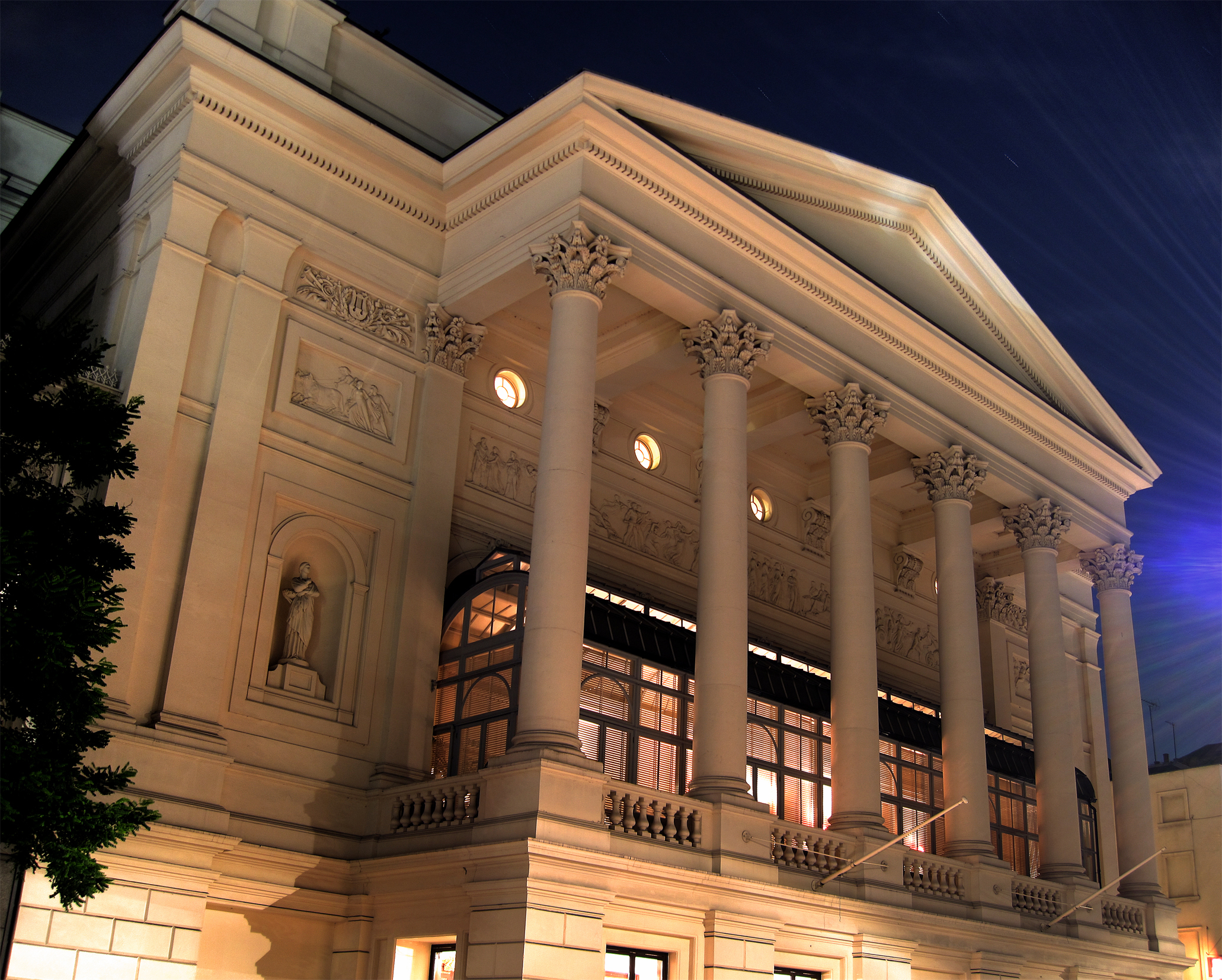
The Royal Opera House, Bow Street Façade, after reconstruction

Several renovations had taken place to parts of the house in the 1960s, including improvements to the amphitheatre but the theatre clearly needed a major overhaul. In 1975 the Labour government gave land adjacent to the Royal Opera House for a long-overdue modernisation, refurbishment, and extension. In the early 1980s, the first part of a major renovation included an extension to the rear of the theatre on the James Street corner. The development added two new ballet studios, offices, a Chorus Rehearsal Room and the Opera Rehearsal room. Dressing rooms were also added.

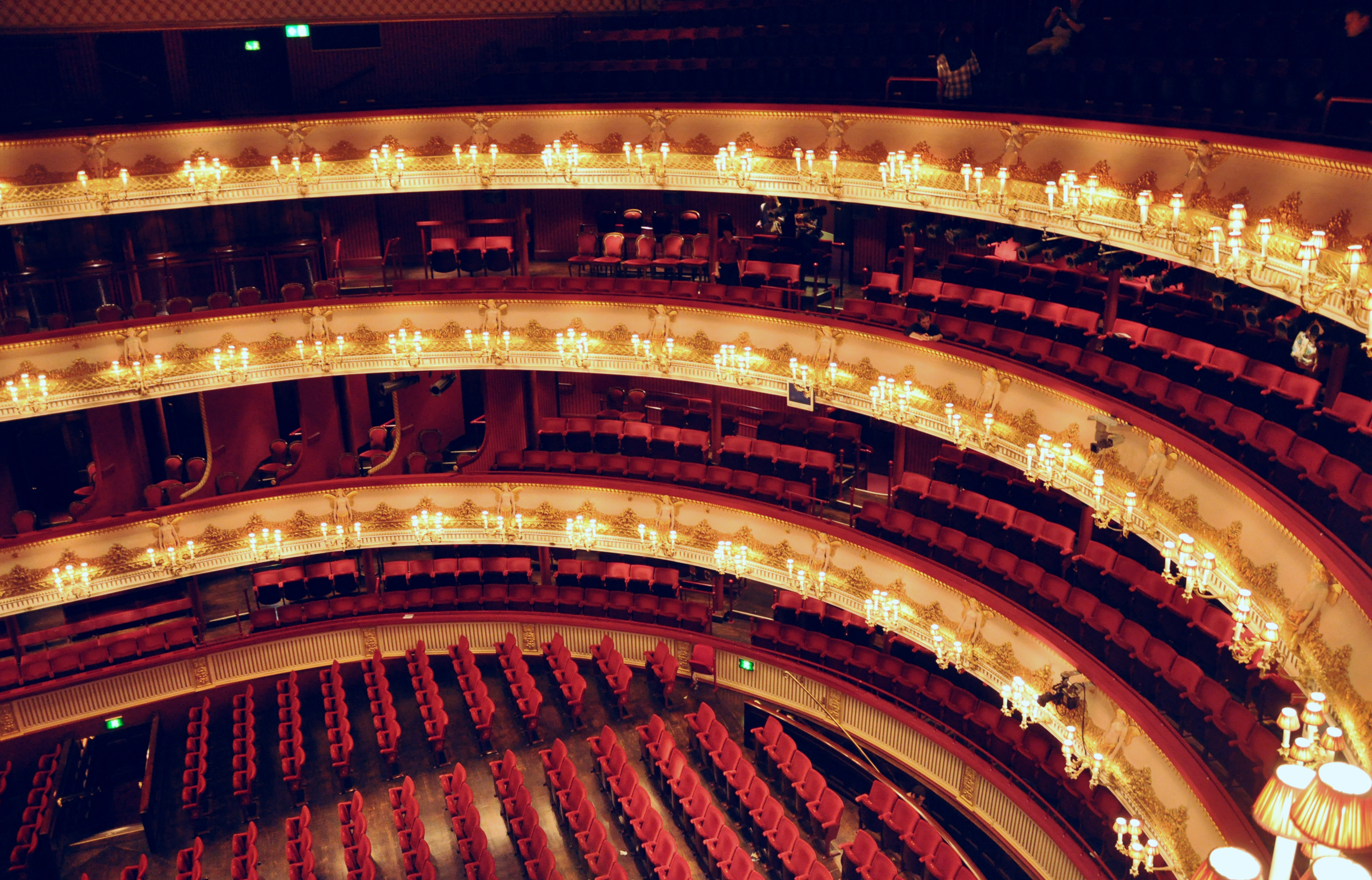
The Royal Opera House auditorium, stage to the left

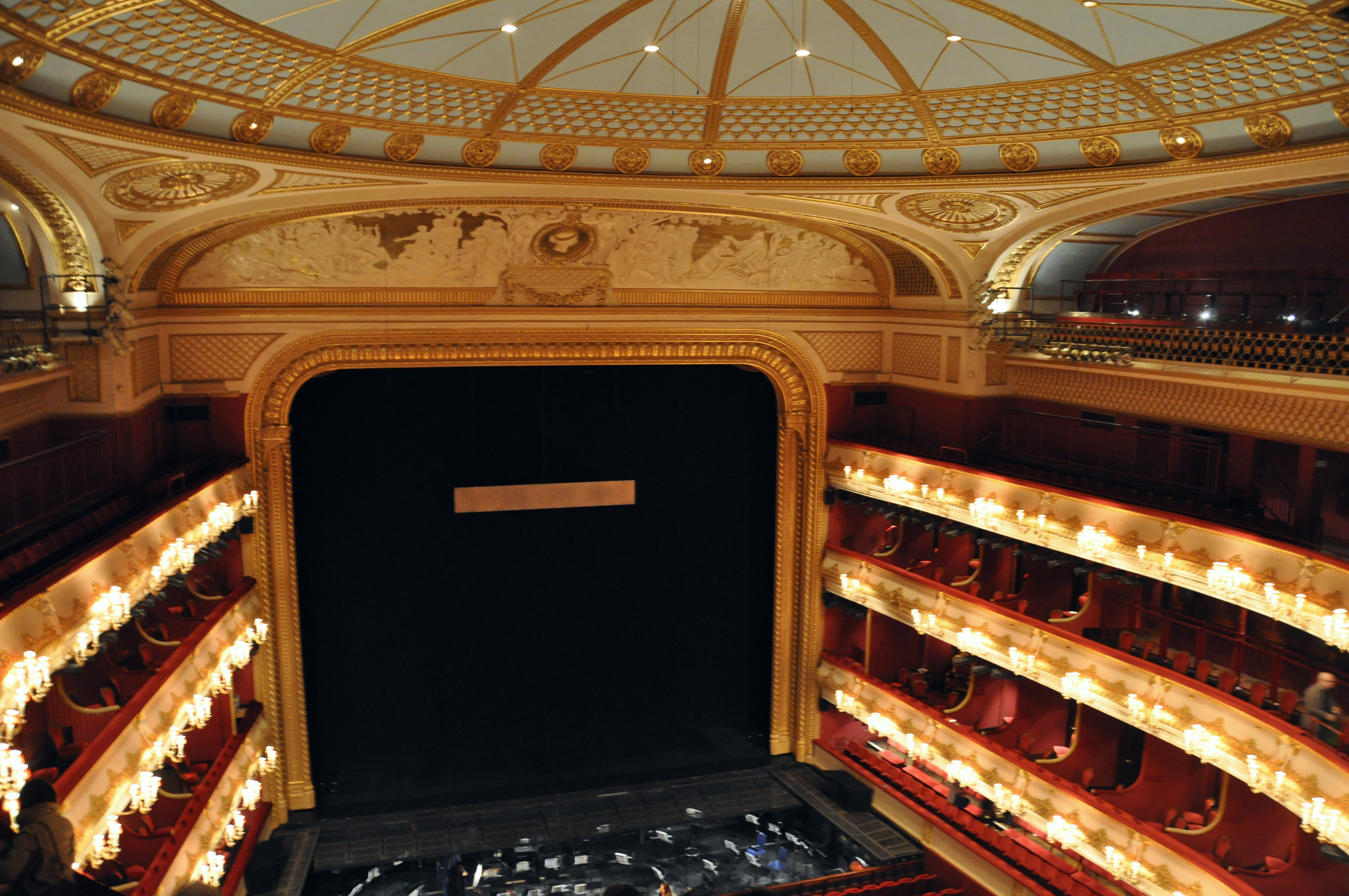
Facing the stage from the Amphitheatre

By 1995, sufficient funds from the Arts Lottery through Arts Council England and private fundraising had been raised to enable the company to embark upon a major £213 million reconstruction of the building by Carillion, which took place between 1997 and 1999, under the chairmanship of Sir Angus Stirling. This involved the demolition of almost the whole site including several adjacent buildings to make room for a major increase in the size of the complex. The auditorium itself remained, but well over half of the complex was new.

The design team was led by Jeremy Dixon and Edward Jones of Dixon Jones BDP as architects. The acoustic designers were Rob Harris and Jeremy Newton of Arup Acoustics. The building engineer was Arup with Stanhope as developer.

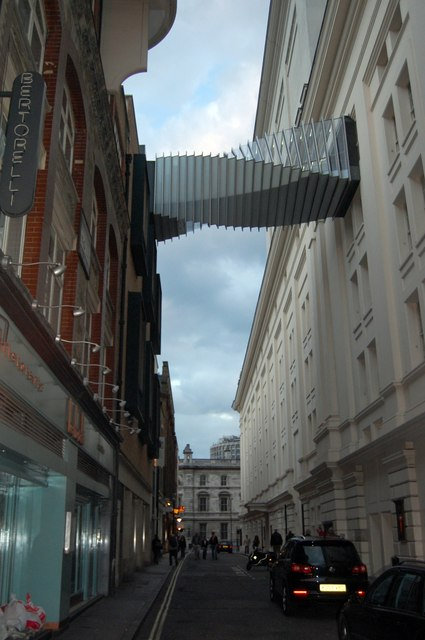
The Bridge of Aspiration connects the Royal Ballet School (left) to the Royal Opera House (right) on the 4th floor. The bridge was designed by Wilkinson Eyre Architects

The new building has the same traditional horseshoe-shaped auditorium as before, but with greatly improved technical, rehearsal, office, and educational facilities. Additionally, a new studio theatre, the Linbury, as well as more public space was created. The inclusion of the adjacent old Floral Hall, which had fallen into disrepair and was used as a scenery store before redevelopment, created a new and extensive public gathering place. The venue is now claimed by the ROH to be the most modern theatre facility in Europe.

Surtitles, projected onto a screen above the proscenium, have been used for all opera performances since they were introduced for school matinees in the 1983/4 season. Since the reopening of the theatre in 1999 an electronic libretto system provides translations onto small video screens for some seats, and additional monitors and screens are to be introduced to other parts of the house.

In 2014 design work, known as the Open Up Project, began with the aim of opening the theatre's building to the public during the day, as well as improving the entrances, lobby areas and the Linbury Theatre. As part of the Open Up Project, IQ Projects were tasked with the renovation of the upper floor bar area and restaurant utilising various elements of bespoke glazing.

In October 2020, the BBC reported that the Royal Opera House had lost 60% of its income as a result of restrictions implemented in response to the COVID-19 pandemic. As a consequence, the 1971 Portrait of Sir David Webster by David Hockney, which had hung in the opera house for several decades, was put up for auction at Christie's. It eventually sold for £12.8 million. The funds raised from the sale were needed to ensure the survival of the institution. "Significant redundancies" and an appeal for public donations were also made. In addition, the opera house applied for a loan to the Culture Recovery Fund.

In 2023 members of the orchestra were selected to play at the coronation of Charles III and Camilla.

In 2024, the public branding of the venue and its associated online and media presence was changed from the Royal Opera House to Royal Ballet and Opera to reflect the combined companies that call the physical building their home. The physical building itself remains the Royal Opera House whilst the branding and business operations change their title to reflect this adjustment.

=== 2025 ===
In March 2025, the ROH received multiple nominations for the upcoming Olivier Awards. Notably, Festen was nominated for Best New Opera Production.

== Facilities ==
=== Paul Hamlyn Hall ===
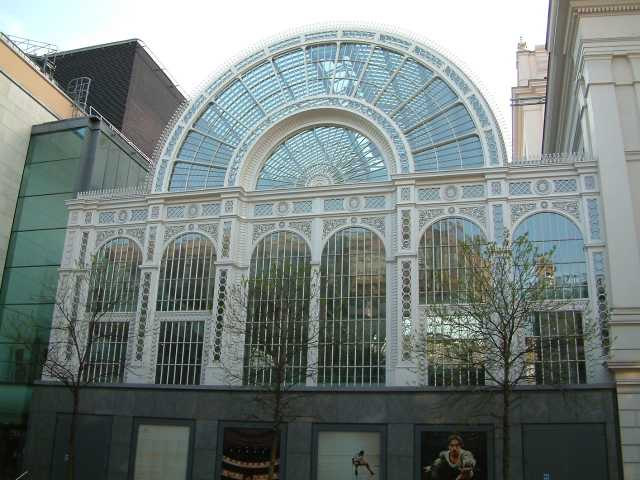
Exterior of the Paul Hamlyn Hall

The Paul Hamlyn Hall is a large iron and glass structure adjacent to, and with direct access to, the main opera house building. The hall now acts as the atrium and main public area of the opera house, with a champagne bar, restaurant and other hospitality services, and also providing access to the main auditorium at all levels.

The building was formerly known as Floral Hall. It was originally built by the Opera House to house a flower market (also selling fruits and vegetables), hence the name. It was designed by Edward Middleton Barry and opened in 1860. After being used as a concert hall, it became part of the Covent Garden Market in 1887. A fire broke out in the building in 1956, after which it sat derelict. It was acquired by the Opera House in 1977 and used as storage space.

The redevelopment of the Floral Hall as part of the 1990s redevelopment project involved lifting up the cast iron structure to accommodate new public areas for the opera house underneath. The southern side of the hall now connected with another building, so the cast iron south portico was dismantled and rebuilt in Borough Market, where it is separately Grade II heritage listed.

The redevelopment had gone ahead on the strength of a pledge of £10M from the philanthropist Alberto Vilar and for a number of years, it was known as the Vilar Floral Hall; however Vilar failed to make good his pledge. As a result, the name was changed in September 2005 to the Paul Hamlyn Hall, after the opera house received a donation of £10M from the estate of Paul Hamlyn, towards its education and development programmes.

As well as acting as a main public area for performances in the main auditorium, the Paul Hamlyn Hall is also used for hosting a number of events, including private functions, dances, exhibitions, concerts, and workshops.

=== Linbury Studio Theatre ===
The Linbury Studio Theatre is a flexible, secondary performance space, constructed below ground level within the Royal Opera House. It has retractable raked seating and a floor which can be raised or lowered to form a studio floor, a raised stage, or a stage with orchestra pit. The theatre can accommodate up to 400 patrons and host a variety of different events. It has been used for private functions, traditional theatre shows, and concerts, as well as community and educational events, product launches, dinners and exhibitions, etc., and is one of the most technologically advanced performance venues in London with its own public areas, including a bar and cloakroom.

The Linbury is most notable for hosting performances of experimental and independent dance and music, by independent companies and as part of the ROH2, the contemporary producing arm of the Royal Opera House. The Linbury Studio Theatre regularly stages performances by the Royal Ballet School and also hosts the Young British Dancer of the Year competition.

The venue was constructed as part of the 1990s redevelopment of the Royal Opera House. It is named in recognition of donations made by the Linbury Trust towards the redevelopment. The Trust is operated by Lord Sainsbury of Preston Candover and his wife Anya Linden, a former dancer with the Royal Ballet. The name Linbury is derived from the names Linden and Sainsbury. It was opened in 1999 with a collaboration from three Croydon secondary schools (including Coloma Convent Girls' School and Edenham High School) in an original performance called About Face.

=== Royal Opera House, Manchester ===
In 2008 the Royal Opera House and Manchester City Council began planning stages a new development known as Royal Opera House, Manchester. The proposal would have seen the Palace Theatre in Manchester refurbished, to create a theatre capable of staging productions by both the Royal Ballet and the Royal Opera. It was intended that the Royal Opera House would take residence of the theatre for an annual 18-week season, staging 16 performances by the Royal Opera, 28 performances by the Royal Ballet and other small-scale productions. A year later The Lowry sent an open letter to the then Secretary of State for Culture, Olympics, Media and Sport, Ben Bradshaw, Arts Council England, Manchester City Council and the ROH, calling for the scheme, in its current form, to be scrapped. In 2010 it was announced that the project was being shelved as part of larger arts-funding cuts.

=== High House Production Park (High House, Purfleet) ===
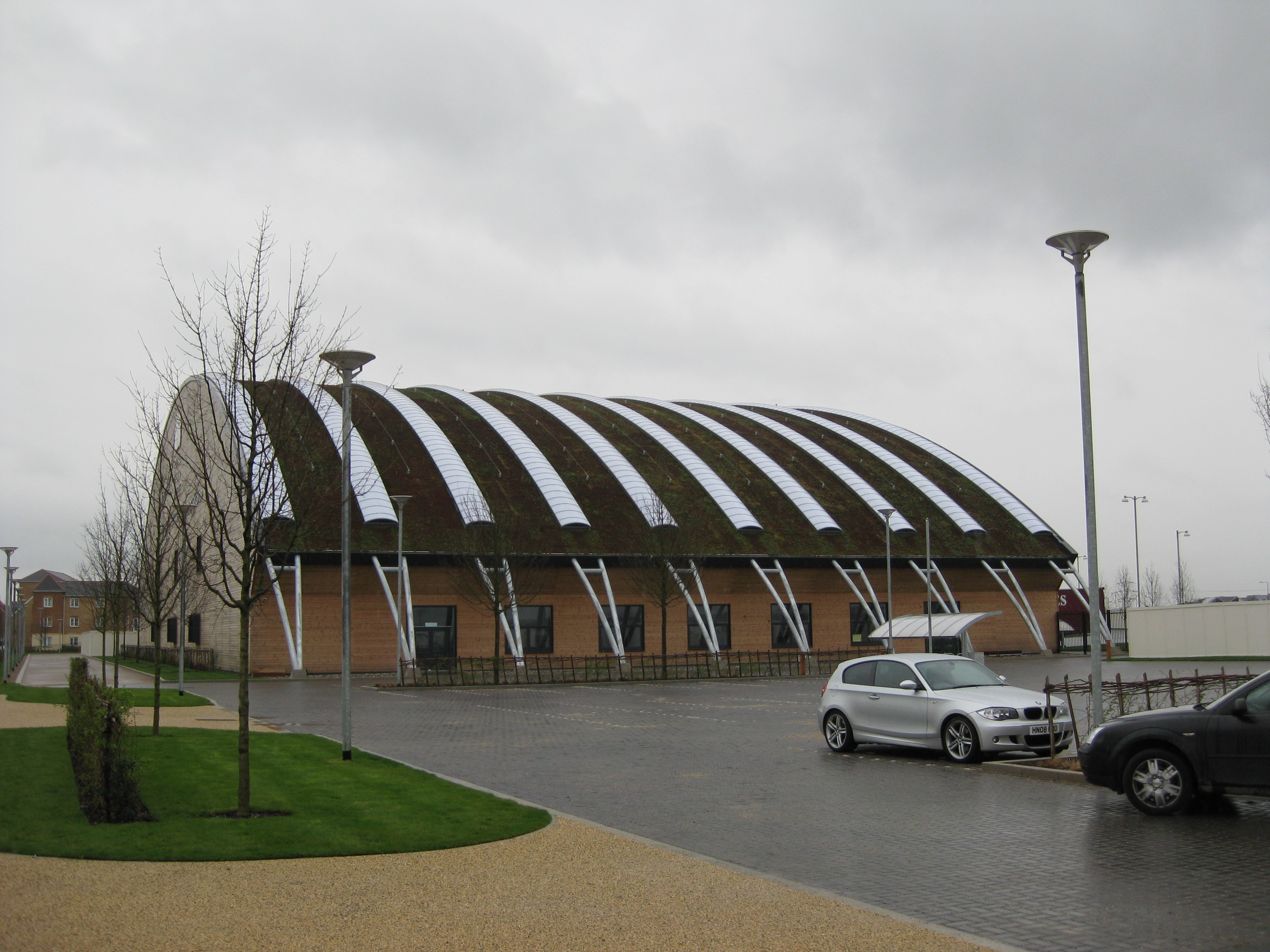
ROH's Manoukian Production Facility at High House, Purfleet

The Royal Opera House opened a scenery-making facility for their operas and ballets at High House, Purfleet, Essex, on 6 December 2010. The building was designed by Nicholas Hare Architects. The East of England Development Agency, which partly funded developments on the park, notes that "the first phase includes the Royal Opera House's Bob and Tamar Manoukian Production Workshop and Community areas".

The Bob and Tamar Manoukian Costume Centre, also designed by Nicholas Hare Associates, opened in September 2015, and provides a costume-making facility for the Royal Opera House and a training centre for students of costume-making from South Essex College. The building also houses the Royal Opera House's collection of historically important costumes.

Other elements at High House, Purfleet, include The Backstage Centre, a new technical theatre and music training centre which is currently run by the National College for Creative Industries and was formally opened by Creative & Cultural Skills in March 2013, alongside renovated farm buildings. Acme studios opened a complex of 43 artist studios in Summer 2013.

== Other uses ==
In addition to opera and ballet performances, the Royal Opera House has hosted a number of other events including:

- British Academy Film Awards – 2008 to 2016
- Laurence Olivier Awards – 2012 to 2016

== See also ==
- Owners, lessees and managers of the Royal Opera House, Covent Garden
- European Route of Historic Theatres
