= Portrait of Sir David Webster =

Painting by David Hockney

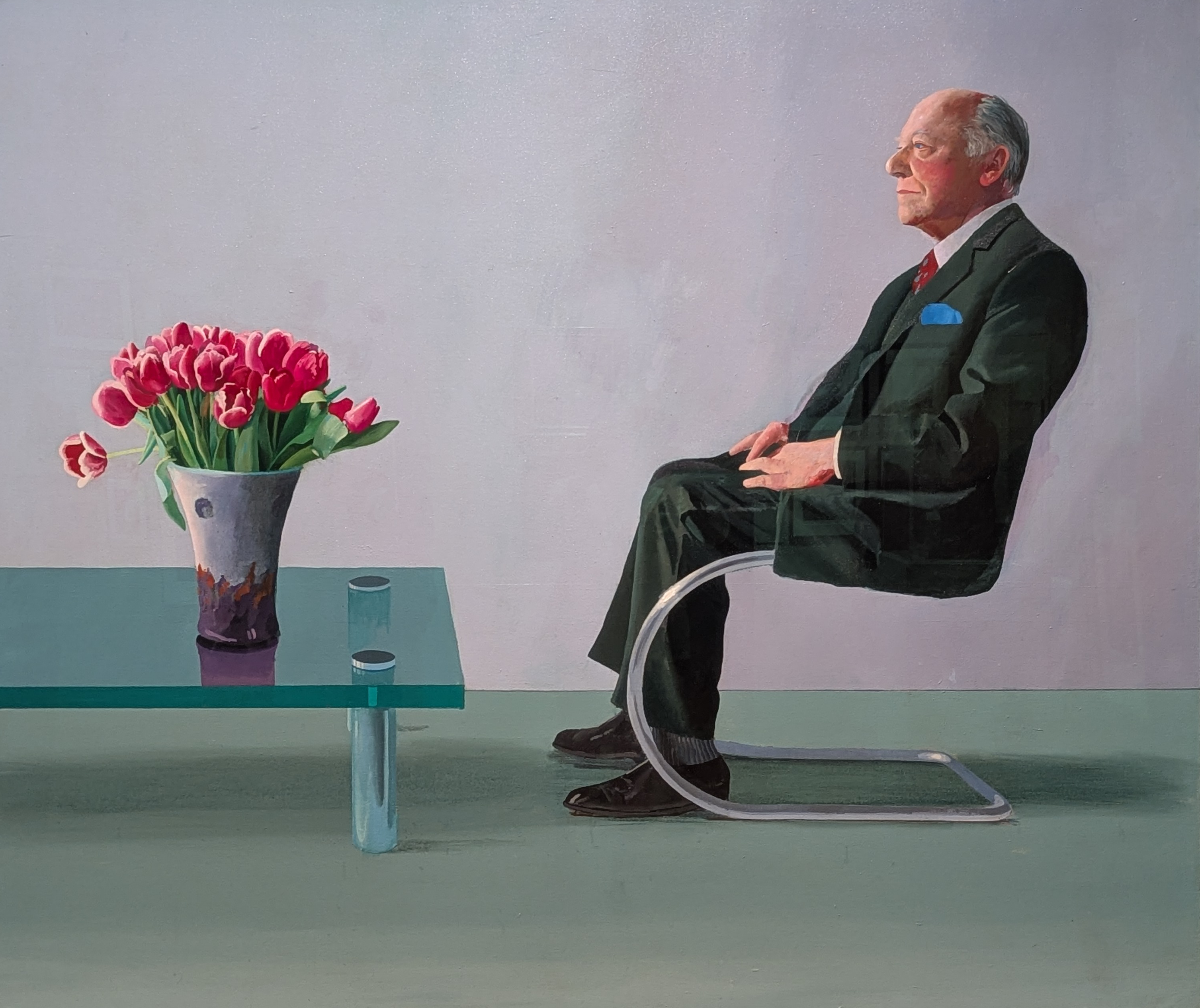
- Artist: David Hockney
- Year: 1971
- Medium: Acrylic on canvas
- Subject: David Webster
- Dimensions: 152.8 cm × 184.5 cm (60.2 in × 72.6 in)
- Location: Private collection

The Portrait of Sir David Webster is a 1971 portrait by the English artist David Hockney of the arts administrator David Webster. It was commissioned to mark Webster's retirement as the General Administrator of the Royal Opera House in London. The portrait hung for several decades in the opera house and is now displayed in the National Portrait Gallery on long-term loan.

== Description ==
The painting depicts a side profile of Webster in Hockney's studio sitting on a Ludwig Mies van der Rohe 'MR' chair by a glass-topped coffee table on which stands a vase of pink tulips, a favourite flower of Hockney's. The painting is signed and inscribed 'Sir David Webster with tulips Jan 1971 David Hockney'. It is executed in acrylic paint on canvas. It measures 60 1/8 in × 72 5/8 in (1,530 mm × 1,840 mm).

== Background ==
Hockney had originally planned to depict Webster in his house in Harley Street in the Marylebone district of London. Hockney found the commission difficult as he and Webster had not been previously acquainted saying that "I went to visit Webster many times . . . but it took me a long time to find a subject . . . And in the end I thought, all I can do is paint him in my studio". Hockney also felt pressurised by the timeframe of the commission with the painting needing to be ready before Webster's retirement. Webster was presented with the portrait by the singer Geraint Evans on behalf of the singers and staff of the opera house in February 1971. It was usually displayed in the Amphitheatre Bar on the top floor of the opera house. Webster died a few months after the completion of the painting, and it has been perceived as a memorial to him. Webster was seriously ill during the execution of the piece and Hockney worked up to 18 hours a day to complete the painting.

The portrait was the first commissioned portrait that Hockney had undertaken, having previously only painted portraits of acquaintances. It was his last commission until his portrait of Glyndebourne Festival Opera manager George Christie and his wife, Mary, in 2002 for the National Portrait Gallery in London. Three studies for the Portrait of Sir David Webster are in the British Arts Council Collection.

== Criticism ==
Hockney's 1971 painting Still Life on a Glass Table has been seen as complementing Webster's portrait in its composition. Webster's pose was echoed in Hockney's depiction of his father in his 1976 portrait My Parents and Myself. The glass table and tulips also featured in Hockney's 1968 painting Henry Geldzahler and Christopher Scott. Webster's portrait was completed by Hockney at the same time as his 1971 painting Mr and Mrs Clark and Percy. The painting demonstrates Hockney's technical mastery of acrylic paint; in their essay accompanying its 2020 sale Christie's praises the artists "layers of tonal gradation that contribute to the work's rich chiaroscuro effects" with the folds in Webster's suit being "a triumph of textural manipulation, while fine strokes of colour pick out the strands of his hair and the metallic glow of the chair leg. Each of the flower heads is individually tinted, like faces in a crowd". In a 1975 article Architectural Digest described Webster as "coldly indifferent to the empty background" in the painting and critiqued the "lonesome tulips" and described the lighting of the scene as "flat", "icily arrogant" and "dry".

== 2020 sale ==
It was put up by the Royal Opera House for auction at Christie's in 2020 due to a decline in their income as a result of the COVID-19 pandemic in the United Kingdom. It sold for £12.8 million against a presale estimate of £11–18 million. It is currently in the National Portrait Gallery on long-term loan from a private collection.
