= High House, Purfleet =

Buildings in Thurrock, Essex, England

Coordinates: 51.4793°N 0.2548°E

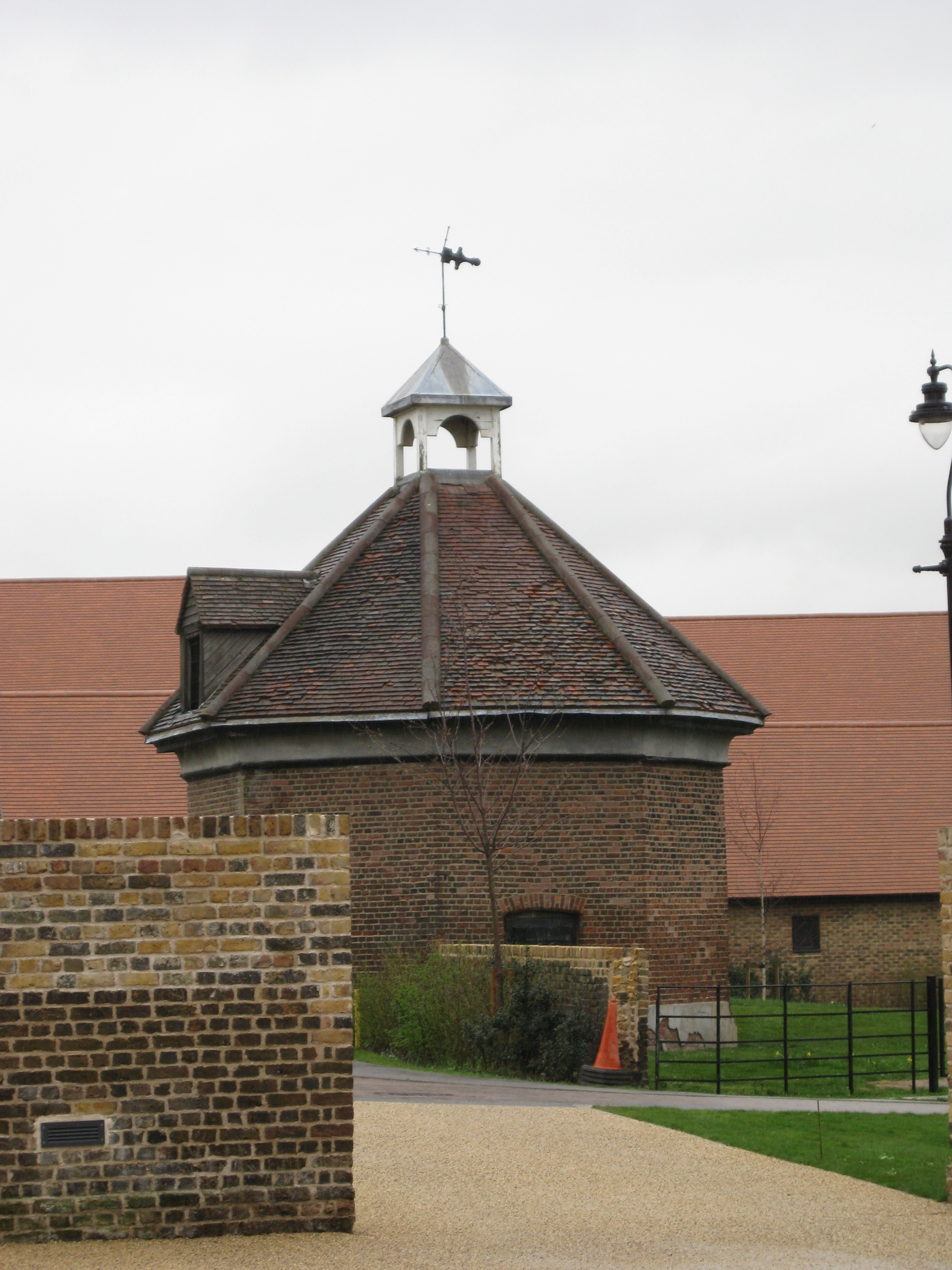
The Dovecote at High House

High House is the collective name for a group of historic buildings in Purfleet, Thurrock, Essex, which was used as a farm for hundreds of years, with a Grade II listed house and barn, but with the addition of one of the best dovecotes (dove houses) in Southern England, which is a Scheduled Ancient Monument and notable for its nest box array. This property includes the house, coachman's cottage, chaise house, stable, granary, barn, workshop, cart sheds, dovecote, and inner and outer walled gardens. Known by many names in its past, the farm has been called Le Vineyards, because grape vines were grown on one of its south facing slopes. Its current name comes from the fact that it is a house high on the hill, which commands great views over the River Thames.

== History ==
High House was originally built between 1552 and 1559 by Cecily Long to divide the Manor of West Thurrock, in Essex, equally between her two daughters. First built in timber and later replaced in brick in 1684, evidence remains of the Elizabethan timbers that are part of this early house in the fabric of the surviving 17th-century building. In fact, parts of the original panelling from the Queen Anne house were re-used in the later construction.

The house was a high-status farm, as an inventory of 1615 describes a gallery with armoury and a dining room with paintings, and the garden having a sun dial, garden benches and a statue. Architectural detail seen in the stable indicates the degree of quality, wealth and status that the occupants of the house commanded.

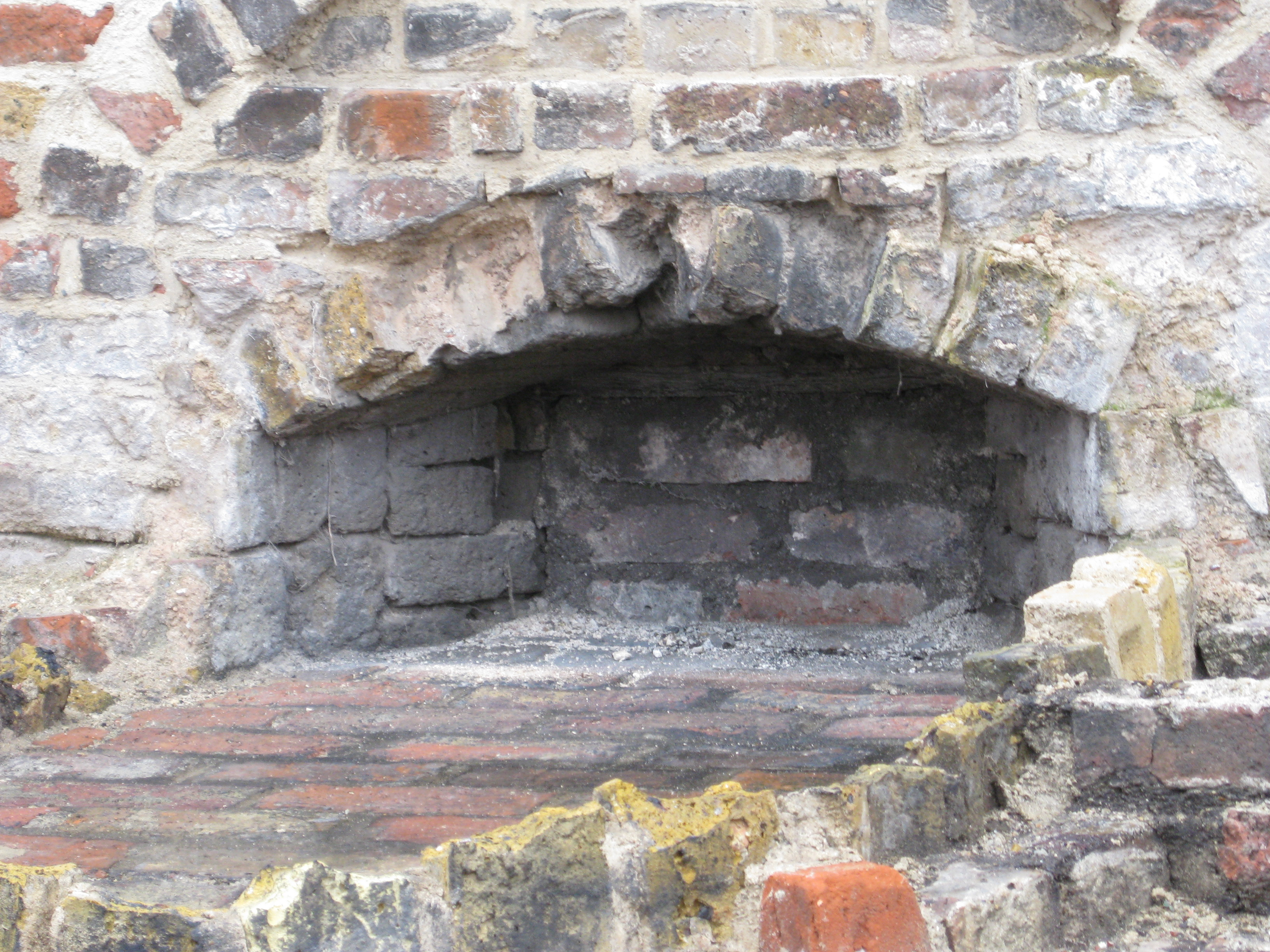
Original bread oven

The dovecote, a hexagonal building used to house doves, was a sign of wealth and prosperity. It would have been used to supplement the house kitchens with dove eggs and dove meat. In near-complete condition, this building still retains the internal wooden ladder used to reach all 517 nest boxes.

During the 16th and 17th centuries, the house had cherry orchards, and grew other crops, pumpkins being the last crops to be harvested at the house in the 1950s in front of the dovecote. Caleb Grantham, who owned the chalk pits and lime works and also worked for the East India Company, left his life at sea to become director of London Assurance from 1744 to 1756 and whilst in Thurrock lived at High House.

"In 1876 West Thurrock consisted of a 'few cottages some wooden, all poor' and 'several well-to-do farms'. Of those buildings High House, west of Stonehouse Lane, also known as West Hall, or Le Vyneyard alone survives."

Development in West Thurrock, originally from the chalk industry and later from a wide variety of industries, gradually decreased the size of the land owned and farmed by High House, but it was the Purfleet bypass which signalled the end for High House as a viable farm in the traditional sense. After the bypass's construction, the farm was first converted into a private school, and later flats, until it closed and lay empty for many years.

== The Royal Opera House at High House Production Park ==
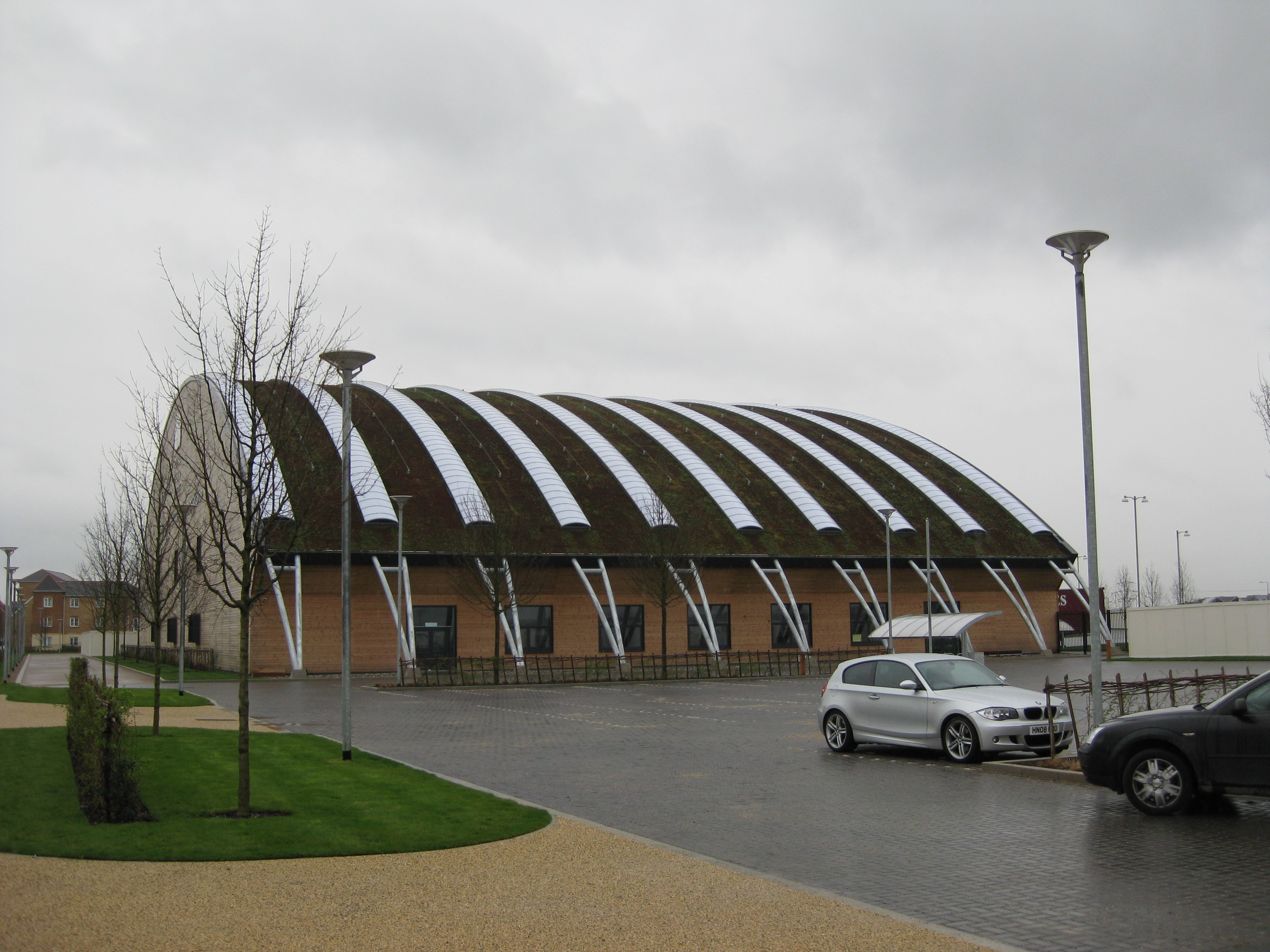
The Royal Opera House's Bob and Tamar Production Workshop at High House Production Park

The Royal Opera House opened the Bob and Tamar Manoukian Production Workshop, a scene-making facility for its opera and ballet productions on the High House site in December 2010. The facility was designed by Nicholas Hare Architects and has won several design awards. The specially designed production workshop has a paint-spray room, welding bays, and large scenery-painting workshops. All the productions for the Royal Opera, the Royal Ballet and Birmingham Royal Ballet are now made at High House Production Park.

The Royal Opera House Education Department has a team of staff at the Park who run community outreach and education projects focusing on the backstage and technical crafts. Before the Production Facility opened, the Education team premiered a community opera in the space in December 2010. Called 'Ludd and Isis' the opera was based on themes from local history and included professional artists and local participants.

The Bob and Tamar Manoukian Costume Centre, also designed by Nicholas Hare Architects, opened in September 2015 and provides a costume-making facility for the Royal Opera House and a training centre for students of costume-making from South Essex College. The building also houses the Royal Opera House collection of historically important costumes.

== The Backstage Centre ==
Creative & Cultural Skills opened The Backstage Centre in October 2012, launching the building formally in March 2013 with a "ribbon cutting" event with musician Jools Holland. The building was designed in consultation with theatre and music industry experts and provides a versatile training, rehearsal and technical space. The sound stage has a floor area of 875 m^{2} with a height of 15 m. Other spaces include technical training rooms, green room, a dance studio, music studio with adjacent band room and office accommodation.

The Backstage Centre was designed to provide teaching for students in practical skills to enable them to work in theatre, stage, events and music productions and to support Creative & Cultural Skills' National Skills Academy for Creative & Cultural programme of work with students from across the UK. Students from South Essex College took up residence at the centre on opening. A new venture to create National College Creative Industries Ltd (NCCI) culminated in a partnership with South Essex College and Access to Music in 2020.

The building was constructed by Kier Eastern who were appointed to build the facility in March 2011. The building was designed by Gibberd. The space is available for hire for industry use and has hosted TV production companies, events, training activity, conferences, live music acts and theatre.

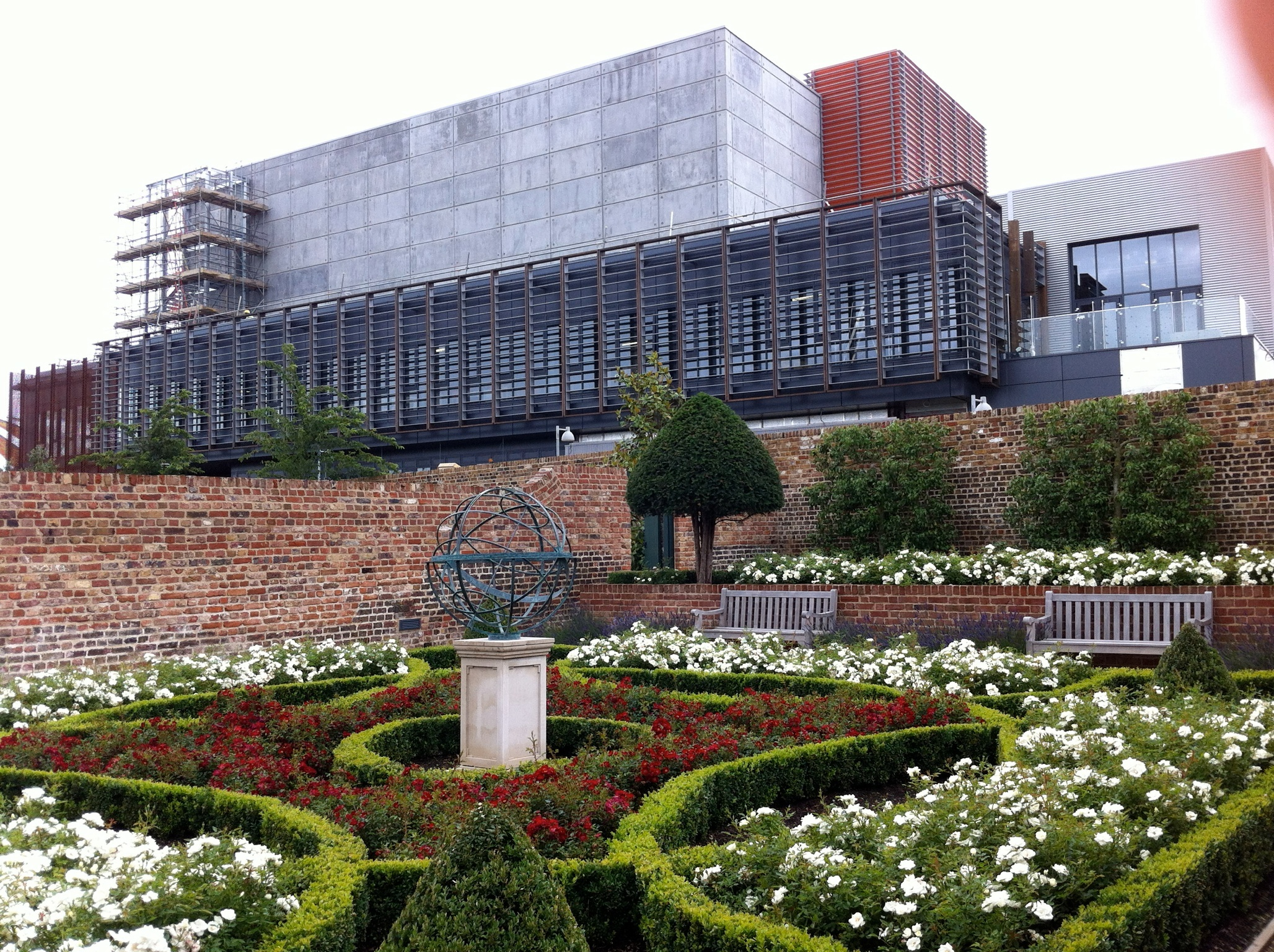
View of The Backstage Centre from the walled garden, October 2012

In 2013 The Backstage Centre was Highly Commended in the British Construction Industry Awards. In 2014 The Centre won the Best Regeneration Project and was Highly Commended in the Community Benefit category in the East of England RICS (Royal Institute of Chartered Surveyors) awards.

== Archaeology ==
Early Romano-British burials were found on the site of High House Production Park. These remains were carefully excavated and preserved, with a large amount of evidence being found throughout the site indicating Romano-British, Bronze Age and Iron Age ditches with corresponding finds. Archaeologists also found evidence of pre-historic pits and post holes, indicating that a prehistoric settlement of an unknown size was on the site.

== High House Production Park ==
High House Production Park (HHPP) is both the name of the park and of the charitable body which is responsible for running the 14-acre park following the regeneration work originally led by Thurrock Thames Gateway Development Corporation (TTGDC). It was originally chaired by Tony Hall, Baron Hall of Birkenhead and is currently chaired by Alex Beard CBE, CEO of the Royal Opera House. The site includes a collection of renovated Grade II listed farm buildings that house staff who run the Thurrock Music Hub, a renovated barn for community use and a cafe.

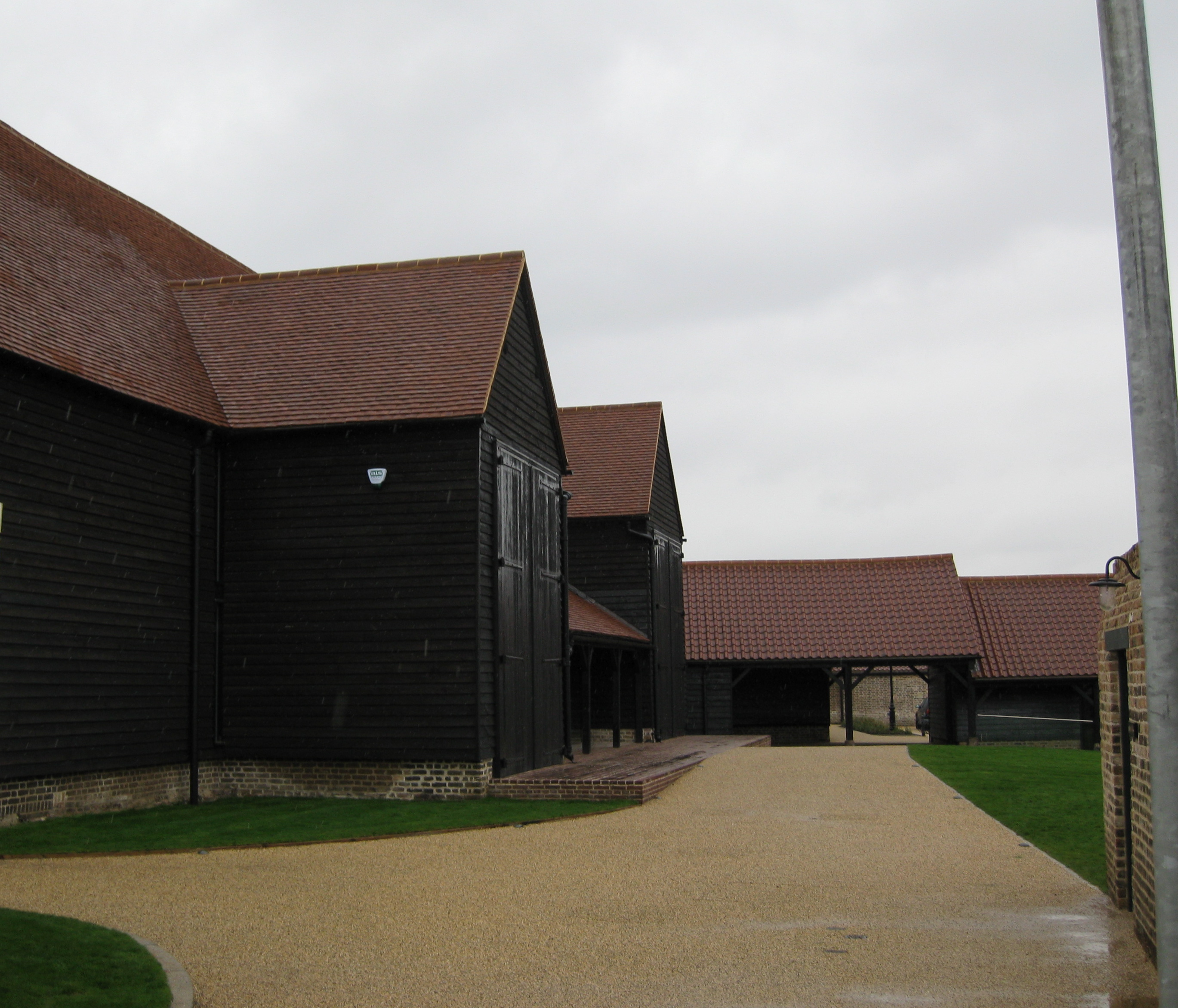
The renovated barn, March 2011

Community and artistic projects have been organised at the Park since 2009. In early 2012 artworks by five contemporary artists were exhibited within the park and gardens. The park regularly hosts events such as live screenings from the Royal Opera House, The Big Draw with the Campaign for Drawing and community activities such as pop-up festivals. The barns are a venue for local weddings.

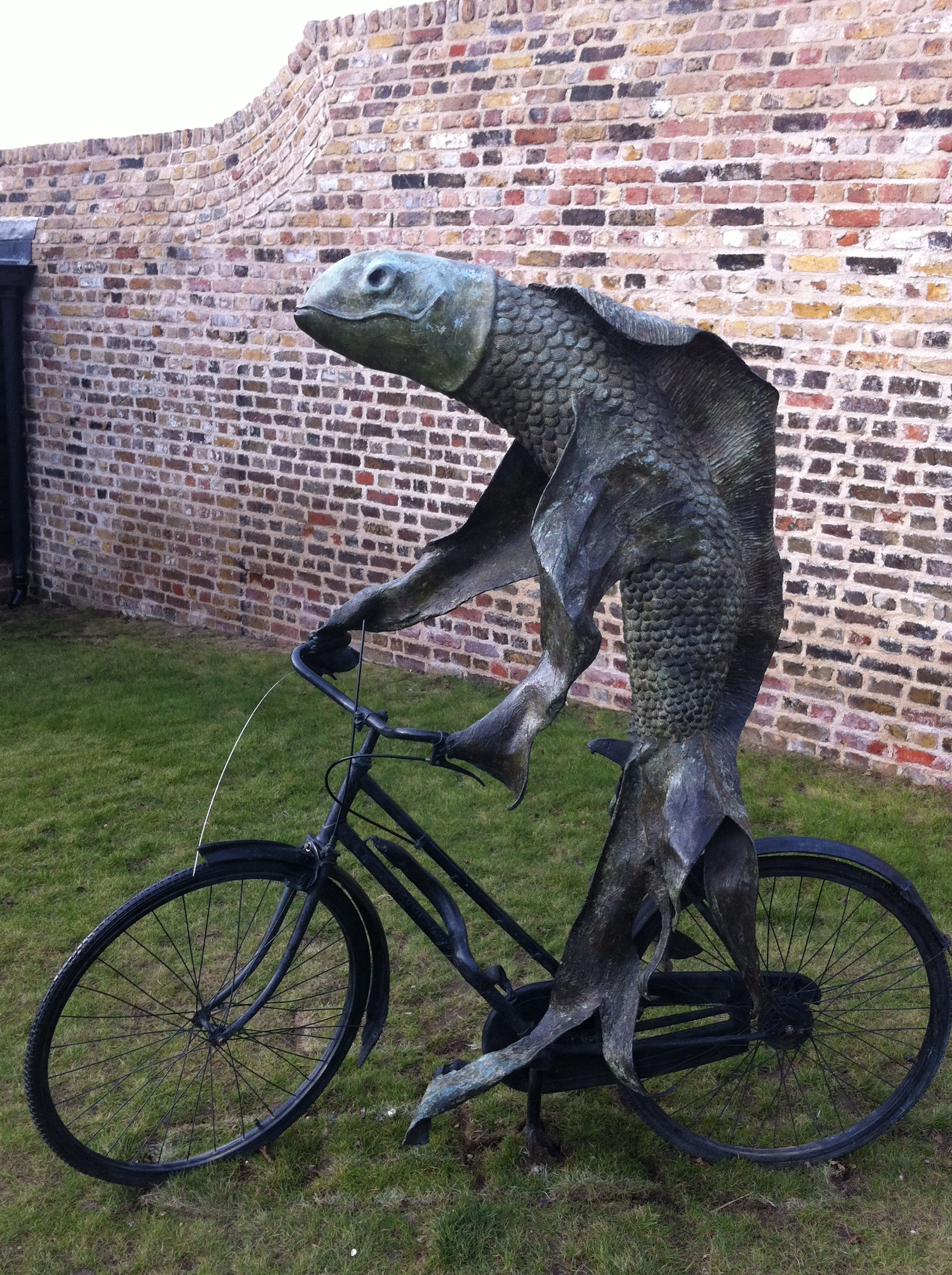
Fish on a Bike by Steven Gregory at High House Production Park, February 2012

== Acme Studios ==
Acme Studios is a London-based charity, formed by artists in 1972, which supports the development of fine art practice by providing artists with affordable studio and living space. A new development at High House Production Park began construction in 2012. The purpose-designed three-storey studio building was designed by HAT Projects and comprises 39 studios and 4 work/live units and opened in July 2013.
