= Creative & Cultural Skills =

UK Government Council

Creative & Cultural Skills is one of the Sector Skills Councils established by the UK Government in 2005 to foster the development of a skilled workforce.

== Function ==
It covers crafts, cultural heritage, jewelry, design, music, performing, literary and visual arts. It was created to bridge the gap between industry, education and the government, as well as to give employers an effective influence over education and the skills developed in the U.K.

== Structure ==
Its founder was Tony Hall, Baron Hall of Birkenhead (2004–2009), and the founder Chief Executive was Tom Bewick (2004–2010) who, as a special adviser to the Labour Government, designed the policy for establishing SSCs across the UK industrial economy. The current chair is Donald Hyslop.

Creative & Cultural Skills' registered office is The Backstage Centre, High House Purfleet, Essex which it built and opened in 2013. Its staff are based across England, Wales and Northern Ireland.

== National Skills Academy for Creative & Cultural ==
Established in April 2009, the National Skills Academy for Creative & Cultural is a network of more than 500 employers from the creative industries and over 40 Further Education Colleges across nine English regions, Scotland, Northern Ireland, and Wales.

Throughout the year, the Academy runs various events, including Careers events and an annual industry conference. In Autumn 2010, for example, the Academy delivered 25 career events across the nation which featured practical and informative day programmes focusing on backstage, technical, and administrative roles in the industry. Additionally, NSA Founder Colleges and Industry Members collaborate to provide teenagers with the opportunity to get a taste of what goes on behind the scenes of the world’s biggest events, as well as giving them the chance to tackle professionally set challenges as part of their course work.

Creative & Cultural Skills also maintains Creative Choices, a website specifically for young people which provides information and advice about creative careers. Features include 'Ask an Expert', where users can ask questions to people already working in the industry.

Since 2013, Creative & Cultural Skills has been running the Creative Employment Programme, which is funded with a £15 million grant from Arts Lottery through Arts Council England. This programme incentivises creative sector employers to take on apprentices and paid interns.

== The Backstage Centre ==
The Skills Academy has developed a technical theatre, events and music training centre called The Backstage Centre in Purfleet, Essex as part of High House Production Park at High House Purfleet. The building houses training that could not otherwise be delivered nationally due to space and time restrictions in existing technical theatre training and performance spaces, and exposes learners to top level, world class technical theatre and live music professionals, companies and bands in a unique training environment. The design incorporates a large main space of 875 m^{2} with a 17m ceiling and a number of other training spaces including a CAD studio, lighting and audio-visual training studios, generic training spaces, a recording studio and band rehearsal room. These spaces offer access to a wide variety of technical performance media and support the transferability of skills and knowledge. The building has been open for business since May 2012.
