= Sarre Anglo-Saxon cemetery =

Archaeological site in Kent, England

Coordinates: 51.3396°N 1.2470°E

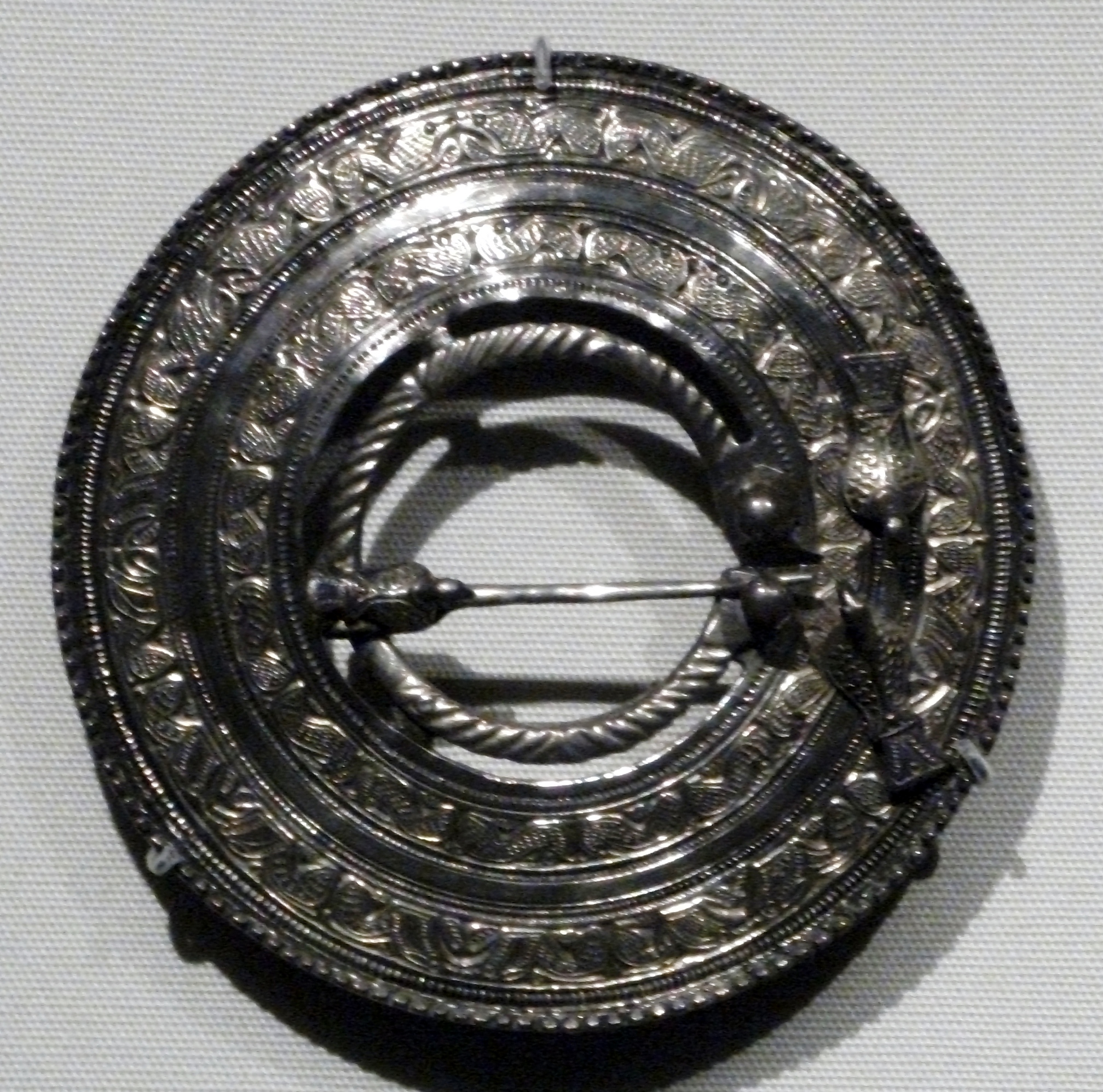
The Sarre Brooch in the British Museum, the classic example of the Anglo-Saxon Quoit Brooch Style

Sarre Anglo-Saxon cemetery is a place of burial that was used in the sixth and seventh centuries CE.

== Background ==
The Kingdom of Kent.

With the advent of the Anglo-Saxon period in the fifth century CE, the area that became Kent underwent a radical transformation on a political, social, and physical level. In the preceding era of Roman Britain, the area had been administered as the civitas of Cantiaci, a part of the Roman Empire, but following the collapse of Roman rule in 410 CE, many signs of Romano-British society began to disappear, replaced by those of the ascendant Anglo-Saxon culture. Later Anglo-Saxon accounts attribute this change to the widescale invasion of Germanic language tribes from northern Europe, namely the Angles, Saxons, and Jutes. Archaeological and toponymic evidence shows that there was a great deal of syncretism, with Anglo-Saxon culture interacting and mixing with the Romano-British culture.

The Old English term Kent first appears in the Anglo-Saxon period, and was based on the earlier Celtic-language name Cantii. Initially applied only to the area east of the River Medway, by the end of the sixth century it also referred to areas to the west of it. The Kingdom of Kent was the first recorded Anglo-Saxon kingdom to appear in the historical record, and by the end of sixth century, it had become a significant political power, exercising hegemony over large parts of southern and eastern Britain. At the time, Kent had strong trade links with Francia, while the Kentish royal family married members of Francia's Merovingian dynasty, who were already Christian. Kentish King Æthelberht was the overlord of various neighbouring kingdoms when he converted to Christianity in the early seventh century as a result of Augustine of Canterbury and the Gregorian mission, who had been sent by Pope Gregory to replace England's pagan beliefs with Christianity. It was in this context that the Polhill cemetery was in use.

Kent has a wealth of Early Medieval funerary archaeology. The earliest excavation of Anglo-Saxon Kentish graves was in the 17th century, when antiquarians took an increasing interest in the material remains of the period. In the ensuing centuries, antiquarian interest gave way to more methodical archaeological investigation, and prominent archaeologists like Bryan Faussett, James Douglas, Cecil Brent, George Payne, and Charles Roach Smith "dominated" archaeological research in Kent.

== Archaeological investigation ==
The existence of Sarre was not noted by any of the early antiquarians who studied the Anglo-Saxon cemeteries of Kent. Sarre cemetery was discovered in 1843, and re-examined in 1860, when a number of artefacts were discovered during construction work at Sarre windmill, subsequently being purchased by the British Museum. It was excavated in 1863 by the Kent Archaeological Society, in a project directed by John Brent, who published his findings in the Archaeologia Cantiana journal. Aided by two workmen, he used a metal probe to determine the locations of the graves.

After this excavation, which was believed to have been total, the cemetery was relegated to "the history of archaeology", being considered “arguably the richest Anglo-Saxon burial ground yet discovered”. It was not scheduled as an Ancient Monument at the time, but in 1999 it was designated a scheduled monument along with the nearby remains of an 11th-century church.

In 1982, an excavation of the supposed site of St. Giles took place under the directorship of D.R.J. Perkins, revealing Anglo-Saxon graves around 50 metres away from Brent's excavated area. This led Perkins to review the original cemetery plan, and undertake aerial photography of the site; this suggested that there were various features that Brent had not revealed, and that the cemetery was larger than previously believed. It was decided that further excavation of the site was necessary, with the cooperation of the landowners, Church Commissioners, as well as the local farmer, Michael Baxter.

In May 1991, Southern Water commenced a sewage construction near the site, and funded a rescue excavation of the area from the Trust for Thanet Archaeology.

== See also ==
- List of Anglo-Saxon cemeteries
- Buckland Anglo-Saxon cemetery
- Finglesham Anglo-Saxon cemetery
- Mill Hill Anglo-Saxon cemetery
