= Mill Hill Anglo-Saxon cemetery =

Cemetery in England

Mill Hill Anglo-Saxon Cemetery
- Location within Kent
- Established: 6th century CE
- Location: Deal, Kent
- Coordinates: 51.207307°N 1.381475°E
- Type: Anglo-Saxon inhumation cemetery

Mill Hill Anglo-Saxon cemetery is a place of burial located close to the town of Deal in Kent, South-East England. Belonging to the Middle Anglo-Saxon period, it was part of the much wider tradition of burial in Early Anglo-Saxon England.

Mill Hill was an inhumation-only cemetery, with no evidence of cremation.

== Location ==
Mill Hill is close to the foot of the North Downs dip-slope, forming a 2 kilometre ridge of Upper Chalk. The cemetery lies on the south-east end of this ridge, adjacent to two disused chalk quarries opposite Deal Waterworks. The site on which it was located is now under two housing developments, Walmer Way and Fairview Gardens, on the south west side of St. Richard's Row on Mill Hill, Deal.

== Background ==
The Kingdom of Kent

With the advent of the Anglo-Saxon period in the fifth century CE, the area that became Kent underwent a radical transformation on a political, social, and physical level. In the preceding era of Roman Britain, the area had been administered as the civitas of Cantiaci, a part of the Roman Empire, but following the collapse of Roman rule in 410 CE, many signs of Romano-British society began to disappear, replaced by those of the ascendant Anglo-Saxon culture. Later Anglo-Saxon accounts attribute this change to the widescale invasion of Germanic language tribes from northern Europe, namely the Angles, Saxons, and Jutes. Archaeological and toponymic evidence shows that there was a great deal of syncretism, with Anglo-Saxon culture interacting and mixing with the Romano-British culture.

The Old English term Kent first appears in the Anglo-Saxon period, and was based on the earlier Celtic-language name Cantii. Initially applied only to the area east of the River Medway, by the end of the sixth century it also referred to areas to the west of it. The Kingdom of Kent was the first recorded Anglo-Saxon kingdom to appear in the historical record, and by the end of sixth century, it had become a significant political power, exercising hegemony over large parts of southern and eastern Britain. At the time, Kent had strong trade links with Francia, while the Kentish royal family married members of Francia's Merovingian dynasty, who were already Christian. Kentish King Æthelberht was the overlord of various neighbouring kingdoms when he converted to Christianity in the early seventh century as a result of Augustine of Canterbury and the Gregorian mission, who had been sent by Pope Gregory to replace England's pagan beliefs with Christianity. It was in this context that the Mill Hill cemetery was in use.

Kent has a wealth of Early Medieval funerary archaeology. The earliest excavation of Anglo-Saxon Kentish graves was in the 17th century, when antiquarians took an increasing interest in the material remains of the period. In the ensuing centuries, antiquarian interest gave way to more methodical archaeological investigation, and prominent archaeologists like Bryan Faussett, James Douglas, Cecil Brent, George Payne, and Charles Roach Smith "dominated" archaeological research in Kent.

== See also ==
- List of Anglo-Saxon cemeteries
- Buckland Anglo-Saxon cemetery
- Fordcroft Anglo-Saxon cemetery
- Finglesham Anglo-Saxon cemetery
- Polhill Anglo-Saxon cemetery
