= Polhill Anglo-Saxon cemetery =

Medieval burial ground in the United Kingdom

Polhill Anglo-Saxon Cemetery
- Location within Kent
- Established: 7th century CE
- Location: Polhill, Kent
- Coordinates: 51.309423°N 0.158448°E
- Type: Anglo-Saxon inhumation cemetery

Polhill Anglo-Saxon cemetery is a place of burial that was used in the seventh and eighth centuries AD. It is located close to the hamlet of Polhill, near Sevenoaks in Kent, South-East England. Belonging to the Middle Anglo-Saxon period, it was part of the much wider tradition of burial in Early Anglo-Saxon England.

Polhill was an inhumation-only cemetery, with no evidence of cremation. An estimated 180 to 200 graves were placed there, containing between 200 and 220 individuals. The cemetery was on a false crest on the hill, having wide views of the surrounding landscape, and was roughly 1 ha (2 1/2 acres) in size. Many of the dead were interred with grave goods, which included personal ornaments, weapons, and domestic items, and some had tumuli erected above their graves.

The central area of the cemetery was sporadically excavated from 1839 to 1964 during the course of road building. Specific archaeological excavation of the west area of the site took place in 1967 under the directorship of Brian Philp, and continued in 1978. In 1984, Philp led the excavation of the east end of the cemetery in response to the expansion of the M25 motorway.

== Location ==
The cemetery is located on the lower slopes of Polhill, in the parish of Dunton Green near to Sevenoaks, Kent. Geologically, it sits upon a hard upper chalk layer, at the junction between the Darent Valley and North Downs scarp. The cemetery occupies a false crest on a steep hillside, commanding a view across the valley that is almost 3 kilometres wide, and also looks up the valley to the north and along the scarp to the south-west. Director of excavations Brian Philp thought this choice of location was "highly significant", allowing the "ancestors" to be buried in a "very dominant" position in the landscape.

The focal point of the local area is the village of Otford, located about 2 kilometres east of the cemetery. From the centre of Otford, the cemetery is visible, and Philp suggested that it was the most likely location of the Anglo-Saxon village where the people who used Polhill cemetery lived.

== Background ==
The Kingdom of Kent.

With the advent of the Anglo-Saxon period in the fifth century AD, the area that became Kent underwent a radical transformation on a political, social, and physical level. In the preceding era of Roman Britain, the area had been administered as the civitas of Cantiaci, a part of the Roman Empire, but following the collapse of Roman rule in 410 AD, many signs of Romano-British society began to disappear, replaced by those of the ascendant Anglo-Saxon culture. Later Anglo-Saxon accounts attribute this change to the widescale invasion of Germanic language tribes from northern Europe, namely the Angles, Saxons, and Jutes. Archaeological and toponymic evidence shows that there was a great deal of syncretism, with Anglo-Saxon culture interacting and mixing with the Romano-British culture.

The Old English term Kent first appears in the Anglo-Saxon period, and was based on the earlier Celtic-language name Cantii. Initially applied only to the area east of the River Medway, by the end of the sixth century it also referred to areas to the west of it. The Kingdom of Kent was the first recorded Anglo-Saxon kingdom to appear in the historical record, and by the end of the sixth century, it had become a significant political power, exercising hegemony over large parts of southern and eastern Britain. At the time, Kent had strong trade links with Francia, while the Kentish royal family married members of Francia's Merovingian dynasty, who were already Christian. Kentish King Æthelberht was the overlord of various neighbouring kingdoms when he converted to Christianity in the early seventh century as a result of Augustine of Canterbury and the Gregorian mission, who had been sent by Pope Gregory to replace England's pagan beliefs with Christianity. It was in this context that the Polhill cemetery was in use.

Kent has a wealth of Early Medieval funerary archaeology. The earliest excavation of Anglo-Saxon Kentish graves was in the 17th century, when antiquarians took an increasing interest in the material remains of the period. In the ensuing centuries, antiquarian interest gave way to more methodical archaeological investigation, and prominent archaeologists like Bryan Faussett, James Douglas, Cecil Brent, George Payne, and Charles Roach Smith "dominated" archaeological research in Kent.

== Cemetery features ==
The 1984–86 excavation revealed that the cemetery had followed clearly delineated limits, and that while a large space of hillside had been available, all of the burials were located within the 112- to 118-metre contours. Only inhumations were found at the site, with no cremation burials. 73 graves had been excavated from the Western Area, 52 from the Eastern Area, 4 to the left of the main cemetery, and an estimated 53 from the Central Area: a total of 182 graves has been established for the cemetery. Taking into account potential further isolated graves outside the main area of the cemetery, Philp suggested that there might be between 180 and 220 graves at the site, containing between 200 and 220 individuals. Based on the idea that the cemetery was used for a century between 650 and 750 CE, Philp suggested that there would have been an average two burials at the cemetery per year. Taking this and the average life expectancy of 26 into account, he suggested that the cemetery served a local community of around 70 to 90 people, making it the largest known community in West Kent at this period. The majority of skeletal remains had survived well due to the well-drained chalk geology, although in a number of graves, particularly those of children, they have almost entirely eroded. Based on the 1984–86 excavation, archaeologists noted that 4 infants were buried alongside the 48 juveniles and adults. The site therefore does not reflect the high levels of infant mortality that local communities would have faced.

The main cemetery is approximately 210 metres in length from west to east, with a north–south width of 50 metres, although it appears to taper at both ends. Its interior totals around 10,500 square metres, about one hectare or 2½ acres. The graves were not evenly spaced in the cemetery, but often clustered together in what excavator Brian Philp suggested might have been family units. Most of these burials were on the southern side of the cemetery, and the site was more densely crowded in the west than the east. From the 1984–86 excavation, 50 of the graves contained a single skeleton, with the only exception being Grave 19, where two individuals had been buried together. In keeping with many Anglo-Saxon cemeteries, most of the inhumations were broadly aligned east to west. Philp considered it significant that 66% of the 51 burials excavated from 1984–86 were orientated between 70 and 109 degrees.

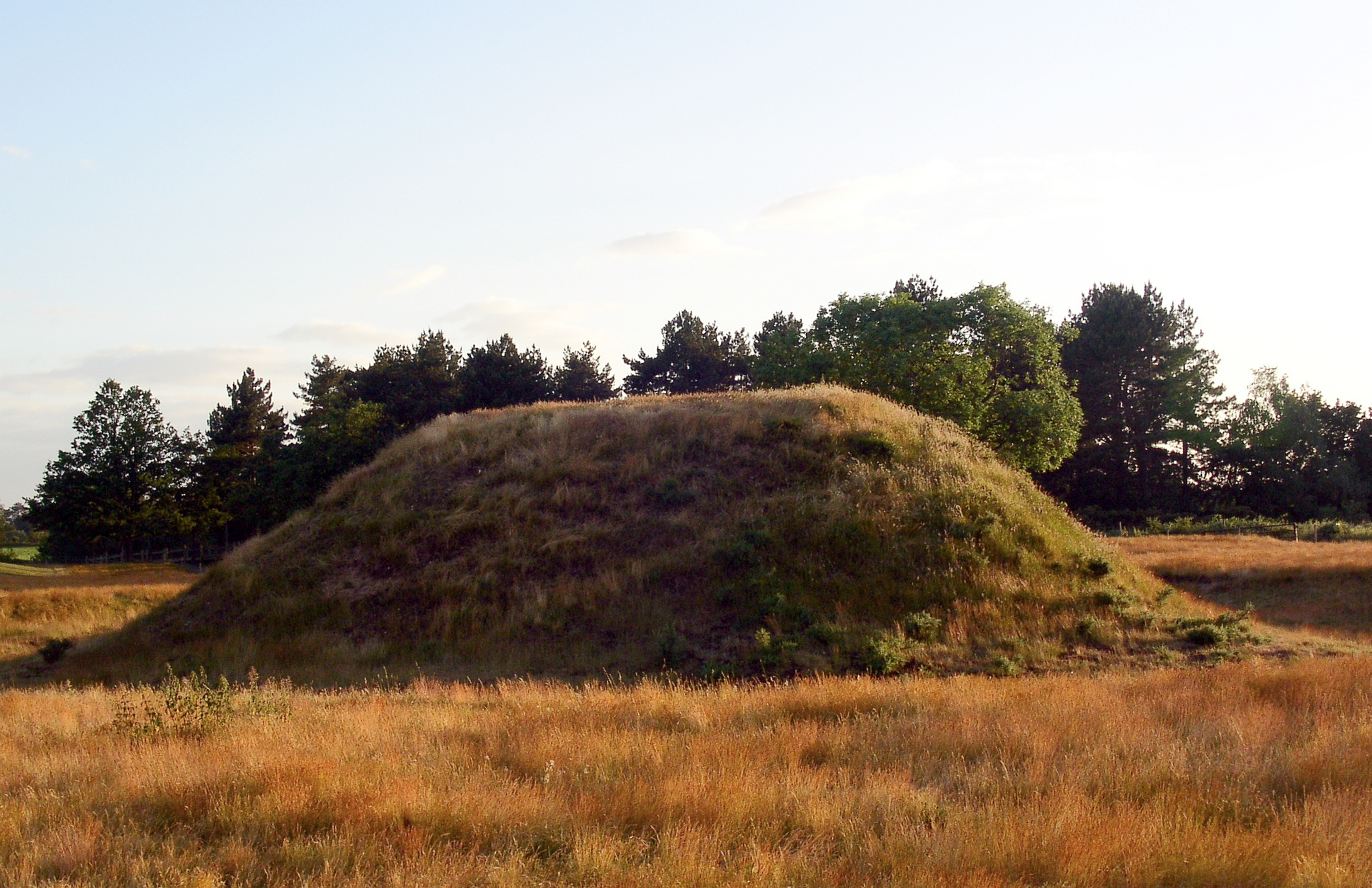
Small tumuli would have covered a number of the burials at Polhill. This is a larger example from Sutton Hoo in Suffolk.

Of the 51 inhumations excavated in the 1980s, 36 were found to contain grave goods, and 14 were not. One burial had been partially destroyed, meaning what excavators did not know if it had once been accompanied with grave goods. Around 140 artefacts were uncovered from this excavation, most of which were personal ornaments, weapons, or domestic items. Philp believed that those inhumations containing spearheads, seaxes, or a shield would have been high status burials at the time. Only one burial, designated Grave 1 in the 1984 excavation, contained a shield. Also containing a spear, it was located at the far east of the cemetery, leading Philp to suggest that it might have had particular significance.

8 of the 51 inhumations excavated between 1984–86 were enclosed in small penannular ditches, indicating that they had probably been covered by small tumuli. Evidence for a further six tumuli were uncovered in the 1967 excavation, meaning that there was at least 14 tumuli across the cemetery. It is possible that other burials at the site were also covered by barrows, but that these have been eroded by ploughing in later centuries, leaving no archaeological trace. The known barrow burials were spaced evenly throughout the cemetery, and were between 4 and 5½ metres in diameter. All but two of those recorded have eastern entrances through the penannular ditch. Most of these barrows covered single inhumations, although one tumulus covered both Graves 94 and 95, and another contained no inhumation at all. Of the individuals buried beneath the 14 identified tumuli, 5 have been identified as male, 5 as female, 1 as an unidentified adult and the other 3 as children.

== Archaeological investigation ==
Graves in the central section of the cemetery were sporadically discovered between 1839 and 1964, as a road was built and enlarged through the middle of it. The likely first discovery of skeletons at the site was in 1839, when the Sevenoaks Turnpike Road was diverted, which would have entailed digging at the site; no burials were recorded, although an oral tradition of skeletons and weapons being discovered survived through to the 1930s, when it was recorded by Gordon Ward. In June 1956 the A26 underwent roadworks, resulting in the discovery of 13 further graves. In 1956 and 1958, the Otford Historical Society began an excavation nearby, in the hope of discovering more of the cemetery, but they missed the burial area, discovering nothing. In August 1959, another road improvement revealed 3 further graves on the west side of the bank, while in November 1959 and January 1960, schoolboys digging into the chalk uncovered two more. A further grave was discovered around 1963 by workmen building a small reservoir; this burial was not recorded.

In October 1964, work began on constructing the Sevenoaks Bypass, which affected the site. On the west side of the road, a 40-foot wide strip of ground was removed, revealing one grave and potentially destroying others. The contractor reported the find to Kent County Council, who through Maidstone Museum contacted archaeologist Brian Philp, who initiated a six-day rescue excavation under the auspices of the new Kent Archaeological Research Groups' Council's emergency scheme. They excavated and recorded 14 graves, and recorded another 2 in a pipe-trench. In November 1966, further construction revealed more graves, this time on the east side of the A21. With further construction proposed, Philp and his team launched a large-scale rescue excavation of the western end of the cemetery through the West Kent Border Archaeological Group, assisted by other groups in the region and the Council for Kentish Archaeology. In total, they revealed 68 graves, and the small hut. KARU discovered four further graves in an isolated group to the west of the cemetery in 1978.

In 1982, it was discovered that an extension of the M25 motorway would cross to the east of the site. The Kent Archaeological Rescue Unit (KARU) gained the contract to investigate the area prior to construction, excavating an area of 2500 square metres in March and April 1984. In doing so they discovered 50 further inhumations. The project was again directed by Brian Philp, who was assisted by Derek Garrod and Peter Keller, with a further 54 archaeologists working on the project; they were members of such community groups as the Bromley and West Kent Archaeological Group, the Bromley Training School, Orpington and District Archaeological Society, the Thameside Archaeological Group, and the Dover Archaeological Group. A further inhumation was discovered nearby in 1986. The skeletal remains uncovered were studied by Elizabeth Rega of the University of Sheffield, funded by a 1993 grant from the British Academy. Following an appeal in the Kent Archaeological Review, much of the post-excavation work was funded with an £800 donation from Diana Briscoe. The results of these 1980s excavations were written up by Philp and published by KARU in 2002. Archaeologist Martin Welch stated that Polhill remained the "most fully published" 7th- and early 8th-century cemetery in Kent until the excavation and publication of Springhead.

== See also ==
- List of Anglo-Saxon cemeteries
- Buckland Anglo-Saxon cemetery
- Finglesham Anglo-Saxon cemetery
- Mill Hill Anglo-Saxon cemetery
