= List of Anglo-Saxon cemeteries =

Anglo-Saxon cemeteries have been found in England, Wales and Scotland. The burial sites date primarily from the fifth century to the seventh century AD, before the Christianisation of Anglo-Saxon England. Burial rites include both inhumation and cremation, sometimes within the same cemetery; which factors governed the mode of burial is debated. Inhumation burials before the late seventh century were not uniformly oriented and included a wide range of grave goods. High status burials sometimes had burial furniture, such as burial beds. Grave goods were often placed with the body, and included jewellery, (especially Anglo-Saxon brooches and beads) weapons (swords, spears and shields) and household items, including girdle hangers and keys. Individuals were sometimes buried with others in multiple burials or with complete horses or dogs.

Later Anglo-Saxon period cemeteries (from the 9th to 11th century) tend to follow the Christian practice of east-west oriented burials, typically with very few grave goods. The lack of dress items (brooches, buckles, etc.) suggests that shroud burial was normalised by this period.

== List of Anglo Saxon Cemeteries ==
This is a partial list of Anglo-Saxon Cemeteries.

| Cemetery Name | Location | Time period of burials | No of burials | Discovery | Notes |
|---|---|---|---|---|---|
| Abingdon | Abingdon, Oxfordshire | 5th to early 6th centuries CE | 204 | 1934 | Bronze Age barrow discovered on cemetery site. Seventy-three inhumations had grave goods, including brooches, buckles, spears and knives. |
| Aldbourne | Aldbourne, Wiltshire | 7th to 8th centuries CE | 26 | 2007 | |
| Alton | Alton, Hampshire | 5th to 6th centuries CE | 41 | 1960-1961 | |
| Apple Down | Apple Down, Sussex | 5th to 7th centuries CE | 121 | 1982-1987 | |
| Barnstaple | Barnstaple, Devon | 10th century CE | 105 | 1970s | |
| Bekesbourne Aerodrome | Bekesbourne, Kent | 6th century CE | 41 | 1955-1959 | |
| Bergh Apton | Bergh Apton, Norfolk | late 5th to late 6th centuries CE | 63 | 1973 | Burial finds, including fragments of a lyre are held at the Norwich Castle Museum |
| Berinsfield | Berinsfield, South Oxfordshire | 5th to early 7th centuries CE | 118 | 1974 | Multiple brooches and a variety of brooch types found in female graves. |
| Blacknall Field | Pewsey, Wiltshire | late 5th century to mid 6th centuries CE | 110 | 1970 | 50 graves contained metalwork, including swords, scabbards, spears, hilts, knives, belts, buckles, bowls, jewellery |
| Bowl Hole | Bamburgh, Northumberland | 6th to 7th centuries CE | 100+ | 1997 | Final phase burial ground, cist burials |
| Buckland | Dover, Kent | late 5th to mid 8th centuries CE | 420 | 1951 and 1994 | Graves included examples of both pagan and Early Christian burial rituals. Later excavations found more burials a short distance away. |
| Caister-on-Sea | Caister-on-Sea, Norfolk | ? | ? | 1954, 1979 excavation | Anglian cemetery with boat burials. |
| Cleatham | Cleatham, North Lincolnshire | 5th to early 7th centuries CE | 1508 | 1984–1989 excavation | 1204 cremation urns |
| Collingbourne Ducis | Collingbourne Ducis, Wiltshire | 5th to 7th centuries CE | 120 | 1974 | The largest number of burial remains in Anglo-Saxon Wiltshire. Includes a bed burial |
| Elsham | North Lincolnshire | 5th to early 7th centuries CE | 552 | 1975–1976 excavation | 552 cremation burials containing 564 individuals (due to multiple burials). Seven early medieval inhumations and two Bronze Age inhumations. |
| Edix Hill | Barrington, Cambridgeshire | mid 6th to early 7th centuries CE | 300 | 1989–1991 excavation | Unusual furnished bed burial/skeleton determined to have leprous changes |
| Finglesham | Sandwich, Kent | 6th to 8th centuries CE | 201 | 1928 | Burial mound cemetery |
| Fordcroft | Orpington, London | 5th to 6th centuries CE | 71 | 1965 | Site of mixed cremations and inhumations. Evidence of Romano-British occupation at site. |
| Great Chesterford | Great Chesterford, Essex | | 161 | 1952 | An unusually large number of children's graves |
| Great Ryburgh | Great Ryburgh, Norfolk | 7th to 9th centuries CE | 89 | 2016 | 81 rare hollowed out tree trunk coffins and 8 plank lined graves |
| Harford Farm | Markshall, Norfolk | late 7th century | 46 | 1932 | Multiple period site, multiple burials with grave goods. |
| Illington | Illington, Norfolk | 6th to 7th centuries CE | 203 | 1949 | Largely cremation cemetery with three inhumations. |
| Jarrow Monastery | Jarrow, Northumbria | 7th to 11th centuries CE | 132 | 1963–1969 Excavation | Predominantly male burials. |
| Lovedon Hill | Loveden, Lincolnshire | 5th to 7th centuries CE | 32+ inhumations, 1297+ cremations | 1925 | Glass claw beakers, bronze hanging bowls, coptic bowl |
| Lower Farm | Bishop's Cleeve, Gloucestershire | 6th century CE | 26 | 1969 | One grave contained a snaffle bit, rare in an Anglo-Saxon context. |
| Mill Hill | Deal, Kent | 7th century CE | 112+ | 1940 | inhumation only cemetery. |
| Mucking | Mucking, Essex | 5th to early 7th centuries CE | 800 | 1965–1978 excavation | The cemetery is on the same site as Romano-British settlement. |
| Norton-on-Tees | Norton-on-Tees, County Durham | 6th to early 7th centuries CE | 120 | 1982 | In 2012, the skeletal remains from the burial site were loaned to the University of York for stable isotope analysis to determine the origin of the individuals. |
| Overstone | Overstone, Northamptonshire | 5th to 11th centuries CE | 154 | 2019 | Over 3000 grave goods found including jewellery, weapons and household items. The remains of an Anglo-Saxon settlement was also uncovered. |
| Ozengell | Monkton, Thanet, Kent | 5th to 11th centuries CE | 94 | 1846 | Several graves included post holes, which indicate timber structures related to the burials. |
| Polhill | Sevenoaks, Kent | 7th to 8th centuries CE | 200–220 | 1984–1986 excavation | See Polhill Anglo-Saxon cemetery |
| Raunds Furnells | Northamptonshire | 10th century CE | 363 | 1975 | Christian burial rituals, no grave goods |
| Saltwood Tunnel | Saltwood, Kent | 6th to 7th centuries CE | 217 | | Three separate inhumation cemeteries |
| Sancton I | Sancton, East Yorkshire | 5th to 7th centuries CE | 365 | 1976–80 | Largely cremations, with one inhumation found. |
| Sancton II | Sancton, East Yorkshire | 6th century CE | | | Mixed rite cemetery, 1.5 km away from Sancton I. |
| Sarre | Sarre, Kent | 5th to 7th centuries CE | 400 | 1860 | Site part of earlier Iron Age settlement. Sarre brooch. |
| Scremby | Skegness, Lincolnshire | 5th to 6th centuries CE | 49 | 2018–2019 | Furnished graves |
| Sedgeford | Sedgeford, Norfolk | 7th to 9th centuries CE | 400+ | 1957–2007 | Cemetery first discovered in the early 20th century, with further excavations 1957–60. More extensive excavations by Sedgeford Historical and Archaeological Research Project found the bulk of the remains between 1996–2007. Burials follow a broadly Christian rite, buried in an east-west alignment with no grave goods. |
| Sewerby | Sewerby, East Yorkshire | 5th to 7th centuries CE | 50+ | 1959 and 1974 | Contained a supine individual, buried with arms and legs splayed, thought to have been buried live possibly as a sacrifice. |
| Shrubland Hall Quarry, | Coddenham, Suffolk | 7th century CE | 50 | 1999 | Multiple bed burials |
| Snape | Aldeburgh, Suffolk | 6th to 7th centuries CE | | 1824–1992 | Boat Burial, Snape Ring. |
| Spong Hill | North Elmham, Norfolk | 5th century CE | 2600 | 1970's excavation | The largest early Anglo-Saxon burial site excavated in England. |
| Stanton | Ixworth, Suffolk | 5th to 7th centuries CE | 70 | 2013 | Cemetery built on earlier site of Bronze Age round barrow. |
| Street House | Loftus, North Yorkshire | Mid to late 7th century CE | 109 | 2005–2007 excavation | The cemetery included a female bed burial, which contained cabochon pendants and a gold shield-shaped pendant. |
| Stretton-on-Fosse | Stretton-on-Fosse, Warwickshire | Late fifth to sixth centuries CE | 53 | 1968—1970 excavation | The cemetery included a variety of brooches in different styles, amber and glass beads, spears, and shield bosses |
| Sutton Hoo | Woodbridge, Suffolk | 6th to early 7th centuries CE | Unknown | Ship uncovered in 1939 | Burial site contains undisturbed ship burial, execution burials, multiple important artifacts. See Sutton Hoo |
| Swallowcliffe Down | Swallowcliffe, Wiltshire | 7th century CE | ? | 1966 | Archaeologists discovered the richest and most complex female grave, bed burial ever discovered in England |
| Tranmer House | Bromeswell, Suffolk | 5th to 6th centuries CE | 34+ | 2000 | Partially excavated mixed rite cemetery, dates immediately prior to Sutton Hoo |
| Trumpington | Trumpington, Cambridgeshire | Mid 7th centuries CE | 4 | 2011 | Bed burial of teenage girl, which included a rare gold pectoral cross inlaid with garnets, the three other burials were all females. |
| Updown (Eastry III) | Eastry, Kent | 7th century CE | c. 300 | 1973 | Excavated in 1976 and 1989, investigating 78 burials – all inhumations. The site measures approximated 150 by 80 metres (490 by 260 ft). |
| Walkington Wold | Walkington, Yorkshire | | 12 | 1967 | Execution cemetery |
| Wasperton | Wasperton, Warwickshire | 5th century CE | 140 | 1980 | Roman/Anglo Saxon Cemetery. 116 inhumations and 24 cremations were determined to be Anglo-Saxon. 40 inhumations have been determined to be Roman, 44 inhumations could not be dated. The graves included spears, shields, knives, brooches and beads. |
| Wendover | Wendover, Buckinghamshire | 5th to 6th centuries CE | 141 | 2021 | 138 graves uncovered, with 141 inhumation burials and 5 cremation burials. The graves included a silver zoomorphic ring, iron spearhead, male skeleton with an iron spear point lodged in his spine, copper alloy tweezers. |
| Wolverton | Wolverton, Buckinghamshire | Late 6th to 7th century CE | 76 | 2007-2008 | Seventy-six graves were excavated, containing eighty inhumation burials: five empty graves, two urned cremations and two possible disturbed cremations were also recorded |
| Worthy Park | Kings Worthy, Hampshire | 7th century CE | 140 | excavation 1961–1962 | 46 urned cremation burials which included primarily combs and grooming tools |

== See also ==
- Burial in Anglo-Saxon England
- Bed burial
- List of Anglo-Saxon bed burials
- Sutton Hoo
