= Bergh Apton Anglo-Saxon cemetery =

Anglo-Saxon burial site in Norfolk, England

Coordinates: 52.5502°N 1.4017°E

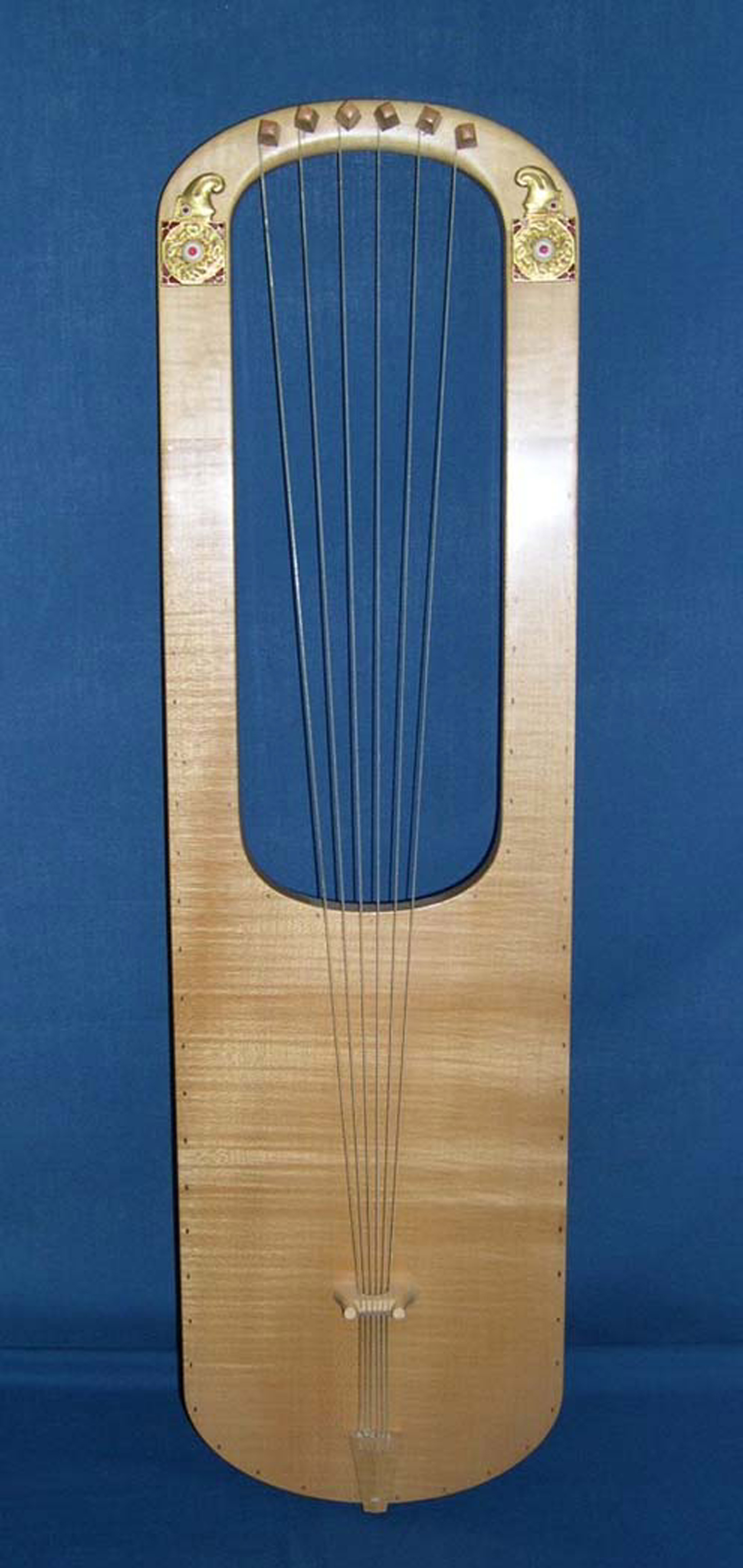
Reconstruction of the lyre from the Sutton Hoo ship-burial. A similar instrument was excavated at Bergh Apton.

Bergh Apton Anglo-Saxon cemetery is a late-5th to late-6th century Anglo-Saxon burial site discovered at Bergh Apton, Norfolk. The site was excavated in 1973 and 63 graves were found. The south and west portions of the site had previously been destroyed. The state of preservation of the skeletal remains was described as "very poor" due to the acidity of the soil and the sex of individuals was determined by grave goods. Grave goods found at the site included weapons, shields, spears and jewellery. One grave, possibly of a minstrel-poet, was found to contain a lyre similar to that found at Sutton Hoo. Twelve of the graves were those of children aged under 12 years. No evidence for an Anglo-Saxon settlement adjacent to the cemetery has been found.

The artefacts are currently held by Norwich Castle Museum.

== See also ==
- Burial in Early Anglo-Saxon England
- List of Anglo-Saxon cemeteries
