= Eaves-drip burial =

Anglo-Saxon burial practices

Eaves-drip burial refers to the medieval funerary custom in Britain of burying infants and young children next to building foundations in churchyard. Similar practices have begun to be explored in other regions of medieval Europe.

== History ==
Eaves-drip burials, the medieval custom of interring infants and small children next to churchyard foundations, were practiced during the 7th–12th centuries AD throughout Britain. This early Christian custom was first noticed during archaeological excavations (1977–1984) of an Anglo-Saxon cemetery at Raunds Furnells, Northamptonshire. Archaeologists uncovered a burial space within five feet (1.5 m) of the church foundation which contained several closely packed graves of newborn babies and infants under one year in age. At the Raunds Furnells site and later in several other medieval cemeteries, archaeologists have discovered the clustering of graves of infants and small children next to church walls.

According to archaeologist, Elizabeth Craig-Atkins, "The most consistently favored explanation for eaves-drip burial is that rain falling on the church roof would have become holy water by contact with a holy building, and then have fallen directly onto the zones of neonate and infant burials providing some form of posthumous reinforcement of the baptismal ritual". In Britain, eaves-drip burials suggest concerns that early Christians may have had about the afterlife and the effectiveness of baptism. The custom of placing infant graves under the eaves did not begin with the Anglo-Saxons. Several Roman texts describe the custom of burying infants who had not lived more than forty days under the eaves. Throughout history, differential treatment of infants during burial has been observed in all areas of Western Europe.

Eaves-drip burials were not practiced in all medieval cemeteries in Britain and the eaves-drip burial space in a few Christian cemeteries contained young children and one or two adults. The adults may possibly have been women who had died in childbirth. It has been suggested that some children and adults were buried under the eaves to benefit from the extra protection that the dripping of water off the consecrated roof provided. In the early period of use of the medieval cemetery at Whithorn in Scotland, an area under the eaves was used solely for infant burials. By the end of the eighth century, this exclusive burial ground was being used for children up to twelve years of age. Archaeological research has also uncovered the clustering of infants next to standing structures that were not churches within the cemetery grounds.

== List of eaves-drip burial sites ==
This is a partial list of eaves-drip burial cemeteries.

- Castle Green, Herefordshire
- Cherry Hinton, Cambridgeshire
- Jarrow, Tyne and Wear
- Pontefract, West Yorkshire
- Raunds Furnells, Northamptonshire
- Spofforth, North Yorkshire
- Thwing, East Yorkshire
- Whithorn, Dumfries and Galloway
- Winchester, Hampshire

== See also ==
- Burial in Anglo-Saxon England
- Cillín
- List of Anglo-Saxon cemeteries
- Italy in the Middle Ages
