= Overstone Anglo-Saxon cemetery =

Archaeological site in Northamptonshire, England

Overstone Anglo-Saxon cemetery is an Anglo-Saxon place of burial discovered at the Overstone Leys housing development site near the village of Overstone, Northamptonshire. The burial site was found during an archaeological investigation in 2019, prior to the start of the new project. It is the biggest Anglo-Saxon cemetery ever found in Northamptonshire. The 15 hectare site was excavated in 2019 by the Museum of London Archaeology over a 12 month period. Uncovered during the excavation were 154 individual graves and 3000 artefacts. Included in the individual burials were many grave goods, consisting primarily of jewellery and weapons. Household objects, personal items and a few textile fragments were also found. The several pieces of jewellery included 150 brooches, 15 rings, 75 bracelets, 15 chatelains and over 2000 beads. The weapons found were: 25 spears, 40 knives and 15 shield bosses.

A group of 22 previously unknown Anglo-Saxon era structures were also found at the site. The assemblage was a combination of sunken-feature buildings and post-built structures. An additional 20 buildings were found spread throughout the 15-hectare (37-acre) site, most likely the remains of field system buildings. Along with the Anglo-Saxon finds, evidence of prehistoric settlements were uncovered by the archeologists. Three Bronze Age round barrows, 46 prehistoric burials, and four Bronze Age structures were identified. The earliest prehistoric monuments were determined to have been built between c. 2000–1900 BC.

== See also ==
- Burial in Early Anglo-Saxon England
- List of Anglo-Saxon cemeteries
- Anglo-Saxon brooches
