= Pollhill =

Hamlet in Kent, England

Coordinates: 51°14′23″N 0°39′51″E

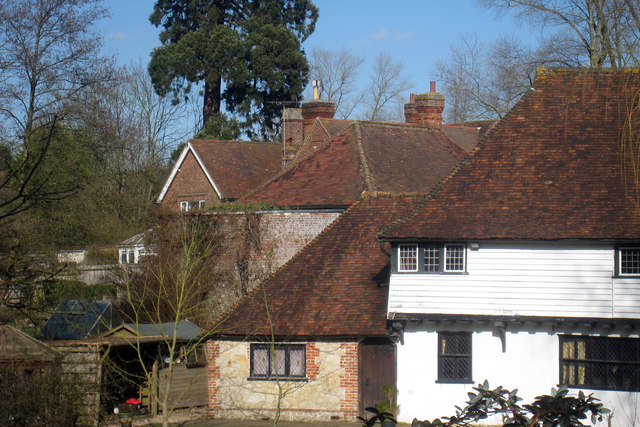
Oast house at Pollhill

Pollhill is a hamlet in the parish of Harrietsham near the town of Maidstone in Kent, England.
