= Finglesham Anglo-Saxon cemetery =

Archaeological site in the United Kingdom

- Location within Kent
- Established: 6th century CE
- Dissolved: 8th century CE
- Location: Finglesham, Kent
- Coordinates: 51.24°N 1.34°E
- Type: Anglo-Saxon inhumation cemetery

Finglesham Anglo-Saxon cemetery is a place of burial that was used from the sixth to the eighth centuries CE. It is located adjacent to the village of Finglesham, near Sandwich in Kent, South East England. Belonging to the Anglo-Saxon period, it was part of the much wider tradition of burial in Early Anglo-Saxon England.

Finglesham was an inhumation-only cemetery, with no evidence of cremation. Many of the dead were interred with grave goods, which included personal ornaments, weapons, and domestic items, and some had tumuli erected above their graves.

Coming under threat from chalk quarrying, the cemetery was first excavated by local archaeologists W.P.D. Stebbing and W. Whiting in 1928–29. After it was revealed that deep ploughing was becoming a threat to the site, further excavation took place under the finance of the Ministry of Public Building and Works between 1959 and 1967, directed by Sonia Chadwick Hawkes. What was thought to be the full extent of the cemetery was excavated, uncovering a total of 216 graves.

== Location ==
Finglesham Anglo-Saxon cemetery is located 4.5 kilometres south of Sandwich, and 2 kilometres south-east of Eastry, in eastern Kent. It sits near the centre of the historic parish of Northbourne. Elevated at 30 metres OD, the cemetery is situated atop a visually prominent knoll of chalk downland which offers panoramic views to the north, and which can be seen from a distance. Below the cemetery is a spring that supplies one of the tributaries of the North Stream; this would have likely provided an important source of fresh water in the Anglo-Saxon period. Geologically, the site is situated on Upper Chalk cut by some natural pipes containing clay-with-flints.

The earlier late Romano-British Court Road cemetery was located 700 metres to the east of Finglesham cemetery, on a slightly higher area of downland. Finglesham Anglo-Saxon cemetery would have served a local community, and although no settlement has been identified, archaeologists suggest that it was probably close to the fresh water supply, in the vicinity of contemporary Finglesham or West Street. The name Finglesham comes from the Old English Pengelshām, meaning "the Prince's manor of homestead." No evidence for a royal or particularly high status burial has been discovered from the cemetery, so it has been suggested that the estate around Finglesham might have been owned by a Kentish prince even though he was buried elsewhere, probably at Eastry.

== Background ==
The Kingdom of Kent.

With the advent of the Anglo-Saxon period in the fifth century CE, the area that became Kent underwent a radical transformation on a political, social, and physical level. In the preceding era of Roman Britain, the area had been administered as the civitas of Cantiaci, a part of the Roman Empire, but following the collapse of Roman rule in 410 CE, many signs of Romano-British society began to disappear, replaced by those of the ascendant Anglo-Saxon culture. Later Anglo-Saxon accounts attribute this change to the widescale invasion of Germanic language tribes from northern Europe, namely the Angles, Saxons, and Jutes. Archaeological and toponymic evidence shows that there was a great deal of syncretism, with Anglo-Saxon culture interacting and mixing with the Romano-British culture.

The Old English term Kent first appears in the Anglo-Saxon period, and was based on the earlier Celtic-language name Cantii. Initially applied only to the area east of the River Medway, by the end of the sixth century it also referred to areas to the west of it. The Kingdom of Kent was the first recorded Anglo-Saxon kingdom to appear in the historical record, and by the end of the sixth century, it had become a significant political power, exercising hegemony over large parts of southern and eastern Britain. At the time, Kent had strong trade links with Francia, while the Kentish royal family married members of Francia's Merovingian dynasty, who were already Christian. Kentish King Æthelberht was the overlord of various neighbouring kingdoms when he converted to Christianity in the early seventh century as a result of Augustine of Canterbury and the Gregorian mission, who had been sent by Pope Gregory to replace England's pagan beliefs with Christianity. It was in this context that the Finglesham cemetery was in use.

Kent has a wealth of Early Medieval funerary archaeology. The earliest excavation of Anglo-Saxon Kentish graves was in the 17th century, when antiquarians took an increasing interest in the material remains of the period. In the ensuing centuries, antiquarian interest gave way to more methodical archaeological investigation, and prominent archaeologists like Bryan Faussett, James Douglas, Cecil Brent, George Payne, and Charles Roach Smith "dominated" archaeological research in Kent.

== Cemetery features ==
Hawkes used what was known about the absolute chronology of Early Medieval Kent to date the Finglesham cemetery as having been used between 525 and 725 CE. Subsequent revaluations have argued that the start date is a little earlier, at around 500 CE. The majority of the graves date to the seventh century CE, while the richest grave-goods come from the early and middle 6th century. Similarly adorned burials can be found at contemporary cemeteries like Bifrons, Lyminge, Deal, Mill Hill, and Dover Buckland.

The cemetery was roughly triangular or trapezoidal in shape, with maximum dimensions of 70 metres by 80 metres, thereby covering around half a hectare. The western boundary of the cemetery is marked by the Whiteway track, which is of unknown date. If older than the cemetery, it could be that the site's planners intentionally used it to mark out their space, but it could be that it was later developed by travellers who wished to pass by the cemetery without walking over it. The north-western side of the site had been destroyed by quarrying, so it is unknown if this was marked in any way.

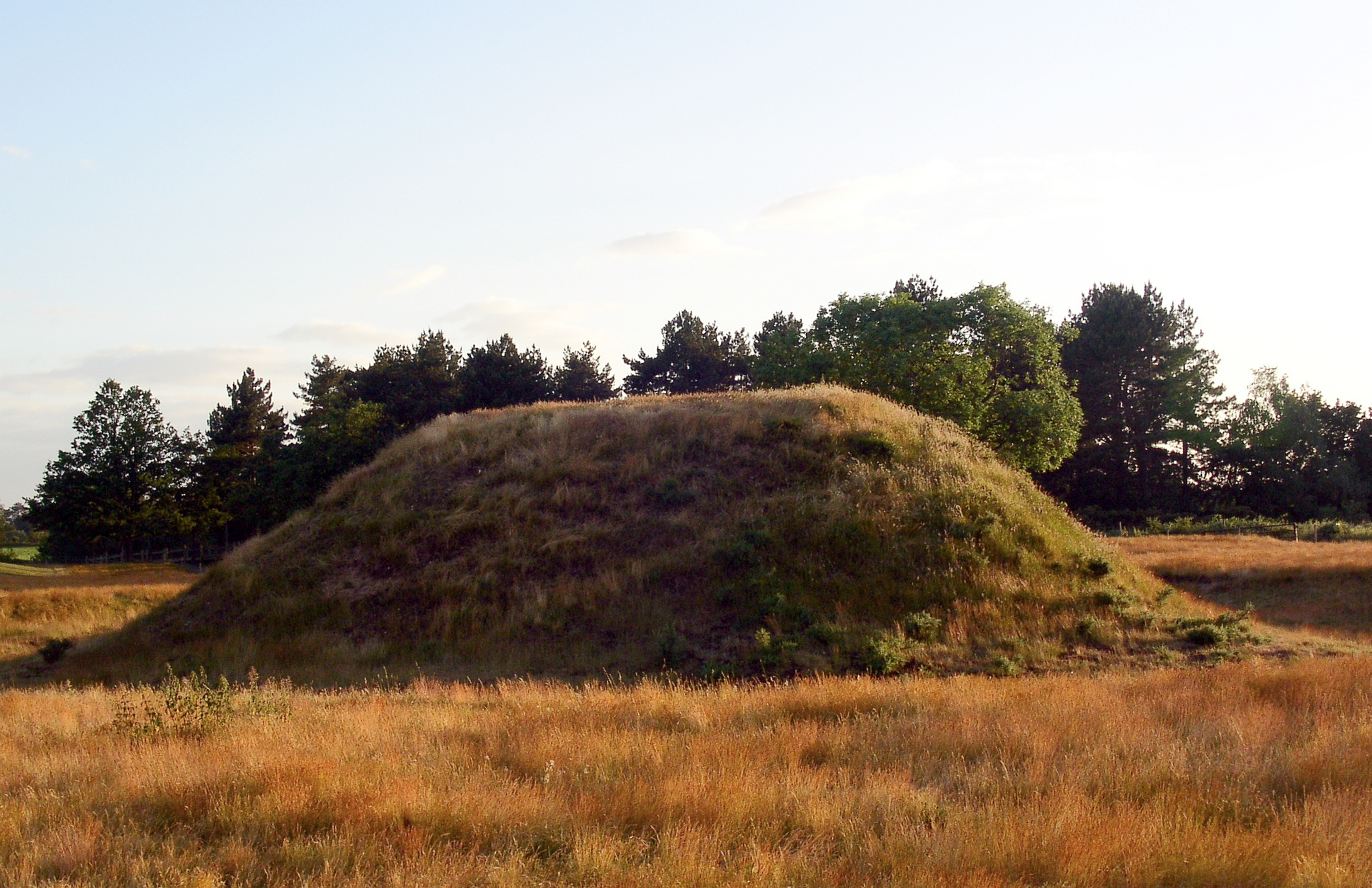
Small tumuli would have covered a number of the burials at Finglesham. This is a larger example from Sutton Hoo in Suffolk.

Encircling ring ditches have been identified on many of the graves, meaning that it was a barrow cemetery. Most were located on the cemetery's south-eastern edge. The largest, over Grave 204, would have been particularly prominent and could have served as a local landmark.

== Grave goods ==
=== The Finglesham Man ===
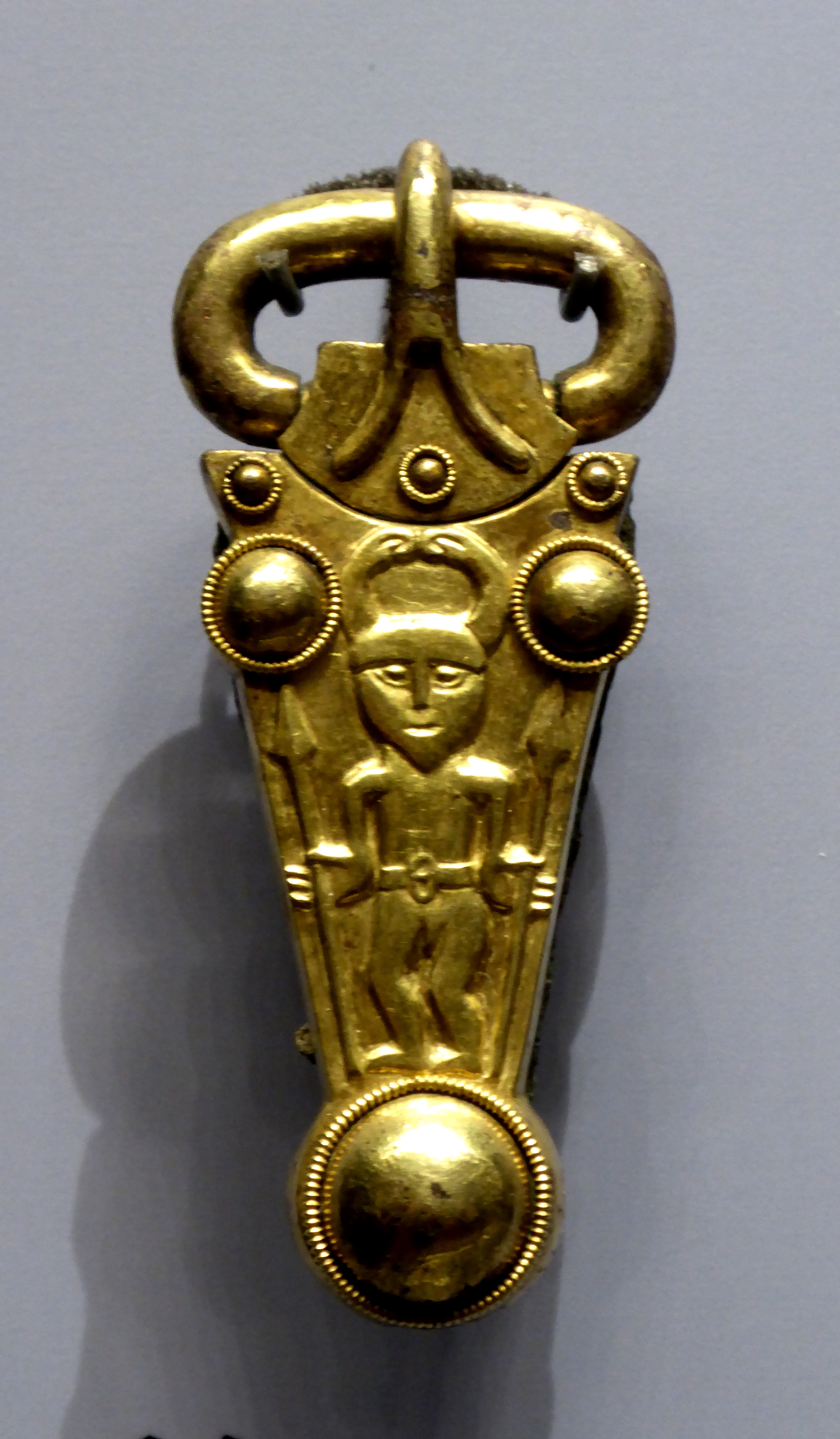
The Finglesham Buckle

== Archaeological investigation ==
=== William Stebbing and William Whiting's investigation ===
In late 1928, the cemetery came to the attention of two local archaeologists, William Stebbing and William Whiting. Whiting had been informed by local farmer Percy Steed that a number of human bones had been found near to a chalk pit adjacent to one of his fields. Chalk was continually being extracted for use in local road construction, and Whiting feared that the archaeology of the site would soon be destroyed. Organising an investigation, Reginald Smith of the British Museum visited to confirm the date of the bones, after which the Council of the Kent Archaeological Society offered £5 towards the financing of a rescue excavation. Raising a total of £70 in ten days, Stebbing and Whiting hired several labourers to carry out an excavation of the area closest to the chalk hole, being assisted in this by another local archaeologist, Cecil Knox. Excavating a total of 38 graves, they published a report of their findings in 1929.

The artefacts uncovered by the excavation were then divided between themselves and the local landowner, Lord Northbourne, the latter of whom kept the finer jewellery. Stebbing and Whiting wanted a wider audience for the finds, and put them on display at an exhibit at the Mason Dieu at Ospringe near Faversham. In June 1963, Gerald Dunning, then Inspector of Ancient Monuments for the Ministry of Public Building and Works, had the artefacts moved to a more local display in the gatehouse of Deal Castle. In the late 1980s they were moved again, this time to Deal Public Library, the exhibit was decommissioned in 1992, with the objects placed into storage at Dover Museum.

=== Sonia Hawkes' investigation ===
In 1956, young archaeologist Sonia Hawkes took an interest in the material from Finglesham, and was involved in a project to conserve the known artefacts through the Ancient Monuments Laboratory. From this research, she produced a paper reconsidering the evidence from the site. Published by the Society for Medieval Archaeology in 1958, it has been described as one of the "first modern studies" of Anglo-Saxon grave material from East Kent, and was an influence on a number of subsequent studies. Visiting the site, she noted that not only had further chalk quarrying taken place, but that the site was under threat from deep ploughing. She initiated a program of excavation funded by the Ministry of Public Building and Works, which would last for 19 weeks from 1959 and 1967, during which the entire presumed cemetery area was excavated. During this project, 216 graves were excavated; among these were around 38 graves that had been previously identified by Stebbing and Whiting. The grave goods uncovered remained in the possession of the landowner, Lord Northbourne, although Hawkes put many of them into the care of the Ashmolean Museum.

Undertaking post-excavation work on the material uncovered, between 1980 and 1987 Hawkes received funding from English Heritage as part of their Backlogue Programme for excavations undertaken before 1972. The task of putting together the grave inventory and analysing the evidence was passed to Hawkes' Research Assistant at the Ashmolean Museum's Institute of Archaeology, Guy Grainger, who had largely finished this task by 1984. While continuing to assemble the excavation report, Hawkes authored and published 11 articles on different aspects of Finglesham in such outlets as Medieval Archaeology and Antiquity journals. Brugmann opined that these publications soon exhibited "a considerable influence" on Anglo-Saxon cemetery studies.

By 1991, the cemetery data was still unpublished, although Hawkes had privately stated her intent to achieve this in the following few years. She died in 1999, leaving the manuscript unpublished. Hawkes' literary executors, Helena Hamerow and Jean Cook, obtained the Finglesham site records, documentation of post-excavation work, and correspondence, and placed it in Hawkes Archive at the institute. English Heritage agreed to finance the editorial work to get the original data written up and published, but had insufficient funds to pay for the publication of a wider analysis. The excavation report was finally published in 2007, with archaeologist Birte Brugmann noting that it would make the material more accessible and "considerably improve" the Kentish cemetery sample.

== See also ==
- Polhill Anglo-Saxon cemetery
- List of Anglo-Saxon cemeteries
- Updown early medieval cemetery – also excavated by Sonia Chadwick Hawkes
