= Wasperton =

Village in Warwickshire, England

Coordinates: 52.22677°N 1.61199°W

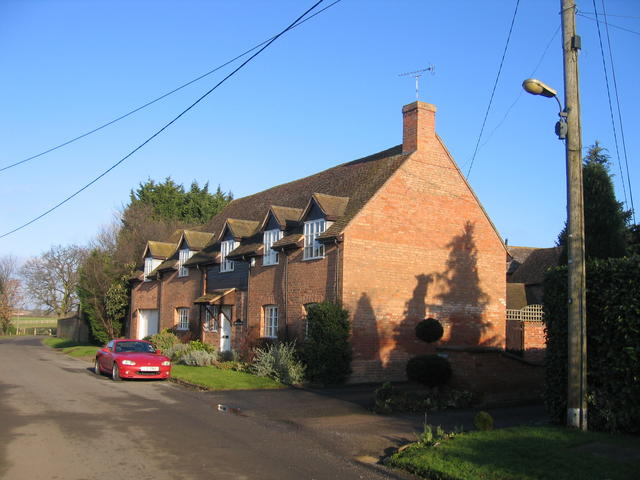
Wasperton cottages

Wasperton is a village and civil parish in the English county of Warwickshire. The population of the civil parish at the 2011 census was 153. It is on the east bank of the River Avon and is some 5 miles (8 km) south of the town of Warwick which is easily accessed by the A429 road. Between 1980 and 1985 extensive excavations in advance of gravel digging revealed a cemetery which contained both Roman and Anglo-Saxon graves. There were over 200 inhumations and 26 cremation burials uncovered. 116 inhumations and 24 cremations were determined to be Anglo-Saxon. 40 inhumations have been determined to be Roman, 44 inhumations could not be dated. The graves included spears, shields, knives, brooches and beads.
