= Illington =

Village in Norfolk, England

Coordinates: 52.47308°N 0.866831°E

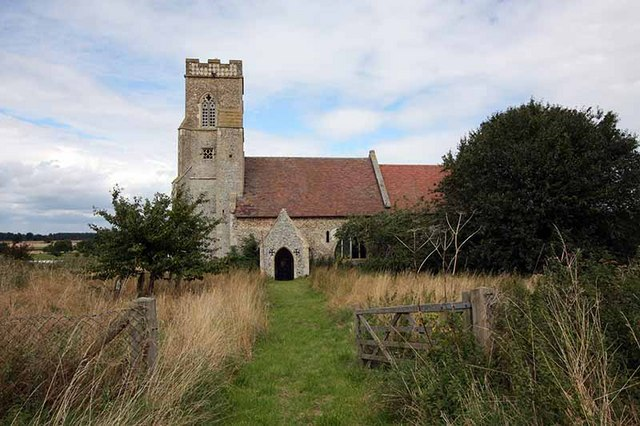
- St. Andrew's Church

- Location within Norfolk
- OS grid reference: TL9489
  - London: 92.3 miles (148.5 km)
- Civil parish: Wretham
- District: Breckland
- Shire county: Norfolk
- Region: East
- Country: England
- Sovereign state: United Kingdom
- Post town: THETFORD
- Postcode district: IP24
- Dialling code: 01953
- UK Parliament: Mid Norfolk

Illington is a village and former civil parish, now in the parish of Wretham, in the Breckland district, in the English county of Norfolk.

Illington is located 6.2 miles (10.0 km) north-east of Thetford and 24 miles (39 km) south-west of Norwich.

== History ==
Illington's name is of Anglo-Saxon origin and derives from the Old English for the farmstead of Illa's people.

In the Domesday Book, Illington is listed as a settlement of 24 households in the hundred of Shropham. In 1086, the village was part of the East Anglian estates of William de Warenne.

On 1 April 1935, the parish was abolished to form Wretham.

== Geography ==
In 1931, the parish had a population of 53, this was the last time separate population statistics were collected for Illington as in 1935 the parish was merged into Wretham.

== St. Andrew's Church ==
Illington's church is dedicated to Saint Andrew and dates from the Fifteenth Century. St. Andrew's is located on Illington Road and has been Grade II listed since 1958.

St. Andrew's was restored in the Victorian era and is today in the care of the Norfolk Churches Trust. The church also holds a memorial cross to the only First World War casualty from Illington, who is listed as Lieutenant William A. Harvey of No. 8 Squadron RFC who died as a transferring prisoner of war on 7 November 1917 and is buried in St. Martin's Churchyard, Vevey.

== Governance ==
Illington is part of the electoral ward of Upper Wensum for local elections and is part of the district of Breckland.

The village's national constituency is Mid Norfolk which has been represented by the Conservative's George Freeman MP since 2010.
