= Burial in Anglo-Saxon England =

Details of Anglo-Saxon burials in England

Burial in Anglo-Saxon England refers to the grave and burial customs followed by the Anglo-Saxons between the mid 5th and 11th centuries CE in Early Mediaeval England. The variation of the practice performed by the Anglo-Saxon peoples during this period, included the use of both cremation and inhumation. There is a commonality in the burial places between the rich and poor – their resting places sit alongside one another in shared cemeteries. Both of these forms of burial were typically accompanied by grave goods, which included food, jewelry, and weaponry. The actual burials themselves, whether of cremated or inhumed remains, were placed in a variety of sites, including in cemeteries, burial mounds or, more rarely, in ship burials.

Within the areas of Anglo-Saxon settlement, there was both regional and temporal variation while burial practices. The early Anglo-Saxons were followers of a pagan religion, which is reflected in their burials from this time, while they later converted to Christianity in the seventh and eighth centuries CE, which was again reflected in their burial practices, when cremation ceased to be practised and inhumation became the sole form of burial, typically being concentrated in Christian cemeteries located adjacent to churches.

In the eighteenth century, antiquarians took an interest in these burials, and began excavating them, although more scientific excavation only began in the twentieth century with the development of archaeology. Prominent Anglo-Saxon burials that have since been discovered and excavated include the early cemetery of Spong Hill in Norfolk and the great sixth-seventh century ship burial of Sutton Hoo in Suffolk.

== History ==
A map showing the general locations of the Anglo-Saxon peoples around the year 600, based upon Bede's account

The early Anglo-Saxon period in England lasted from the fifth to the eighth centuries CE, during which time burial was the common custom for disposing of the dead. Archaeologists believe that the treatment of the deceased was important to Anglo-Saxons due to the "rich variation" in burial rites from this era, and that different forms of burial reflect differences in the status, wealth, sex and/or gender, age, and tribal affiliation of the dead. There was greater variation in burial types than at most earlier periods of British history, with early Anglo-Saxon graves differing greatly from those found in the preceding period of Roman Britain. The common Romano-British form of disposal was inhumation, although some rare cremations had taken place.

During the Anglo-Saxon migration, which began in the fifth century CE, Germanic-speaking tribes from continental northern Europe, such as the Angles, Jutes and Saxons, arrived in Britain, where their own culture—with its accompanying language and pagan religion—became dominant across much of eastern Britain. Those Romano-British peoples still residing in these areas either adopted and integrated with this incoming culture or migrated westward. The Anglo-Saxons brought with them their own heterogeneous forms of burial practice, which were distinct from those of the British peoples living in western and northern Britain during the Early Medieval, having more in common with those of pagan continental Europe. However, not all of those given an Anglo-Saxon burial at this time were necessarily migrants or the descendants of migrants from continental Europe. Some may have been ethnically descended from the earlier Romano-British people, but had adopted Anglo-Saxon culture as it became dominant across southern and eastern Britain. An example of such cohabitation can be seen at Wasperton and Stretton-on-the-Fosse in Warwickshire, where Anglo-Saxon graves were found alongside those that were Romano-British in character.

In the seventh century, foreign Christian missionaries initiated the conversion of Anglo-Saxon England, with repercussions for burial practices. Though common in the fifth and sixth centuries, cremation rapidly declined as a form of burial, with few known later examples. The Christian Church initially objected little to grave goods, although there was a decline in their popularity as they came to be understood as irrelevant. Instances of rich grave goods would however continue into the eighth century.

== Early Anglo-Saxon period ==
=== Inhumations ===
Inhumation at Sutton Hoo under archaeological excavation

The most common way for Anglo-Saxon communities to deal with their dead was through inhumation, the burial of the corpse straight into the ground. This form of corpse disposal would have taken less "time and equipment" than cremation. Such inhumations remain an "invaluable resource" for understanding Early Medieval society.

In many cases, alkaline soils have led to the good preservation of the skeletal remains, enabling archaeologists to excavate inhumed corpses and gain "a great deal of information" from them. Data that can be gathered or inferred from Anglo-Saxon inhumations includes the biological sex or age of the individual, as well as information about their health or lifestyle. Isotopic analysis of the skeletons can be used to detect which region the individual grew up in.

Graves for Anglo-Saxon inhumations varied widely in size, from "a shallow scoop in the ground to a large pit with regular sides over 2 m[etres] long and over 1 m[etre] deep." Although most Anglo-Saxon inhumation burials were of individuals, it is "reasonably common" to find multiple burials from the period. These multiple burials most often contain a couple, quite commonly an adult and a child. In some rarer cases, there were three or more individuals buried in a single grave.

==== Positions ====
The bodies in Anglo-Saxon inhumations are found in a variety of positions. They have been found "placed on the back (supine), front (prone), or on one side. The legs can be arranged straight out, be crossed at the lower leg or ankle, be slightly bent (flexed), or even pulled right up to the chest in a foetal position (crouched or contracted)." According to archaeologist David Wilson, the "usual orientation" for pagan inhumations was with the head to the west and feet to the east, although there are many exceptions to this.

Those inhumations containing a corpse lying on their side may have been laid out for various reasons. At Horton Kirby in Kent, it appears that the corpses were bent into such a position in order to fit into their small graves. Contrastingly, other examples show side-orientated bodies placed into graves "of ample size and sometimes of quite large dimensions." Those Anglo-Saxon corpses that have been found prone, or face down in their grave, have been interpreted by some archaeologists as having been "live burials", where the individual was thrown into the grave and buried alive. Other archaeologists have interpreted such burials in different ways, leading Sam Lucy to claim that "There is probably no single explanation for the use of prone burial" amongst the Anglo-Saxons. "In some cases, it may be accidental, especially if the burial was in a coffin which had been clumsily handled. In other cases it might have specific significance attached to it".

==== Mutilations and decapitations ====
In some cases, the body was mutilated prior to burial, primarily through decapitation, and there are examples of entire cemeteries being filled with such corpses, leading archaeologists to conclude that these were sites specifically for the burial of executed individuals. There are few examples of these possible execution cemeteries from the early Anglo-Saxon period, with one exception being the barrow cemetery at Sutton Hoo in Suffolk. Here, several burials containing the corpses of individuals who had been hanged, beheaded, or in other ways mutilated were placed around Mound 5 on the eastern side of the cemetery. Using radiocarbon dating, archaeologists have determined that the earliest of these may well date from the seventh century CE, and that they continued to be deposited at the site into the ninth and tenth centuries. Later examples of probable Anglo-Saxon execution cemeteries that date from the tenth or eleventh centuries have been found at Five Knolls in Dunstable and Bran Ditch in Fowlmere.

There are also examples of decapitated corpses who have been buried in ordinary Anglo-Saxon cemeteries. One unusual example has been found at Loveden Hill in Lincolnshire, where one of the corpses had their head placed on their stomach, and an urn was placed where the head would have been. At Great Addington in Northamptonshire, three decapitated skeletons had been found with stones in place of their heads, while at Chadlington in Oxfordshire two corpses had their severed heads placed between their legs. At Mitcham in Surrey several inhumations contained extra heads, while other graves instead had none or had them placed at the corpses' feet. In some rare cases, at sites in Bideford-on-Avon in Warwickshire and Portway in Hampshire, skulls had been buried on their own by the Anglo-Saxons, without their accompanying bodies.

==== Ritual elements ====
Certain Anglo-Saxon burials appeared to have ritualistic elements to them, implying that a pagan religious rite was performed over them during the funeral. While there are many multiple burials, where more than one corpse was found in a single grave, that date from the Anglo-Saxon period, there is "a small group of such burials where an interpretation involving ritual practices may be possible". For instance, at Welbeck Hill in Lincolnshire, the corpse of a decapitated woman was placed in reverse on top of the body of an old man, while in a number of other similar examples, female bodies were again placed above those of men. This has led some archaeologists to suspect a form of suttee, where the female was the spouse of the male and was killed to accompany him upon death. Other theories hold that the females were slaves who were viewed as the property of the men, and who were again killed to accompany their master. Similarly, four Anglo-Saxon burials have been excavated where it appears that the individual was buried while still alive, which could imply that this was a part of either a religious rite or as a form of punishment.

=== Cremations ===
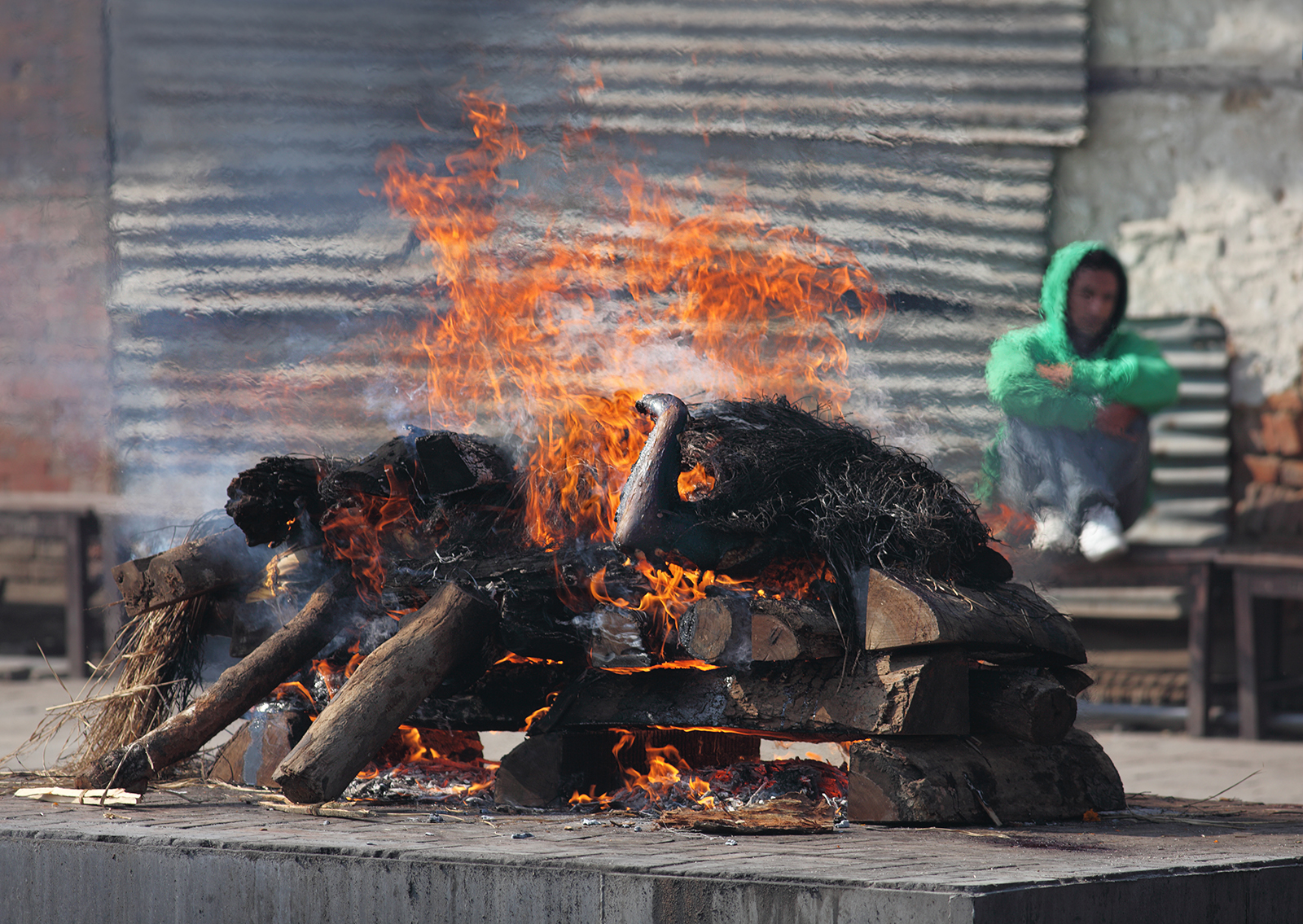
Anglo-Saxon cremation was open and public, like that in contemporary South Asia (pictured).

Alongside inhumation, it was common for early Anglo-Saxons to cremate their dead by burning the corpses and then burying the cremated remains within an urn. Cremation rites declined in the seventh century, but throughout that century remained a viable form of burial at sites like St Mary's Stadium in Southampton. Archaeologist Audrey Meaney suggested that cremation was performed to "release the spirit" from the body after death, while Howard Williams remarked that cremation rites presented "the public transformation of the dead body." Archaeological understandings of the Anglo-Saxon cremation processes have been largely reconstructed from an osteological analyses of the cemeteries at Spong Hill, Sancton, Elsham and Cleatham. The pyre sites are rarely archaeologically identifiable.

The method of Anglo-Saxon cremation is still debated; based on an examination of cremated remains at Illington, Calvin Wells speculated that at that site, the bodies had been laid out on the ground, with a pyre then built on top of them before being set alight. Wells believed that this would explain why the shoulder tips of corpses at the site were not always properly cremated. This idea was criticized by Jacqueline McKinley, who argued that such a process would lack sufficient oxygen to cremate the entire body. Instead, she argued that Anglo-Saxon cremation pyres were most likely a criss-cross of timbers filled with brushwood, with the corpse laid on top. The process of cremating the body would likely have been visible to onlookers, creating a connection between living and dead.

Following the cremation, the ashes and remains would have been collected and placed within an urn. It is not known how long the urn was kept before being buried; it is "very possible" that in certain cases they were stored above ground for "long periods of time". When buried, the urns were most often placed upright, although in a few rare examples they were instead inverted. At times they were buried individually, each in their own pit, although in other cases, several urns were clustered together in a burial pit.

==== Burial urns and grave goods ====
Anglo-Saxon burial urns were typically hand-made out of pottery and often decorated with various motifs. These included bosses, stamps and linear incised marks, as well as freehand designs. The most notable of these motifs was the swastika, which was widely inscribed not only on crematory urns but also on certain pieces of weaponry, various brooches, and other forms of (often female) jewelry. Archaeologist David Wilson remarked that the swastika "undoubtedly had special importance", suggesting that it was the symbol of the pagan god Thunor. He accepted that through increasing usage, it might have become a "purely decorative device with no real symbolic importance." Another symbol that appears on urns and other artefacts is the rune ᛏ; this represented the letter T and has been associated with the god Tiw.

Funerary urn from the Snape Anglo-Saxon Cemetery

In rare cases, such as at Baston, Lincolnshire, and Drayton, Norfolk, lids were made for these urns; the most elaborate known example – from Spong Hill, Norfolk – is decorated with a seated human figure with its head in its hands. Several examples used stones as lids. There are also a number of cases where "window urns" have been uncovered, containing pieces of glass inserted into the fabric of the pottery. Examples of this have been found at such sites as Castle Acre in Norfolk, Helpston in Nottinghamshire, and Haslington in Cambridgeshire. There are also a few rare cases, such as at Cleatham in Lincolnshire, where instead of making a new pot to bury cremated remains in, Anglo-Saxon peoples re-used older Late Romano-British period urns or pots in their funerary rites. In certain cases, pottery urns were substituted by bronze bowls, with examples being found at Sutton Hoo in Suffolk, at Coombe in Kent, at Illington in Norfolk, and at Snape in Suffolk.

Like inhumations, cremated remains were sometimes deposited along with grave goods, however sites containing grave goods constitute only "about half of the known cremations". Sometimes, these items were placed on the cremation pyre along with the corpse, and were therefore damaged by the fire. They were then placed, along with the skeletal remains, within an urn for burial. At other times, these grave goods were placed inside the urn unburnt, meaning that they remained intact and undamaged. The most common grave goods placed in cremation graves were "toilet implements", among them bronze and iron tweezers, razors and blades, shears and ear-scoops; some were full-sized, but others were miniatures of no practical use. Also common were bone and antler combs, some of which had been deliberately broken prior to inclusion.

== Burial places ==
=== Cemeteries ===
Archaeologists know of the existence of around 1,200 Anglo-Saxon cemeteries across England.

Archaeological investigation has displayed that structures or buildings were built inside a number of pagan cemeteries, and as David Wilson noted, "The evidence, then, from cemetery excavations is suggestive of small structures and features, some of which may perhaps be interpreted as shrines or sacred areas". In some cases, there is evidence of far smaller structures being built around or alongside individual graves, implying possible small shrines to the dead individual or individuals buried there. At the cemetery of Apple Down in Sussex, four-post structures were discovered, mostly situated over cremations, and the excavators Down and Welch theorized that these were the remains of small, roofed huts that contained the cremated deposits of a single-family.

==== Cemetery locations ====
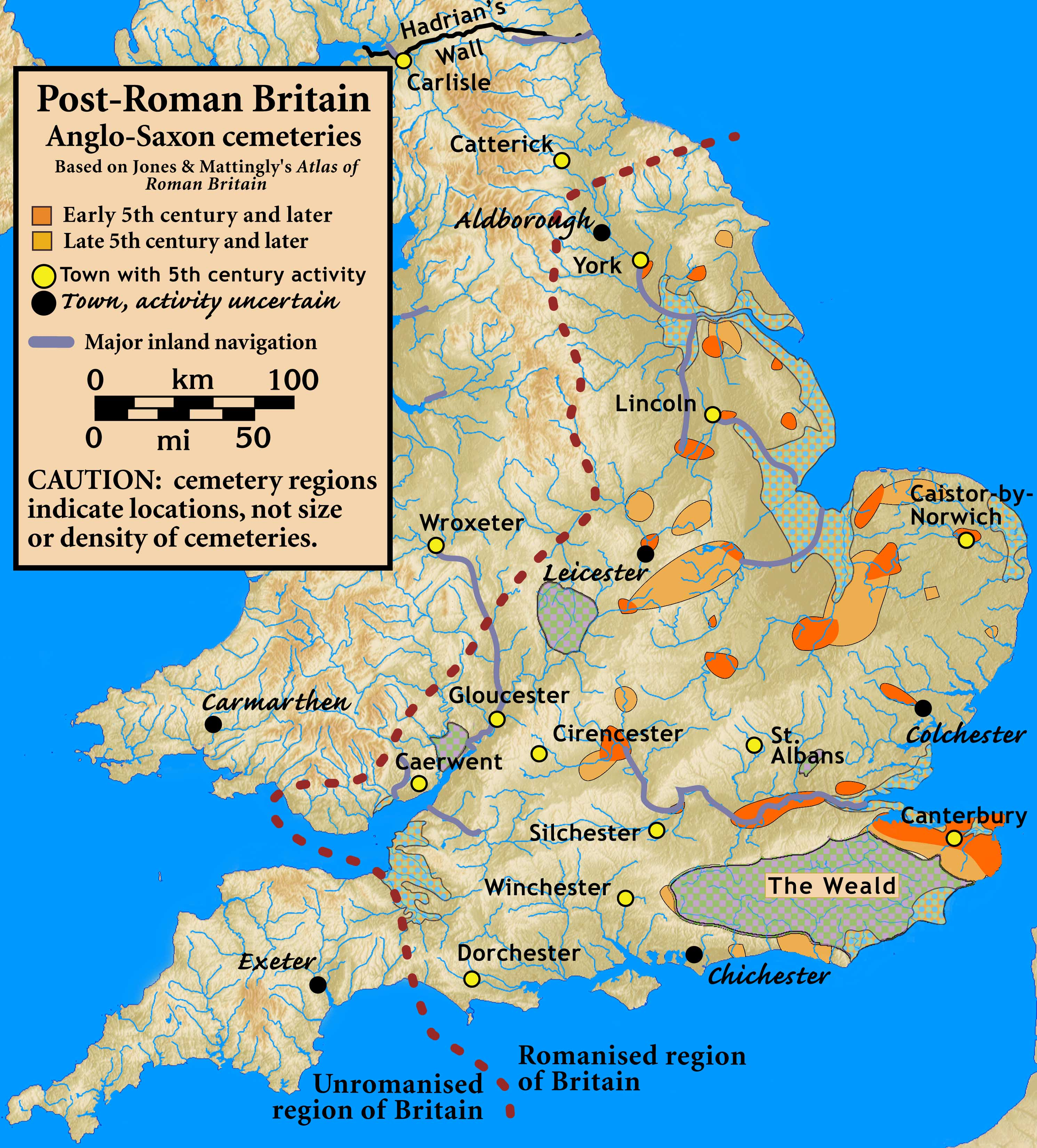
Early cemeteries of possible Settler origin

The earliest cemeteries that can be classified as Anglo-Saxon are found in widely separate regions and are dated to the early 5th century. The exception is in Kent, where the density of cemeteries and artefacts suggest either an exceptionally heavy Anglo-Saxon settlement, or continued settlement beginning at an early date, or both. By the late 5th century there were additional Anglo-Saxon cemeteries, some of them adjacent to earlier ones, but with a large expansion in other areas, and now including the southern coast of Sussex. Work at sites such as Spong Hill suggest some Germanic-speaking arrivals may have preceded AD 450.

==== Genetic results ====
Archaeogenetic studies, based on data collected from skeletons found in Iron Age, Roman and Anglo-Saxon era burials, have concluded that the ancestry of the modern English population contains large contributions from both Anglo-Saxon migrants and Romano-British natives.

==== Cemeteries as evidence of the Anglo-Saxon settlement ====
Up to the year 2000, roughly 10,000 early 'Anglo-Saxon' cremations and inhumations had been found, exhibiting a large degree of diversity in styles and types of mortuary ritual. This is consistent with evidence for many micro cultures and local practice.

Considering the early cemeteries of Kent, most relevant finds come from furnished graves with distinctive links to the Continent. However, there are some unique items, these include pots and urns and especially brooches, an important element of female dress that functioned as a fastener, rather like a modern safety pin. The style of brooches (called Quoits), is unique to southern England in the fifth century AD, with the greatest concentration of such items occurring in Kent. Seiichi Suzuki defines the style through an analysis of its design organisation, and, by comparing it with near-contemporary styles in Britain and on the continent, identifying those features which make it unique. He suggests that the quoit brooch style was made and remade as part of the process of construction of new group identities during the political uncertainties of the time, and sets the development of the style in the context of the socio-cultural dynamics of an emergent post-Roman society. The brooch shows that culture was not just transposed from the continent, but from an early phase a new "Anglo-Saxon" culture was being developed.

Women's fashions (native costumes not thought to have been trade goods), have been used to distinguish and identify settlers, supplemented by other finds that can be related to specific regions of the Continent. A large number of Frankish artefacts have been found in Kent, and these are largely interpreted to be a reflection of trade and commerce rather than early migration. Yorke (Wessex in the Early Middle Ages, 1995), for example, only allows that some Frankish settlement is possible. Frankish sea raiding was recorded as early as 260 and became common for the next century, but their raids on Britain ended c. 367 as Frankish interest turned southward and was thereafter focused on the control and occupation of northern Gaul and Germania.

The presence of artefacts that are identifiably North Germanic along the coastal areas between the Humber Estuary and East Anglia indicates that Scandinavians migrated to Britain. However, this does not suggest that they arrived at the same time as the Angles: they may have arrived almost a century later, and their status and influence upon arrival is uncertain. In particular, regarding a significant Swedish influence in association with the Sutton Hoo ship and a Swedish origin for the East Anglian Wuffinga dynasty, both possibilities are now considered uncertain.

The process of mixing and assimilation of immigrant and native populations is virtually impossible to elucidate with material culture, but the skeletal evidence may shed some light on it. The 7th/8th-century average stature of male individuals in Anglo-Saxon cemeteries dropped by 15 mm (5/8 in) compared with the 5th/6th-century average. This development is most marked in Wessex where the average dropped by 24 mm (1 in). This drop is not easily explained by environmental changes; there is no evidence for a change in diet in the 7th/8th centuries, nor is there any evidence of a further influx of immigrants at this time. Given the lower average stature of Britons, the most likely explanation would be a gradual Saxonisation or Anglicisation of the material culture of native enclaves, an increasing assimilation of native populations into Anglo-Saxon communities, and increasing intermarriage between immigrants and natives within Anglo-Saxon populations. Skeletal material from the Late Roman and Early Anglo-Saxon period from Hampshire was directly compared. It was concluded that the physical type represented in urban Roman burials, was not annihilated nor did it die-out, but it continued to be well represented in subsequent burials of Anglo-Saxon date.

At Stretton-on-Fosse II (Warwickshire), located on the western fringes of the early Anglo-Saxon settlement area, the proportion of male adults with weapons is 82%, well above the average in southern England. Cemetery II, the Anglo-Saxon burial site, is immediately adjacent to two Romano-British cemeteries, Stretton-on-Fosse I and III, the latter only 60 metres (200 feet) away from Anglo-Saxon burials. Continuity of the native female population at this site has been inferred from the continuity of textile techniques (unusual in the transition from the Romano-British to the Anglo-Saxon periods), and by the continuity of epigenetic traits from the Roman to the Anglo-Saxon burials. At the same time, the skeletal evidence demonstrates the appearance in the post-Roman period of a new physical type of males who are more slender and taller than the men in the adjacent Romano-British cemeteries. Taken together, the observations suggest the influx of a group of males, probably most or all of them Germanic, who took control of the local community and married native women. It is not easy to confirm such cases of 'warband' settlement in the absence of detailed skeletal, and other complementary, information, but assuming that such cases are indicated by very high proportions of weapon burials, this type of settlement was much less frequent than the kin group model.

Higham outlines the main questions:

"It is fairly clear that most Anglo-Saxon cemeteries are unrepresentative of the whole population, and particularly the whole age range. This was, therefore, a community which made decisions about the disposal of the dead based upon various factors, but at those we can barely guess. Was the inclusion of some but not all individuals subject to political control, or cultural screening? Was this a mark of ethnicity or did it represent a particular kinship, real or constructed, or the adherents of a particular cult? Was it status specific, with the rural proletariat – who would have been the vast majority of the population – perhaps excluded? So are many of these cemeteries associated with specific, high-status households and weighted particularly towards adult members? We do not know, but the commitment of particular parts of the community to an imported and in some senses 'Germanic', cremation ritual does seem to have been considerable, and is something which requires explanation."

=== Barrow burials ===
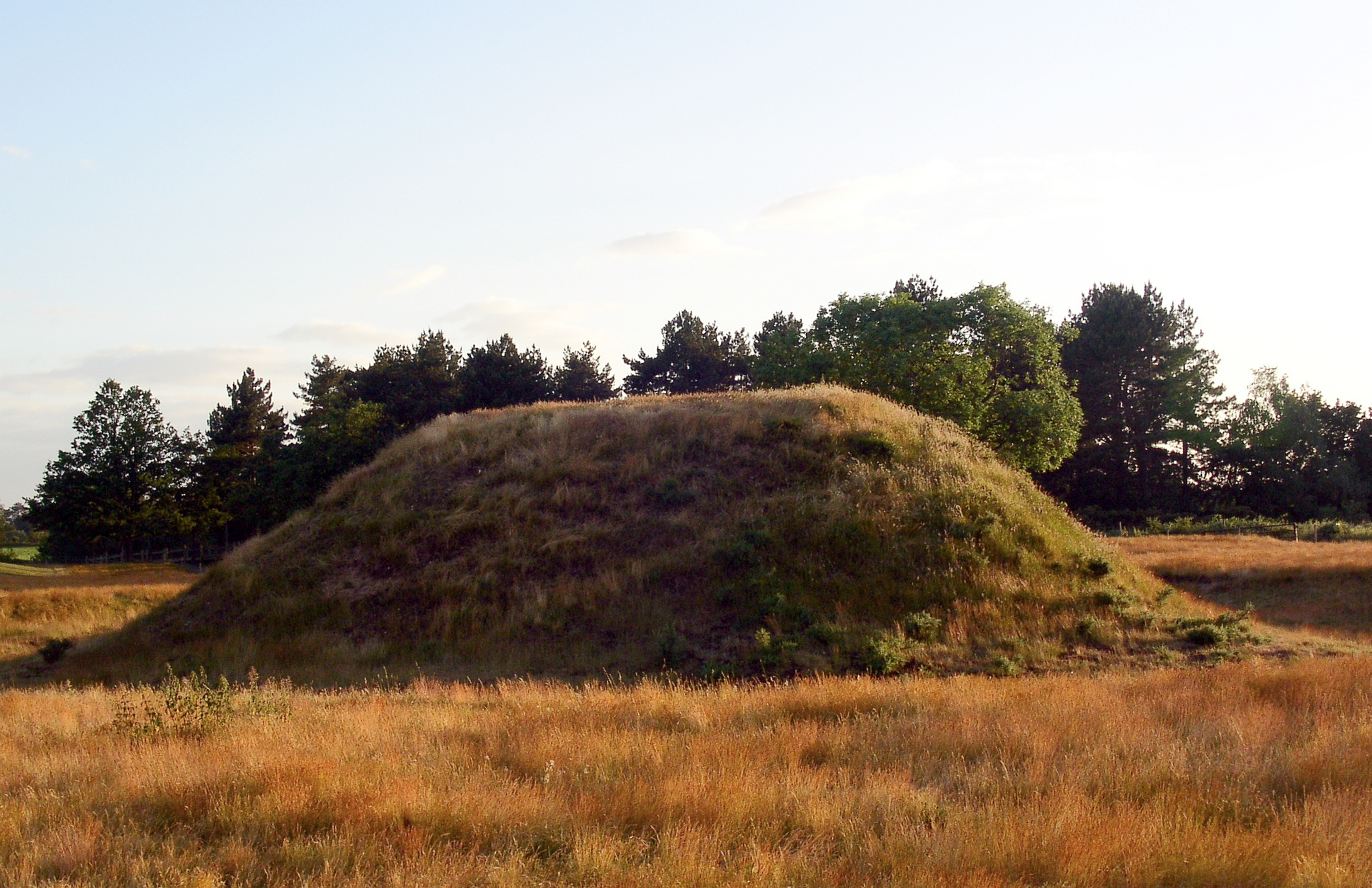
Mound 2 is the only Sutton Hoo tumulus to have been reconstructed to its supposed original height.

In the late sixth century, well over a century after the Anglo-Saxon peoples had become dominant in eastern Britain, they adopted a new burial practice for the deceased members of the wealthy social elite: their burial in tumuli, which are also known as barrows or burial mounds.

This practice had been adopted by the members of the Merovingian dynasty who ruled the Franks in Francia (modern France) during the fifth century. During the sixth century, they had gained increasing influence over the Anglo-Saxon Kingdom of Kent, eventually leading to a marriage alliance between the two. The Kentish elites subsequently adopted the practice of tumuli burial, and from here it spread north of the Thames, being adopted by the elites in other Anglo-Saxon kingdoms. It has also been suggested that some of the Anglo-Saxons may have adopted the practice from native Britons.

Barrow burials continued to be practised by the Anglo-Saxons throughout the seventh century but had effectively died out by the eighth.

=== Ship burials ===
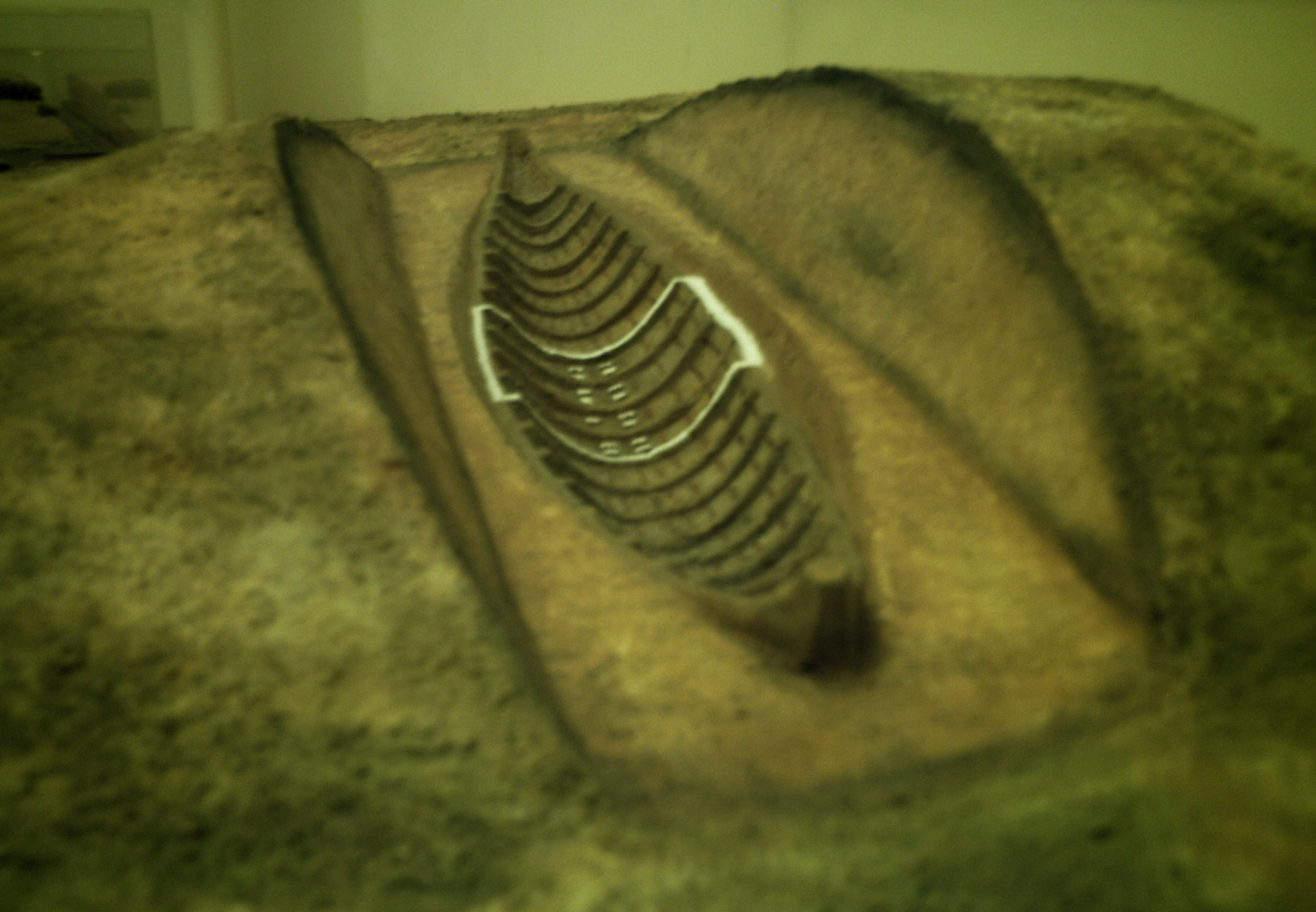
Model of the ship burial at Mound One, Sutton Hoo

Another form of burial was that of ship burials, which were practised by many of the Germanic peoples across northern Europe. In many cases, it seems that the corpse was placed within a ship that was then either sent out to sea or left on land, but in both cases then set alight. In Suffolk however, ships were not burned, but buried, as is the case at Sutton Hoo, which, it is believed, was the resting place of the king of the East Angles, Rædwald. Both ship and tumulus burials were described in the Beowulf poem, through the funerals of Scyld Scefing and Beowulf respectively.

=== Reuse of earlier monuments ===
Barrows had been constructed for burial in Britain during the Neolithic, Bronze Age, Iron Age and Romano-British periods prior to the Anglo-Saxon arrival. In many cases, Anglo-Saxons reused these earlier monuments rather than constructing their own. Ancient monuments, whether mounds or other features, were one of the most important factors determining the placing of the dead in the early Anglo-Saxon landscape: in the 7th and 8th centuries, monument reuse became so widespread that it strongly suggests the deliberate location of burials of the elite next to visible monuments of the pre-Saxon past, but with 'ordinary' burial grounds of this phase also frequently being located next to prehistoric barrows. The relative increase of this kind of spatial association from the 5th/6th centuries to the 7th/8th centuries is conspicuous. Howard Williams' analysis of two well-documented samples shows an increase from 32% to 50% of Anglo-Saxon burial sites in the Upper Thames region, and from 47% to 71% of Anglo-Saxon cemeteries excavated since 1945.

Anglo-Saxon secondary activity on prehistoric and Roman sites was once explained as labour-saving practicality. These explanations, in the view of Howard Williams, failed to account for the numbers and types of monuments and graves (from villas to barrows) reused. Anglo-Saxon reuse of prehistoric barrows, in particular, has been seen as an expression of ancestral claims to the land. Chris Loveluck and Heinrich Härke suggested that this re-use might sometimes reflect a situation where the people being buried really were ancestrally local; Eva Thäte has emphasised the Continental origins of monument reuse in post-Roman England; and Howard Williams has suggested that the main purpose of monument-reuse was to give meaning to a landscape that Anglo-Saxon immigrants did not find empty.

The principal study of Anglo-Saxons' monument reuse is by Sarah Semple.

== Grave goods ==
Both pagan and Christian Anglo-Saxons buried their dead with grave goods. Amongst the earlier Anglo-Saxons who adhered to pagan beliefs, such goods accompanied both inhumed and cremated remains.

In some cases, animal skulls, particularly oxen but also a pig, were buried in human graves, a practice also found in Roman Britain.

Howard Williams argued that grave goods carried mnemonic significance in Early Medieval society. Williams has also explored the significance of death, cremation and grooming implements.

Grave goods can inform archaeologists about cultural connections and trade; for instance, at Buckland Cemetery near Dover, Kent, over half of the brooches buried as grave goods were imports from continental Europe, illustrating the connections between the Kingdom of Kent and the Frankish area.

== Middle Anglo-Saxon period ==
The Middle Anglo-Saxon period is a term applied to the years between circa 600 and 800 CE. The burial practices of this period have been described as being less well understood than those of either the Early or Late Anglo-Saxon period. The first individual to recognise a cemetery as having dated from this period was the late 18th century antiquarian James Douglas; in examining the grave goods found in Kentish barrow cemeteries, he noted the presence of Christian motifs on certain artifacts, thereby concluding that this cemetery contained the burials of those Anglo-Saxons who had converted to Christianity but who lived before the emergence of widespread churchyard burial. Further Middle Anglo-Saxon cemeteries were identified by the archaeologist T. C. Lethbridge in Cambridgeshire during the 1920s and 1930s, who noted that they lacked the 'pagan' elements, such as weapon burials, which were associated with earlier cemeteries; he thus assumed that those inhumed at the site were early Anglo-Saxon Christians.

The archaeologist Helen Geake noted that the burials of this period could be analytically divided into four groups: furnished, unfurnished, princely, and deviant. Some cemeteries contain only one form of burial, but others combine different forms; the prominent Middle Anglo-Saxon cemetery at Sutton Hoo in Suffolk for instance contained three types of burial.

The documented conversion of Anglo-Saxon England to Christianity, which took place during the seventh century, was used by earlier archaeologists to explain many of the changes in burial practices during this period. For instance, the gradual decline in the appearance of grave goods and the increasing use of inhumed bodies located in a west-to-east orientation have been attributed to Christian beliefs about the afterlife.

=== Final Phase burials ===
"[T]he model may be synthesized into three major components. Firstly, suppression: burial with grave-goods was gradually squeezed out. Secondly, separation: the Final Phase burial grounds are a discrete group of cemeteries. Thirdly, succession: the cemeteries replace a nearby predecessor. For these three components of the model the causation, the motivating force for change, is Christianity."

— Andy Boddington, 1990.

Cemeteries of this period have sometimes been referred to as "Final Phase", a term coined for them by the archaeologist Edward Thurlow Leeds in 1936. He viewed such cemeteries as the last manifestation of the pagan way of life before it was supplanted by Christianity with its unfurnished burial practices. In 1963, the archaeologist Miranda Hyslop analyzed the excavated burials up to that date and assembled a list of attributes that she believed defined Final Phase burials. The furnished burials of the "Final Phase" are typical of 7th and early-8th century cemeteries. However, the manner in which archaeologists have assigned burials as "Final Phase" has been uneven, and thus there is no clear corpus of agreed-upon examples.

Boddington summarised the characteristics of Final Phase burials as a series of eight points. First, it involved a new set of cemeteries being established under the influence of Christianity. Second, these cemeteries were often located close to settlements, in contrast to their Early Anglo-Saxon counterparts. Third, the burials are almost entirely inhumations, with very few cremation burials having been found from this period. Fourth, these inhumations tend to be oriented on a west-to-east direction. Fifth, some of the graves are located in, or under, barrows. Sixth, there is a high proportion of graves with few or no grave goods. Seventh, those items that are featured are predominantly relating to utilitarian clothing or represent small personal tokens. The final point is that some of the grave goods, notable the cross forms, have Christian symbolic significance.

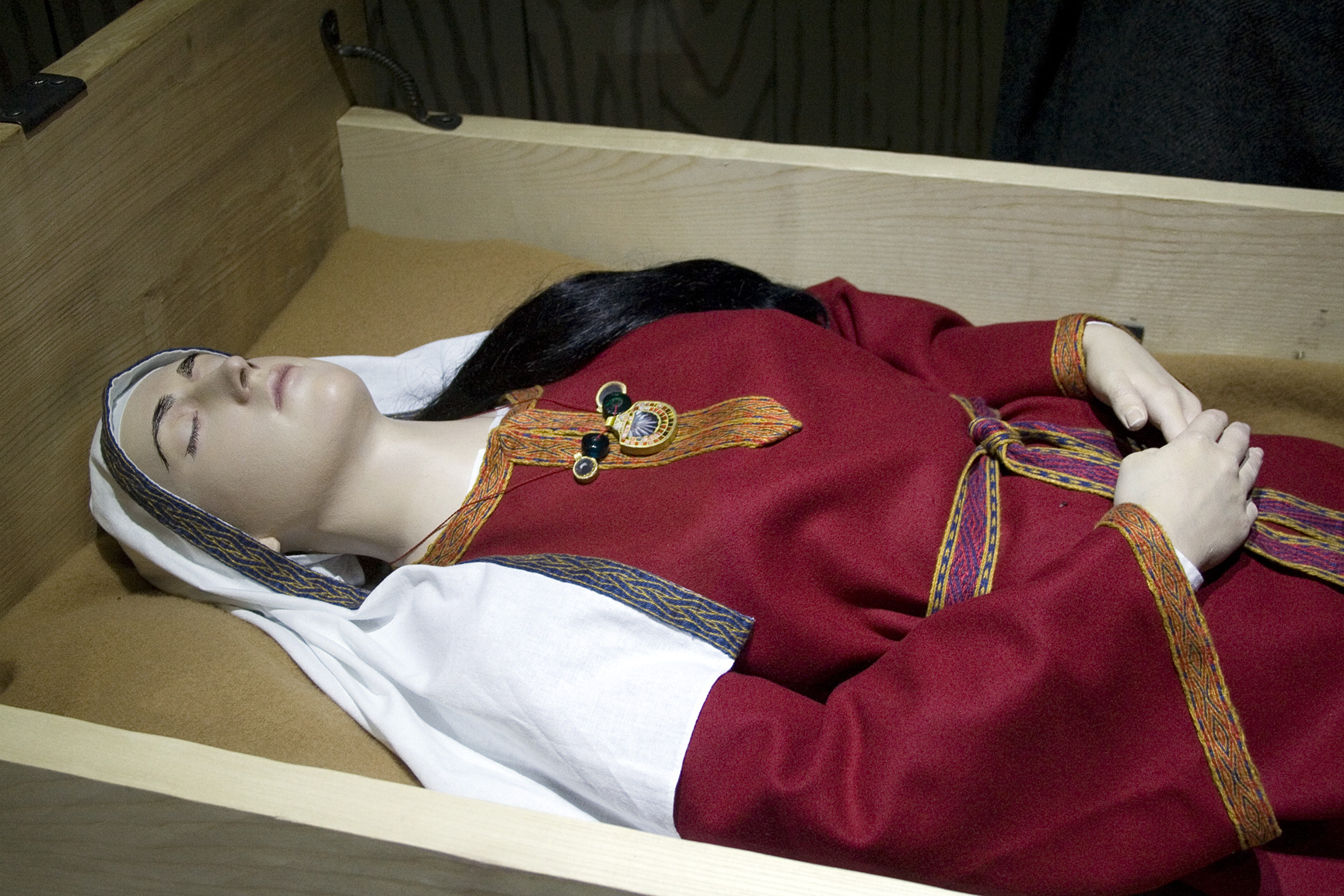
Replica of the "Saxon Princess" bed burial at the Street House Anglo-Saxon cemetery

In addition, Geake noted that the bodies are generally supine, being either extended or slightly flexed, while the arms are typically at the sides of the body or folded across it. There is nevertheless variation in the use of structures within and around the graves, which include beds or chambers inside the grave, as well as mounds, potholes, or boat parts outside of it.

Burials reflecting this Final Phase exhibit an increasing polarity of grave wealth. While most Final Phase burials contain grave goods, there are fewer artifacts interred with the graves than was seen in the Early Anglo-Saxon period. The artifacts included as grave goods also differ from those typically found in earlier centuries. Brooches and long strings of beads become less common in female graves, while weapons become less common in male graves. Men's graves often include small buckles, knives, and sometimes shoelace tags. Women's graves typically consist of pins, chatelaines with such accessories as purse-mounts and workboxes, and necklaces containing small, monochrome beads, gold pendants, and slip-rings made of silver or bronze.

The decline in grave goods has sometimes been attributed to the suppression of this practice by the ecclesiastical Christian authorities. However this explanation has often been challenged, in part, because there are no surviving canons or laws from this period that condemn the practice of burying the dead with grave goods; rather, contemporary ecclesiastical documents display little interest in how the dead are buried. Moreover, there is no clear termination of the use of grave goods but rather a gradual decline in the practice, whereas any ecclesiastical prohibition might have been expected to result in an immediate end to the practice. An alternative explanation for the decline in grave goods is that the Middle Anglo-Saxon period could have witnessed a change in the structure of inheritance; for instance, whereas weapons were previously inhumed along with their owner, there could have been an increasing emphasis on such items being inherited by the deceased's kin. A third explanation could be found in a growing desire to conserve limited resources and keep them within the circulation, rather than removing them from social usage through burial with the dead. This could in turn be linked to the expansion of trade systems and the establishment of trading sites such as Ipswich at which items could be more easily exchanged.

The spatial patterning of grave good types also differs from those of the Early Anglo-Saxon period, as smaller regional distributions were replaced by larger ones. This might reflect that the people of Anglo-Saxon England were beginning to increasingly recognize themselves as members of a larger cultural group, the English, as opposed to their earlier more geographically restricted cultural groupings.

=== Elite/Rich Burials ===
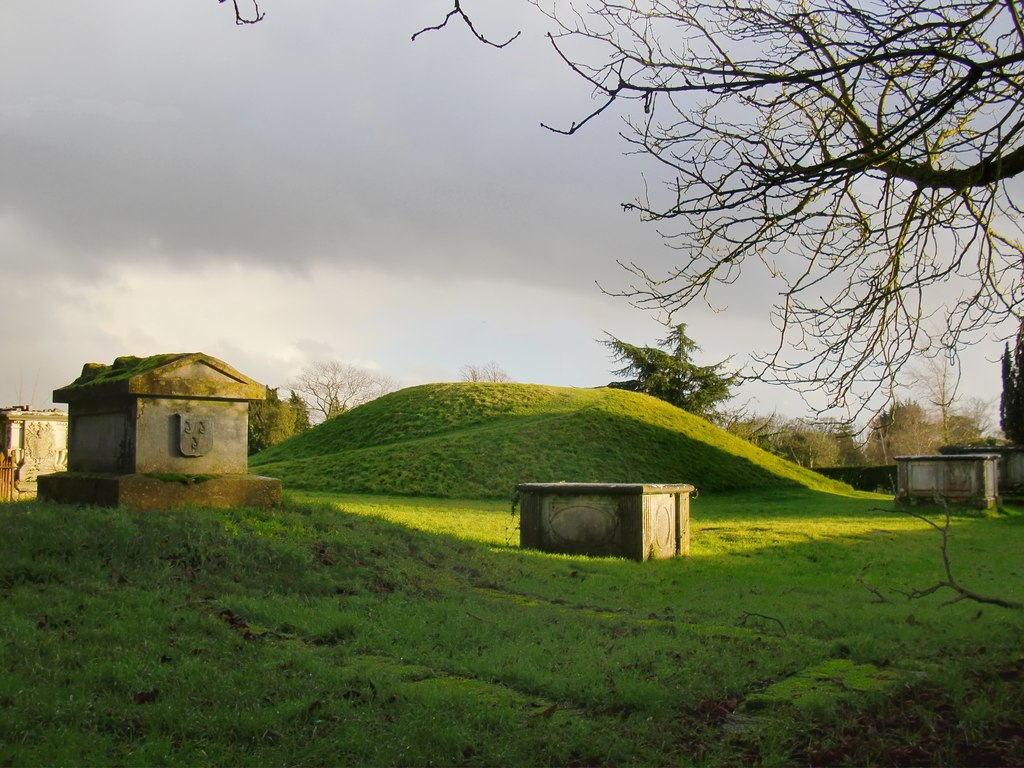
The Taplow burial mound, an example of a highly furnished "Final Phase" burial

A different form of burial found in Middle Anglo-Saxon England is termed the "Rich Burial" or "Princely Burial" by archaeologists. These are characterized by having a large number and high quality of their grave goods and are often also found beneath a barrow mound or tumulus. However, there is no precise agreed-upon definition among Anglo-Saxonist archaeologists regarding the criteria for characterizing a burial as a 'princely' burial or not. In various respects – such as the orientation and position of the inhumed body and the variety of structures within or around the grave – these princely burials are similar to the wider array of contemporary Final Phase furnished burials.

Most famous are the early seventh-century male burials, likely portraying projections of kingly power and status. Of these Sutton Hoo is the most famous, although the ship burial at Snape and the so-called 'Prittlewell Prince' are further important examples. Later in the seventh century, we see a movement away from male examples to a number of lavish female burials. These include Swallowcliffe Down and Westfield Farm (Ely).

=== Unfurnished burials ===
A number of cemeteries dating from the seventh and eighth centuries contain a majority of unfurnished burials. The bodies within these inhumations are often laid out supine in a roughly east to west alignment. Such burials have been found in both rural contexts, as at Burrow Hill, Burgh Castle, and Nazeing, as well as in urban contexts such as Staple Green, Winchester and Castle Green, Hereford.

The practice of unfurnished burial might have been adopted from other areas of the British Isles who already had such traditions in place, such as Ireland or Northumbria.

=== Deviant burials and execution cemeteries ===
These burials typically have either very few or no grave goods. In some instances, for instance at Sutton Hoo and Cuddeston, these burials have been made around a barrow.

== Late Anglo-Saxon period ==
"A man may bury his brother with the dead
And strew his grave with the golden things
He would have him take, treasures of all kinds,
But gold hoarded when he here lived
Cannot allay the anger of God
Toward a soul sin-freighted."

— A passage in Old English poem The Seafarer reflecting Late Anglo-Saxon views on earlier furnished burial.

In nearby Francia, Charlemagne's ordinances of parish rights – issued in 786 and 810/3 – prohibited the continuing use of earlier, non-Christian cemeteries, emphasizing the need for churchyard burial. This formal ruling may have confirmed attitudes that were already held by the Anglo-Saxon Church.

The archaeologist Andy Boddington stated that the transition from the highly furnished graves of the Early Anglo-Saxon period to their unfurnished counterparts on the Late Anglo-Saxon period represented "one of the most dramatic archaeological statements" of the early medieval.

After 900, a churchyard consecration rite was developed. The burial of an individual in the parish to which they belonged was considered mandatory. The only individuals excluded from burial in the churchyard were unrepentant perjurers and those who had committed suicide yet were not deemed mad. The enclosure of churchyards was a development of the tenth and eleventh centuries. Clergy increasingly developed a financial interest in having individuals buried within their churchyard, because they would receive a fee for both the burial and masses to be performed for the dead.

Christian teaching held as a basic tenet the belief that after bodily death the human soul would be judged according to their behavior in life. Those who had been baptized kept faith performed good deeds, and had intercessory prayer could be permitted to Heaven, while those who did not do such things would go on an afterlife of torment in Hell. Texts from this period reflect that there was a division of opinion about the clergy as to whether judgment followed immediately on from death or whether all deceased souls awaited Judgement Day before being sent to either Heaven or Hell. The concept of Purgatory, an intermediate zone between Heaven and Hell, had yet to be developed.

By the eighth century, burial in clothing had largely disappeared, with the exception of clerics. Instead, the majority were buried in a white shroud that was wrapped around the body, in this manner emulating the description of the burial of Jesus Christ in the Gospels.

The use of coffins was practical when a body had to be transported some distance prior to its burial. Typically made of wood, in a number of excavated cases – for instance at York Minster – they also included metal fittings and locks. These wooden coffins rarely survive in the archaeological record, however, a number of examples were preserved due to waterlogged conditions at Barton-upon-Humber. In a minority of cases, coffins were made not of wood but of lead or stone, the latter being used in particular for important clerics.

=== Graveyards ===
The orderly burial of inhumations oriented in a west to east direction with no intercutting was the normal pattern for graveyard burial.

=== Grave markers ===
A tradition emerged of marking important graves, particularly ecclesiastical ones. Such markers included slabs that laid flat over the grave, and large crosses that stood upright, a number of which still survive in place. Surviving marker stones have shown that a number of regional styles existed. In Eastern England, a Scandinavian artistic influence is apparent on many of them.

In the areas of Scandinavian settlement in the northeast of England, hogback tombs were created. The Scandinavian settlement also resulted in the return of furnished burials under barrows in several instances, for instance at Ingleby in Derbyshire.

=== Saints' burials ===
Bede offers a description of the burial of St Cuthbert. This account has been described as being "an extreme case" but not "untypical of those considered sanctified".

== Discovery and excavation ==
=== Antiquarian investigation ===
The earliest record of post-Anglo-Saxon people excavating an early Anglo-Saxon burial comes from the 12th century, when Roger of Wendover described how several monks dug up the burial mounds at Redbourne, Hertfordshire, in search of the bones of Saint Amphibalus, a Roman period priest. A later documented case occurred in the 17th century when Sir Thomas Browne published a pamphlet entitled Hydrotaphia, Urn Burial (1658), in which he described a number of cremation urns found in Norfolk; although they had been Anglo-Saxon in origin, he mistook them for being Romano-British. Describing these finds, Browne related that "In a Field of old Walsingham not many months past were dug up between forty and fifty urns, deposited in a dry and sandy soil, not a yard deep, not far from one another... some containing two pounds of bones, distinguishable in skulls, ribs, jaws, thigh-bones, and teeth, with fresh impressions of their combustion".

Despite these earlier excavations, archaeologist Sam Lucy remarked that "the accolade of being the first excavators of Anglo-Saxon cemeteries should really go to two Kentish gentlemen clerics." The first was the antiquarian Reverend Bryan Faussett. Between 1759 and 1773 he excavated at a number of cemeteries in Kent; Gilton, Kingstone Down, Chartham Down, and Sibertswold. Uncovering about 750 graves, he made detailed records in his field notebooks noting anatomical details, but like Browne before him, he mistakenly attributed them to Roman-Britain. Following his death in 1776, Faussett's notes were written up and published in 1856 as the Inventorium Sepulchrale by Charles Roach Smith, who added his own commentary to the work.

The second of these antiquarian Kentish clerics was James Douglas, who excavated at such sites as Chatham Lines and Greenwich Park from 1779 to 1793. He published his findings in a book entitled Nenia Britannica (1793). Douglas was the first to identify burials of this type as being Anglo-Saxon rather than Romano-British, coming to this conclusion because of "Their situation near villages of [Anglo-]Saxon names" and the fact that "They are scattered all over Britain in places which the [Anglo-]Saxons occupied, and are not discovered in the parts of Wales which they had not subdued."

=== Archaeological investigation ===
Although some antiquarians had made attempts to excavate and catalog the Anglo-Saxon grave-sites, on the whole, such sites were commonly damaged and destroyed in eighteenth and early nineteenth-century England, with a little attempt being made to properly study them. Due to the Society of Antiquaries' inability to act on the situation, in 1843 Charles Roach Smith and Thomas Wright – both keen Anglo-Saxonists – founded the British Archaeological Association (BAA), which held its first conference the following year in Canterbury. The BAA's leadership campaigned for better rights for native British archaeology, asking for it to be protected legally and to be recognized by major institutions. When the British Museum refused to purchase Faussett's collection of Anglo-Saxon artifacts following his grandson's death in 1853, Roach Smith complained that "not only does the Government begin with gathering the monuments, ancient and modern, of all foreign countries, but it ends there also. Our national antiquities are not even made subservient and placed in the lowest grade; they are altogether unrecognized and ignored."

In September 2020, archaeologists announced the discovery of an Anglo-Saxon cemetery with 17 cremations and 191 burials dating back to the 7th century in Oulton, near Lowestoft. The graves contained the remains of men, women, and children, as well as artifacts including small iron knives and silver pennies, wrist clasps, strings of amber, and glass beads. According to Andrew Peachey, who carried out the excavations, the skeletons had mostly vanished because of the highly acidic soil. They were preserved as brittle shapes and "sand silhouettes" in the sand.

In January 2026, archaeologists announced the uncovering of an Anglo-Saxon burial ground during preparatory excavations. The site, dating from the 6th to 7th centuries, includes at least 11 burial mounds (barrows) with both inhumation and cremation burials, many accompanied by weapons, jewelry and vessels, indicating varied funerary practices. Among the most remarkable finds is a high-status burial containing two individuals interred with a fully harnessed horse, weapons and personal items, interpreted as reflecting elite social status.

== See also ==
- Bed burial
- Eaves-drip burial
- List of Anglo-Saxon bed burials
- List of Anglo-Saxon cemeteries
- Prittlewell royal Anglo-Saxon burial
- Norse funeral
