= Funerary archaeology =

Branch of archaeology

Funerary archaeology (or burial archaeology) is a branch of archaeology that studies the treatment and commemoration of the dead. It includes the study of human remains, their burial contexts, and from single grave goods through to monumental landscapes. Funerary archaeology might be considered a sub-set of the study of religion and belief. A wide range of expert areas contribute to funerary archaeology, including epigraphy, material culture studies, thanatology, human osteology, zooarchaeology and stable isotope analysis.

== Laws ==
Funerary archaeology within the United States is also connected with the legal system after the implication of the Native American Graves Protection and Repatriation Act (NAGPRA) established in 1990. The act set requirements that any facility, museum, or repository receiving federal funds must declare and return any human remains or funerary artifacts to a federally recognized tribe if cultural affiliation can be declared between the tribe and the artifacts in the facilities possession. In order to determine if a tribe or descendant has cultural affiliation there are nine avenues to examine: geographical, kinship, biological, archaeological, anthropological, linguistic, folklore, oral tradition, and historial. If affiliation can be determined and the tribe is federally recognized, the remains or funerary artifacts can be repatriated.

Involving Indigenous communities in the repatriation process and recognizing their knowledge and expertise in understanding their own cultural heritage is essential. Archaeologists and Indigenous people can get a more thorough knowledge of the remains and foster cultural understanding and appreciation by working together in a respectful and collaborative manner. Cal-NAGPRA is a policy that can achieve this. For example, Hopi tribe has provided important contextual information about the use of natural resources and the significance of particular sites, which has helped archaeologists to interpret the data more accurately.

== Bibliography ==
- Parker Pearson, M. (1999) The Archaeology of Death and Burial. Stroud: Sutton.
- Tarlow, S. and Nilsson Stutz, L. eds. (2013). The Oxford Handbook of Death and Burial. Oxford: Oxford University Press.
