= Archaeology of Anglo-Saxon England =

The archaeology of Anglo-Saxon England is the study of the archaeology of England from the 5th century AD to the 11th century, when it was ruled by Germanic tribes known collectively as the Anglo-Saxons.

== History and overview ==
The Anglo-Saxon period is broadly defined as the period of time from roughly 410 AD to 1066 AD. The first modern, systemic excavations of Anglo-Saxon cemeteries and settlements began in the 1920s. Since then, archaeological surveys of cemeteries and settlements have uncovered more information about the society and culture of Anglo-Saxon England.

Reverend James Douglas was the first antiquarian to recognize Anglo-Saxon burials for what they were, and he described his findings in Nenia Britannica (1793). Interest in Anglo-Saxon materials increased in the 19th century, with scholars like the archaeologist Thomas Bateman and the architect Thomas Rickman producing some of the earliest authoritative texts on the subject.

== Architecture ==
Anglo-Saxon architecture is characterized by rectangular, timber buildings such as houses and halls. The construction of stone defenses and monuments became more common in the late 10th and 11th century AD, but urban buildings continued to be made of timber.

== Art and jewelry ==
Anglo-Saxon art is best known for its examples of sophisticated metalwork and jewelry, as well as carvings and illuminated manuscripts. Anglo-Saxon art was influenced by Germanic art and Celtic art. Interactions with cultures from regions like the Mediterranean and early Christian Ireland also influenced Anglo-Saxon arts.

In December 2019, Roman and Anglo-Saxon artifacts, including pottery, jugs, and jewelry, were unearthed from burial grounds by archaeologists led by Nigel Page at Baginton. The team of researchers believed that two of the graves belonged to a "high-status" rank officer and a Roman girl aged 6–12 years old. Findings from the Roman cremation burial site of a young girl included four brooches, a ring with an image of a cicada and a hair pin.

In August 2021, archaeologists headed by Gabor Thomas from the University of Reading announced the discovery of a monastery dated back to the reign of Queen Cynethryth in the grounds of Holy Trinity Church in the village of Cookham in Berkshire. They also found items including food remains, pottery vessels used for cooking and eating, a fine bronze bracelet and a dress pin.

== Burial ==
One of the most well-known aspects of early Anglo-Saxon society is their burial customs. Archaeological excavations at various sites include Sutton Hoo, Spong Hill, Prittlewell, Snape and Walkington Wold. Around 1200 Anglo-Saxon pagan cemeteries have been discovered. There was no set form of burial amongst the pagan Anglo-Saxons, with cremation being preferred amongst the Angles in the north and inhumation amongst the Saxons in the south, although both forms were found throughout England, sometimes in the same cemeteries. When cremation did take place, the ashes were usually placed within an urn and then buried, sometimes along with grave goods. Free Anglo-Saxon men were buried with at least one weapon in the pagan tradition, often a seax, but sometimes also with a spear, sword or shield, or a combination of these. Wealthy individuals were buried with rich grave goods. There are also various recorded cases of animal skulls, particularly oxen but also pig, being buried in human graves, a practice that was also found in earlier Roman Britain.

The earliest Anglo-Saxon identifiable cemeteries appear in the early fifth century, scattered over several regions, with Kent as an outlier owing to notably dense settlement or perhaps an earlier and more sustained occupation. By the late fifth century, more cemeteries emerge — including along the Sussex coast—and some, such as Spong Hill, suggest Germanic-speaking arrivals may predate AD 450. Around ten thousand such cremations and inhumations are now known, revealing great diversity in burial styles and mortuary practice, pointing to many localized micro-cultures. Physical finds—including brooches unique to southern Britain (known as Quoits) - show culture was not merely transplanted from the Continent: from the start, new “Anglo-Saxon” identities were forming. Some sites yield large numbers of Frankish artefacts, especially in Kent, generally interpreted as evidence of significant trade; similarly, Scandinavian elements in coastal cemeteries of East Anglia may date to around the later fifth century.

Skeletal analysis offers insights into how incomers and natives mixed. In some cemeteries, average male stature declines noticeably from the sixth to the eighth century, suggesting ongoing intermarriage with local Britons. The Stretton-on-Fosse II cemetery suggests that intermarriage with Romano-British women was common in some locations. Evidence for reuse of older Roman or prehistoric monuments raises the question of how such cemeteries may have drawn on preexisting identities—either genuinely inherited or claimed—and underscores the complexity of early Anglo-Saxon society, in which ethnic boundaries and burial practices often blurred.

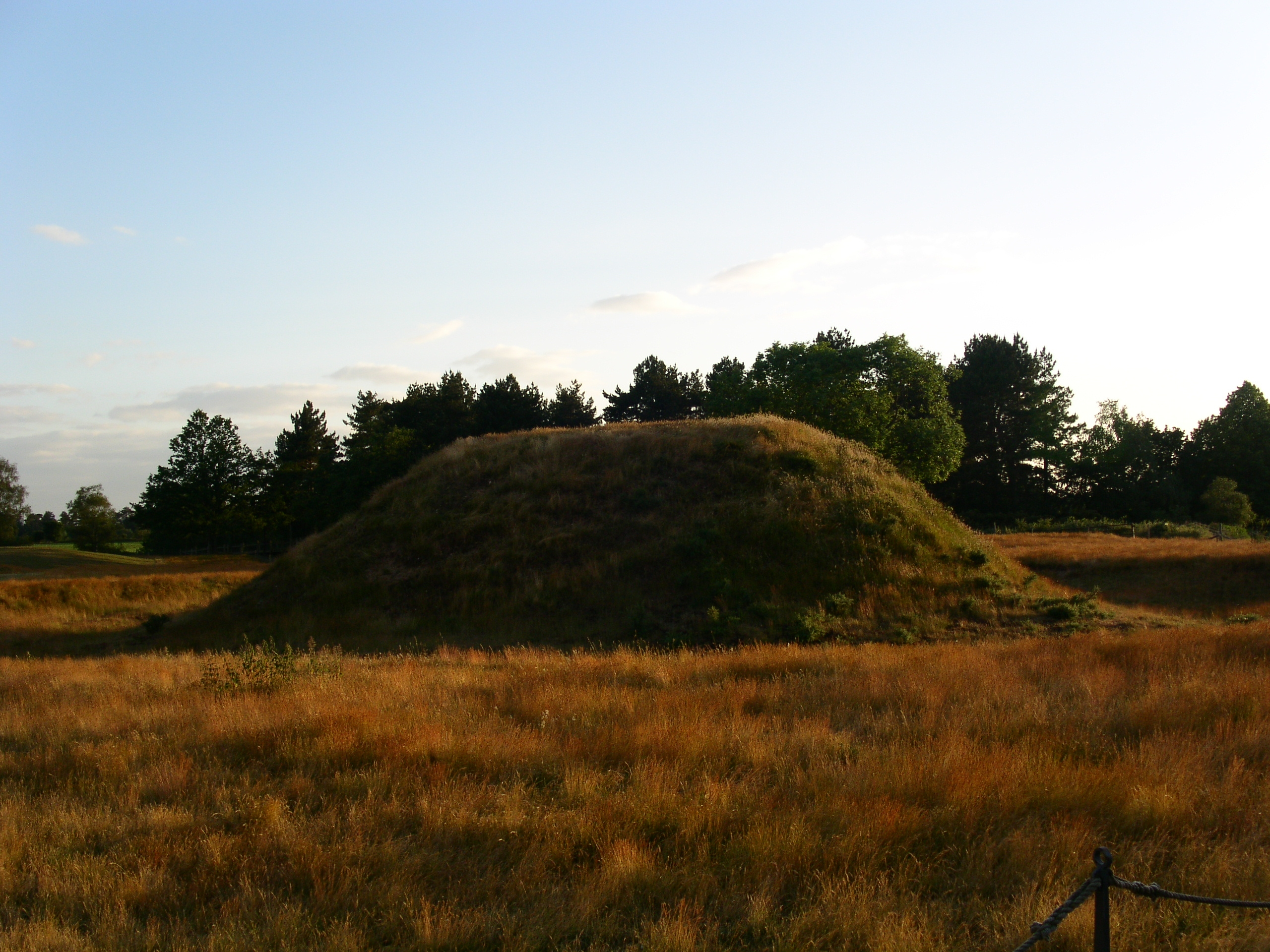
One of the tumulus burial mounds at Sutton Hoo

Eventually, in the 6th and 7th centuries, burial mounds began to appear in Anglo-Saxon England, and in certain cases earlier burial mounds from the Neolithic, Bronze Age, Iron Age and Romano-British periods were simply reused by the Anglo-Saxons. It is not known why they adopted this practice, but it may be from the practices of the native Britons. Burial mounds remained objects of veneration in early Anglo-Saxon Christianity, and numerous churches were built next to tumuli. Another form of burial was that of ship burials, which were practised by many of the Germanic peoples across northern Europe. In many cases it seems that the corpse was placed within a ship which was then either sent out to sea or left on land, but in both cases then set alight. In Suffolk however, ships were not burned, but buried, as is the case at Sutton Hoo, which is believed to have been the resting place of the king of the East Angles, Rædwald. Both ship and tumulus burials were described in the Beowulf poem, through the funerals of Scyld Scefing and Beowulf respectively.

There are also many cases where corpses have been found decapitated, for instance, at a mass grave in Thetford, Norfolk, fifty beheaded individuals were discovered, their heads possibly having been taken as trophies of war. In other cases of decapitation it seems possible that it was evidence of human sacrifice or execution.

In September 2020, archaeologists announced the discovery of a Sutton Hoo-era Anglo-Saxon cemetery with 17 cremations and 191 burials dating back to the 7th century in Oulton, near Lowestoft. The graves contained the remains of men, women and children, as well as artefacts including small iron knives and silver pennies, wrist clasps, strings of amber and glass beads. According to Andrew Peachey, who carried out the excavations, the skeletons had mostly vanished because of the highly acidic soil. They were preserved as brittle shapes and “sand silhouettes” in the sand.

In September 2021, archaeologists from LP-Archaeology led by Rachel Wood, have announced discovery of remains of St. Mary's Old Church which dates back to 1080 in Stoke Mandeville. They unearthed flint walls forming a square structure, enclosed by a circular borderline and burials while working on the route of the HS2 high-speed railway.

In January 2026, archaeologists announced the uncovering of an Anglo-Saxon burial ground during preparatory excavations. The site, dating from the 6th to 7th centuries, includes at least 11 burial mounds (barrows) with both inhumation and cremation burials, many accompanied by weapons, jewelry and vessels, indicating varied funerary practices. Among the most remarkable finds is a high-status burial containing two individuals interred with a fully harnessed horse, weapons and personal items, interpreted as reflecting elite social status.

== Landscape archaeology ==
The Anglo-Saxons did not settle in an abandoned landscape on which they imposed new types of settlement and farming, as was once believed. By the late 4th century the English rural landscape was largely cleared and generally occupied by dispersed farms and hamlets, each surrounded by its own fields but often sharing other resources in common (called "infield-outfield cultivation"). Such fields, whether of prehistoric or Roman origin, fall into two very general types, found both separately and together: irregular layouts, in which one field after another had been added to an arable hub over many centuries; and regular rectilinear layouts, often roughly following the local topography, that had resulted from the large-scale division of considerable areas of land. Such stability was reversed within a few decades of the 5th century, as early "Anglo-Saxon" farmers, affected both by the collapse of Roman Britain and a climatic deterioration which reached its peak probably around 500, concentrated on subsistence, converting to pasture large areas of previously ploughed land. However, there is little evidence of abandoned arable land.

Evidence across southern and central England increasingly shows the persistence of prehistoric and Roman field layouts into and, in some cases throughout, the Anglo-Saxon period, whether or not such fields were continuously ploughed. Landscapes at Yarnton, Oxfordshire, and Mucking, Essex, remained unchanged throughout the 5th century, while at Barton Court, Oxfordshire, the 'grid of ditched paddocks or closes' of a Roman villa estate formed a general framework for the Anglo-Saxon settlement there. Similar evidence has been found at Sutton Courtenay, Berkshire. The Romano-British fields at Church Down in Chalton and Catherington, both in Hampshire, Bow Brickhill, Buckinghamshire, and Havering, Essex, were all ploughed as late as the 7th century.

Susan Oosthuizen has taken this further and establishes evidence that aspects of the "collective organisation of arable cultivation appear to find an echo in fields of pre-historic and Roman Britain": in particular, the open field systems, shared between a number of cultivators but cropped individually; the link between arable holdings and rights to common pasture land; in structures of governance and the duty to pay some of the surplus to the local overlord, whether in rent or duty. Together these reveal that kinship ties and social relations were continuous across the 5th and 6th centuries, with no evidence of the uniformity or destruction, imposed by lords, the savage action of invaders or system collapse. This has implications on how later developments are considered, such as the developments in the 7th and 8th centuries.

Landscape studies draw upon a variety of topographical, archaeological and written sources. There are major problems in trying to relate Anglo-Saxon charter boundaries to those of Roman estates for which there are no written records, and by the end of the Anglo-Saxon period there had been major changes to the organisation of the landscape which can obscure earlier arrangements. Interpretation is also hindered by uncertainty about late Roman administrative arrangements. Nevertheless, studies carried out throughout the country, in "British" as well as "Anglo-Saxon" areas, have found examples of continuity of territorial boundaries where, for instance, Roman villa estate boundaries seem to have been identical with those of medieval estates, as delineated in early charters, though settlement sites within the defined territory might shift. What we see in these examples is probably continuity of the estate or territory as a unit of administration rather than one of exploitation. Although the upper level of Roman administration based on towns seems to have disappeared during the 5th century, a subsidiary system based on subdivisions of the countryside may have continued.

The basis of the internal organisation of both the Anglo-Saxon kingdoms and those of their Celtic neighbours was a large rural territory which contained a number of subsidiary settlements dependent upon a central residence which the Anglo-Saxons called a villa in Latin and a tūn in Old English. These developments suggest that the basic infrastructure of the early Anglo-Saxon local administration (or the settlement of early kings or earls) was inherited from late Roman or Sub-Roman Britain.

== The Archaeology of the Anglo-Saxon Settlement of England ==
An Anglo-Frisian funerary urn excavated from the Snape ship burial in East Anglia. Item is located in Aldeburgh Moot Hall Museum.

Archaeologists seeking to understand evidence for migration and/or acculturation in the Anglo-Saxon settlement of Britain must first get to grips with early Anglo-Saxon archaeology as an "Archaeology of Identity". Guarding against considering one aspect of archaeology in isolation, this concept ensures that different topics are considered together, that previously were considered separately, including gender, age, ethnicity, religion, and status.

=== Understanding the Roman legacy ===
Archaeological evidence for the emergence of both a native British identity and the appearance of a Germanic culture in Britain in the 5th and 6th centuries must consider first the period at the end of Roman rule. The collapse of Roman material culture some time in the early 5th century left a gap in the archaeological record that was quite rapidly filled by the intrusive Anglo-Saxon material culture, while the native culture became archaeologically close to invisible—although recent hoards and metal-detector finds show that coin use and imports did not stop abruptly at AD 410. (Note: Helen Cool investigates late assemblages, in her paper, from the period between the end of the Roman occupation and the Anglo-Saxon period. It lists all assemblages, that were known, at the time of publication of the paper. Simon Esmonde Cleary attempts to characterise and analyse the change in the nature of the archaeological record in England in the mid-first millennium AD.)

The archaeology of the Roman military systems within Britain is well known but is not well understood: for example, whether the Saxon Shore was defensive or to facilitate the passage of goods. Andrew Pearson suggests that the "Saxon Shore Forts" and other coastal installations played a more significant economic and logistical role than is often appreciated, and that the tradition of Saxon and other continental piracy, based on the name of these forts, is probably a myth.

The archaeology of late Roman (and sub-Roman) Britain has been mainly focused on the elite rather than the peasant and slave: their villas, houses, mosaics, furniture, fittings, and silver plates. This group had a strict code on how their wealth was to be displayed, and this provides a rich material culture, from which "Britons" are identified. There was a large gap between richest and poorest; the trappings of the latter have been the focus of less archaeological study. However the archaeology of the peasant from the 4th and 5th centuries is dominated by "ladder" field systems or enclosures, associated with extended families, and in the South and East of England, the extensive use of timber-built buildings and farmsteads shows a lower level of engagement with Roman building methods than is shown by the houses of the numerically much smaller elite.

=== Settler evidence ===
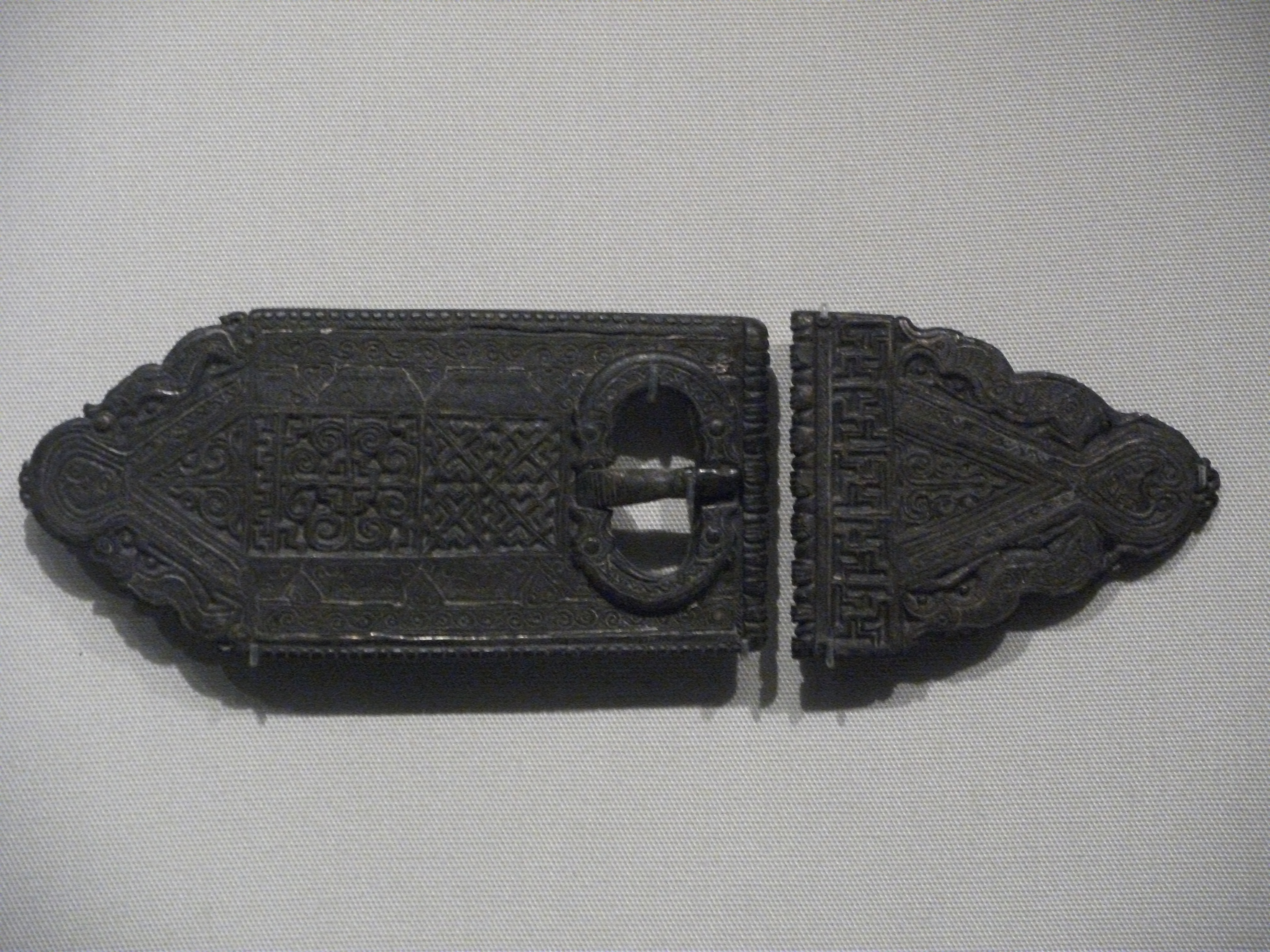
Romano-British or Anglo-Saxon belt fittings in the Quoit Brooch Style from the Mucking Anglo-Saxon cemetery, early 5th century, using a mainly Roman style for very early Anglo-Saxon clients

Confirmation of the use of Anglo-Saxons as foederati or federate troops has been seen as coming from burials of Anglo-Saxons wearing military equipment of a type issued to late Roman forces, which have been found both in late Roman contexts, such as the Roman cemeteries of Winchester and Colchester, and in purely 'Anglo-Saxon' rural cemeteries like Mucking (Essex), though this was at a settlement used by the Romano-British. The distribution of the earliest Anglo-Saxon sites and place names in close proximity to Roman settlements and roads has been interpreted as showing that initial Anglo-Saxon settlements were being controlled by the Romano-British.

Catherine Hills suggests it is not necessary to see all the early settlers as federate troops, and that this interpretation has been used rather too readily by some archaeologists. A variety of relationships could have existed between Romano-British and incoming Anglo-Saxons. The broader archaeological picture suggests that no one model will explain all the Anglo-Saxon settlements in Britain and that there was considerable regional variation. Settlement density varied within southern and eastern England. Norfolk has more large Anglo-Saxon cemeteries than the neighbouring East Anglian county of Suffolk; eastern Yorkshire (the nucleus of the Anglo-Saxon kingdom of Deira) far more than the rest of Northumbria. The settlers were not all of the same type. Some were indeed warriors who were buried equipped with their weapons, but we should not assume that all of these were invited guests who were to guard Romano-British communities. Possibly some, like the later Viking settlers, may have begun as piratical raiders who later seized land and made permanent settlements. Other settlers seem to have been much humbler people who had few if any weapons and suffered from malnutrition. These were characterised by Sonia Chadwick Hawkes as Germanic 'boat people', refugees from crowded settlements on the North Sea which deteriorating climatic conditions would have made untenable.

=== Tribal characteristics ===
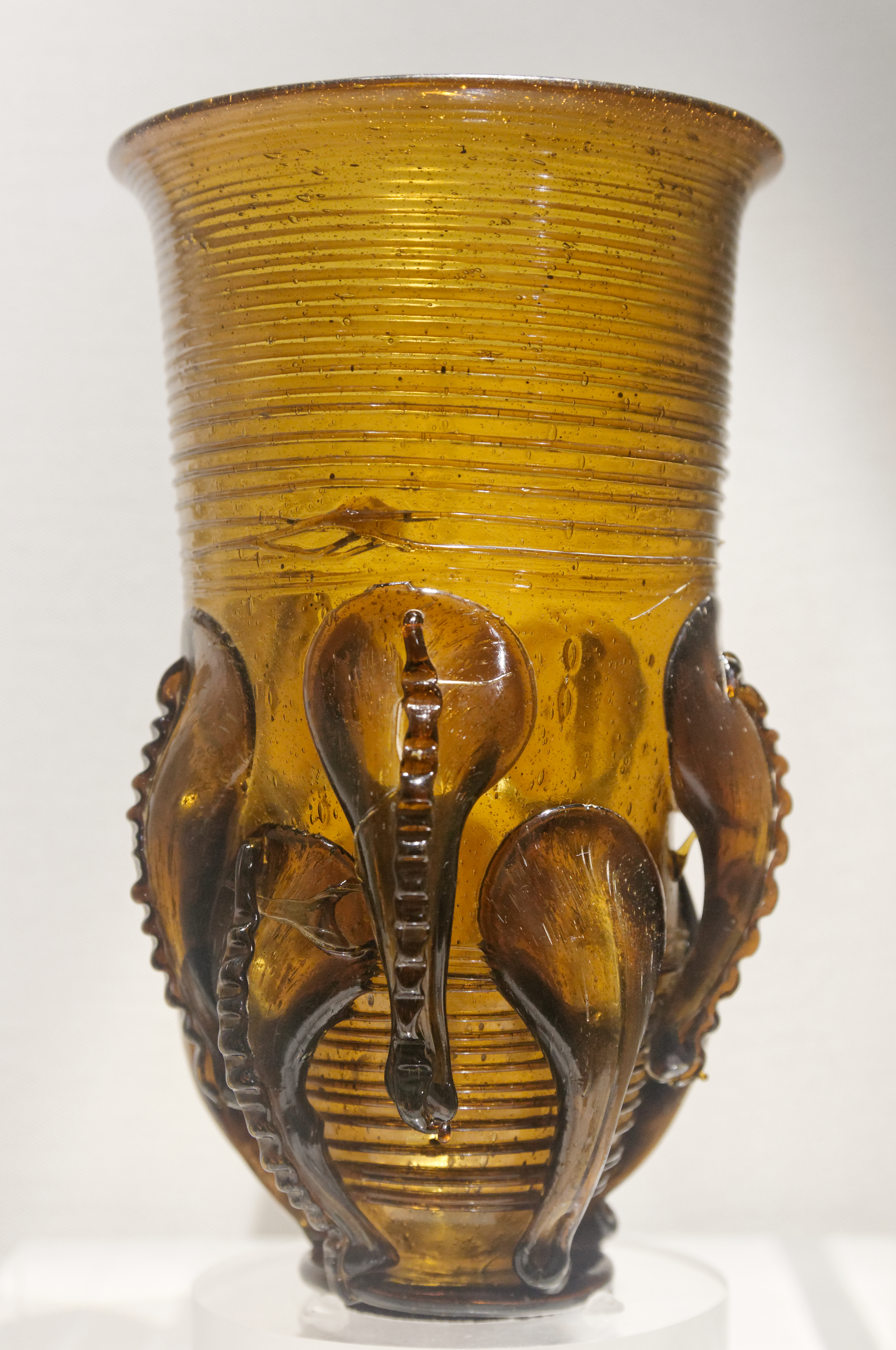
Frankish glass 'claw beaker' 5th–6th century, excavated in Kent

Catherine Hills points out that it is too easy to consider Anglo-Saxon archaeology solely as a study of ethnology and to fail to consider that identity is "less related to an overall Anglo-Saxon ethnicity and more to membership of family or tribe, Christian or pagan, elite or peasant". "Anglo-Saxons" or "Britons" were no more homogeneous than nationalities are today, and they would have exhibited diverse characteristics: male/female, old/young, rich/poor, farmer/warrior—or even Gildas' patria (fellow citizens), cives (indigenous people) and hostes (enemies)—as well as a diversity associated with language. Beyond these, in the early Anglo-Saxon period, identity was local: although people would have known their neighbours, it may have been important to indicate tribal loyalty with details of clothing and especially fasteners. It is sometimes hard in thinking about the period to avoid importing anachronistic 19th-century ideas of nationalism: in fact it is unlikely that people would have thought of themselves as Anglo-Saxon—instead they were part of a tribe or region, descendants of a patron or followers of a leader. It is this identity that archaeological evidence seeks to understand and determine, considering how it might support separate identity groups, or identities that were inter-connected.

Part of a well-furnished pagan-period mixed, inhumation-cremation, cemetery at Alwalton near Peterborough was excavated in 1999. Twenty-eight urned and two unurned cremations dating from between the 5th and 6th centuries, and 34 inhumations, dating from between the late 5th and early 7th centuries, were uncovered. Both cremations and inhumations were provided with pyre or grave goods, and some of the burials were richly furnished. The excavation found evidence for a mixture of practices and symbolic clothing; these reflected local differences that appeared to be associated with tribal or family loyalty. This use of clothing in particular was very symbolic, and distinct differences within groups in the cemetery could be found.

Some recent scholarship has argued, however, that current approaches to the sociology of ethnicity render it extremely difficult, if not impossible, to demonstrate ethnic identity via purely archaeological means, and has thereby rejected the basis for using furnished inhumation or such clothing practices as the use of peplos dress, or particular artistic styles found on artefacts such as those found at Alwalton, for evidence of pagan beliefs, or cultural memories of tribal or ethnic affiliation.

=== Distribution of settlements ===
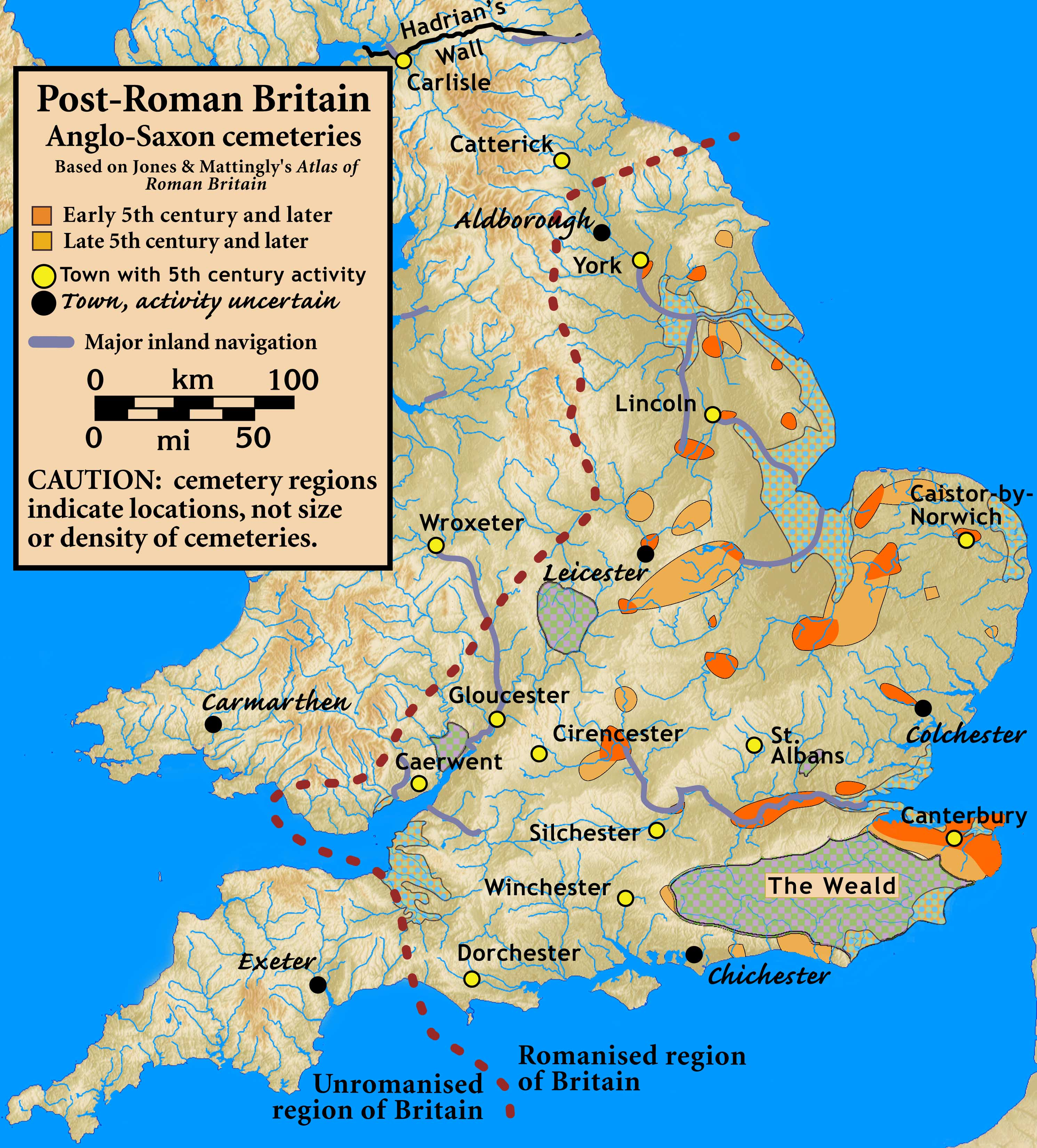
Early cemeteries of possible Settler origin

There are a number of difficulties in recognising early Anglo-Saxon settlements as migrant settlers. This in part is because most early rural Anglo-Saxon sites have yielded few finds other than pottery and bone. The use of aerial photography does not yield easily identifiable settlements, partly due to the dispersed nature of many of these settlements.

The distribution of known settlements also remains elusive with few settlements found in the West Midlands or North-West. Even in Kent, an area of rich early Anglo-Saxon archaeology, the number of excavated settlements is fewer than expected. However, in contrast the counties of Northamptonshire, Oxfordshire, Suffolk and Cambridgeshire are relatively rich in early settlements. These have revealed a tendency for early Anglo-Saxon settlements to be on the light soils associated with river terraces.

Many of the inland settlements are on rivers that had been major navigation routes during the Roman era. These sites, such as Dorchester on Thames on the upper Thames, were readily accessible by the shallow-draught, clinker-built boats used by the Anglo-Saxons. The same is true of the settlements along the rivers Ouse, Trent, Witham, Nene and along the marshy lower Thames. Less well known due to a dearth of physical evidence but attested by surviving place names, there were Jutish settlements on the Isle of Wight and the nearby southern coast of Hampshire.

A number of Anglo-Saxon settlements are located near or at Roman-era towns, but the question of simultaneous town occupation by the Romano-Britons and a nearby Anglo-Saxon settlement (i.e., suggesting a relationship) is not confirmed. At Roman Caistor-by-Norwich, for example, recent analysis suggests that the cemetery post-dates the town's virtual abandonment.

=== Isotope analysis ===
Isotope analysis has begun to be employed to help answer the uncertainties regarding Anglo-Saxon migration; this can indicate whether an individual had always lived near his burial location. However, such studies cannot clearly distinguish ancestry. Thus, a descendant of migrants born in Britain would appear indistinguishable from somebody of native British origin.

Strontium data in a 5th–7th-century cemetery in West Heslerton implied the presence of two groups: one of "local" and one of "nonlocal" origin. Although the study suggested that they could not define the limits of local variation and identify immigrants with confidence, they could give a useful account of the issues. Oxygen and strontium isotope data in an early Anglo-Saxon cemetery at Wally Corner, Berinsfield in the Upper Thames Valley, Oxfordshire, found only 5.3% of the sample originating from continental Europe, supporting the hypothesis of acculturation. Furthermore, they found that there was no change in this pattern over time, except amongst some females. Another isotope test, conducted in 2018 from skeletons found near Eastbourne in Sussex, concluded that neither the traditional invasion model nor the elite acculturation model was applicable. The study found a large number of migrants, both male and female, who seemed to be less wealthy than the natives. There was evidence of continued migration throughout the early Anglo-Saxon period.

Another isotopic method has been employed to investigate whether protein sources in human diets in the early Anglo-Saxon varied with geographic location, or with respect to age or sex. This would provide evidence for social advantage. The results suggest that protein sources varied little according to geographic location and that terrestrial foods dominated at all locations.

== Notable sites ==
- Sutton Hoo
- West Stow Anglo-Saxon Village
- Yeavering
- Taplow Barrow
- Mucking (archaeological site)
- Prittlewell royal Anglo-Saxon burial
- Walkington Wold burials
- Staffordshire Hoard
- Canterbury-St Martin's hoard
- Snape

== See also ==
- Anglo-Saxon hoards
- Anglo-Saxon numismatics
- Anglo-Saxon glass

== Sources ==
- Brown, Michelle P.; Farr, Carol A., eds. (2001), Mercia: An Anglo-Saxon Kingdom in Europe, Leicester: Leicester University Press, ISBN 978-0-8264-7765-1
- Cleary, Simon Esmonde (1993), "Approaches to the differences between late Romano-British and early Anglo-Saxon archaeology", Anglo-Saxon Studies in Archaeology and History 6
- Cool, HEM (2000), Wilmott, T; Wilson, P (eds.), "The parts left over: material culture into the 5th century", The Late Roman Transition in the North (299), BAR
- Hamerow, Helena (2002), Early Medieval Settlements: The Archaeology of Rural Communities in Northwest Europe, 400–900, Oxford University Press, ISBN 978-0-19-924697-7
- Haywood, John (1999), Dark Age Naval Power: Frankish & Anglo-Saxon Seafaring Activity (revised ed.), Frithgarth: Anglo-Saxon Books, ISBN 978-1-898281-43-6
- Higham, Nick (2004), "From sub-Roman Britain to Anglo-Saxon England: Debating the Insular Dark Ages", History Compass, 2: **, doi:10.1111/j.1478-0542.2004.00085.x
- Jones, Barri; Mattingly, David (1990), An Atlas of Roman Britain, Cambridge: Blackwell Publishers (published 2007), ISBN 978-1-84217-067-0
- Kirby, D. P. (2000), The Earliest English Kings (Revised ed.), London: Routledge, ISBN 978-0-415-24211-0
- Russo, Daniel G. (1998), Town Origins and Development in Early England, c. 400–950 A.D., Greenwood Publishing Group, ISBN 978-0-313-30079-0
- Snyder, Christopher A. (2003), The Britons, Malden: Blackwell Publishing (published 2005), ISBN 978-0-631-22260-6
- Yorke, Barbara (1990), Kings and Kingdoms of Early Anglo-Saxon England, B. A. Seaby, ISBN 978-0-415-16639-3
- Yorke, Barbara (1995), Wessex in the Early Middle Ages, London: Leicester University Press, ISBN 978-0-7185-1856-1
- Yorke, Barbara (2006), Robbins, Keith (ed.), The Conversion of Britain: Religion, Politics and Society in Britain c.600–800, Harlow: Pearson Education Limited, ISBN 978-0-582-77292-2
- Zaluckyj, Sarah, ed. (2001), Mercia: The Anglo-Saxon Kingdom of Central England, Little Logaston: Logaston, ISBN 978-1-873827-62-8
