= Margaret Ursula Jones =

British archaeologist (1916–2001)

- Jones recording pottery at Mucking
- Born: Margaret Ursula Owen; 16 May 1916; Birkenhead, England
- Died: 23 March 2001 (aged 84)
- Spouse: Tom Jones (m. 1940; died 1993)
- Scientific career
- Fields: Rescue archaeology; Anglo-Saxon archaeology
- Institutions: Mucking

Margaret Ursula Jones (née Owen, 16 May 1916 – 23 March 2001) was an English archaeologist, best known for directing major excavations at Mucking, Essex.

Born in Birkenhead, Jones first became involved in archaeology while studying at the University of Liverpool, where she volunteered on W. J. Varley's excavations. After graduating she worked as a wartime postal censor and freelance photojournalist, whilst continuing to volunteer on archaeological excavations around Britain. In 1956, Jones began working for the Ministry of Works as a freelance archaeologist in the burgeoning field of rescue archaeology. She worked at a number of sites, but is best known for her excavations at Mucking, a major Anglo-Saxon settlement and associated cemetery, with finds ranging from the Stone Age to the medieval period.

The Mucking excavation, which Jones directed from 1965 to 1978, became Britain's largest ever archaeological excavation. It produced an unprecedented volume of material, although some academic archaeologists have criticised the fact that the results did not appear in print until decades after the excavation had ended. Jones' work at Mucking, as well as her role in founding the campaign group Rescue, was influential in the establishment of modern commercial archaeology in Britain.

== Early years (1916–1956) ==
Margaret Ursula Owen was born on 16 May 1916 to middle-class parents in Birkenhead. She attended Calder High School for Girls in Liverpool before going on to read Geography at the University of Liverpool.

At Liverpool, Jones was taught by archaeologist W. J. Varley and volunteered on his excavations of hillforts in Cheshire in the late 1930s. On these excavations she met Tom Jones, another of Varley's assistant excavators (Tom Jones was a member of the university rowing club, which Varley coached), whom she married in June 1940.

Jones worked as a postal censor during the Second World War. Afterwards, she and her husband moved to Hereford and made a living as freelance photojournalists; Margaret wrote articles to accompany photographs taken by Tom.

== Freelance archaeologist (1956–1965) ==
While working as photojournalists, the Joneses continued to volunteer on archaeological excavations around Britain, and in 1956 Margaret began working as a freelance archaeologist for the Ministry of Works. At the time the Ministry was responsible for the upkeep of Ancient Monuments and, by extension, the large volume of rescue archaeology required to document archaeological sites before they were destroyed by the postwar construction boom. A small workforce of itinerant archaeologists were employed to excavate these sites in advance of development. Between 1956 and 1965, Margaret Jones directed a number of such excavations in Buckinghamshire, Yorkshire and Lincolnshire (including Old Sleaford).

== Mucking (1965–1978) ==
In 1965, the Ministry of Works asked Jones to conduct an excavation at Linford, a gravel pit near the village of Mucking on the Thames Estuary. The site had been discovered in aerial photographs taken by Kenneth St Joseph and confirmed in a small fieldwalking survey by the Thurrock Local History Society. These initial investigations resulted in the site being designated a Scheduled Monument under the Ancient Monuments Act 1931 and, since it was threatened by gravel extraction, prompted the Ministry to commission an exploratory excavation. Jones quickly concluded that the crop marks at Mucking represented an extensive site with Iron Age, Roman, Anglo-Saxon and early Medieval remains. On that basis, the Ministry extended her contract and initiated a full excavation of the site.

The Mucking excavation was to become the largest ever carried out in Britain. To keep ahead of its destruction by the gravel company that owned it, Jones, assisted by her husband Tom, directed work at the site continuously for 13 years. Unusually, they excavated all year round, living in a small caravan and employing a shifting workforce of freelance archaeologists and volunteers from around the world. When it finally completed in 1978, the excavation covered 44 acres and had recorded 44,000 archaeological features, including Beaker burials; a Bronze Age hillfort; an Iron Age settlement and cemetery; a Roman villa and cemetery; one of the most significant Anglo-Saxon settlements in Britain; two large Anglo-Saxon cemeteries; and a Medieval field system. It involved 5000 archaeologists and volunteers and recovered 1.7 million finds.

As the largest excavation in Britain, Mucking was renowned amongst archaeologists in the late 1960s and 1970s: in its obituary of Jones, The Independent said of it, "for a generation of respectable middle-aged archaeologists ... to have dug with Margaret Jones at Mucking remains a badge of honour". Many young archaeologists passed through the site, including Mike Pitts, Paul Barford and Monica Barnes. The site was run on a tight budget, and the living conditions there were notorious:

The conditions were tough: accommodation ranged from your own tent to leaking huts; food was the cheapest line from the cash and carry, creatively supplemented with wild gleanings (I once asked the cook what was for supper, to learn she had spent her afternoon removing, as instructed, mouse-droppings from a sack of rice); and entertainment consisted of a night-time drive round one of the uncannily-automated oil-refining stations along the coast.

— Mike Pitts

Jones herself also gained a reputation as an eccentric and intimidating figure: "indomitable, formidable, disinclined to suffer fools but very kind to those she considered worth helping, dedicated and inventive". She was known for issuing "terse memos" signed simply, "–muj".

== Later years (1978–2001) ==
After completing the excavations at Mucking in 1978, the Joneses retired from field archaeology and returned to their cottage in Hereford. Margaret became the patron of the Thurrock Local History Society (the source of many volunteers to the Mucking excavation) and sat on many other archaeology committees in Essex. In this role she regularly gave lectures, guided tours and talks to schoolchildren across the county.

Margaret Jones died on 23 March 2001. In her later years she had had Parkinson's disease, and was predeceased by her husband Tom, who died following a stroke in 1993.

== Legacy ==
Jones' career took place against a backdrop of increasing professionalization and commercialization of archaeology, which Jones herself had a hand in birthing. During her work as a freelance archaeologist for the Ministry of Works in the 1950s and 60s, Jones saw the rapid destruction of archaeological sites by construction and development, and bemoaned the lack of resources allocated to properly documenting it. Jones and her colleagues were paid only a day-rate for time spent digging and the costs directly incurred, precluding any post-excavation analysis or publication of their finds. Although Mucking was the largest excavation in the country for over a decade, she ran it on a shoestring budget, relying heavily on volunteer labour. In 1973 she was involved in founding the campaign group Rescue, which lobbied for increased government funding for rescue archaeology. This initiative was ultimately successful, increasingly shifting the labour of pre-development excavation from volunteers to professional archaeologists, and culminating in the creation of modern commercial archaeology with the publication of Planning Policy Guidance Note 16 in 1991. According to her obituarist Mike Pitts, Jones also influenced the formation of modern rescue archaeology in Britain by demonstrating "dogged salvage excavation on a grand scale" at Mucking.

Academic archaeologists criticised Jones' work at Mucking as one of the prime examples of "excavation without publication". They argued that since the primary aim of any archaeological excavation is "preservation by record", failing to publish the results amounted to destroying the archaeology without purpose, and that it was irresponsible to excavate large areas without the means to properly process and disseminate the results. Indeed, in thirteen years of continuous excavation at Mucking, Jones only published a single, short paper on the results of her trial excavations in 1965. When the project was completed in 1978, despite the huge volume of material that had been recovered, very little had been analysed and none had been published. Ultimately, the final publication of Mucking was undertaken by others (English Heritage and the Cambridge Archaeological Unit), the first volume of which did not appear until 2015, fourteen years after Jones' death. Jones argued that as the site was being constantly destroyed by the gravel extraction on the site, she could not afford to take time out of the year for post-excavation, nor did she have the funding to complete it.

Despite her sometimes fearsome reputation as director of the Mucking excavation, archaeologist Monica Barnes considered Jones a role model:

Many people were intimidated by Mucking's excavator, Mrs. Margaret U. Jones, B.A., as she signed herself, but I saw her as a role model, a strong, dedicated, no-nonsense woman of great professional skill, with a very complex and important project. I felt that earning Margaret's trust was a real honor. It was only years later, when I read some of the Mucking publications, that I learned that she had never managed anything of that scope before, and was, by her own admission, figuring things out as she went along. She did a splendid job.

== Bibliography ==
- Jones, M. U.; Evison, V. I.; Myres, J. N. L. (1968). "Crop-Mark Sites at Mucking, Essex". The Antiquaries Journal. 48 (2): 210–230. doi:10.1017/S0003581500034892. ISSN 1758-5309. S2CID 162186510.
- Jones, Margaret Ursula (1973). "An ancient landscape palimpsest at Mucking". Transactions of the Essex Archaeological Society. 5.
- Elsdon, Sheila Mary; Jones, Margaret Ursula (1997). Old Sleaford Revealed: A Lincolnshire Settlement in Iron Age, Roman, Saxon and Medieval Times: Excavations 1882–1995. Nottingham Studies in Archaeology Volume 2. Oxford: Oxbow Books. ISBN 978-1-900188-32-6.
