= List of archaeological sites in Thurrock =

This list of archaeological sites includes finds and excavations that have taken place in the area now covered by the Thurrock unitary authority. The list is arranged by location and then chronologically by the date of the discovery or excavation. The archaeological finds and features cover all periods from the Paleolithic to the 20th century. Most editions of Panorama (the Journal of the Thurrock Local History Society) contain further information about local archaeology. A brief review of archaeology in Thurrock by the Mucking weekenders is in an article by Margaret Jones in Panorama 24. There is a fuller account of archaeology in Thurrock between 1954 and 2002 (including reminiscences of the Mucking excavation) in Thurrock Gold published by the Thurrock Local History Society.

Recent editions of Essex Archaeology and History contain short reports of archaeological activity in Essex (including Thurrock) during the previous year. These reports include trial excavations and surveys that revealed no significant features or finds and which are not included in this list.

This list does not include most individual finds housed in the Thurrock Museum. A list of Paleolithic and Neolithic finds was published in Panorama – Journal of the Thurrock Local History Society, 3, 1958. Many Romano-British and Saxon finds in the museum are listed in The Archaeology of Thurrock: Romano-British and Saxon by Randal Bingley (supplement to Panorama – the Journal of the Thurrock Local History Society, 1973).

== Sites of archaeological finds or excavations ==
=== Aveley ===
- Multi-period finds and features (Iron Age to Saxon) (1956)
- The Ice House, Belhus; post-medieval (1979)
- Ship Lane; Iron Age and Romano-British (1994/5)
- Remains of formal gardens at Belhus discovered by geophys; Tudor and Jacobean

=== Chadwell St Mary ===
(See also Tilbury Docks and Tilbury Fort. For Chadwell St Mary Ringworks, see West Tilbury.)

- Medieval mound (1913)
- A Roman oven containing three complete pots, fragments of others and a small clay lamp found south of the road between Chadwell and West Tilbury (1922)
- Saxon pot sherd (1923)
- More than 90 silver Roman denarii coins and neck of a shattered pot found in quarry on Chadwell Hall farm (1956)
- Iron Age and Roman settlement; Roman coins now in Thurrock museum (1959)
- Chadwell St Mary Primary School; Roman coin, pot sherds and tile as well as Saxon finds and features (1996)
- Early Neolithic pit, east of Sabina Road (1997)

=== Corringham ===
- Geomagntetic survey and evaluation trenches found Bronze Age pottery, field boundaries and evidence of ridge and furrow at Southend Road (2008)

=== East Tilbury ===
- Roman tesserae discovered during gravel digging (18th century)
- Unpublished excavation of St Katherine's church revealing earlier tower and south aisle (1890)
- Foreshore; Romano-British huts (1920s)
- Bronze Age ring ditch (1959–60)
- Coalhouse Fort; post medieval military features (two excavations and fieldwork, 1984–2000)
- Large numbers of Saxon coins found by metal detectorists at a "productive site" (1980s and 90s)
- Bronze Age cremation burials (1993)

=== Fobbing ===
- Medieval rubbish pit with sherds of medieval coarse ware and Mill Green ware (2004).
- Evidence of occupation during the Neolithic, Bronze Age, Iron Age, and Roman as well as farming in the early Anglo-Saxon discovered by an appraisal prior to development at Dry Street (2006).

=== Grays ===
- Iron age and Roman artifacts found in Brickworks (c. 1870)
- Collection of clay pipes found during demolition of the east side of the High Street.
- The Bull Inn; medieval domestic items (1970)

=== Horndon-on-the-Hill ===
- Woolmarket; medieval pottery and other medieval items (1969)
- Corner of Mill Lane and High Road; medieval pottery (3 excavations; 1990–1996)
- Corner of Mill Lane and High Street; 13th or 14th century gravelled market surface

=== Langdon Hills ===
- The Park; Iron Age pottery (1966)
- Mesolithic flint tools and pot boilers at a number of sites (1995–2014)

=== Little Thurrock ===
(see also Tilbury Docks)

- Globe Pit, – discovery of clactonian (paleolithic) flint tools (1949–1954)
- Rookery Hill; Neolithic flints and medieval pottery sherds (1969–70)
- Palmer's Girls School; Romano-British kiln (1970)
- Rectory Road; Bronze Age and Iron Age settlement(1980)

=== Mucking ===
- Linford; precursor to the Mucking excavation which revealed multi-period finds and features (Iron Age to Anglo Saxon) (1955)
- The Mucking Excavation; continuous excavation under Margaret Jones with multi-period finds and features (Neolithic to Medieval) (1965–1978)
- Mucking Flats; timber structure identified within Mucking Creek
- Mucking Flats; Iron Age and Roman salt making; roundhouse and boathouse (2009)

=== Orsett ===
- Cherry Orchard Farm, – Romano-British finds (before 1965)
- Neolithic causewayed enclosure, previously noticed on aerial photographs and Saxon inhumations (1975)
- Orsett Cock; Iron Age, Romano-British and Saxon finds and features (1976)
- Baker Street; Bronze Age and Iron Age sherds (1980)
- Barrington's Farm; Early Saxon (1983)
- Orsett crop mark complex; fieldwalking identified worked flints, pottery, tile, glass and one large building stone. Finds demonstrated the growth of nearby settlement, in the post-medieval period (2019).

=== Purfleet ===
Sites listed under West Thurrock

=== South Ockendon ===
- South Ockendon Hall; investigation of apparently Romano-British mounds (1954 and 1961)
- Romano-British pottery (1966)
- Hill Farm; Romano-British cremation (1967)
- Belhus Park; Iron Age and Roman features, Medieval settlements (1980)
- South Ockendon Hospital; investigation prior to redevelopment suggested Bronze Age settlement, 1995

=== Stanford-le-Hope ===
- Prehistoric, Roman and Saxon finds in gravel pit (1930s)
- Stanford le Hope bypass; numerous small finds, Paleolithic to Medieval (1970)
- Saxon jar (1977)
- Great Garlands Farm; late medieval (1999)

=== Stifford ===
- Investigation of deneholes (1956)
- Primrose Island; Romano-British finds (1960)
- Ardale School; Neolithic, Iron Age, Roman, Early Saxon and medieval (1979/80)
- Neolithic to medieval including an early Saxon building (1980)
- Primrose Island; Iron Age, Roman and Early Saxon (1979/80)
- Stifford Primary School; Medieval oven and Roman and Medieval field boundaries (1995)
- Remnants of a Saxon building discovered during building work on the church tower (2005)

=== Tilbury Docks ===
- Mesolithic skeleton found during the construction of the docks (1883)
- Observation of Roman material from a possible town during the construction of the docks (1885)

=== Tilbury Fort ===
- Post medieval military features (numerous, 1973–2010)

=== West Thurrock ===
- Building work at St Clements revealed a circular wall (1906)
- Excavation of St Clement's revealed earlier buildings (1912)
- Earlier church with circular nave on the site of St Clement's (1979)
- Armour Road; investigation prior to development found worked flints and fossils
- High House, Purfleet; evaluation identified features from Neolithic to post medieval (1999)
- Excavation at High House, Purfleet revealed various features from late prehistoric to early Roman (2002)
- Excavation at Stone House revealed 13th or 14th century stone building (2002)

=== West Tilbury ===
(see also Tilbury Fort)

- Discovery of Roman coin and urn while digging a ditch (1850s)
- Gun Hill; Paleolithic and neolithic flint tools, Bronze Age features, Romano-British finds and early Saxon grubenhaus(1973)
- Rainbow Wood (Rainbow Shaw); Iron Age (1974)
- Mill House Farm; Bronze and Iron Age pottery and Late Bronze Age and Saxon settlement evidence such as ring ditches, enclosure ditches, gullies, pits and postholes to the east of Chadwell St Mary (2010–2014) (Note: Although the current postal address of this site is Chadwell-St-Mary, it is in the historic parish of West Tilbury.)
