= Walkington =

Village and civil parish in the East Riding of Yorkshire, England

Coordinates: 53.820636°N 0.487977°W

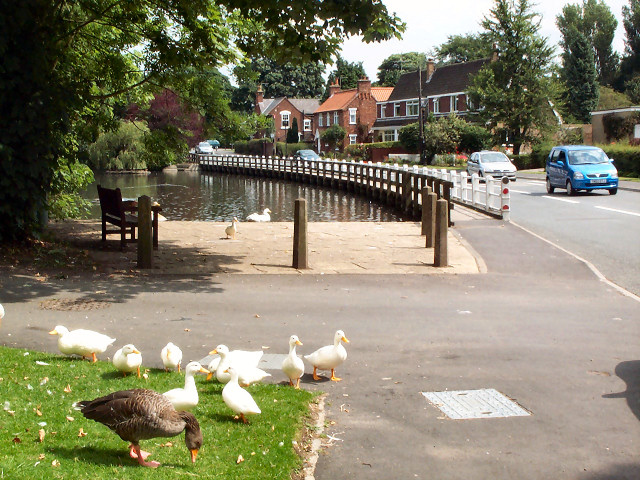
- The village pond

- Location within the East Riding of Yorkshire
- Population: 2,337 (2011 census)
- OS grid reference: SE996371
- Civil parish: Walkington
- Unitary authority: East Riding of Yorkshire
- Ceremonial county: East Riding of Yorkshire
- Region: Yorkshire and the Humber
- Country: England
- Sovereign state: United Kingdom
- Post town: BEVERLEY
- Postcode district: HU17
- Dialling code: 01482
- Police: Humberside
- Fire: Humberside
- Ambulance: Yorkshire
- UK Parliament: Beverley and Holderness

Walkington is a village and civil parish in the East Riding of Yorkshire, England. It is situated approximately 3 miles (4.8 km) to the south-west of the town of Beverley on the B1230 road, and Beverley Grammar School.

The civil parish consists of the village of Walkington and the hamlet of Broadgate, located to the east of the village. According to the 2011 UK census, Walkington parish had a population of 2,337, a reduction on the 2001 UK census figure of 2,481.

The name Walkington derives from the Old English Walcaingtūn meaning 'settlement connected with Walca'.

Broadgate is the site of a former mental hospital, named Broadgate Hospital.

== Facilities ==
In the centre of Walkington is a village pond.

The village has three public houses located along the main road, East End, the Barrel, the Ferguson Fawsitt Arms, and the Dog and Duck. The Ferguson closed its doors on 4 October 2020 due to the coronavirus pandemic, although it reopened under new owners in early 2022.

The village school, Walkington Primary School is situated in Crake Wells, a minor street at the east end of the village. Before the year 1999 the school was divided between two sites, which included the original school house at Northgate which dates back to the late 19th century. Before this, the street was called "School Lane". However, after a costly extension to the Crake Wells building, the infant and junior sections were joined in 1999. The new building was officially opened by then Education Secretary David Blunkett, in October that year.

The parish church of All Hallows is a Grade II* listed building. A Methodist church is situated next to West End.

== Ancient history ==
A few miles west of Walkington is the Bronze Age barrow complex of Walkington Wold. The remains there include the Walkington Wold Burials, the decapitated remains of Anglo-Saxon criminals.

To the east of the village is one of the medieval stone boundary markers for the sanctuary of Saint John of Beverley, now a Scheduled Ancient Monument.

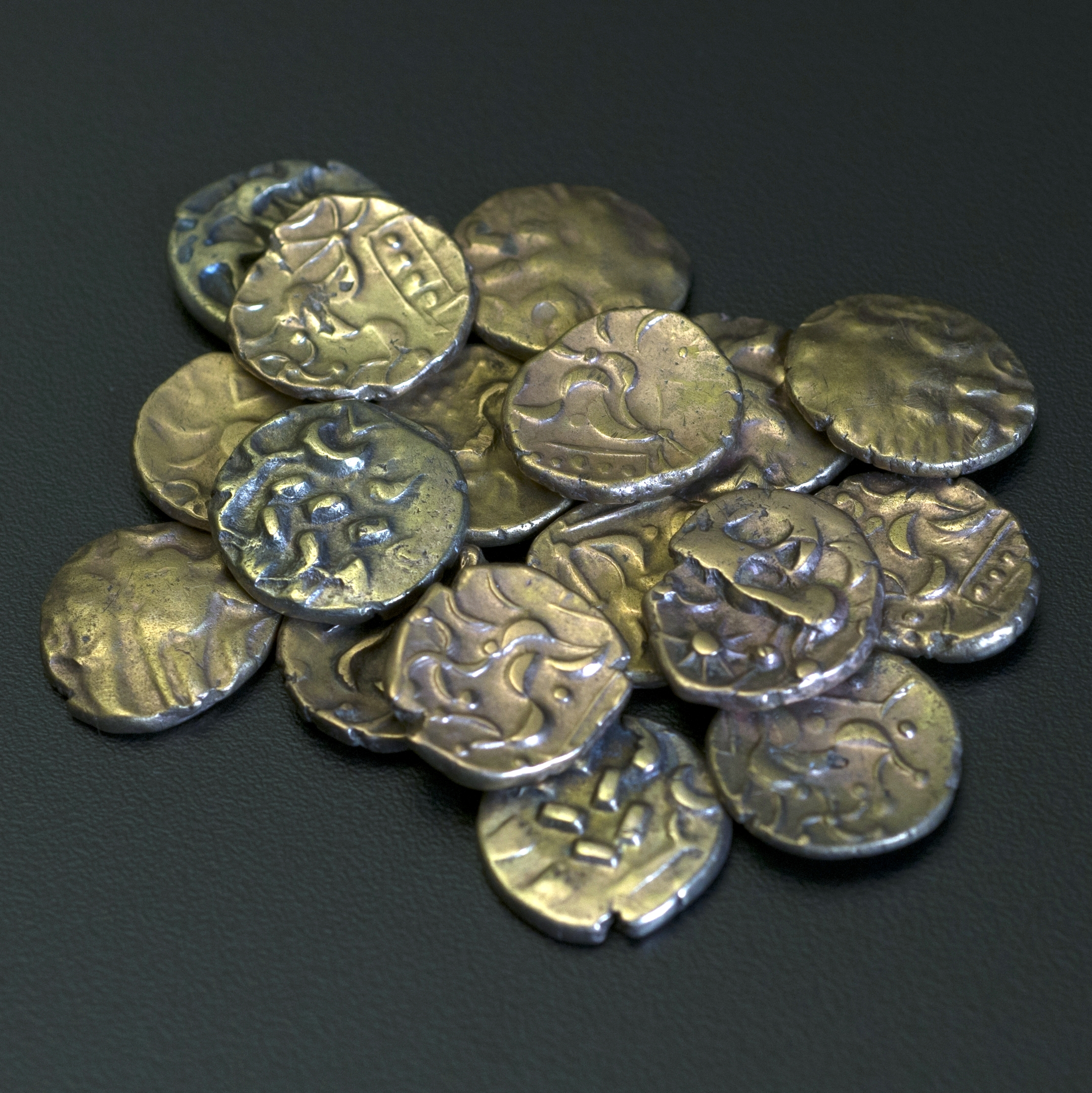
Selection of Corieltauvi Celtic coins from the Walkington Hoard

The Walkington Hoard and other coins of the Corieltauvi tribe were discovered in large numbers between 2001 and 2008. They are now at the Yorkshire Museum.

== See also ==
- Listed buildings in Walkington
