= Stretton-on-Fosse II =

Stretton-on-Fosse II is an Anglo-Saxon cemetery in Warwickshire which is notable for showing intermarriage between Anglo-Saxon men and Romano-British women. These were uncovered during commercial extraction of sand. These burials were the result of internecine warfare between local tribal factions.

It is located on the western fringes of the early Anglo-Saxon settlement area. the proportion of male adults with weapons is 82%, well above the average in southern England. Cemetery II, the Anglo-Saxon burial site, is immediately adjacent to two Romano-British cemeteries, Stretton-on-Fosse I and III, the latter only 60 metres (200 feet) away from Anglo-Saxon burials.

Continuity of the native female population at this site has been inferred from the continuity of textile techniques (unusual in the transition from the Romano-British to the Anglo-Saxon periods), and by the continuity of epigenetic traits from the Roman to the Anglo-Saxon burials. At the same time, the skeletal evidence demonstrates the appearance in the post-Roman period of a new physical type of males who are more slender and taller than the men in the adjacent Romano-British cemeteries.

Taken together, the observations suggest the influx of a group of males, probably most or all of them Germanic, who took control of the local community and married native women. It is not easy to confirm such cases of 'warband' settlement in the absence of detailed skeletal, and other complementary, information, but assuming that such cases are indicated by very high proportions of weapon burials, this type of settlement was much less frequent than the kin group model.
