= Mucking (archaeological site) =

Archaeological site in Essex, England

Mucking excavation
- Location within England
- 51°29′38″N 00°25′48″E
- Type: Settlement and associated cemeteries
- Periods: Roman and Anglo-Saxon
- Location: Mucking, Essex, England, United Kingdom

History
- Abandoned: During or after the 8th century

Site notes
- Excavation dates: 1965–1978
- Archaeologists: Margaret Jones and Tom Jones

Mucking is an archaeological site near the village of Mucking in southern Essex. The site contains remains dating from the Neolithic to the Middle Ages—a period of some 3,000 years—and the Bronze Age and Anglo-Saxon features are particularly notable.

Major excavations took place at the site between 1965 and 1978, directed by Margaret Ursula Jones. Covering an area of 18 hectares (44 acres), at the time it was the largest archaeological excavation in Europe, and is the largest excavation ever undertaken in the British Isles. Excavation continued year-round to stay ahead of gravel extraction that was rapidly destroying the site, accumulating an "astonishing" volume of material. Only a fraction of this was analysed or published in Jones' lifetime, and ultimately the bulk of the post-excavation work was left to others. The first volume of a "full publication" was not published until 2015, by which point the post-excavation phase had cost significantly more than the initial excavation. This led some to criticise Mucking as an irresponsible, "excavation without publication".

== Location and discovery ==
The site was on the 100 feet (30 m) gravel terrace, close to the north bank of the Thames, and was owned by Surridge Disposals Ltd. There were a number of other Saxon settlements in the vicinity - see list of archaeological sites in Thurrock. The site was discovered as a result of aerial photographs showing cropmarks and soil marks. The earliest photographs to reveal the site were taken by the Luftwaffe in 1943. However, these were not readily available to archaeologists. The importance of the site was recognised following photographs taken by J. K. St Joseph of Cambridge University on 16 June 1959, although these photos were not published until 1964. The tenant farmer (T. Lindsey) remarked that crop marks for archaeologists were his best crop. Following publication of the crop mark photos, D. G. Macleod of Prittlewell Museum and D. A. Whickham, Chief Librarian for Thurrock realised that the site was threatened by gravel extraction and instigated the scheduling of the site under the Ancient Monuments Act.

An earlier small-scale investigation had been carried out by members of the Thurrock Local History Society, under Ken Barton, on the western side of Buckingham Hill Road, as a result of field walking finds rather than aerial photographs. In late 1965, Margaret Jones was asked to carry out a brief exploratory excavation at a site, then known as Linford, which was slowly being destroyed as a result of gravel digging by Hoveringham Gravels Ltd.

== Jones' excavations (1965–1978) ==
As a result of this exploratory dig, and of the earlier investigations, Jones' contract was extended and she was appointed director of the full scale excavations. She was joined by her husband Tom and in 1965 (after the crops had been harvested) they began the mammoth task that was to last for the next 14 years on the Mucking hill top. The excavation was unusual in that it continued through the winter, unlike most excavations which only took place in the summer. The need to stay ahead of the gravel extraction sometimes meant softening the frozen ground with a blow torch to enable a find to be lifted in time.

The Joneses were assisted by many younger archaeologists and volunteers from Britain and abroad including more than 3,000 students from many countries. The volunteers lived mainly in tents during the warmer months, but in the winter, occupied old caravans and sheds. The organisation of the camp, the feeding, the pay and the volunteers' welfare involved many individuals guided by terse memos signed by the initials "muj". Jones sometimes commented that it was more like a holiday camp than an archaeological dig – although journalist Tina Brown, who visited in 1976, observed that Jones had "devised a stunningly repulsive application form to weed out the loafers". In the final stages of the dig, volunteers were supplemented by local unemployed people, funded by the government Manpower Services Commission job creation scheme. Without this extra assistance, the excavation might not have been completed.

Jones died in 2001. The Independent of 31 March 2001 carried an obituary which said that "for a generation of respectable middle-aged archaeologists ... to have dug with Margaret Jones at Mucking remains a badge of honour". In her will, she left money to fund fieldwork or research related to the Mucking excavations or for landscape archaeology covering the same periods as Mucking.

=== Post-excavation and publication ===
Initial post-excavation analysis took place at the Thurrock Museum and Library from 1978 to 1985. This phase consumed funding of approximately £250,000, compared with £85,000 for the excavations themselves. Post-excavation analysis was hampered by the scale of the excavation and its finds and by the changing expectation of what constituted an excavation archive. The primary archive consisted of 363 notebooks. By the time publication was complete, it was no longer appropriate to provide a narrative and conclusions by the excavator. Instead, it was required that an excavation archive should provide the data to enable a future complete reinterpretation of the finds and alternative conclusions.

The dig was financed by the Inspectorate of Ancient Monuments in the Department of the Environment (a precursor to English Heritage). The dig was criticised in some quarters as "excavation without publication", but Jones defended the need to excavate everything ahead of the gravel extraction and refused to spend valuable time preparing results for publication. Hamerow acknowledges that small-scale sample excavations would not have revealed important features of the site – for example that it was a single settlement, the location of which moved over time rather than separate early and later settlements. Three volumes of excavation results were published by 2009. The Cambridge Archaeological Unit agreed to complete the publication of the excavation reports on the Roman and pre-Roman periods, the first of which was published in December 2015. Initial finance was allocated for this by English Heritage via the Aggregates Levy Sustainability Fund (ALSF). As a result of the delays in preparing for publication, some computer files could not initially be read. More sophisticated data salvage techniques were able to recover more than a million grid references to finds.

== Results ==
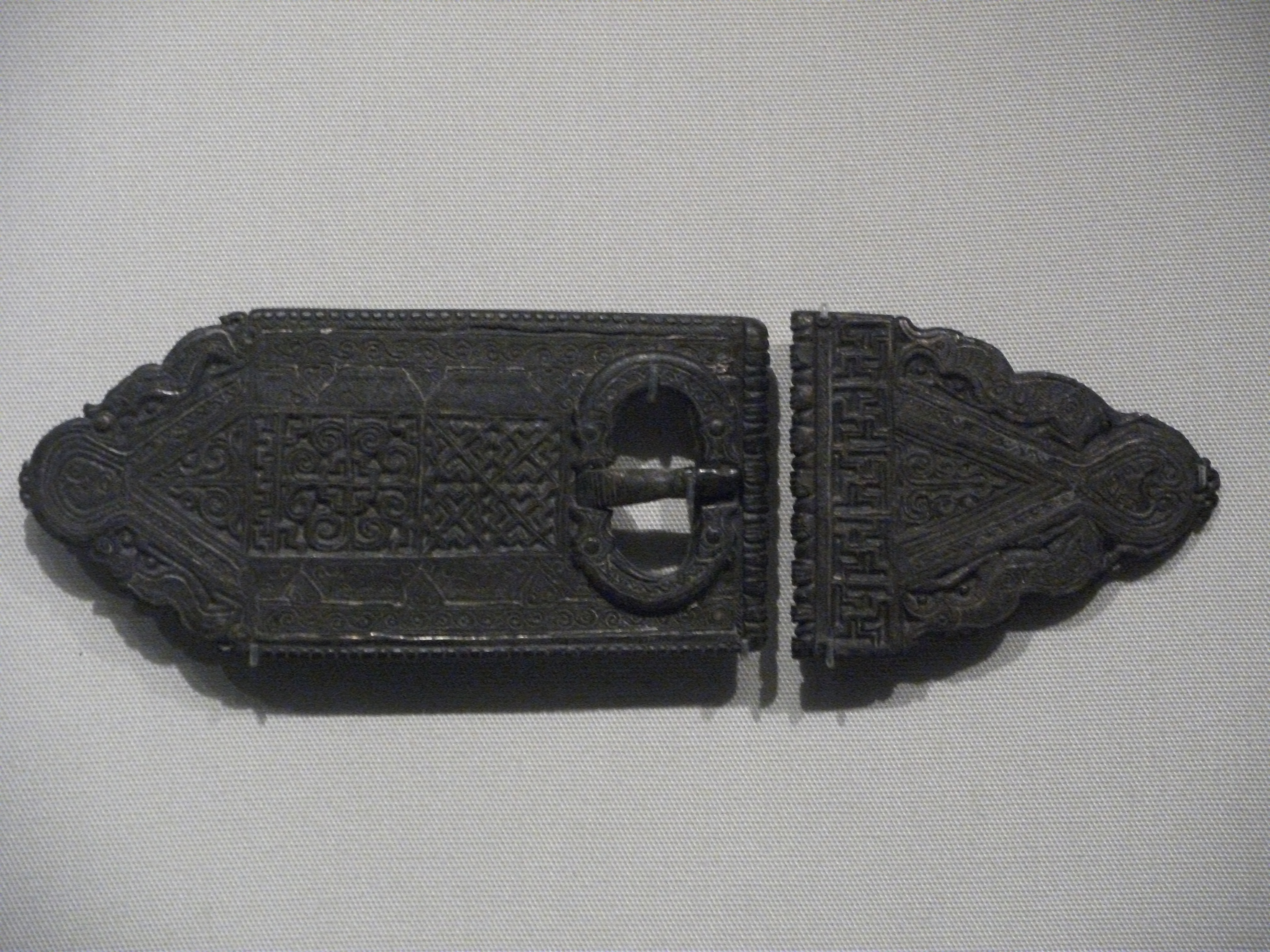
Romano-British or Anglo-Saxon belt fittings from the Anglo-Saxon cemetery at Mucking, 5th century, (British Museum)

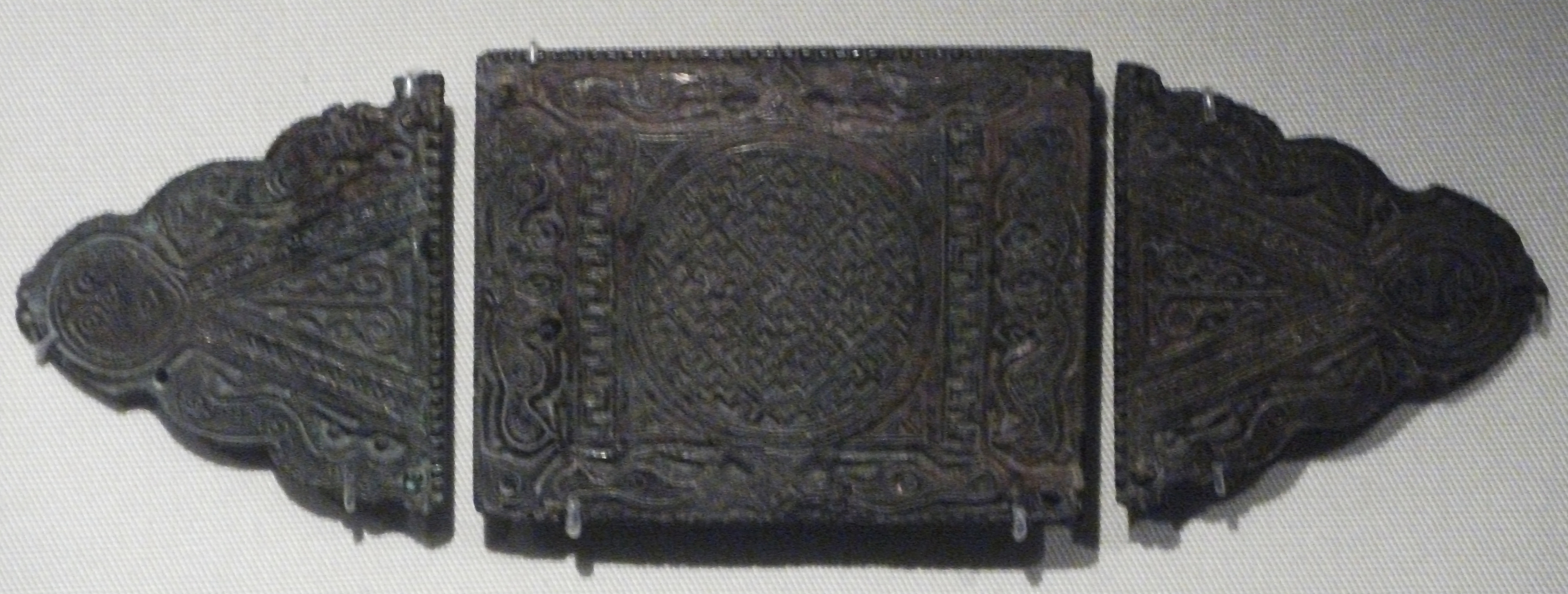
Romano-British or Anglo-Saxon belt fittings from Mucking, 5th century, (British Museum).

The excavation found more than 44,000 archaeological features. These included isolated graves and pits from the Neolithic and a hill fort from the Bronze Age. There were also more than 100 Iron Age round houses and a Romano-British cemetery. The excavations revealed substantial indications of a high status Romano-British building (that Jones had "no doubt" was a villa), located either within the excavation or nearby.

=== The Anglo-Saxon settlement ===
Some analysis suggested that the site had been abandoned by the Romano-British during the 4th century and there was a gap before the Saxon occupation of the site began in the early 5th century. However, "the site’s Late Roman pottery evidence suggests that the Saxons got there very early – possibly even in the later decades of the fourth century". Whether late 4th or early 5th century, this was among the earliest Anglo-Saxon settlements in England. The Anglo-Saxon settlement gradually moved north over the course of two hundred years after its establishment. During or after the 8th century, the settlement was either abandoned, or drifted beyond the area that was excavated. The area previously occupied by the Anglo-Saxon settlement became part of a Saxo-Norman field system.

More than 200 Anglo-Saxon sunken featured buildings (Grubenhaus) were excavated, together with nearly a dozen large timber buildings. These more substantial halls were up to 50 feet (15 m) long and 25 feet (7.6 m) wide with entrances in the middle of both longer sides. There was some evidence of enclosures that may have been animal pens.

=== The Anglo-Saxon cemeteries ===
There were more than 800 burials in the Anglo-Saxon cemeteries ranging in date from the early 5th to the 7th century. Two cemeteries were excavated, although one of them had already been partially destroyed by gravel working. Cemetery II contained cremation and inhumation graves, while cemetery I contained only inhumations. Cemetery II (the undamaged cemetery) contained graves from which 125 brooches were recovered, allowing the reconstruction of Anglo-Saxon dress styles. The cemeteries were not used after the middle 7th century although the settlement continued in to the 8th century. Later burials may have been at a Christian cemetery associated with Cedd's minster church at Tilbury.

=== Finds ===
In addition to the brooches, other finds from the settlement and cemeteries included 5th century domestic Anglo-Saxon pottery and late Roman military belt fittings in the Quoit Brooch Style. More than 5,000 items were donated to the British Museum by the landowners. Some of the original finds from the excavation are displayed in the British Museum, and others are in storage. Some replica finds are in the Thurrock Museum.

== Significance ==
While the finds from other periods are of some interest, it is as an Anglo-Saxon site that Mucking is most significant. Unlike Sutton Hoo or the Royal Saxon tomb in Prittlewell, the dig provided significant information about living and working conditions for people below the status of kings or princes. It was the first time an excavation had covered both a Saxon settlement and its associated cemetery.

Results from the Mucking excavation have been extensively used in illustrating and debating archaeological issues. For example, before the dig was completed, hand-made pottery was illustrated almost entirely by sherds from Mucking in The Archaeology of Anglo-Saxon England by David M. Wilson. Many other authors have used the results. Christopher Arnold and P. Wardle used evidence from Mucking to support the idea that there was a major shift in the location of Anglo-Saxon settlements in the 8th century, from lighter to heavier, but more productive soils. However, Stephen Rippon argued that the later phases of occupation at Mucking had not been excavated. Similarly, results from Mucking have been used in the debate on the numbers of incoming Anglo-Saxons at the end of the Roman period. For example, Della Hooke and others have used the quality of soil at Mucking to suggest that incoming Anglo-Saxons were forced by the local inhabitants to settle on the poorest agricultural land. On the other hand, Myres puts forward the view that the site was chosen by the London authorities "to provide early warning of strange vessels sailing up the river with hostile intent". The discovery of a "Roman style" military buckle in an Anglo-Saxon grave at Mucking has been used to argue for continuity between the Roman and Anglo-Saxon settlement.
