= Broadgate, East Riding of Yorkshire =

Hamlet in the East Riding of Yorkshire, England

Coordinates: 53.825599°N 0.464705°W

Broadgate
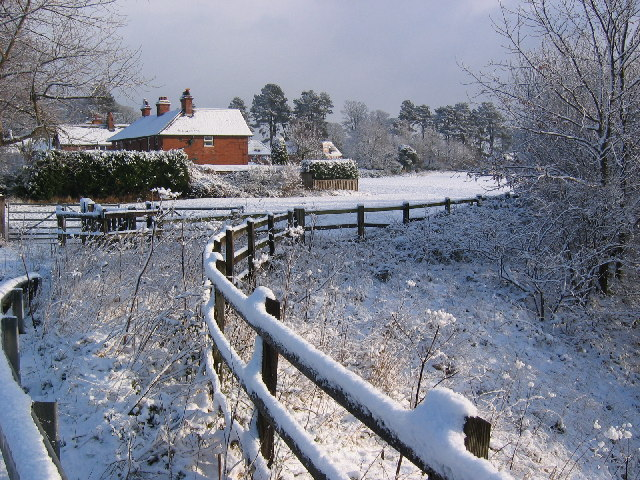
- Houses in the snow

- Location within the East Riding of Yorkshire
- OS grid reference: TA011376
  - London: 160 mi (260 km) S
- Civil parish: Walkington
- Unitary authority: East Riding of Yorkshire
- Ceremonial county: East Riding of Yorkshire
- Region: Yorkshire and the Humber
- Country: England
- Sovereign state: United Kingdom
- Post town: BEVERLEY
- Postcode district: HU17
- Dialling code: 01482
- Police: Humberside
- Fire: Humberside
- Ambulance: Yorkshire
- UK Parliament: Beverley and Holderness

Broadgate is a housing estate close to the village of Walkington, England. It is situated approximately 2 miles (3 km) to the south-west of the market town of Beverley and lies on the B1230 road. Broadgate forms part of the civil parish of Walkington.

Broadgate was the location of the Broadgate Hospital. The land the hospital was built upon was sold by nearby Broadgate Farm, the farm buildings are now converted into a small complex of luxury holiday cottages. After the hospital had been demolished, the former hospital site was redeveloped by Bryant Homes to create the current hamlet.
