= Listed buildings in Walkington =

Walkington is a civil parish in the county of the East Riding of Yorkshire, England. It contains eight listed buildings that are recorded in the National Heritage List for England. Of these, one is listed at Grade II*, the middle of the three grades, and the others are at Grade II, the lowest grade. The parish contains the village of Walkington and the surrounding area. All the listed buildings are in the village and, apart from a church, they are all houses.

== Key ==
Grade	Criteria
II*	Particularly important buildings of more than special interest
II	Buildings of national importance and special interest

== Buildings ==
Name and location	Photograph	Date	Notes	Grade
All Hallows Church; 53.81811°N 0.48469°W		12th century	The church has been altered and extended through the centuries, including a major rebuilding in 1818–19, and a restoration in 1898–99 by Temple Moore. It is built in stone and brick with slate roofs, and consists of a nave, a north porch, north and south transepts, a chancel with a north vestry, and a west tower. The tower has three stages, a chamfered and moulded plinth, diagonal buttresses, moulded string courses, a three-light pointed west window, a pierced quatrefoil on the north side, above which is a canopied niche with crocketed finials, a west clock face, two-light pointed bell openings under a hood mould, and an embattled parapet with crocketed finials. The south doorway dates from about 1200, and it has a pointed arch, a chamfered surround, chamfered imposts and a hood mould.	II*
The Old Rectory; 53.82019°N 0.48586°W		Late 17th to early 18th century	The rectory, later a private house, was altered in 1891 by Temple Moore. It is in brown brick, and has a pantile roof with raised coped gables on shaped kneelers. There is an H-shaped plan, later infilled, with a front and a rear of seven bays, the middle ranges of two storeys and three bays, and cross wings with attics. The garden front has sash windows on the middle range under lintels with paterae, and casements on the cross wings. The entrance front has a doorway with a fanlight, an enriched pulvinated frieze, and a giant timber canopy. On the ground floor are sash windows under segmental relieving arches, the upper floor has two oriel windows on shaped brackets, and above is a shaped gable with heraldic shields.	II
Middle Farmhouse; 53.81981°N 0.49077°W	—	Early 18th century	The house is in limestone and brick on a plinth, with rusticated quoins, belled eaves, and a pantile roof with tiled raised gables and brick tumbling. There are two storeys and an attic, and three bays, the left bay projecting, and a rear outshut. The doorway has a fanlight, and the windows on the front are horizontally sliding sashes, on the ground floor with stucco arches and incised voussoirs, and on the upper floor with timber lintels. On the rear outshut are two doorways with segmental heads and a casement window.	II
Manorhouse; 53.82323°N 0.49111°W		Early 18th century	The house, which was later remodelled and extended, is in red brick with a pantile roof. The original block has two storeys and two bays, a triple-stepped eaves cornice, and tumbled-in brick to the plain close verges on shaped kneelers. It contains sash windows under gauged brick arches with projecting keystones. The extension on the right is recessed, with two storeys and two bays. It contains a doorway with a fanlight and a fanned keystone, and sash windows.	II
34 and 36 Northgate; 53.82177°N 0.48770°W	—	Late 18th century	A pair of houses in red brick, with a dentilled brick eaves cornice, and a pantile roof with tumbled-in brick to the raised coped gables. There is one storey and attics, and three bays. On the front is a doorway in an architrave under a segmental arch, and a blocked doorway. The windows are horizontally sliding sashes, most under segmental arches, and above are three gabled roof dormers.	II
4 East End; 53.82032°N 0.48657°W	—	Late 18th century	The house is in red brick, colurwashed on the front, with a stepped brick eaves cornice, and a pantile roof with tumbled-in brick to the raised gables. There are two storeys and three bays. The central doorway has a fanlight, and a broad canopy on fretted brackets. The windows are sashes, those on the ground floor under segmental brick relieving arches. All the windows have louvred shutters.	II
Northgate House; 53.82170°N 0.48797°W		Late 18th century	The house is in colourwashed brick, with a stepped brick eaves cornice, and a pantile roof with tumbled-in brick to the raised gables on brick kneelers. There are two storeys, three bays and a rear wing. The central doorway has a fanlight and a canopy, the windows are horizontally sliding sashes, and there are two sloping roof dormers.	II
18 West End; 53.82029°N 0.48907°W	—	Early 19th century	The house is in brown brick, and has a pantile roof with raised coped gables. There are two storeys and three bays. The central doorway has pilasters and a fanlight, and the windows are sashes under cambered channelled wedge lintels with feathered keystones.	II
