= Rescue – The British Archaeological Trust =

British charitable organization

Rescue – The British Archaeological Trust is a charitable organisation in the United Kingdom. It was founded in 1971 as a pressure group by a team including the archaeologists Margaret Ursula Jones, Phillip A. Barker, and Martin Biddle.

The Trust campaigns for government funds to permit the excavation of archaeological sites in advance of road-building, construction or other development. Specific actions include opposing the planned tunnel near the site of Stonehenge, proposed in 2017, claiming that it could threaten the site's UNESCO heritage status, and criticising the use of metal detectors to discover items of cultural significance.
