= Walkington Hoard =

Iron Age coin hoard in Britain

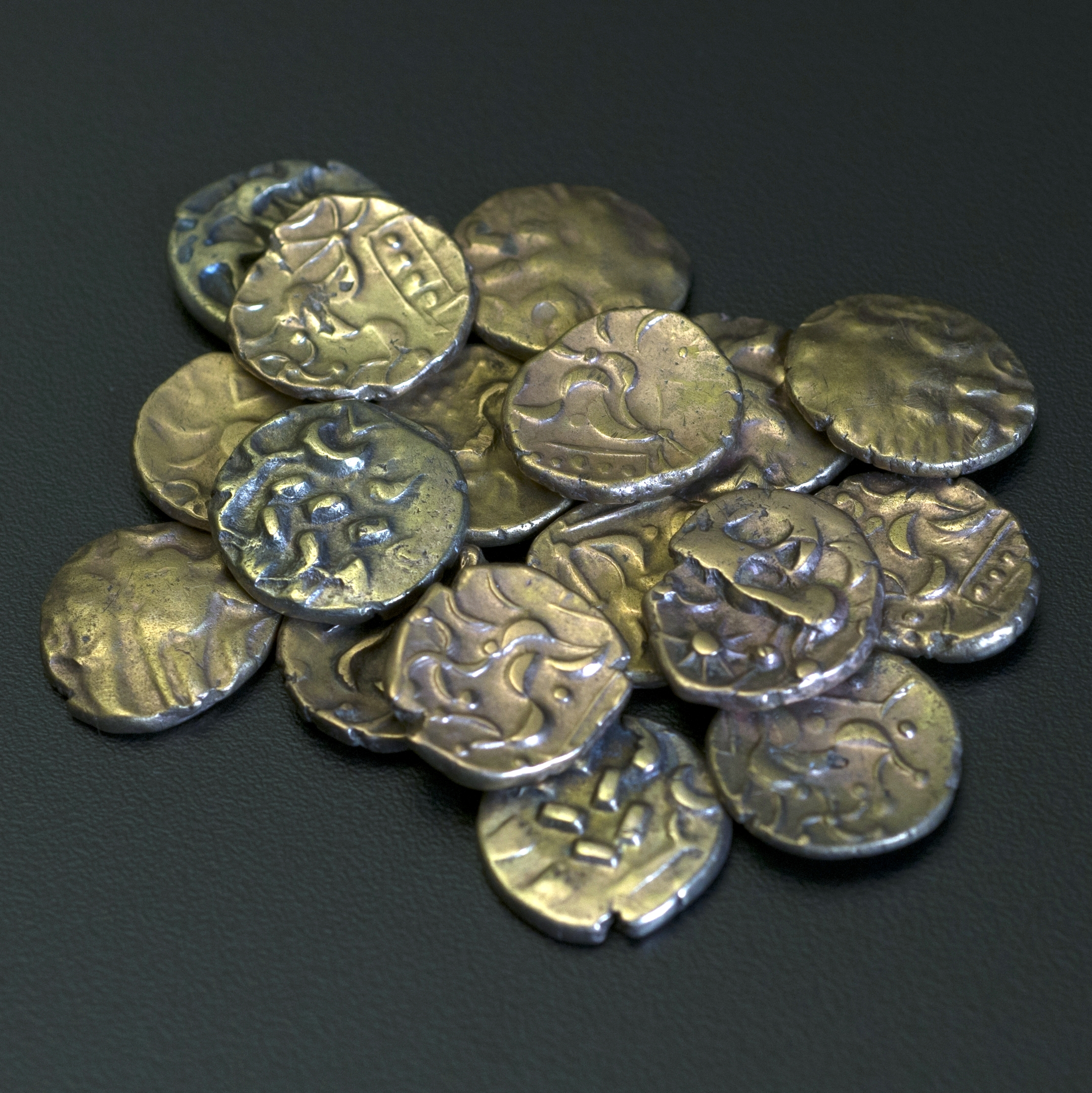
- Coins from the Walkington Hoard in the Yorkshire Museum
- Created: c. 40BC-AD20
- Period/culture: British Iron Age
- Discovered: 1999-2008; Walkington, East Yorkshire
- Present location: Yorkshire Museum, British Museum, Sewerby Hall
- Coordinates: 53.82961974°N 0.50186092°W
- Identification: YORYM : 2005.2202; PAS: IARCH-212957

The Walkington Hoard is a hoard of Corieltavian gold staters. They are a widely scattered hoard which have been found by metal-detectorists over the course of a decade.

== Discovery ==
The first portion of the hoard was discovered in November 1999 and consisted of eleven coins. Subsequent batches were found in: September–October 2000 (35 coins), 2001 (21 coins), 2002 (13 coins), August–September 2003 (18 coins), 2005 (two batches of six coins and three coins), October 2007 (3 coins), 2008 (six coins). At least 116 coins have thus so-far been discovered.

== Acquisition and display ==
The first two groups of coins, the batches of 11 coins from 1999 and 35 coins from 2000, were acquired by the East Riding of Yorkshire Council and went on display in Sewerby Hall. The group of 35 coins were acquired for a cost of £13,500. The group of 18 coins from 2003 was acquired by the Yorkshire Museum.
