= Broadgate Hospital =

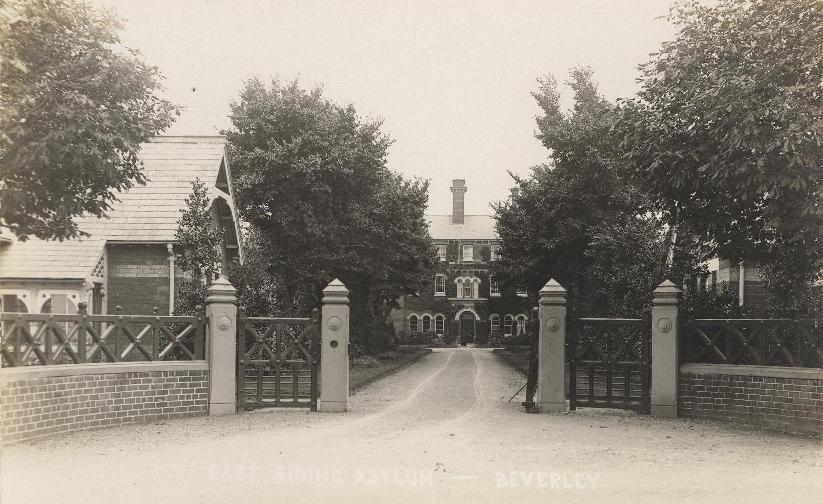
- Broadgate Asylum in 1905

- Shown in the East Riding of Yorkshire

Geography
- Location: Walkington, East Riding of Yorkshire, England
- Coordinates: 53.8271°N 0.4576°W

Organisation
- Care system: NHS
- Type: Specialist

Services
- Emergency department: N/A
- Speciality: Psychiatric Hospital

History
- Founded: 1871
- Closed: 1989

Links
- Lists: Hospitals in England

Broadgate Hospital was a mental health facility to the east of Walkington, East Riding of Yorkshire, England.

== History ==
The hospital was located on a site previously occupied by Broadgate Farm. It was designed by Charles Henry Howell using a Corridor Plan layout and opened as the East Riding County Asylum in October 1871. It became the East Riding Mental Hospital in the 1920s before joining the National Health Service as Broadgate Hospital in 1948.

After the introduction of Care in the Community in the early 1980s, the hospital went into a period of decline and, once the patients had been transferred to De la Pole Hospital in Willerby, Broadgate Hospital closed in April 1989. The buildings have since been demolished and the site has been redeveloped by Bryant Homes as a new village known as Broadgate.
