= Quoit brooch =

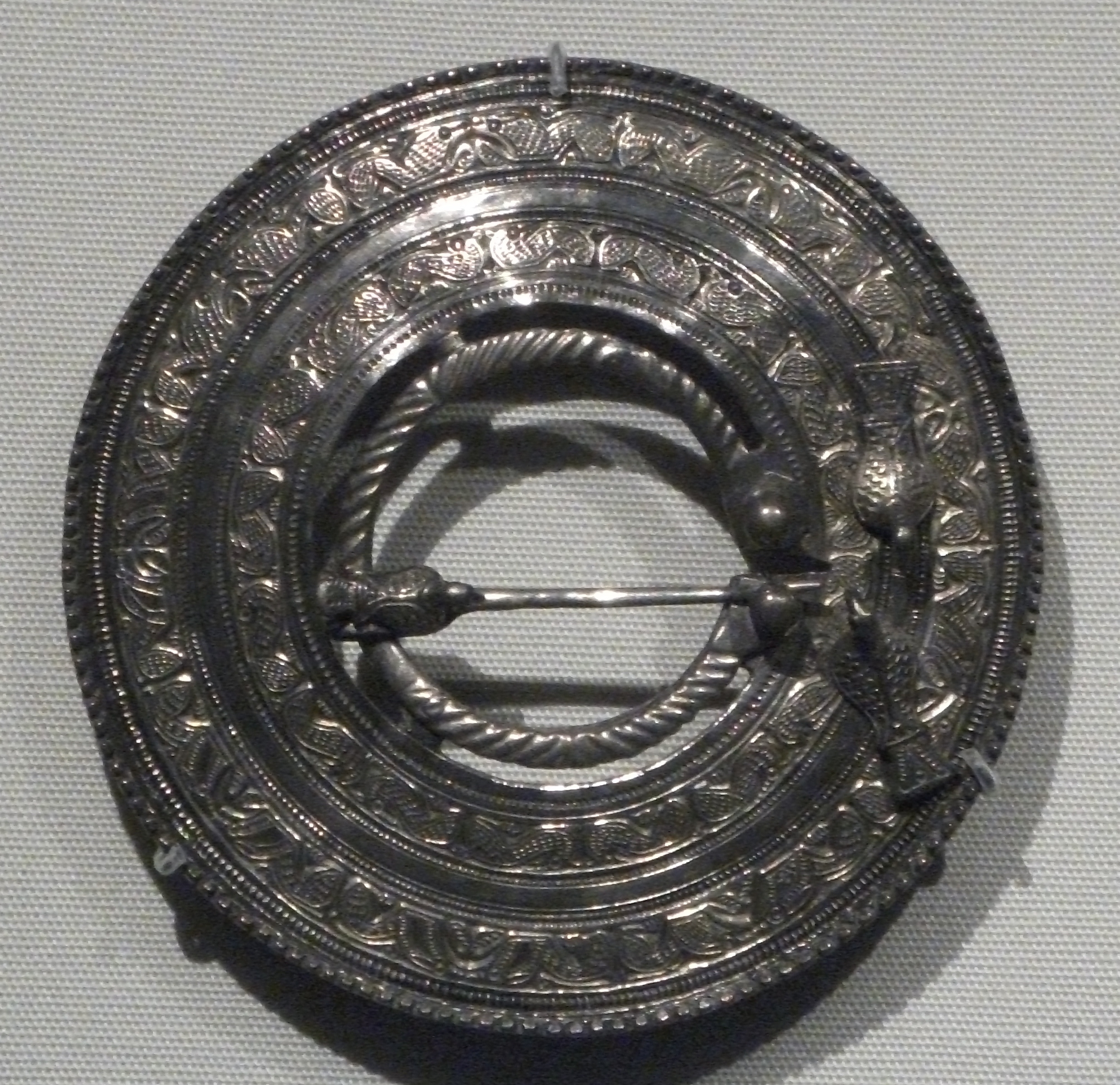
The Sarre Brooch in the British Museum

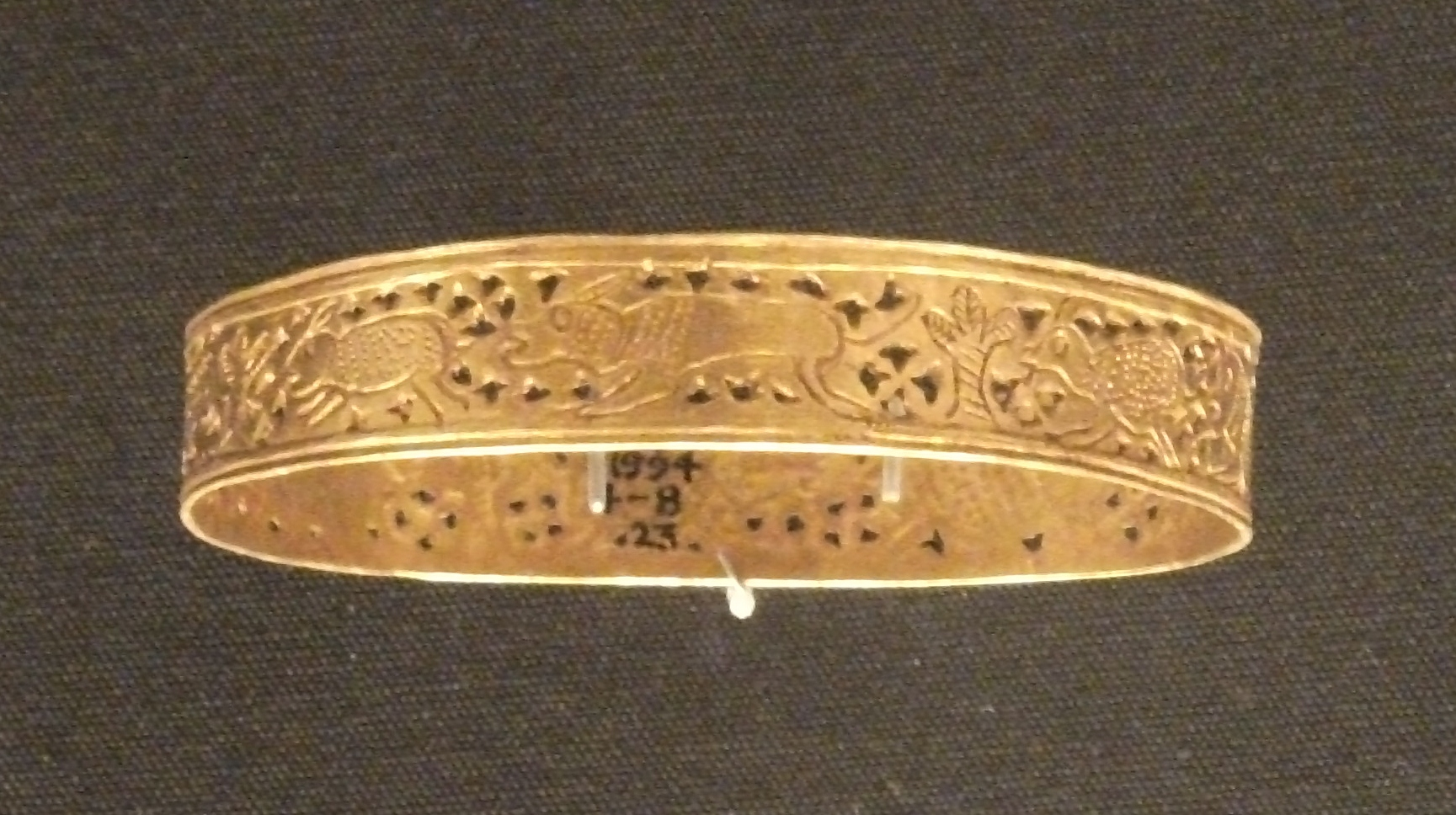
British-made Roman bracelet from the Hoxne hoard with similar animals

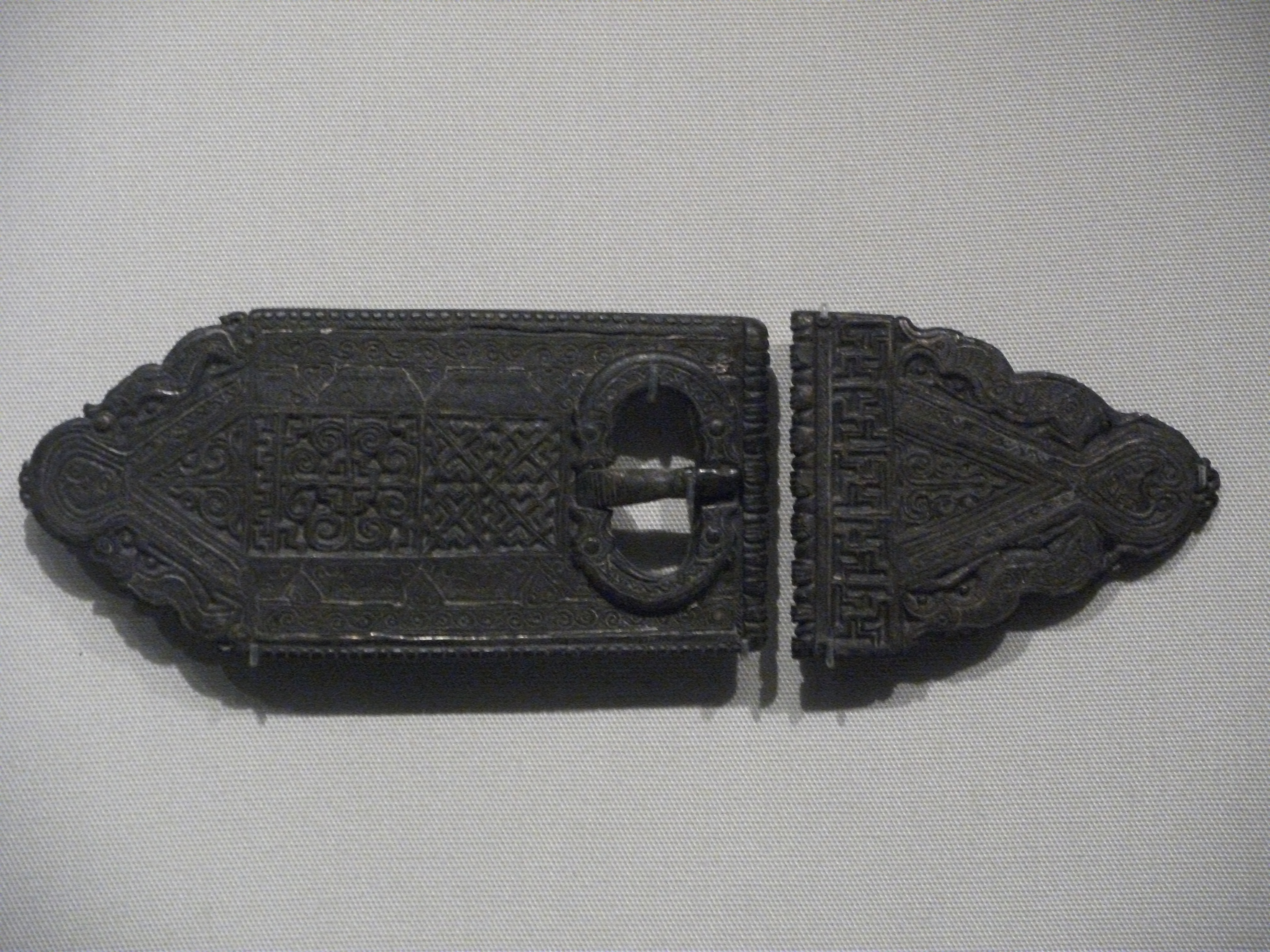
Romano-British or Anglo-Saxon belt fittings from the Mucking archaeological site, 5th century

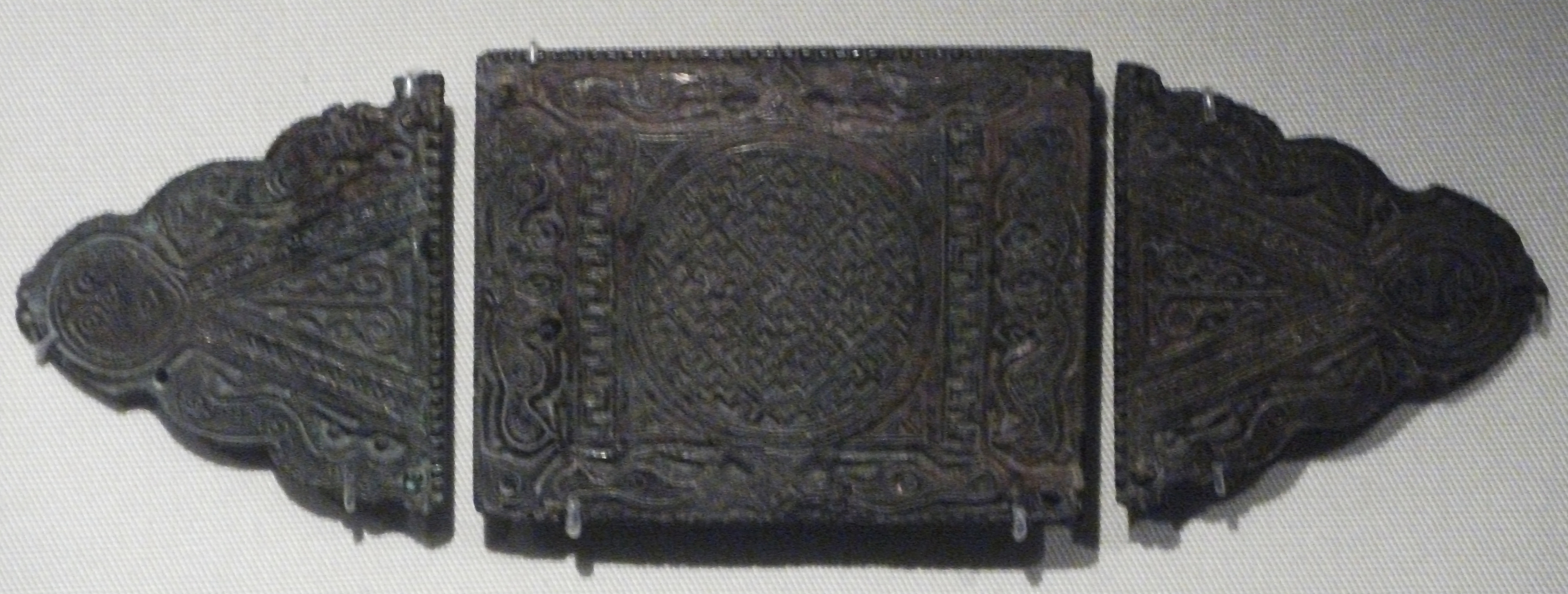
Romano-British or Anglo-Saxon belt fittings from Mucking, 5th century

The quoit brooch is a type of Anglo-Saxon brooch found from the 5th century and later during the Anglo-Saxon settlement of Britain that has given its name to the Quoit Brooch Style to embrace all types of Anglo-Saxon metalwork in the decorative style typical of the finest brooches. The brooches take their modern name from the rings thrown in the game of quoits, and have the form of a broad ring, or circle with an empty centre, usually in bronze or silver (sometimes inlaid with silver or gold respectively), and often highly decorated. The forms are in a very low relief, so contrasting with other early Anglo-Saxon styles, with detail added by shallow engraving or punching within the main shapes. Dots or dashes are often used to represent fur on the animal forms, as well as lines emphasizing parts of the body. They are fixed with a single, straight hinged pin like those of other Anglo-Saxon ring or Celtic brooches and are further defined by the presence of a slot and pin-stops on the ring.

== Origins and context ==
Most scholars now agree that the style developed mainly from provincial late Roman metalwork styles, apparently drawing elements from both the relatively low-status jewellery found in military graves in northern Gaul and England such as belt buckles and fittings, and also late-Roman luxury work such as the style in one bracelet in the very late Roman Hoxne Hoard. In the Quoit Brooch Style the very varied motifs are largely geometrical but include human face-masks and processions or confronted pairs of schematic animals. In most pieces the motifs are tightly packed together in a way lacking classical harmony, but comparable to later Anglo-Saxon work. The style has also been related to late-Roman ring styles in finds such as the Thetford Hoard.

Seiichi Suzuki defines the style through an analysis of its design organisation, and, by comparing it with near-contemporary styles in Britain and on the continent, identifying those features which make it unique. He suggests that the quoit brooch style was made and remade as part of the process of construction of new group identities during the political uncertainties of the time, and sets the development of the style in the context of the socio-cultural dynamics of an emergent post-Roman society. The brooch shows that culture was not just transposed from the continent, but from an early phase a new "Anglo-Saxon" culture was being developed.

In late Roman Gaul and Britain cingula or belts decorated with metal fittings were worn as signs of rank by both soldiers and civilian officials. One theory is that the style was produced by goldsmiths trained in late Roman provincial traditions working for Germanic clients, certainly after and perhaps also before the departure of the Roman legions and the end of Roman rule in Britain in 410 or thereabouts. The style and forms are very different from contemporary continental Germanic ones, and the contexts of the various finds seem to allow for both the possibilities that Germanic owners were adopting some Romano-British cultural habits, and that Romano-British owners of objects were adopting partially Anglo-Saxon ones in the first years of the Anglo-Saxon settlement of Britain.

The discovery of an increasing number of important products of the Quoit Brooch ″school″ in northern France, however, shows that neither the style, nor the forms of jewellery are purely insular developments and that they cannot be linked with any particular ethnic group. An alternative theory has therefore been advanced that they are associated with broadly Germanic, mercenary or federate forces employed in the defence of both southern Britain and northern Gaul in the 5th century, who identified themselves and their status by the creation of innovative metalwork in late Roman tradition.

== Finds ==
The Sarre Brooch, found in the Sarre Anglo-Saxon cemetery at Sarre, Kent in 1863, and now in the British Museum is the best-known example, in a very good state of preservation. It was described by Gale Owen-Crocker as the "most magnificent example" of the Quoit brooch style. Two three-dimensional doves sit on the flat circle of the brooch, and another on the head of the pin. In silver with the two zones of animal ornament gilded, it is 7.71 cm across. It was bought by the British Museum in 1893, having once been in the museum of Henry Durden of Blandford. This and a brooch from Howletts, Grave 13 are so similar that they are thought to be from the same workshop, if not the same artist, although several workshops are thought to have worked in the Quoit Brooch Style.

The brooches, the belt-fittings and the style, are mainly found in high-status burials in southern-eastern England, south of the Thames, and right across northern France, dating from the middle quarters of the 5th century. The British Museum also has a fragment of a brooch similar to the Sarre one from Howletts, Kent, and several belt-fittings in the style from the Anglo-Saxon cemetery at Mucking in Essex, as well as pieces excavated at Chessell Down on the Isle of Wight and Howletts in Kent. The brooch shape survived beyond that, but in a much plainer style.

Given its limited range in time and place, the style is rare, and one survey in 2000 identified only 5 round brooches (counting style of decoration rather than shape) and a maximum of 39 objects in the style, though the total must be revised upwards in light of the French evidence and in the same year Peter Inker described and illustrated 7 round brooches. One significant addition to the corpus was found near Winchester in 2013 and registered by the Portable Antiquities Scheme. This was a "large fragment of a 5th century copper alloy scabbard mount with silver inlay" with a crouching animal, and part of its confronted partner, projecting above a zone with geometric rosettes to form the upper edge of the scabbard.

== Debate ==
The style was identified in the 20th century and initially provoked much debate as to its origins. It is often connected with the Jutes, who Bede said settled in the core area of the finds, and "barbarian" continental influences, Germanic and Frankish are often also seen in the style, which has also been called "Jutish Style A" by Sonia Hawkes.
