= Walkington Wold burials =

Burial site

Plan of the Walkington Wold burials.

The Walkington Wold burials in the East Riding of Yorkshire, England, comprise the skeletal remains of 13 individuals from the Anglo-Saxon period which were discovered in the late 1960s, during the excavation of a Bronze Age barrow. Subsequent examinations have concluded that they were decapitated Anglo-Saxon criminals, and that the site is the most northerly of its kind known in England.

== Original excavation ==
Walkington Wold skeletal remains.

Archaeologists Rod Mackey and John Bartlett discovered the burials while excavating the Bronze Age barrow at Walkington Wold, about 2 kilometres (1.25 miles) west of the Yorkshire village of Walkington, from 1967 to 1969. Twelve skeletons were unearthed, ten of which were without skulls, though eleven skulls were also found, most of which were without jawbones. All were buried randomly, though three appeared to have been buried together, with most of the skulls well away from the bodies. Some of the skulls were found at the centre of the barrow mound, while the bodies were all located at the perimeter. Theories of their identity included victims of a late Roman massacre, Anglo-Saxon executions, or even a Celtic head cult.

== Re-evaluation ==
The skeletons were re-examined in 2007 by archaeologists Jo Buckberry from Bradford University and Dawn Hadley from Sheffield University. It was revealed that in fact 13 individuals were unearthed in the late 1960s, all had been aged between 18 and 45, and, while eight of the skeletons and nine of the skulls were identified as certainly male, none were identified as female. Radiocarbon dating showed that the remains range from the mid 7th century to the early 11th century. It also indicated that the apparent "triple burial" in fact consisted of separate burials in the same location. Examination of the skeletons revealed that their owners were subjected to judicial execution by decapitation, one of which required several blows. Furthermore, the heads were probably displayed on poles as warnings to others, which was a known practice in Anglo-Saxon England. While the burial site is ideally situated for public display on a rise by a road, the absence of jawbones from most of the skulls suggests that they fell off as the heads decomposed on the poles.

The crimes of the men are unknown, owing to the lack of any associated documentation. The burial site is between Walkington and the deserted village of Hunsley, adjacent to the modern hamlet of High Hunsley, at the boundary of the then hundreds of Welton and Cave. The use of an ancient barrow site situated on the boundaries between communities indicates that the executed were excluded from the community, even in death. According to Mackey, the site had been known locally as "'Hell's Gate' – suggesting there was a folk memory [from] when it was used as an execution site."

== Significance ==
Walkington Wold excavation site.

While Walkington Wold is "unusual in being the most northerly example yet found of an Anglo-Saxon execution cemetery", the site contributes evidence that such execution cemeteries were used periodically over a long time, being established long before their first documentation in the 10th century, and that men, rather than women, tended to be executed for crimes in mid to late Anglo-Saxon England. It also demonstrates continuity over a period which includes the upheavals of Scandinavian invasion and settlement.

The selection of a Bronze Age barrow for the burials fits a pattern of Anglo-Saxon re-use of ancient barrows and mounds. Such barrows were thought to be the haunt of dragons, goblins and the like, and the executed criminals at Walkington Wold, excluded from normal human society by their criminal activity and subsequent executions, were made outcasts in death by their association with such spirits.

== See also ==
- List of Anglo-Saxon cemeteries
- Bed burial
- List of Anglo-Saxon bed burials
