= Post-excavation analysis =

Processes for studying archaeological materials after an excavation

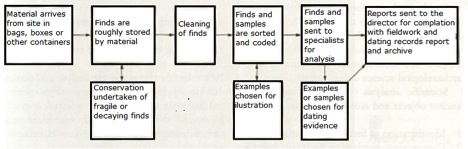
Diagram describing major steps in post-excavation analysis

Post-excavation analysis constitutes processes that are used to study archaeological materials after an excavation is completed. Since the advent of "New Archaeology" in the 1960s, the use of scientific techniques in archaeology has grown in importance. This trend is directly reflected in the increasing application of the scientific method to post-excavation analysis. The first step in post-excavation analysis should be to determine what one is trying to find out and what techniques can be used to provide answers. Techniques chosen will ultimately depend on what type of artifact(s) one wishes to study. This article outlines processes for analyzing different artifact classes and describes popular techniques used to analyze each class of artifact. Keep in mind that archaeologists frequently alter or add techniques in the process of analysis as observations can alter original research questions.

In most cases, basic steps crucial to analysis (such as cleaning and labeling artifacts) are performed in a general laboratory setting while more sophisticated techniques are performed by specialists in their own labs. The sections of this article describe specialized techniques and section descriptions assume that artifacts have already been cleaned and cataloged.

== Inorganic remains ==
=== Pottery studies ===
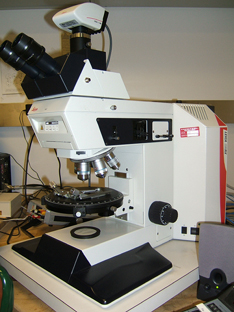
An incident light microscope used for petrology

Pottery survives well in nearly all environments. It provides dating evidence and is also used to make inferences about exchange, economy and social dynamics. The Munsell color system is used to categorize colors of shards, while other aspects such as grain size and hardness are examined using other charts. Information on the process of manufacturing can also be rendered from pottery. Petrology studies characteristics of rocks, which are often used as temper in different forms of pottery. By studying temper in more detail, pottery can be sourced to specific manufacturers or geographic locations. Petrology can also inform studies of manufacturing techniques. Petrological techniques can be applied to pottery and bricks. However, 'fingerprinting' clay sources is much more difficult with certain artifact types with more ambiguous origins than others. Re-firing experiments and ethnology can also provide clues to fabric color and hardness, which inform understandings of manufacturing techniques.

There is debate as to whether the number or weight of shreds is more useful when quantifying the use of pottery on a particular site. Some archaeologists find it useful to employ a quantification method popular in faunal analysis. Instead of measures of Minimum Number of Individuals, pottery analysis sometimes employs Minimum Vessel Counts. This type of analysis uses the number of representative parts to extrapolate the number of complete objects in an assemblage. Though this can be problematic at times, it does give a good measure of the relative proportion and distribution of artifacts on a given site.

Various specific methods can be used to date clay tobacco pipes, as trends in their shape have been found that can allow reasonably accurate correlation between the shape and the time period in which the pipe was produced.

=== Stone tools analysis ===
Stone tools are frequently the subject of archaeological analyses as they exhibit exceptional preservation and are often the most numerous artifact at early prehistoric sites. In some early sites, stone tools are the only sign of human activity. The category of stone tools not only contains finished tools, but also cores (large chunks of rock from which pieces are broken off to make tools) and flakes (material that is wasted when making a tool). One technique used to analyze stone tools is categorization. Categorization organizes observations into “a limited set of groupings that can be said to be alike in a defined way.” Categorization can either be achieved by:

1. using a set of variables to allocate artifacts to classes or
2. using statistics and artifact data to find natural groups (or clusters) in the assemblage.

Factors measured include, but are not limited to, size, shape, level of reduction, color, raw material, and technological or typological category. Archaeologists must make decisions about how to measure these factors in order to achieve the highest possible level of objectivity.

The surfaces of stone tools are often the subject of much attention. The examination of surfaces give clues as to how tools were made. Typical design techniques include: fracturing, pecking or polishing. Sometimes, stone tools are continually modified and keen attention to surfaces is necessary to recognize each stage of the manufacture process.

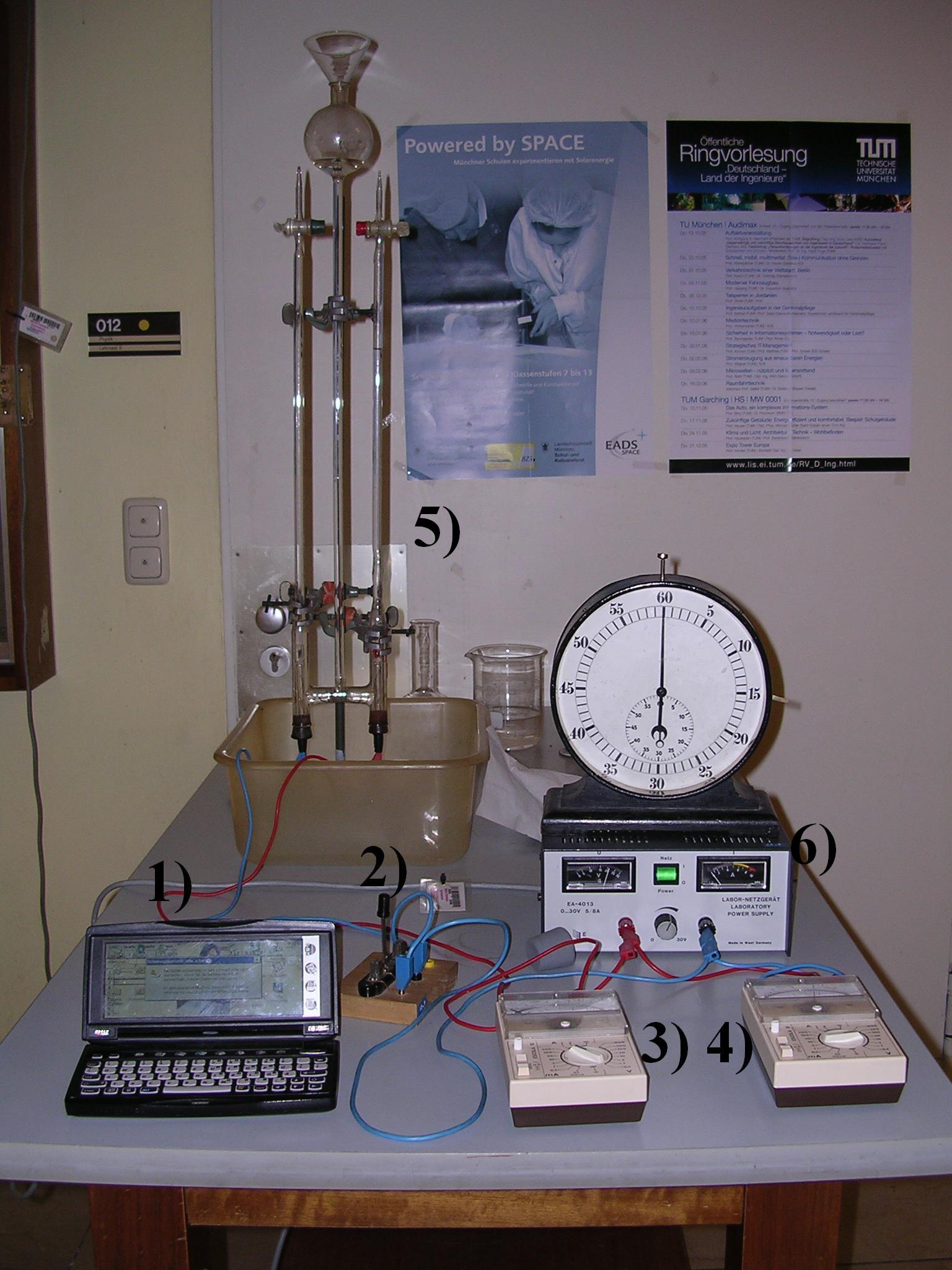
An example of a lab station set up for electrolysis

=== Metallurgical analysis ===
Before analysis begins, metal artifacts require intensive cleaning. Since these cleaning methods are more specialized than those used to clean other artifact types and are necessary for analysis to occur, they are worth mentioning in this section.

Electrolysis is used to treat metals to prevent deterioration before being analyzed by archaeologists. For example, metals from shipwrecked sites can have encrustation, which means they contain coagulates. The combined mineral load of the ocean reacts with corroding metals and surrounding sediments to form a dense layer around the metal. The encrustation minerals, the objects it surrounds, and the techniques for preservation are recorded using photographs and x rays.

Once metals are cleaned, metallurgists use microscopes to examine minute details of the metals in order to reveal information regarding composition and manufacturing techniques. For example, the artifact shape, cracks, and places where pieces of metal were joined together can be identified. Additionally, one garner information pretianing to casting errors, mould seams and decorative work. Metallography exams the size and shape of the grains of minerals in the materials for traces of heating, working and alloying. Scanning electron microscopes are also utilized to explore manufacturing techniques used for jewellery and weapons making. This is because they enable fine detail to be identified, such as when they examine the hammering of folded layers of metal to create a sword. Additionally the identification of the marks of the tools that were used to make the artifact can inform studies of manufacturing techniques. Also, other techniques are used to identify types of metals. For example, Atomic absorption spectroscopy is used to identify alloys of gold, bronze and copper. However, this is not as effective if an artifact contains multiple types of metals.

== Organic remains ==
=== Human remains ===
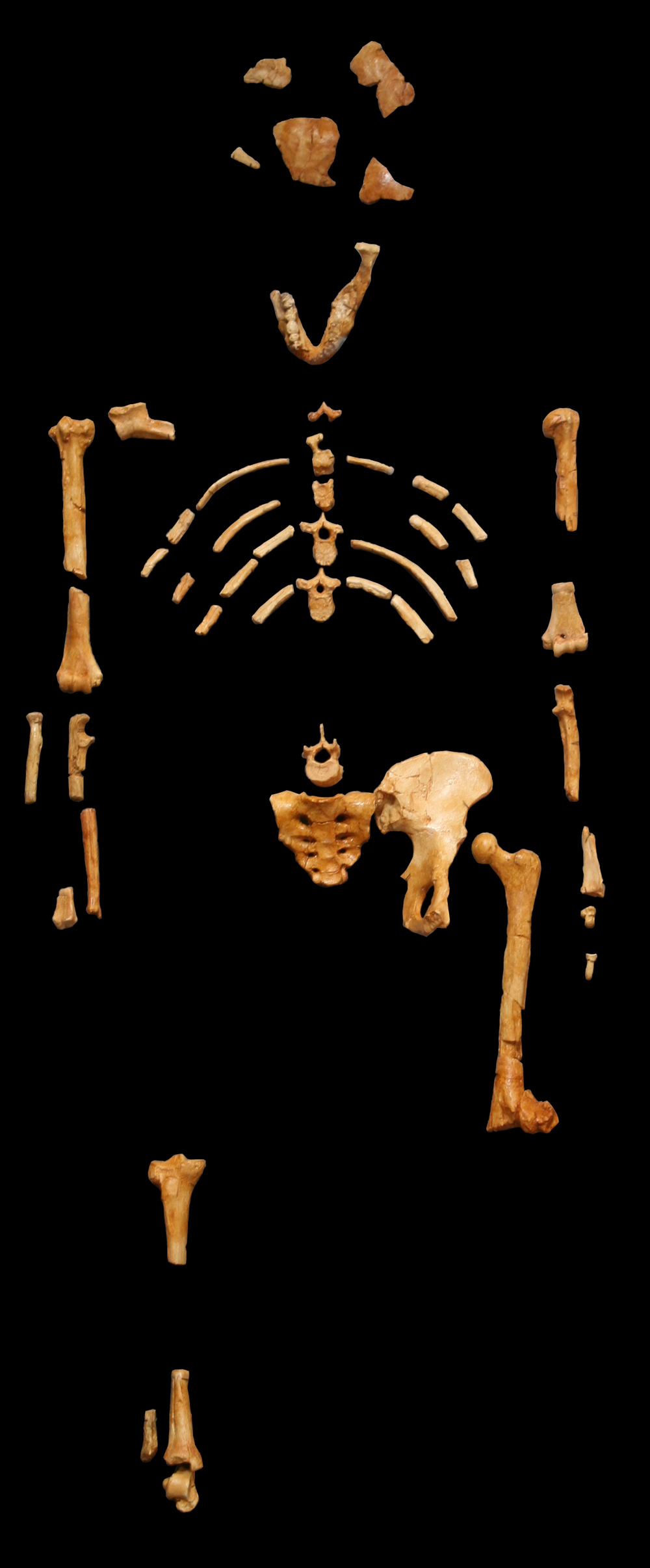
Cast of cleaned remains of Lucy, a famous Australopithecus afarensis specimen found in Ethiopia

Skeletal remains can be analyzed for sex, age at death, and stature. However, there are different processes for analyzing these factors when dealing with adults and subadults.

In regards to identifying sex, the sex of subadults can be measured by comparing the stage of calcification in the teeth with the maturation of the postcranial skeleton. Postcranial skeletons mature slower in boys than girls, whereas the rate of calcification in teeth is about the same for both sexes. If dental and postcranial development is similar, the skeleton is likely male but if they are not, the individual is likely female. In adults, sex is determined by the size and function-related shape of the skeleton, particularly when examining the pelvis, sciatic notch, auricular area, preauricular area, acetabulum, pubis, long bones, and cranium.

Estimating age at death for adults involves observing morphological features in the skeletal remains, comparing the information with changes recorded for recent populations of known age. With subadults, the development of teeth, length of long bones, and union of epiphyses are used to estimate age. With adults, age is measured through macroscopic and microscopic methods. Macroscopic methods do not involve destruction of the specimen while microscopic methods are more time intensive and require equipment, some destruction, and specialized knowledge. Despite some disadvantages, microscopic methods give more accurate results.

By measuring the lengths of relevant bones, adding a factor for the non-bone contribution, and comparing them to historical numbers, one can estimate the stature of a skeleton.

=== Faunal analysis ===
Faunal remains are considered to include both fish, birds, and mammals. These remains are used to reconstruct past environments and identify how animals impacted human economies. The study of ancient animal remains is referred to as zooarchaeology. Once bones are collected, cleaned, and labeled, specialists begin to identify the type of bone and what species the bone came from. The number of identified bones are counted as well as the weight of each sample and the minimum number of individuals. The age and sex of an animal can be used to determine information about hunting and agriculture. The sex of bones can be identified from anatomical features such as antlers with respect to deer. Biostratigraphy is the principle of using fossil animals to date layers, and by extension, sites. Faunal remains also provide information into human behavior and trade or human migration.

=== Mollusks/invertebrate analysis ===
Invertebrates can provide evidence of the local environment and human activity. Beetles can be found in most environments and are often grouped into habitat or food preferences. Through using beetles, information such as ground surface conditions, vegetation and climate, and stored products and plant utilization can be found. Land snails, freshwater snails, clams, and marine mollusks can also serve as indicators for food consumption, construction, and the production of lime and dye.

Land snail shells range from microscopic to large. They are usually classified into three broad size groups. The presence of land snails on a site may indicate human consumption, rodent activity, environmental conditions, or human collection due to their special features.

Regardless of type, all mollusk shells should be collected using a standardized stratigraphic sampling strategy. Utilizing this type of strategy avoids the problem of ignoring the collection of smaller shells, an issue that can result from hand-picking. Once samples are collected, they must be sent to a laboratory to be air-dried. A standard weight is then collected for each sample. Each standardized sample is then placed in a plastic bowl (labeled with stratigraphic information) and covered with hot water. Shells float to the top and are skimmed off into a set of sieves, which separate the shells by size. After shells are removed from the soil, the soil should be covered in a solution of 70% hot water and 30% hydrogen peroxide. Once the mixture fizzes, it is passed through a set of sieves. Both the soil and shells are then placed in the drying oven. After cooling, shells are fully prepared for analysis and can be extracted from the sieves.

In analyzing mollusk shells, archaeologists focus on many factors, including: taxonomy, mineral composition of the shell, and organic matter remaining in the shell. For example, the presence of carbonate minerals suggests that the pH of the sediment on a site has always been above 8. pH measures can then be used to interpret the environmental conditions of a particular site before, during, and after its occupation.

=== Botanical analysis ===
==== Macrobotanical remains ====
Botanical remains can give information about past climate, economic practices and changes within the environment. Macrobotanical remains (also known as plant microfossils) are specimens that are visible to naked eye and are preserved through the following conditions:

- Waterlogging
- Carbonization
- Mineralization
- Freezing
- Impressions in Mudbrick or Pottery

In order to analyze a macrobotanical assemblage, several steps may be taken. First, charred and waterlogged macrobotanical remains must be separated from soil by a process known as flotation. Mineralized remains and remains from extremely dry contexts can usually be separated from soil and roots with careful dry sieving alone. Although flotation systems differ in size, design, and number of components in order to meet the needs of the assemblage and the restrictions of the site, each system accomplishes the same basic task. Passing water over a soil sample separates the remains into light and heavy fractions. The heavy fraction weighs more than water and, thus, sinks to the bottom and is collected in a screen. The light fraction, which contains the plant remains, floats above the water and is sorted onto another, finer screen. Residual dirt and water are drained out of the unit through an output valve. Light and heavy fractions are then dried to prepare them for analysis.

Analysis varies depending on what questions are asked of the material. Typically, light fractions are sorted through a series of sieves. Next, remains left in each sieve are sorted by taxa with use of a microscope. Finally, data organization and multivariable analysis are completed as needed.

==== Phytoliths ====
Phytoliths are another botanical material that can be analyzed. Minerals produced by plants, phytoliths provide a unique perspective on the archaeobotanical record. Phytoliths, and siliceous phytoliths in particular, are the most durable biogenic plant material in archaeological sites. The high degree of phytolith preservation is due in part to their structure. Each phytolith is almost completely composed of silica with less than 0.03% organic material. The process to analyzing phytoliths includes several, well-standardized steps:

1. Organic matter must be removed. This is typically accomplished by heating hydrogen peroxide to 70 degrees Celsius. Hydrogen peroxide is known to effectively remove organic matter without damaging the phytoliths below.
2. Phytoliths must be concentrated using density centrifugation. Sodium polytungstate is a common substance used to aid in this process. After the centrifuge stops, dense particles are at the bottom of the test tube, sodium polytungstate is in the middle, and phytoliths sit on top of the liquid as they are lighter than the liquid itself. Although this process seems straightforward, it should be modified to serve the needs of each individual sample.
3. Washing and drying of the sample yields an “almost pure” collection of phytoliths. Around 1 milligram of this sample is portioned into an aliquot which is then placed on a microscope slide. The sample should always be properly weighed and examined immediately to avoid crystallization of the phytoliths, which would affect one's ability to count them.
4. Phytoliths are counted. It is not necessary to count the entire slide. Rather, it is preferable to count a specified portion of the slide in order to more easily determine the number of the phytoliths on the entire slide. The paleoethnobotanist must use discretion when counting in order to properly account for the presence of unicellular and multicellular phytoliths. The goals of the analysis will largely determine how phytoliths are counted.
5. Errors in phytolith concentration and identification are accounted for.

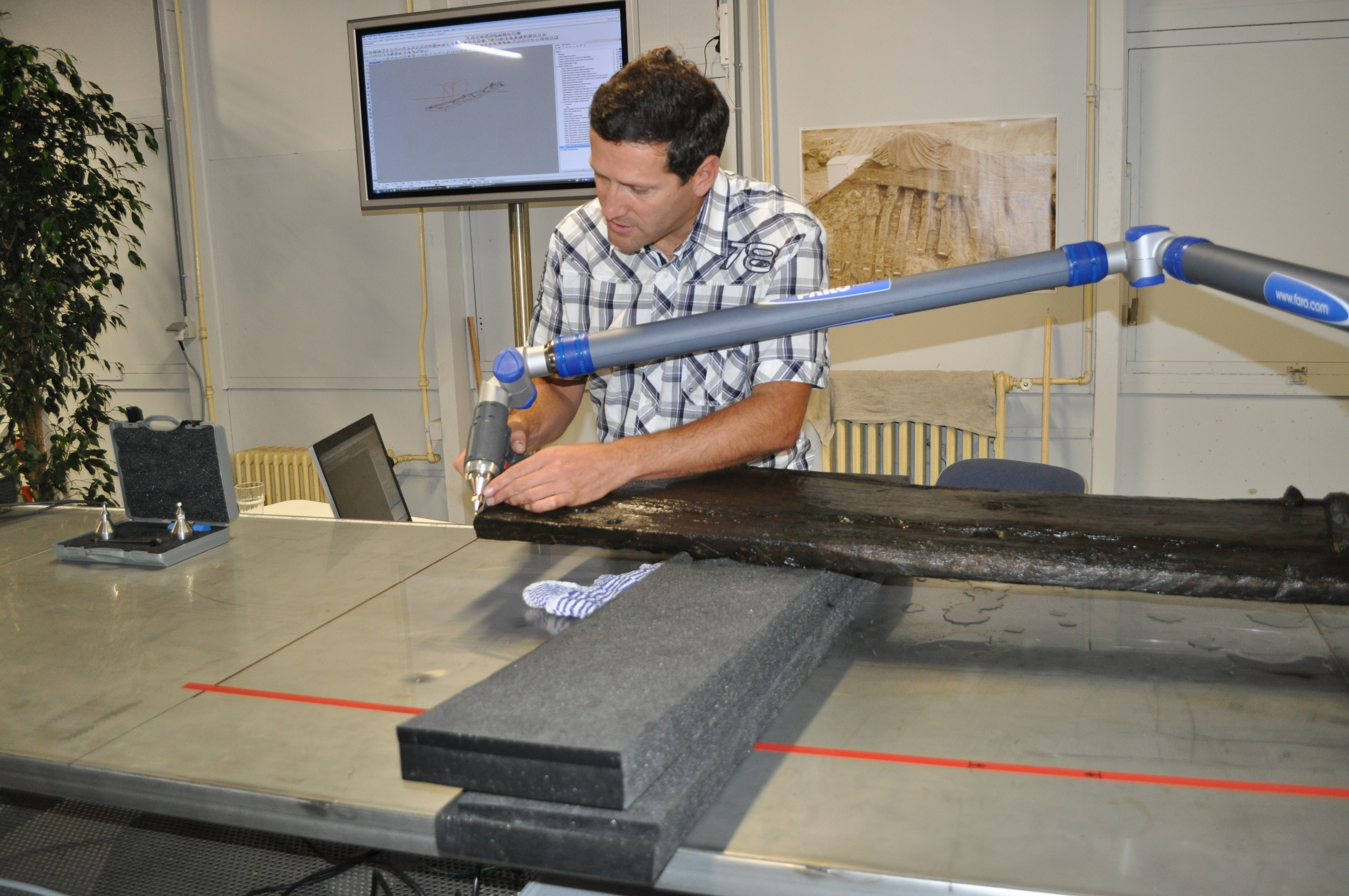
A specialist uses a faro arm to examine a specimen of archaeological wood.

==== Wood ====
Wood can serve as physical evidence for structure. Wooden artifacts can also indicate other ways in which wood was utilized in the past. After wood is extracted from its primary context, it is important to store it in conditions similar to that context. If it is stored in different conditions, distortion of the wood may occur which could alter the results of analysis. Many times, wet wood can be more useful than dry as dry wood can warp.

==== Pollen ====
In simple terms, palynology is the study of pollen. Pollen have specific shapes, so the species is easily identifiable and can provide a record of environmental change and pollen dating. Diatoms are microscopic single celled plants that can be found in or near water. By studying diatoms, changes such as deforestation and pollution can be determined. Phytoliths are silica from the cells of plants that can survive in alkaline soils.

Analysis of all of the previous types of botanical remains is typically completed by specialists that study paleoethnobotany. Paleoethnobotanists examine various types of archaeological evidence to study relationships between people and plants. These specialists not only study how and why people used plants, but also ways in which uses change over time and space.

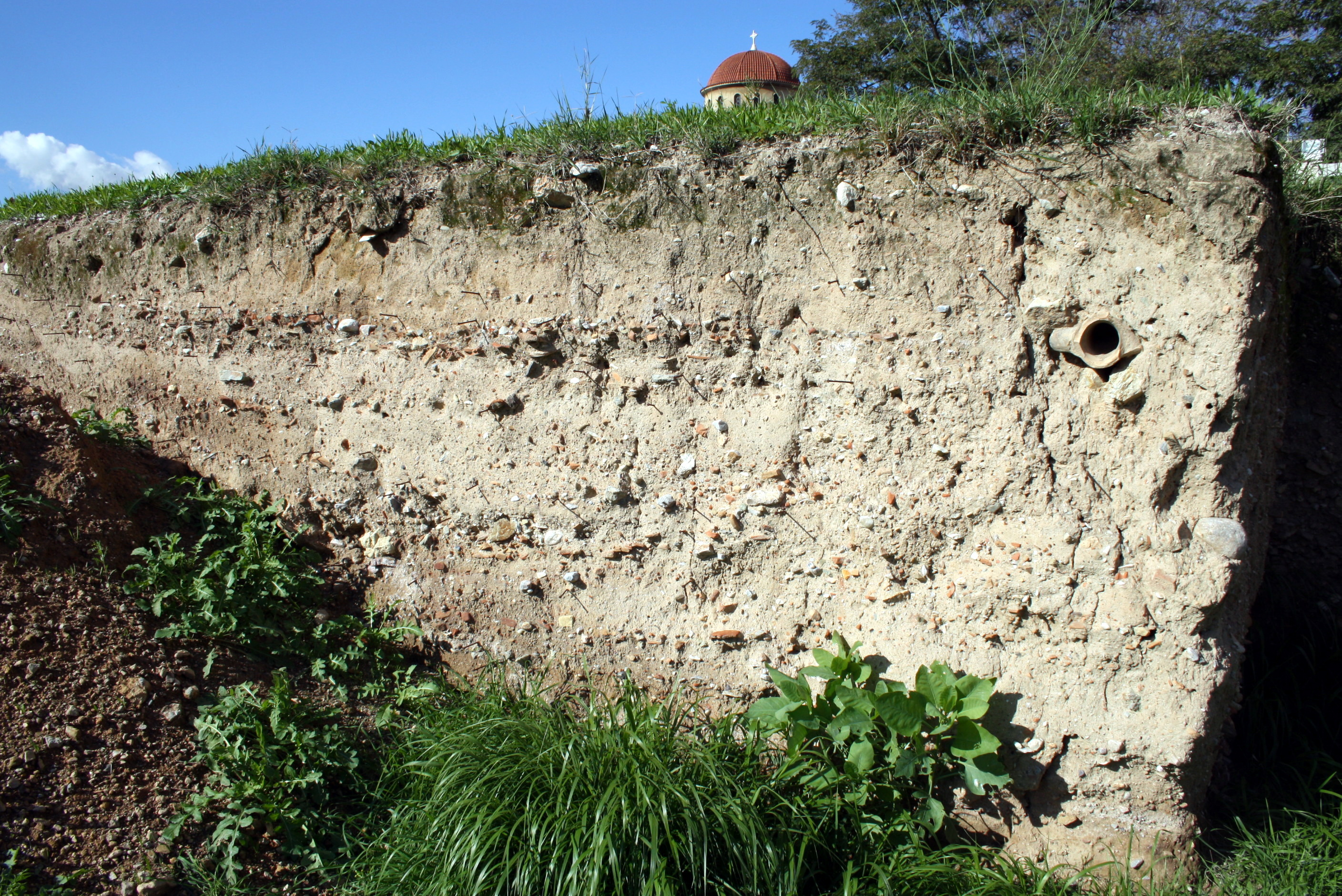
Photograph of a soil profile at the Keramikos archaeological site, Athens, Greece

=== Sediment analysis ===
Sediments can provide clues to reconstructing past natural and cultural processes in a similar manner as artifacts. Professionals that study geoarchaeology are trained to use changes in soils and geomorphology to interpret human behavior. By analyzing sediments, archaeologists can gather information regarding site chronology, supplement field descriptions, and test hypotheses related to site formation and function. Laboratories of sediments tend to focus on studying mineralogy, micromorphology, granulometry, pH, organic matter, calcium carbonate, and phosphorus levels. As with any material, specific methods used will depend on questions one is asking of the material. For example, both petrography and x-ray diffraction can be used to examine mineralogy, but the choice of method will depend on the specific minerals one aims to detect.

== Other considerations ==
=== Ethnohistoric sources and small artifacts ===
After excavations are complete, sometimes archaeologists need to use additional sources of evidence to form new conclusions or complement findings derived from the most common artifact types. Additional sources include small artifacts and historical documents. Small artifacts, such as clay tobacco pipes, can be used to date sites. In the case of tobacco pipes, bore diameters are measured and then averaged and compared with a table of diameters to indicate a probable site date. Historical sources can be examined to provide more context for site activities. One must be careful not to base interpretations of a site on historical sources, but to use them to complement or contradict trends examined in the archaeological material alone. Just as one must take care when interpreting the results of archaeological analyses, one must also be careful when determining the weight of historical documents in forming conclusions about a site. The analyst must ask questions such as: Who was this document written by? What was his or her sociocultural position? What factors may skew his or her interpretations?
