= Bed burial =

7th-century Anglo-Saxon burial practice

A bed burial is a type of burial in which the deceased person is buried in the ground, lying upon a bed. It is a burial custom that is particularly associated with high-status women during the early Anglo-Saxon period (7th century), although excavated examples of bed burials are comparatively rare.

== Anglo-Saxon bed burials ==
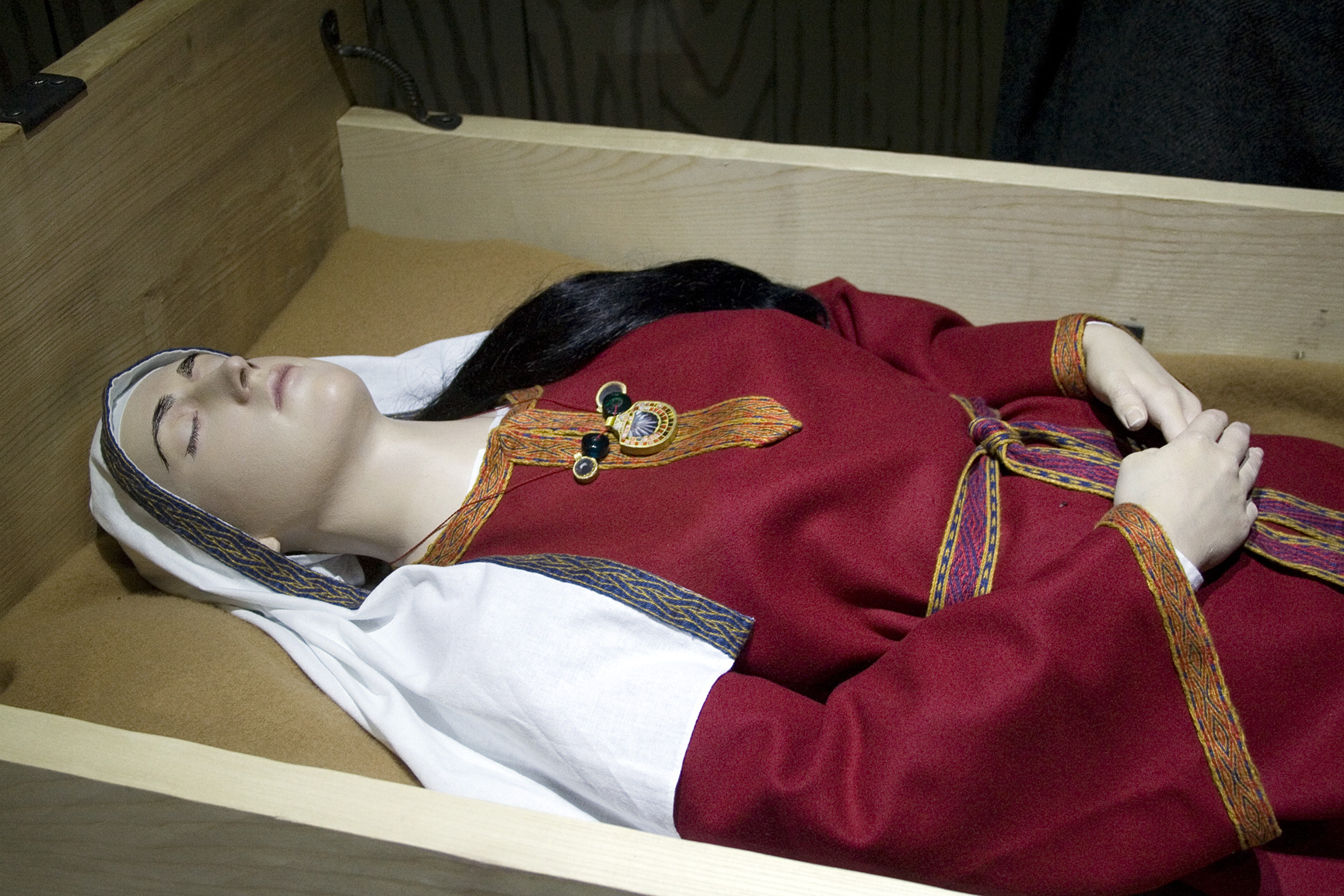
Replica of the "Saxon Princess" bed burial at the Street House Anglo-Saxon cemetery

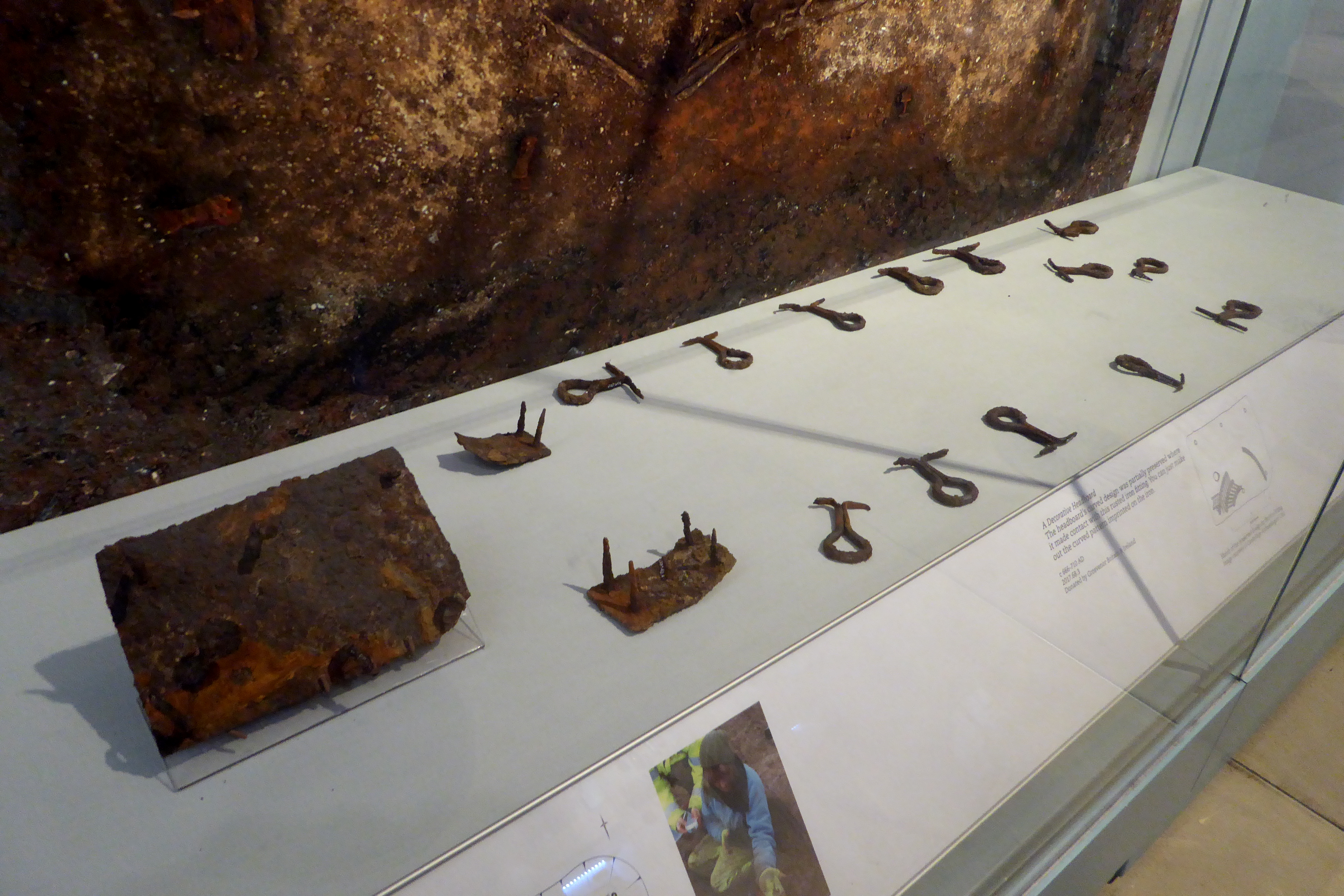
Iron fittings from the Trumpington bed burial displayed in the Museum of Archaeology and Anthropology in Cambridge

A number of early Anglo-Saxon bed burials, almost all dating to the 7th century, have been found in England, predominantly in the southern counties of Cambridgeshire, Suffolk and Wiltshire, but single examples have also been found in Derbyshire and North Yorkshire. The beds used in these burials were made of wood, and although none have been fully preserved, their presence can be inferred from the presence of iron fixtures and fittings, such as nails, cleats, grommets, brackets, headboard mounts and railings, that outline the rectangular shape of the bed in the grave. However, in some cases it is not clear whether the iron fixtures found in a grave come from a bed or a coffin.

The majority of the Anglo-Saxon bed burials are for young women, and many of the burials include items of jewellery and other grave goods that indicate that the dead person must have been wealthy and of high status during life. The high quality of the gold jewellery found in the bed burial at Loftus in Yorkshire suggests that the occupant of the grave may have been a princess. On the other hand, some of the young women buried on their beds have pectoral crosses or other Christian emblems buried with them (Ixworth, Roundway Down, Swallowcliffe Down, Trumpington, Harpole), which has suggested the possibility that they may have been abbesses, who in the early Anglo-Saxon period were recruited from noble families.

In addition to laying the deceased on a bed, some of the bed burials exhibit other features that mark them out as special, and relate them to ship burials, such as the bed being placed in a chamber (Coddenham, Swallowcliffe Down), or a barrow being raised above the grave (Lapwing Hill, Swallowcliffe Down). In at least two sites (Loftus and Trumpington), a grubenhaus (sunken-floored building) has been excavated close to the bed burial, and it is possible that the deceased was laid out in the grubenhaus before burial so that mourners could pay their respects to her.

The complex and elaborate funeral practices that must have been associated with a bed burial have been well described by archaeologist Howard Williams:

The artefacts, body and grave would have interacted to create a complex sequences of practices and performances in the funeral. We can imagine the digging of the grave, perhaps the lining of the grave with timber shorings, and perhaps a temporary shelter over the grave in the hours or days until the body is ready for burial. We then have the lowering of a bed into the grave, followed by the clothed body together with a set of discrete deposits. Each would have required persons approaching the grave and passing them down to those in the grave itself with the body. Finally, after the funeral had approached completion, the grave would have been back-filled and the mound raised.

Interring the deceased on a bed suggests that sleep was seen as a metaphor for death. Furthermore, the Old English word leger (modern English lair), literally meaning a "place where one lies", was used to refer to both beds and graves in Old English literature, which emphasises the symbolic equivalence of the bed and the grave.

=== List of Anglo-Saxon bed burials ===
About a dozen Anglo-Saxon bed burials, as well as several possible bed burials, have been excavated from the 19th century onwards, as listed in the table below.

Location	County	Coordinates	Year of discovery	Date	Notes
Cherry Hinton, Cambridge	Cambridgeshire	52.185°N 0.175°E	1949		One bed burial among a group of nine Anglo-Saxon graves.
Shrublands Quarry, Smythes Corner, Coddenham	Suffolk	52.140°N 1.115°E	2005	7th century	Bed burial of a woman, in a chambered grave, with high-status grave goods, including a pendant made from a gold coin with a prominent cross motif issued by the Frankish king Dagobert I (629–634), and three amethyst beads.
Collingbourne Ducis	Wiltshire	51.286°N 1.648°W	2007	Second half of the 7th century	Bed burial of a middle-aged woman aged about 45. The only object found in the grave was a single earthenware pot.
Edix Hill, Barrington	Cambridgeshire	52.131°N 0.011°E	1989–1991	7th century	Two bed burials. One of a young woman with leprosy aged 17–25, who was buried with a variety of personal effects, including a weaving sword, a knife, two silver rings, a bucket, and a box holding a key, a knife, a spindle whorl, a comb, a sea urchin fossil, and some sheep anklebones.
Harpole, near Northampton (Harpole bed burial)	Northamptonshire		2022	mid 7th century	Bed burial of a high-status woman in the early Christian church with significant associated jewellery.
Stanton, near Ixworth	Suffolk	52.320°N 0.875°E	1886	Mid 7th century	Bed burial with high-status grave goods, including a gold and garnet pectoral cross and a gold and garnet disc brooch.
Lapwing Hill, Brushfield	Derbyshire	53.240°N 1.765°W	1850	7th century	Bed burial, under a barrow, of a man buried with his weapons.
Street House Anglo-Saxon cemetery, near Loftus	North Yorkshire	54.563°N 0.858°W	2005–2007	Mid 7th century	Bed burial of a young woman, buried with a gold scutiform pendant, two cabochon garnet pendants, glass beads, pottery, iron knives, belt buckles and various other objects.
Roundway Down	Wiltshire	51.381°N 1.992°W	1840		Possibly a bed burial, although the iron mounts found in the grave may be from a coffin rather than a bed. Grave goods include a gold necklace inlaid with cabochon garnets, a veil fastener with two pins and a roundel decorated with a cross, and a wood and bronze bucket.
Shudy Camps, near Bartlow	Cambridgeshire	52.050°N 0.360°E	1933		Two, possibly three, bed burials.
Swallowcliffe Down	Wiltshire	51.025°N 2.037°W	1966	Second half of the 7th century	Bed burial of a young woman, constructed within a chamber built into a Bronze Age barrow. In the grave were found a large number of grave goods, including a wood and leather satchel embossed with an ornately decorated bronze and gold roundel with a cruciform design, an iron spindle, an iron pan, a bronze bucket, a silver sprinkler, two glass palm-cups, a bone comb, four silver brooches, 11 pendants from a necklace, and other items of jewellery and personal items in a box with bronze mountings.
Trumpington, Cambridge (Trumpington bed burial)	Cambridgeshire	52.172°N 0.105°E	2011	mid 7th century	Bed burial of a young woman, aged about 16, buried with a gold pectoral cross inlaid with garnets, an iron knife, a chatelaine, and some glass beads.
Winklebury Hill, near Shaftesbury	Wiltshire	50.995°N 2.070°W	1881		Possible bed burial.
Woodyates, near Salisbury	Dorset	50.965°N 1.965°W	1812		Possible bed burial, with grave goods including beads made out of gold, glass and jet.

== Viking bed burials ==
In several Viking ship burials from Norway and Sweden, including the Oseberg ship burial (dated to 834) and Gokstad ship burial (dated to the late 9th century), the deceased had been laid out on beds. However, true bed burials, in which the bed is buried directly in the ground are not known.

== Modern instances ==
In 1910, Morris Lofton was buried in Rose Cemetery of Tarpon Springs, Florida, in his iron bed frame, his only possession. It can still be seen in the cemetery today.

== See also ==
- Chamber tomb
