= Trumpington bed burial =

Early Anglo-Saxon burial of a young woman

- Location within Cambridgeshire
- 52°10′19″N 00°06′18″E
- Type: Tomb
- Periods: Anglo-Saxon
- Location: Trumpington, Cambridgeshire, England, United Kingdom

Site notes
- Excavation dates: 2011

The Trumpington bed burial is an early Anglo-Saxon burial of a young woman, dating to the mid-7th century, that was excavated in Trumpington, Cambridgeshire, England in 2011. The burial is significant both as an example of a bed burial, and because of the ornate gold pectoral cross inlaid with garnets that was found in the grave.

The finds from the burial are displayed in the Museum of Archaeology and Anthropology in Cambridge.

== Description ==
The occupant of the grave was a woman, aged about 16, who had moved from a region in southern Germany near the Alps shortly before her death. She was buried lying on a wooden bed (now decayed, but identifiable from its iron brackets). She was buried with a number of grave goods, including an iron knife, a chatelaine, and some glass beads that perhaps originally decorated a purse. An ornate gold pectoral cross was found on her breast. The cross, only 3.5 cm across, is inlaid with garnets, and would have been sewn onto the robe that she was wearing, as indicated by loops on the back of each arm of the cross.

== Archaeological context ==
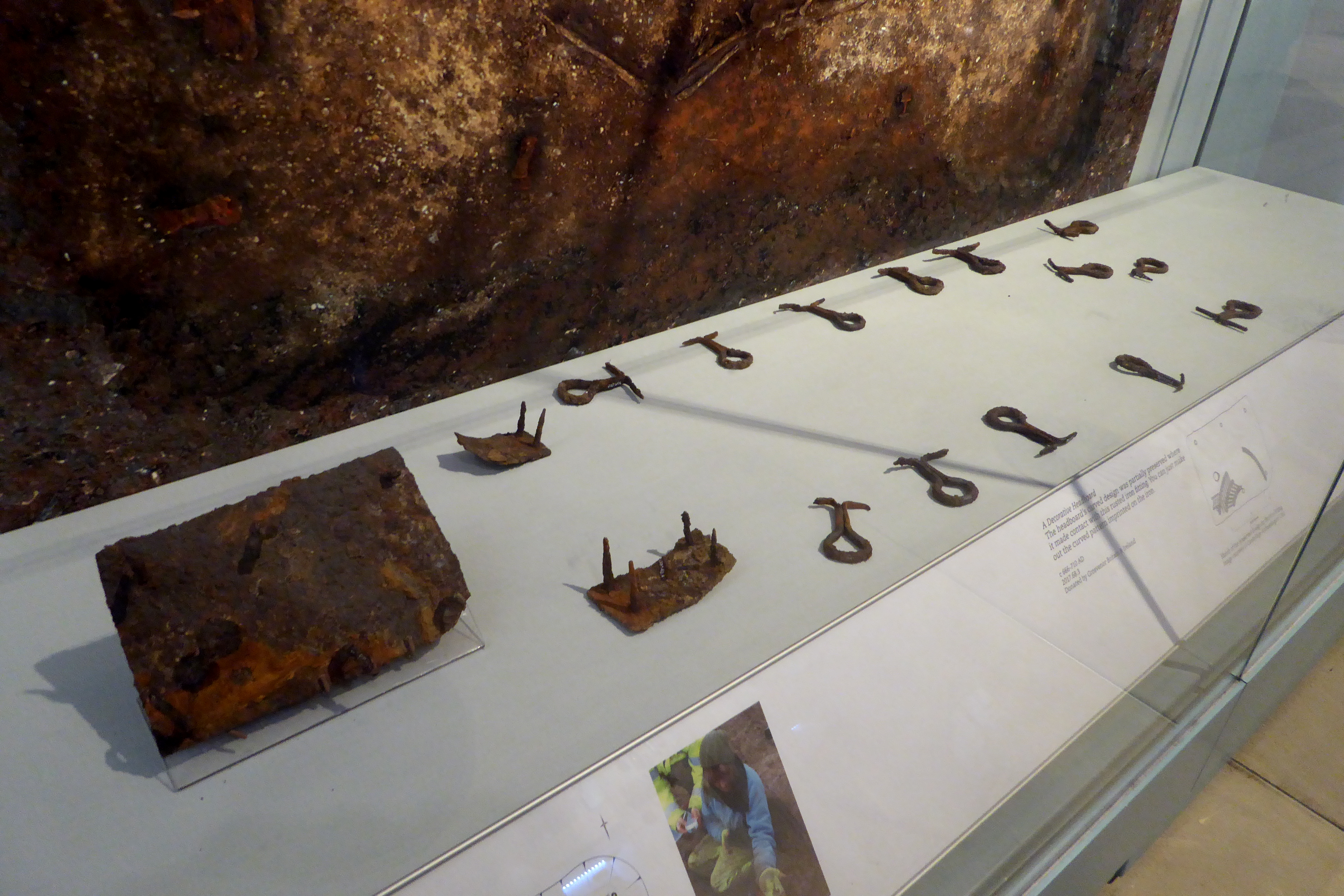
Iron fittings from the bed burial displayed in the Museum of Archaeology and Anthropology in Cambridge

The bed burial and three other Anglo-Saxon graves were discovered in summer 2011 as part of a series of archaeological excavations carried out by the Cambridge Archaeological Unit of the University of Cambridge in Trumpington Meadows, on the outskirts of the village of Trumpington, within the city of Cambridge, prior to the redevelopment of the land for housing. The excavations uncovered a variety of features from a long period of time, including two long barrows dating to the early Neolithic, a double burial dating to the Beaker culture (the bodies belonged to a man and a woman, either maternal cousins or half-brother and sister according to DNA analysis), and an Iron Age settlement. The Anglo-Saxon graves and other Anglo-Saxon features, including sunken floored buildings, were discovered in a field north of the meadows. Of the three other graves, two were also of young women, but none of them were bed burials or contained any grave goods. It is thought that the buildings and graves must be associated with a settlement, perhaps a monastic community, although no early Anglo-Saxon settlement was previously known to exist at Trumpington. Examples of 7th-century religious foundations for royal women include Barking Abbey, Essex for Saint Ethelburga and Minster in Thanet Priory, Kent founded for Saint Ermenburga.

== Significance ==
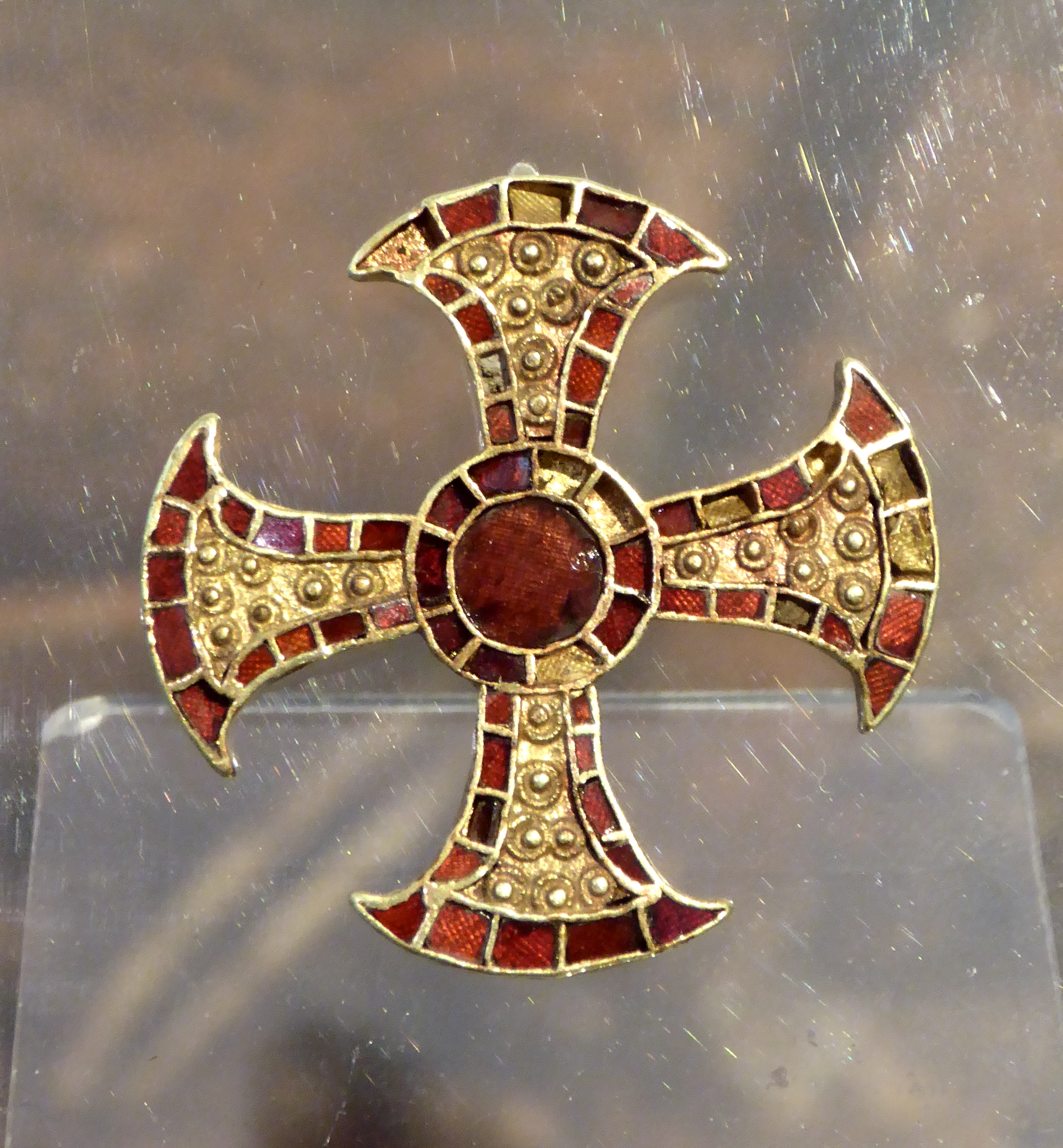
The Trumpington Cross

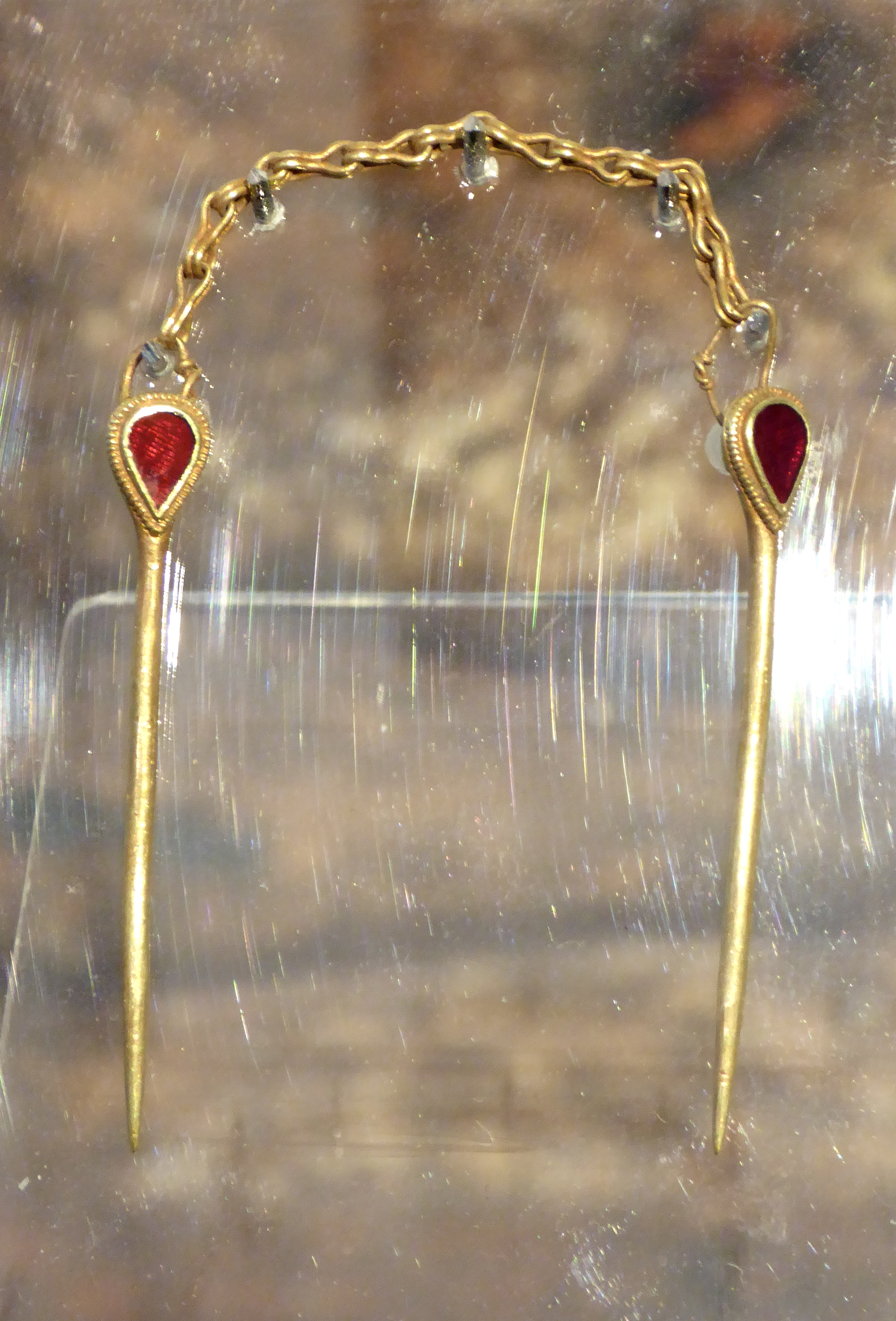
Gold and garnet pins from the burial

A small number of bed burials, no more than a dozen and mostly of women, are known from the Anglo-Saxon period, but they are comparatively rare. Other sites where bed burials have been excavated in recent years include Coddenham in Suffolk, Collingbourne Ducis in Wiltshire, and Loftus in North Yorkshire.

Anglo-Saxon jewelled gold pectoral crosses are also very uncommon, with only five similar examples known, including one on St Cuthbert's coffin. It is probable that the owner of this cross was a member of the Anglo-Saxon nobility or possibly even a member of one of the royal families. The only previously known case of a bed burial with a pectoral cross, discovered in the 19th century at Ixworth in Suffolk, was poorly documented, which makes this discovery particularly significant.

The cross indicates that the occupant of the grave was a Christian, but she was also buried with secular grave goods. Her burial is linked to two other female bed burials from the same period in Cambridgeshire which contain women with similar geographic origins. These women may have been a part of a trans-European movement of elite, Christian women in the late 7th century who were part of the early Christian church and conversion efforts sanctioned by the pope.

== Display ==
The finds from the burial are displayed in the Museum of Archaeology and Anthropology, University of Cambridge.

The Fitzwilliam Museum in Cambridge had hoped to acquire the pectoral cross once it had been valued by the Treasure Valuation Committee. However, the cross was donated to the Museum of Archaeology and Anthropology by the property developers Grosvenor in January 2018. The cross is thought to be worth more than £80,000.

== See also ==
- Harpole bed burial
- List of Anglo-Saxon cemeteries
- List of Anglo-Saxon bed burials
- Shrubland Hall Anglo-Saxon cemetery
