= 2011 in archaeology =

This page lists major events of 2011 in archaeology.

== Explorations ==
- January – Teams commence a survey of the World War II Auxiliary Units headquarters site at Coleshill on the Oxfordshire/Wiltshire border in England.

== Excavations ==
- Spring – Excavation of unused British escape tunnel "George" (c. September 1944) at the site of the Stalag Luft III camp in Żagań (present-day Poland) by a British team.
- Summer – Trumpington bed burial near Cambridge, England.
- Fortified early medieval settlement near Rhynie, Aberdeenshire, Scotland.
- Excavations at Craig Rhos-y-felin in the Preseli Hills of south-west Wales begin (continue to 2015).

== Publications ==
- Terry Hunt and Carl Lipo – The Statues That Walked: Unraveling the Mystery of Easter Island (Free Press).
- Robert Van De Noort – North Sea Archaeologies: a maritime biography 10,000 BC–AD 1500 (Oxford University Press).
- February 16 – Scientists from the Natural History Museum publish an analysis of human skulls from 14,700 years BP found at Gough’s Cave in Cheddar Gorge, England, around 1987, which they believe were deliberately fashioned into ritual drinking cups. Human bones butchered and discarded nearby also suggest the practice of cannibalism.
- March – Archaeologists writing in Science argue that 15,500 BP finds from near Austin, Texas, overturn the theory that the Clovis culture represents the earliest settlers in North America.

== Finds ==
- January 11 – An article in Journal of Archaeological Science reveals the discovery of the earliest known winemaking equipment in caves in Armenia, from 6,000 years BP.
- February 11 – Marine archaeologists from the United States National Oceanic and Atmospheric Administration announce the discovery of artefacts from the whaling ship Two Brothers which sank off the French Frigate Shoals atoll in the Northwestern Hawaiian Islands on February 11, 1823, under Captain George Pollard, Jr.
- March 10 – English archaeologists report finding one of the earliest complete Neolithic pots in the country on a housing development in Didcot. It is thought to be about 5,500 years old.
- March 25 – The discovery of the Jordan Lead Codices, a series of codices from a cave in Jordan, is announced. The books, which reportedly contain early Christian symbols are purportedly around 2,000 years old. The authenticity of the codices is doubted.
- May 17 – Discovery of the wrecks of SS Etruria and M.F. Merrick in Lake Huron.
- Summer – An Anglo-Saxon pectoral cross is discovered during excavation of the Trumpington bed burial near Cambridge, England.
- October – Excavators from Museum of London Archaeology first uncover remains of the Elizabethan Curtain Theatre in Shoreditch.
- October 19 – The discovery of the Port an Eilean Mhòir boat burial, the United Kingdom mainland's first fully intact Viking ship burial site, at Ardnamurchan in the western Scottish Highlands, is announced.
- December – The discovery of the wreck of World War I British J class submarine HMS J6 (sunk in a friendly fire incident in October 1918) by divers off the Northumberland Coast of England is announced.
- Maritime archaeology
  - Spanish merchant ship Nuestra Señora de Encarnación, sunk in 1681 at the mouth of Panama's Chagres River, is located by a team from Texas State University.
  - First dugout canoes from Must Farm Bronze Age settlement in The Fens of eastern England discovered.
  - Evidence is uncovered in East Timor showing that 42,000 years ago settlers had high-level maritime skills.

== Events ==
- February 11 – The Pergamon Museum in Berlin stages a major exhibition of reconstructed Neo-Hittite sculpture and other material from Max von Oppenheim's collection (largely destroyed in 1943).
- June – Mougins Museum of Classical Art in France opened.
- July – The site of Venta Icenorum in Norfolk, England, is taken into public ownership.
- August – Announcement that 2010 dive surveys suggest that a wreck found off the coast of County Donegal in Ireland is from the Spanish Armada.
- November – Teeth found in 1964 at Grotta del Cavallo in southern Italy are identified as the oldest known remains of European early modern humans.
- November 28 – Joint ICOMOS – TICCIH Principles for the Conservation of Industrial Heritage Sites, Structures, Areas and Landscapes ("Dublin Principles") adopted by the 17th ICOMOS General Assembly meeting in Paris.

== Deaths ==
- February 19 – Anson Rainey, American-born author and Professor Emeritus of Ancient Near Eastern Cultures and Semitic Linguistics at Tel Aviv University (born 1930).
- April 11 – Lewis Binford, American archaeologist known for his development of processual archaeology (born 1931).
- June 2 – Philip Rahtz, English archaeologist (born 1921).

== See also ==
- List of years in archaeology
