= Street House Anglo-Saxon cemetery =

Cemetery in North Yorkshire, England

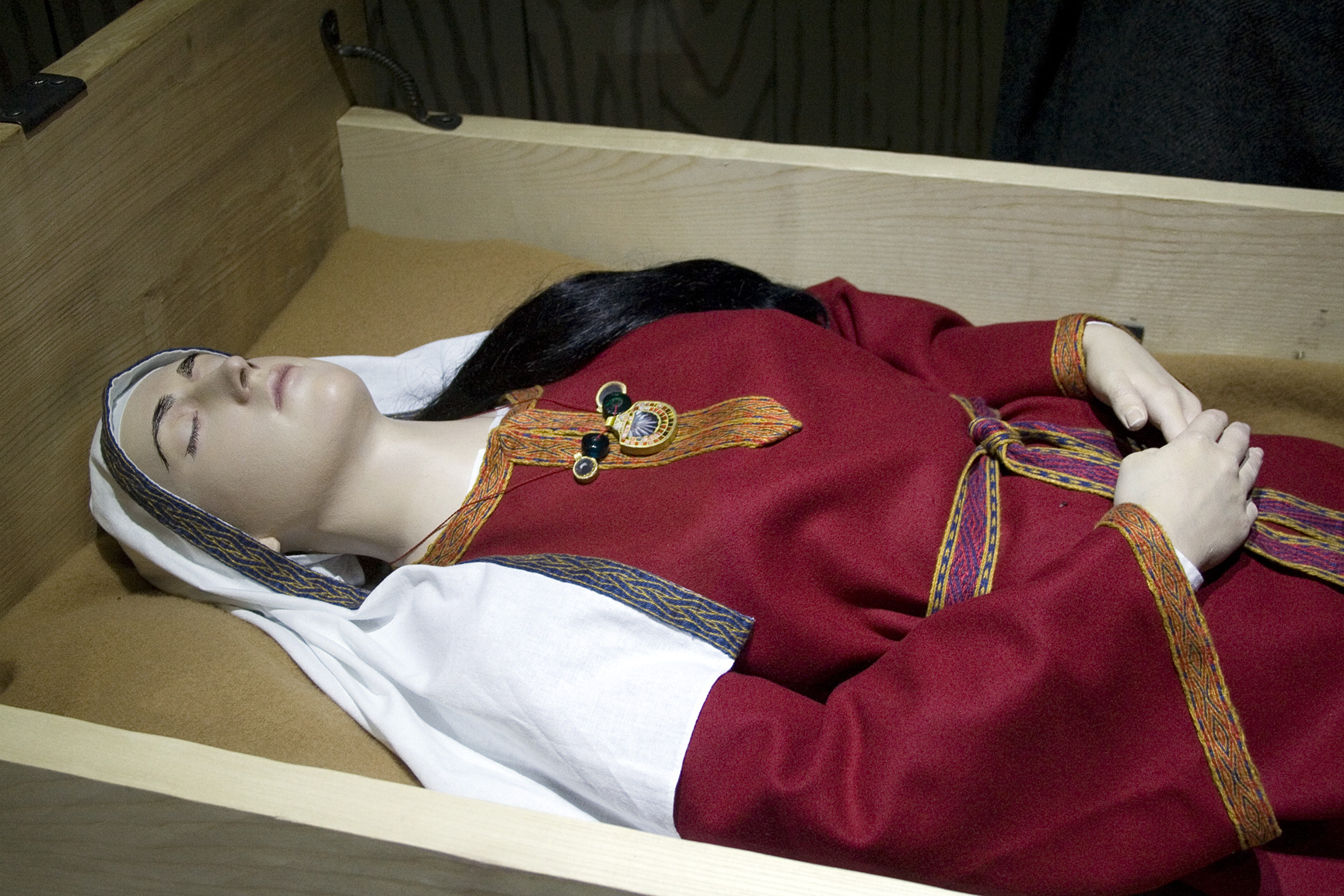
- Reconstruction from Kirkleatham Museum of the body of the Street House "Saxon Princess" in her bed

- Location within North Yorkshire
- 54°33′46″N 00°51′26″W
- Type: Necropolis
- Periods: Anglo-Saxon
- Location: Loftus, North Yorkshire, England

The Street House Anglo-Saxon cemetery is an Anglo-Saxon burial ground, dating to the second half of the 7th century AD, that was discovered at Street House Farm near Loftus, in the unitary authority of Redcar and Cleveland, England. Monuments dating back as far as 3300 BC are located in the vicinity of the cemetery, which was discovered after aerial photography revealed the existence of an Iron Age rectangular enclosure. The excavations, carried out between 2005 and 2007, revealed over a hundred graves dating from the 7th century AD and the remains of several buildings. An array of jewellery and other artefacts was found, including the jewels once worn by a young high-status Anglo-Saxon woman who had been buried on a bed and covered by an earth mound.

The woman's identity is unknown, but the artefacts and the layout of the cemetery are similar to finds in the east and south-east of England. There are contradictory indications of whether the occupants of the cemetery were Christian or pagan, as signs of both traditions are present. It perhaps represents a fusion of the two traditions during the "Conversion Period" when Christianity was taking hold among the Anglo-Saxons but pagan rituals had not yet been displaced, even among Christians. Archaeologists have suggested that the woman and at least some of the people buried around her may have migrated from the south, where bed burials were more common. They may all have been buried together within the space of a single generation, after which the cemetery was abandoned. The finds were acquired by Kirkleatham Museum, Redcar, in 2009 and have been on display there since 2011.

== Background ==
The vicinity of Street House Farm, located on Upton Hill to the north-east of the town of Loftus, has been known to archaeologists for some decades as an area of interest. An Early Neolithic long cairn and mortuary structure dating to about 3300 BC, on which a round barrow was built in the Early Bronze Age, was excavated over the course of three seasons between 1979 and 1981. In 1984, the archaeologist Blaise Vyner discovered the remains of an enigmatic structure that he dubbed the "Street House Wossit" (a contraction of "what-is-it"). This was a segmented circle of 56 wooden posts built around 2200 BC. In the centre of the structure, which was approximately 8 metres (26 ft) wide, were two D-shaped posts encircled by a raised stone bank. After a short period of usage the Wossit was dismantled and the posts burned. Its purpose is unknown but it is likely to have had some kind of religious or cultic significance.

== Excavations ==
One of those involved in the 1979–81 dig, archaeologist Steve Sherlock, decided to return to the site after aerial photographs revealed the presence of a rectangular Iron Age enclosure in the vicinity of the Bronze Age monuments. Initial excavations were carried out during ten days in September 2004. It was thought initially that the site was purely Iron Age or perhaps Romano-British. A more in-depth excavation was carried out in July 2005 after a geophysical survey revealed the existence of a large roundhouse, dating from the Iron Age, in the centre of the enclosure. The work revealed three roundhouses, several Iron Age ditches and a series of pits that were evidently graves. The latter came as a complete surprise and were found to date from the Anglo-Saxon period. Various artefacts dating to between 650 and 700 AD were excavated but no bones were recovered, as the acidic soil had destroyed any organic material long ago. Thirty graves were found during the initial excavation.

In 2006, the archaeologists returned to search for the settlement that they believed was associated with the graves. There are examples elsewhere, such as at Garton Green Lane Crossing in the Yorkshire Wolds, of 7th-century graves associated with prehistoric monuments, and it was initially thought that the Street House graves were a similar example. However, the excavation uncovered another twelve graves. It was realised that the cemetery was far larger than first thought, so the following year an archaeological survey of the entire site was attempted. A total of 109 graves was found by the end of the 2007 dig, forming a complex monument laid out in a unique square fashion around a central mound, a bed burial and a building that had possibly served as a mortuary.

Further excavations were carried out in 2010 and 2011 to examine a Neolithic cairn and a Bronze Age mound found near the cemetery, as well as to investigate two areas within the Iron Age enclosure. In 2012, a new excavation found the ruins of a sizeable Roman villa dating to around 370 AD, which had possibly been used by an important Romano-British chieftain. It was located only about 100 metres (330 ft) south of the Saxon graves and would have been part of an agricultural estate.

== Layout of the graves ==
The cemetery consists of neat lines of graves arranged on an east–west alignment, covering a nearly square area of about 36 by 34 metres (118 ft × 112 ft), in a layout not seen in any other known Anglo-Saxon cemetery. The enclosure within which the cemetery was laid out was many centuries older, dating to about 200 BC; the establishment of a cemetery within its boundaries was probably intended to serve as a deliberate link to the past. It would still have been clearly visible in Saxon times. The layout of the cemetery seem to have consciously reflected that of the earlier enclosure, with its apparent main entrance aligned with that of the enclosure.

Most of the graves were laid out in a highly ordered fashion with a double row on the north and south sides. Each grave was set 2.5 metres (8.2 ft) apart on an east–west axis and 2 metres (6.6 ft) apart north to south. None were intercut. They were arranged in a pattern that formed a square enclosure, with a gap in the southern side forming a main entrance and another smaller gap on the eastern side forming a secondary entrance or exit. The degree of precision visible in the layout strongly suggests that the cemetery was planned in advance.

There are several groups of graves, numbering around 22 per cent of the total, that do not fit into the overall square plan of the cemetery. A few of these seem to have been older burials, possibly Romano-British, but the others may have been laid out by different groups of people in Saxon times. The most notable of these "non-standard" burials is that of the woman dubbed the "Saxon Princess" near the very centre of the enclosure. Although her burial has attracted the most attention for the quality of its finds, it may not have been the most important grave in the cemetery. A second larger mound stood a short distance away, partly surrounded by a ring ditch. No burial was found within and the mound has been interpreted as a mausoleum or memorial to an important individual. It is noteworthy that the "Saxon Princess" and a number of burials in the cemetery's north-east quadrant were arranged in an arc around the mound, suggesting that it may have been seen as the focal point of the cemetery.

The discovery of the graves' east–west alignment has prompted suggestions that the cemetery reflected Christian tradition, although the evidence overall is contradictory about whether the occupants were Christians. The individual graves were fairly uniform in size, usually measuring 2 metres (6.6 ft) long, 0.8 metres (2.6 ft) wide and in their original form about 0.6 metres (2.0 ft) deep. They had a rectangular plan with rounded corners and a flat base. The bodies were not interred in coffins; the graves' occupants were buried in their clothes, accompanied by various items that they owned or were given as tokens by mourners. Although none of the bodies have survived it is thought from their size that most of the graves were intended for women, laid out fully extended. A substantial number are too small for an adult of normal height to have been laid out in such a way and, judging from analogous Saxon graves found elsewhere in England, it is thought that these might have contained crouched burials. The two different methods of burial – crouched versus fully extended – may therefore indicate some difference in ethnic affiliations or political or religious identities.

Some of the graves are marked by plain triangular stones set at one end. These are not carved or inscribed with names as in Christian cemeteries, but are similar to markers found in pagan cemeteries. Some graves are interrupted by stakeholes cut into them, possibly indicating the presence of wooden poles that might have served as markers or supported wooden structures within the graves. This is unusual in the north of England, though comparable examples have been found in Kent in the south-east.

In addition to the graves, several buildings stood within the cemetery. A larger rectangular structure with an east-west alignment, identified from postholes left in the ground, stood on the east side. It has been interpreted as a chapel or shrine. A smaller grubenhaus – a type of sunken building – which is thought to have been used as a mortuary chapel was located close by in the central area of the cemetery. An Iron Age roundhouse had also once been located within the north-west quadrant but was no longer standing at the time the cemetery was laid out. All of these buildings would have stood on the crest of a ridge, and would have been especially prominent to travelers arriving from the south.

The cemetery seems to have been laid out on a single occasion and used for only a short time afterwards. It is thought that the mourners would have entered through the south side and assembled in the empty south-western area of the cemetery before proceeding to the shrine to carry out the burial rites. After interring the deceased in a grave they may have used the eastern entrance to leave the cemetery. Alternatively, different groups of people may have used the two entrances, perhaps reflecting the fact that some of the graves do not fit into the overall square plan and may therefore belong to a different group.

== Artefacts ==
64 individual graves, comprising 59 per cent of the total in the cemetery, were found to contain artefacts. Certain types of artefact can help to identify the gender of the occupants; male graves, for instance, tend to contain weapons and tools, while female ones are associated with jewellery, shears and chatelaines (belt hooks) which were used to suspend keys or small tools. 34 of the graves contained such gender-specific goods, of which 19 were associated with females and 15 with males. The female graves seem to have been predominantly located in the north and west of the cemetery and the males in the south and east. It is possible that the paired graves may have been those of spouses, a pattern that is apparent from Saxon cemeteries elsewhere in the country.

15 of the graves contained beads and items of ironwork were found in 25 graves. A seax (a type of short sword with a blade on one edge) was found in grave 29 and was the only weapon found in the cemetery. The discovery of such weapons as grave goods is extremely rare, as their value meant that they were typically passed on from father to son rather than being buried with a person. It originally measured about 55 centimetres (22 in) long but had broken into four pieces, and part of the pommel and handle also survived. Its blade had been decorated with a punched pattern along the top edge. Smaller domestic knives were found in 19 graves as well as other items made of iron such as belt buckles and sets of keys. In grave 81, two whetstones for sharpening knives were discovered along with the knives themselves, one resting on top of each whetstone.

A variety of jewellery, beads, and charms was also found. 100 beads in total were recovered from 16 graves, though only two had more than 10 beads. The small number of beads found in the remaining 14 graves is indicative of how styles had changed; in the 6th century it was customary for women to wear up to 100 relatively plain beads at a time in the form of necklaces, but by the mid-7th century, the fashion was for a small number of high-quality beads which may have been attached with wire or carried in a bag. A very unusual discovery was made in grave 21 – the remnants of a necklace comprising eight beads and two Iron Age gold coins minted by the Corieltauvi tribe of modern Lincolnshire some time between 15–45 AD, before the Roman conquest of Britain. Holes had been drilled in the coins, which were more than 600 years old by the time they were buried, to convert them into items of jewellery. Their excellent condition suggests that they had not been used for long, or at all, as currency; it is possible that they had been part of a hoard buried shortly after they were minted and were rediscovered during Saxon times. The discovery of Roman coins in a Saxon grave of this period is unique to the Street House cemetery. It is likely that they were valued because of the cross-shaped designs on the coins' reverse.

Jewellery found in the Street House cemetery

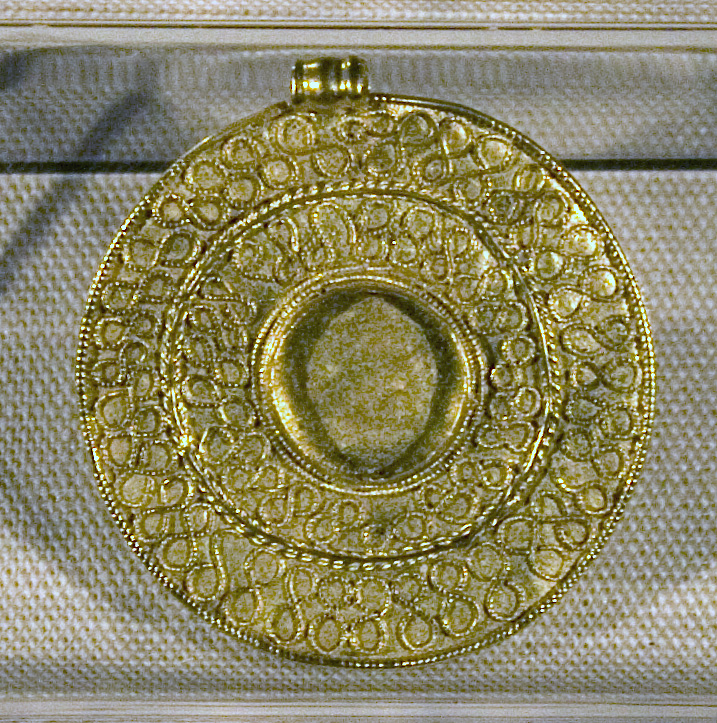
Filigreed brooch found in grave 10

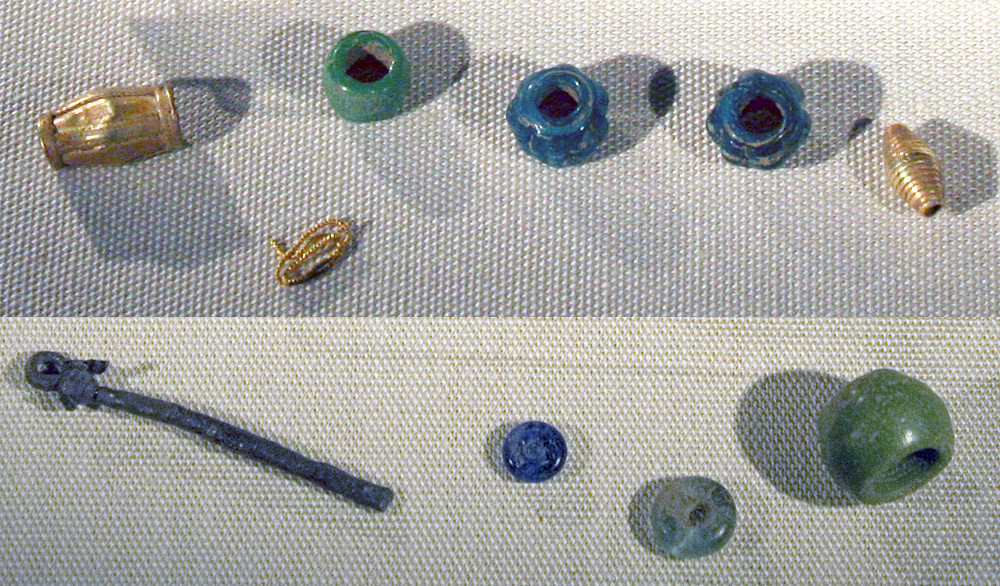
Beads found in graves 10 and 70

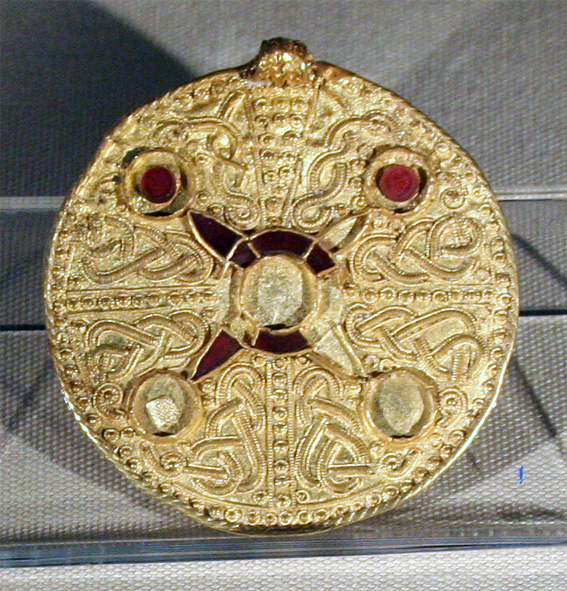
Jewelled brooch found in grave 70

An elaborate gold pendant was found in grave 10 along with three beads; all four had apparently been worn together on a chain or a thread, which did not survive. Although it is small – only 27 millimetres (1.1 in) in diameter – it is intricately decorated with a gold filigree in the shape of figures of eight (though the similarity in form to the numeral is merely coincidental). Its design is typical of jewellery made after 650 AD and comparable examples have been found elsewhere in Yorkshire. In grave 70, a gold pendant measuring 44 millimetres (1.7 in) in diameter was found during the 2007 excavation. It is decorated with elaborate filigrees like the brooch but it also incorporates four circular settings, each of which was inset with a red gemstone, though only two of the stones have survived. Several beads were found alongside the pendant and seem to have been part of the necklace of which it was a part.

== The "Saxon Princess" bed burial ==
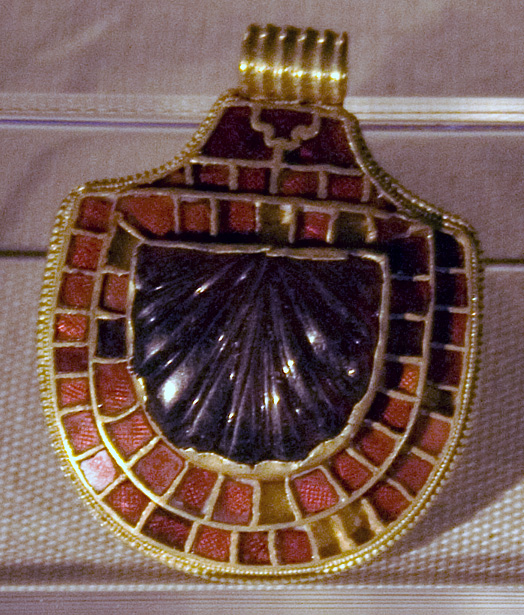
The scallop-shaped jewel found in grave 42 along with the remains of a bed on which a high-status woman was buried

The most important grave, and the most spectacular set of artefacts, was found near the centre of the cemetery. Grave 42 was a deep, wide pit in which a high-status individual was buried on top of a wooden bed with iron fittings. The body lying on the bed was most likely that of a woman of very high-ranking noble descent, possibly royalty, as the quantity and quality of the jewellery found in the grave is indicative of a woman ranking at the top of Anglo-Saxon society. Such burials are highly unusual; only a dozen are known in the whole of the UK, and the one at Street House is the most northerly known.

Although nothing remains of either the body or the bed, surviving artefacts and the 56 pieces of ironwork that held the bed together have enabled the burial to be reconstructed in considerable detail. The bed was made from ash wood, held together with a variety of iron plates, cleats, staples, nails, stays, and decorative scrolls. It measured 1.8 by 0.8 metres (5.9 ft × 2.6 ft) and may once have been roofed with an ornamental awning or canvas, perhaps made of cloth draped over timber posts. Traces of mineralised cloth and either grass or reed were found still attached to some of the nails, indicating the possible nature of the mattress. Two pieces of ironwork showed signs of repair and reuse, suggesting that the bed had been in use some time before the burial and was not specially made for the interment. This raises the possibility that the bed was either that of the deceased woman or a significant bed of some other person. It may have been dismantled elsewhere, brought to the cemetery and reassembled and repaired so that it could be used for the burial.

The jewellery consists of three gold pendants, two glass beads, one gold wire bead, and a fragment of a jet hair pin. The pendants and beads all seem to have been strung together, probably forming a necklace that was in place around the neck of the body. Two of the pieces consist of gold cabochon pendants inset with jewels, while the third is a very elaborate shield-shaped jewel inlaid with 57 red garnets and a larger scallop-shaped gem in the centre. The garnets rest on a thin layer of gold leaf to reflect the light and increase their luminosity. It may have been created from recycled older pieces of jewellery, as the size, shape and thickness of the individuals garnet are all different.

The quality of the piece is outstanding and comparable to that of the artefacts found at the famous Anglo-Saxon cemetery at Sutton Hoo in Suffolk. Its design is unique and has no known parallels elsewhere in Anglo-Saxon jewelcrafting; its creator must have been one of the best craftworkers in the country at the time. Its shape is a significant link with early Christianity. The scallop had long been associated with love, fertility and birth and was a symbol of the classical goddesses Aphrodite and her Roman counterpart Venus, who was said to have floated ashore on a scallop shell (as in Sandro Botticelli's famous depiction of The Birth of Venus). By the 4th century, however, Christians had adopted the scallop as a symbol of rebirth through baptism and life as a journey towards a heavenly reunion with God. It came to be particularly associated with pilgrimages and was later adopted as a pilgrim's badge.

An analysis conducted using X-ray fluorescence has found that the pendant was made from a highly debased gold alloy, with only 37% of the alloy consisting of gold and the remainder consisting of silver with some copper. It is likely that the gold came from melted-down coins of the Merovingian dynasty of Francia. The Frankish currency underwent a similar debasing at around this time. The link with Francia is illustrative of the trading and cultural links that existed between Anglo-Saxon England and continental Europe at the time.

A grave found a short distance away also contained jewellery, including a gold pendant, silver brooch, and glass beads. It is thought that the occupant may have had a close connection with the woman in the bed burial – perhaps a relative or a lady-in-waiting who was buried with her mistress.

== Interpretations and historical context ==
Map of central and southern Britain at the start of the 7th century

At the time of the cemetery's use in the latter part of the 7th century, Britain was divided into a number of kingdoms ruled by different ethnic groups – the native Picts in the north (in what is now Scotland), the native Britons in the west of what is now England, Wales and south-western Scotland, and the immigrant Angles, Saxons, and Jutes in the east and south of modern England and south-eastern Scotland. Until the early 7th century, the north-east of England and parts of Scotland were ruled by two Saxon kingdoms: Deira in modern Yorkshire, and Bernicia from north of the River Tees to the Firth of Forth. By the time of the burials the two kingdoms had merged to form the powerful kingdom of Northumbria.

There were considerable connections – political, trading, and cultural – between the Anglo-Saxon kingdoms and this is demonstrated in the burial ground found at Street House. The practice of burying people in beds seems to have been very uncommon in the north; most of the bed burials found so far have been in southern England, in Cambridgeshire, Essex, Suffolk, and Wiltshire. Several of the brooches and beads found in the graves are thought to have come from Kent and some of the jewellery and beadwork has strong parallels with finds from East Anglia. The Iron Age gold coins found in one grave came from a tribe that lived in the East Midlands, which suggests that their owner, likewise, was not local.

The identity of the woman in the bed is not known, but the archaeologists who excavated the site have suggested that she was "a female member of the local aristocracy, probably a princess and an outsider, whose personal status was strong enough to act as a catalyst for the site" and that her companions were similarly "a group of people of high status from outside the region." Average life expectancy at the time was short – only 32 years for men and 28 years for women – so it is possible that the cemetery was used exclusively by members of the "princess's" community and ceased to be used when the last member died. This would fit with its short period of usage, perhaps only 30 years or so, judging from the age of the artefacts found during the excavations. Steve Sherlock, the site's discoverer, believes that she was buried first and that the other graves were dug around hers afterward. Next to her grave is a probable male grave, to which it may be linked. The close proximity of the graves and their offset from the rest of the graves in the cemetery raises questions about whether the occupants were related.

The cemetery provides some hints to the woman's local connections and religious affiliations. She was buried around or soon after the time when St. Hilda of Whitby was active in the region, first at Hartlepool Abbey, then at Whitby Abbey, which was founded in 657. The woman may well have known St. Hilda, who came from a similar aristocratic background and had lived for a while in East Anglia, where bed burials were more common. It is unclear, however, whether the woman was also a Christian. Features such as the typically Christian east-west orientation of the graves have been cited in support of a Christian affiliation, but on the other hand the cemetery was built on an ancient pagan site and there is no obvious reason why a Christian princess would not have been buried at Whitby alongside fellow Christians. As Christianity was spreading across the region at this time, the possible Christian features of the cemetery could be due simply to local social convention favouring some Christian styles in burial rituals, even for non-Christians. Steve Sherlock considers the bed burial to be "stridently pagan, a sort of rare, female equivalent of ship burials, as she is laid out on a vehicle to deliver her to the afterworld," however, and he suggests that she may have been the centre of a pagan cult that was active alongside local Christians.

Others have argued that the cemetery represents a fusion of Christian and pagan Saxon customs. It was not until the end of the 7th century that the practice of burying people in consecrated ground around a church became the norm. There are examples of known Christians being buried in an ostensibly pagan fashion, as was the case for the late 7th century Kentish princess Eormengyth, sister of the abbess of Minster-in-Thanet. She was buried in a traditional tumulus a mile east of her sister's minster. John Blair argues that the Church in early Saxon England may have tolerated Christians being given pagan burial rites due to the 'Christianising' effect this would have had on a pagan site. This would have been consistent with the advice given by Pope Gregory the Great in 601 that Saxon shrines should be converted to Christian use, rather than being destroyed, and that pagan festivals and rites should be converted into Christian ones. On this interpretation, the cemetery may symbolise the continuity between the pagan past and the increasingly Christianised present.

== Conservation, acquisition and display ==
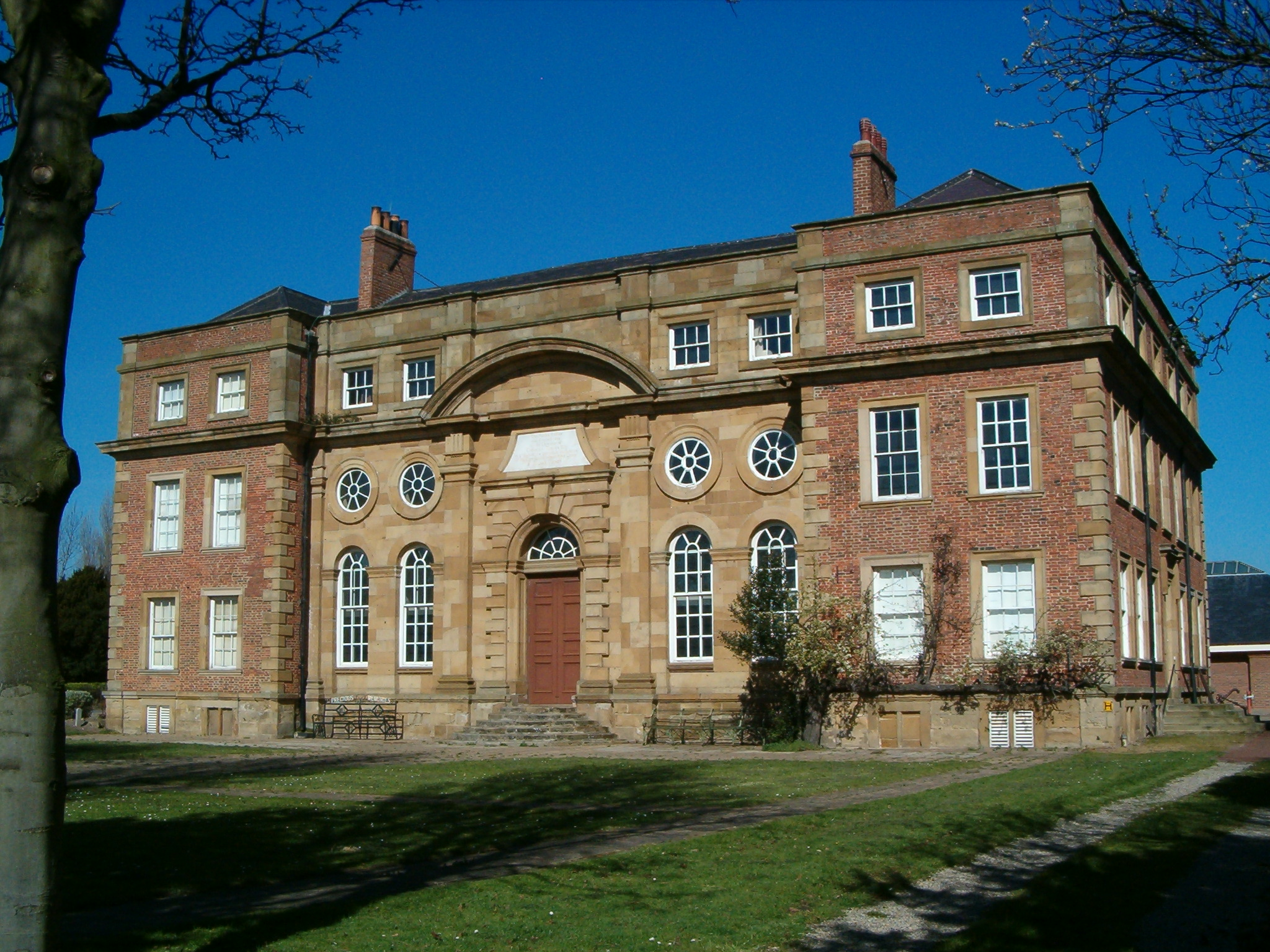
Kirkleatham Old Hall Museum, where the Street House finds are on display

The discovery was announced on 20 November 2007 and several of the finds were displayed to the press at Kirkleatham Museum near Redcar. Ashok Kumar, the local Member of Parliament at the time, lent his support to a campaign to keep the artefacts in Redcar and Cleveland, saying: "It's essential they are kept in this area at Kirkleatham Museum and not merely deposited at a museum in London where there would be no guarantee of permanent display. I ... want to see these treasures kept here so local people and schoolchildren can view them as part of their local heritage and as an aid to their understanding of the past." The Culture Minister, Margaret Hodge, confirmed in a House of Commons debate that the British Museum would not object to Kirkleatham acquiring the finds.

The Teesside coroner held an inquest on 12 October 2008 that found that the finds were treasure trove under the terms of the Treasure Act 1996. The rules of treasure trove require that a panel of experts determine the market value of a find, half of which is paid to the finder and the other half to the landowner. However, the landowner at Street House waived his share because he wanted to ensure that a local museum would be able to purchase the artefacts. The Heritage Lottery Fund provided Kirkleatham Museum with a grant of £274,000 to fund the purchase and create a new Anglo-Saxon gallery to display the artefacts.

The finds were purchased by the museum in April 2009 and underwent conservation by specialists at Durham University and York Archaeological Trust. Using tools of the Anglo-Saxon period, a replica of the bed was created for the exhibition by Richard Darrah, an expert in early woodwork, and blacksmith Hector Cole, a crafter of medieval-style ironwork. A short film about the princess was made at the Anglo-Saxon museum at Bede's World in Jarrow with a narration by Stephen Tompkinson. Prior to the opening of the exhibition at Kirkleatham, the finds were put on display for five days in May 2011 at Loftus Town Hall, where they attracted nearly 1,700 visitors.

The exhibition at Kirkleatham has proved extremely popular; by October 2011 it had already attracted more than 28,000 visitors in only four months. In April 2012 the exhibition attracted further praise when the museum won the prestigious Renaissance Museum title at the annual Journal and Arts Council Awards.

== See also ==
- List of Anglo-Saxon cemeteries
- List of Anglo-Saxon bed burials

== Bibliography ==
- Catling, Chris (August 2013). "Buried in a royal bed". Current Archaeology (281): 20–27.
- Darvill, Timothy C. (2009). Prehistoric Britain. Taylor & Francis US. ISBN 9780415490269.
- Sherlock, Stephen J.; Simmons, Mark (May–June 2008). "The Lost Royal Cult Of Street House, Yorkshire". British Archaeology (100).
- Sherlock, Stephen J.; Simmons, Mark (June 2008). "A seventh-century royal cemetery at Street House, north-east Yorkshire, England". Antiquity. 82 (316). Archived from the original on 5 March 2012.
- Sherlock, Stephen J. (2011a). The Anglo-Saxon Princess Exhibition Guidebook. Kirkleatham Museum.
- Sherlock, Stephen J. (2011b). Excavations at Street House 2011. Tees Archaeology.
- Viegas, Jennifer (11 April 2008). "Bejeweled Anglo-Saxon Burial Suggests Cult". Discovery News. Archived from the original on 24 December 2011.
- "Anglo-Saxon Weapons (Saxon Princess exhibition)". Kirkleatham Museum. 2011.
- "The Cemetery (Saxon Princess exhibition)". Kirkleatham Museum. 2011.
- "The Graves (Saxon Princess exhibition)". Kirkleatham Museum. 2011.
- "Other Finds from the Cemetery (Saxon Princess exhibition)". Kirkleatham Museum. 2011.
- Historic England (2010). "Street House, monument no. 611709 (611709)". Research records (formerly PastScape).
- Historic England (2000). "Street House, monument no. 611713 (611713)". Research records (formerly PastScape).
- "Anglo-Saxon Royal Burial on Teesside". Current Archaeology. 31 January 2008.
