= Harpole Treasure =

Archaeological site in Northamptonshire, England

- Location within Northamptonshire
- 52.24°N 0.99°W
- Type: Tomb
- Periods: Anglo-Saxon
- Cultures: Anglo-Saxon, Christian
- Location: Harpole, Northamptonshire, England, United Kingdom

Site notes
- Excavation dates: 2022

The Harpole Treasure is a collection of Anglo-Saxon artefacts excavated at a bed burial discovered in spring 2022 in Harpole, 4 miles (6.4 km) west of Northampton, England. It includes a necklace described as "the most ornate of its kind ever found". The Anglo-Saxon site dates to between 630 and 670 CE. The woman buried at the site is presumed to have been of high status in the early Christian church. The archaeological site is classified as a bed burial, in which the person, typically a woman of high status, was interred on top of a bed.

== Excavation ==
The site at Harpole was excavated prior to housing development by Vistry Group, an instance of developer-funded archaeology. The work, by Museum of London Archaeology (MOLA), was supported by the RPS Group. The burial was discovered on the penultimate day of an eight-week excavation period.

The archaeological excavation was included in a January 2023 episode of BBC Two television series Digging for Britain, presented by Alice Roberts.

== Treasure ==
A considerable number of precious metal and stone jewellery pieces were uncovered in the excavation, many comprising one of the most ornate necklaces of its type that has been found to date. The first piece of treasure was found by MOLA dig leader Levente-Bence Balázs. A senior finds specialist at MOLA, Lyn Blackmore, stated that the number and ornate design of the items is considered unusual for a Christian burial of that period because the potentially ostentatious nature of such was frowned upon by the Church at that time. Another item found in the burial was a large, elaborately decorated cross featuring depictions of a human face in delicate silver with blue glass eyes, and two pots containing an unknown residue.

While not so numerous as some pagan burial treasures, in some ways the artefacts bear more resemblance to them than to Christian sites.

== See also ==
- Sutton Hoo, Suffolk
- Trumpington bed burial
