= Frederick Nunn =

English cricketer

Frederick Nunn (c. 1837 – 16 December 1870) was an English cricketer who played first-class cricket for Cambridge University Cricket Club in 1859. He was born and died at Ixworth, Suffolk, though the precise date of his birth is not known.

Nunn was educated at Bury St Edmunds Grammar School and at Emmanuel College, Cambridge. Nunn played cricket as a tail-end batsman and a bowler; it is not known whether he was right- or left-handed and what his bowling style was, and indeed the bowling figures for his more successful first-class appearance, the game against the Marylebone Cricket Club in which it is known that he took three wickets, are incomplete. His second and final first-class match was the 1859 University Match against Oxford University, when he bowled 31 overs for just 31 runs, but took only one wicket; for this match, he was awarded his cricket Blue.

Nunn graduated from Cambridge University in 1860 with a Bachelor of Arts degree; that converted to a Master of Arts in 1864. He became a schoolmaster, being second master at Derby Grammar School from 1860. He became a Church of England priest, but appears not to have held any clerical positions, and died at the age of 33.
