= Ixworth =

Village in Suffolk, England

Coordinates: 52.300°N 0.833°E

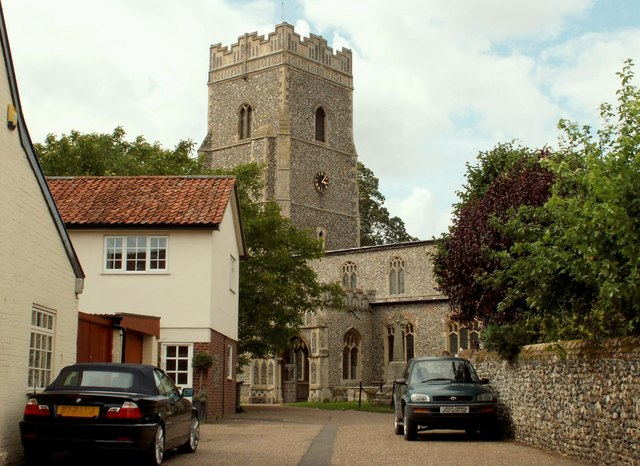
- Church of St Mary, Ixworth

- Location within Suffolk
- Population: 2,365 (2011)
- OS grid reference: TL934704
- Civil parish: Ixworth
- District: West Suffolk
- Shire county: Suffolk
- Region: East
- Country: England
- Sovereign state: United Kingdom
- Post town: Bury St Edmunds
- Postcode district: IP31
- Dialling code: 01359
- Police: Suffolk
- Fire: Suffolk
- Ambulance: East of England
- UK Parliament: Bury St Edmunds and Stowmarket

Ixworth is a village and civil parish in the West Suffolk district of Suffolk, England, 6 miles (9.7 km) north-east of Bury St Edmunds on the A143 road to Diss and 9 miles (14 km) south-east of Thetford. The parish had a population of 2,365 at the 2011 Census.

== History ==
Ixworth was settled by the Romans and was the site of a 1st-century fort. The fort is believed to have been built as a response to Boudicca's revolt and appears to have been in use only until the end of the 1st century. The site measures 193 metres (633 ft) by 205 metres (673 ft) and was surrounded by three ditches.

After the fort went out of use a civilian settlement was established at the site, possibly with a pottery industry. Ixworth became an important junction in the Roman road system of East Anglia and the Peddars Way ran 48 miles (77 km) from Ixworth to Holme next the Sea on the north coast of Norfolk. The foundations of a Roman building with hypocaust were discovered in 1834 and are believed to be a villa and bath house complex.

An early pagan cemetery with Anglo-Saxon burial urns was discovered south-west of the church some time before 1849, and a number of other post-Roman archaeological finds have been discovered in the area. In 1856, the Ixworth Cross, a gold pectoral cross covered in garnets dating from the 7th century, was discovered in what is believed to be another Anglo-Saxon cemetery. The cross is decorated using cloisonné work and was donated to the Ashmolean Museum in Oxford in 1909. It was discovered in a rare bed burial.

The first recorded name for Ixworth is from 1025 as Gyxeweorde meaning "Enclosure of a man called Gisca". It was mentioned again as Gyxeweor∂e in the S1225 charter of 1040 where Thurketel grants the lands to Bury St Edmunds Abbey. The settlement was recorded in the Domesday Book of 1086 as "Icsewrda" or "Giswortha". The village, which was in the Hundred of Blackbourn, was relatively very large at this time with 51 households. It was held by Robert Blunt or Blount in 1086, having formed part of the lands controlled by the Abbey of Bury St Edmunds in 1066.

Ixworth Priory was founded as an Augustinian priory in about 1170 and dissolved in 1537. Remains of the priory include the almost complete east range whilst some of the west range can be found incorporated into a house, known as Ixworth Abbey. These remains are a Grade I listed building and include elements from the early 13th century.

Ixworth is the site the earliest rural council housing built in England. Four pairs of houses were built in 1893–94 for Thingoe Rural District Council, encouraged by the Ixworth Labourers' Association. These were built under the Housing of the Working Classes Act 1890, the first to allow rural councils to build their own housing. The act was only adopted by eight councils. The houses exist today in a largely unaltered condition. Two of them, on Stow Road, are Grade II listed buildings.

A Q Type bombing decoy was operated in the north-east of the parish to deflect enemy bombing from RAF Honington.

A former pumping station at Bailypool Lane off Stow Lane was given planning permission in 2012 for conversion to a residential dwelling.

== Modern Ixworth ==
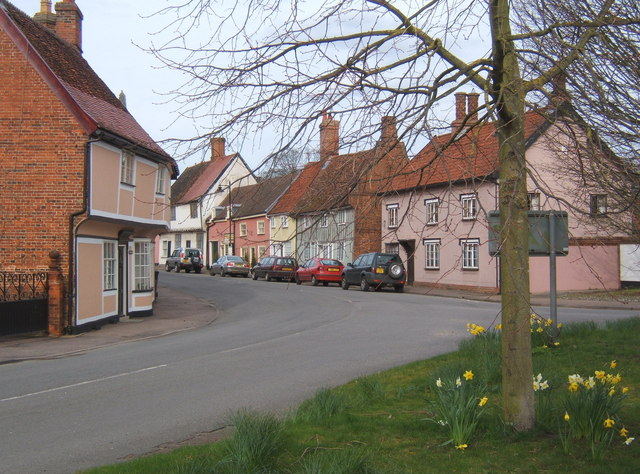
Ixworth High Street from the south

St Mary's Church lies just west of High Street. The church dates from the late 14th century with a late 15th-century tower. It contains memorials to Richard Coddington, who was granted the land owned by the priory following the dissolution. The church is a Grade I Listed Building.

The village contains a number of other listed buildings, many on the High Street, some of which have medieval elements. A variety of local services remain in the village, including shops and public houses as well as a village hall, doctor's surgery, a retained fire station and police station sharing the same building.

Ixworth is served by rural bus routes and is on the National Express London to Great Yarmouth coach route. The village was bypassed in 1986 when the A143 was diverted to run to the south-east of the village.

== Government ==
Ixworth is in the West Suffolk district and until April 2019 the St Edmundsbury district and elected one borough councillor. It lies in the Blackbourn division of Suffolk County Council and the West Suffolk parliamentary constituency. The parish council jointly administers Ixworth and Ixworth Thorpe.

== Education ==
Ixworth Church of England Voluntary Controlled Primary School , run by the Tilian Partnership, educates children aged 5 to 11 and its maintained nursery school/class offers places to three to five year olds. At the end of year 6, children can transfer to Ixworth High School run by Sapientia Education Trust, which educates students aged 11 to 16, or Thurston Community College, which educates students aged 11 to 18.

== Bangrove Wood SSSI ==
Bangrove Wood, around 1 mile (1.6 km) north of the village, is a Site of Special Scientific Interest (SSSI). This is an area of ancient woodland of 18.2 hectares (45 acres). The wood contains species such as ash, field maple, oak and hazel as well as wild cherry and a range of ground vegetation species.

== Notable residents ==
- Thomas Norton
- John Griffiths
- John Lamb
- Joy Marshall
- Guy Simonds
- Bertie Stevens
- Frederick Nunn
