= Shrubland Hall Anglo-Saxon cemetery =

7th century burial site in Suffolk, England

Coordinates: 52.140°N 1.115°E

Position within Suffolk.

Shrubland Hall Anglo-Saxon cemetery is a 7th-century Anglo-Saxon burial site discovered at Shrubland Hall Quarry near Coddenham, Suffolk. The cemetery contains fifty burials and a number of high-status graves including "the most complicated Anglo-Saxon bed ever found." Bed burials, in which a female body is laid out on an ornamental wooden bed, usually accompanied by jewellery, are rarely found, and are considered of national importance. Only 13 bed burials have been found to date in the UK. The bed burial was one of two graves at the cemetery which were found within wooden-lined chambers. The second chamber contained a male skeleton with grave goods including a seax, a spear, a shield, an iron-bound wooden bucket, a copper alloy bowl and a drinking horn.

The site was uncovered by Suffolk County Council's Archaeology Service in 1999 during exploratory excavations prior to gravel extraction by the quarry operators. Evidence of Iron Age and Roman activity had previously been identified in the area.

== See also ==
- List of Anglo-Saxon cemeteries
- List of Anglo-Saxon bed burials
- Burial in Early Anglo-Saxon England
