= Pectoral cross =

Cross worn on the chest by Christian clergy

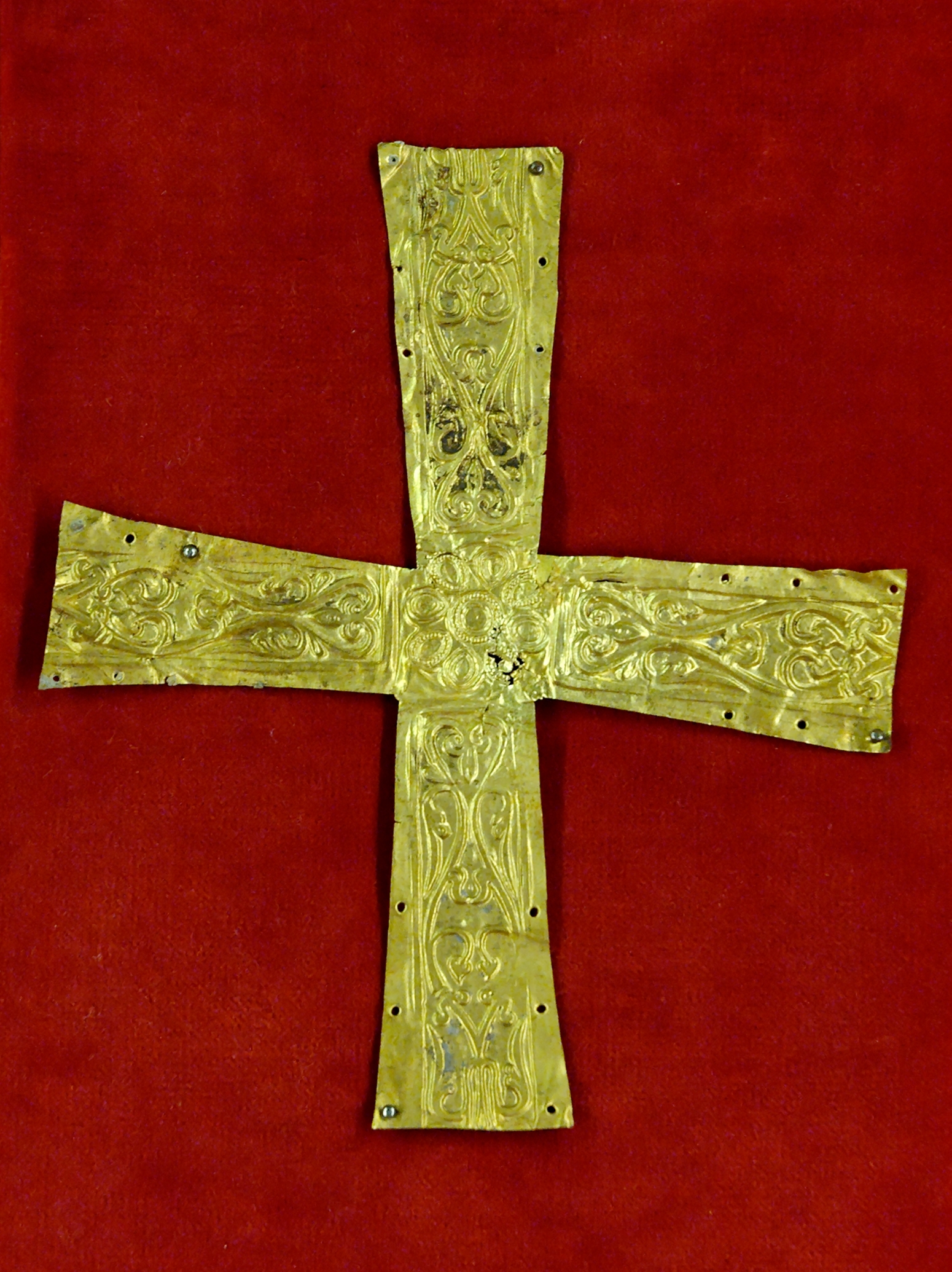
Gold pectoral cross from Italy or subalpine regions, late 6th century–7th century

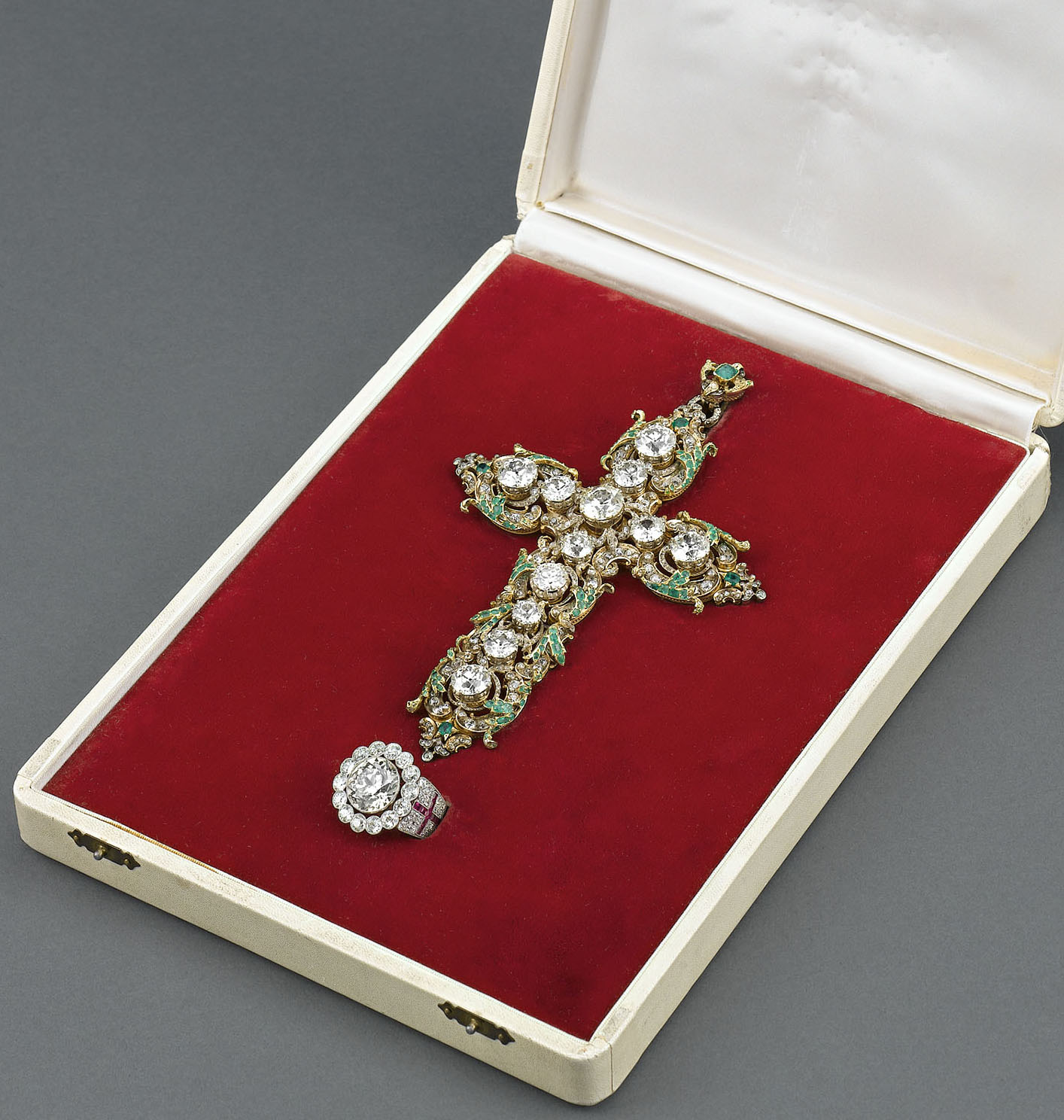
Pectoral Cross of Pope Paul VI

A pectoral cross or pectorale (from the Latin pectoralis, "of the chest") is a cross that is worn on the chest, usually suspended from the neck by a cord or chain. In ancient history and the Middle Ages, pectoral crosses were worn by both clergy and laity. By the Late Middle Ages, the pectoral cross came to be a special indicator of position worn by bishops. In the Roman Catholic Church, the wearing of a pectoral cross remains restricted to popes, cardinals, bishops and abbots. In Eastern Orthodox Church and Byzantine Catholic Churches that follow a Slavic Tradition, priests also wear pectoral crosses, while deacons and minor orders do not. The modern pectoral cross is relatively large, and is different from the small crosses worn on necklaces by many Christians. Most pectoral crosses are made of precious metals (platinum, gold or silver) and some contain precious or semi-precious gems. Some contain a corpus like a crucifix while others use stylized designs and religious symbols.

In many Christian denominations, the pectoral cross symbolizes that the person wearing it is a member of the clergy, or that the wearer is a member of the higher or senior clergy. However, in many Western churches there are an increasing number of laypeople who choose to wear some form of a cross around their neck.

While many Christians, both clergy and laity, wear crosses, the pectoral cross is distinguished by both its size (up to six inches across) and that it is worn in the center of the chest below the heart (as opposed to just below the collarbones).

Throughout the centuries, many pectoral crosses have been made in the form of reliquaries which contain alleged fragments of the True Cross or relics of saints. Some such reliquary pectorals are hinged so that they open to reveal the relic, or the relic may be visible from the front through glass.

== Historical use ==
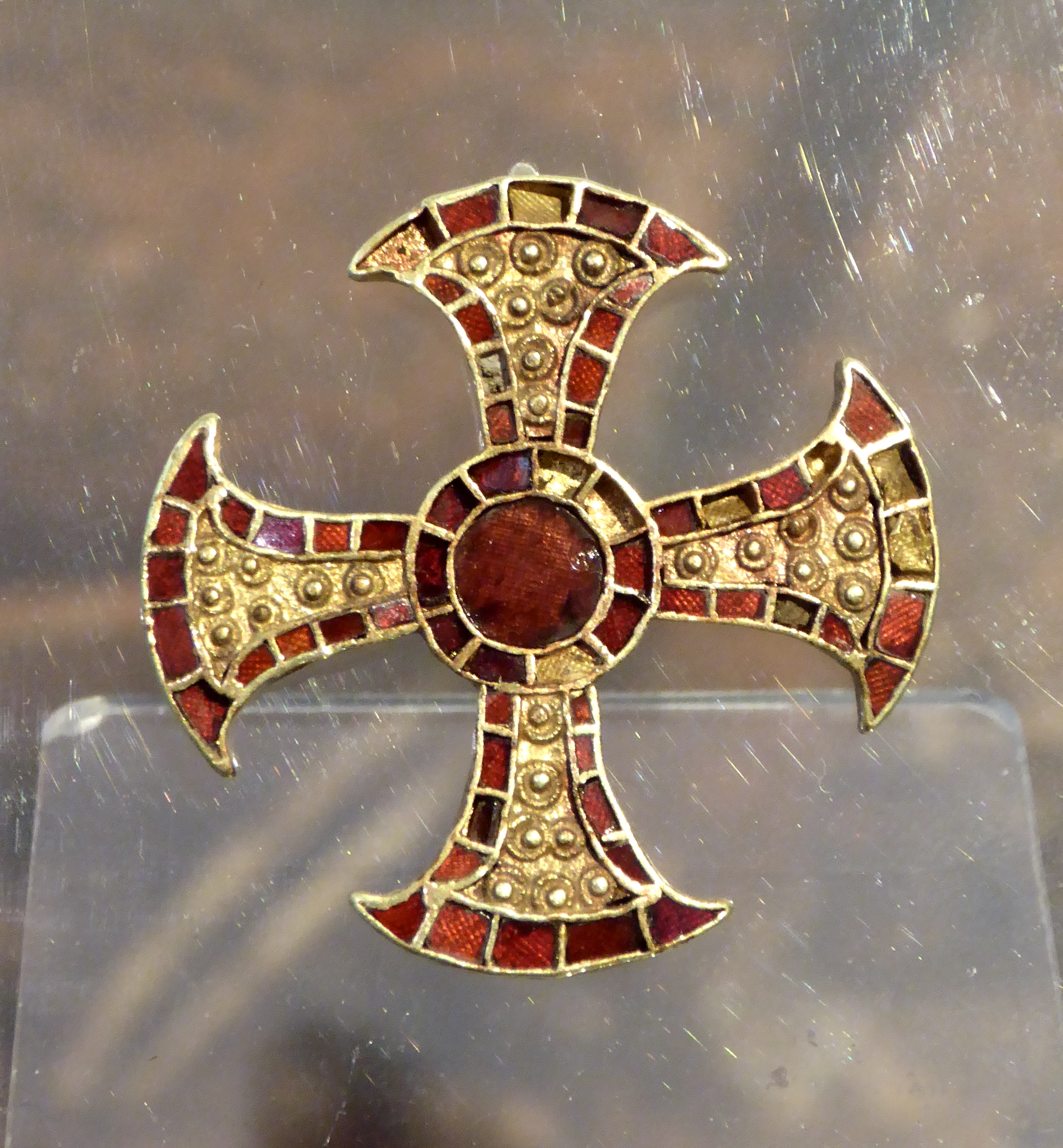
A pectoral cross worn by the 7th-century female teenager of the Trumpington bed burial

One of the earliest mentions of a pectoral cross is its mention by Pope Hilarius in 461. In 811 Nicephorus sent Pope Leo III a golden pectoral cross. At this time, pectoral crosses were worn by both clergy and laity.

The widespread official use of a pectoral cross, however, did not begin in the Western church until around the 14th century. The use of the pectoral cross in the Roman Rite was first required in the Roman Pontifical of Pope Pius V.

The first Anglican bishop to wear a pectoral cross was Edward King, Bishop of Lincoln (1885–1910).

== Roman Catholic practice ==
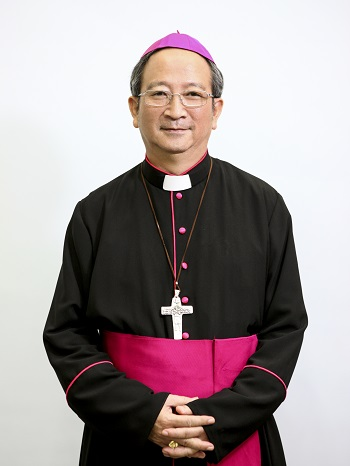
Archbishop Paul Bùi Văn Đọc of Vietnam wearing Pope Francis' Good Shepherd pectoral cross suspended by a chain while in cassock

In the Roman Catholic Church, a pectoral cross is one of the pontificals used by the pope, cardinals, archbishops and bishops. Various popes have extended this privilege to abbots, abbesses and some cathedral canons. For Cardinals, the use has been regulated since 1905 by Pius X's motu proprio Crux pectoralis.

A pectoral cross is worn with both clerical suits or religious habits, and when attending both liturgical or civil functions. With a clerical suit, the pectoral cross either is worn hung around the neck so it remains visible or is placed in the left shirt or coat pocket so the chain is still visible but the cross is not (this is not actually an official requirement, but is done for practical purposes). If a cassock is worn, the pectoral cross either is suspended from the prelate's neck and hangs free or is fastened to a front button with a special hook that is attached to the cross. The presence of a pectoral cross is useful to distinguish a bishop from a monsignor, since they wear similar cassocks.

In choir dress—that is, when the bishop wears a cassock, rochet and mozzetta—the pectoral cross is usually suspended by a cord of silk. This cord is green and gold for an archbishop or a bishop, red and gold for a cardinal, and gold for the pope. An abbot makes use of a black and gold silk cord while an abbess and canon would use a black silk cord. Formerly, protonotaries apostolic wore a pectoral cross on a purple silk cord when celebrating in pontificals.

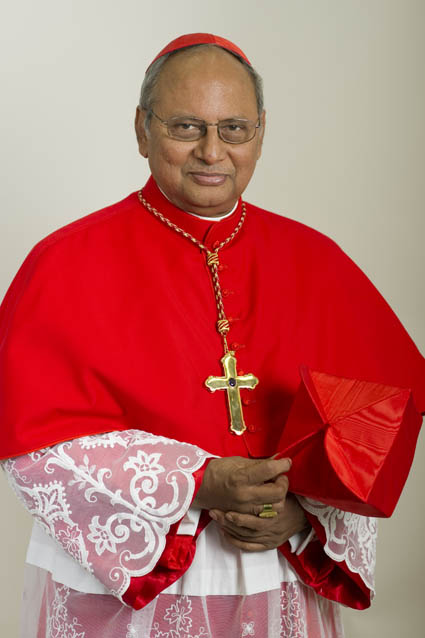
Cardinal Patabendige Don of Colombo wearing a pectoral cross suspended by a cord while in choir dress

When celebrating Mass, bishops wear the pectoral cross suspended by the cord over the alb but under the chasuble, where it is not visible. However, some bishops now wear their pectoral cross over their chasuble, suspended by a chain.

If clerics who do not possess episcopal character wish to wear a pectoral cross, it is presumed that they are free to wear it under their clothes, so as not to confuse them with bishops. Again, in practice, some clergy who are not prelates do wear a pectoral cross.

It is worn over the alb during liturgical functions. The prelate should kiss the cross before putting it on his neck, and while putting it on say the prayer Munire me digneris (the origin of which dates back to the Middle Ages), in which he petitions God for protection against his enemies, and begs to bear in mind continually the Passion of Jesus, and the triumphs of the confessors of the Catholic faith.

The pontifical pectoral cross is distinct from the simple cross, the use of which is often permitted by the pope to members of cathedral chapters. Canons, to whom this privilege has been granted, are permitted to wear the cross at choir service only, and not over the alb at liturgical services, unless specially permitted.

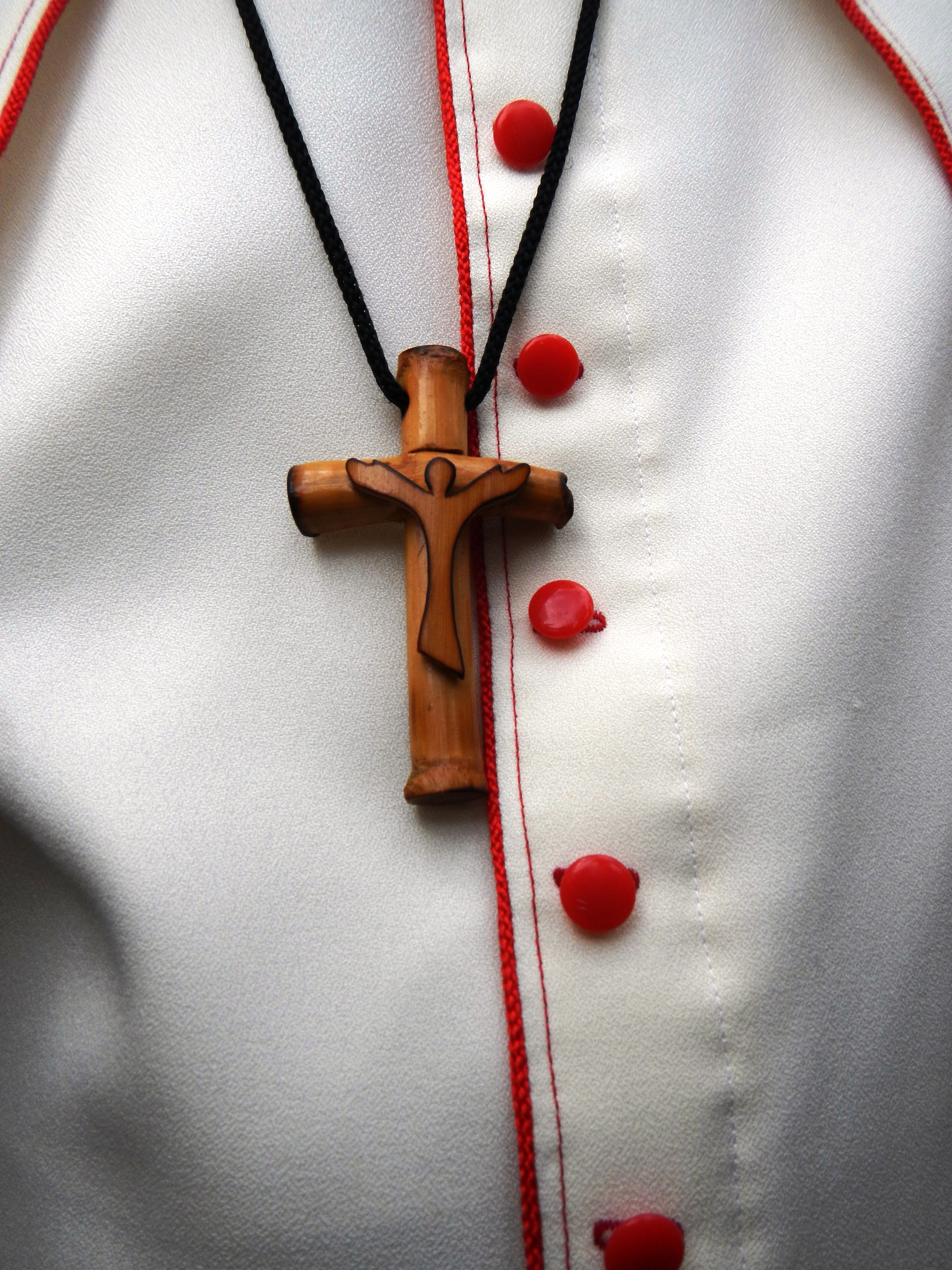
Pectoral Cross of Archbishop Paciano Aniceto of the Philippines made from Philippine Native Bamboo

The pectoral is the latest addition to episcopal ornaments. The custom, however, of wearing a cross on the breast either with or without holy relics, dates back to ancient time and was observed not only by bishops, but also by priests and lay people. The first mention made of the pectoral cross as a part of pontifical ornament is made by Pope Innocent III, and its use as such only became customary toward the close of the Middle Ages. Guillaume Durand, toward the end of the thirteenth century, is the first to mention it as an adornment for bishops, saying that "it was left to the discretion of the individual bishop to wear it or not".

== Anglican practice ==
The widespread use of pectoral crosses has been revived in the Anglican Communion, and is usually limited to bishops. The pectorals worn by Anglican bishops do not normally have the corpus (body of Jesus) depicted on them. They may be decorated with amethyst or a bishop's mitre, and are usually suspended from a simple gold chain. Anglo-Catholic bishops may follow more of the Roman Catholic model.

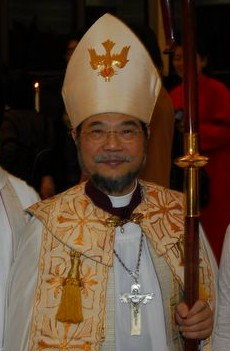
Soo Yee Po, Anglican bishop of the Diocese of Western Kowloon

Other Anglican clergy occasionally wear crosses around their necks, but their appearance and form are generally more modest so as not to confuse them with bishops (who also generally wear purple, palatinate, or amaranth magenta shirts).

At their meeting in The Vatican on 21 November 2009 to resolve tensions over an offer for disaffected Anglicans to convert to Rome, the Pope gave the Archbishop of Canterbury a pectoral Cross. This was interpreted by some observers as an indication that the Pope recognized the Archbishop of Canterbury as a Bishop, in spite of Apostolicae curae a papal bull from 1897 under which the Catholic Church refuses to recognize the validity of Anglican ordination. However, the Catholic Church still rejects the canonical validity of Anglican clerical orders and often re-ordains Anglican clergy who convert to the Catholic faith.

== Lutheran/Presbyterian practice ==
In recent years, Protestant churches have returned to more traditional ceremonial dress from either the Catholic or Orthodox. Pectoral crosses are worn by clergy in many denominations, mainly Lutheranism, by a bishop, or by a pastor or occasionally by choristers or liturgical assistants in other denominations. In Presbyterian churches such as the Church of Scotland pectoral crosses of any style can be worn by Ministers or the Moderator of the General Assembly of the Church. Generally speaking, only prelates will wear a gold cross suspended with a chain when wearing ceremonial garments or when wearing a suit, in one's left pocket over the heart. Clergy who are not bishops usually wear a silver cross suspended by a cord (usually black).

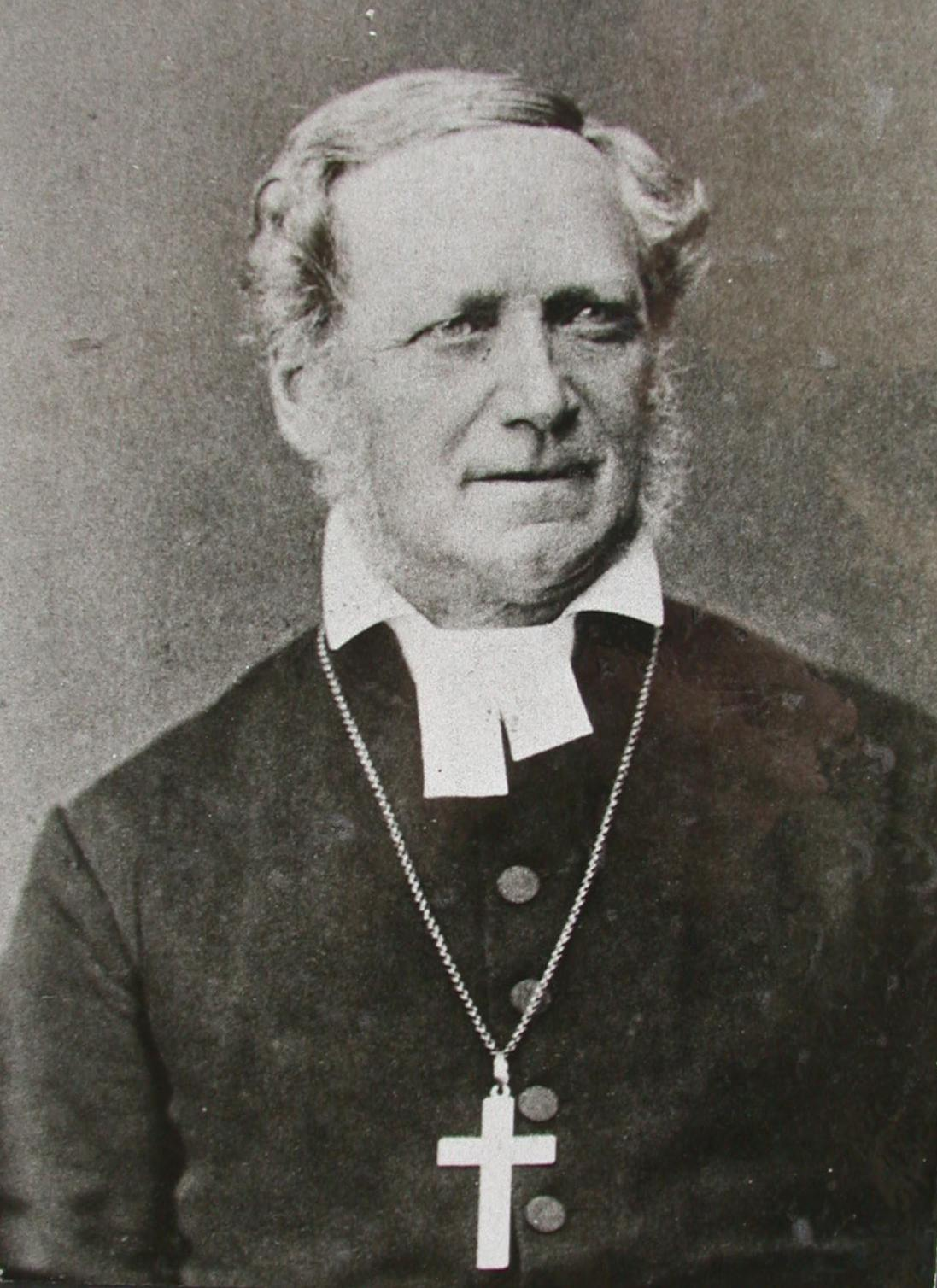
The bishop of Strängnäs Thure Annerstedt wearing a pectoral cross of the model used in the Church of Sweden

=== Church of Sweden ===
In the Church of Sweden, pectoral crosses were reintroduced for bishops in 1805 by king Gustav IV Adolf. The model of 1805 is still in use today. Bishops wear a simple Latin cross of gold suspended by a gold chain. The archbishop of Uppsala uses the same model with the addition of golden rays in the angles of the cross.

== Eastern Catholic and Orthodox practice ==
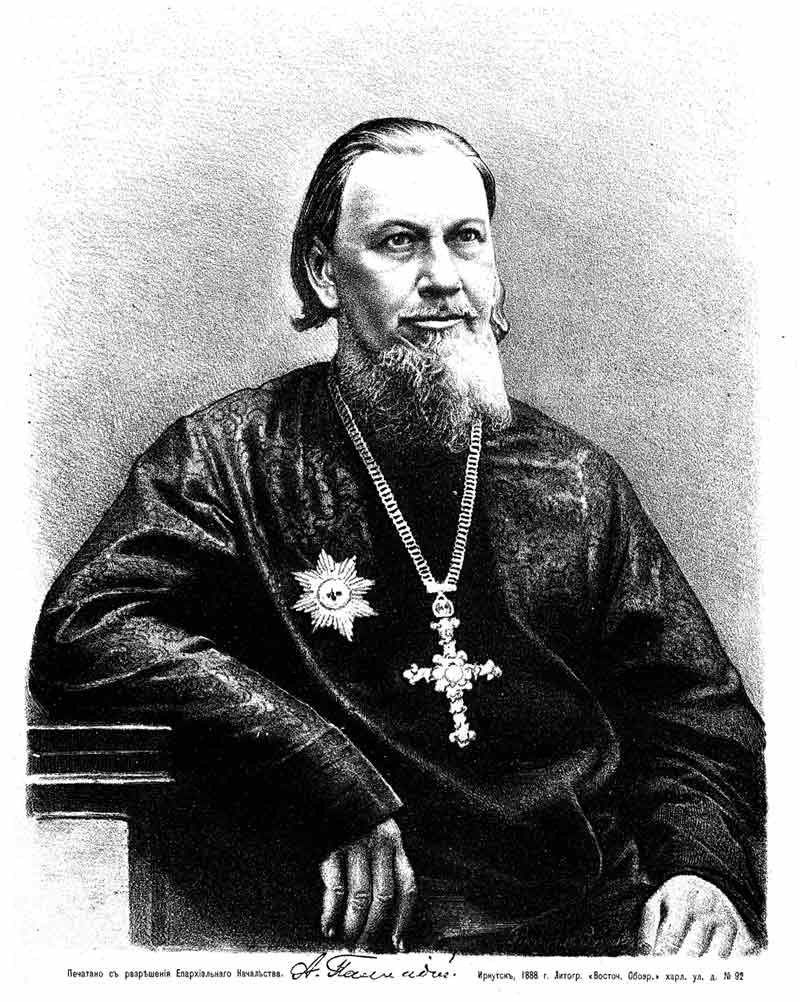
Russian Orthodox Archimandrite Palladius (Kafarov), wearing gold pectoral cross with jewels (1888)

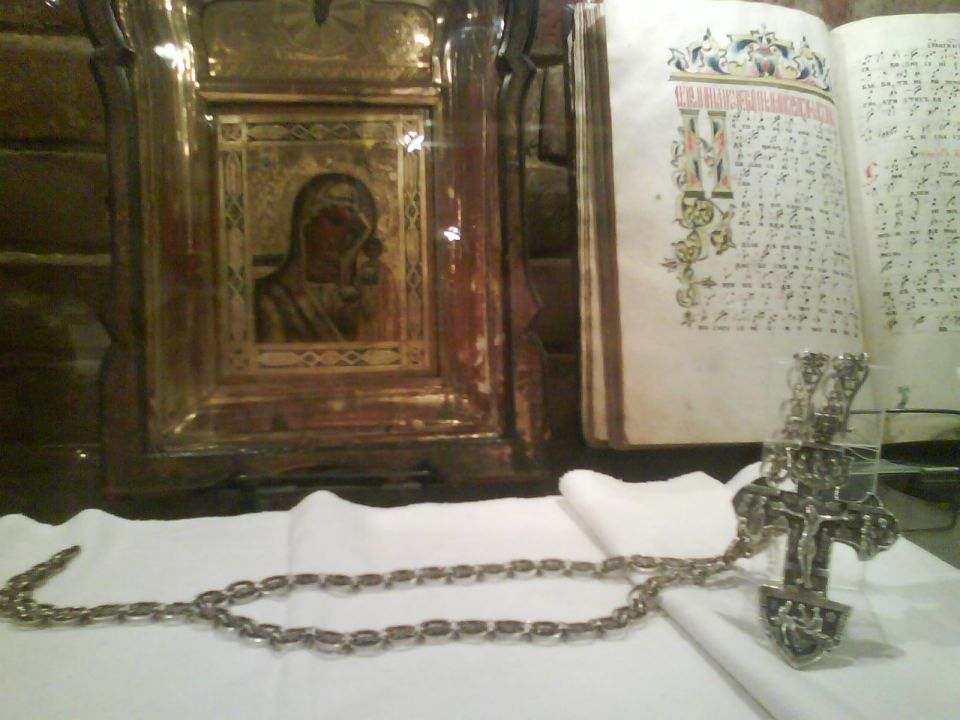
Orthodox Silver pectoral cross

In Orthodox practice, the pectoral cross is worn by all bishops, but not necessarily by all priests. In the Greek tradition, the pectoral cross is only given to specific priests for faithful service; in the Russian tradition, the silver cross is worn by all priests. Whenever the cross is put on, the wearer first uses it to make the Sign of the Cross on himself and then kisses it and puts it on.

The priest's cross depicts the crucified Christ, whether in painted form as an icon, or in relief. However, the Orthodox crucifix differs from the Western type by the fact that the soma (body of Christ) is not in full three-dimensional form, but in no more than three-quarter relief. It also bears the inscription INBI (the titulus that Pontius Pilate placed above the head of Jesus at the crucifixion) and the letters IC XC NIKA around the four arms of the cross. Orthodox pectoral crosses are almost always on chains of either silver or gold, sometimes with intricately worked links. Priest's crosses will often have an icon of Christ "Made Without Hands" at the top. This is the icon before which Orthodox Christians usually confess their sins. In Russian practice, the back of a priest's cross is usually inscribed with St. Paul's words to St. Timothy: "Be an example to the believers in speech and conduct, in love, in faith, in purity" (1 Tim. 4:12).

Orthodox pectoral crosses are awarded in several degrees (particularly in the Russian tradition):

- The Silver Cross is awarded to all priests by their bishop on the day of their ordination. This tradition began with the last Tsar, Nicholas II, who awarded a silver cross to every priest in the Russian Empire. Even after the fall of the Romanov Dynasty, the practice of awarding the Silver Cross to Russian priests at their ordination has continued to this day. This practice helps to distinguish priests from deacons or monks, all of whom wear the same type of riassa (cassock), and are otherwise indistinguishable when not vested. The Silver Cross is not enameled or decorated in any manner except for engraving or relief. Russian Orthodox priests do not wear the cross by right of their priesthood, but only by permission of their bishop. One way a bishop may punish one of his priests is to forbid him to wear the priest's cross.
- The next-ranking award is the Gold Cross. This is a simple gold cross, similar to the Silver Cross, and similarly without enameling or other decoration. The Gold Cross is worn by archpriests, abbots and abbesses as a mark of their office, and may be awarded by the bishop to other priests, both married and monastic, for distinguished service to the church.
- The highest pectoral cross, is With Decorations—that is, jeweled, and sometimes enameled—and normally has a depiction of an Eastern-style mitre at the top. This type of pectoral is also referred to as a "Jeweled Cross". This type of cross is worn by bishops, archimandrites and protopresbyters as a sign of their office, and may be awarded to other priests as well. All bishops are entitled to wear the pectoral cross with decorations, although most simply wear a Panagia when not vested for services.

When vesting before celebrating the Divine Liturgy, the pectoral cross is presented to the bishop who will bless the pectoral, cross himself with it, kiss the cross and put it on. Meanwhile, the Protodeacon, swinging the censer says the following prayer:

He who would be my disciple, let him deny himself, take up his cross and follow me (Matthew 16:24, etc.); always, now and ever, and unto the ages of ages. Amen.

A priest may be granted the right to wear a second pectoral cross.

A priest who has been given the pectoral cross will typically wear it at all times, whether vested or not.

In Russian practice, a nun who is not an abbess may also be granted the privilege of wearing a pectoral cross, as an honorary award (however, this award is not granted to monks who are not priests).

== Coptic Church ==
The pectoral cross worn by Coptic bishops and abbots is sometimes made from intricately worked leather, though metal pectorals are also used.

== See also ==
- Cross necklace
