= Chatelaine (chain) =

Decorative belt hook or clasp

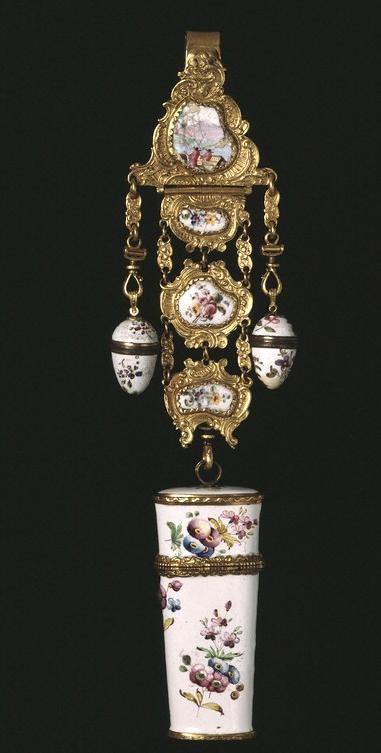
Chatelaine, 1765-1775 Victoria and Albert Museum no. C.492:1 to 7-1914

Chatelaine 1700s - Hallwyl Museum

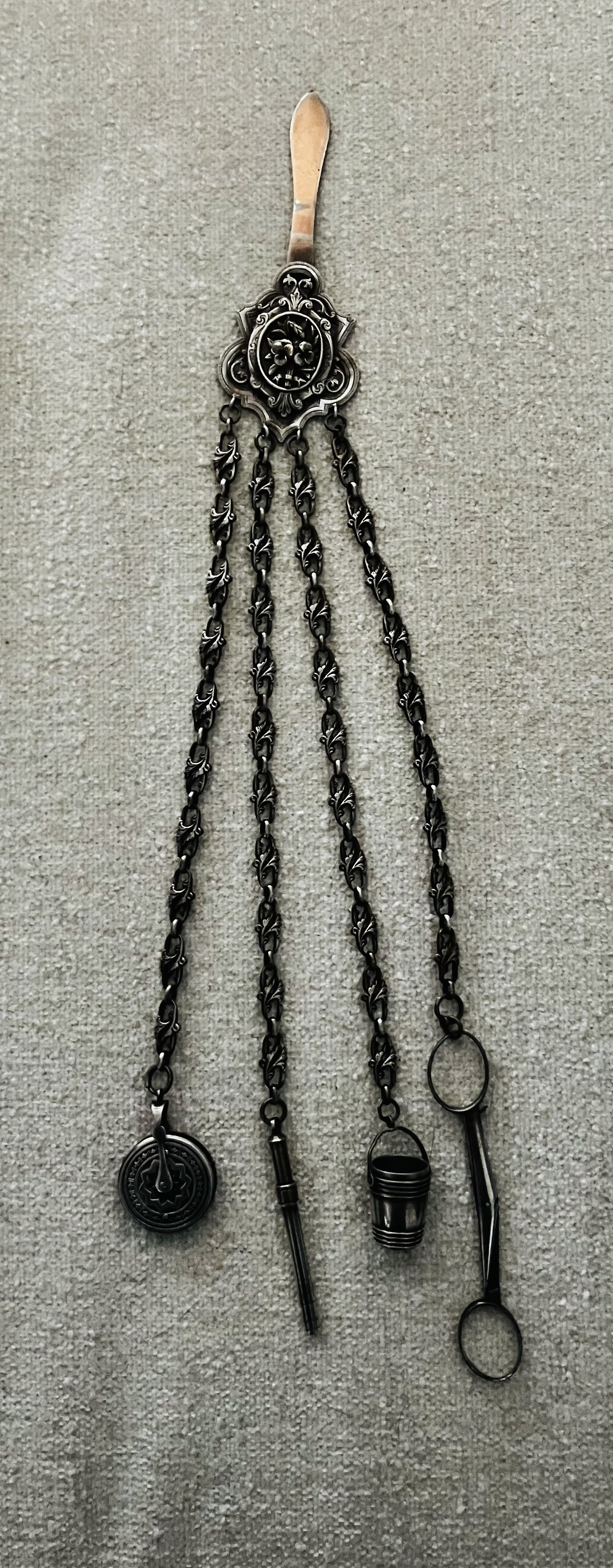
A chatelaine with (from L to R) a disc pincushion, pencil, thimble holder with thimble, and scissors.

A chatelaine is a decorative belt hook or clasp worn at the waist with a series of chains suspended from it. Each chain is mounted with useful household appendages such as scissors, thimbles, watches, keys, smelling salts, and household seals. A second type of chatelaine is worn around the neck, and is made of ribbon or fabric. In this case, the tools are found at the ends.

== Etymology ==
The name derives from the French term châtelaine, referring to the mistress of a castle or château, who would have worn a belt for her keys. The use of the term chatelaine to refer to a fashion accessory first appeared in the periodical The World of Fashion in April 1828, and was followed by another reference to the accessory using this term in January 1829. Prior to this, the term had only been used to refer to the lady of the castle.

The January 1829 issue documents the new meaning of this term:

...Châtelaine belongs to the female toilet; it consists in a bijou composed of various articles, and fastened together by a large chain of gold, which is fixed to the sash by a hook. A buckle, or a button falls over the skirt of the dress, to about the quarter of its length. The objects which terminate it are a very pretty gold key...a Gothic smelling bottle, in wrought gold, and some other little ornaments.

== History ==
In the ancient world Samnite women wore chatelaines that were rectangular and had a central section consisting of mail. A number of metal spirals were present across the chain's spiral. Each one had a perforated disk of metal. This kind of clothing originated from the Picentes. Ancient Roman ladies wore chatelaines with ear scoops, nail cleaners, and tweezers. Women in Roman Britain wore 'chatelaine brooches' from which toilet sets were suspended.

The remnants of chatelaines and chatelaine bags have been found in the graves of women in the seventh and eighth century in the United Kingdom. Often found with the chatelaine artifacts would be wire rings, beads, buckles, knives and tools.

There isn't clear evidence that there were pockets in men's clothings until the late 1600s. This made the chatelaine critical as a place to hang daily necessities such as keys, a tobacco container, and a sheathed knife. In the 17th century, women primarily hung needlework tools on their chatelaine, but they could also hang things such as a perfume bottle, keys, a mirror, tweezers, or their small tools.

In the 18th century, both men and women wore chatelaines for attaching general needs or more specialized or expensive items, such as watches, seals, and other small, expensive items. Chatelaines were worn by many housekeepers in the 19th century.

Chatelaine bags refer to bags suspended from a waistband by cord or chain, which were popular from the 1860s to the end of the 19th century.

Ribbon or fabric chatelaines were pinned to a blouse or waistband, or were draped around one's neck. Rings approximately the width of the ribbon, often 1/2" wide, were used to strengthen it when it was to be worn around one's neck. The tools were tied to the ends. This style of chatelaine is sometimes considered to emanate from the Shakers, but no evidence has been found to support that.

== Indicator of status ==
The chatelaine was also used as a woman's keychain in the 19th century to show the status of women in a wealthy household. The woman with the keys to all the many desks, chest of drawers, food hampers, pantries, storage containers, and many other locked cabinets was "the woman of the household". As such, she was the one who would direct the servants, housemaids, cooks and delivery servicemen and would open or lock the access to the valuables of the house, possessing total authority over who had access to what.

Frequently, this hostess was the senior woman of the house. When a woman married and moved into her father-in-law's house, her husband's mother would usually hold on to the keys. However, if the mother became a widow, the keys and their responsibilities and status were often passed to the oldest son's wife.

Younger women and daughters in the house often wanted the appearance of this responsibility, and would often wear decorative chatelaines with a variety of small objects in the place of keys, especially bright and glittering objects that could be used to start a conversation. In the case of the absence of a woman of the house, the controller of the keys was often a hired housekeeper.

== Gallery ==
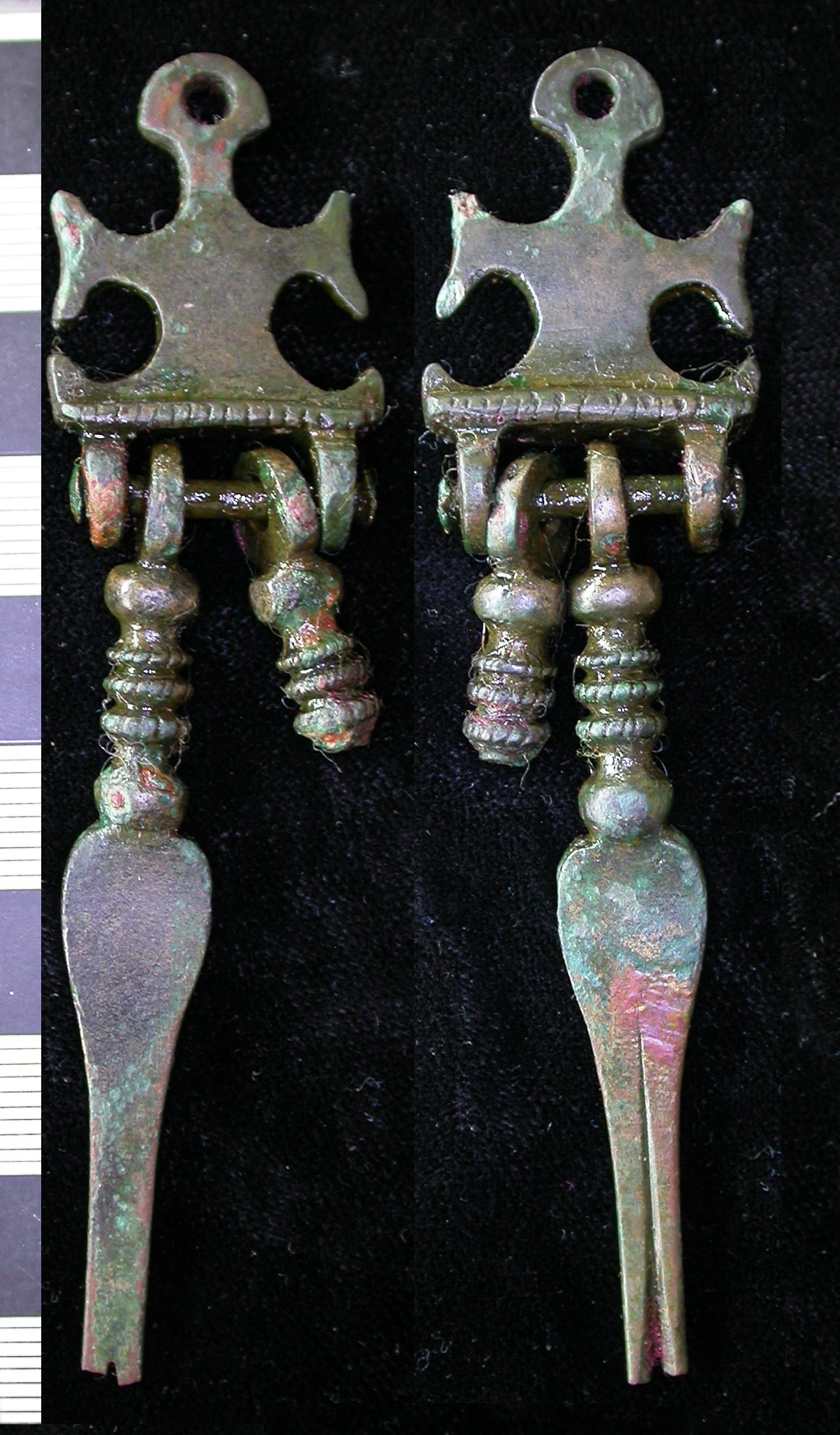
Incomplete Roman chatelaine

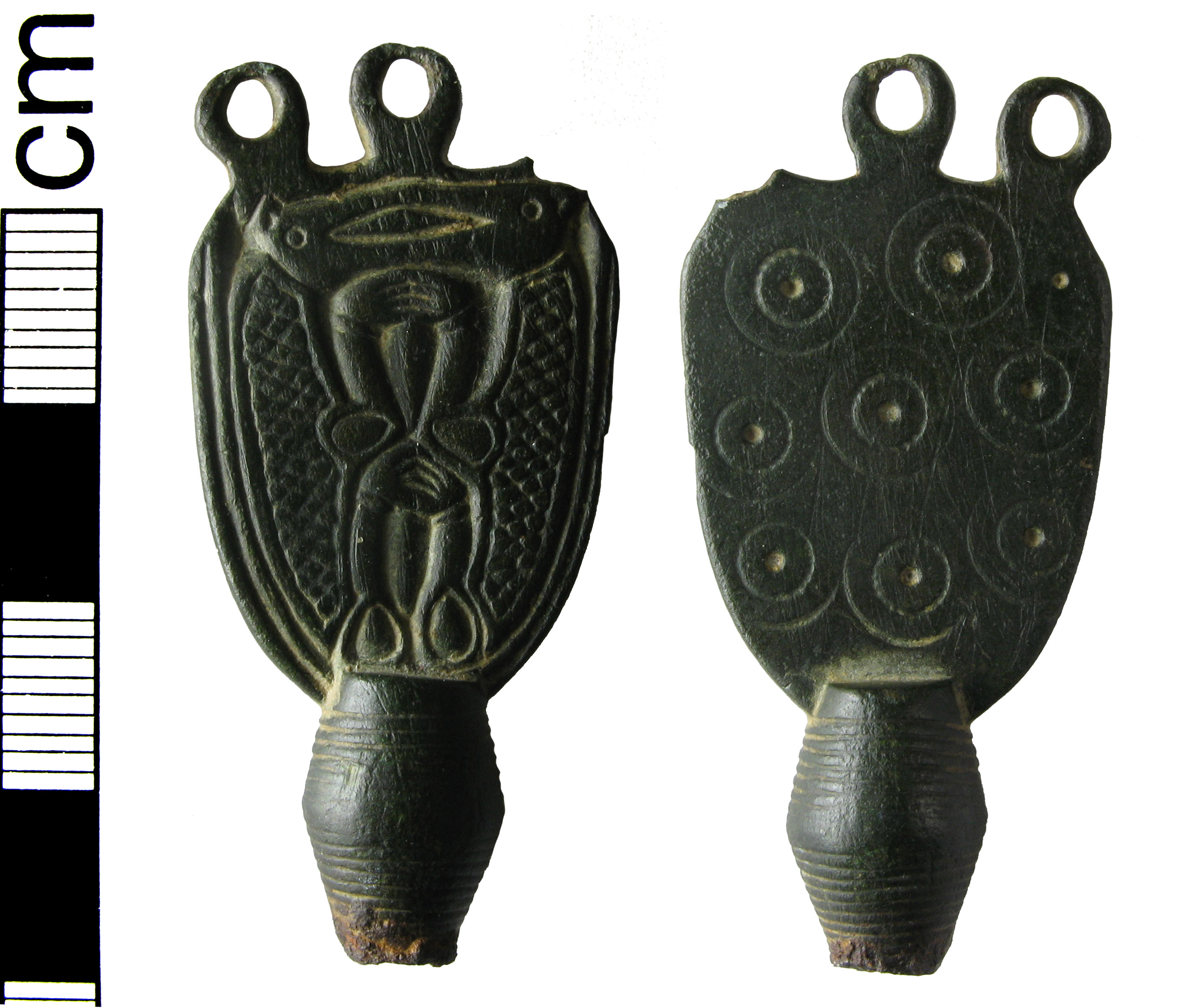
Early Medieval chatelaine fitting
