= Genetic history of the African diaspora =

Map of Africa and the African diaspora throughout the world

The genetic history of the African diaspora is composed of the overall genetic history of the African diaspora, within regions outside of Africa, such as North America, Central America, the Caribbean, South America, Europe, Asia, and Australia; this includes the genetic histories of African Americans, Afro-Canadians, Afro-Caribbeans, Afro-Latinos, Afro-Europeans, Afro-Asians, and African Australians.

== Overview ==
=== Prehistoric ===
The Sahara served as a trans-regional passageway and place of dwelling for people in Africa during various humid phases and periods throughout the history of Africa. As early as 11,000 years ago, Sub-Saharan West Africans, bearing macrohaplogroup L (e.g., L1b1a11, L1b1a6a, L1b1a8, L1b1a9a1, L2a1k, L3d1b1a), may have migrated through North Africa and into Europe, mostly into southern Europe (e.g., Iberia).

Amid the Green Sahara in Africa, the mutation for sickle cell originated in the Sahara or in the northwest forest region of western Central Africa (e.g., Cameroon) by at least 7,300 years ago, though possibly as early as 22,000 years ago. The ancestral sickle cell haplotype to modern haplotypes (e.g., Cameroon/Central African Republic and Benin/Senegal haplotypes) may have first arose in the ancestors of modern West Africans, bearing haplogroups E1b1a1-L485 and E1b1a1-U175 or their ancestral haplogroup E1b1a1-M4732. West Africans (e.g., Yoruba and Esan of Nigeria), bearing the Benin sickle cell haplotype, may have migrated through the northeastern region of Africa into the western region of Arabia. West Africans (e.g., Mende of Sierra Leone), bearing the Senegal sickle cell haplotype, may have migrated into Mauritania (77% modern rate of occurrence) and Senegal (100%); they may also have migrated across the Sahara, into North Africa, and from North Africa, into Southern Europe, Turkey, and a region near northern Iraq and southern Turkey. Some may have migrated and introduced the Senegal and Benin sickle cell haplotypes into Basra, Iraq, where both occur equally. West Africans, bearing the Benin sickle cell haplotype, may have migrated into the northern region of Iraq (69.5%), Jordan (80%), Lebanon (73%), Oman (52.1%), and Egypt (80.8%).

During the early period of the Holocene, Sub-Saharan African mitochondrial DNA was introduced into Europe, mostly in Iberia. West Africans probably migrated, across Sahelian Africa, North Africa, and the Strait of Gibraltar, into Europe, and introduced 63% of Sub-Saharan African mitochondrial DNA. Between 15,000 BP and 7000 BP, 86% of Sub-Saharan African mitochondrial DNA was introduced into Southwest Asia by East Africans, largely in the region of Arabia, which constitute 50% of Sub-Saharan African mitochondrial DNA in modern Southwest Asia.

In 4000 BP, there may have been a population that traversed from Africa (e.g., West Africa or West-Central Africa), through the Strait of Gibraltar, into the Iberian Peninsula, where admixing between Africans and Iberians (e.g., of northern Portugal, of southern Spain) occurred.

=== Historic ===
An African individual, who has been dated between 1st century CE and 3rd century CE as well as carried haplogroup H1, may have forcibly (via enslavement) or voluntarily migrated from the central Sahara or the Nile Valley (e.g., Sudan) to Rome.

During the modern period, West Africans introduced more than 75% of Sub-Saharan mitochondrial DNA into North America and Southern Africans introduced almost 15%. West Africans also introduced ~45% of Sub-Saharan African mitochondrial DNA into South America, whereas, Southern Africans, largely indigenous Angolans, introduced ~55%. During the modern period, West Africans introduced 75% of Sub-Saharan African mitochondrial DNA into Iberia and other parts of Europe, possibly by sea voyage. During the modern period, a greater number of West Africans introduced Sub-Saharan African mitochondrial DNA than East Africans. In the modern period, 68% of Sub-Saharan African mitochondrial DNA was introduced by East Africans and 22% was introduced by West Africans, which constitutes 50% of Sub-Saharan African mitochondrial DNA in modern Southwest Asia.

==== International Trade of Enslaved Africans ====
Regarding the Indian Ocean slave trade, Romuald (2017) states: "From the 8th to the 19th centuries, about four million people were captured from the shores of eastern Africa by Arab Muslim and Swahili traders. It has been suggested that slaves transported before the 16th century originated from the Horn of Africa, i.e., Nilotic or Afro-Asiatic speakers from present-day Ethiopia, whereas most Africans enslaved from the 18th century onward were Zanj, i.e., Bantu speakers of southeastern Africa." Regarding the Trans-Atlantic slave trade, Fortes-Lima (2021) states:

Between the 15th and the 19th century, around twelve million Africans were forcibly displaced from their countries to be enslaved (that means around 30,000 captives a year over three and a half centuries). Enslaved Africans were taken from African slaving coasts that stretched thousands of miles, from Senegal to Angola, and even round the Cape and on to Mozambique. The largest number (around 95%) of slaves arrived in Latin America, with ~43% disembarked in South America, ~52% in the Caribbean, while the remaining 5% arrived in what has become today the United States. This forced and massive migration of people radically changed the genetic landscape of present-day populations in the Americas...According to historical resources, from 1501 to 1867 enslaved Africans were embarked from eight major historical coastal regions in sub-Saharan Africa: 5.7% of the captives were from Senegambia, 3.2% from Sierra Leone, 2.7% from Windward Coast, 9.6% from Gold Coast, 16.1% from Bight of Benin, 12.3% from the Bight of Biafra, 46.3% from West Central Africa, and 4.1% from Southeast Africa. West Central Africa region (coastal region from present-day Gabon to Angola) was always the largest regional point for captives throughout most of the TAST [Trans-Atlantic Slave Trade] period, and much of the trade there was focused in present-day Angola. As the TAST expanded after 1641, slaving regions such as Gold Coast, the Bights of Benin and Biafra, and West Central Africa became more prominent than they had been before.

==== International Emigration of Modern Africans ====
===== Europe =====
In Lisbon, Portugal, 87% of Angolans, who were sampled in 2014, carried various haplogroups of Macro-haplogroup L (e.g., L0a, L0d, L1b, L1c, L2a, L2b, L2c, L3a, L3b, L3d, L3f, L4), whereas, other sampled Angolans carried different haplogroups (e.g., H, T, R0, K, U, J, M). In Lisbon, Portugal, out of 80 Guinea-Bissauns, who were sampled in 2017, 73 carried Macro-haplogroup L, 5 carried haplogroup U, one carried haplogroup M, and one carried haplogroup V. In Lisbon, Portugal, 81% of Mozambicans, who were sampled in 2017, carried various haplogroups of Macro-haplogroup L, whereas, 19% of the sampled Mozambicans carried different haplogroups (e.g., H, U, K, J1, M4, R0, T2).

== Americas ==
Out of 642 individuals from 15 populations among the African diaspora in the Americas sampled in 2016, some of which included individuals who self-identified as being of African descent, the ancestry of 328 African Americans were found to be 80% African, the ancestry of Afro-Jamaicans were found to be 89% African, and the ancestry of Puerto Ricans were found to be 27% African.

Due to their relative isolation from Europeans and Native Americans, Maroons retained and adapted their cultures from Africa. European colonial forces relinquished and recognized the territorial sovereignty of areas occupied by Maroons, such as Colombia, Jamaica, French Guiana, and Suriname. Alukus,Kwinti, Matawai, Ndjukas, Paramakas, and Saramakas, who are Maroons of Noir Marron, are the largest, autonomous group of Maroons in the Americas. Though Noir Marron groups and other groups among the African diaspora have been in the Americas for 400 years, the ancestry of Noir Marron individuals sampled in 2017 has shown that Maroons are 98% African, which is the highest degree of retained African ancestry among the African diaspora. Noir Marron Maroons were found to be genetically linked with Africans in the region of the Bight of Benin; in particular, there are strong genetic connections with Africans in Benin and a linguistic connection with Gbe speakers, such as the Fon people.

During the Holocene, 3% of Sub-Saharan African mitochondrial DNA is indicated to have been introduced into South America and 6% is indicated to have been introduced into North America. However, Sá et al. (2022) provided the following rationale: "This could be explained by statistical residuals from the recent lineages, but also from a couple of lineages whose founders in Africa were likely not detected, or due to minor errors in the sequences leading to overestimates of the age estimate of specific lineages." During the modern period, West Africans introduced more than 75% of Sub-Saharan mitochondrial DNA into North America and Southern Africans introduced almost 15%. West Africans also introduced ~45% of Sub-Saharan African mitochondrial DNA into South America, whereas, Southern Africans, largely indigenous Angolans, introduced ~55%.

=== North America ===
==== United States of America ====
===== Ancient DNA =====
At Avery's Rest in Delaware, 3 out of 11 individuals were African Americans, who were dated between 1675 CE and 1725 CE; one was of West African ancestry and carried haplogroups E1b1a-CTS2447 and L3e3b, another was of western Central African Bantu-speaking ancestry and carried E1b1a-Z5974 and L0a1a2, and another was of West African and East African ancestry and carried E1b1a-Z5974 and L3d2.

At a burial site in Delaware, enslaved African Americans, who were dated to the 17th century CE as well as had West African and Bantu ancestry from Central Africa and East Africa, carried haplogroups L3e3, L0a1a, and L3i2.

At Catoctin Furnace African American Cemetery, in Catoctin Furnace, Maryland, there were 27 African Americans found who were dated between 1774 CE and 1850 CE. One female individual, who was of 95.17% Sub-Saharan African and 1.69% European ancestry, carried haplogroup L3e1. One male individual, who was of 98.14% Sub-Saharan African ancestry, carried haplogroups E1b1a1a1a1c2c and L2a1+143+@16309. One male individual, who was of 83.73% Sub-Saharan African and 7.74% European ancestry, carried haplogroups E1b1a1a1a1c1b1 and L3e2a1b1. One male individual, who was of 88.47% Sub-Saharan African and 7.92% European ancestry, carried haplogroups R1b1a1b1a1a2c1 and L3e1. One male individual, who was of 84.94% Sub-Saharan African and 9.45% European ancestry, carried haplogroups E1b1a1a1a2a1a and L2a1+143+16189 (16192)+@16309. One female individual, who was of 97.02% Sub-Saharan African and 1.06% European ancestry, carried haplogroup L3f1b1a. One male individual, who was of 87.83% Sub-Saharan African and 8.23% European ancestry, carried haplogroups E1b1a1a1a1c1a1a3a1d1 and L3d1b3. One male individual, who was of 98.14% Sub-Saharan African ancestry, carried haplogroups E1b1a1a1a1a and L3e2a1b1. One male individual, who was of 53.75% Sub-Saharan African and 42.11% European ancestry, carried haplogroups R1b1a1b1a1a2c1a1h2a~ and L3f1b3. One female individual, who was of 98.12% Sub-Saharan African ancestry, carried haplogroup L2b1a3. One female individual, who was of 97.94% Sub-Saharan African ancestry, carried haplogroup L3e1a1a. One male individual, who was of 93.87% Sub-Saharan African and 2.58% European ancestry, carried haplogroups E1b1a1a1 and L3e1. One male individual, who was of 98.70% Sub-Saharan African ancestry, carried haplogroups E1b1a1a1a1c1b2a and L2a1a1. One male individual, who was of 97.01% Sub-Saharan African ancestry, carried haplogroups E1b1a1a1a1c1a1 and L3e2a1b1. One female individual, who was of 87.17% Sub-Saharan African and 6.93% European ancestry, carried haplogroup L2a1+143+16189 (16192)+@16309. One male individual, who was of 82.31% Sub-Saharan African and 10.24% European ancestry, carried haplogroups E1b1a1a1a1c1b and L3e2a1b1. One male individual, who was of 91.82% Sub-Saharan African and 5.31% European ancestry, carried haplogroups E1b1a1a1a1c1a1 and L3e2. One female individual, who was of 75.81% Sub-Saharan African and 21.44% European ancestry, carried haplogroup L4b2b1. One female individual, who was of 91.95% Sub-Saharan African and 4.47% European ancestry, carried haplogroup L3e2. One male individual, who was of 87.70% Sub-Saharan African and 4.93% European ancestry, carried haplogroups E2b and L2b1a3. One female individual, who was of 97.53% Sub-Saharan African and 0.21% European ancestry, carried haplogroup L2b1a3. One female individual, who was of 83.28% Sub-Saharan African and 10.72% European ancestry, carried haplogroup L3e2a1b1. One male individual, who was of 41.31% Sub-Saharan African and 53.59% European ancestry, carried haplogroups R1a1a1 and J1b1a1a. One male individual, who was of 92.70% Sub-Saharan African and 3.57% European ancestry, carried haplogroups A1b1 and L0a1b1a. One male individual, who was of 81.18% Sub-Saharan African and 14.86% European ancestry, carried haplogroups E1b1a1~ and L2c. One female individual, who was of 88.09% Sub-Saharan African and 5.44% European ancestry, carried haplogroup L2a1+143+16189 (16192)+@16309. One female individual, who was of 92.32% Sub-Saharan African and 4.05% European ancestry, carried haplogroup L2b1a3.

At a burial site in Schuyler Flatts, New York, 6 out of 14 individuals were African Americans, who were dated to the 18th century CE as well as of West African, western Central African, and Malagasy ancestry, carried various haplogroups; two carried haplogroup L2 (e.g., L2a1, L2b1), two carried haplogroup L3 (e.g., L3e2, L3e2b), one carried haplogroup M, and one carried haplogroup M7.

At an African American cemetery dated to the 18th century CE, in Portsmouth, New Hampshire, enslaved African Americans carried haplogroups U5 and U6.

At an Anson Street burial site dated to the 18th century CE, in Charleston, South Carolina, 29 enslaved African Americans carried the following haplogroups: one carried haplogroup L0 (e.g., L0a1), six carried haplogroup L1 (e.g., L1b, L1c), nine carried L2 (e.g., L2a, L2b, L2c), twelve carried L3 (e.g., L3e, L3b, L3d, L3f), and one carried U6 (e.g., U6a5).

At an Anson Street burial site, in Charleston, South Carolina, there were 18 African Americans found who were dated to the 18th century CE. Banza was of western Central African ancestry and carried haplogroups E1b1a-CTS668 and L3e3b1. Lima was of West African ancestry and carried haplogroups E1b1a-M4671 and L3b3. Kuto was of western Central African ancestry and carried haplogroups E1b1a-CTS2198 and L2a1a2. Anika was of Sub-Saharan African ancestry and carried haplogroups E1b1a-CTS6126 and L2b1. Nana was of West African ancestry and carried haplogroup L2b3a. Zimbu was of western Central African ancestry and carried haplogroups E1b1a-CTS5497 and L3e1e. Wuta was of Sub-Saharan African ancestry and carried haplogroups E1b1a-CTS7305 and L3e2b+152. Daba was of West African ancestry and carried haplogroups E1b1a-M4273 and L2c. Fumu was of Sub-Saharan African ancestry and carried haplogroups B2a1a-Y12201 and L3e2b+152. Lisa was of West African ancestry and carried haplogroups E1b1a-Z6020 and H100. Ganda was of West African ancestry and carried haplogroups E1b1a-CTS5612 and L1c1c. Coosaw was of West African and Native American ancestry and carried haplogroups E2b1a-CTS2400 and A2. Kidzera was of western Central African ancestry and carried haplogroup L2a1a2c. Pita was of Sub-Saharan African ancestry and carried haplogroups E1b1a-M4287 and L3e2b. Tima was of western Central African ancestry and carried haplogroup L3e1e. Jode was of Sub-Saharan African ancestry and carried haplogroups E1b1a-CTS4975 and L2a1a2c. Ajana was of western Central African ancestry and carried haplogroup L2a1I. Isi was of western Central African ancestry and carried haplogroup L3e2a.

In Maryland, a tobacco pipe dated to the 19th century CE was determined to have been used by an enslaved African American woman, who was of Mende ancestry, and carried haplogroup L3e. She may have lived for a period of time between 1736 CE and 1864 CE.

At Avondale Burial Place, in Bibb County, Georgia, utilized between 1820 CE and 1950 CE, 18 out of 20 individuals were determined to be African American, as they carried the following haplogroups: one L0, two with L1, seven with L2, seven with L3, and one with U6.

In Philadelphia, Pennsylvania, an individual of West African ancestry, who died of cholera during a cholera pandemic in 1849 CE, carried haplogroup L3d1b3.

===== Y-Chromosomal DNA =====
60% of African Americans, who were sampled in 2007, were of haplogroup E1b1a, within which 22.9% were particularly of haplogroup E-M2; they also possessed numerous SNPs (e.g., U175, U209, U181, U290, U174, U186, and U247).

An African American man, who was sampled in 2013, carried haplogroup A00, which likely dates back to 338,000 BP, and is a haplogroup shared with the Mbo people.

Torres et al. (2012) states: "One African American population, those from South Carolina, cluster with the African populations. Notably, the South Carolina population falls nearest to the Grain Coast populations. Ethnohistorical records indicate a relationship between African Americans within this region of the United States and West Africans from Senegal, Gambia, and Sierra Leone. Based on such records it has been suggested that many African Americans within South Carolina originate from the Grain Coast region of West Africa. Furthermore, Africans from this region were sought-after and imported to the Americas for their knowledge of rice cultivation."

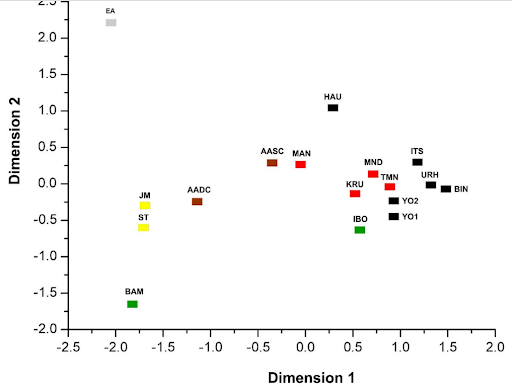
African-Americans from South Carolina cluster with Senegalese Mandinka

===== X-Chromosomal DNA =====
Due to the X-chromosomes in African Americans having high concentrations of ancestry from Africa, this coheres with the understanding of there being an asymmetric flow of genes from European males to African females; consequently, this can be understood as being the result of enslaved African American females being raped by European males.

===== Mitochondrial DNA =====
African Americans, who were sampled in 2015, carried various haplogroups of macro-haplogroup L (e.g., L0, L1, L1b, L1c, L2, L2a, L2b, L2c, L2e, L3, L3b, L3d, L3e, L3f, L3h, L3x, L4). 10.2% of African Americans carried haplogroup L1b and 19.8% of African Americans carried haplogroup L2a.

Stefflova et al. (2011) states: "Ancestry from Guinea Bissau-Mali-Senegal-Sierra Leone predominates in other United States African American populations compared to Philadelphia alone (43% vs. 22%). Despite the differences in coverage and sampling, this pattern may be attributed to a significant contribution of slaves from British colonies in Africa to the British-controlled Philadelphia region compared to a more diverse contribution to other parts of the United States from French, Spanish, and Dutch colonies. Additional possible contributing factors include the different periods of the slave trade influencing the Philadelphian population compared to the other parts of the United States. However, these remain tentative conclusions since we cannot rule out a contribution from sampling bias. Another example of these differences is the Gullah/Geechee populations from South Carolina/Georgia that have >78% of their source from the Guinea Bissau-Mali-Senegal-Sierra Leone region (data not shown), corresponding to the "Rice coast" around Sierra Leone that was the major source of slaves drawn by the United States in the later period of the slave trade." The plurality of the African component of African Americans was found to be from West African populations from Senegambia and the Rice Coast (Guinea Bissau-Mali-Senegal-Sierra Leone), followed by Central Africans from the Congo and Angola, and lastly West-Central Africans (Nigeria-Niger-Cameroon).

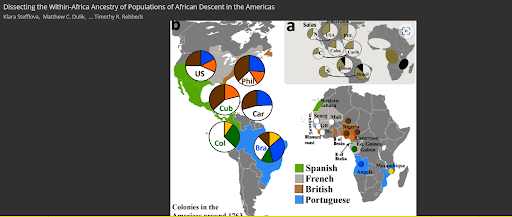
Regional Ancestry of the Afro Diaspora

===== Autosomal DNA =====
In addition to being found to have 2.6% (±2.1%) Native American and 10.6% (±2.3%) European ancestry, African-Americans who were sampled in 2008, were found to be 86.8% (±2.1%) West African. African Americans were found to be more closely genetically related to Yoruba people than East Africans (e.g., Luhya, Maasai). Murray et al. (2010) also states: "In the analysis of AIMs [Ancestry Informative Markers], African Americans were most distant from Yorubans, followed by the Luhya, and then the Maasai and were closest to Barbadians." Out of 5,244 African Americans sampled in 2017, their ancestry was found to range between 73% and 78% African; in particular, they were found to be of West African and western Central African ancestry. Approximately 7% of their ancestry derives from Windward Coast, 13% from Senegambia, 30% from Angola, and nearly 50% from Benin, western Nigeria, and Togo. Additionally, 4.8% of their ancestry derives from Bantu peoples and 16% derives from African rainforest hunter-gatherers.

Tishkoff et al. (2009) via "Supervised STRUCTURE analysis [inferred] African American ancestry from global training populations, including both Bantu (Lemande) and non-Bantu (Mandinka) Niger-Kordofanian–speaking populations. These results were generally consistent with the unsupervised STRUCTURE analysis (table S6) and demonstrate that most African Americans have high proportions of both Bantu (~0.45 mean) and non-Bantu (~0.22 mean) Niger-Kordofanian ancestry, concordant with diasporas originating as far west as Senegambia and as far south as Angola and South Africa." Moderate to modest amounts of Chadic, Fulani, Nilo-Saharan, Cushitic, and Sandawe ancestry were also inferred; this is consistent with the phylogenetic analysis of Tishkoff et al. (2009), wherein African-Americans were found to share more recent common ancestry with a clade including Hausa and Fulani from Cameroon, in addition to Chadic and Central Sudanic speakers such as the Mada, Sara, and Laka.

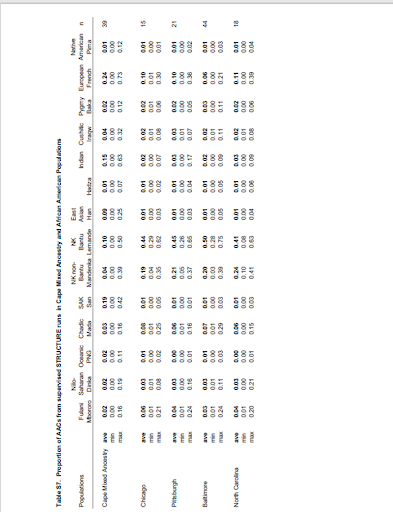
Structured Analysis African-Americans and Caped Mixed Ancestry

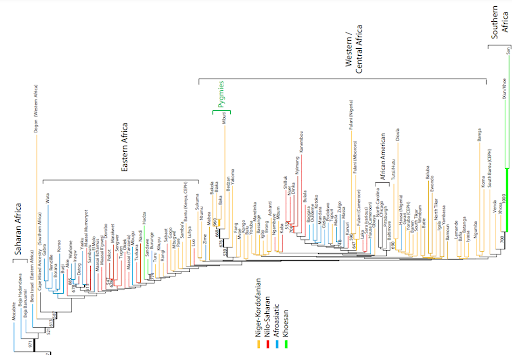
African-American phylogenetic relationships

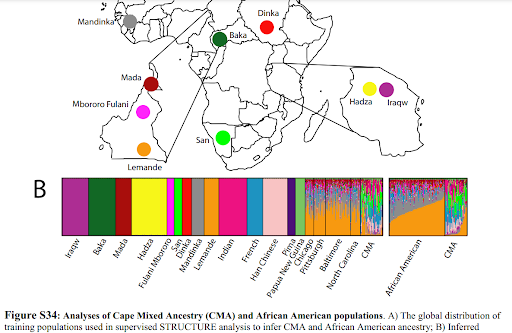
Visualization of African-American Ancestry

===== Medical DNA =====
The African ancestry in African Americans have often been connected to the risk alleles and genetic components of diseases predominant among African Americans, such as blood disorders, hypertension, progressive kidney failure, and type 2 diabetes.

African Americans, who have a high rate of occurrence of type 2 diabetes, have a few gene variants (e.g., several SNPs in IGF2 and HLA-B genes; the SNP, rs7903146, within the TCF7L2 gene; the intergenic SNP, rs7560163, located between the RBM43 gene and RND3 gene) that are strongly associated with type 2 diabetes.

The rate of occurrence for hypertension in African Americans is 39%. Several genes (e.g., EVX1-HOXA, PLEKHG1, RSPO3, SOX6, ULK4), which contributes to the signaling pathway for nitric oxide – a pathway connected with multiple functions (e.g., endothelian function, heart contraction, vasodilatation) relating to hypertension – and thus, are associated with hypertension. Hypertension is also associated with the NPR3 gene. These genes have all been connected with hypertension in African Americans.

Risk allele variants G1 and G2 are associated with chronic kidney disease, which are common among populations of Sub-Saharan African ancestry; the G2 variant occurs at a 3%-8% rate among populations of western Central African ancestry and origin.

Some infectious diseases are protected against due to African ancestry. Hereditary blood disorders, such as sickle cell anemia and thalassemia, produce an effect on the development of hemoglobin, which, consequently, prevents the reproduction of malaria parasites within the erythrocyte. Populations with West African ancestry, including among the African diaspora brought via the Trans-Atlantic slave trade, tend to have occurrences of sickle cell anemia and thalassemia. The Sickle Hemoglobin S trait occurs in 8% of African Americans, and, generally, sickle cell anemia.occurs in 0.02% of African Americans.

African Americans have as much as 65% of the Duffy-null genotype. The cancer medicine, azathioprine, regarding its safety and when it should be discontinued, was found to be unsuitable and possibly damaging to African Americans, as the standard range was based on "normal" ranges for Europeans; the distinct genetic data from African Americans (e.g., Duffy-null phenotype) might provide a different explanation for neutropenia.

=== Caribbean ===
A majority of Afro-Caribbean people descend from peoples in the regions of West Africa and western Central Africa. In particular, their genetic ancestry, to some extent, derives from peoples in the region of Angola, but more so, from peoples in regions, such as the Bight of Benin, Bight of Biafra, Cameroon, and Ghana. Additionally, between the late 19th century CE and early 20th century CE, some Haitians migrated into Cuba, thereby, resulting in the addition of ancestry from Africa.

==== Barbados ====
===== Autosomal DNA =====
In addition to being found to have 0.2% (±2.0%) Native American and 10.2% (±2.2%) European ancestry, Afro-Barbadians, who were sampled in 2008, were found to be 89.6% (±2.0%) West African. In addition to being found to have 6.7% Asian and 15.9% European ancestry, Afro-Barbadians, who were sampled in 2010, were found to be 77.4% African. Afro-Barbadians were found to be more closely genetically related to Yoruba people than East Africans. In addition to being found to have 6% Asian and 16% European ancestry, Afro-Barbadians, who were sampled in 2013, were found to be 77% African; most of the African ancestry of Afro-Barbadianswere found to derive from the Yoruba people. In addition to being found to have 0% Native American and 16% European (e.g., Northern/Western) ancestry, Afro-Barbadians, who were sampled in 2016 and self-reported their African ancestry, were found to be 84% African (e.g., Yoruba). The ancestry of Afro-Barbadians, who were sampled in 2017, were found to be 88% African.

==== Dominica ====
===== Autosomal DNA =====
In addition to being found to have 16.2% (±10.4%) Native American and 28.1% (±12.3%) European ancestry, Afro-Dominicans, who were sampled in 2013, were found to be 55.6% (±16.1%) West African.

==== Dominican Republic ====
===== Autosomal DNA =====
In addition to being found to have 9% Native American and 52% European (e.g., Northern/Western) ancestry, Afro-Dominicans, who were sampled in 2016 and self-reported their African ancestry, were found to be 38% African (e.g., Yoruba).

==== Grenada ====
===== Autosomal DNA =====
In addition to being found to have 6.8% (±4.6%) Native American and 12.1% (±11.2%) European ancestry, Afro-Grenadians, who were sampled in 2013, were found to be 81.1% (±11.3%) West African.

==== Haiti ====
===== Y-Chromosomal DNA =====
Afro-Haitians, who were sampled in 2012, were found to have carried haplogroup E1b1a-M2 (63.4%), within which were more specific sub-haplogroups, such as haplogroups E1b1a7-M191 (26.8%) and E1b1a8-U175 (26%), and subgroups within those sub-haplogroups, such as E1b1a7a-U174 (26.8%) and E1b1a8a-P278 (13%); there were also various sub-haplogroups of haplogroup R1b (e.g., R1b1b1-M269, R1b1b1a1b2-M529, R1b1b1a1b*-S116, R-M306, R1b2*-V88) as well as haplogroup R1a-M198.

===== Autosomal DNA =====
The ancestry of Afro-Haitians, who were sampled in 2013, were found to be 84% African.

==== Jamaica ====
===== Y-Chromosomal DNA =====
Afro-Jamaicans, who were sampled in 2012, were found to have carried haplogroup E1b1a-M2 (60.4%), within which were more specific sub-haplogroups, such as E1b1a7-M191 (27.7%) and E1b1a8-U175 (23.3%), and subgroups within those sub-haplogroups, such as E1b1a7a-U174 (25.8%) and E1b1a8a-P278 (11.3%); there were also various sub-haplogroups of haplogroup R1b (e.g., R1b1b1-M269, R1b1b1a1b2-M529, R1b1b1a1b*-S116, R-M306, R1b2*-V88) as well as haplogroup R1a-M198.

===== Mitochondrial DNA =====
Afro-Jamaicans, who were sampled in 2012, were found to have mostly (97.5%) carried various forms of macro-haplogroup L as well as various other haplogroups (e.g., U6, A2, B2, D4, H, J, U2, M).

===== Autosomal DNA =====
In addition to being found to have 3.2% (±3.1%) Native American and 12.4% (±3.5%) European ancestry, Afro-Jamaicans, who were sampled in 2008, were found to be 84.4% (±3.1%) West African. In addition to being found to have 8.3% (±13.5%) Native American and 10.3% (±8.4%) European ancestry, Afro-Jamaicans, who were sampled in 2013, were found to be 81.4% (±15.9%) West African. The ancestry of Afro-Jamaicans, who were sampled in 2016, were found to be 89% African. In addition to being found to have 1% Native American and 11% European (e.g., Northern/Western) ancestry, Afro-Jamaicans, who were sampled in 2016 and self-reported their African ancestry, were found to be 89% African (e.g., Yoruba).

==== Puerto Rico ====
===== Autosomal DNA =====
In addition to being found to have 12% Native American and 61% European (e.g., Northern/Western) ancestry, Afro-Puerto Ricans, who were sampled in 2016 and self-reported their African ancestry, were found to be 27% African (e.g., Yoruba).

==== Saint Kitts and Nevis ====
===== Autosomal DNA =====
In addition to being found to have 5.8% (±2.9%) Native American and 8.2% (±5.4%) European ancestry, Afro-Kittitians, who were sampled in 2013, were found to be 85.9% (±5.7%) West African.

==== Saint Lucia ====
===== Autosomal DNA =====
In addition to being found to have 7.5% (±7.3%) Native American and 17.9% (±12.5%) European ancestry, Afro–Saint Lucians, who were sampled in 2013, were found to be 74.5% (±15.3%) West African.

==== Saint Martin ====
===== Ancient DNA =====
In Zoutsteeg, Philipsburg, Saint Martin, three enslaved Africans of [est African (e.g., Nigeria, Ghana) and western Central African (e.g., Bantu peoples of northern Cameroon) ancestry, who are estimated to date between 1660 CE and 1688 CE, were found; one carried haplogroups R1b1c-V88 and L3b1a, another carried haplogroup L3d1b, and the last carried haplogroup L2a1f. A man and woman may have been from Ghana or Nigeria, and a man may have been from among the Bantu peoples of Cameroon, Republic of the Congo, and Democratic Republic of the Congo.

==== Saint Vincent ====
===== Autosomal DNA =====
The ancestry of the Garifuna in Saint Vincent, who were sampled in 2013, were found to be 70% African. The ancestry of the Garifuna of Saint Vincent, who were sampled in 2019, were found to be 70% African. In addition to being found to have 6.5% (±6.4%) Native American and 12.8% (±12.9%) European ancestry, Afro-Vincentians, who were sampled in 2013, were found to be 80.6% (±16.4%) West African.

==== Trinidad and Tobago ====
===== Autosomal DNA =====
In addition to being found to have 9.2% (±8.7%) Native American and 15.8% (±11.5%) European ancestry, Afro-Trinidadians, who were sampled in 2013, were found to be 75.0% (±16.6%) West African.

==== Virgin Islands ====
===== Saint Thomas =====
====== Autosomal DNA ======
In addition to being found to have 2.6% (±2.1%) Native American and 10.6% (±2.3%) European ancestry, Afro–Virgin Islanders from Saint Thomas, who were sampled in 2008, were found to be 86.8% (±2.2%) West African. In addition to being found to have 5.6% (±4.9%) Native American and 16.9% (±21.1%) European ancestry, Afro–Virgin Islanders from Saint Thomas, who were sampled in 2013, were found to be 77.4% (±21.9%) West African.

=== Central America ===
==== Belize ====
===== Autosomal DNA =====
In addition to being found to have 29.0% Native American and 1.0% European ancestry, some Afro-Belizeans from Livingston, who were sampled in 1981, were found to be 70.0% African. In addition to being found to have 17.4% Native American and 2.7% European ancestry, some Afro-Belizeans from Stann Creek, who were sampled in 1983, were found to be 79.9% African. In addition to being found to have 24.1% Native American and 4.9% European ancestry, some Afro-Belizeans from Punta Gorda, who were sampled in 1983, were found to be 71.0% African. In addition to being found to have 23.9% Native American and 0.5% European ancestry, some Afro-Belizeans from Hopkins, who were sampled in 1983, were found to be 75.6% African. In addition to being found to have 7.4% Native American and 17.1% European ancestry, some Afro-Belizeans from Stann Creek, who were sampled in 1983, were found to be 75.5% African. In addition to being found to have 5.2% Native American and 42.8% European ancestry, some Afro-Belizeans from Punta Gorda, who were sampled in 1983, were found to be 52.0% African. In addition to being found to have 8.6% Native American and 16.7% European ancestry, some Afro-Belizeans from Belize City, who were sampled in 1983, were found to be 74.7% African.

==== Honduras ====
===== Autosomal DNA =====
In addition to being found to have 17% Native American and 2% European (e.g., Northern/Western) ancestry, Afro-Hondurans, who were sampled in 2016 and self-reported their African ancestry, were found to be 81% African (e.g., Yoruba).

==== Mexico ====
===== Ancient DNA =====
At a San Jose de los Naturales Royal Hospital burial site, in Mexico City, Mexico, three enslaved West Africans of West African and Southern African ancestry, dated between 1453 CE and 1626 CE, 1450 CE and 1620 CE, and 1436 CE and 1472 CE, were found; one carried haplogroups E1b1a1a1c1b/E-M263.2 and L1b2a, another carried haplogroups E1b1a1a1d1/E-P278.1/E-M425 and L3d1a1a, and the last carried haplogroups E1b1a1a1c1a1c/E-CTS8030 and L3e1a1a. Human leukocyte antigen alleles further confirm that the individuals were of Sub-Saharan African origin.

At the 11–1 burial site, in Campeche, Mexico, a West African woman, who was in her early twenties and dated to the late 17th century CE, carried haplogroup L3.

===== Medical DNA =====
At La Concepción chapel and Hospital Real de San José de los Naturales, in Mexico City, enslaved Africans, who carried haplogroup L, were sampled for viral genomes. From among the sampled individuals, who may have died between 1472–1625 CE and 1442–1608 CE, the ancient DNA of the viruses were able to be were able to be reconstructed. Due to the brutality of the Middle Passage and enslavement of the first generation of Africans, the transmission of the Hepatitis B virus and human parvovirus B19 from Africa to the Americas was facilitated by Spanish slavers and colonists; while this has not been established as causally connected, it is at least associated with the Cocoliztli epidemics.

=== South America ===
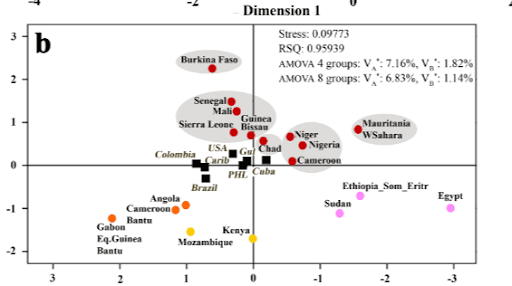
MTDNA of the Afro-Diaspora

==== Bolivia ====
===== Autosomal DNA =====
The ancestry of Afro-Bolivians from the Yungas Valley, who were sampled in 2016, were found to be 80% African.

==== Brazil ====
===== Ancient DNA =====
At Pretos Novos Cemetery, in Rio de Janeiro, Brazil, 4 out 16 carried M. tuberculosis and 3 out of 16 carried haplogroups L3e2, L3d1, and L1c2; thus, indicating that the individuals, who were buried in the cemetery between the 18th century CE and the 19th century CE, were born in West Africa and/or western Central Africa, and soon died after reaching Rio de Janeiro.

===== Autosomal DNA =====
The average ancestry of Afro-Brazilians were found to be 70.8% African.

==== Colombia ====
===== Y-Chromosomal DNA =====
At Palenque, in addition to haplogroup R1b being found, including haplogroup R1b-V88, haplogroup E1b1a-M2 was found, which includes its sub-lineages (e.g., U175, U181, U290). While 37.9% was unable to be identified, the following African paternal haplogroups were able to be identified at Palenque: E1b1a-M2* (xM154, M191) (22.4% rate of occurrence) likely originates near Bight of Benin, E1b1a-M2* (xM154, M191) (12.1%) likely originates near Loango/Angola, B2a-M150* (xM109) (5.2%) likely originates in Loango, R1b-V88 (6.9%) likely originates near Bight of Benin/Loango, E1b1b-M35* (xM78, M81, M123, V6, M293) (5.2%) likely originates near Senegambia/Bight of Benin, Y-MRCA* (xM13,SRY10831.1) (3.4%) likely originates in Upper Guinea, E1a-M33 (1.7%) likely originates in Upper Guinea, E1a-M33 (1.7%) likely originates near Bight of Benin/Bight of Biafra, E1b1a-M191 (1.7%) likely originates near Loango/Angola, and E1b1a-M191 (1.7%) likely originates in Loango.

===== Mitochondrial DNA =====
While 67.1% was unable to be identified, the following African maternal haplogroups were able to be identified at Palenque: L1b1a1'4 (8.9% rate of occurrence) likely originates near Senegambia/Upper Guinea, L1c3a1b (6.3%) likely originates near Gold Coast/Angola, L0a1a+200 (1.3%) likely originates near Upper Guinea/Bight of Benin, L2b1a (1.3%) likely originates near Bight of Benin/Angola, L2d+16129 (1.3%) likely originates in Angola, L3e1d (12.7%) likely originates in Angola, and L3f1b+16365 (1.3%) likely originates in Gold Coast.

===== Autosomal DNA =====
In 2016, linguistic evidence (e.g., Kikongo influence and remnants from the early history of Palenque found in Palenquero), which was also compatible with a diverse origin for African Y-chromosome, supported Bakongo people being the founding population of Palenque; in 2020, the Yombe people of the Republic of the Congo were found to be genetically closest with the people of Palenque.

In addition to being found to have 28% Native American and 39% European (e.g., Northern/Western) ancestry, Afro-Colombians, who were sampled in 2016 and self-reported their African ancestry, were found to be 33% African (e.g., Yoruba). The average ancestry of Afro-Colombians were found to be 76.8% African.

===== Medical DNA =====
Based on 30 genetic markers, African ancestry was shown to provide statistically significant protection against Dengue Fever in Colombians.

==== Peru ====
===== Autosomal DNA =====
The ancestry of Afro-Peruvians, who were sampled in 2018, were found to be 78% African.

==== Suriname ====
===== Ancient DNA =====
In Batavia, Suriname, an enslaved West African (e.g., Mali) with some Middle Eastern ancestry, who died more than a century ago, carried a strain of M. leprae and haplogroup L3.

== Atlantic Ocean ==
=== North Atlantic Ocean ===
==== Macaronesia ====
===== Canary Islands =====
====== Ancient DNA ======
At Finca Clavijo, in Gran Canaria, Canary Islands, nine individuals, dated between 15th century CE and 17th century CE, who were of Sub-Saharan African and North African/Moorish origin, were enslaved and forcibly brought from Africa (e.g., Morocco, Senegal River); the Sub-Saharan African individuals carried haplogroups L1b, L1c, and L2a1, and the Moorish individuals carried haplogroups H, HV/R, R0, I, and U6b1.

=== South Atlantic Ocean ===
==== Saint Helena, Ascension and Tristan da Cunha ====
===== Saint Helena =====
====== Ancient DNA ======
In Saint Helena, 20 freed Africans, who were dated to the 19th century CE, were also of western Central African (e.g., Bantu peoples of Gabon and Angola) ancestry. One female individual carried haplogroup L1b1a10b. One female individual carried haplogroup L2a1f. One female individual carried haplogroup L2a1a3c. One male individual carried haplogroups E1b1a1a1a2a1a3b1d and L1c3a. One male individual carried haplogroups E1b1a1a1a1c1a1a and L0a1b2a. One male individual carried haplogroups E1b1a1a1a2a1a3b1a2a2 and L0a1e. One male individual carried haplogroups E1b1a1a1a2a1a3b1 and L2a1f1. One male individual carried haplogroups E1b1a1 and L3. One male individual carried haplogroups E1b1a1a1a2a1a3b1d and L3e1e. One male individual carried haplogroups E1b1a1a1a2a1a3a1d and L3e3b2. One male individual carried haplogroups E1b1a1a1a1c1a1a3 and L3e1a3a. One male individual carried haplogroups E1b1a1a1a2a1a3b1a2a2 and L2b1a. One male individual carried haplogroups E1b1a1a1a2a1a3b1 and L3f1b1a. One male individual carried haplogroups E1b1a1a1a2a1a3b1d1c1a and L3d3a1. One male individual carried haplogroups B2a1a1a1 and L3e2b1. One male individual carried haplogroups E1b1a1a1a2a1a3b1d1c1a and L2a1f. One male individual carried haplogroups E1b1a1a1a1c1a1a3a1c1 and L3e1d1a. One male individual carried haplogroups E1b1a1a1a2a1a3a1d and L1b1a10. One male individual carried haplogroups E1b1a1a1a1c1a1a3a1c and L2a1f1. One male individual carried haplogroups E1b1a1a1a1c1a1 and L2b1a. An enslaved African American man and woman, from the 18th century CE Anson Street burial site in Charleston, South Carolina, who carried haplogroup L3e1e, shared this haplogroup with freed Africans in Saint Helena. Based on those who were present among enslaved Africans, the ratio of males-to-females supports the conclusion of there being a strong selection bias for males in the latter period of the Trans-Atlantic Slave Trade. Consequently, due to this study on the freed Africans of Saint Helena, among other studies, greater genetic insights have been made into the Trans-Atlantic Slave Trade and its effects on the demographics of Africa.

== Eurasia ==
Amid the Green Sahara in Africa, the mutation for sickle cell originated in the Sahara or in the northwest forest region of western Central Africa (e.g., Cameroon) by at least 7,300 years ago, though possibly as early as 22,000 years ago. The ancestral sickle cell haplotype to modern haplotypes (e.g., Cameroon/Central African Republic and Benin/Senegal haplotypes) may have first arose in the ancestors of modern West Africans, bearing haplogroups E1b1a1-L485 and E1b1a1-U175 or their ancestral haplogroup E1b1a1-M4732. West Africans (e.g., Yoruba and Esan of Nigeria), bearing the Benin sickle cell haplotype, may have migrated through the northeastern region of Africa into the western region of Arabia. West Africans (e.g., Mende of Sierra Leone), bearing the Senegal sickle cell haplotype, may have migrated into Mauritania (77% modern rate of occurrence) and Senegal (100%); they may also have migrated across the Sahara, into North Africa, and from North Africa, into Southern Europe, Turkey, and a region near northern Iraq and southern Turkey. Some may have migrated and introduced the Senegal and Benin sickle cell haplotypes into Basra, Iraq, where both occur equally. West Africans, bearing the Benin sickle cell haplotype, may have migrated into the northern region of Iraq (69.5%), Jordan (80%), Lebanon (73%), Oman (52.1%), and Egypt (80.8%).

=== Europe ===
As early as 11,000 years ago, Sub-Saharan West Africans, bearing macrohaplogroup L (e.g., L1b1a11, L1b1a6a, L1b1a8, L1b1a9a1, L2a1k, L3d1b1a), may have migrated through North Africa and into Europe, mostly into southern Europe (e.g., Iberia).

During the early period of the Holocene, Sub-Saharan African mitochondrial DNA was introduced into Europe, mostly in Iberia. West Africans probably migrated, across Sahelian Africa, North Africa, and the Strait of Gibraltar, into Europe, and introduced 63% of Sub-Saharan African mitochondrial DNA. During the modern period, West Africans introduced 75% of Sub-Saharan African mitochondrial DNA into Iberia and other parts of Europe, possibly by sea voyage.

==== Croatia ====
===== Ancient DNA =====
At Dalmatia, in Hvar, Croatia, an adult male individual, dated between the 3rd century CE and the 5th century CE, carried haplogroups E1b1a1a1a1c1b2a2 and HV.

==== England ====
===== Ancient DNA =====
At Updown, in Kent, England, Updown Girl, who was between 11 and 13 years of age, and dated to the 7th century CE, carried haplogroup U5b1c2b and autosomal ancestry related to West Africans, such as Esan, Mandenka, Mende, and Yoruba. She was also buried alongside a paternal grandparent, with completely Sub-Saharan West African ancestry. More specifically, she may descend from a southern Sahelian West African who likely departed from West Africa between the mid-6th century CE and the early 7th century CE.

At Worth Matravers, in Dorset, England, a male individual between 17 and 25 years of age, buried in a post-Roman gravesite in use for a span of 100 years largely between 605 CE and 650 CE, carried haplogroups E1b1b1a1-M78 and U5b1. The genome-wide ancestry of the individual indicates that they may descend from grandparents who were a West African man and European woman; the West African ancestor of the individual may have arrived in England via the West African gold trade route from West Africa, through Carthage, during the imperial Byzantine period of North Africa. More specifically, the individual may descend from a southern Sahelian West African who likely departed from West Africa between the mid-6th century CE and the early 7th century CE.

==== France ====
===== Ancient DNA =====
At Pont-sur-Seine, in France, a male individual, dated to the Middle Neolithic, carried haplogroups E1b1a1a1a1c2c and U5b1-16189-@16192.

==== Greece ====
===== Medical DNA =====
According to some studies, Greeks share some Human Leukocyte Antigen (HLA) alleles with East Africans (e.g., Amhara, Nuba, Oromo) and West Africans (e.g., Fulani, Mossi, Rimaibe) from Burkina Faso, who are viewed as having a possible earlier origin in Ethiopia. In particular, West Africans (e.g., Fulani, Mossi, Rimaibe) and Ethiopians (e.g., Amhara, Oromo) are viewed as sharing the most HLA-DRB1 alleles with Greeks. Greeks, West Africans, and Ethiopians are viewed as viewed as sharing chromosome 7 markers. During the desertification of the Green Sahara in 5000 BCE, or during the time of ancient Egypt, admixture between Greeks and black Africans are viewed as having occurred. Following the aridification of the Green Sahara, Africans are viewed as possibly having migrated from the southern region of the Sahara to the region of Athens and the islands in the Aegean. If the migration of black Africans into Greece occurred following the drying of the Green Sahara, it is viewed that this may indicate that Pelasgians derive from black Africans. More likely, if the migration of black Africans into Greece occurred during the time of ancient Egypt, then it is viewed that it may have been when black African dynasties in ancient Egypt and that those who followed them were expelled. Alternatively, during the existence of ancient Egypt, it is viewed that groups from Ethiopia may have migrated to Greece and West Africa, thereby, resulting in the possible admixture of modern Greeks and modern West African ethnic groups (e.g., Fulani, Mossi, Rimaibe). Greeks are viewed as sharing some alleles with West Africans (e.g., Fulani, Mossi, and Rimaibe) and East Africans (e.g., Oromo, Amhara, Nubians), the latter of which are viewed as also interrelated. Following the expulsion of what are characterized as black African Egyptian dynasties and groups who followed the dynasties toward Greece, it is viewed that there may have been subsequent admixture between the incoming groups and Greeks. Another migration of West Africans may have occurred thereafter. Additionally, following desertification of the Green Sahara around 5000 BCE, it is viewed that there may have been another migration of black Africans into Greece. A shared autosomal marker, relating to cystic fibrosis (3120 + 1 G), was viewed as having been found between some Africans and Greeks; as a possible historic explanation for the presence of this marker, the Danaids, who are identified as Africans, are viewed as possibly having migrated toward the north, into ancient Egypt, being repelled in ancient Egypt, and subsequently having migrated into Peloponnesus.

==== Italy ====
===== Ancient DNA =====
An African individual, who has been dated between 1st century CE and 3rd century CE as well as carried haplogroup H1, may have forcibly (via enslavement) or voluntarily migrated from the central Sahara or the Nile Valley (e.g., Sudan) to Rome.

==== Portugal ====
===== Ancient DNA =====
In 4000 BP, there may have been a population that traversed from Africa (e.g., West Africa or West-Central Africa), through the Strait of Gibraltar, into the Iberian Peninsula, where admixing between Africans and Iberians (e.g., of northern Portugal, of southern Spain) occurred.

At Valle da Gafaria, in Lagos, Portugal, seven enslaved Africans, five of which had a combination of African and European admixture, and two of which had West African and Bantu ancestry, all of who were estimated to date between the 15th century CE and the 17th century CE; while one of their haplogroups went undetermined, it was determined that the others carried haplogroups H2a2, L1b1, L3i1b, L3'4'6, L2b1, and L3d.

At Cabeço da Amoreira, in Portugal, an enslaved West African man, who may have been from the Senegambian coastal region of Gambia, Mauritania, or Senegal, and carried haplogroups E1b1a and L3b1a, was buried among shell middens between the 16th century CE and the 18th century CE.

===== Mitochondrial DNA =====
In Lisbon, Portugal, 87% of Angolans, who were sampled in 2014, carried various haplogroups of Macro-haplogroup L (e.g., L0a, L0d, L1b, L1c, L2a, L2b, L2c, L3a, L3b, L3d, L3f, L4), whereas, other sampled Angolans carried different haplogroups (e.g., H, T, R0, K, U, J, M).

In Lisbon, Portugal, out of 80 Guinea-Bissauns, who were sampled in 2017, 73 carried Macro-haplogroup L, 5 carried haplogroup U, one carried haplogroup M, and one carried haplogroup V.

In Lisbon, Portugal, 81% of Mozambicans, who were sampled in 2017, carried various haplogroups of Macro-haplogroup L, whereas, 19% of the sampled Mozambicans carried different haplogroups (e.g., H, U, K, J1, M4, R0, T2).

==== Spain ====
===== Ancient DNA =====
In 4000 BP, there may have been a population that traversed from Africa (e.g., West Africa or West-Central Africa), through the Strait of Gibraltar, into the Iberian Peninsula, where admixing between Africans and Iberians (e.g., of northern Portugal, of southern Spain) occurred.

In Granada, Spain, a Muslim (Moor) of the Cordoba Caliphate, who was of haplogroups E1b1a1 and H1+16189, as well as estimated to date between 900 CE and 1000 CE, and a Morisco, who was of haplogroup L2e1, as well as estimated to date between 1500 CE and 1600 CE, were both found to be of West African (i.e., Gambian) and Iberian descent.

Out of nine male individuals and four female individuals, there were two Sub-Saharan African male individuals from the western and central Sahel found at Ibiza, in Spain. One male individual, who had close genetic relatedness to Laal speakers and the Nilo-Saharan-speaking Sara people from southern Chad, carried haplogroups E1b1a1a1a and L3e1c. The other male individual, who had close genetic relatedness to Niger-Congo-speakers from The Gambia and the Bedik people of Senegal, within the broader region of Senegambia, carried haplogroups E1b1b1a1a1c2 and L3b2. Both Sub-Saharan African individuals were radiocarbon dated to after 1115 CE, and may have been associated with enslavement and trafficking among the Almoravids for the military purpose of recruitment and the Trans-Saharan trade routes along North Africa.

=== Asia ===
Between 15,000 BP and 7000 BP, 86% of Sub-Saharan African mitochondrial DNA was introduced into Southwest Asia by East Africans, largely in the region of Arabia, which constitute 50% of Sub-Saharan African mitochondrial DNA in modern Southwest Asia. During the modern period, a greater number of West Africans introduced Sub-Saharan African mitochondrial DNA than East Africans. In the modern period, 68% of Sub-Saharan African mitochondrial DNA was introduced by East Africans and 22% was introduced by West Africans, which constitutes 50% of Sub-Saharan African mitochondrial DNA in modern Southwest Asia.

==== Arabia ====
===== Mitochondrial DNA =====
From as early as 2500 BP, East African females migrated, as well as some who may have later been enslaved and forcibly transported, into Arabia. Consequently, Arabs, who were sampled in 2003, have been shown to carry Sub-Saharan African haplogroups (e.g., L1, L2, L3b, L3d, L3e); specifically, 35% of Yemenese from the Hadramawt region, and between 10% and 15% among other Arabs (e.g., Bedouin, Iraqis, Jordanians, Palestinians, Syrians).

==== Georgia ====
===== Ancient DNA =====
In Abkhazia, Georgia, an African woman, Zana, who carried haplogroup L2b1b, was 34% West African and 66% East African, and lived during the 19th century CE. Between the 16th century CE and the 19th century CE, the ancestors of Zana, who were of West African and East African ancestry, may have arrived in Abkhazia, Georgia as a result of enslavement during the Ottoman Empire. Khwit, who was the son of Zana and carried haplogroups R1b1a1b1 and L2b1b, was of African and European admixture.

===== Medical DNA =====
Local myth about Zana of Abkhazia, Georgia being an Almasty was refuted by genetic evidence from ancient DNA, which confirmed that Zana was neither closely related to chimpanzees nor closely related to archaic humans, but closely related to other modern humans. Margaryan et al. (2021) speculate that Zana may have had congenital generalized hypertrichosis, which may have resulted in the development of the local myth.

==== India ====
===== Y-Chromosomal DNA =====
Out of the total amount of haplogroups carried, Siddis, who were sampled in 2011, 70% of their paternal haplogroups were found to be African; their paternal haplogroups were found to be common among Bantu-speaking peoples.

===== Mitochondrial DNA =====
Out of the total amount of haplogroups carried, Siddis, who were sampled in 2011, 24% of their maternal haplogroups were found to be African.

===== Autosomal DNA =====
In addition to being found to have 30.74% (±10.98%) South Indian and 7.05% (±10.15%) European ancestry, Siddis, who were sampled in 2011, were found to be 62.21% (±9.68%) East African. Siddis, who were sampled twice in 2011, were found to be 60%-75% Sub-Saharan African.

==== Israel ====
===== Medical DNA =====
During the Copper Age and early Islamic era of ancient Israel, West Africans may have migrated into ancient Israel and introduced head louse from West Africa.

==== Pakistan ====
===== Y-Chromosomal DNA =====
Out of the total amount of haplogroups carried, Makranis, who were sampled in 2002 and 2004, 12% (±7%) of their paternal haplogroups were African.

===== Mitochondrial DNA =====
Out of the total amount of haplogroups carried, Makranis, who were sampled in 2002 and 2004, 40% (±9%) of their maternal haplogroups were African.

===== Autosomal DNA =====
While the orature among Makranis narrates an origin from Abyssinia, the genetic results from 2017 show that much of the ancestry of Makranis derives from Bantu-speaking peoples (Zanj), specifically from the southeast African Swahili coast. In addition to being found to have 74.5% Pakistani ancestry, Makranis, who were sampled in 2017, were found to be 25.5% Sub-Saharan African. Due to the African ancestry in Makranis being genetically similar to southeastern Bantu (e.g., Sotho) and eastern Bantu (e.g., Luhya) peoples, their African ancestry may derive from a source population in Mozambique. Additionally, the African ancestors of the Makranis may have been enslaved by slavers from the Omani Empire during the Indian Ocean slave trade of the 18th century CE.

===== Medical DNA =====
Since enslaved Africans were brought to Pakistan, the African Duffy-null alleles in Makranis have evolved. Makranis have an increased level of malarial resistance to P. vivax.
