= Updown early medieval cemetery =

Cemetery in Eastry, Kent, England

- Eastry III
- Location within Kent
- 51°14′13″N 01°18′32″E
- Type: Inhumation cemetery
- Location: Eastry, Kent
- OS grid reference: TR3107453792

Site notes
- Excavation dates: 1976, 1989
- Archaeologists: Sonia Chadwick Hawkes (1976); Brian Philp (1989)
- Discovered: 1973

Designations
- Designation: Scheduled monument

Updown early medieval cemetery in Eastry, Kent, United Kingdom, was used as a burial place in the 7th century. Eastry was an important administrative centre in the Kingdom of Kent. Updown was one of four cemeteries in and around Eastry. The cemetery measures roughly 150 by 80 m (490 by 260 ft) and may have encompassed around 300 graves.

The site was rediscovered in 1973 in the grounds of Updown House, from which the cemetery took its name. Part of it was protected as a scheduled monument two years later. Excavations followed in 1976 by Sonia Chadwick Hawkes and 1989 by Brian Philp, both times ahead of development plans in the area: first a pipeline and then a bypass. A total of 78 graves were investigated.

Ancient DNA from five of the burials was tested in the 2020s. This led to the discovery that one of the individuals in the cemetery, dubbed Updown Girl, had mixed European and West African ancestry.

== Background ==
The Kingdom of Kent

Eastry was part of the Kingdom of Kent, and the archaeologist Martin Welch described it as "an important regional centre". The kingdom was established in the 5th century. Eastry developed as a royal vill and likely had a royal hall by the 6th century; the archaeologist Sonia Chadwick Hawkes suggested that the presence of a cemetery indicates that Eastry was an important royal residence, possibly with an associated township. The Updown cemetery is one of four early medieval burial (mostly 6th or 7th century) sites in and around Eastry:

- Eastry I – Buttsole cemetery to the east of Eastry, with activity focused on the 6th century; discovered in 1792
- Eastry II – a single burial at Eastry House; discovered in 1970
- Eastry III – the Updown cemetery with 78 graves excavated; discovered in 1973
- Eastry IV – four burials at Eastry Mill; discovered in 1969

Eastry III was discovered in the grounds of Updown House in Eastry and was named after the house. The Updown cemetery is located in Sangrado's Wood, a kite-shaped field south of Eastry. The area was covered by woodland in the late 19th century.

85% of the early medieval cemeteries (5th–11th centuries) in Kent were built within 1.2 km (0.75 mi) of a Roman road. This includes the Updown cemetery which was established close to a road connecting the Roman forts at Richborough and Dover. The cemetery may have been established as a replacement for Buttsole cemetery, possibly as part of the process of converting to Christianity and to be separate from pagan burials.

The Updown cemetery was used in the 7th century, and based on the dating of grave goods found with the bodies, activity at the site can be split into two broad phases. The first phase dates to the first half of the 7th century; this covered approximately thirteen burials, mostly on the south side of the cemetery. Around 28 burials belong to phase 2, spanning the middle and later part of the 7th century and distributed over a broader area than those from the earlier phase.

== Cemetery features ==
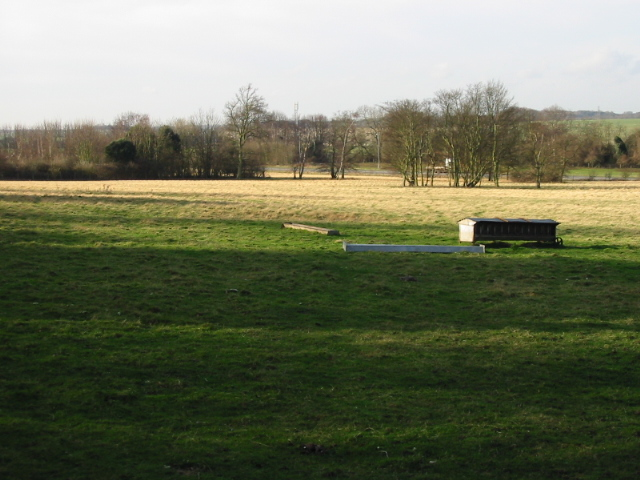
The field known as Sangrado's Wood, south of the excavated area of Updown early medieval cemetery

The cemetery occupies an area roughly 150 by 80 m (490 by 260 ft) and has an estimated 300 burials. Across two excavation campaigns in 1976 and 1989, 78 graves were investigated. Evidence of wooden coffin-like features were found in 27 graves. Nineteen penannular ditches (circular ditches with a segment missing so the circle does not close) were discovered through excavation, each one surrounding at least one burial. The material from the ditches when they were dug was likely used to create an earthwork feature in the enclosed area, possibly a low mound. Burials marked in this way may have been more important than those without a ditch and earthwork.

The graves are exclusively inhumations (burials) and aligned east–west, consistent with Christian burial practices. In Welch's opinion, the burials that have been excavated "[represent] a community that is comfortably off, though not outstandingly wealthy". With around a quarter of the site excavated, the date range during which the site was used is uncertain, and could extend into the 6th or 8th centuries. No buildings or associated settlement have been found in association with the cemetery.

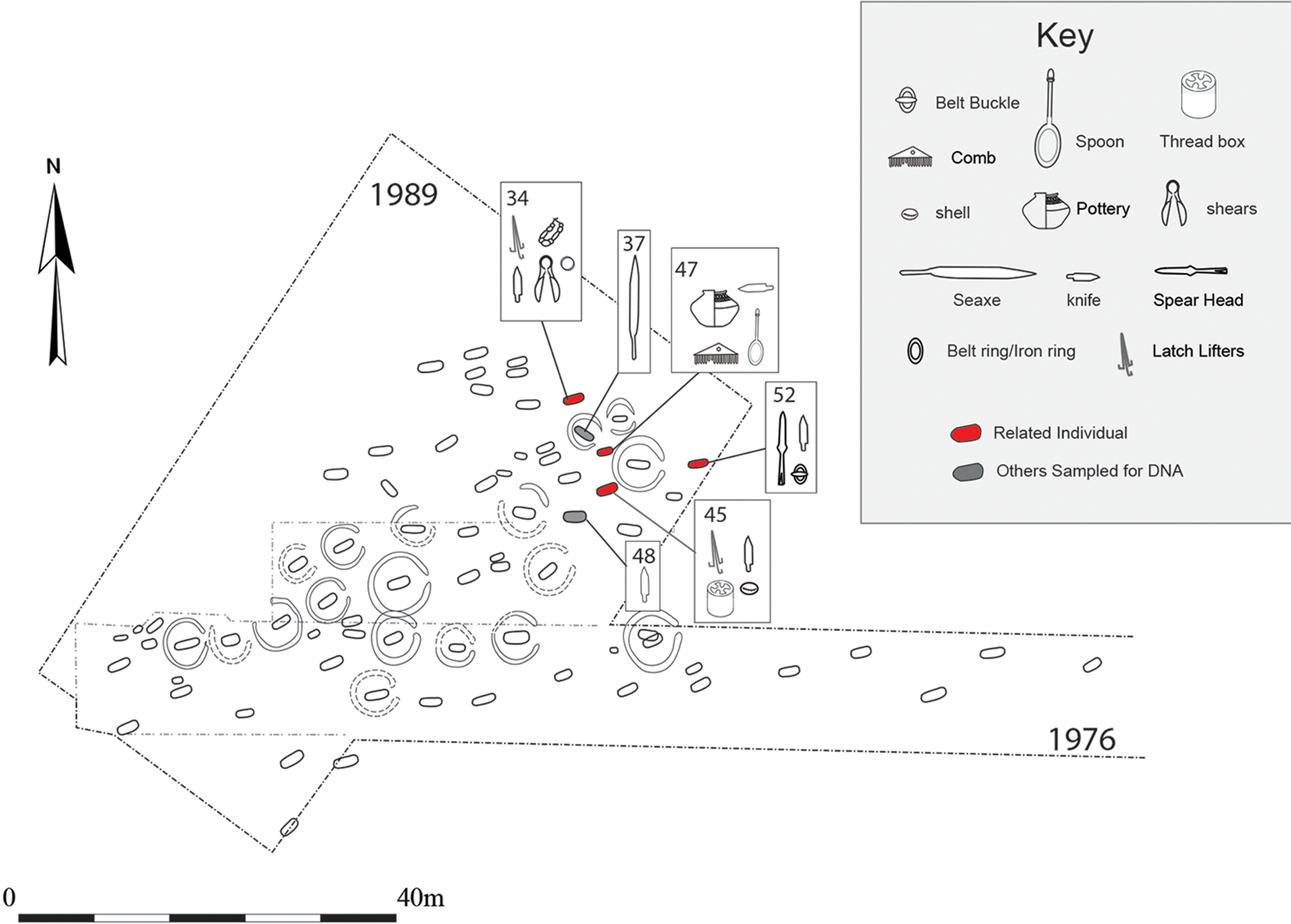
A plan of the excavated portion of the cemetery, with the Updown Girl burial indicated at number 45

== Discovery and excavation ==
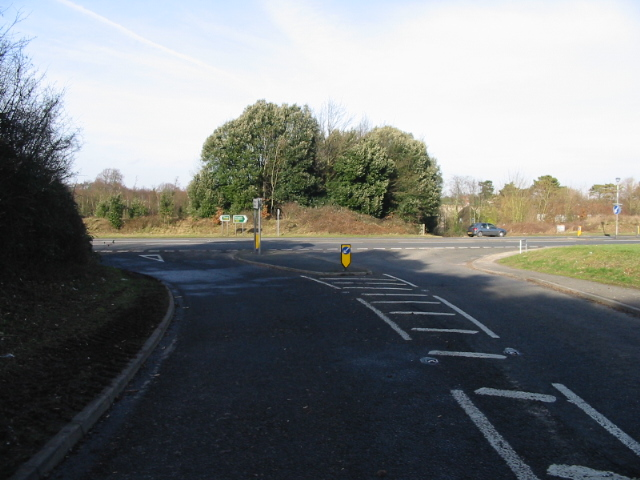
The part of the cemetery lying in the path of the planned Eastry Bypass was excavated in 1989.

The site was discovered in 1973 through the use of aerial photography. Kenneth St Joseph suggested that the cluster of rectangular features around 1.5 m (4 ft 11 in) long and roughly aligned east to west was likely to be a cemetery. The site was designated a scheduled monument in 1975.

Three years after the cemetery was discovered, part of the site was at risk due to plans to lay a pipeline through the area. The landowners, Arthur James and Mary James, commissioned a rescue excavation to record archaeology which may be affected; the dig was led by Sonia Chadwick Hawkes and funded by the Southern Water Board, the Kent Archaeological Society, and the landowners. Mary James had participated in excavations at other early medieval cemeteries at Worthy Park in Hampshire and Finglesham, both directed by Hawkes. The work involved excavating 36 graves and established the cemetery extended further than identified through aerial photographs. The burials were dated to the 7th century. Mary James died in 1976 which may have removed the prospect of future excavations by Hawkes. Instead, Hawkes focused on the post-excavation work and began publishing the results.

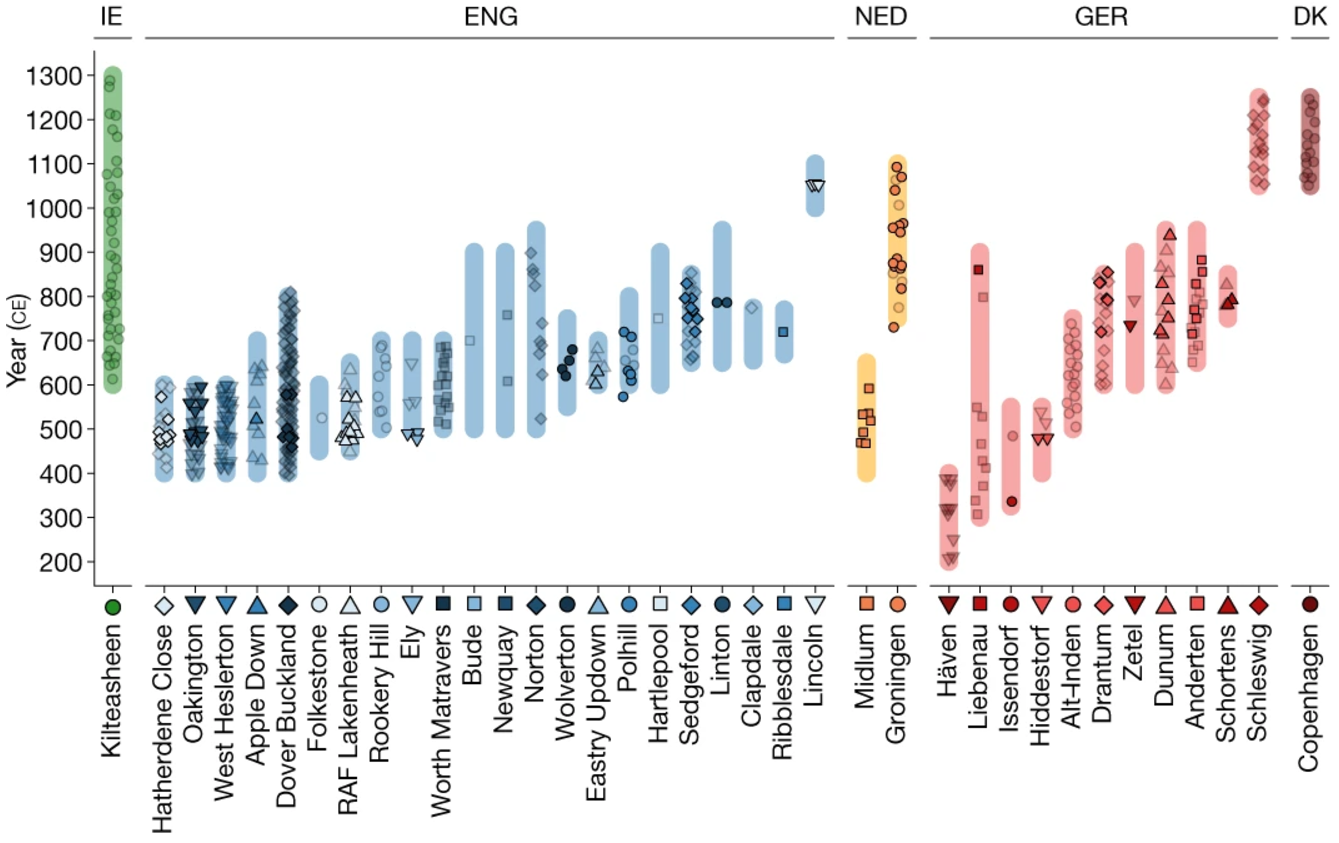
Usage dates of a selection of early medieval cemeteries, including Updown

In 1989, proposals for a new bypass passing through Eastry led to further rescue excavations. Led by Brian Philp, the Kent Archaeological Rescue Unit dug in September and October. They excavated along the route of the proposed bypass, partly intersecting with the area excavated by Hawkes in 1976, uncovering 41 new graves.

While no buildings or settlement have been discovered associated with the cemetery, Hawkes hypothesised that Eastry Court (an 18th-century house build on the local on an earlier house dating from the Middle Ages) may be on the site of a settlement contemporary with the Updown cemetery. Excavations by Christopher Arnold in 1980 and Time Team in 2005 in Eastry did not find evidence of a settlement.

=== Updown Girl ===
Grave 47 from the 1989 excavation contained the remains of a girl aged around 10 or 11 years. The individual has become known as 'Updown Girl' in scholarship and media reports after the term was used in a special issue of Current Archaeology published in 2022. A project profiling the genomes from 460 individuals from medieval north-west Europe sampled 5 individuals from the Updown cemetery, including Updown Girl. The analysis found that the people buried in eastern England had about three-quarters of their ancestry "from the continental North Sea zone", and in early medieval England there was "complex, regionally contingent migration with partial integration that was probably dependent on the fortunes of specific families and their individual members".

The analysis of Updown Girl's DNA indicated that she had mixed European and West African ancestry. She had a West African male ancestor who lived in the 6th century. The investigating team suggested that "the movement of the Updown Girl's ancestors was presumably linked to ... Late Antique trading routes". The research also showed that Updown Girl was buried close to relatives, possibly great aunts, who had a largely Continental Northern European ancestry (Dutch, Danish, and northern German). The similarity of burial between Updown Girl and her nearby female relatives suggests that the burial practice – the use of grave goods, orientation, and proximity to relatives – was meant to show "a shared regional identity".

== See also ==
- Polhill Anglo-Saxon cemetery – an early medieval cemetery in Kent
