= Evx1 =

Protein-coding gene in mammals

Evx1 is a mammalian gene located downstream of the HoxA cluster, which encodes for a homeobox transcription factor. Evx1 is a homolog of even-skipped (eve), which is a pair-rule gene that regulates body segmentation in Drosophila. The expression of Evx1 is developmentally regulated, displaying a biphasic expression pattern with peak expression in the primitive streak during gastrulation and in interneurons during neural development. Evx1 has been shown to regulate anterior-posterior patterning during gastrulation by acting as a downstream effector of the Wnt and BMP signalling pathways. It is also a critical regulator of interneuron identity.

Despite a regulatory role in both of these processes, the Evx1 KO mouse is viable and displays no overt phenotype after birth.

A divergent long non-coding RNA (Evx1as) is also expressed from the locus, which is temporally and spatially co-expressed with Evx1. Evx1as does not have a function beyond that of Evx1 (in trans); however, it has been shown to regulate Evx1 at the locus (in cis).
