= Pre-colonial trade routes in Africa =

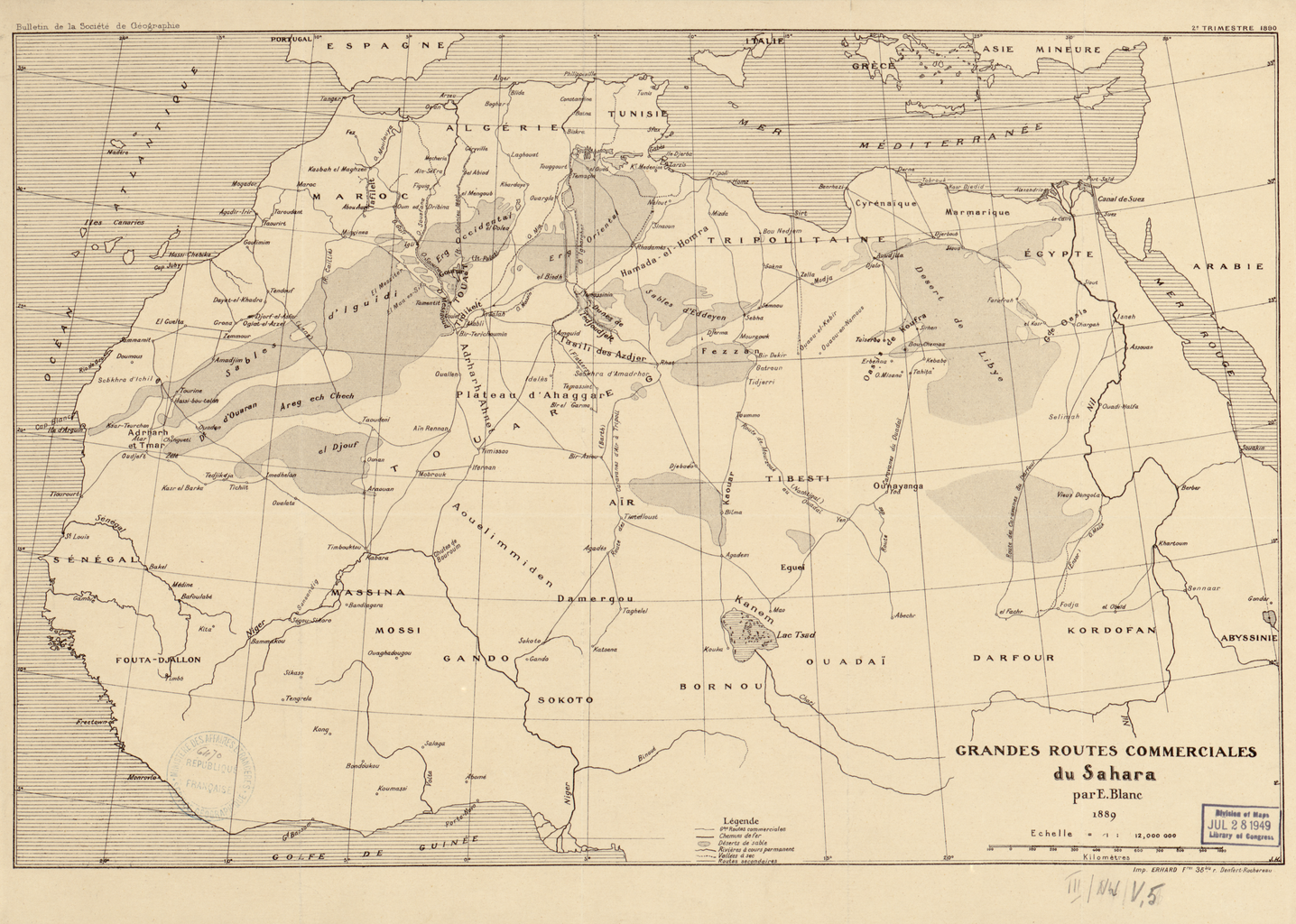
1889 map of trans-Saharan trading routes by French explorer Édouard Blanc

The extensive pre-colonial trade routes and networks in Africa connected various regions of the continent, facilitated the exchange of goods and ideas, contributed to the development of African civilizations, and fostered economic prosperity and cultural exchange long before European colonization.

== Geographical scope and timeline ==
In West Africa, the trans-Saharan trade routes connected the rich gold-producing regions around the Niger River with North Africa and the Mediterranean. This connection allowed West African empires like Ghana, Mali, and Songhai to flourish as they traded gold, salt, ivory, and slaves for goods from the Mediterranean world, such as textiles and horses. Notable trading hubs such as Timbuktu, Gao, and Djenne became renowned centres of wealth, learning, and culture. Alongside these major trading hubs, regional trading hubs in the Sahara, such as Sijilmasa, also became important economic centers within the larger Islamic empires of North Africa.

In East Africa, the Indian Ocean trade network linked the African coast with the Middle East, India, and Southeast Asia. Coastal cities like Kilwa, Mombasa, and Zanzibar emerged as major points of exchange that thrived on the trade of gold, ivory, and slaves, facilitated the flow of goods, and blended African, Arab, Persian, and Indian influences into a distinct Swahili culture.

Caravans of camels, often termed the "ships of the desert," traversed the vast expanse of the Sahara Desert, carrying valuable commodities like salt from the Sahara to the gold-producing regions of West Africa.

In Southern Africa, internal trade networks linked the continent's interior to its coastal areas. For instance, the trade routes of the Mali Empire connected the gold fields of West Africa to the Mediterranean via the Niger River. These routes facilitated the exchange of gold, kola nuts, and other commodities.

The timeline of these trade networks extends from around 500 A.D., with significant activity continuing until the late 19th century. The networks evolved over these centuries, shaped by the rise and fall of empires, technological advancements, and shifting economic demands. The introduction of Islam in the 7th century profoundly influenced trade in North and West Africa.

=== Major trade routes ===
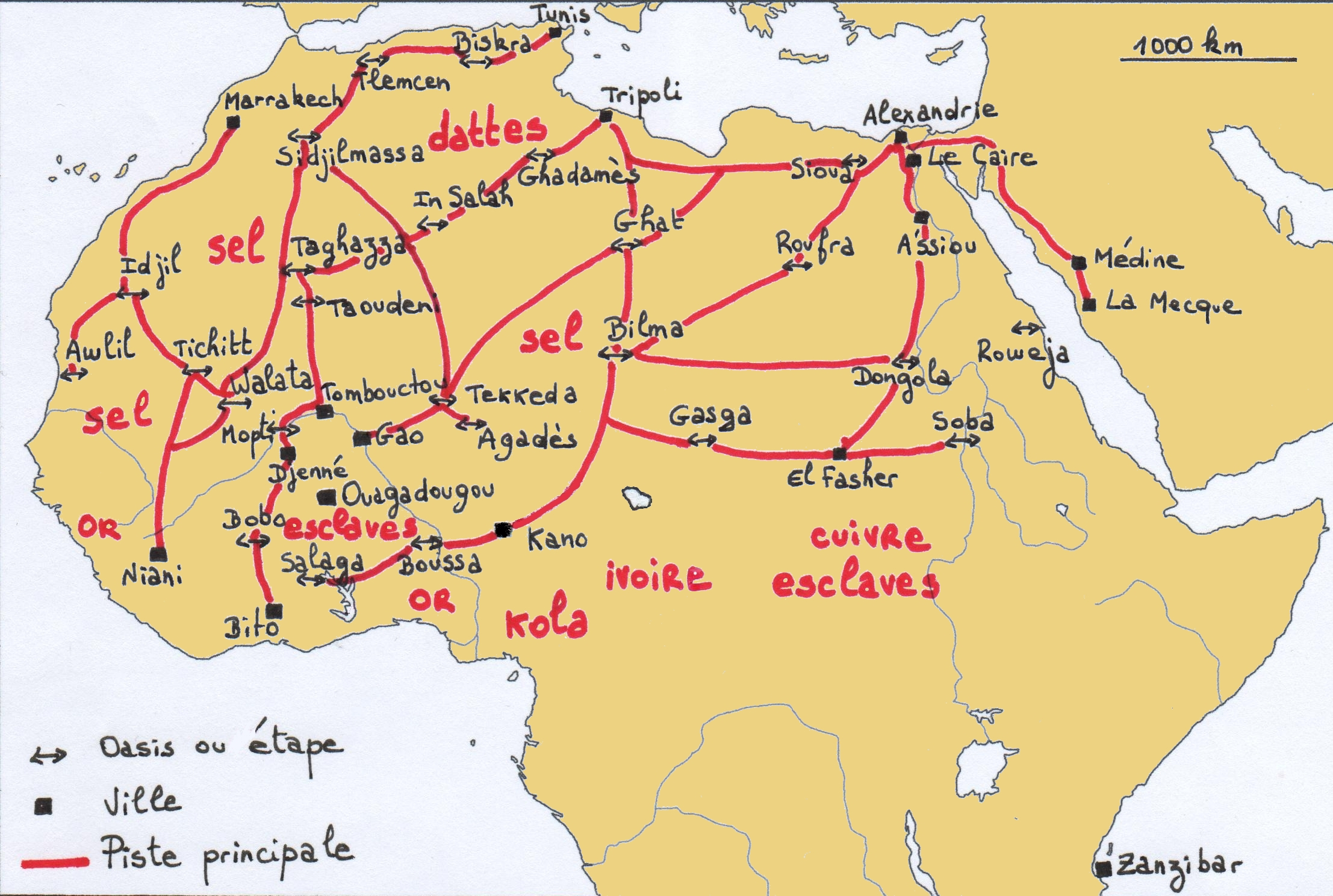
Trans-Saharan trade routes, from Marrakesh to the Awlil salt mines on the west, to Darb Al Arbain on the east

The trans-Saharan trade routes connected West Africa with North Africa and the Mediterranean, facilitating the exchange of gold, salt, ivory, and slaves. The gold from the regions around the Niger River was particularly prized in the Mediterranean and beyond. Timbuktu, Gao, and Djenne flourished as hubs of commerce, culture, and learning that attracted scholars and traders from various parts of the world.

The Indian Ocean trade network linked the East African coast with the Middle East, India, and Southeast Asia. Coastal cities such as Kilwa, Mombasa, and Zanzibar exported goods like gold, ivory, and slaves, and imported textiles, spices, and ceramics.

Intra-continental trade routes within Africa also connected the continent's interior regions to its coastal areas. For instance, the trade networks of the Mali Empire linked the gold fields of West Africa to the Mediterranean via the Niger River. These routes facilitated the exchange of gold, kola nuts, and other commodities, and promoted economic interdependence among different African regions. This internal trade contributed to the development of regional economies and the rise of powerful African empires.

=== Notable empires and states ===
==== West African empires ====
The Ghana, Mali, and Songhai Empires were among the most powerful states in pre-colonial West Africa, controlling and benefiting immensely from trans-Saharan trade. The Mali Empire, under the rule of Mansa Musa, is particularly noted for its extraordinary wealth. Mansa Musa's pilgrimage to Mecca in 1324 showcased the immense resources of his empire and left a lasting impression on the Islamic world. The gold from Mali and the scholarly achievements of Timbuktu were central to the empire's influence and prosperity.

==== East African city-states ====
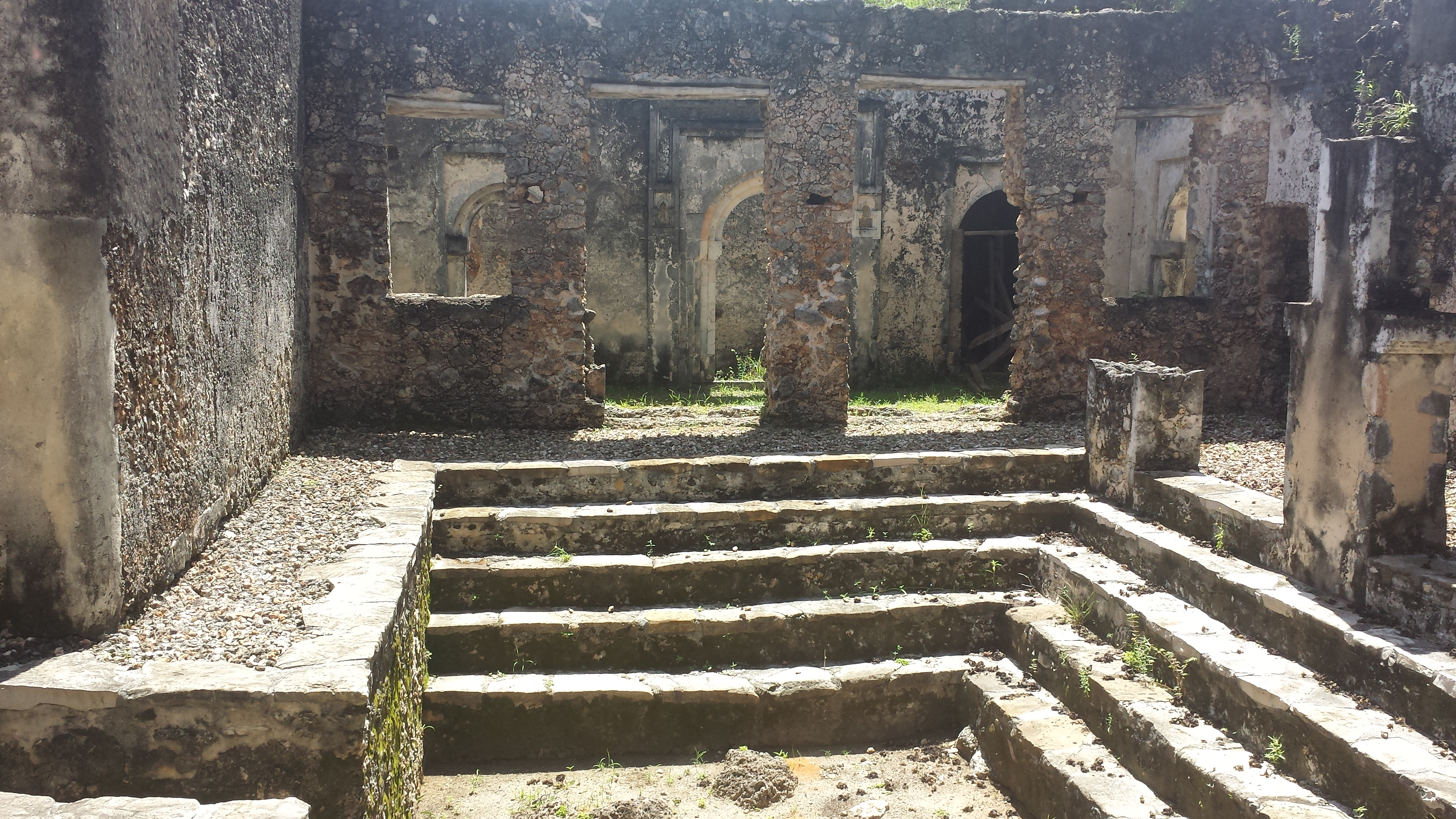
Ruins of Songo Mnara

City-states along the Swahili coast, such as Zanzibar, Kilwa, and Mombasa, thrived on the Indian Ocean trade in gold, ivory, and slaves, in exchange for textiles, spices, and ceramics.

==== Central and southern African states ====
The Kingdom of Zimbabwe, with its capital at Great Zimbabwe, was central to trade networks in Southern Africa.

== Commodities traded ==
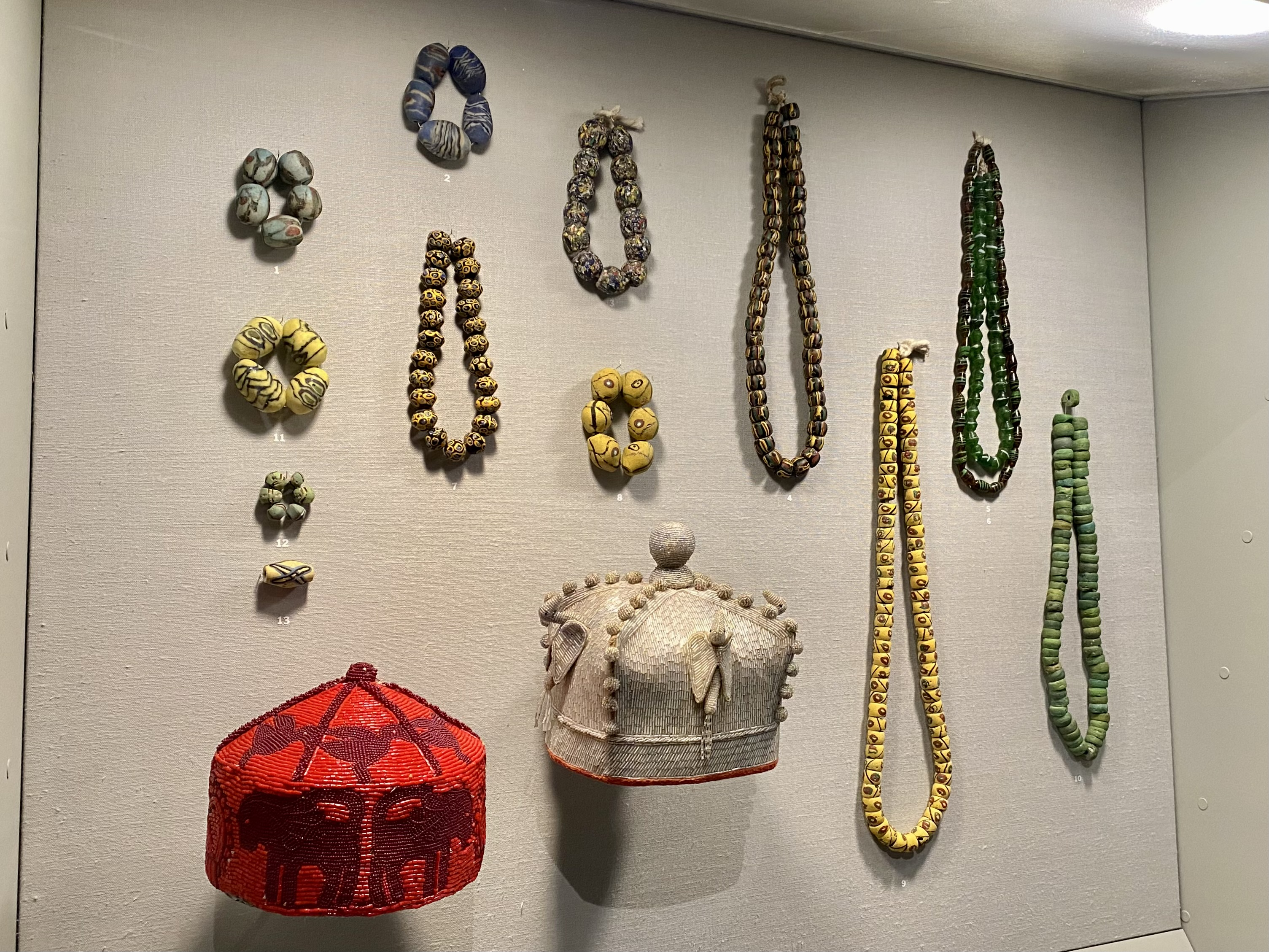
African commodities were traded for glass beads made in Venice, used for jewelry and decoration of textiles

The trade networks facilitated the exchange of various goods and resources, each with significant economic implications. Gold was perhaps the most important commodity traded, particularly from West Africa. It was highly prized in the Mediterranean and beyond, driving much of the economic activity along the trans-Saharan routes. The wealth generated from gold trade supported the rise of powerful West African empires and sophisticated urban centres. A major example of this is the Almoravid Empire, which used trade with gold producing-Sudan to finance a takeover of much of Northern Africa and Iberia.

Salt, sourced from the Sahara, was especially valued for its role in preserving food. The trade in salt was vital for the sustenance of large populations and the functioning of complex societies, as it served not only as a commodity in and of itself, but also potentially as a unit of exchange. Ivory, exported from various regions of Africa, was sought after for its beauty and utility in crafting luxury goods.

Enslaved Africans were traded both within the continent and to other parts of the world, including the Middle East, India, and Southeast Asia.

Textiles, spices, and ceramics, which were valuable for their utility, were among the imported goods that flowed into Africa through the Indian Ocean trade.

== Cultural and social impact ==
=== Cultural exchange ===
Trade routes were instrumental in the dissemination of ideas and religious beliefs, with Islam being one of the most notable influences. As Muslim traders travelled across the Sahara and along the Indian Ocean coast, they introduced Islam to many African societies. This led to the establishment of Islamic centres of learning, such as those in Timbuktu, which became renowned for their contributions to education and scholarship. These centres housed extensive libraries and attracted scholars from across the Islamic world.

Along the Swahili Coast, for instance, African, Arab, Persian, and Indian cultures intersected. This blend was evident in the architecture, language, cuisine, and social customs of the region. The Swahili language incorporates elements from Arabic, Persian, Portuguese, and various African languages.

=== Urban development ===
The wealth generated from trade led to the growth and flourishing of major urban centres. Timbuktu and Kilwa Sultanate on the East African coast became renowned for their economic prosperity, architectural achievements, and status as centres of learning and culture. These cities attracted scholars, artisans, and traders from various parts of the world.

== Decline and transformation ==
=== Impact of colonization ===
The arrival of European colonizers in the 15th century marked the beginning of a great transformation and disruption of Africa's traditional trade networks. European powers sought to control African resources and trade routes, leading to the decline of indigenous trade systems and the imposition of new economic structures designed to serve colonial interests. The exploitation of African resources and people during the colonial period had a devastating economic and social impact on the continent. Traditional trade routes were often neglected or repurposed to facilitate the extraction of resources for European benefit, disrupting local economies and societies.

=== Modern legacy ===
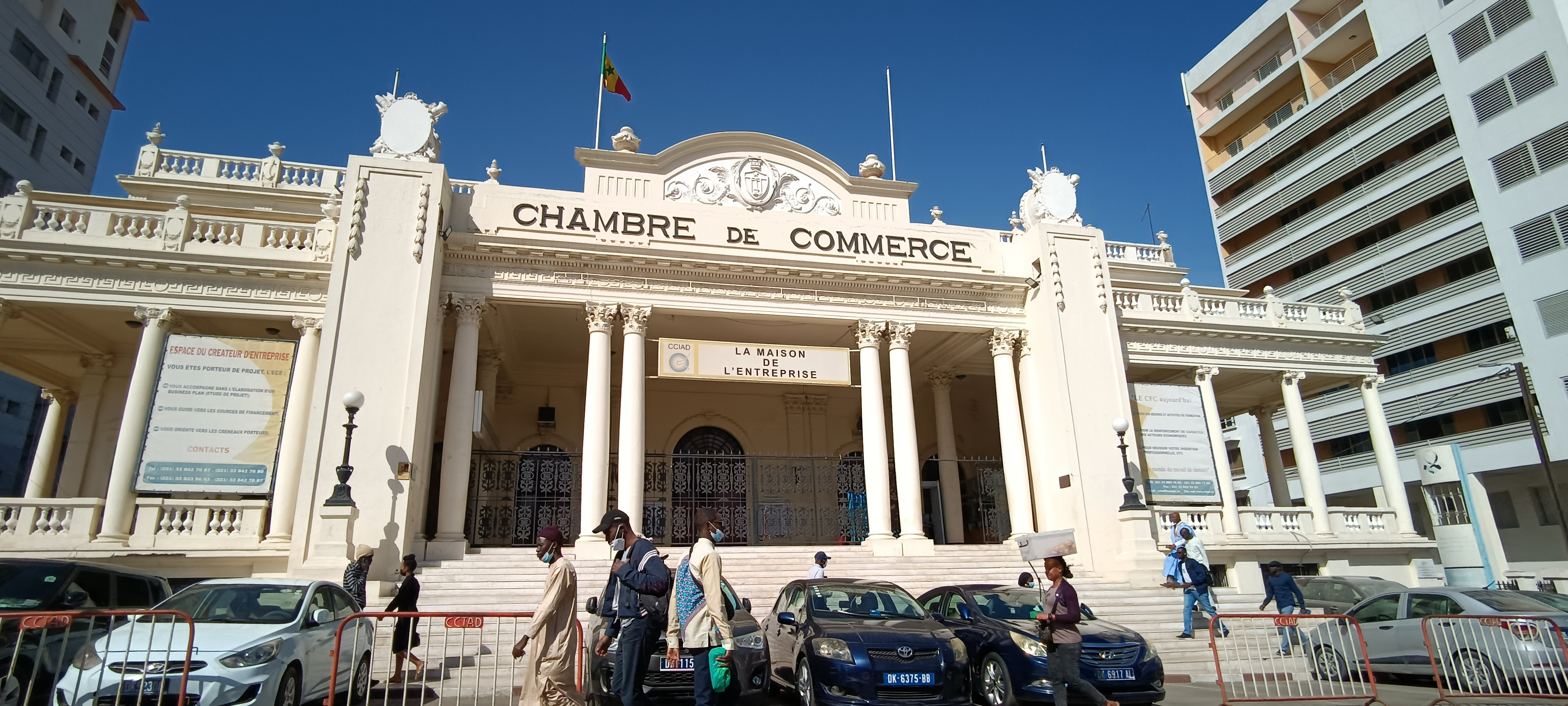
Chamber of Commerce building in Dakar

The remnants of these trade routes persist in the cultural and architectural heritage of African cities. These historical trade networks influenced contemporary trade patterns within and beyond Africa.
