= Updown Girl =

7th-century Anglo-Saxon girl from Kent, England

- Common name: Updown Girl
- Species: Homo sapiens
- Age: 7th century AD
- Place discovered: Updown early medieval cemetery, Eastry, Kent
- Date discovered: 1989

Updown Girl is the name given to the skeletal remains of a 10- or 11-year-old Anglo-Saxon girl discovered at an early 7th-century burial site close to Updown House in Eastry, Kent, England. Although first found in 1989, the Updown Girl aroused new interest in 2022 when modern analysis of her DNA indicated she had some West African ancestry, with evidence suggesting her paternal grandfather or possibly her great-grandfather came from either the Esan or Yoruba population groups.

== Background ==
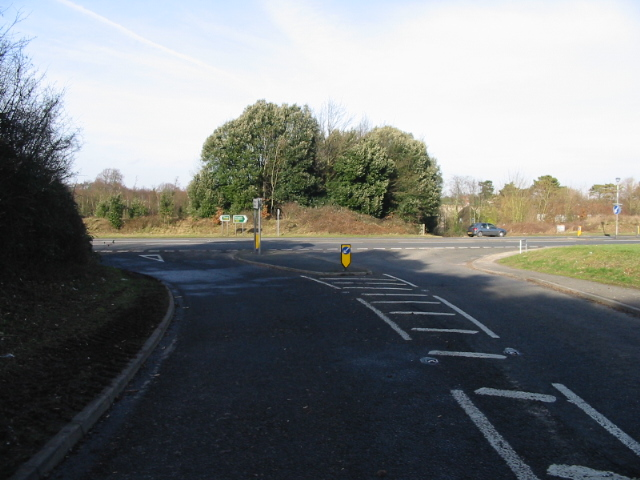
The part of the cemetery lying in the path of the planned Eastry Bypass was excavated in 1989.

Updown early medieval cemetery was discovered in 1973 through the use of aerial photography and first excavated in 1976. The cemetery covers an area roughly 150 by 80 m (490 by 260 ft) and contains an estimated 300 burials; around a quarter of the site has been excavated. Thirty-six graves were excavated in 1976 and another 41 were excavated in 1989 (excluding some graves from the 1976 campaign which were re-opened). Twenty-one of the excavated burials contained children.

== Discovery ==
Updown Girl was discovered during excavations in 1989 at Updown early medieval cemetery, occupying grave 47. The grave was oriented roughly east to west and measured 1.92 m (6 ft 4 in) long, 0.52 m (1 ft 8 in) wide and 0.34 m (1 ft 1 in) deep. Grave 47 was located near the north end of the excavated area close to a number of other burials; graves 37, 38, 41, 42, 45, 50, and 51 were all within 5 m (16 ft) of Updown Girl. Graves 34 and 45 contained relatives, possibly Updown Girl's great aunts. Grave 52 contained a male relative of Updown Girl – DNA analysis indicates he was her great-grandfather.

Updown Girl is estimated to have died in the early 7th century and, based on osteoarchaeological evidence, was aged around the age of ten or eleven. Grave goods accompanying her burial were typical of the local culture of the period.

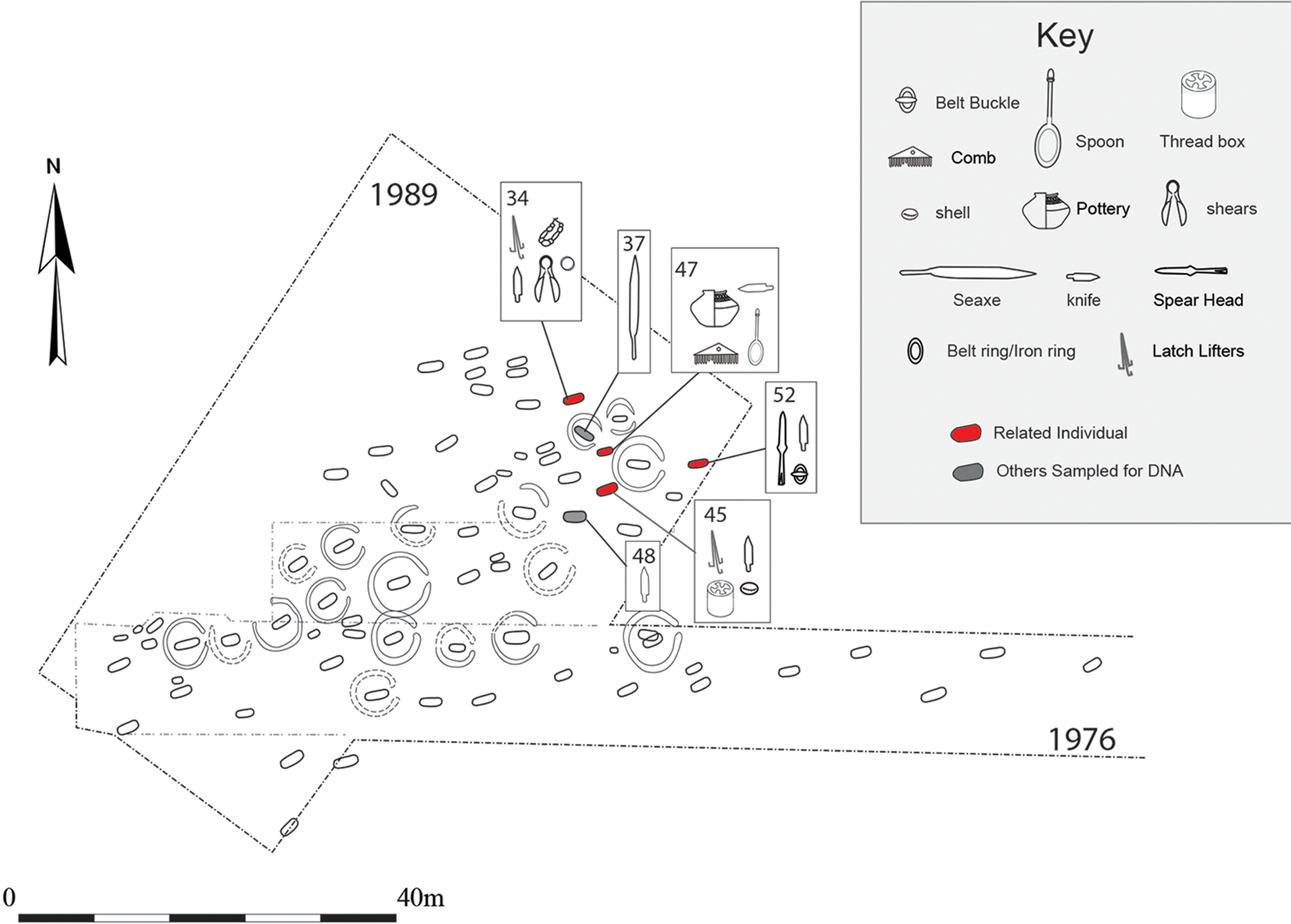
The position of Updown Girls' burial (number 45) in the cemetery

== Grave goods ==
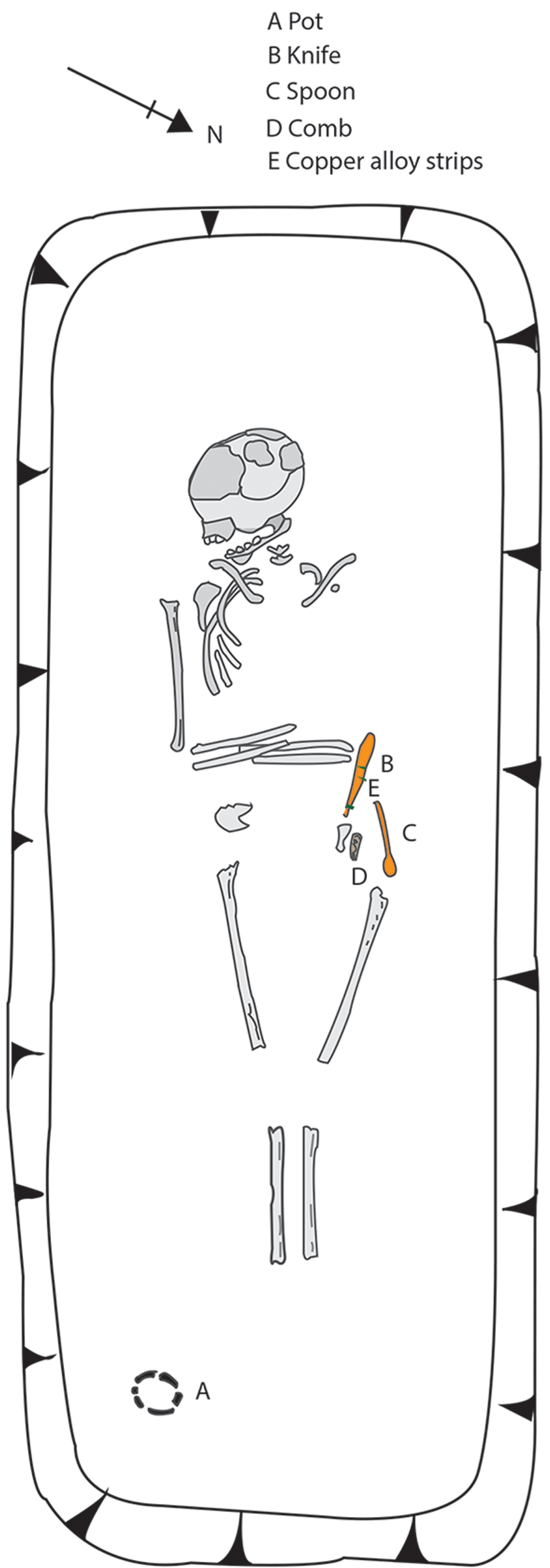
Plan of the grave with the position of the grave goods

Grave goods were ubiquitous in early medieval England and are found in graves as early as the 5th century, though they became less common in the 8th century. The possible meanings of grave goods vary greatly, depending on culture and context: they include expressions of identity and status, items for use in the afterlife, and gifts to the deceased.

Updown Girl was buried with a pot, a bone comb, a knife, a spoon, and a strap. The assemblage, like much of the cemetery, can be broadly dated to the 7th century. The knife was too damaged to match to an existing typology. Frankish wheel-thrown pottery was found in five graves at the cemetery, including that of Updown Girl, evidence of Kent's connections to mainland Europe. They may have been buried in a bag, of which only copper alloys mounts remained when excavated.

Just two bone combs (or possibly made from antler) and iron spoons were found in the cemetery, one comb and spoon in each of grave 47 (Updown Girl) and grave 45, the burial of an individual aged 16–24 who was possibly Updown Girl's great aunt.

== DNA analysis ==
Analysis of Updown Girl's remains were carried out as part of a research project which used modern DNA and isotope analysis to shed light on migrations into Britain in the post-Roman period. The results indicated that she had some West African ancestry, with evidence suggesting her paternal grandfather or possibly her great-grandfather came from either the Esan or Yoruba population groups. The study was undertaken jointly by the University of Central Lancashire and the Max Planck Institute for Evolutionary Anthropology of Leipzig, and for their investigation researchers re-examined 460 skeletons from 37 archaeological sites across Britain and Europe, using recent DNA and isotope techniques to plot shifts in population. DNA analysis showed a high proportion of those living in the South Eastern parts of England in the 7th century – up to 76% – had genetic links with Continental Northern Europe, particularly with regions corresponding to modern Germany and Denmark.

Analysis of the skeletons of two women buried near the girl indicates they were related to her, being probably either her aunts or great-aunts. Both were of predominantly Continental North European ancestry with some Franco-Belgian admixture. There appears to have been no distinction made between them and the Updown Girl, either in the location of the burials or in the type of grave goods accompanying the remains. Carly Hilts, editor of Current Archaeology, observed that: "She was accompanied by very typical grave goods ... and there was nothing to suggest that she had been treated differently, at least in death, even though the new genetic research highlights that her ancestry was very different to that of many of the people buried around her."

== See also ==
- History of Kent
