= Lee Duncan =

Lee Duncan may refer to:

- Lee Duncan, the owner and trainer of Rin Tin Tin
- Lee Duncan, a pen name of Lawrence Block, an American crime writer

== See also ==
- Leland Lewis Duncan, an English public servant, antiquary and author
