= Vaughan Thomas =

Vaughan Thomas may refer to:

- Vaughan Thomas (rugby league) (born 1945), English rugby league footballer
- Vaughan Thomas (rowing) (1964–2022), British rowing coxswain
- Vaughan Thomas (antiquarian) (1775–1858), English antiquarian
