= John Brent =

John Brent may refer to:

- John Brent (antiquary) (1808–1882), English novelist, poet and antiquary
- John Brent (comedian) (1938–1985), American actor, comedian and beat poet
- Brent (Planet of the Apes), a character from The Planet of the Apes

== See also ==
- Johnny Brent Cueto (born 1986), Dominican baseball player
