= Godfrey Faussett =

English clergyman and academic

- Born: 1781
- Died: 1853 (aged 71–72)
- Education: Corpus Christi College, Oxford; Magdalen College
- Occupations: Clergyman and academic
- Spouse: Marianne-Elizabeth Bridges
- Children: Thomas Godfrey Faussett
- Parent(s): Henry Godfrey Faussett and Susan Sandys

Ecclesiastical career
- Writings: The Claims of the Established Church to exclusive attachment and support, and the Dangers which menace her from Schism and Indifference, considered
- Offices held: Lady Margaret Professor of Divinity at Oxford

Godfrey Faussett (c.1781–1853) was an English clergyman and academic, Lady Margaret Professor of Divinity at Oxford from 1827. He was known as a controversialist. As a churchman he exemplified the high-and-dry tradition.

== Life ==
He was the son of Henry Godfrey Faussett of Kent (son of Bryan Faussett) and Susan Sandys. He graduated B.A. at Corpus Christi College, Oxford in 1801, and M.A. in 1804 as a Fellow of Magdalen College. He became B.D. in 1822 and D.D. in 1827, the year in which he was elected Lady Margaret Professor.

Faussett was Bampton Lecturer, publishing The Claims of the Established Church to exclusive attachment and support, and the Dangers which menace her from Schism and Indifference, considered (1820). He took the conservative side of the religious issues in the university, opposing the 1834 bill of George William Wood to allow dissenters to enter (on a committee with Edward Burton, John Henry Newman, Edward Pusey and William Sewell), and defending subscription to the Thirty Nine Articles in 1835 with Vaughan Thomas and Newman.

Faussett's 1838 sermon The Revival of Popery was provoked by the Tractarian publication of the Remains of Hurrell Froude, who had died in 1836; in it Faussett denounced Newman and John Keble. It echoed an 1831 sermon of Burton preached against Henry Bellenden Bulteel. It also proved a turning point as far as traditional High Church support for the Oxford Movement went within the university, since Faussett's alienation reflected the views of others in the camp. Newman replied in a "Letter to Faussett" in June of that year, significant in its abandonment of his previous views on the Antichrist. In 1843 Faussett complained to the vice-chancellor Philip Wynter about a sermon by Pusey. The outcome was that Pusey was banned from preaching for two years.

== Works ==
In 1830, Faussett attacked Henry Hart Milman's History of the Jews (1829) in a sermon Jewish History Vindicated from the Unscriptural View of it Displayed in the History of the Jews. The Alliance of Church and State Explained and Vindicated (1834) protested against the power of non-Anglicans to legislate for the Church of England.

== Family ==
Faussett married first Marianne-Elizabeth Bridges of Thanet; they had two sons and two daughters. Thomas Godfrey Faussett was his son by his second wife Sarah Wethered of Great Marlow.
