= Christian pilgrimage =

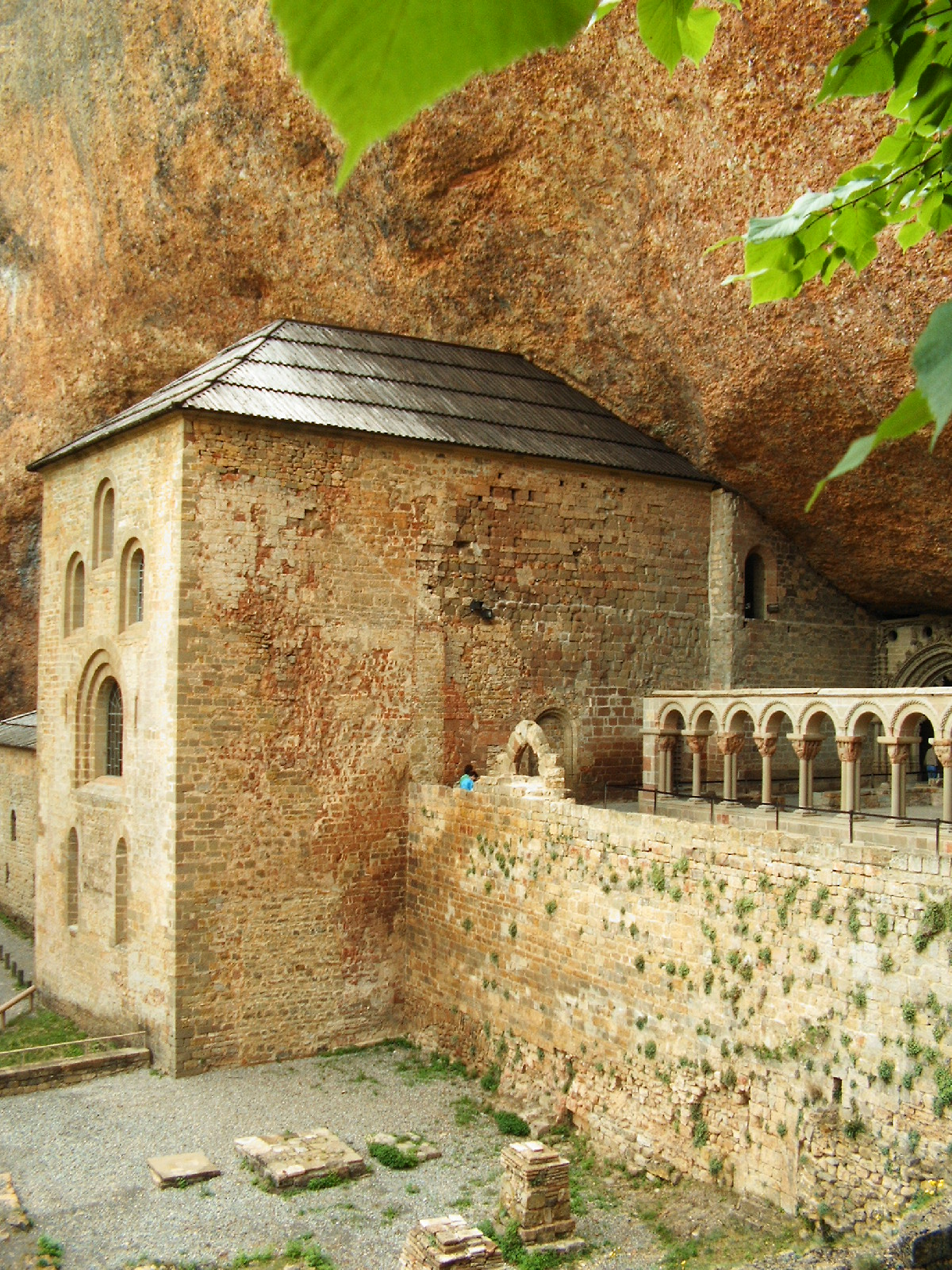
The Way of St. James (el Camino de Santiago), is the pilgrimage to the Cathedral of Santiago de Compostela where legend has it that it holds the remains of the apostle, Saint James the Great. The route was declared the first European Cultural Route by the Council of Europe in October 1987; it was also named one of UNESCO's World Heritage Sites in 1993.

Christianity has a strong tradition of pilgrimages, both to sites relevant to the Old and New Testament narrative (especially in the Holy Land) and to sites associated with later saints, miracles, and Marian apparitions. A pilgrimage journey is usually characterised in terms of discovery and encounter as well as a physical destination.

== History ==
Christian pilgrimages were first made to sites connected with the birth, life, crucifixion and resurrection of Jesus. Aside from the early example of Origen in the third century, surviving descriptions of Christian pilgrimages to the Holy Land date from the 4th century, when pilgrimage was encouraged by church fathers including Saint Jerome, and established by Saint Helena, the mother of Constantine the Great.

In many places, an extensive infrastructure developed that was specifically geared towards the accommodation and consumption needs of a large number of pilgrims. In the late Middle Ages, there were organised group journeys for pilgrims, mainly by ship from various starting points to Israel.

== Purpose and motivations ==
The purpose of Christian pilgrimage was summarized by Pope Benedict XVI this way:

To go on pilgrimage is not simply to visit a place to admire its treasures of nature, art or history. To go on pilgrimage really means to step out of ourselves in order to encounter God where he has revealed himself, where his grace has shone with particular splendour and produced rich fruits of conversion and holiness among those who believe. Above all, Christians go on pilgrimage to the Holy Land, to the places associated with the Lord’s passion, death and resurrection. They go to Rome, the city of the martyrdom of Peter and Paul, and also to Compostela, which, associated with the memory of Saint James, has welcomed pilgrims from throughout the world who desire to strengthen their spirit with the Apostle’s witness of faith and love.

Pilgrimages are made to Rome and other sites associated with the apostles, saints and Christian martyrs, as well as to places where there have been apparitions of the Virgin Mary. A popular pilgrimage journey is along the Way of St. James to the Santiago de Compostela Cathedral, in Galicia, Spain, where the shrine of the apostle James is located. Also a combined pilgrimage is held every seven years in the three nearby towns of Maastricht, Aachen and Kornelimünster where many important relics could be seen (see: Pilgrimage of the Relics, Maastricht).

The motivations which draw today's visitors to Christian sacred sites can be mixed: faith-based, spiritual in a general way, with cultural interests, etc. This diversity has become an important factor in the management and pastoral care of Christian pilgrimage, as recent research on international sanctuaries and much-visited churches has shown. The Methodist local preacher Jill Baker has identified five components of a Christian pilgrimage: intentionality, willingness to leave things behind, liminality, openness and transformation.

== Destinations ==
=== Holy Land ===
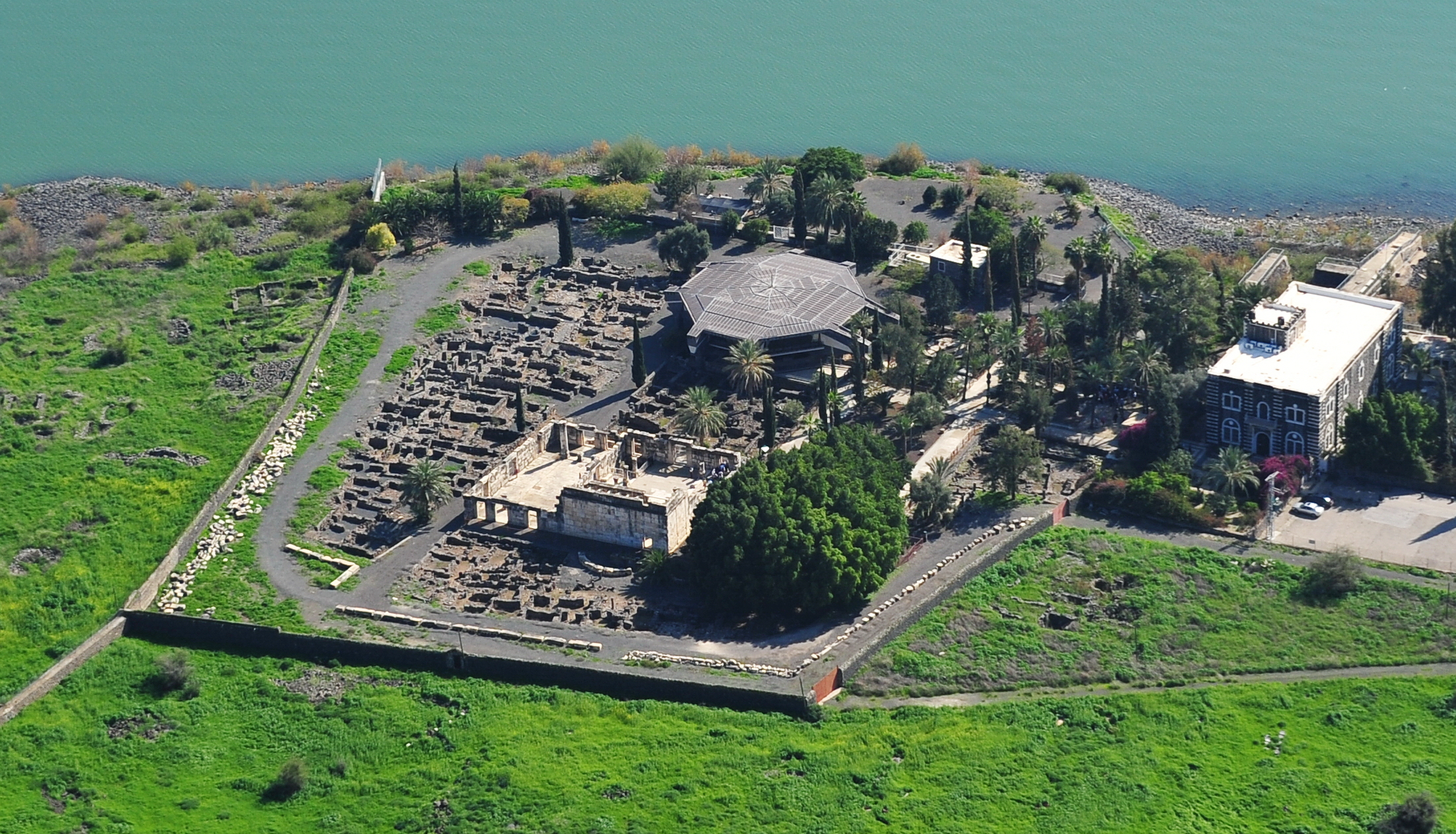
Capernaum, an ancient Judean village associated with Jesus.

The first pilgrimages were made to sites connected with Jesus. Aside from the early example of Origen who, "in search of the traces of Jesus, the disciples and the prophets", already found local folk prompt to show him the actual location of the Gadarene swine in the mid-3rd century, surviving descriptions of Christian pilgrimages to the Holy Land and Jerusalem date from the 4th century. The anonymous Bordeaux Pilgrim's Itinerarium Burdigalense ("Bordeaux Itinerary") is the oldest surviving recount of a Christian pilgrimage to Jerusalem and chronicles his visit in 333 to 334. Egeria, in the early 380s, included several locations with Old Testament significance in her Travels.

The pilgrimage tradition was established by Helena, the mother of Constantine the Great and encouraged by church fathers like Saint Jerome. Pilgrimages also began to be made to Rome and other sites associated with the Apostles, Saints and Christian martyrs, as well as to places where there have been apparitions of the Virgin Mary. Pilgrimage to Rome became a common destination for pilgrims from throughout Western Christianity in the medieval period, and important sites were listed in travel-guides such as the 12th-century Mirabilia Urbis Romae.

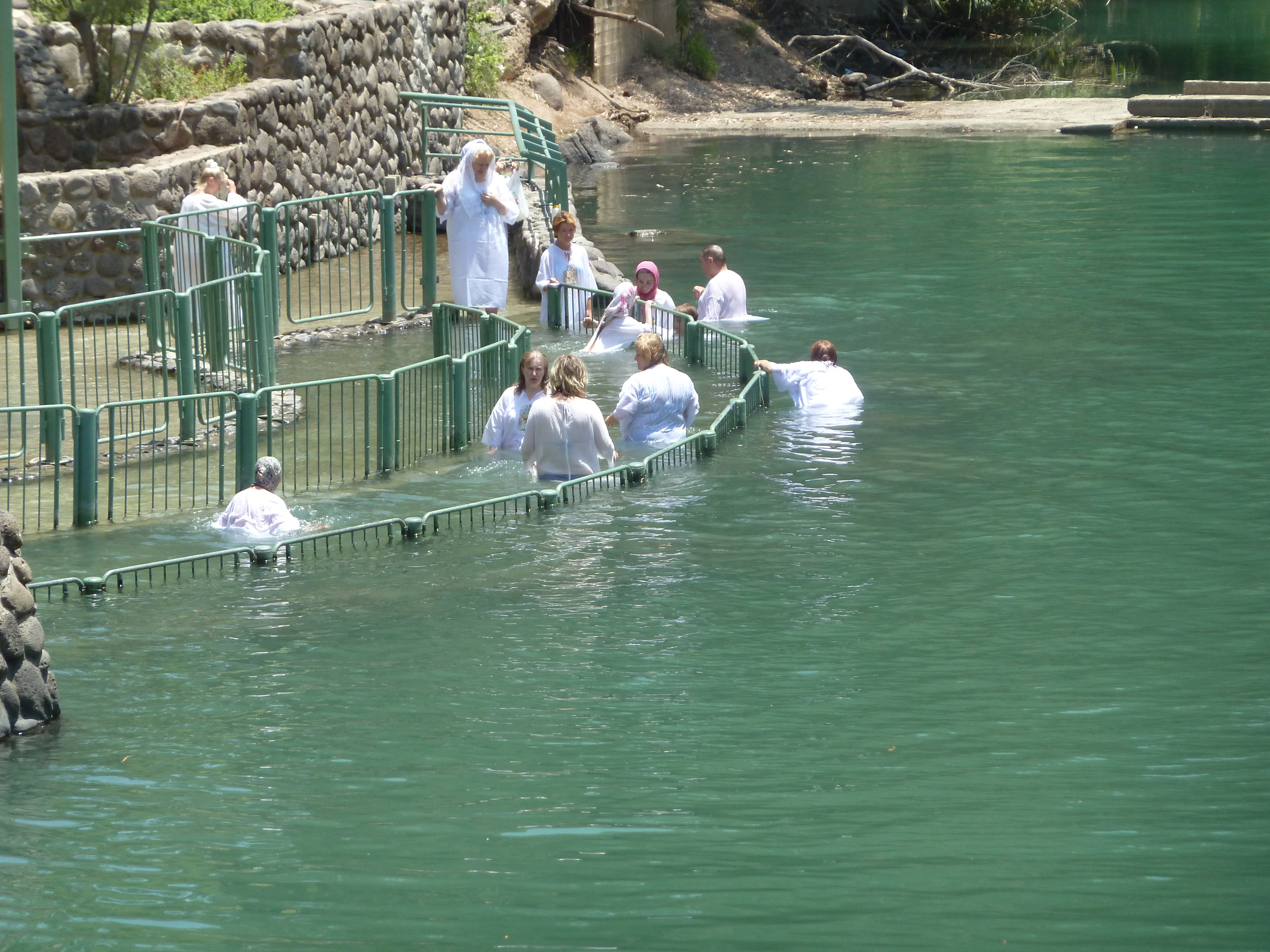
Christians come to the Jordan river to baptise. Picture taken in Yardenit, Israel.

In the 7th century, the Holy Land fell to the Muslim conquests, and as pilgrimage to the Holy Land now became more difficult for European Christians, major pilgrimage sites developed in Western Europe, notably Santiago de Compostela in the 9th century, though travelers such as Bernard the Pilgrim continued to make the journey to the Holy Land.

Political relationships between the Muslim caliphates and the Christian kingdoms of Europe remained in a state of suspended truce, allowing the continuation of Christian pilgrimages into Muslim-controlled lands, at least in intervals; for example, the Fatimid Caliph al-Hakim bi-Amr Allah ordered the destruction of the Church of the Holy Sepulchre, only to have his successor allow the Byzantine Empire to rebuild it.

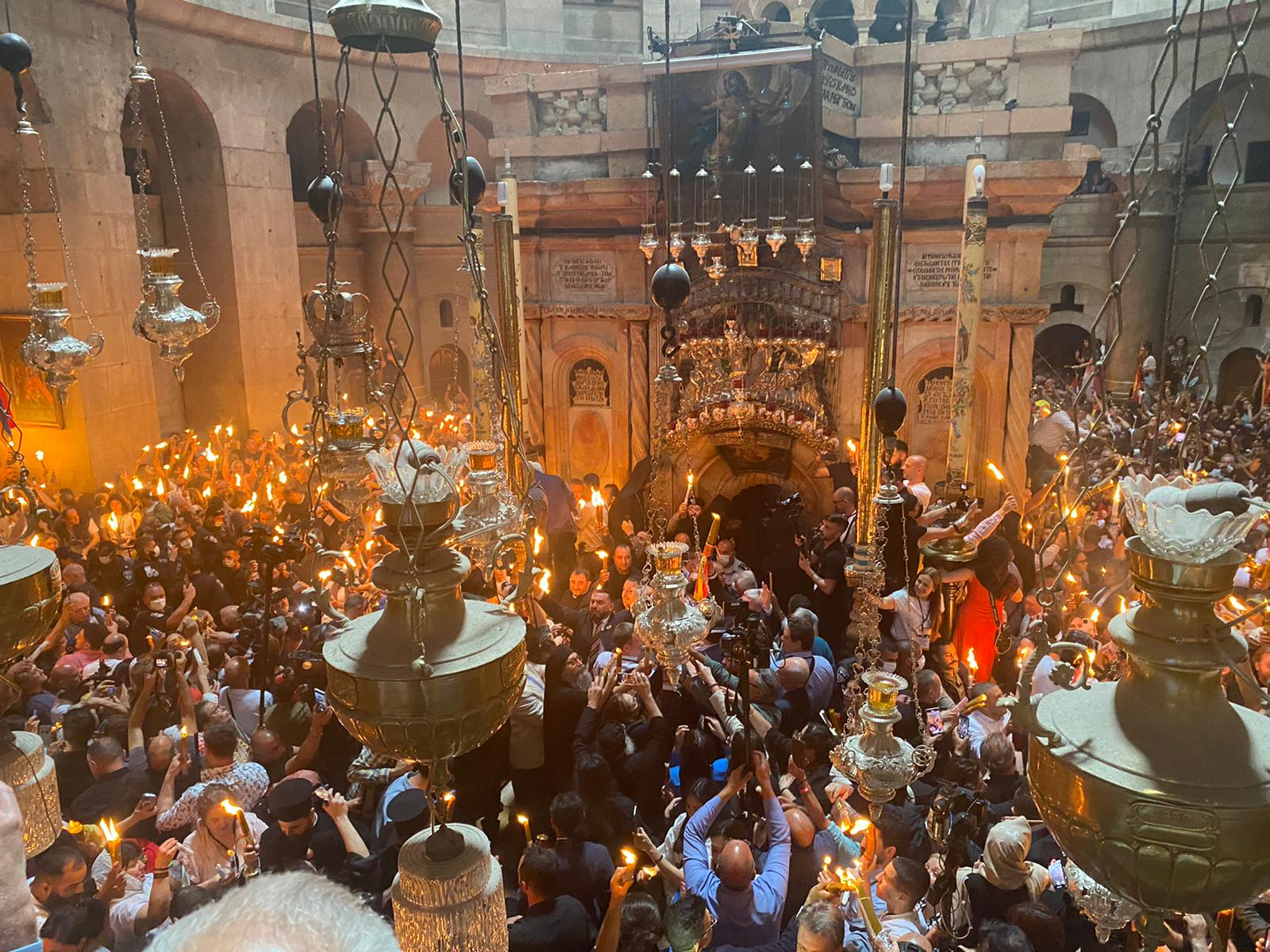
Holy Fire ceremony in the Church of the Holy Sepulchre, Jerusalem, 2022

The Crusades were at first a success, the Crusader states, especially the kingdom of Jerusalem, guaranteeing safe access to the Holy Land for Christian pilgrims during the 12th century, but Palestine was re-conquered by the Muslim Ayyubids by the end of the 13th century.

Under the Ottoman Empire travel in Palestine was once again restricted and dangerous. Modern pilgrimages in the Holy Land may be said to have received an early impetus from the scholar Ernest Renan, whose twenty-four days in Palestine, recounted in his Vie de Jésus (published 1863) found the resonance of the New Testament at every turn.

=== Europe ===
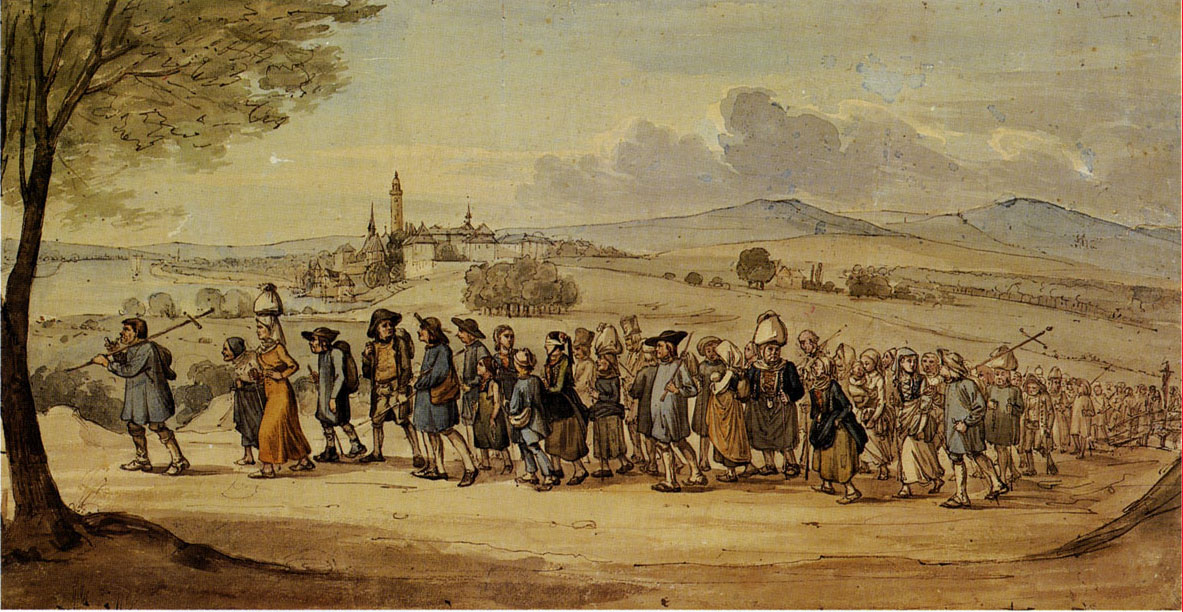
Pilgrimage to the Blood miracle of Walldürn, circa 1845

==== Santiago de Compostela, Spain ====
According to Christian tradition, at some point between 818 and 842 during the reign of Alfonso II of Asturias, bishop Theodemar of Iria (d. 847) found the remains of Saint James the Greater. Around the place of the discovery a new settlement and centre of pilgrimage emerged, which was known to the author Usuard in 865 and by the 10th century was called Compostella. The Way of St James became a major pilgrimage route of medieval Christianity from the 10th century onwards.

Pope Alexander VI officially declared the Camino de Santiago to be one of the "three great pilgrimages of Christendom", along with Jerusalem and the Via Francigena to Rome. In the 12th century, under the impulse of bishop Diego Gelmírez, Compostela became an archbishopric, attracting a large and multinational population. Pope Benedict XVI said, "It is a way sown with so many demonstrations of fervour, repentance, hospitality, art and culture which speak to us eloquently of the spiritual roots of the Old Continent." Many still follow its routes as a form of spiritual path or retreat for their spiritual growth. It is also popular with hikers, cyclers, and organized tour groups.

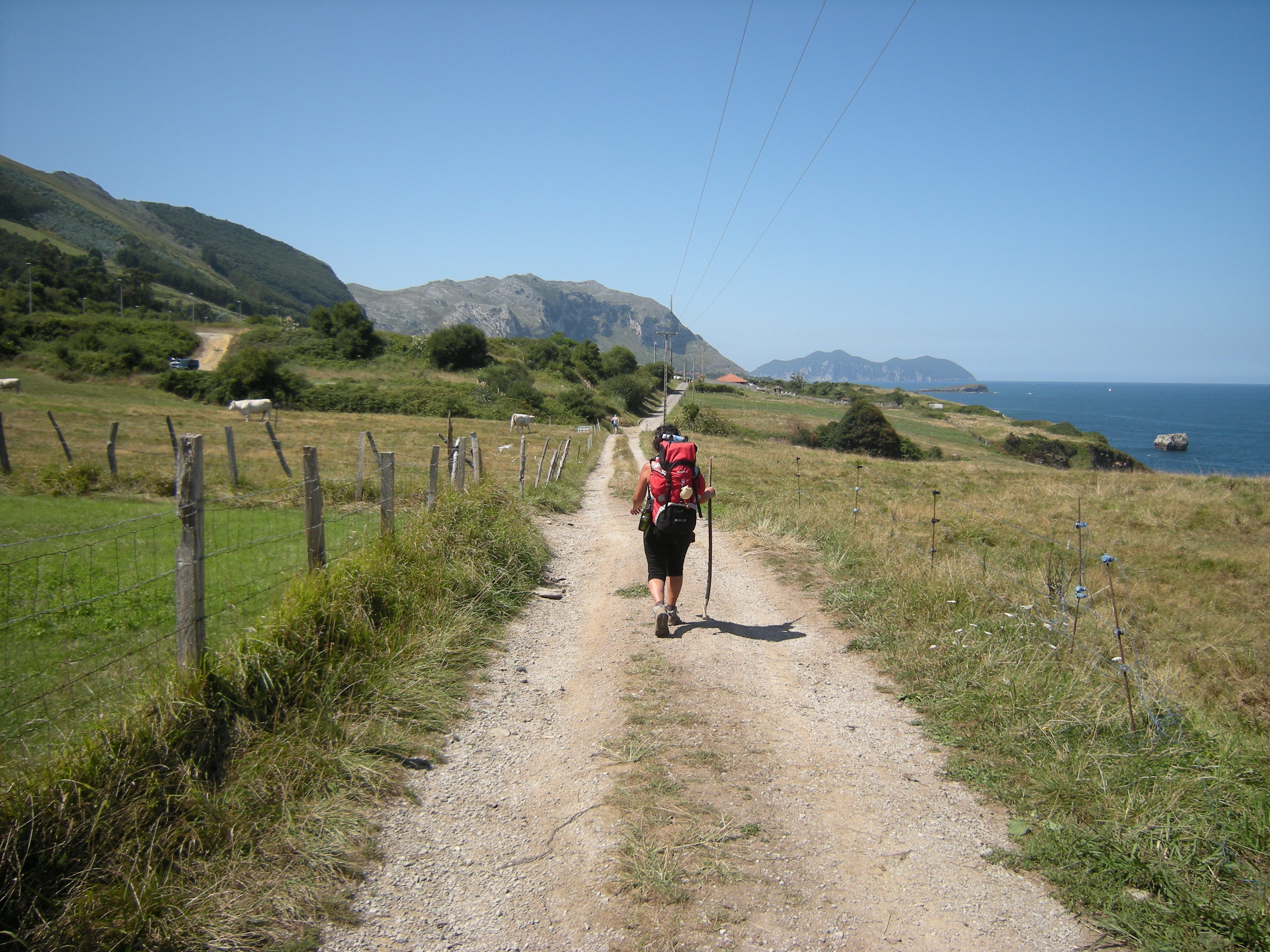
Pilgrims of Way of Saint James in Cantabria

In 1987, the Camino, which encompasses several routes in Spain, France and Portugal, was declared the first Cultural Route of the Council of Europe. Since 2013, the Camino has attracted more than 200,000 pilgrims each year, with an annual growth rate of more than 10 percent. Pilgrims come mainly on foot and often from nearby cities, requiring several days of walking to reach Santiago. The French Way gathers two-thirds of the walkers, but other minor routes are experiencing a growth in popularity. The French Way and the Northern routes in Spain were inscribed on the UNESCO World Heritage List, followed by the routes in France in 1998, because of their historical significance for Christianity as a major pilgrimage route and their testimony to the exchange of ideas and cultures across the routes.

==== Rome ====
Rome has been a major Christian pilgrimage site since the Middle Ages. Pilgrimages to Rome can involve visits to a large number of sites, both within the Vatican City and in Italian territory. A popular stopping point is the Pilate's stairs: these are, according to the Christian tradition, the steps that led up to the praetorium of Pontius Pilate in Jerusalem, which Jesus Christ stood on during his Passion on his way to trial. The stairs were, reputedly, brought to Rome by St. Helena in the 4th century. For centuries, the Scala Santa has attracted Christian pilgrims who wished to honour the Passion of Jesus.

Several catacombs built in the Roman age are also the object of pilgrimage, where Christians prayed, buried their dead and performed worship during periods of persecution. And various national churches (among them San Luigi dei francesi and Santa Maria dell'Anima), or churches associated with individual religious orders, such as the Jesuit Church of the Gesù and Sant'Ignazio.

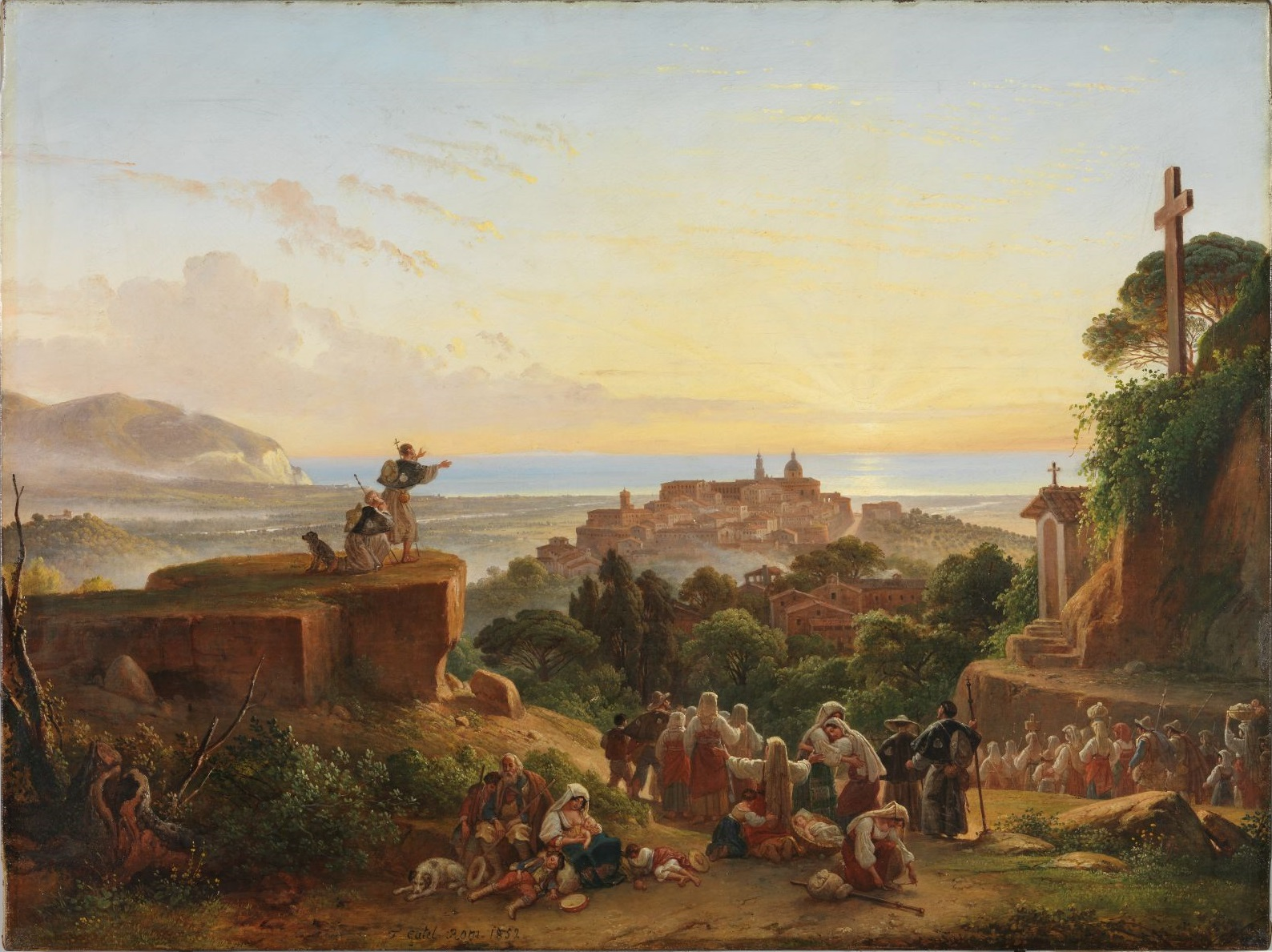
Catholic pilgrims in Italy, by Franz Ludwig Catel, 1852

Traditionally, pilgrims in Rome visit the seven pilgrim churches (Italian: Le sette chiese) in 24 hours. This custom, mandatory for each pilgrim in the Middle Ages, was codified in the 16th century by Saint Philip Neri. The seven churches are the four major Basilicas (St Peter in Vatican, St Paul outside the Walls, St John in Lateran and Santa Maria Maggiore), while the other three are San Lorenzo fuori le mura (a palaeochristian Basilica), Santa Croce in Gerusalemme (a church founded by Helena, the mother of Constantine, which hosts fragments of wood attributed to the holy cross) and San Sebastiano fuori le mura (which lies on the Appian Way and is built above Roman catacombs).

==== Romería ====
A romería (Spanish) or romaria (Portuguese) is a type of yearly, short distance Roman Catholic religious pilgrimage practiced in the Iberian Peninsula and countries formerly colonized by Spain and Portugal. The term comes from romero/romeiro, meaning a person travelling to Rome. The travelling can be done in cars, floats, on horseback or on foot, and its destination is a sanctuary or hermitage consecrated to a religious figure honored in that day's feast. Besides attending religious services and processions, the pilgrims may also engage in social events like singing, feasting and dancing.

One of the most famous examples of a pilgrimage is that of Nuestra Señora del Rocío, in which the faithful move to the Sanctuary of the Virgen del Rocío in the village of the Rocío, in Almonte, Huelva. In the 21st century the Romería has brought together roughly a million pilgrims each year. The Romeria of Sant John of the Mountain, celebrated in Miranda de Ebro, is the second most important romeria in Spain behind El Rocío with more than 25,000 romeros.

Another one of the most representative examples is the Romería de la Virgen de la Cabeza (Andújar, Jaén), which is considered the oldest pilgrimages of Spain, and consists of the displacement of the travellers coming from all over the country to the Sanctuary of the Virgen de la Cabeza, through 33 km of Andújar, in the heart of Sierra de Andujar natural park. This celebration is held the last Sunday of April and is considered of national tourist interest.

The Romería de la Virgin de Navahonda, celebrated in spring in the Madrilenian municipality of Robledo de Chavela is representative of this tradition.

There are also pilgrimages in the Canary Islands. An example is La Romería de Santiago Apostol, in Gáldar. Instead of focusing on Jesus, the floats usually praise the Virgin Mary with pictures and statues.

==== Lourdes, France ====
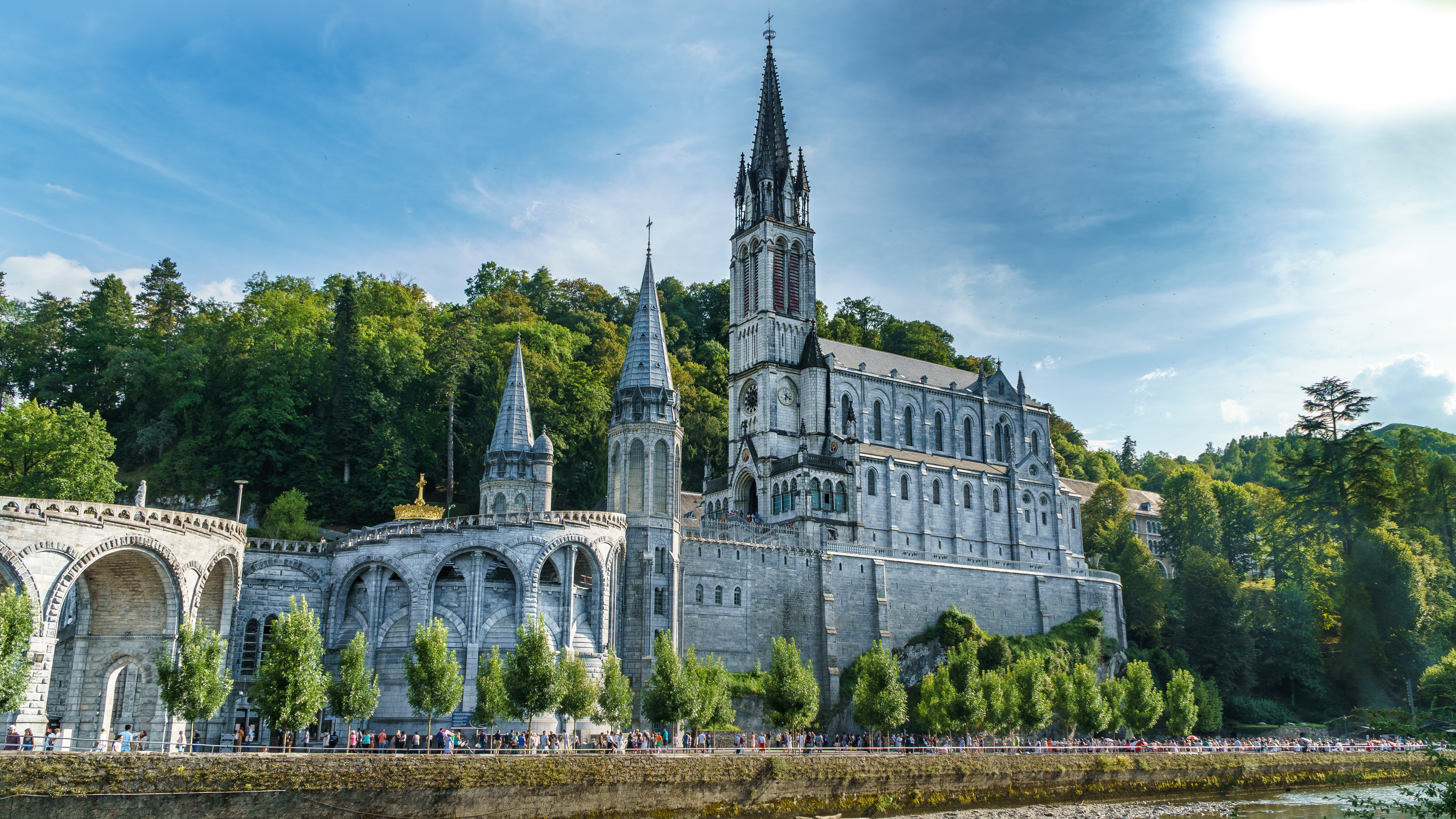
Sanctuary of Our Lady of Lourdes

According to believers, the Blessed Virgin Mary appeared to Saint Bernadette Soubirous on a total of eighteen occasions at Lourdes (Lorda in her local Occitan language). As a result, Lourdes became a major place of Roman Catholic pilgrimage and of miraculous healings. Today Lourdes receives up to 5,000,000 tourists every season. With about 270 hotels, Lourdes has the second greatest number of hotels per square kilometer in France after Paris. Some of the deluxe hotels like Grand Hotel Moderne, Hotel Grand de la Grotte, Hotel Saint Etienne, Hotel Majestic and Hotel Roissy are located here.

==== Maastricht-Aachen-Kornelimünster, Germany and Netherlands ====
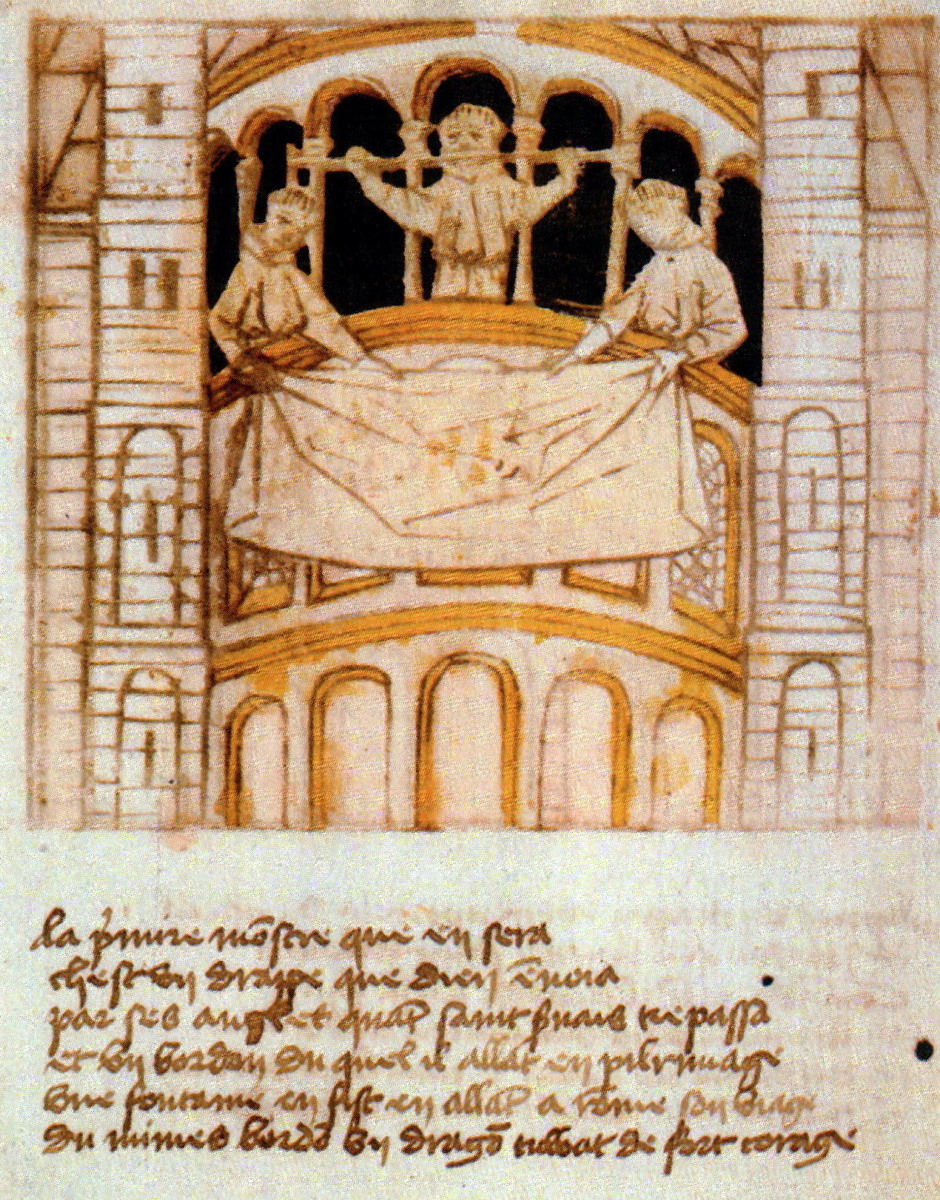
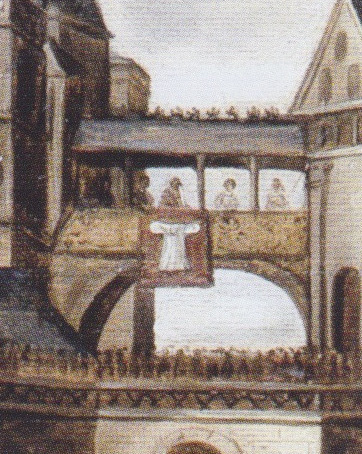
Relics being shown from the dwarf gallery of the Basilica of Saint Servatius in Maastricht, ca. 1460 (left) and from the tower gallery of Aachen Cathedral in 1622

Combined septennial pilgrimages in the Dutch-German towns of Maastricht, Aachen and Kornelimünster were held at least since the 14th century. The German word Heiligtumsfahrt means "journey to the holy relics". In all three places important relics could be seen: in Maastricht relics of the True Cross, the girdle of Mary, the arm of Saint Thomas and various relics of Saint Servatius; in Aachen the nappy and loin cloth of Jesus, the dress of Mary, the decapitation cloth of John the Baptist, and the remains of Charlemagne; and in Kornelimünster the loincloth, the sudarium and the shroud of Jesus, as well as the skull of Pope Cornelius. In Maastricht some relics were shown from the dwarf gallery of St Servatius' Church to the pilgrims gathered in the square; in Aachen the same was done from the purpose-built tower gallery between the dome and the westwork tower of Aachen Cathedral. The popularity of the Maastricht-Aachen-Kornelimünster pilgrimage reached its zenith in the 15th century when up to 140,000 pilgrims visited these towns in mid-July. After a break of about 150 years, the pilgrimages were revived in the 19th century. The Aachen and Kornelimünster pilgrimages are still synchronised but the Maastricht pilgrimage takes place 3 years earlier. In 2011 the Maastricht pilgrimage drew around 175,000 visitors; Aachen had in 2014 around 125,000 pilgrims.

==== Fátima, Portugal ====
Marian apparitions are also responsible for millions of tourists worldwide and the internationally renowned Sanctuary of Fátima in Portugal is among the most visited Marian shrines in the world.

Panoramic view of the Sanctuary of Our Lady of Fátima in Portugal

==== Vadstena, Sweden ====
Vadstena Abbey Church (Swedish: Vadstena Klosterkyrka), part of the Diocese of Linköping of the Evangelical-Lutheran Church of Sweden, is a popular place of Christian pilgrimage. During the summer months, Vadstena Abbey Church receives between 2500 to 3000 pilgrims daily and for this, the Diocese of Linköping mantains a Pilgrim Center in the complex. The Mass and Divine Office, according to the Evangelical-Lutheran tradition, are celebrated in Vadstena Abbey Church daily. St Bridget of Sweden stated that she received the direction on how to build Vadstena Abbey Church from Jesus himself, making Vadstena Abbey Church a divine concept. On 16 February 1430, Vadstena Abbey Church was consecrated. Vadstena Abbey Church contains the relics of Saint Bridget, which are venerated by the pilgrims, and annually, a celebration of the Feast of Saint Bridget occurs on July 23, with the offering of the Mass at Vadstena Abbey Church, including an elaborate church procession. A number of Swedish Christians additionally visit Vadstena Abbey Church in order to pay homage to various Christian personalities, including Catherine of Vadstena and Magnus, Duke of Östergötland, among others. As a popular place of Evangelical-Lutheran pilgrimage, Christians reach Vadstena Abbey Church through the Saint Birgitta Ways, using The Pilgrim's Prayer Book (Pilgrimens tidegärd) throughout the day; the first of the three prayers in The Pilgrim's Prayer Book are the same prayers said daily at at 8 am, 12 pm and 4 pm at Vadstena Abbey Church. During their journey to Vadstena Abbey Evangelical-Lutheran Church, pilgrims pause along the Saint Birgitta Ways trails to pray from this prayer book (which functions as a small breviary to pray the canonical hours). Upon arrival to Vadstena Abbey Church, Evangelical-Lutheran pilgrims attend the celebration of Mass and receive the Eucharist there. Those who complete the Christian pilgrimage to Vadstena Abbey Evangelical-Lutheran Church are bestowed with a pilgrim certificate from Vadstena Abbey Evangelical-Lutheran Church.

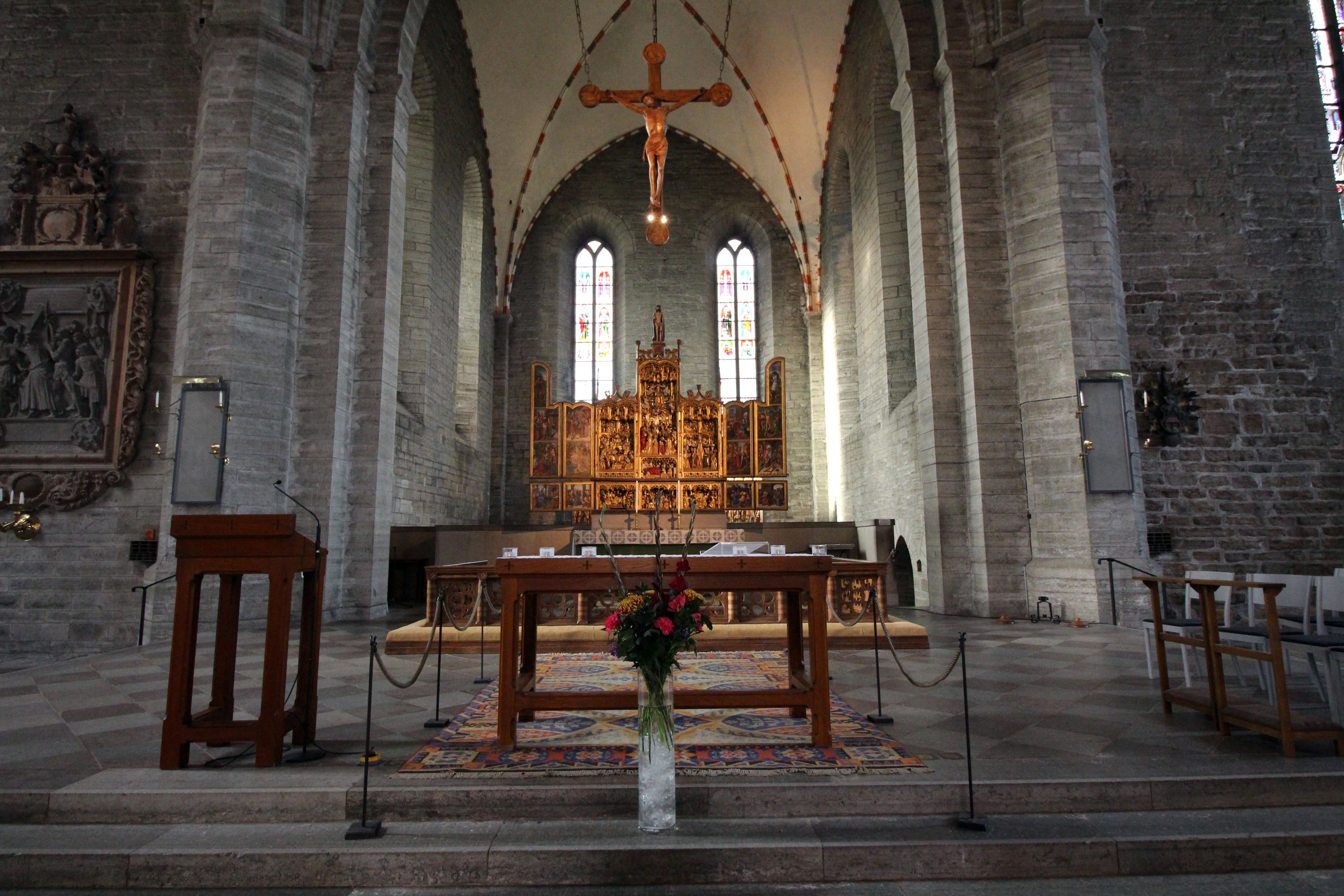
The chancel of Vadstena Abbey Evangelical-Lutheran Church

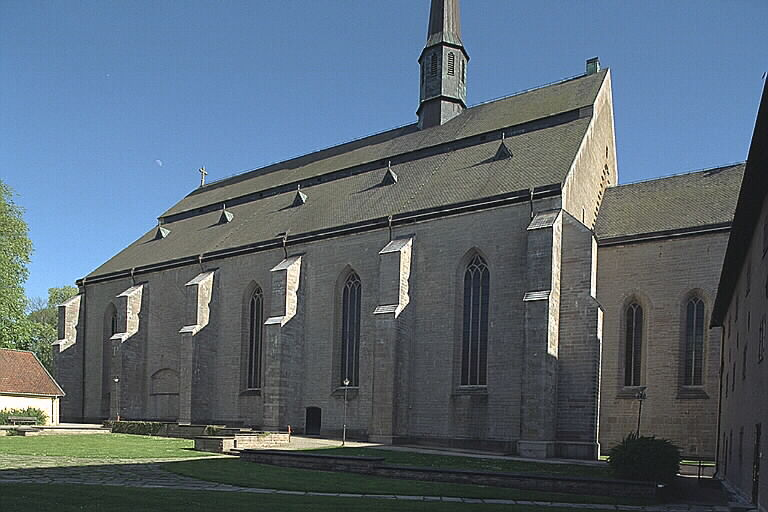
The exterior of Vadstena Abbey Church, with the base of the steeple visible

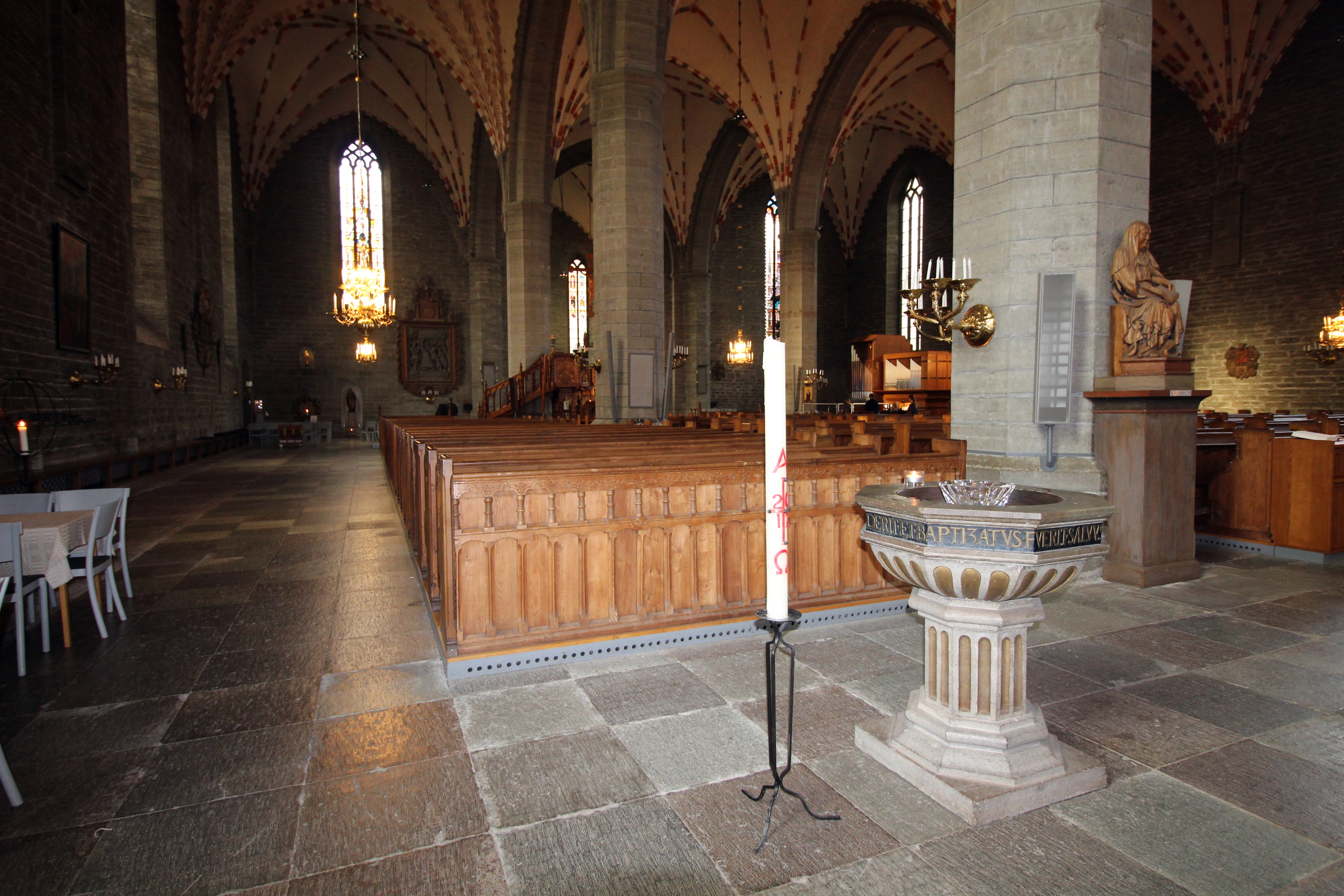
A statue of Saint Bridget of Sweden in Vadstena Abbey Evangelical-Lutheran Church

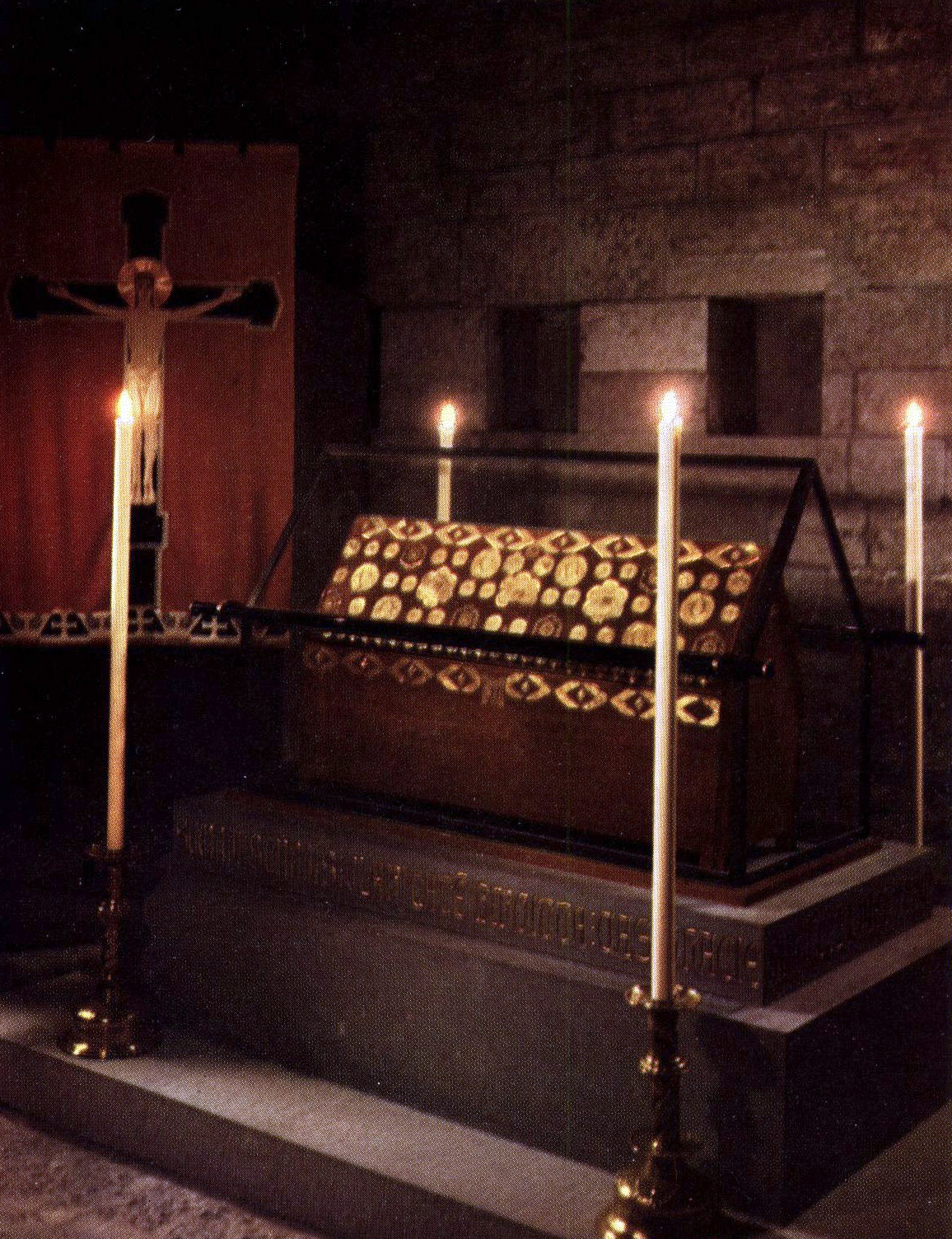
The casket of Saint Bridget of Sweden at Vadstena Abbey Church

==== Trondheim, Norway ====
Nidaros Cathedral is a popular place of Christian pilgrimage, particularly for those of the Evangelical-Lutheran tradition. Saint Olaf had brought Christianity to Norway, with the people of the country converting to the faith. After his death in the Battle of Stiklestad, he was recognized as a Christian martyr and subsequently canonized as a saint in the Western Christian Church. According to Christian tradition, miracles occurred at his tomb in Trondheim. A church, which eventually became the grand Nidaros Evangelical-Lutheran Cathedral, was built over his grave.

Pilgrims reach Nidaros Cathedral by travelling the historic Pilgrim's Route (Norwegian: Pilegrimsleden) as an act of sacrifice offered to God, as well as to pay homage to Saint Olaf. Upon arrival to Nidaros Cathedral, Christian pilgrims traditionally walk around it thrice, and then enter it reverently, with a prayerful state of mind. Mass and the Divine Office, according to the Evangelical-Lutheran tradition, are celebrated daily at Nidaros Cathedral, in addition to other prayer services that are held there throughout the day. Christian pilgrims complete their pilgrimage to Nidaros Cathedral by attending Mass there and receiving the Eucharist. Those who complete their pilgrimage are bestowed with a pilgrim certificate that is granted by Nidaros Cathedral.

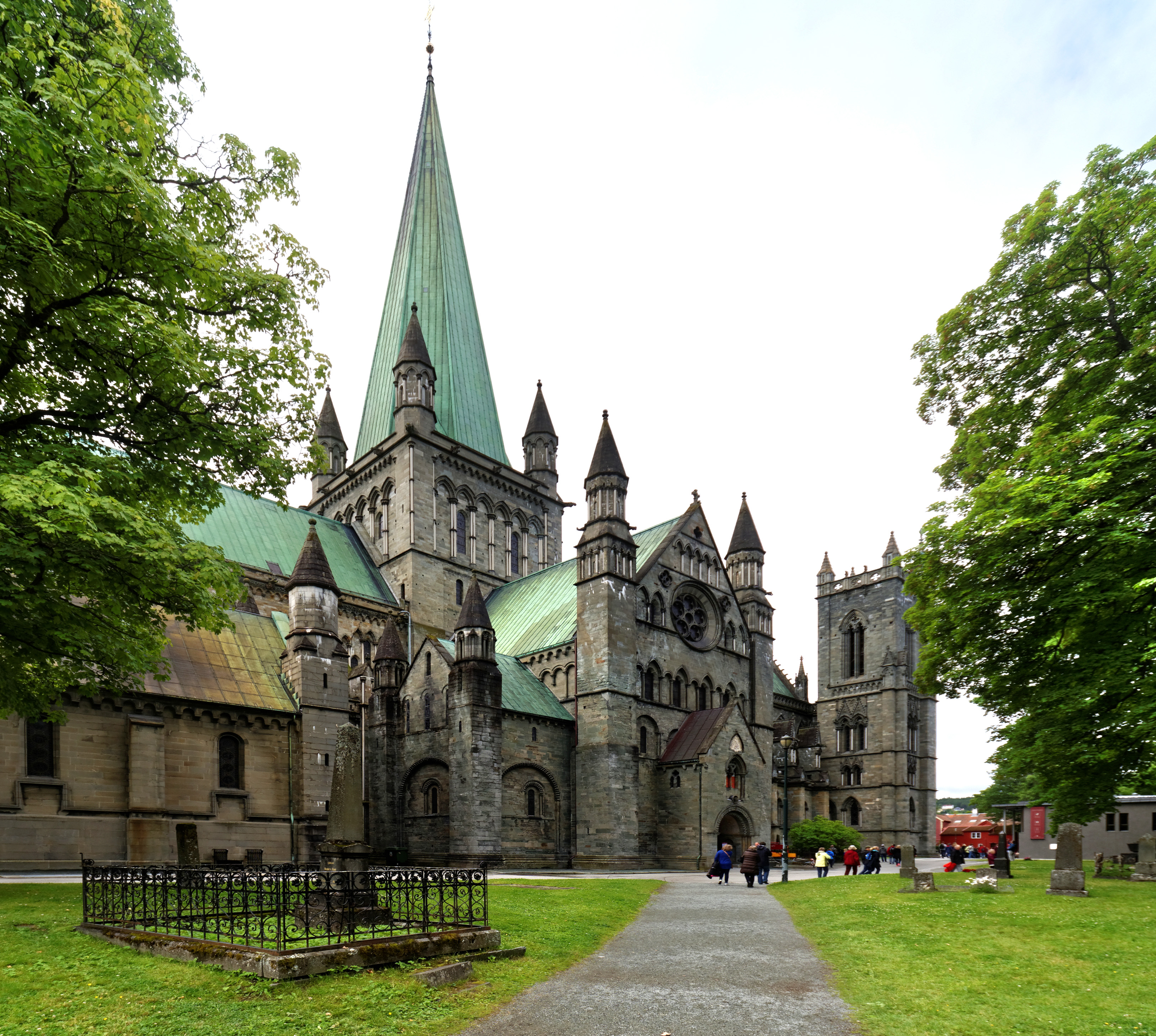
The exterior of Nidaros Evangelical-Lutheran Cathedral

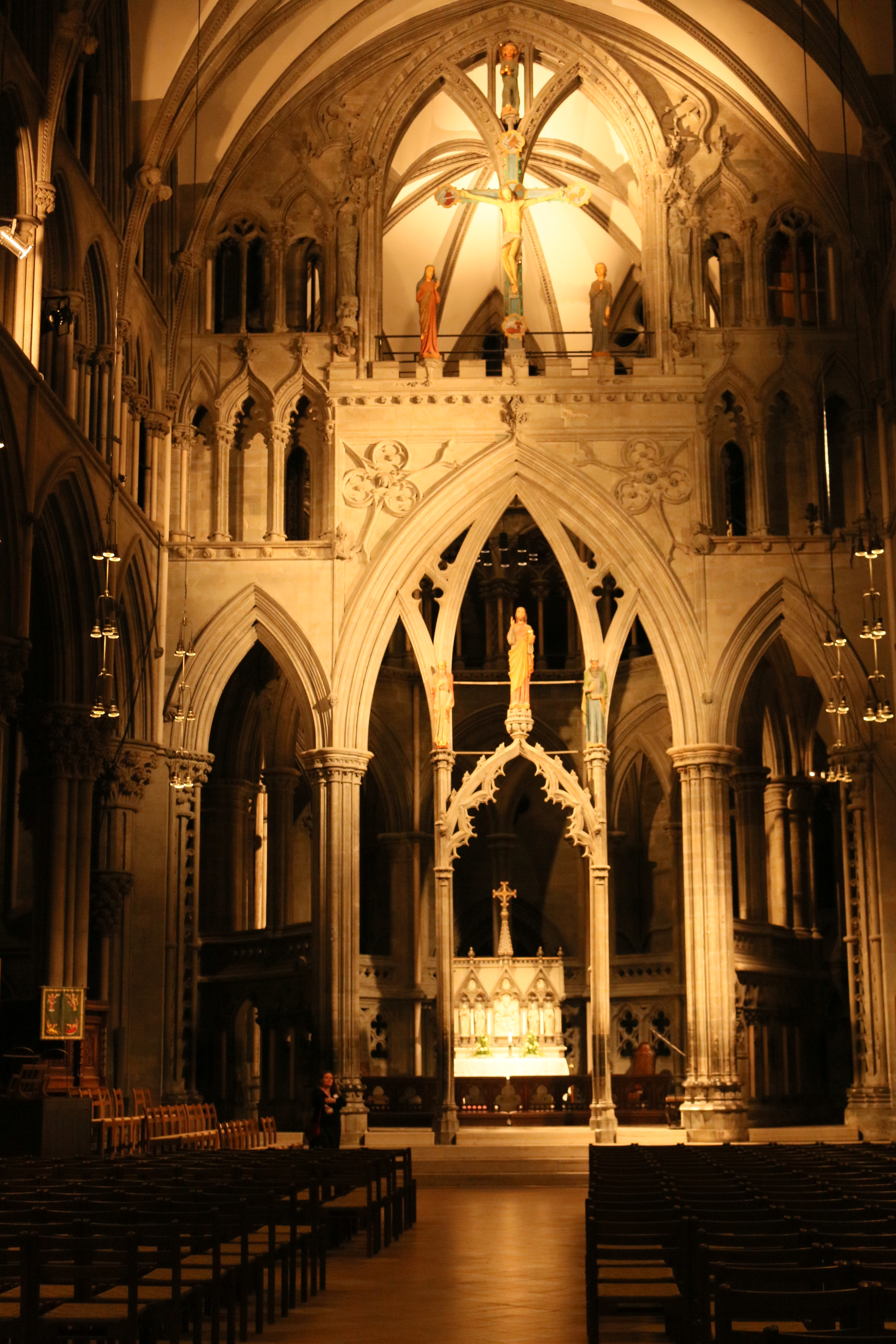
The chancel of Nidaros Evangelical-Lutheran Cathedral

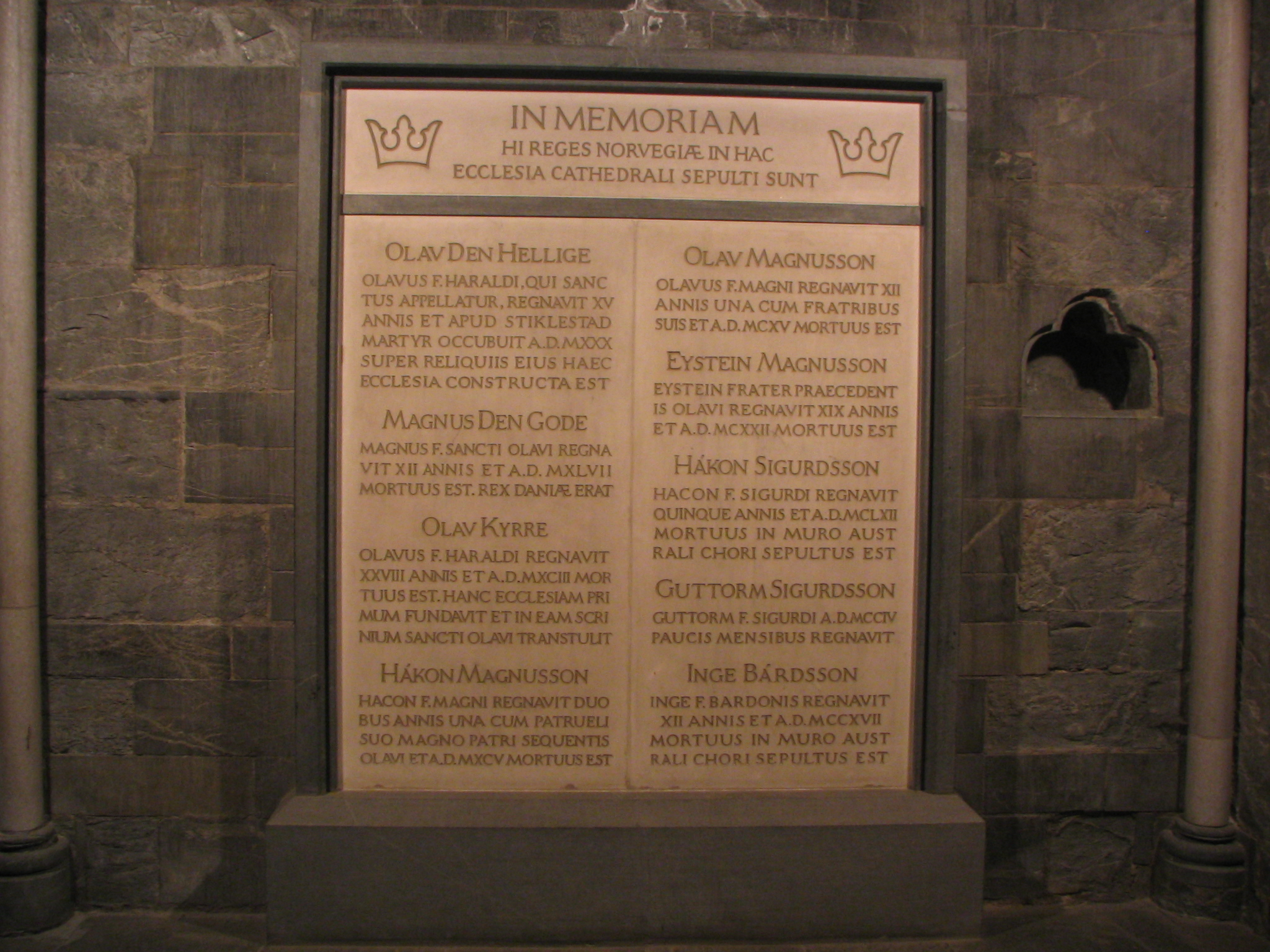
A plaque in Nidaros Evangelical-Lutheran Cathedral devoted to Saint Olaf

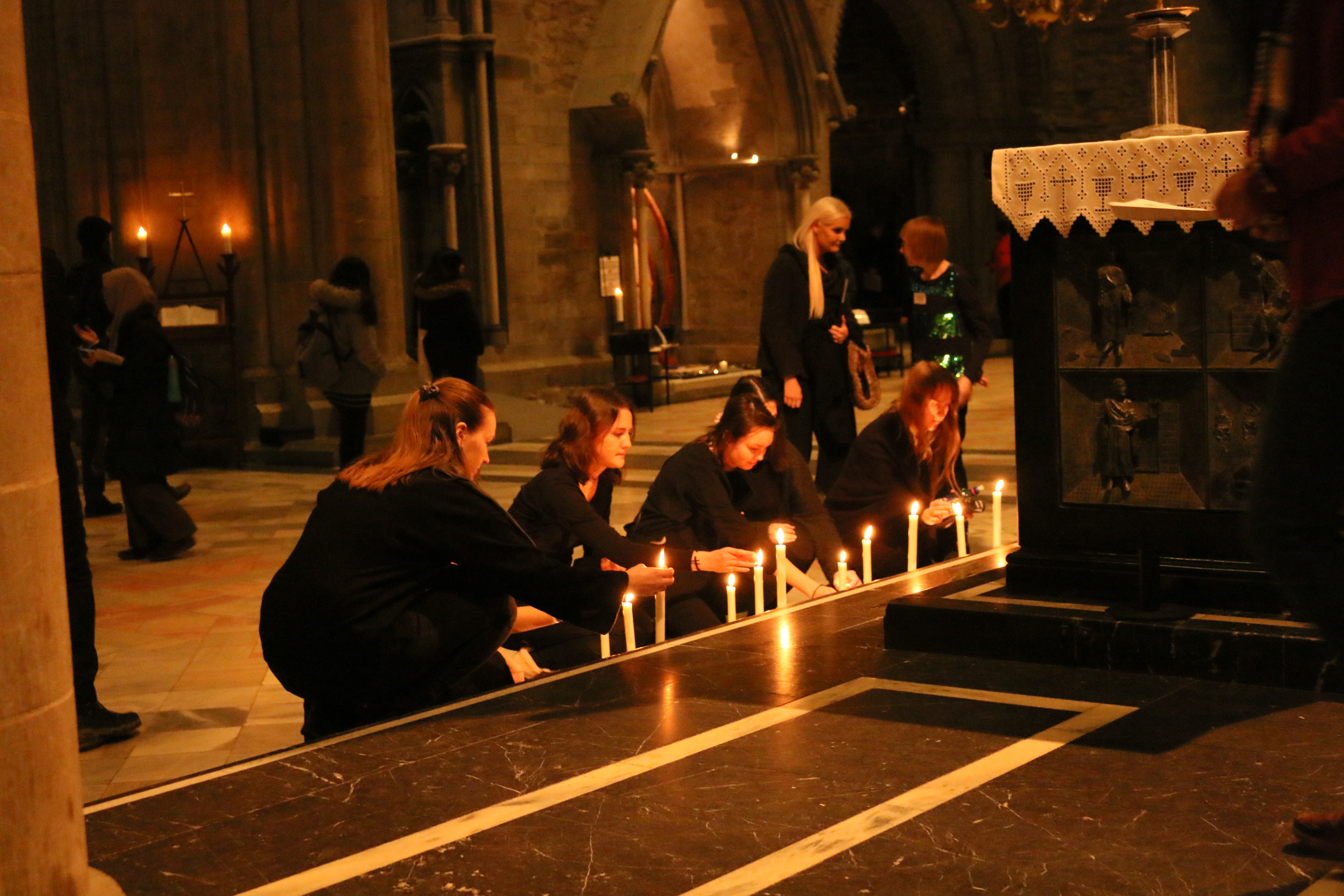
Candles lit by pilgrims who arrived at Nidaros Evangelical-Lutheran Cathedral

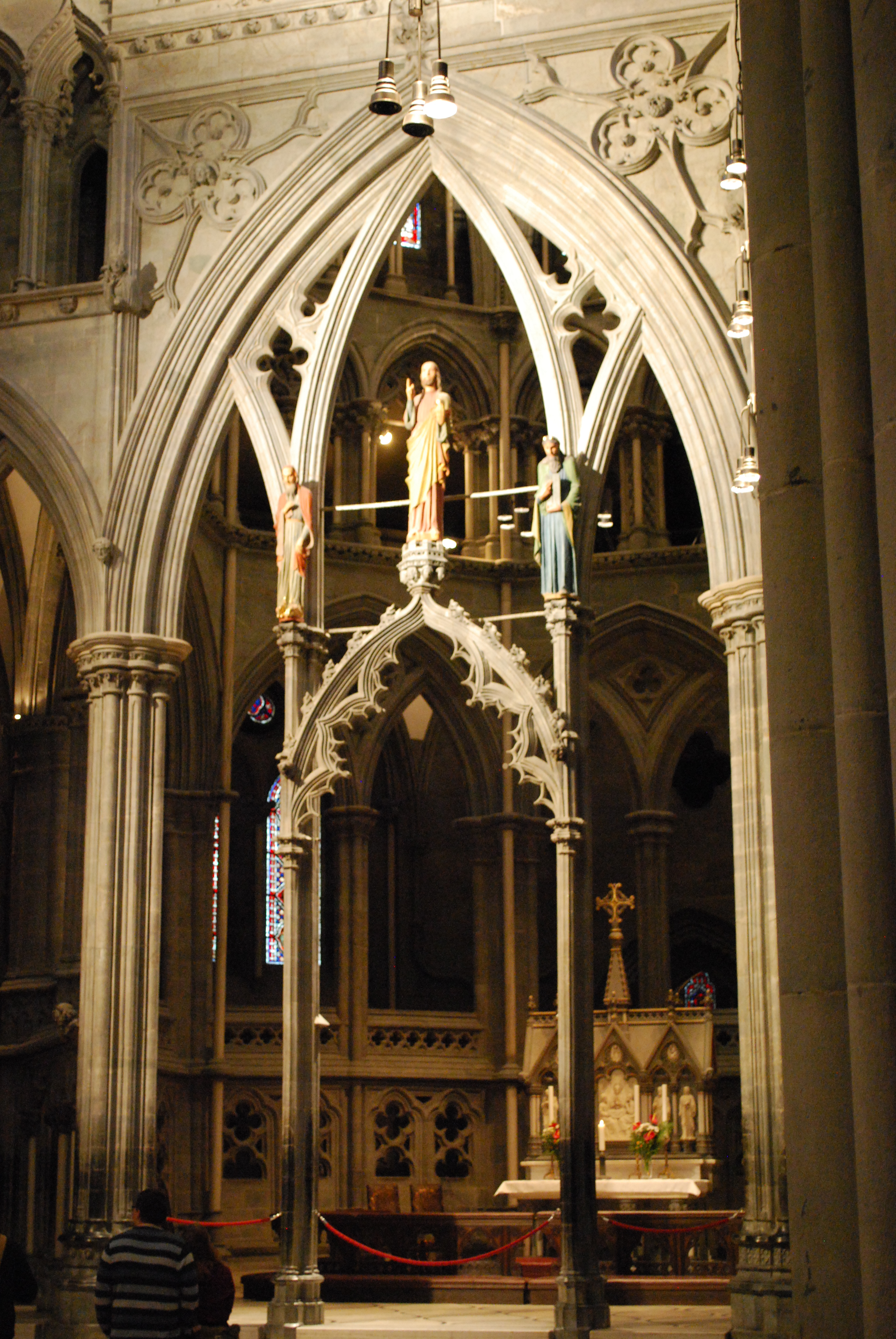
The rood screen of Nidaros Evangelical-Lutheran Cathedral

==== Canterbury, England ====
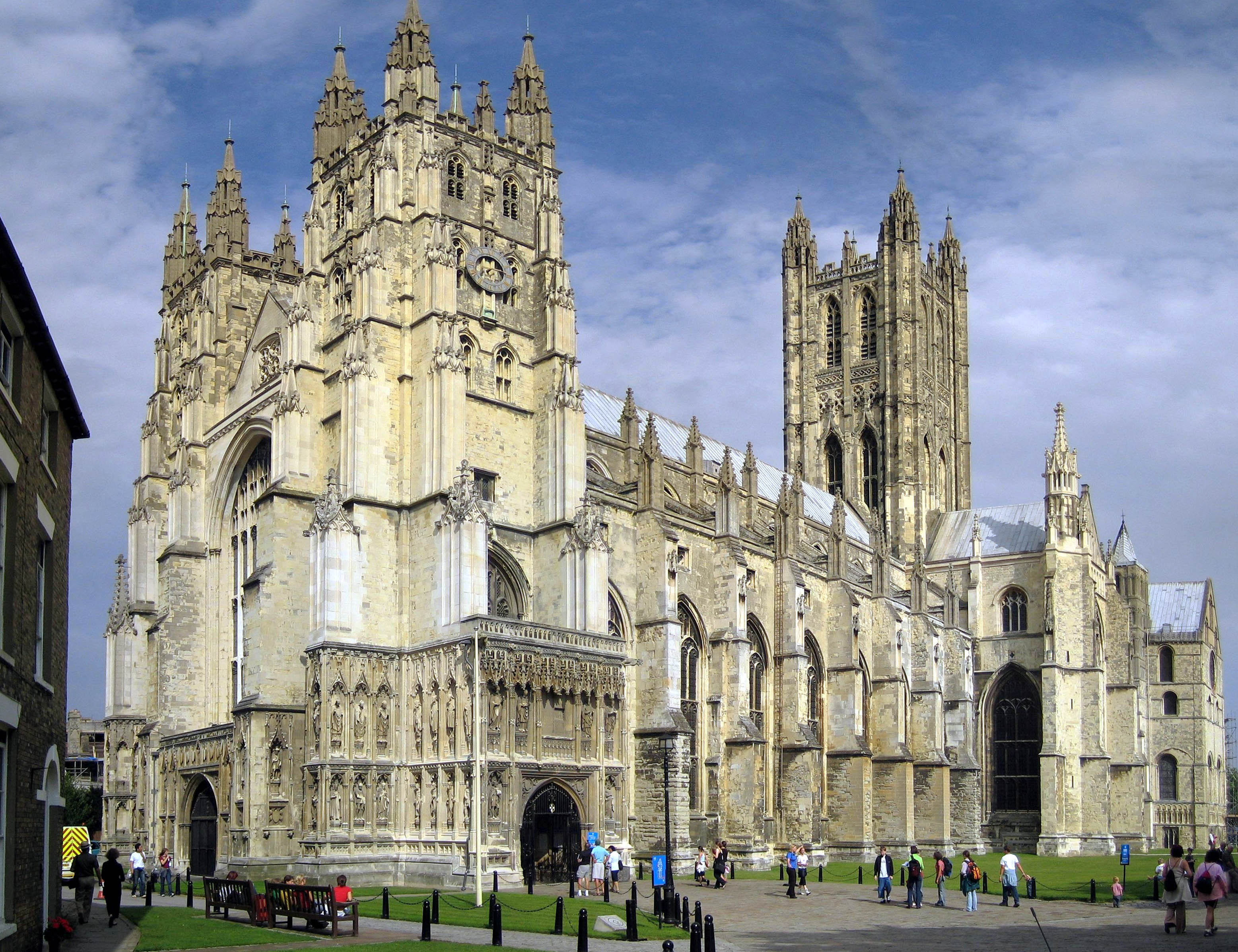
Canterbury Cathedral

After the murder of the Archbishop Thomas Becket at the cathedral in 1170, Canterbury became one of the most notable towns in Europe, as pilgrims from all parts of Christendom came to visit his shrine. This pilgrimage provided the framework for Geoffrey Chaucer's 14th-century collection of stories, The Canterbury Tales. Canterbury Castle was captured by the French Prince Louis during his 1215 invasion of England, before the death of John caused his English supporters to desert his cause and support the young Henry III.

During the Dissolution of the Monasteries, the city's priory, nunnery and three friaries were closed. St Augustine's Abbey, the 14th richest in England at the time, was surrendered to the Crown, and its church and cloister were levelled. The rest of the abbey was dismantled over the next 15 years, although part of the site was converted to a palace. Thomas Becket's shrine in the cathedral was demolished and all the gold, silver and jewels were removed to the Tower of London, and Becket's images, name and feasts were obliterated throughout the kingdom, ending the pilgrimages.

==== Jasna Góra, Poland ====
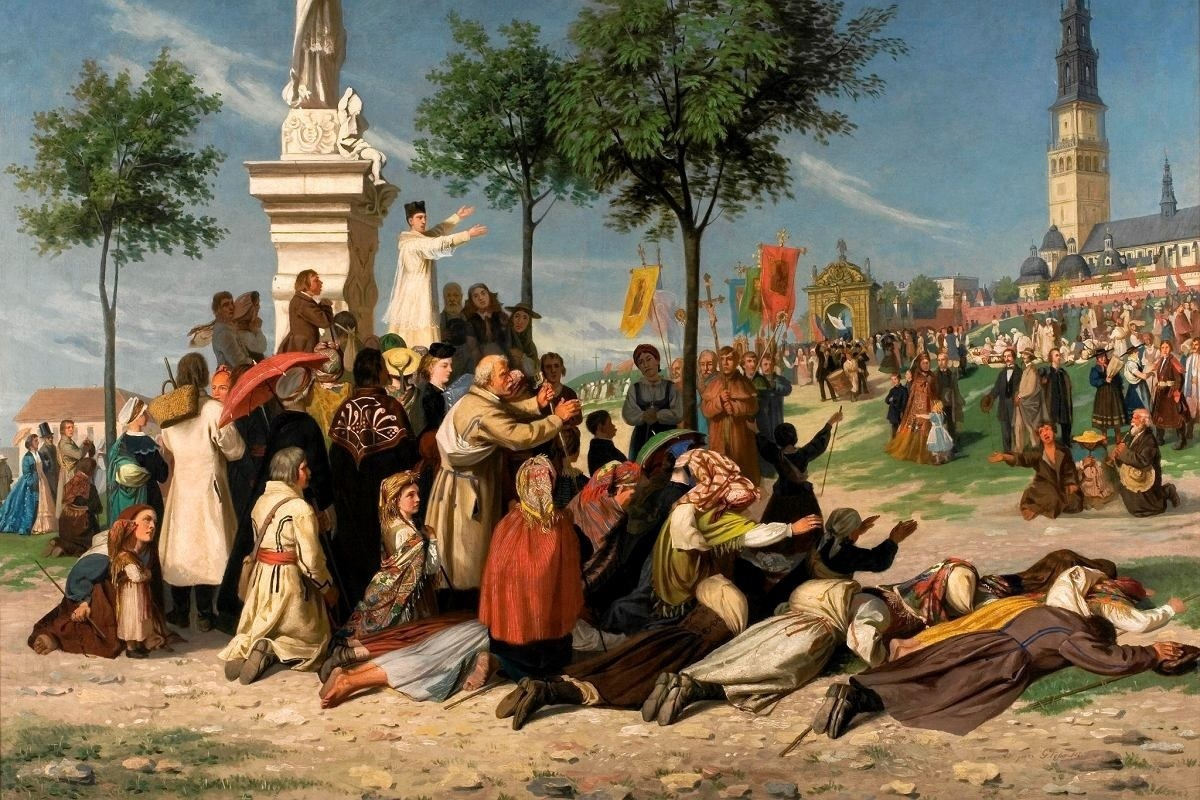
Pilgrims arriving at Jasna Góra, 1868

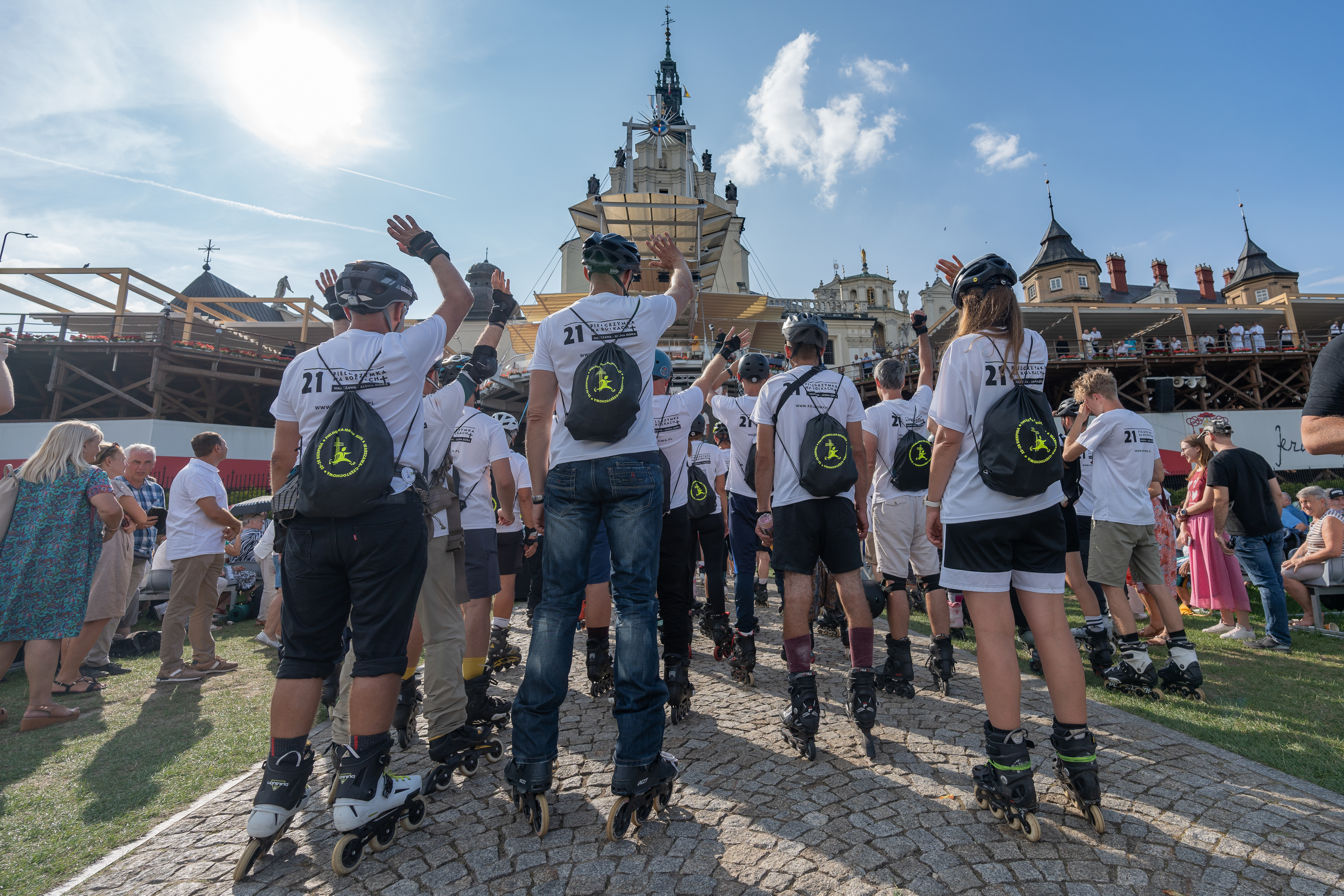
A roller-skating pilgrimage to Jasna Góra in 2024

There are 96 pilgrimage sites in Poland, but none is as popular as Jasna Góra in the center of Częstochowa.

Jasna Góra in Częstochowa is a pilgrimage site with a long tradition. According to historical accounts, in 1382 Prince Władysław of Opole brought the Paulines from Hungary, marking the beginning of the sanctuary’s development. The tradition of walking pilgrimages dates back to the 15th century, with the earliest documented group (from Gliwice) arriving in 1626.

Jasna Góra is the most frequently visited Catholic shrine in Poland, with around 3 to 5 million visitors annually before the COVID-19 pandemic. In 2023, approximately 3.6 million pilgrims visited Jasna Góra. The sanctuary also ranks first in terms of walking pilgrimages: in 2002, it received 211 walking groups totaling 172,000 people, while in 2023 there were 228 walking groups, 200 cycling groups, 17 running groups, 2 skating pilgrimages, and 1 horseback pilgrimage—nearly 90,000 participants in total.

Major religious festivities take place during Easter and on anniversaries related to the Black Madonna, attracting pilgrims from all over Poland.

=== Latin America ===
Latin America has a number of pilgrimage sites, which have been studied by anthropologists, historians, and scholars of religion. In Mesoamerica, some predate the arrival of Europeans and were subsequently transformed to Christian pilgrimage sites.

==== Aparecida, Brazil ====
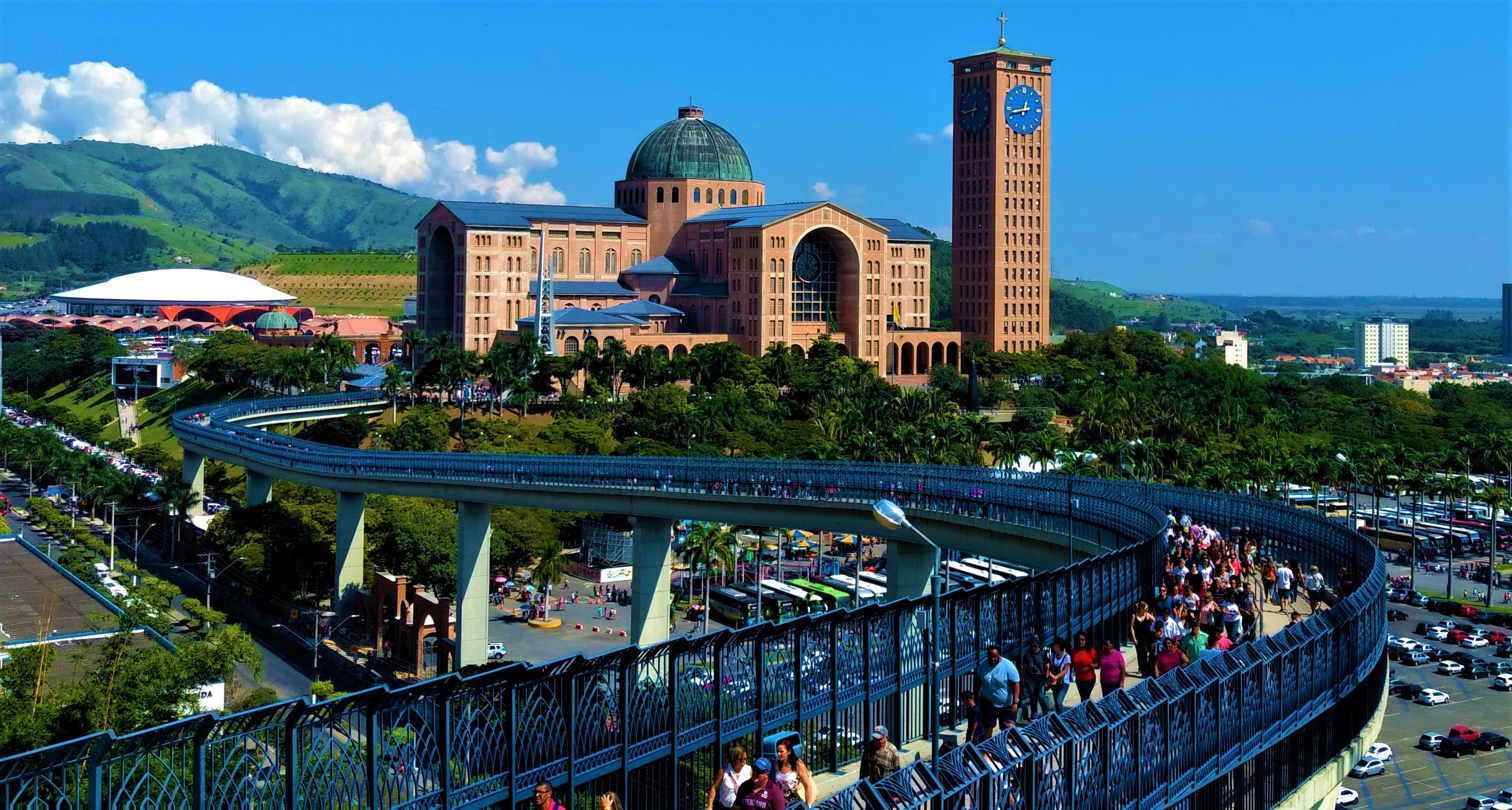
View of the walkway and the Basilica of Our Lady of Aparecida

Our Lady Aparecida is the patroness saint of Brazil. Venerated in the Catholic Church, Our Lady Aparecida is represented by a small terracotta image of Our Lady of the Immaculate Conception. Historical accounts state that the statue was originally found by three fishermen who miraculously caught many fish after invoking the Blessed Virgin Mary. The statue is currently housed in the Basilica of Our Lady of Aparecida, located in the city of Aparecida, São Paulo. Every year the Basilica receives over 12 million worshipers and pilgrims.

There are six main routes that are usually taken. The largest one, The Path of Faith (O Caminho da Fé), is composed of approximately 970 km, of which approximately 500 km cross the Mantiqueira Mountains by dirt road, tracks, woods and asphalt, providing moments of reflection and faith, physical and psychological health and integration of man with the nature.

==== Guadalupe, Mexico ====
The Hill of Tepeyac now holding the Basilica of Our Lady of Guadalupe outside Mexico City, said to be the site of the apparition of the Virgin of Guadalupe.

==== Our Lady of Zapopan, Mexico ====
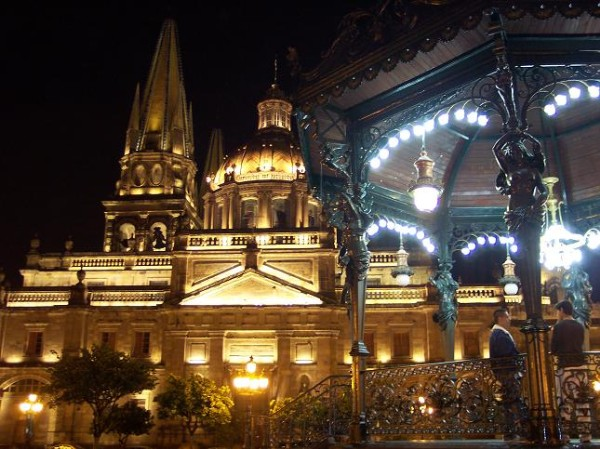
Neo-classical Guadalajara Cathedral

In Mexico, pilgrims walk to the Our Lady of Zapopan, which is considered the third most important peregrination in the country, after those of the Virgin of Guadalupe, and the Virgin of San Juan de los Lagos. The Pilgrimage of the Virgin of Zapopan consists of a route 8 km in length, from the Guadalajara Cathedral to the Basilica of Our Lady of Zapopan. It is made every 12 October, and figure of the virgin goes accompanied by more than 3,000,000 people.

==== El Quinche, Ecuador ====
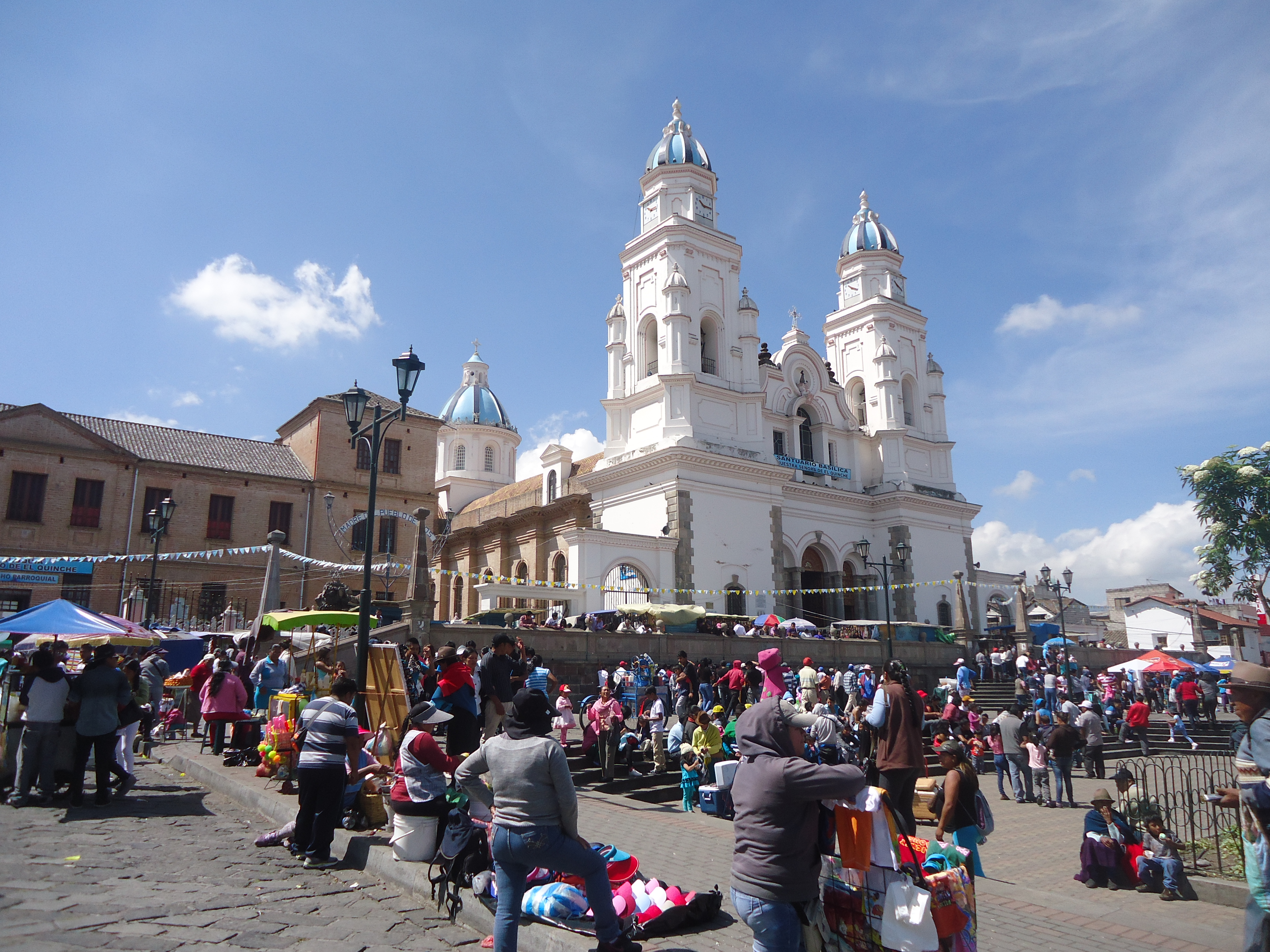
The Shrine of El Quinche.

Located 28 km east of the capital city, Quito, the pilgrimage takes place every 21 November at midnight. More than 800,000 pilgrims walk down a steep slope of 780 metres over the Guayllabamba River and uphill again to the Shrine of Our Lady of the Presentation of El Quinche, located at 2,680 m.a.s.l arriving at 6 a.m. Pope Francis visited El Quinche on 8 July 2015 and spoke to Roman Catholic clergy.

==== El Cisne, Ecuador ====
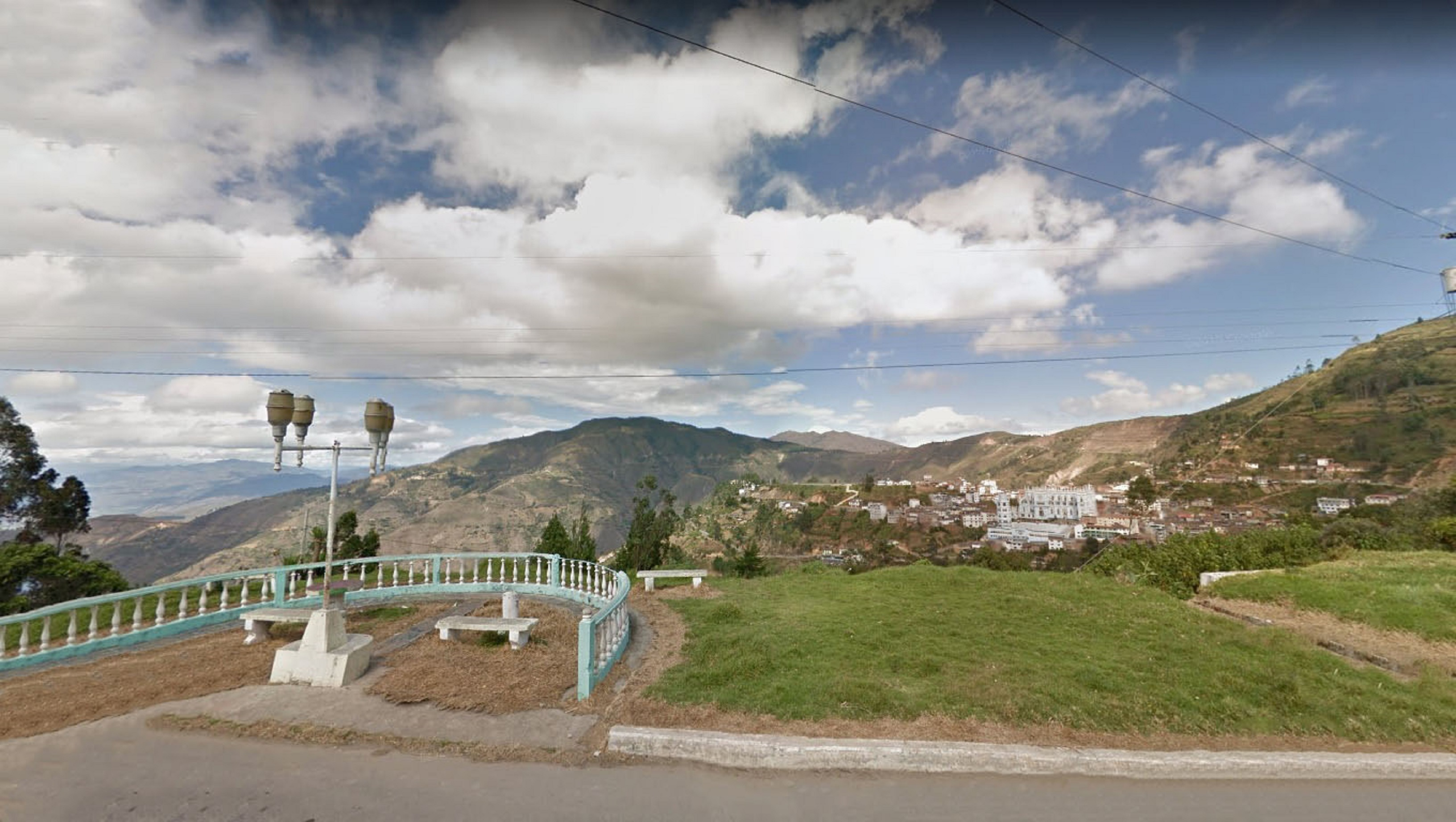
A lookout point on the way to El Cisne parrish. The white basilica can be seen in the distance.

El Cisne is a town in the southern region of Ecuador. Representatives of the city in 1594 requested sculptor Diego de Robles to build the statue of the Virgin of El Cisne which he carved from the wood of a cedar tree. Each year on 17 August, thousands of pilgrims gather in El Cisne to carry the statue about 74 km (46 mi) in a procession to the cathedral of Loja, where it is the focus of a great festival on 8 September upon with yet another procession taking place to return it to El Cisne.

==== Quyllurit'i, Peru ====
According to the Catholic Church, the festival is in honor of the Lord of Quyllurit'i (Quechua: Taytacha Quyllurit'i, Spanish: Señor de Quyllurit'i) and it originated in the late 18th century. The young native herder Mariano Mayta befriended a mestizo boy named Manuel on the mountain Qullqipunku. Thanks to Manuel, Mariano's herd prospered, so his father sent him to Cusco to buy a new shirt for Manuel. Mariano could not find anything similar, because that kind of cloth was sold only to the archbishop. Learning of this, the bishop of Cusco sent a party to investigate. When they tried to capture Manuel, he was transformed into a bush with an image of Christ crucified hanging from it. Thinking the archbishop's party had harmed his friend, Mariano died on the spot. He was buried under a rock, which became a place of pilgrimage known as the Lord of Quyllurit'i, or "Lord of Star (Brilliant) Snow." An image of Christ was painted on this boulder.

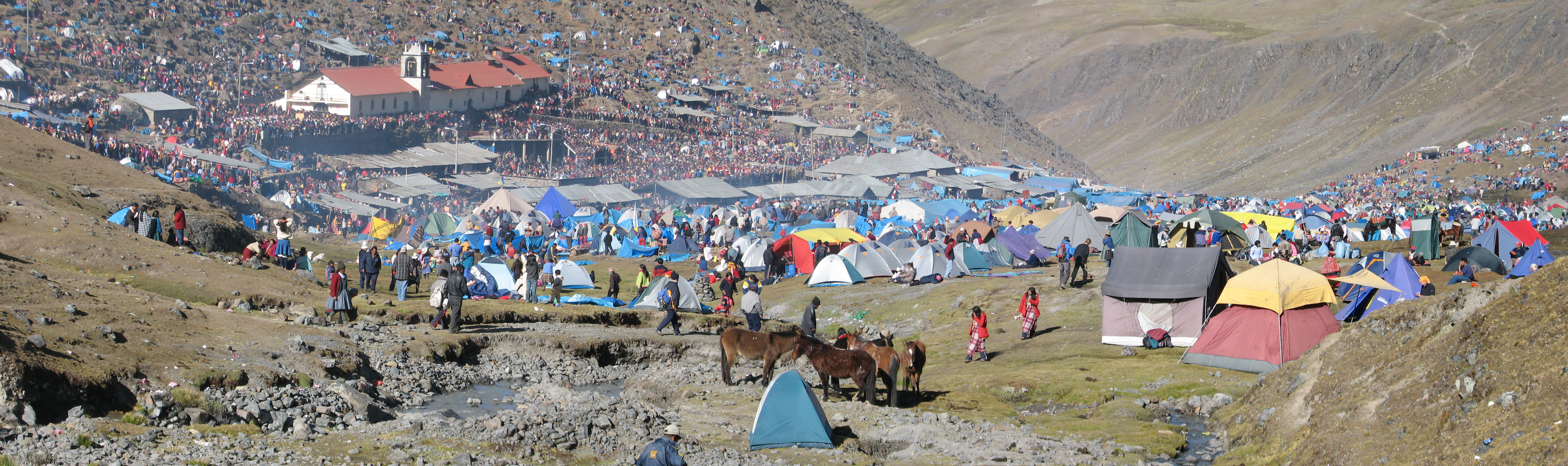
Panoramic view of the festival, with sanctuary church of Sinaqara in background

The Quyllurit'i festival attracts thousands of indigenous people from the surrounding regions, made up of Paucartambo groups (Quechua speakers) from the agricultural regions to the northwest of the shrine, and Quispicanchis (Aymara speakers) from the pastoral (herders) regions to the southeast, near Bolivia. Both moieties make an annual pilgrimage to the feast, bringing large troupes of dancers and musicians. Attendees increasingly have included middle-class Peruvians and foreign tourists.

The culminating event for the indigenous non-Christian population takes place after the reappearance of Qullqa in the night sky; it is the rising of the sun after the full moon. Tens of thousands of people kneel to greet the first rays of light as the sun rises above the horizon. Until 2017, the main event for the Church was carried out by ukukus, who climbed glaciers over Qullqipunku at 5,522m.a.s.l. But due to the near disappearance of the glacier, there are fears that the ice may no longer be carried down. The ukukus are considered to be the only ones capable of dealing with the cursed souls said to inhabit the snowfields. The pilgrimage and associated festival was inscribed in 2011 on the UNESCO Intangible Cultural Heritage Lists.

==== Copacabana, Bolivia ====
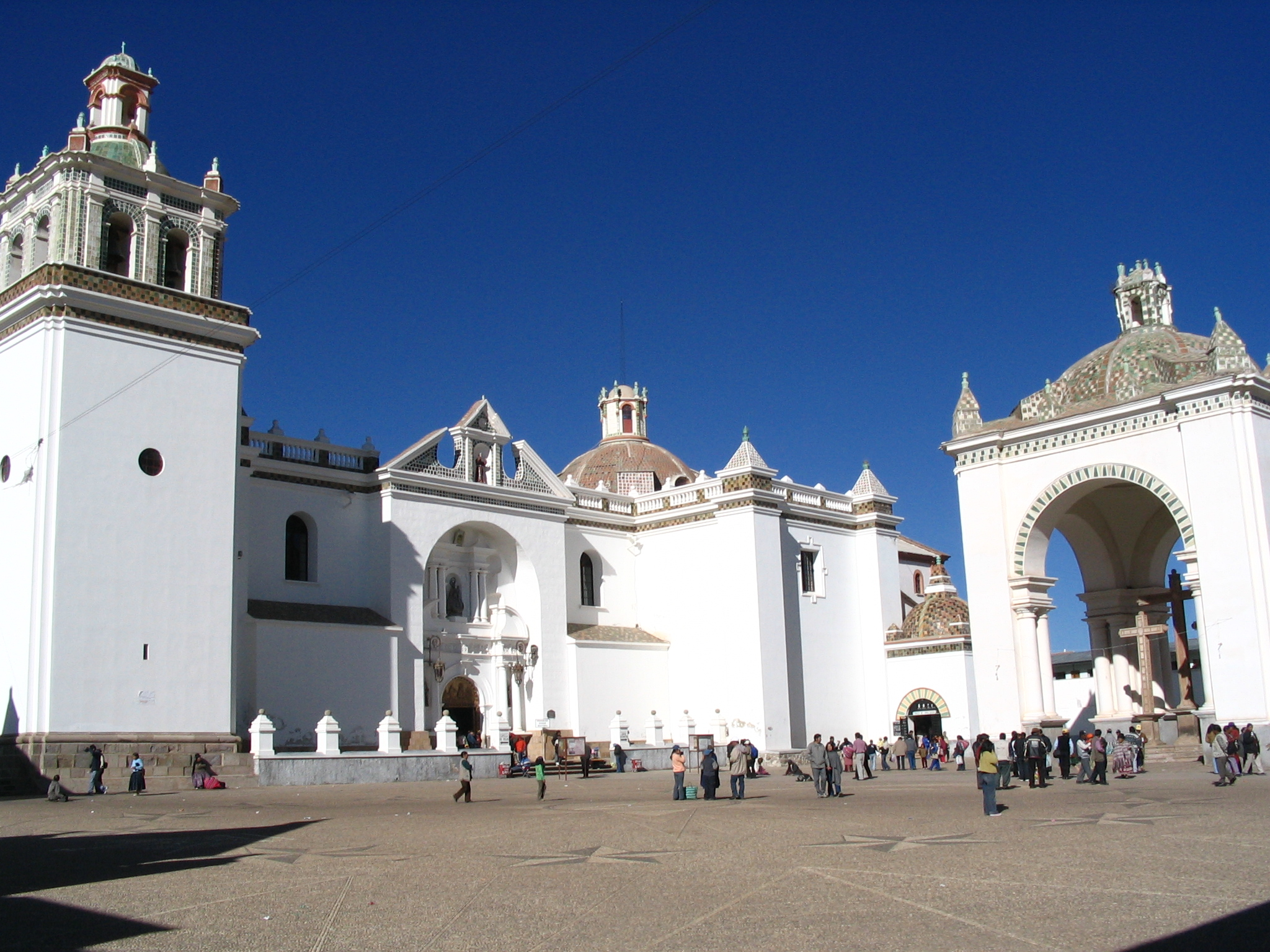
Copacabana's Basilica of Our Lady of Copacabana

Before 1534, Copacabana was an outpost of Inca occupation among dozens of other sites in Bolivia. The Incas held it as the key to the very ancient shrine and oracle on the Island of Titicaca, which they had adopted as a place of worship. In 1582, the grandson of Inca ruler Manco Kapac, struck by the sight of the statues of the Blessed Virgin which he saw in some of the churches at La Paz, tried to make one himself, and after many failures, succeeded in producing one of excellent quality, placing it in Copacabana as the statue of the tutelar protectress of the community.

During the Great Indigenous Uprising of 1781, while the church itself was desecrated, the "Camarin", as the chapel is called, remained untouched. Copacabana is the scene of often boisterous indigenous celebrations. The Urinsayas accepted the establishment of the Virgin Mary confraternity, but they did not accept Francisco Tito's carving, and decided to sell it. In La Paz, the picture reached the priest of Copacabana who decided he would bring the image to the people. On 2 February 1583, the image of the Virgin Mary was brought to the area. Since then, a series of miracles attributed to the icon made it one of the oldest Marian shrines in the Americas, On 2 February and 6 August, Church festivals are celebrated with indigenous dances.

==== Costa Rica ====
In Costa Rica, it is traditional to make a pilgrimage to Cartago on 2 August to make requests and give thanks to the Virgen de los Ángeles (the Lady of the Angels), nicknamed la Negrita due to the dark green color of the statue representing her; the statue located inside the Basilica of Our Lady of the Angels. People all over the country and even other Central American countries participate on foot or horseback. In 2009, due to AH1N1 spreading risks, it was officially cancelled, but the statue was taken on a tour to cities instead.

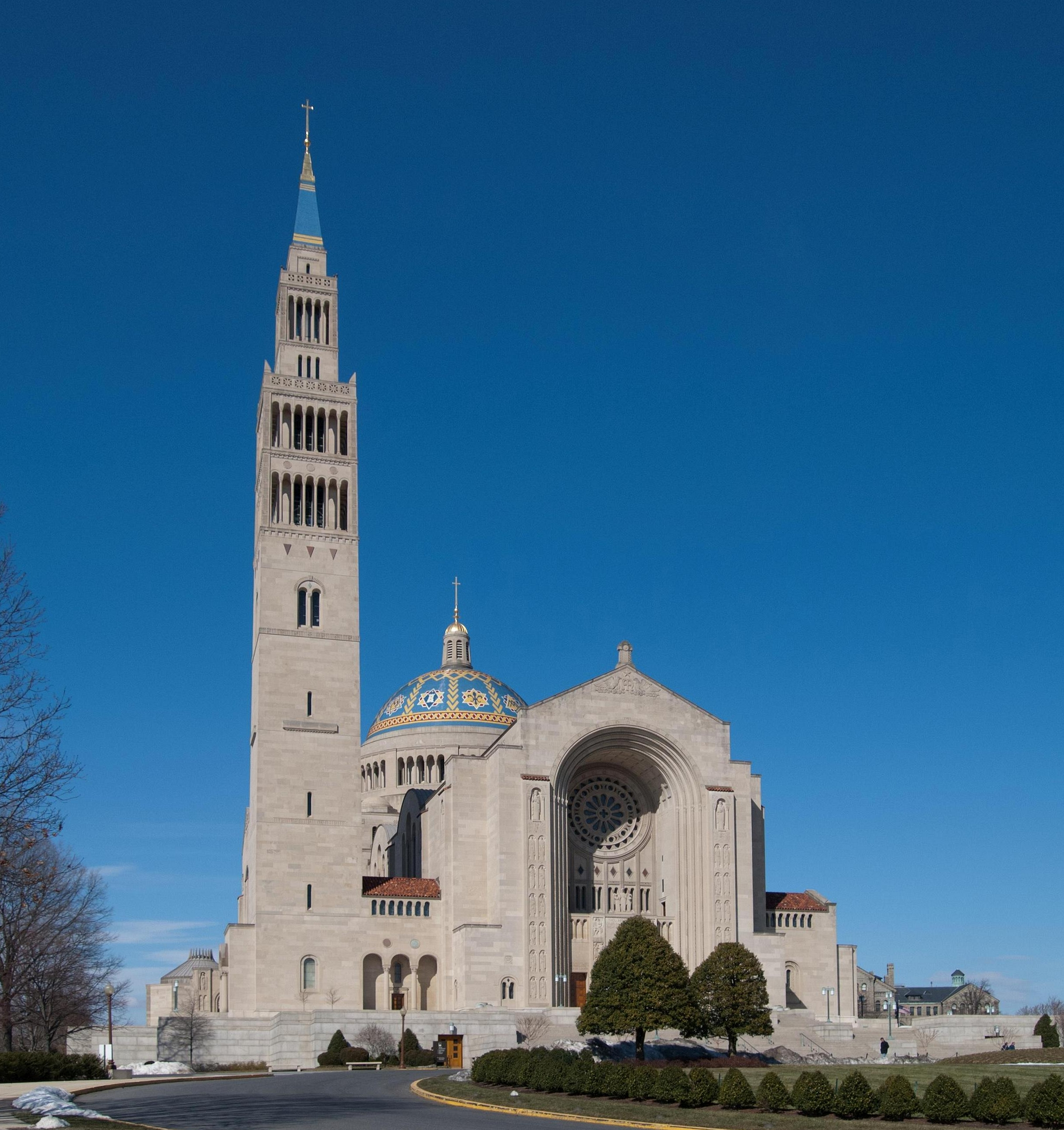
Basilica of the National Shrine of the Immaculate Conception, Washington

== See also ==
- Palestine Pilgrims' Text Society
- HCPT – The Pilgrimage Trust
- List of Christian pilgrimage sites
- Pilgrimage church
- The Path to Rome

== Sources ==
- Godfrey-Faussett, Thomas (1878), "Canterbury (1.)" , in Baynes, T. S. (ed.), Encyclopædia Britannica, vol. 5 (9th ed.), New York: Charles Scribner's Sons, pp. 28–30
- Lyle, Marjorie (2002), Canterbury: 2000 Years of History, Tempus, ISBN 978-0-7524-1948-0
- Ritter, Max (2019). Zwischen Glaube und Geld. Zur Ökonomie des byzantinischen Pilgerwesens (4.–12. Jh.) [Between faith and money. On the economy of Byzantine pilgrimage (4th-12th century)] (in German). Mainz: Verlag des RGZM. doi:10.11588/propylaeum.654. ISBN 978-3-88467-316-4.
