= Kent Archaeological Society =

British charitable organization

The Kent Archaeological Society was founded in 1857 to promote the study and publication of archaeology and history, specifically that pertaining to the ancient county of Kent in England. This includes the modern administrative county as well as areas now subsumed by south east London and in the district of Medway.

It carries out archaeological surveys and excavations funded through membership subscriptions as well as being involved in the protection and recording of historic buildings and churches. In addition, it organises lectures, excursions and other education projects and can make grants or loans of equipment to archaeological projects. A library in the museum at Maidstone is available for members' use and a field school, the Kent Archaeological Field School, is often run in the summer.

The society publishes an annual journal, Archaeologia Cantiana, and a quarterly newsletter. Through its Record Series, it publishes editions of archival texts relating to the county, and it therefore functions as the record society for Kent. It publishes other occasional volumes on specific topics.

Recent projects have included assisting in the excavation of the Ringlemere barrow and an edition and translation of the Kent Hundred Rolls. A number of local societies are affiliated to it and it has links with national and county archaeological organisations.

== Notable members ==
- John Brent, antiquarian and writer
- Leland Lewis Duncan, civil servant and antiquarian
- Thomas Godfrey Faussett, antiquarian
- Rev. Lambert Blackwell Larking, clergyman and antiquarian
- Francis Harry Panton, scientist and archaeologist
- George Pratt, 2nd Marquess Camden, politician
- Henry Brinsley Sheridan, politician
- Charles Roach Smith, antiquarian
- Flaxman Charles John Spurrell, archaeologist
