= Thomas Godfrey Faussett =

British antiquary (1829–1877)

Thomas Godfrey Faussett FSA (1829–1877), afterwards T. G. Godfrey-Faussett, was an English antiquary.

== Life ==
Faussett was born at Oxford in 1829, was a younger son of the Rev. Godfrey Faussett, D.D., canon of Christ Church, Oxford by his second wife, Sarah, daughter of Thomas Wethered of Marlow. When young he lived much at Worcester, where his father was then prebendary. He inherited the tastes of his great-grandfather, Bryan Faussett, the antiquary, and as a boy studied history and heraldry. He became scholar and fellow of Corpus Christi College, Oxford. In 1862 (or 1863) he was called to the bar, but did not practise. In 1866 he went to live at Canterbury, where he was in that year appointed auditor to the dean and chapter. He held the post until his death. In 1871 he was also appointed district registrar of the probate court at Canterbury. In March 1859 he had been elected fellow of the Society of Antiquaries.

From 1863 to 1873 he was honorary secretary of the Kent Archaeological Society. He published articles in its journal, Archæologia Cantiana, including "Canterbury till Domesday" (1861), and an account of an Anglo-Saxon cemetery opened by him at Patrixbourne (vol. 10). He wrote on the "Law of Treasure Trove" in vol. 22 of the Archaeological Journal. He specially studied the antiquities of Canterbury, and contributed the article on "Canterbury" to the Encyclopædia Britannica (9th edition). He also wrote a memoir of Bryan Faussett, printed in Charles Roach Smith's edition of the Inventorium Sepulchrale. Faussett succeeded Lambert Larking as editor of the large history of Kent begun by Thomas Streatfeild; but the ill-health from which he suffered from about 1866 till his death prevented his continuing the work. From about 1873 he was hardly ever able to hold a pen. In spite of this, Faussett, living in his pleasant house in the cathedral precincts, was a man of habitual cheerfulness, and composed hundreds of clever squibs and epigrams in Latin and English. Specimens of these and several of his graceful Latin hymns are printed in the Memorials of T. G. Faussett, published in 1878 (two editions) by the Rev. W. J. Loftie.

Faussett died at Canterbury 26 February 1877, and was buried in Nackington churchyard, near that city.

== Personal life ==
In 1864 Faussett married Lucy Jane Woodcock, daughter of Henry Woodcock of Bank House, near Wigan. The couple had an only child, Edward Godfrey (born 1868), who survived his father. In 1869, in common with other members of the family, Faussett took the surname of Godfrey-Faussett.
