= Leland Lewis Duncan =

Leland Lewis Duncan, MVO, OBE, FSA (24 August 1862 – 26 December 1923) was an English public servant, antiquary and author.

== Biography ==
Duncan was the eldest child and only son of Leland Crosthwait Duncan and Caroline Ellen Lewis. His father, a grandson of Leland Crosthwait, Governor General of the Bank of Ireland, had left Ireland for London in 1851 and after his marriage settled in Lewisham. The family lived at 1 Vicarage Terrace, High Road, Lewisham, where Leland Lewis Duncan was born. The family moved twice before they went to live at "Rosslair", 8 Lingards Road, Lewisham, England, in 1872. He can trace his roots to Strathblane, Stirlingshire, Scotland.

Duncan was born in Lewisham, where he lived throughout his life, was educated at Colfe's Grammar School, and began a career as a public servant.

His 40-year service with the War Office, beginning in 1882, was recognised with an O.B.E. as he rose in position. For his service in connection with the Coronation of King Edward VII and Queen Alexandra, he was invested as a Member (fourth class) of the Royal Victorian Order (MVO) two days after the ceremony, on 11 August 1902.

He became interested in archaeology early in his life, and began disposing of his spare time by copying wills at Somerset House. This collection of documents was largely ill-ordered and an untapped source of historical evidence. His work in this field led to his appointment as general editor on Challenor Smith's 1893 Index of Wills, published by the British Record Society. Duncan's transcription and editing of this material, which he carefully produced throughout his life, became an important resource to his contemporaries and later researchers. He made many field trips to note the deteriorating engravings amongst the memorials of churchyards, carefully recorded in an extensive set of notebooks. He was made a fellow of the Society of Antiquaries of London in 1890, contributed to the works of the St Paul's Ecclesiological Society and Lewisham Antiquarian Society, and was a life member of the Kent Archaeological Society (KAS).

He also assisted in the compilation or editing of several works, and the results of his research and fieldwork were published in the journals and transactions of several societies. His contributions to Archaeologia Cantiana began with a list of historical administrations of the Kent region. The society later published a special volume for his extracts from wills, Testamenta Cantiana, in 1906.

His few printed works include The Parish Church of St. Mary, Lewisham, and an account of its Vicars and Curates (1902); The History of the borough of Lewisham (1908); and The History of Colfe's Grammar School and a life of its founder (1910).

The journal Archaeologia Cantiana printed his papers 'The Renunciation of Papal Authority in West Kent, 1534', 'The Rectory of Cowden with a list of Rectors', 'The Will of Abp. Courtenay', 'Ecclesiological Notes on Shoreham', 'The Will of Cardinal Bourgehier', and 'Extracts from some lost Parish Registers'.

A major work was interrupted by his death, Kent Records – Index of Wills was completed and issued by the KAS in 1924 with a memoir of the author by F. W. Cock.

Duncan died on 26 December 1923, the year following his retirement, and was buried at Hither Green Cemetery in south London.
