= John Brent (antiquary) =

English antiquary, novelist, and poet

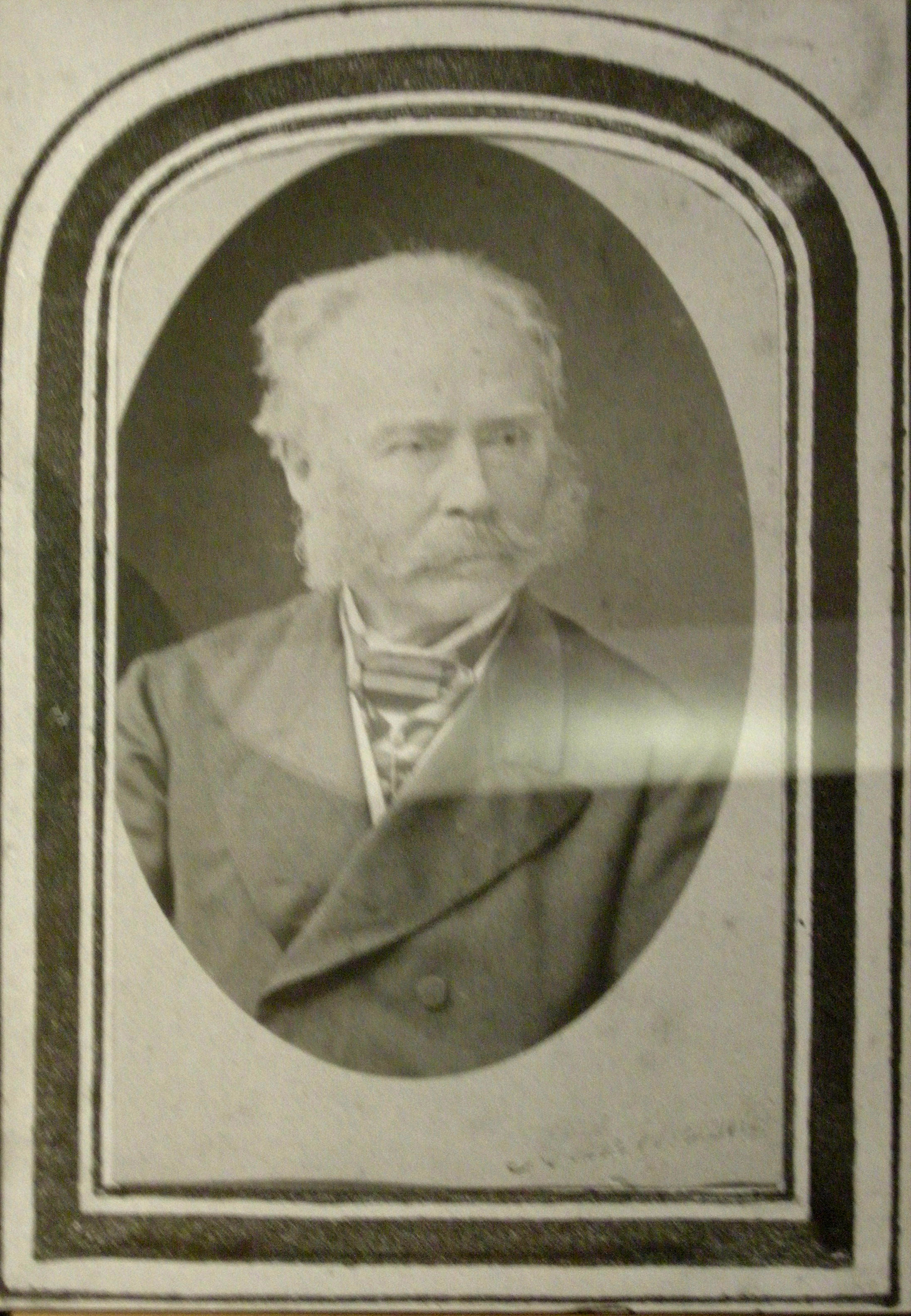
John Brent

John Brent (1808–1882) was an English antiquary, novelist, and poet.

== Biography ==
Brent was born in Rotherhithe, London on 21 August 1808, and was the eldest son of a father of the same name, a shipbuilder there, who about the year 1821 removed to Canterbury, and became thrice mayor of the city and deputy-lieutenant of the county. His mother was Susannah, third daughter of the Rev. Sampson Kingsford of Sturry, near Canterbury.

In his early days Brent carried on the business of a miller, occupied for many years a seat on the council of the Canterbury corporation, and was elected an alderman, but resigned that position on being appointed city treasurer.

During the course of a long life, Brent was indefatigable in his attempts to throw light on the history of the city and county in which he dwelt. He became a fellow of the Society of Antiquaries in April 1853, and was also a member of the British Archaeological Association and of the Kent Archaeological Society.

After the failure of the November Uprising (Polish–Russian War 1830–31), Brent became the local secretary of the Polish Association. He died at his house on the Dane John, Canterbury, 23 April 1882.

== Bibliography ==
=== Historical works ===
Brent's contributions to antiquarian literature are mostly to be found in the various publications of the societies to which he belonged. To the forty-first volume of the Archæologia (pp. 409–20) he communicated a paper of value to ethnological science, being an account of his "Researches in an Anglo-Saxon Cemetery at Stowting, in Kent, during the autumn of 1866".

In 1855 Brent had published a revised edition of Felix Summerly's Handbook for Canterbury, and in 1875 there appeared his Catalogue of the Antiquities in the Canterbury Museum, of which he was honorary curator. His work Canterbury in the Olden Time, 8vo, (enlarged edition in 1879), from its research and originality, bears testimony to his unwearied industry and his ability as an antiquarian topographer.

=== Poetry and novels ===
Brent also claims notice as a poet and novelist, having published:

1. The Sea Wolf, a Romance, 12mo, London, 1834
2. Lays of Poland, 12mo, London, 1836
3. Lays and Legends of Kent, 12mo, Canterbury, 1840; second edition, 1841
4. Guillemette La Delanasse, a poem, 12mo, Canterbury, 1840
5. The Battle Cross. A Romance of the Fourteenth Century, 3 vols 12mo, London, 1845
6. Ellie Forestere, a novel, 3 vols. 12mo, London, 1850
7. Sunbeams and Shadows, poems, printed for private circulation, 1853
8. Village Bells, Lady Gwendoline, and other Poems, 8vo London, 1865; second edition, 1868
9. Atalanta, Winnie, and other Poems, 12mo, London, 1873
10. Justine, a poem, 12mo, London, 1881. A collected edition of his poems was published in 2 vols. 8vo, London, 1884

Numerous tales, poems, and miscellaneous articles from his pen are also to be found in the various magazines devoted to light literature.
