= Lambert Blackwell Larking =

English clergyman, writer and antiquarian

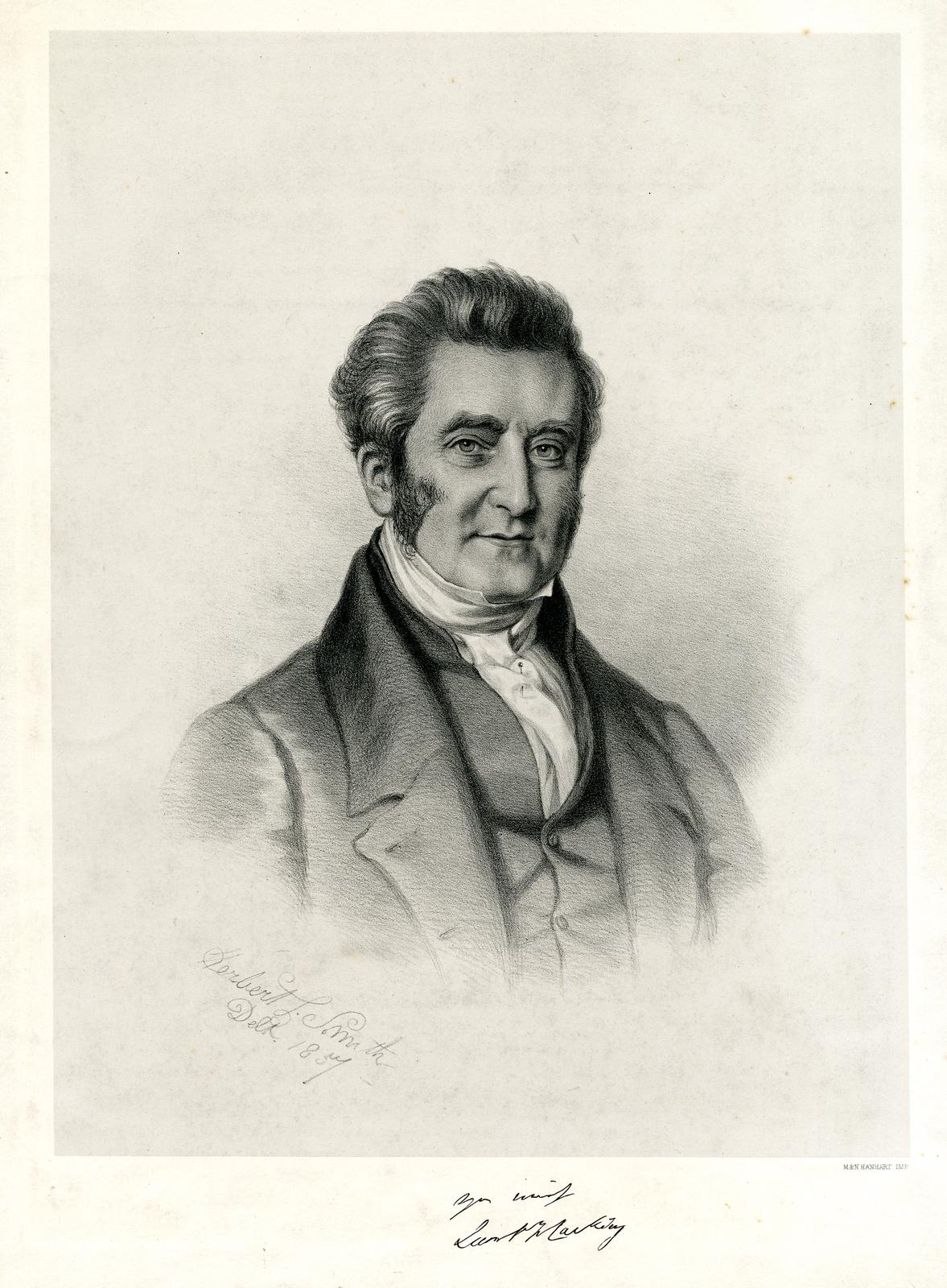
Lambert Blackwell Larking, 1857 engraving

Lambert Blackwell Larking (2 February 1797 – 2 August 1868) was an English clergyman, writer and antiquarian.

== Life ==
Larking was born in Clare House, East Malling, Kent, the eldest son of John Larking, High Sheriff of Kent, by Dorothy, daughter of Sir Charles Style, baronet (died 1774), of Wateringbury. He was educated at Eton and Brasenose College, Oxford. He was a Freemason, and whilst at Oxford he became one of the founders (in 1818) of the Apollo University Lodge. In 1830, aged 33, he became vicar of Ryarsh, near Maidstone.

== Writings ==
For many years Larking collaborated with the Revd Thomas Streatfeild (1777–1848), in the collection and compilation of materials for a new history of the county of Kent and, when Streatfeild died in 1848 the materials were left in Larking's hands. However, ill health constricted Larking to concentrating all his energy on his clerical duties, allowing him little time to devote to the project.

Nevertheless, Larking was able to complete another project very dear to him during his lifetime. A lithographic edition of the Kent section of Domesday Book, in facsimile, with transcription, translation, notes, and appendix by him, was completed shortly before his death, when it was in process of being printed. One year on, in 1869, the folio edition which he had planned appeared in print.

== Later life ==
Larking was a founder member of the Kent Archaeological Society in 1857, and served as its honorary secretary until 1860, when he was elected vice-president.

Larking died of ill health on 2 August 1868 at Ryarsh Vicarage.
