= Vaughan Thomas (antiquarian) =

English antiquarian

- Born: 1775
- Died: 26 October 1858 (aged 82–83); Oxford
- Occupation: Antiquarian

Vaughan Thomas (1775 – 26 October 1858) was an English antiquarian.

== Biography ==
Thomas was the son of John Thomas of Kingston, Surrey. Vaughan was born in 1775. He matriculated from Oriel College, Oxford, on 17 December 1792, and on 6 May 1794 was admitted a scholar of Corpus Christi College. He was afterwards elected to a fellowship, which he held till 1812. From Corpus he graduated B.A. in 1796, M.A. in 1800, and B.D. in 1809. On 12 February 1803, he became vicar of Yarnton in Oxfordshire; on 11 June 1804 he was appointed vicar of Stoneleigh in Warwickshire, and on 25 March 1811 he received the rectory of Duntisborne Rouse in Gloucestershire. These three livings he held during the remainder of his life. He died at Oxford on 26 October 1858, leaving a widow, but no children.

Thomas was a voluminous author. His most important work was ‘The Italian Biography of Sir Robert Dudley, Knight,’ Oxford, 1861, 8vo, for which he began to collect materials in 1806. Among his other writings may be mentioned: 1. ‘A Sermon on the Impropriety of conceding the Name of Catholic to the Church of Rome,’ Oxford, 1816, 8vo; 2nd edit. 1838. 2. ‘The Legality of the present Academical System of the University of Oxford asserted,’ Oxford, 1831, 8vo; 2nd part, 1832; 2nd edit. 1853 (Edinburgh Review, liii. 384, liv. 478). 3. ‘The universal Profitableness of Scripture for Doctrine,’ Oxford, 1836, 8vo. 4. ‘On the Authenticity of the Designs of Raffaelle and Michael Angelo,’ Oxford, 1842, 8vo. 5. ‘Thoughts on the Cameos and Intaglios of Antiquity,’ Oxford, 1847, 8vo. 6. ‘Account of the March of King Charles the First from Oxford,’ Oxford, 1850, 8vo. 7. ‘Christian Philanthropy exemplified in a Memoir of the Rev. Samuel Wilson Warneford [q. v.] ’, Oxford, 1855, 8vo.
