= Transatlantic crossing =

Passages of passengers and cargo across the Atlantic Ocean

Transatlantic crossings are passages of passengers and cargo across the Atlantic Ocean between Europe or Africa and the Americas. The majority of passenger traffic is across the North Atlantic between Western Europe and North America. Centuries after the dwindling of sporadic Viking trade with Markland, a regular and lasting transatlantic trade route was established in 1566 with the Spanish West Indies fleets, following the voyages of Christopher Columbus.

== By sea ==
Prior to the development of the steamship in the 19th century, transatlantic crossings were undertaken in sailing ships, and the journeys were time-consuming and often perilous. The first trade route across the Atlantic was inaugurated by Spain a few decades after the European Voyages to the Americas, with the establishment of the West Indies fleets in 1566, a convoy system that regularly linked its territories in the Americas with Spain for over two centuries. Portugal created a similar maritime route between its ports in Brazil and the Portuguese mainland. Other colonial powers followed, such as Britain, France and the Netherlands, as they colonized the New World.

In the middle of the 19th century, primarily American and British businessmen developed a lucrative trade in transatlantic human freight in the wake of the mass emigration of the people of Ireland during the Great Famine.

Guinness Book of World Records has awarded world records to vessels of various classes such as luxury liners, sail boats, and rowing boats. Because of the shape of the continents and the assistance (or resistance) of ocean currents, the Eastbound crossing is quicker than the Westbound crossing.

=== Passenger liners ===
Transatlantic passenger crossings became faster, safer, and more reliable with the advent of steamships in the 19th century. The wooden-hulled, paddle-wheel SS Great Western built in 1838 is recognized as the first purpose-built transatlantic steamship, on a scheduled run back and forth from Bristol to New York City. The design by British civil engineer Isambard Kingdom Brunel was a breakthrough in its size, unprecedented passenger capacity, and for Brunel leveraging the fuel efficiency of a larger ship. It became the prototype for a generation of similar ships.

The British & North American Royal Mail Steam Packet Company started its year-round Liverpool-Halifax-Boston service in 1840, using four new Britannia-class steamships and a mail contract from the British government. The company later evolved into the Cunard Line, with Cunard's dominance drawing the attention of the U.S. government, which had its own mail contract to offer to an American firm willing to compete. In 1850, the contract was awarded to the New York and Liverpool United States Steamship Company, which became the Collins Line, and which answered Cunard with its own four ships, which were newer, larger, faster, and more luxurious.

Competition developed among the industrial powers of the time—the United Kingdom, France, Germany, Italy, and the United States—to competitively build grand ocean liners as symbols of national technical skill and expressions of power, not just transport businesses. The competition was for speed. An award called the Blue Riband has been tracked since 1838, for the fastest average speed of a steamship in regular service across the Atlantic. This record became so critical to international prestige that the RMS Mauretania was commissioned by the British government specifically to take the Blue Riband back from the Germans and their SS Kaiser Wilhelm der Grosse, which it did in 1907. The government also required it be convertible into a troop carrier if needed. In 1935, shipping magnate Harold Hales formalized the prize by commissioning and donating the four-foot, solid silver Hales Trophy.

Examples of other famous transatlantic liners are RMS Lusitania, RMS Olympic, RMS Titanic, SS Île de France,RMS Aquitania, SS Rex, SS Normandie, RMS Queen Mary, SS America, RMS Queen Elizabeth, SS France, Queen Elizabeth 2, RMS Queen Mary 2, and the SS United States. The United States is the current holder of the Hales Trophy. In July 1952, that ship made the crossing in 3 days, 10 hours, 40 minutes. Cunard Line's RMS Queen Mary 2 is the only ship currently making regular transatlantic crossings throughout the year, usually between Southampton and New York. For this reason it has been designed as a proper ocean liner, not as a cruise ship.

During World War II, the transatlantic crossing was very important for the United Kingdom as much of Europe had been taken over by Germany and its allies preventing trade and supplies; the struggle is known as the Battle of the Atlantic.

=== Smallest powerboat to cross the Atlantic ===
In 2009, two brothers, Ralph and Robert Brown, crossed the Atlantic Ocean in a 21 ft (6.4 m) flats boat – a special boat designed to operate in extremely shallow water. This flats boat was designed and built by Ralph Brown. The voyage was called the "I Am Second Wounded Hero Voyage" in honor of the men who were killed in Operation Eagle Claw; Ralph Brown had been in the USMC at the time of the Operation and was told he was going to participate in the mission. Though he ultimately did not go, other servicemen who did perished in the failed military operation.

==== Inflatable boat ====
In 1952, Alain Bombard crossed the Atlantic from East to West, journeying 113 days in a Zodiac, L'Hérétique.

==== Rafts ====
In 1956, Henri Beaudout crossed the Atlantic from West to East, from Halifax to Falmouth, on a raft of wood and rope, L'Égaré II, in 88 days.

In 1970, Thor Heyerdahl crossed the Atlantic in Ra II, a papyrus raft built to an Ancient Egyptian design. This voyage followed an unsuccessful attempt the previous year in his first raft, Ra I.

In 1988, the junk raft, Son of Town Hall, crossed the North Atlantic Ocean.

In 2011, Anthony Smith and the Antiki crossed the Atlantic.

==== By oar ====
On July 10, 1980, Gérard d'Aboville became the first sailor to row solo across the Atlantic Ocean in a west-east direction.

On 13 June 2003, French rower Maud Fontenoy started an eastward crossing of the Atlantic from Saint-Pierre-et-Miquelon. She reached A Coruña in Spain on 10 October, becoming the first woman to accomplish this feat.

In 2005, the Vivaldi Atlantic 4 broke the previous rowing record of 55 days and setting a new record of 39 days.

On 26 October 2010, Polish sexagenarian Aleksander Doba was the first recorded individual to complete a non-stop transatlantic crossing by kayak. He departed Dakar, Senegal and arrived in Brazil 99 days later.

===== Transatlantic rowing races =====
In 1997, the first East–West Atlantic Rowing Race took place, running from the Canary Islands to the Caribbean. It now runs roughly once every two years.

In 2006, the first West–East North Atlantic Rowing Race took place, running from New York City to Falmouth, Cornwall in the UK.

===== Sail =====
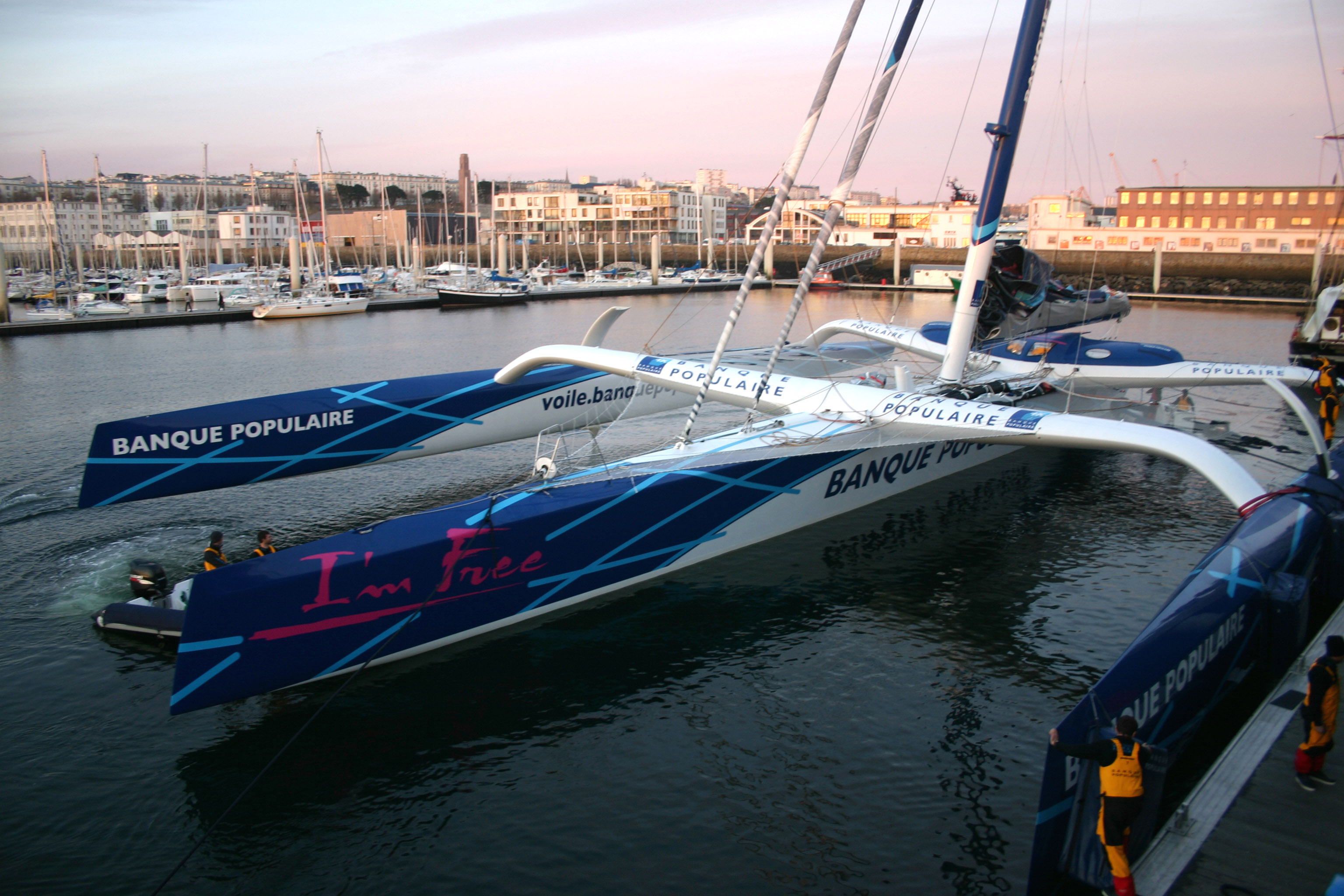
Banque Populaire V, current record holder

In 1775, the 62-ton schooner Quero, under the command of John Derby, sailed from Salem, Massachusetts to the Isle of Wight in 28 days (April 28 to May 25).

In 1866, the 26-foot (7.9 m) lifeboat Red, White and Blue sailed from New York City to Margate, England, in 38 days. In 1870 and 1871, The 20-foot (6.1 m) yawl City of Ragusa sailed from Queenstown, Ireland, to New York and back, crewed by two men (and a dog) each way.

== Transatlantic flights ==
Transatlantic flight surpassed ocean liners as the predominant mode of crossing the Atlantic in the mid 20th century. In 1919, the American NC-4 became the first airplane to cross the Atlantic (but in multiple stages). Later that year, a British Vickers Vimy piloted by Alcock and Brown made the first non-stop transatlantic flight from Newfoundland to Ireland. Also in 1919, the British were the first to cross the Atlantic in an airship when the R34 captained by Major George Herbert Scott of the Royal Air Force with his crew and passengers flew from East Fortune, Scotland to Mineola, Long Island, covering a distance of about 3,000 statute miles (4,800 km) in about four and a half days; he then made a return trip to England, thus also completing the first double crossing of the Atlantic (east–west–east).

The first aerial crossing of the South Atlantic was made by the Portuguese naval aviators Gago Coutinho and Sacadura Cabral in 1922. Coutinho and Cabral flew from Lisbon, Portugal, to Rio de Janeiro, Brazil in stages, using three different Fairey III biplanes, and they covered a distance of 8,383 kilometres (5,209 mi) between 30 March and 17 June. The first night-time crossing of the Atlantic was accomplished during 16–17 April 1927 by the Portuguese aviators Sarmento de Beires, Jorge de Castilho and Manuel Gouveia, flying from the Bijagós Archipelago, Portuguese Guinea, to Fernando de Noronha, Brazil in the Argos, a Dornier Wal flying boat. In May 1927, Charles Lindbergh made the first solo non-stop transatlantic flight in an airplane (between New York City and Paris). The second solo piloting, and the first to carry a passenger, was Clarence Duncan Chamberlin on 6 June 1927. Edward R. Armstrong proposed a string of anchored "seadromes" to refuel planes in a crossing.

The first serious attempt to take a share of the transatlantic passenger market away from the ocean liners was undertaken by Germany. In the 1930s, Germany crossed the Atlantic with Zeppelins that could carry about 60 passengers in a similar luxurious style to the ocean liners. However, the Hindenburg disaster in 1937 put an end to transatlantic Zeppelin flights.

On 1 June 1944, two K-class blimps from Blimp Squadron ZP-14 of the United States Navy (USN) completed the first transatlantic crossing by non-rigid airships. The two K-ships (K-123 and K-130) left South Weymouth, MA on 28 May 1944 and flew approximately 16 hours to Naval Station Argentia, Newfoundland. From Argentia, the blimps flew approximately 22 hours to Lajes Field on Terceira Island in the Azores. The final leg of the first transatlantic crossing was about a 20-hour flight from the Azores to Craw Field in Port Lyautey (Kenitra), French Morocco.

Beginning in the 1950s, the predominance of ocean liners began to wane when larger, jet-powered airplanes began carrying passengers across the ocean in less and less time. The speed of crossing the ocean therefore became more important than the style of crossing it. The maturing passenger Jet Age starting with the Boeing 707 reduced the typical crossing time between London and New York City to between 6.5 and 8 hours, depending on weather conditions. By the 1970s, supersonic Concorde airplanes could connect the two cities in less than 4 hours, and only one ocean liner, Queen Elizabeth 2 remained on the transatlantic route for those who favored the slower style of travel.

The economics of commercial transatlantic flying have evolved markedly since the 1950s; the introduction of widebody airliners (such as the Boeing 747 and Douglas DC-10) in the early 1970s made affordable transatlantic travel to the masses a reality. Since the 1990s, the high reliability of modern jet engines has meant that twin-engine jet aircraft such as the Boeing 767, Boeing 777 and Airbus A330 have largely taken over on transatlantic routes from quad-engine jets, whilst the supersonic Concorde was ultimately doomed by its high running costs, leading to its retirement in 2003. Since the late 1990s, twin-engined, narrow-body jet airliners have been used for transatlantic service, meaning that city pairs between major North American hubs and secondary European cities can now be connected directly without the need for larger widebody jets, which were uneconomic on routes with lower passenger demand. The Boeing 757 started this trend when it became ETOPS certified, although the most recent versions of both the Boeing 737 and Airbus A320 now have transatlantic capability.

== Transatlantic cables ==
Transatlantic cables are cables that have been laid along the ocean floor to connect North America and Europe. Before the advent of radio, the only means of communication across the Atlantic Ocean was to physically connect the continents with a transatlantic telegraph cable, the first of which was installed from Valentia, Ireland to Heart's Content, Newfoundland in 1858. It worked for a month.

The first pair of eastbound and westbound transatlantic telephone cables, TAT-1, were laid in 1955 and 1956 by the cable ship HMTS Monarch. The first transatlantic fiber optic cable, TAT-8, was installed in 1988.

The exchange rate between the United States dollar and British pound is still colloquially known as "cable" by financial marketeers, from the early use of the transatlantic cable for this purpose.

== Transatlantic tunnel ==
A transatlantic tunnel is a theoretical structure proposed several times since the late 19th century. It would be a tunnel spanning the Atlantic Ocean between New York City and the United Kingdom or France.

== Duration of transatlantic crossings ==
The introduction of various technologies facilitated progressively faster transatlantic crossings. The duration to travel westbound from Europe to North America when a new transport innovation was introduced for commercial use is listed below:

- 1620: 66 days: fluyt Mayflower (Southampton to Cape Cod)
- 1838: 18 days 4 hours: paddle steamer SS Sirius (Cork to New York City)
- 1863: 8 days 3 hours: single screw steamship RMS Scotia (Queenstown to New York City)
- 1889: 5 days 19 hours: double screw steamship SS City of Paris (Queenstown to Sandy Hook)
- 1907: 4 days 20 hours: steam turbine-equipped steamship: RMS Lusitania (Queenstown to Sandy Hook)
- 1929: 4 days 3 hours: bulbous bow-equipped steamship: SS Bremen (Cherbourg to Ambrose Light)
- 1936: 4 days: Yarrow boiler-equipped steamship: RMS Queen Mary (Bishop Rock to Ambrose Light)
- 1936: 2 days 5 hours: airship LZ 129 Hindenburg (Frankfurt to Lakehurst)
- 1939: 1 day 3 hours: flying boat Pan Am Boeing 314 Clipper Yankee Clipper (Southampton to Port Washington via Foynes, Botwood and Shediac)
- 1945: 14 hours: landplane American Overseas Airlines Douglas DC-4 (London to New York City via Gander, Newfoundland)
- 1958: 10 hours 20 minutes: jet aircraft BOAC de Havilland Comet (London to New York City via Gander)
- 1976: 3 hours 30 minutes: supersonic aircraft British Airways Concorde (London to Washington, D.C.)

== See also ==
- Transatlantic relations
- Transpacific crossing
- Transpacific flight
- Atlantic slave trade
