= Neutrino (disambiguation) =

A neutrino is an elementary particle.

Neutrino may also refer to:

- QNX Neutrino, an operating system
- Team Neutrino, a FIRST Championship team
- Neutrino (village), or Neytrino (Russian: Нейтрино), a village near Baksan Neutrino Observatory in Elbrussky District of Kabardino-Balkar Republic, Russia

== Fiction ==
- Neutrinos (Teenage Mutant Ninja Turtles), characters in the TV show
- Neutrino 2000, a series of guns used in the Artemis Fowl books

== See also ==
- Neutrino Factory, a proposed particle accelerator complex
- Poppa Neutrino, born William David Pearlman (1933–2011), musician and "free spirit"
- Oxide & Neutrino, a UK garage/rap duo
- Neutralino, a hypothetical particle
