= World Museum =

Natural and physical science museum in Liverpool, England

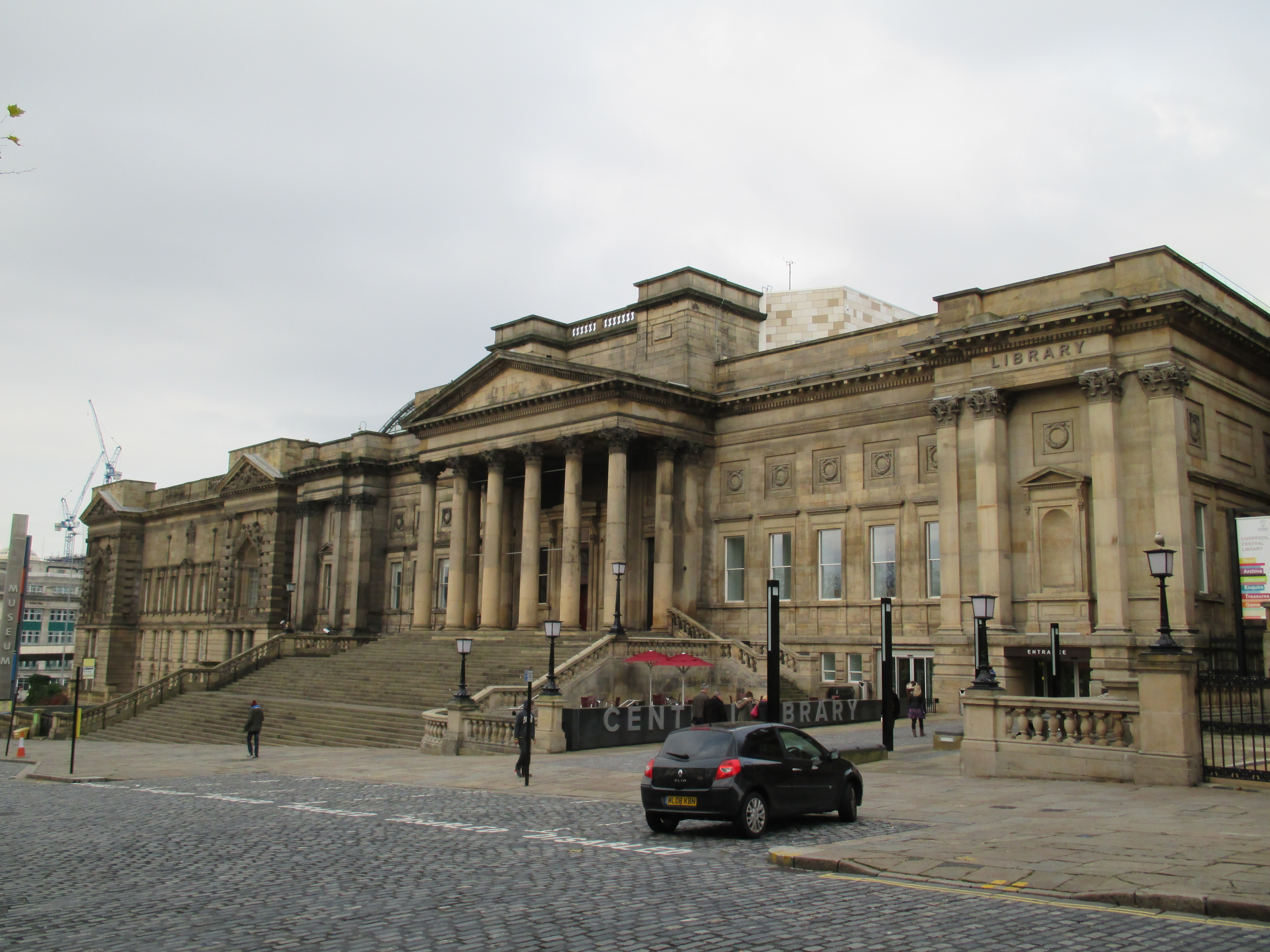
- World Museum, with the entrance to Liverpool Central Library on the right
- Former name: Derby Museum; Liverpool Museum
- Established: 1851
- Location: William Brown Street, Liverpool, England, United Kingdom
- Coordinates: 53°24′36″N 02°58′54″W
- Visitors: 676,984 (2026)
- Director: Laura Pye
- Website: www.liverpoolmuseums.org.uk

World Museum is a large museum in Liverpool, England which has extensive collections covering archaeology, ethnology and the natural and physical sciences. Special attractions include the Natural History Centre and a planetarium. Entry to the museum is free. The museum is part of National Museums Liverpool.

== History ==
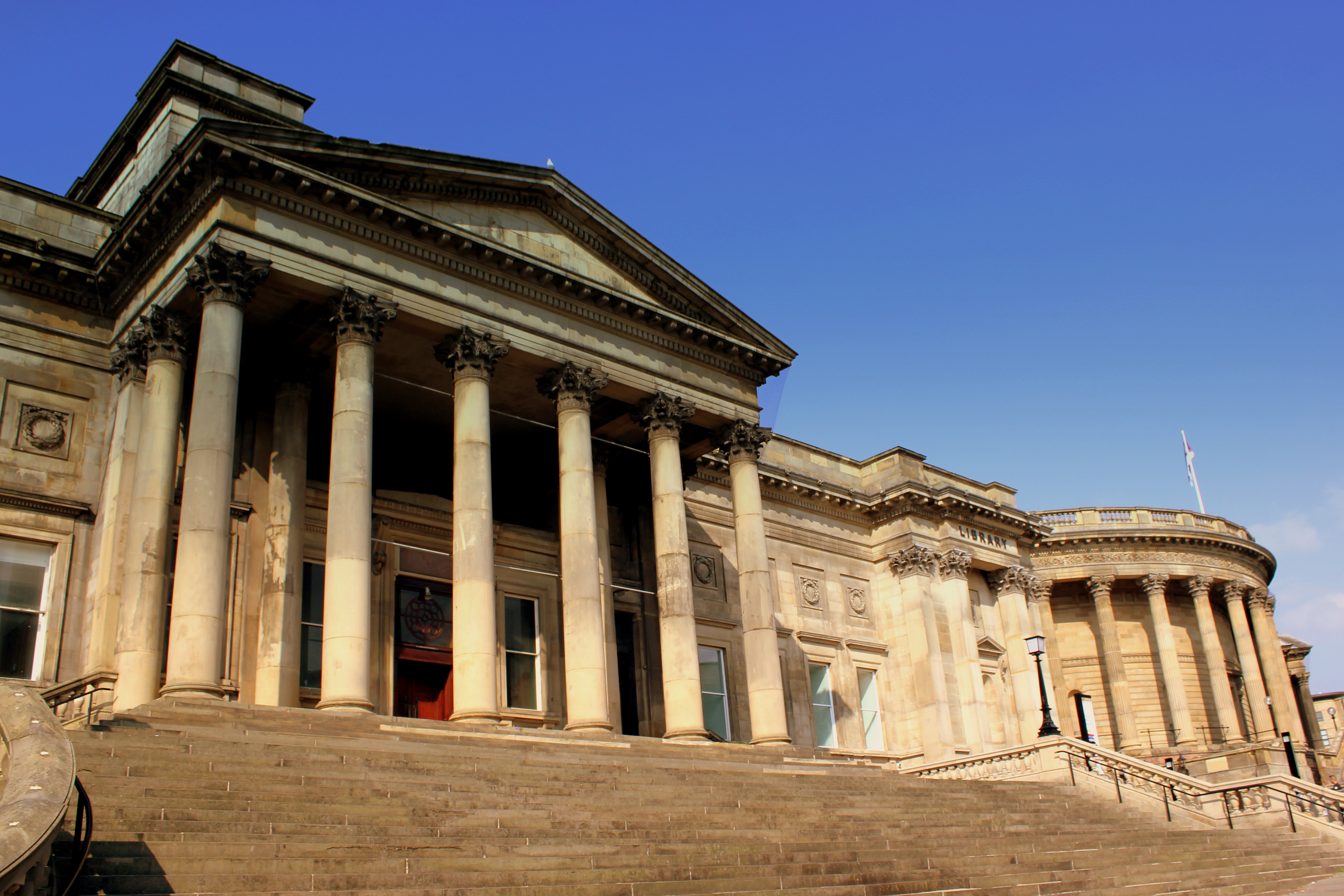
Original entrance steps to World Museum with Liverpool Central Library on the right

The current museum is unconnected to the Liverpool Museum of William Bullock, who operated a museum in his house on Church Street, Liverpool, between 1795 and 1809, before he moved it to London.

The museum was originally started as the Derby Museum as it comprised the 13th Earl of Derby's natural history collection. It opened in 1851, sharing two rooms on Duke Street with a library. However, the museum proved extremely popular and a new, purpose-built building was required.

Land for the new building, on a street then known as Shaw's Brow (now William Brown Street), opposite St George's Hall, was donated by a local MP and wealthy merchant, Sir William Brown, as was much of the funding for the building which would be known as the William Brown Library and Museum. Around 400,000 people attended the opening of the new building in 1860.

Reports detailing the museum's activities and acquisitions were presented to the committee of the borough, city and corporation of Liverpool annually.

In the late 19th century, the museum's collection was beginning to outgrow its building so a competition was launched to design a combined extension to the museum and college of technology. The competition was won by Edward William Mountford and the College of Technology and Museum Extension opened in 1901.

Liverpool, being one of the UK's major ports, was heavily damaged by German bombing during the blitz. While much of the museum's collection was moved to less vulnerable locations during the war, the museum building was struck by German firebombs and suffered heavy damage. Parts of the museum only began to reopen fifteen years later. One of the exhibits destroyed in 1941 was the little 20 ft (6.1 m) yawl City of Ragusa, which twice crossed the Atlantic in 1870 and 1871 with a crew of two men.

The museum underwent a £35 million refurbishment in 2005 in order to double the size of the display spaces and make more of the collections accessible for visitors. A central entrance hall and six-storey atrium were created as part of the work. Major new galleries included "World Cultures", the "Bug House" and the "Weston Discovery Centre". On reopening the museum's name was changed again to World Museum.

== Collections and exhibits ==
=== Astronomy, space and time ===
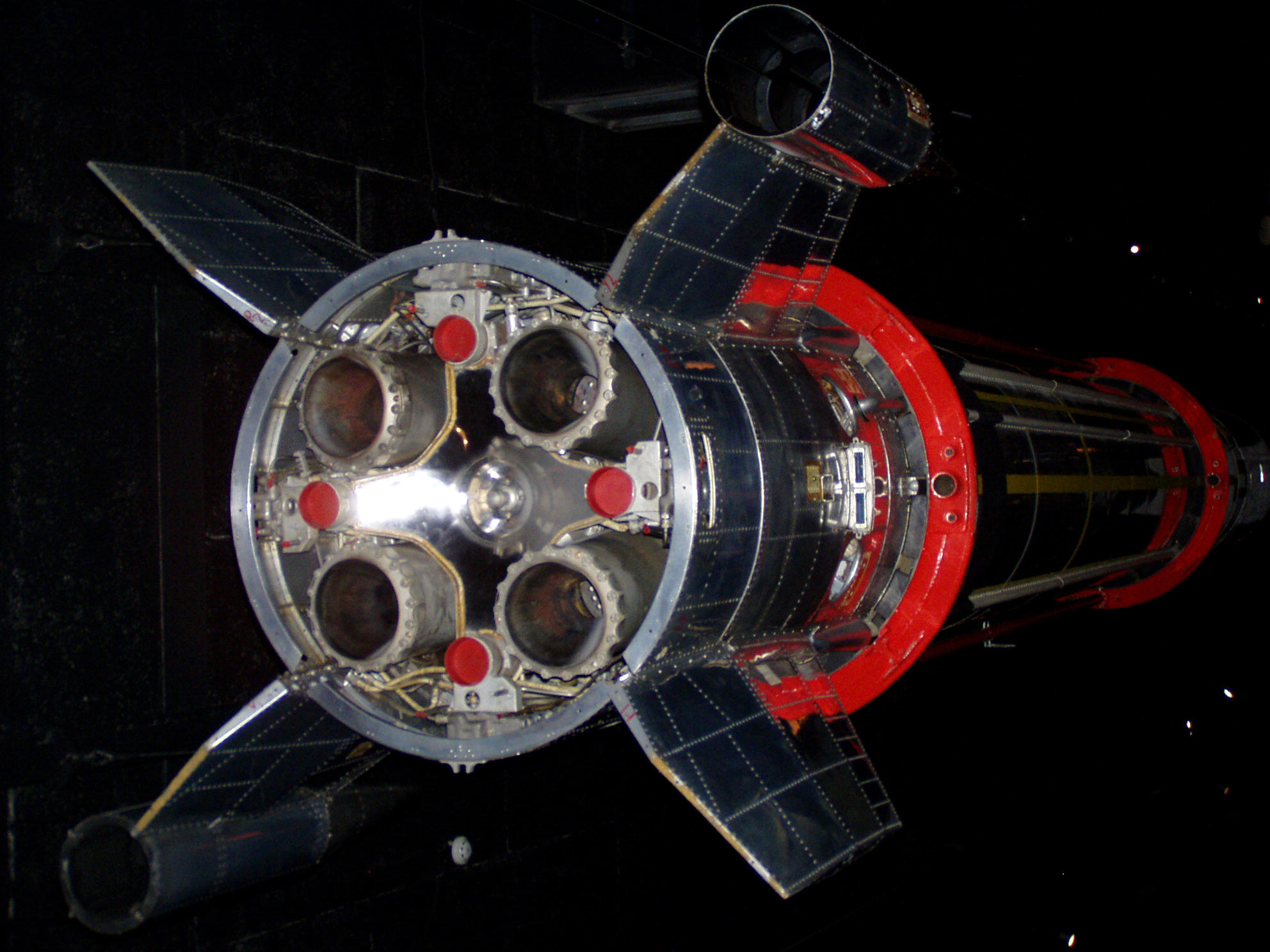
The Black Knight BK02, a ballistic missile, is located in the Space and Time wing of the museum

The physical sciences collection of World Museum was built after the devastation caused by the incendiary fire of 1941. The collection has expanded, in part, due to transfers from the Decorative Arts Department, Regional History Department, Walker Art Gallery and the Prescot Museum. The collection also contains several significant collections from the Liverpool Royal Institution, Bidston Observatory, later the Proudman Institute of Oceanographic Sciences, and the Physics Department of the University of Liverpool.

Collections such as these are often made up of items of a singular type designed for a particular experiment such as DELPHI or LEP at CERN or the Equatorium, a post-Copernican planetary calculator made to special order in the early 17th century. As a consequence the collection is small but contains a number of significant items.

==== Planetarium ====
World Museum is home to a planetarium. The planetarium, said to be the first planetarium in the UK outside of London, opened in 1970 and has 62 seats. It currently attracts about 90,000 people per year. Shows cover various aspects of space science, including the Solar System and space exploration; there are also special children's shows.

=== Human history ===
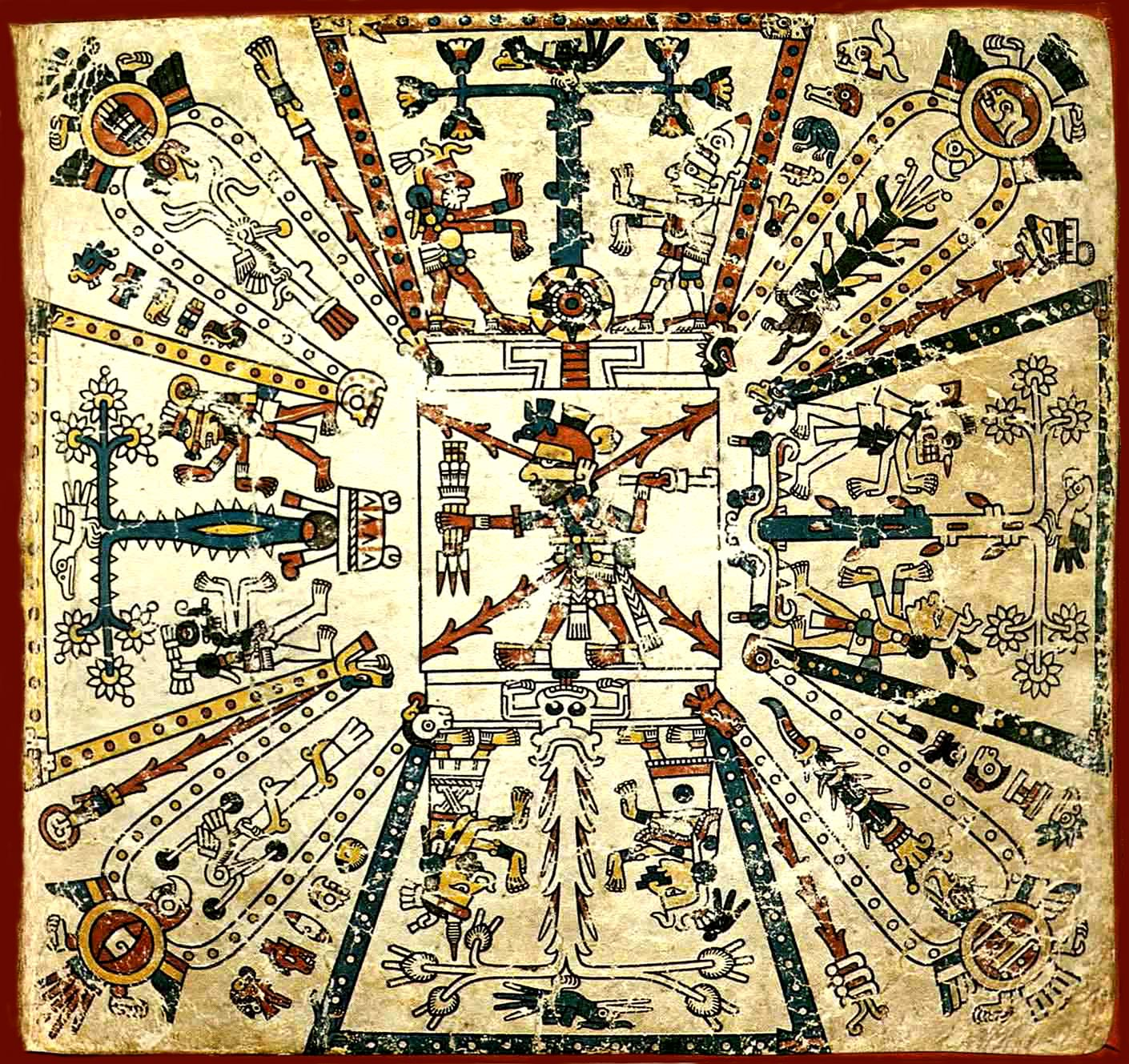
The Codex Fejérváry-Mayer which is located in the museum is an Aztec Codex and one of the few manuscripts to have survived the Spanish conquest of Mexico

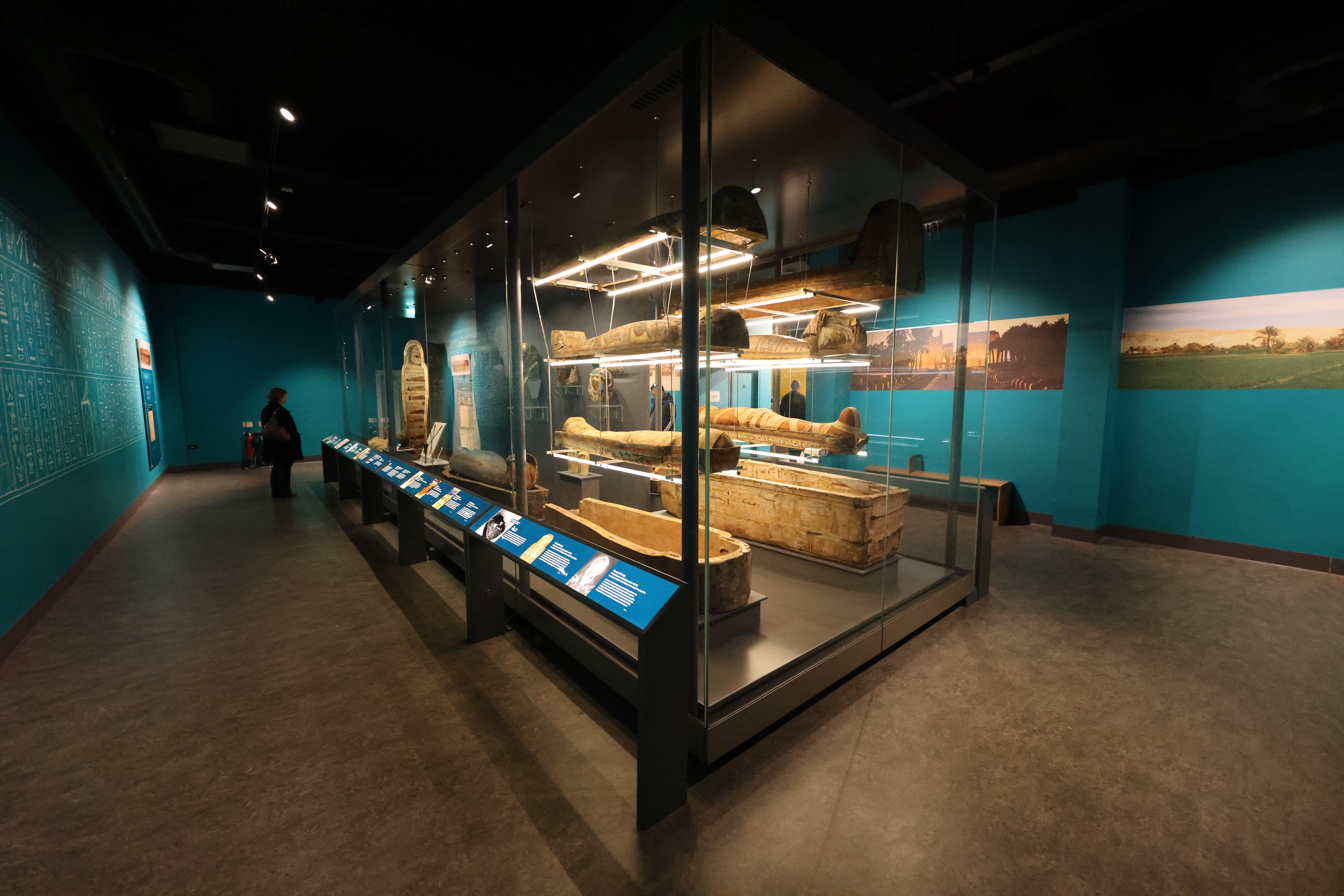
The Mummy room

==== Archaeology and Egyptology ====
The archaeological collection includes many fine British objects, including the Anglo-Saxon Kingston brooch and Liudhard medalet, with other objects from the Canterbury-St Martin's hoard.

The Egyptian antiquities collection contains approximately 15,000 objects from Egypt and Sudan and is the most important single component of the Antiquities department's collections. The chronological range of the collection spans from the Prehistoric to the Islamic Period with the largest archaeological site collections being Abydos, Amarna, Beni Hasan, Esna and Meroe.

Over 5,000 Egyptian antiquities were donated to the museum in 1867 by Joseph Mayer (1803–1886), a local goldsmith and antiquarian. Mayer purchased collections from Joseph Sams of Darlington (which contained material from the Henry Salt sale in 1835), Lord Valentia, Bram Hertz, the Reverend Henry Stobart, and the heirs of the Rev. Bryan Faussett. Mayer had displayed his collection in his own ‘Egyptian Museum’ in Liverpool with a purpose of giving citizens who were unable to visit the British Museum in London some idea of the achievements of the Egyptian civilization. On the strength of this substantial donation other people began to donate Egyptian material to the museum, and by the later years of the 19th century the museum had a substantial collection that Amelia Edwards described as being the most important collection of Egyptian antiquities in England next to the contents of the British Museum.

The quality of the Mayer donation is high and there are some outstanding items, but with a few exceptions the entire collection is unprovenanced. The collection was systematically enhanced through subscription to excavations in Egypt. Altogether the museum subscribed to 25 excavations carried out by the Egypt Exploration Fund (now Egypt Exploration Society), the British School of Archaeology in Egypt, and the Egyptian Research Account between 1884 and 1914. It was further developed through links with the Institute of Archaeology at Liverpool University and important collections came to the museum from the excavations of John Garstang who was honorary reader in Egyptian archaeology at Liverpool University, 1902–1907, and Professor of Methods and Practice of Archaeology, 1907–1941. The museum has always had a close relationship with the university; in the early 1920s Percy Newberry, Brunner Professor of Egyptology, and his successor T. Eric Peet, catalogued the collection, assisted with the rearrangement of the displays, and produced a handbook and guide to the Egyptian collection (1st ed., 1923).

In May 1941, at the height of the Liverpool Blitz, a bomb fell on the museum, which was burnt to a shell. Large parts of the collection had been removed at the outbreak of the war, but much remained on display or in store and many artefacts were destroyed. What remained was quite inaccessible and it was not until 1976 that a permanent Egypt gallery was opened in the rebuilt museum. Following the war the museum actively augmented the collection through collecting of new material from excavations in Egypt and Sudan and the purchase of other museum collections. In 1947 and 1949 the material from Garstang's excavations at Meroe came to the museum, and in 1955 Liverpool University placed substantial amounts from its own collections within the museum, including many items from Beni Hasan and Abydos. In 1956 the museum purchased almost the entire non-British collections of the Norwich Castle Museum. This included EES excavated material from Amarna and other sites, botanical remains from Kahun and the private collection of Sir Henry Rider Haggard. In 1973 the collection was increased further by the acquisition of part of the Sir Henry Wellcome Collection, and by the bequest of Colonel J. R. Danson in 1976, which included more material from Amarna and from Garstang's excavations at Abydos.

Postwar a limited Egyptian gallery was opened in 1976 before being expanded in 2008. The gallery between September 2015 and April 2017 to allow it to be improved and expanded.

A handy lavishly illustrated guide to the collection is available: Gifts of the Nile (London: HMSO, 1995).

==== Ethnology ====
The ethnology collection at World Museum ranks among the top six collections in the country. The four main areas represented are: Africa, the Americas, Oceania and Asia. A late addition to the Japanese collections is the netsuke collection from the Swedish businessman Jonas Goro Gadelius. The exhibition includes interactive displays.

=== Natural history ===
In the Natural World area can be seen a range of exhibits, including live colonies of insects and historic zoological and botanical exhibits. Visitors can examine the collections up close in the award-winning Clore Natural History Centre, where there are interactive displays.

World Museum's natural history collection is divided into the Botany, Entomology and other Invertebrates, Geology and Vertebrate Zoology collections.

==== Vertebrate zoology ====
The 13th Earl of Derby founded the original museum with a major donation of zoological specimens in 1851, including many rare and 'type' specimens, the ones that act as standards for the species, animals that died in the Knowsley menagerie, and specimens purchased at major sales (e.g. Leverian collection). The vertebrate zoology collection was vastly increased with the purchase of Canon Henry Baker Tristram's collection of birds in 1896.

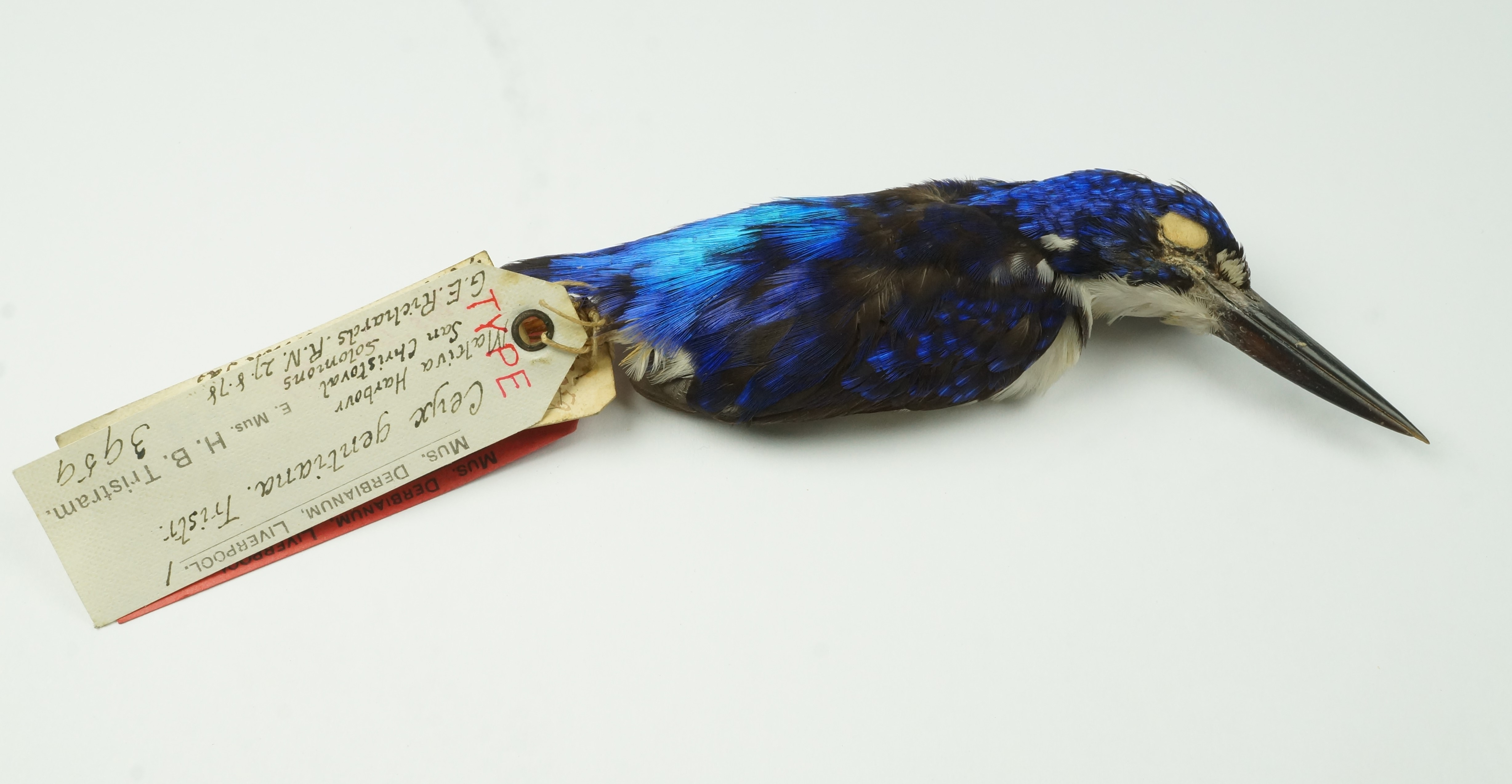
Holotype of Ceyx gentiana Tristram (NML-VZ T3959)

The reserve collection includes animals from famous naturalists such as Charles Darwin, Alfred Russel Wallace, John James Audubon, William Thomas March, John Whitehead and Stamford Raffles, transfers from other museums (Selangor Museum, India Museum), circuses (Barnum and Bailey) and zoos (Southport Zoological Gardens, Chester Zoo); and collections from the museum's expeditions.

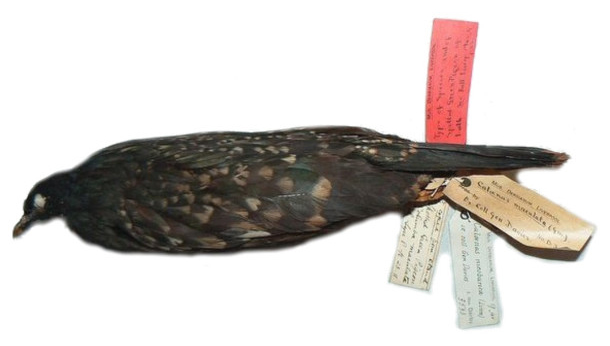
Spotted Green Pigeon, also known as the Liverpool Pigeon (NML-VZ D3538). The only specimen of the species in existence

There also specimens of several extinct species housed in the museum, including the Liverpool pigeon, the great auk (an egg), the Falkland Islands wolf, the South Island piopio, the Lord Howe swamphen, the Passenger pigeon, the dodo, the Pink-headed duck, the Norfolk kākā, the Stephens Island wren, the Bushwren, the Carolina Parakeet, the Cuban Macaw, the long-tailed hopping mouse and the thylacine.

The museum had extensive public galleries containing vertebrate taxidermy specimens, but these were lost when during the air raids of May 1941 the building was completely destroyed by fire. Some mammal specimens from the original 13th Earl of Derby collection did survive, along with most of the cabinet bird skins. The galleries featured an exhibition of British mammals, amphibians and reptiles, with several cases imaged in 1932.

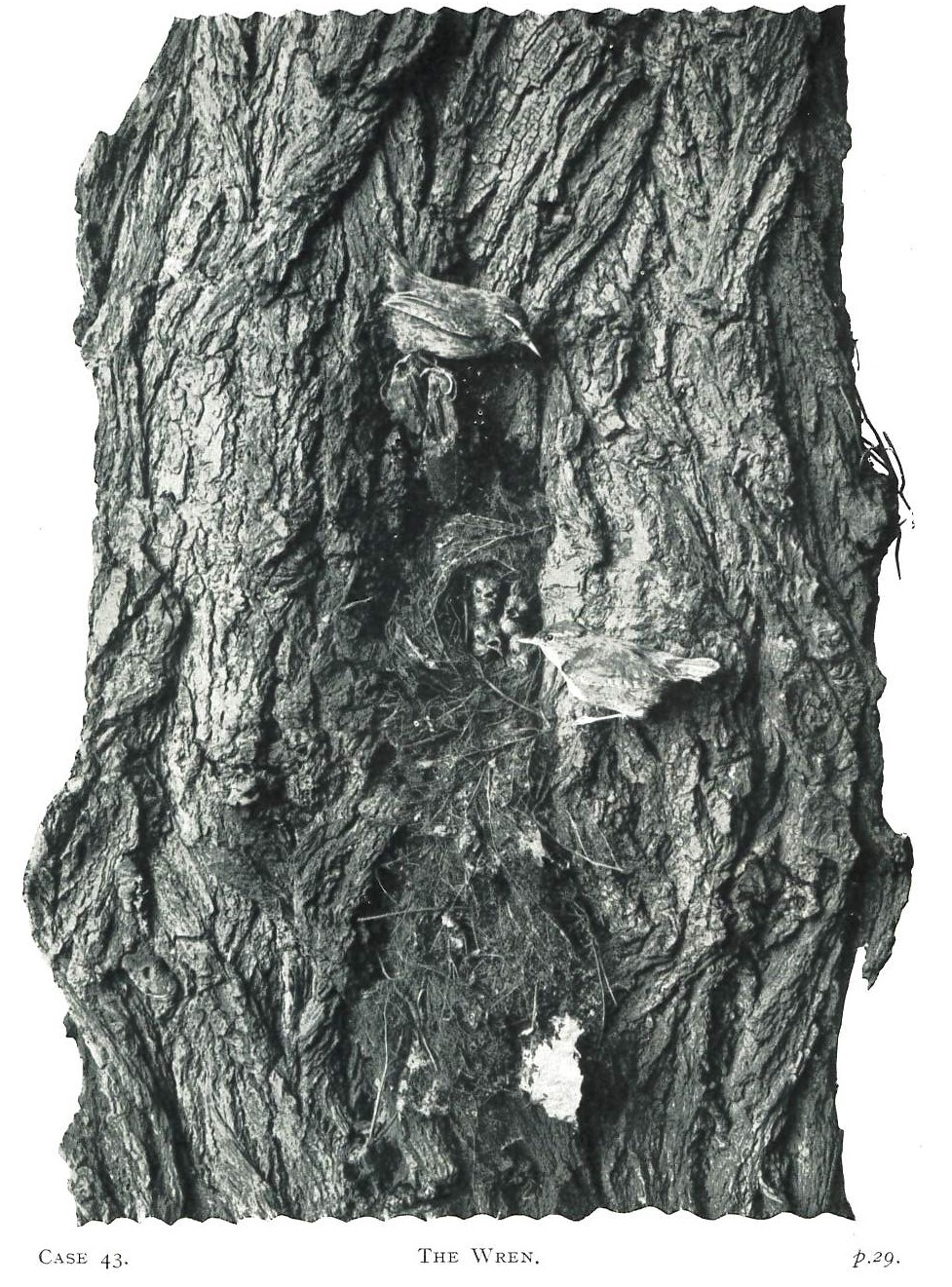
The Wren. Case 43

The British Birds Gallery featured 131 cases, with several cases imaged between 1914 and 1932. These were the work of taxidermist Mr. J. W. Cutmore who would later produce a series of well-known dioramas at Norwich Museum.

The current natural history gallery is called Endangered Planet and features a limited number of taxidermy vertebrates in four diorama representing biomes, savanna, tropical rainforest, taiga, tundra. The gallery can be visited virtually.

==== Botany ====
The museum's collections have grown considerably since then and now also include important botanical specimens dating back over 200 years, which represent most of Britain and Ireland's native flora.

The museum had a gallery of economic botany which was destroyed during the air raids of May 1941.

==== Geology ====
The time tunnel gallery displays a series of models across geological time.

The geological collection at World Museum contains over 40,000 fossils as well as extensive rock and mineral collections. Each of these exhibits show information about the origins, structure and history of the planet earth.

Founded in 1858, only seven years after the museum's establishment, much of the original collection was destroyed during the Second World War. The post-war collections have expanded considerably, thanks in part to the acquisition of several significant museum and university collections.

The largest of these was the University of Liverpool's geological collection that includes some 6,600 fossil specimens. The collection covers the following areas: palaeontology, rocks and minerals.

== Facial recognition system ==
Facial recognition technology, widespread in China, was used at Liverpool's World Museum, during the China's First Emperor and the Terracotta Warriors exhibition. The museum said the scanning equipment was used on the advice of (Merseyside Police), not the Chinese lenders. In a statement, the director of Big Brother Watch, Silkie Carlo, said that the "authoritarian surveillance tool is rarely seen outside of China."
