= Son of Town Hall =

Junk Raft

History

United States
- Name: Son of Town Hall
- Builder: Poppa Neutrino, New York City
- Laid down: 1992
- Launched: 1995
- Notes: "Self-righting, self-steering under sail, unsinkable (floating on logs and polyurethane foam)"

General characteristics
- Class & type: Junk raft
- Length: 50 ft. (15.5 meters)
- Beam: 12 feet (3.5 meters)
- Draft: 20" (2/3 meter) (boards up); 6 feet (2 meters) (boards down)
- Propulsion: Auxiliary diesel: 19 HP Lister
- Sail plan: Square rig

Son of Town Hall was a junk raft which made a Transatlantic crossing in 1998, built by Poppa Neutrino.

Writer Alec Wilkinson gave a vivid description of Son of Town Hall in his book The Happiest Man in the World, saying: "The raft looked like a specter, a ghost ship, as if made from rags and rope and lumber, a vessel from the end of the world, or something medieval, a flagship of nothingness, the Armada of the Kingdom of Oblivion."

== See also ==
- Poppa Neutrino
- Junk raft
