= Jonas Goro Gadelius =

Swedish businessman (1926 - 2003)

- Born: November 25, 1926
- Died: July 31, 2003 (aged 76)
- Education: Lundsbergs boarding school
- Occupation: Businessman
- Years active: 1950–1995
- Employer: Gadelius K.K.
- Known for: Chairman of Gadelius K.K. Advocacy of Swedish–Japanese business relations
- Notable work: Collector of netsuke, donated to the World Museum, Liverpool
- Spouse: Gabita Gadelius
- Children: 1 (Lorena)
- Parent(s): Knut and Gabriella Gadelius

Jonas Goro Gadelius (25 November 1926-31 July 2003) was a Swedish businessman who served as chairman of Gadelius K.K, a trading and engineering company based in Japan. He promoted business and industrial relations between Sweden and Japan.

== Early life and education ==
The youngest of seven children, Gadelius was born in 1926 to Knut and Gabriella Gadelius. His father founded Gadelius AB in Gothenburg in 1890 and Gadelius K.K. in Tokyo in 1907. Gadelius spent his early years in Tokyo before his family moved back to Sweden in 1932.

He completed his secondary education at Lundsbergs boarding school in Sweden. He served in the Swedish Armed Forces before joining the family business.

== Career ==
In 1950, Gadelius moved to Japan to work for Gadelius K.K., maintaining the family's involvement in industrial cooperation with Japan. By the mid-1960s, he became President of Gadelius K.K. and played a role in leading the company during a period of rapid industrial growth in Japan. Under his leadership, the company transitioned from general importing to a focus on specialized distribution and local manufacturing. The company began licensing advanced Swedish and Western technologies for the Japanese market in sectors such as energy, pollution control, marine engines, steel, pulp, and paper industries.

In 1977, Gadelius became Chairman of the Board of Gadelius K.K. He later stepped down during structural changes in the Japanese market between 1992 and 1995.

== Personal life and legacy ==
Gadelius married Gabita Gadelius. They had one daughter, Lorena.

Jonas collected Japanese art, including a significant collection of netsuke, which are small sculptures traditionally carved from ivory or wood. His collection, featuring works from renowned carvers such as Kagetoshi, Tomotada, Morita Soko, and Masatoshi, was donated to the World Museum in Liverpool, where it remains on display.

Jonas Goro Gadelius died in London on 31 July 2003 at the age of 76.
