= Vivaldi Atlantic 4 =

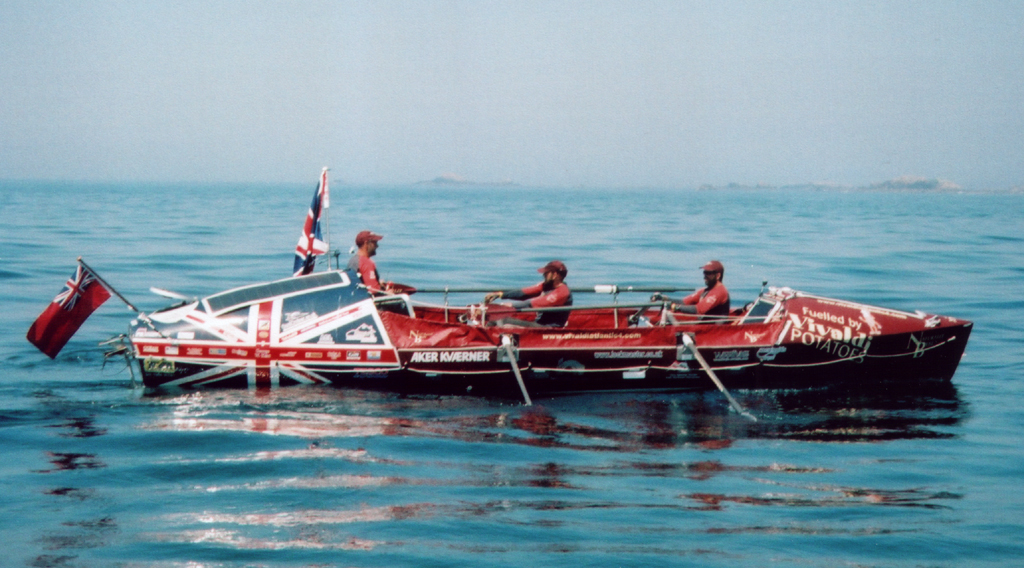
The Vivaldi Atlantic 4 team on board Naturally Best approaches the Isles of Scilly after completing their record crossing of the Atlantic Ocean in July 2005.

The Vivaldi Atlantic 4 was a British Atlantic crossing record attempt that took place in the summer of 2005.

== Crew ==
- Steve Dawson from Boston, Lincolnshire
- Nigel Morris from Ingleby Barwick, Teesside
- George Rock from Ingleby Barwick
- Rob Munslow from Monmouth

The crew were all members of the 2002 Skandia Atlantic crossing attempt which ended after 21 days when their rudder was ripped off in a storm.

== The route ==
The crew's aim was to break existing Atlantic Rowing Records and to create a new one for rowing in the North Atlantic eastwards directly to mainland UK. They set off from St. John's, Newfoundland, Canada on 31 May 2005 and intended to finish in Falmouth, Cornwall, England less than 55 days later. The route was 2100 miles long.

== The boat ==
Naturally Best

- Length: 29 ft
- Weight: 320 kg

The boat was designed and built by Devon-based firm, Woodvale Events.

== The record ==
The Naturally Best crossed the finish line near Bishop Rock lighthouse, off the Isles of Scilly on 11 July, taking 39 days, 22 hours, 9 minutes and 30 seconds and smashing the previous 55-day record.
