= Poppa Neutrino =

- Born: William David Pearlman; October 15, 1933; Fresno, California, United States
- Died: January 23, 2011 (aged 77); New Orleans, Louisiana, United States
- Other names: David Pearlman, William Maloney
- Occupations: Raftbuilder musician, and founder of the oWL PaRTY
- Spouse: Betsy Terrell
- Website: ,

Poppa Neutrino, born William David Pearlman, (October 15, 1933 in Fresno, California – January 23, 2011 in New Orleans, Louisiana) was a musician, raft builder and "free spirit" who lived his life outside expected norms. He has been called a modern primitive, a nomad, a permanent dropout, raftbuilder and musician.

== Biography ==
Inspired by a documentary he saw when he was twelve years old, in which Australian aborigines periodically burnt their homes and walked away naked, free to start a new life, he taught "triadic thinking" and empowerment to people trapped by the concept of job and rent. Thus Poppa Neutrino built his own homes out of discarded materials on free space (public waterways) and supported himself as a street musician. He changed his name at the age of 52 after surviving a severe illness.

Neutrino built several rafts out of donated and recycled materials on which he lived and sailed. In 1997-98 Poppa Neutrino sailed one of his homemade junk rafts, Son of Town Hall, from North America to Europe, becoming the second person to sail a raft across the Atlantic and the first to do so on a raft made from trash. Betsy Terrell, his wife, was the captain and navigator on the crossing.

In 2008 Poppa Neutrino moved to Burlington, Vermont to build another raft, this time on Lake Champlain. In 2010, he planned a circumnavigation of the globe, leaving Burlington, Vermont to head first south to Florida with three sailors and their three dogs aboard a new craft, a 37-foot trimaran complete with two outboards, a heated pilot house and four cabins. However, on November 9 their raft was driven onto rocks on Thompson's Point, Charlotte, Vermont. Poppa Neutrino and his fellow rafters were rescued from Lake Champlain.

Neutrino died on January 23, 2011, in a hospital in New Orleans, Louisiana, of heart failure. Neutrino's jazz funeral was attended by dozens wearing bright costumes.

Married "several times," he had four children, as well as step- and adopted children.

== Books and films about his life ==
Poppa Neutrino's life and travels have been the subject of articles and books, including two by Alec Wilkinson and a documentary film.
