= Junk raft =

Raft made from recycled materials

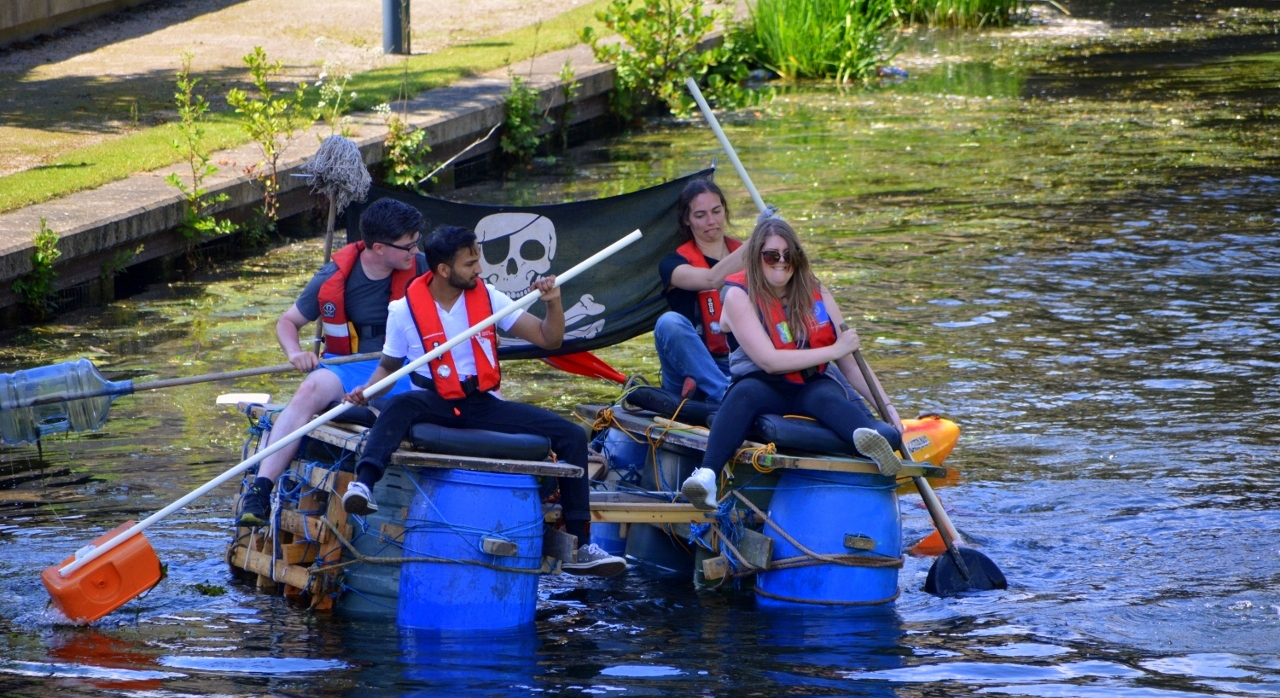
Competitors in the Junk Boat Challenge in Leeds, England, in 2016

A junk raft is a type of home-built watercraft made of plastic bottles or other recycled materials constructed by artists and community-minded groups organizing recreational flotillas, or by environmentally concerned individuals seeking to draw attention to the problem of floating debris and the need for recycling. It can also be an improvised small, functional watercraft from readily available materials.

== JUNK Raft Project ==
The JUNK Raft Project was organized by Dr. Marcus Eriksen, Joel Paschal and Anna Cummins in Long Beach, California in 2008, to bring attention to the issue of plastic pollution in the Great Pacific Garbage Patch. The project was launched with the Algalita Marine Research Foundation, after founder Charles J. Moore encountered the patch in 1997. Organizers hoped to "creatively raise awareness about plastic debris and pollution in the ocean," specifically the Great Pacific Garbage Patch trapped in the North Pacific Gyre, by sailing 2,600 miles across the Pacific Ocean on a 30-foot (9.1 m) raft made from an old Cessna 310 aircraft fuselage and six pontoons filled with 15,000 old plastic bottles. Crewed by Dr. Marcus Eriksen of the Foundation and film-maker Joel Paschal, the raft set off from Long Beach, California on 1 June 2008, arriving in Honolulu, Hawaii on 28 August 2008. On the way, they gave valuable water to record-holding ocean rower Roz Savage, also on an environmental awareness voyage, when her supplies dwindled.

The construction of the JUNK Raft began in April 2008 and was finished the following month. The huge undertaking of constructing a seaworthy raft from "junk" was aided by volunteers from the environmental education programs of Bell Elementary School, Green Ambassadors, Muse Elementary School, Santa Monica High School, and Westbridge School for Girls. The volunteers lent a hand by cleaning bottles, fastening bottle caps, and stuffing them into the recycled fisherman's net pontoon forms.

== See also ==
- Son of Town Hall, junk raft that crossed the Atlantic, made by Poppa Neutrino
- Plastiki, plastic bottle boat which made an expedition to the Great Pacific Garbage Patch
