= Red, White and Blue (ship) =

Lifeboat that crossed the Atlantic in 38 days in 1866

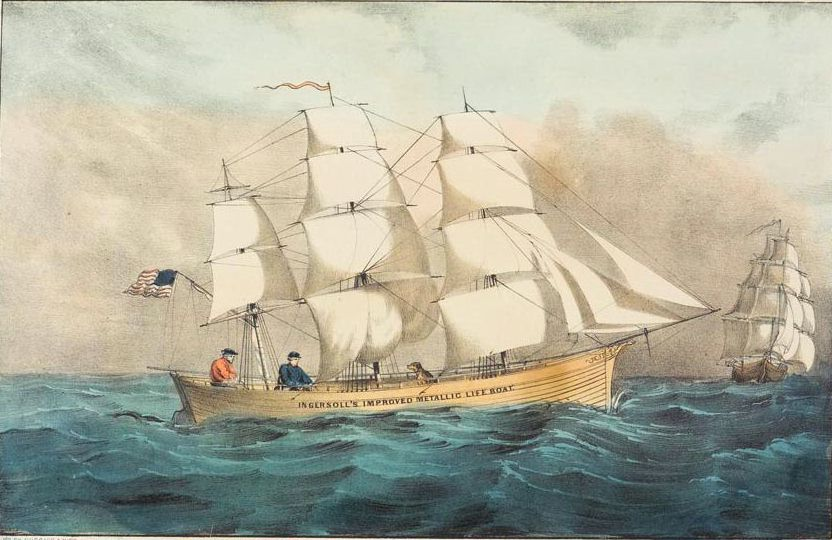
- Red, White and Blue in full sail in 1866 (Note: The Currer & Ives lithograph may have been reproduced in colour version in 1868)

History

United States
- Name: Red, White and Blue
- Owner: John Morley Hudson, and American Boat & Oar Bazaar
- Builder: Oliver Roland Ingersoll
- Launched: 21 June 1866

General characteristics
- Class & type: Ingersoll's Improved Metallic Lifeboat
- Tons burthen: 2.38
- Length: 26 ft (7.9 m)
- Beam: 6.17 ft (1.88 m)
- Depth of hold: 2.66 ft (0.81 m)
- Propulsion: Sail
- Sail plan: Ship-rigged (Note: In 1866, "barque-rigged" could mean "ship-rigged")
- Complement: 2

Red, White and Blue was a ship-rigged, 26-foot (7.9 m) lifeboat, built in New York. With her crew John Morley Hudson, Francis Edward Fitch and Fanny the dog, she broke an American record for a small vessel by crossing the Atlantic from New York to Margate, England, in 38 days in 1866.

She had a pressed and moulded, galvanised iron hull, and her masts, spars and sails were like those of a full-sized clipper, but sized in proportion to the hull. The voyage was tough. The crew endured heavy weather, a leaking hull, and spoiled stores; the dog died at sea.

The ship and crew received the welcome due to them at Margate, but some of the British public found it difficult to credit the success of the attempt, although the voyage was ultimately proved genuine. The ship was exhibited in 1866 at The Crystal Palace, London, and in 1867 at the Exposition Universelle, Paris, where Hudson was granted an interview with Emperor Louis Napoleon.

The original purpose of the voyage was to provide publicity for Oliver Roland Ingersoll's invention, Ingersoll's Improved Metallic Lifeboat. The exhibition of the ship in London and Paris was intended to consolidate that publicity and to attract orders from shipowners. However the temporary British controversy about the validity of the crossing attempt, and Hudson's consequent difficulties and debts, contributed to the rather quiet way in which this story ended.

== Ship ==
=== Description ===
The name of the ship, Red, White and Blue, was chosen as a cosmopolitan and diplomatic reference to the flags of the United States, the United Kingdom, France, and others. After reaching the United Kingdom, the vessel was given the Scots nickname of Wee Craft or Wee Ship.

The hull of Red, White and Blue was constructed of galvanised iron, "pressed and moulded to a clinker built configuration" by the inventor Oliver Roland Ingersoll. This Ingersoll's Improved Metallic Lifeboat was a new design for onboard lifeboats and jolly boats, the intended advantage being lightness and ease of maintenance. She was 26 ft (7.9 m) LOA of 2.38 tons, beam 6.17 ft (1.88 m) with a hold depth of 2.66 ft (0.81 m), or 3 ft (0.91 m) from deck to keel (not that she had a deck), and was pointed at bow and stern. She was fitted out with a ship-rig at New York. (Note: Contemporary sources call her a barque, and refer to barque-rigging, but this was a Romantic and archaic usage of "barque", meaning a "ship" in general. It did not refer to a specific rigging plan.) The tiny rigging was in proportion to the hull, that is to say, a fraction of the size of a normal cargo ship. The sails were made to the design of D.M. Cumisky of 39 South Street, New York, and the spars were made by Arthur Bartlett of 252 South Street.

This was an open boat, with no shelter apart from a canvas dodger. She had watertight compartments. That is to say, she had a 4-foot (1.2 m) watertight compartment at each end, and she contained air cylinders at the ends and at the sides, "with safety valves that will cause the boat to free herself of water in a few minutes." In 1866 she carried "12 ten-gallon kegs of water, 200 lbs of bread, 5 lbs coffee, 2 lbs of tea, 10 lbs butter, 4 boxes smoked herrings, 1 dozen cans of milk, 15 lbs smoked beef, 17 lbs cheese, 4 bottles pickles, mustard, pepper, salt and sauce, 2 bottles of brandy, one bottle of whisky and one bottle of bitters." Other stores carried for the 1866 voyage were: "2 dozen cans roast beef, 2 dozen cans roast turkey, 2 dozen cans roast chicken, 2 dozen cans mutton soup." These were donated by Isaac Reckhow of Brooklyn, who also donated the dog.

For the master's department she carried, "a boat compass, quadrant, charts, parallel rule, dividers, weather indicator, longline, (Note: The longline could have been for longline fishing, or it may have been a plumb bob) glass, 7 lbs lead, American ensign and pennant, English and French ensigns, anchor and fifty fathoms of rope, but no chronometer." In case of illness she carried "six bottles of Indian liniment, six bottles of vegetable pills, a bottle of powders, and another mixture of some marvellous character, which we are told is the never-failing smallpox cure, and has cured yellow fever and cholera".

The inscription, "Ingersoll's Improved Metallic Life Boat" was written along both sides of the hull. The ship's ensign was a "13 star flag, single ply wool bunting with hand appliqued stars". The front inscription identified it as having belonged to Red, White and Blue in 1866, but the reverse inscription said that it had previously been the Civil War flag of the "U.S.S.S. Flambeau's Picket boat 2nd Cutter 1864, Acting Ensign J.M. Hudson". (Note: The flag had the 13 stars arranged in rows of 4, 5 and 4, as per a common design of ship flags in the Civil War era 1862–1865. The flag was later exhibited, along with the silver-plated plaque, at the Cheekwood Museum of Art, around 1990. Flambeau (where the flag came from) was originally built in 1861 as a China-trade brigantine.) The flag as used on the mizzen gaff of Red, White and Blue measured 31 by 42 inches (79 by 107 cm), having had 18 inches (46 cm) cut off its length to fit the smaller ship.

=== History ===
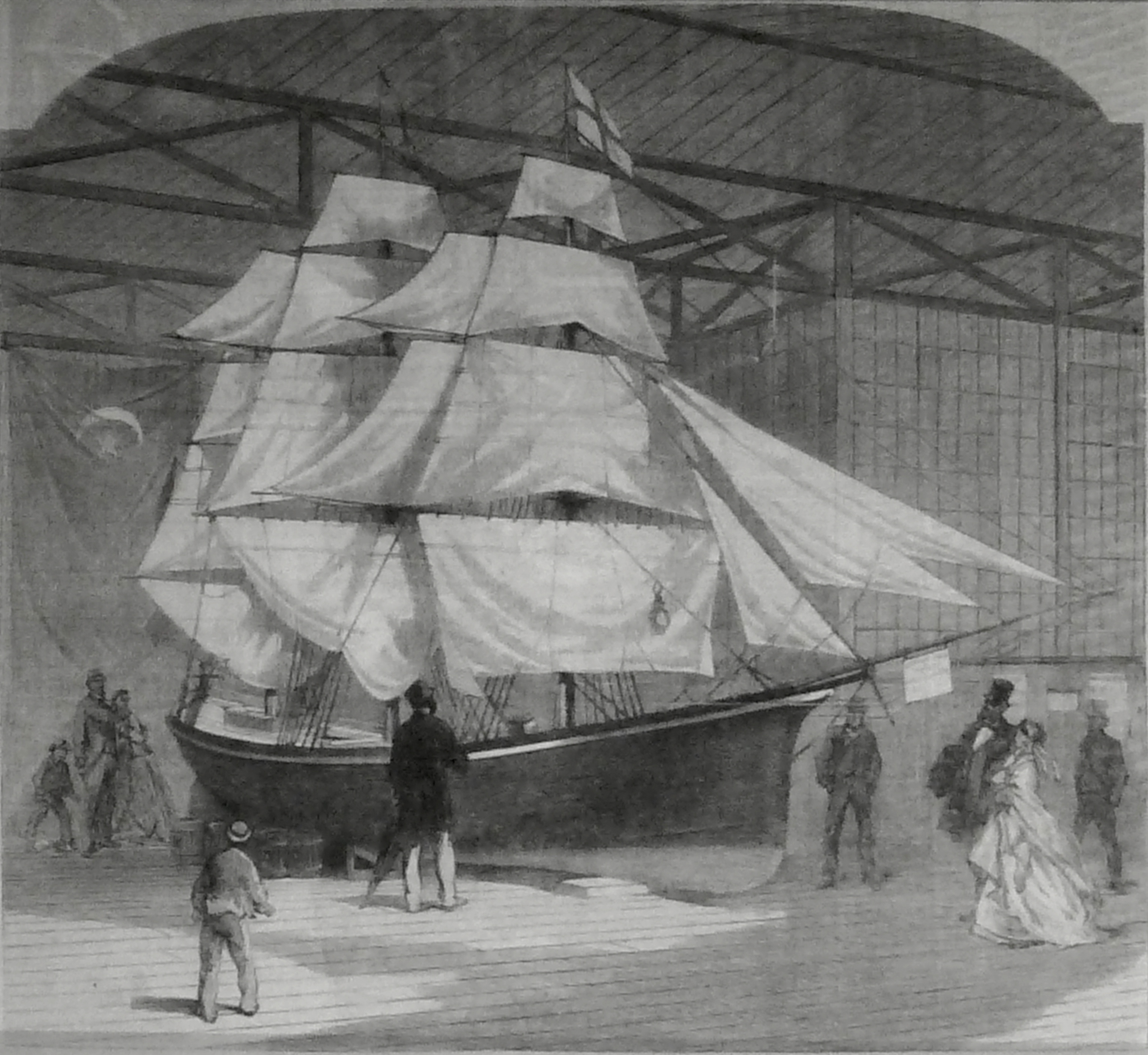
Red, White and Blue at The Crystal Palace, 1866

The ship was launched on 21 June 1866, after having a false keel fitted, making a total keel depth of 7.5 in (19 cm). "She was launched with all her spars standing, bows on, from a dock five feet above the level of the water", with Captain J.M. Hudson aboard. She landed neatly, she did not tip over, and Hudson did not get wet. In 1866, Red, White and Blue was believed to be the "smallest ship ever to cross the Atlantic". After leaving Margate, the crew took the ship to The Crystal Palace where from 25 August she was exhibited during the rest of 1866. At The Crystal Palace, Hudson and Fitch attended daily to make the ship's log available, and to answer questions.

The ship was exhibited at the Paris Exposition Universelle of 1867, from July of that year; however, there were difficulties. "Fair promises were made. Steamers were to tow the boat up the Seine in triumph; but it was towed against a bridge and smashed its masts. Agents were to secure goodly numbers to visit her; but for three months scarcely any one paid for a ticket, until at length the vessel was admitted into the grounds of the Exhibition. Finally, the ruined Captain ran away to England, but cleverly contrived to carry his ship with him." The ship was returned to the United States in 1873.

Hudson's 249-page handwritten log of the transatlantic adventure was titled, The Log and Voyage of the Wee Ship Red-White-and Blue!! The Smallest Ship that Ever Crossed the Atlantic! The First Full Account of Her Passage And Subsequent History in Europa Also Up to Her Arrival Back in New York. Items relating to the ship and crew were sold at auction in 2011 and 2019.

=== Engraved presentations ===
The ship had an oval, engraved plaque, with the words, "Ingersoll Metallic Life Boat Red White and Blue. Ship rigged Sailed from New York, United States, July 9th 1866. Arrived off Hastings, England August 16th 1866. Navigators, Capt. John M. Hudson, and Mate Frank E. Fitch. Inventor and Builder Oliver Roland Ingersoll. Property of the American Boat & Oar Bazaar. 243 & 245 South and 475 & 447 Water Street New York." The silver-plated ship horn was engraved also: "Captn John M. Hudson, ship Red White & Blue, 2 tons 38/100 register, made passage from New York to Margate in 38 days."

== Transatlantic crossing ==
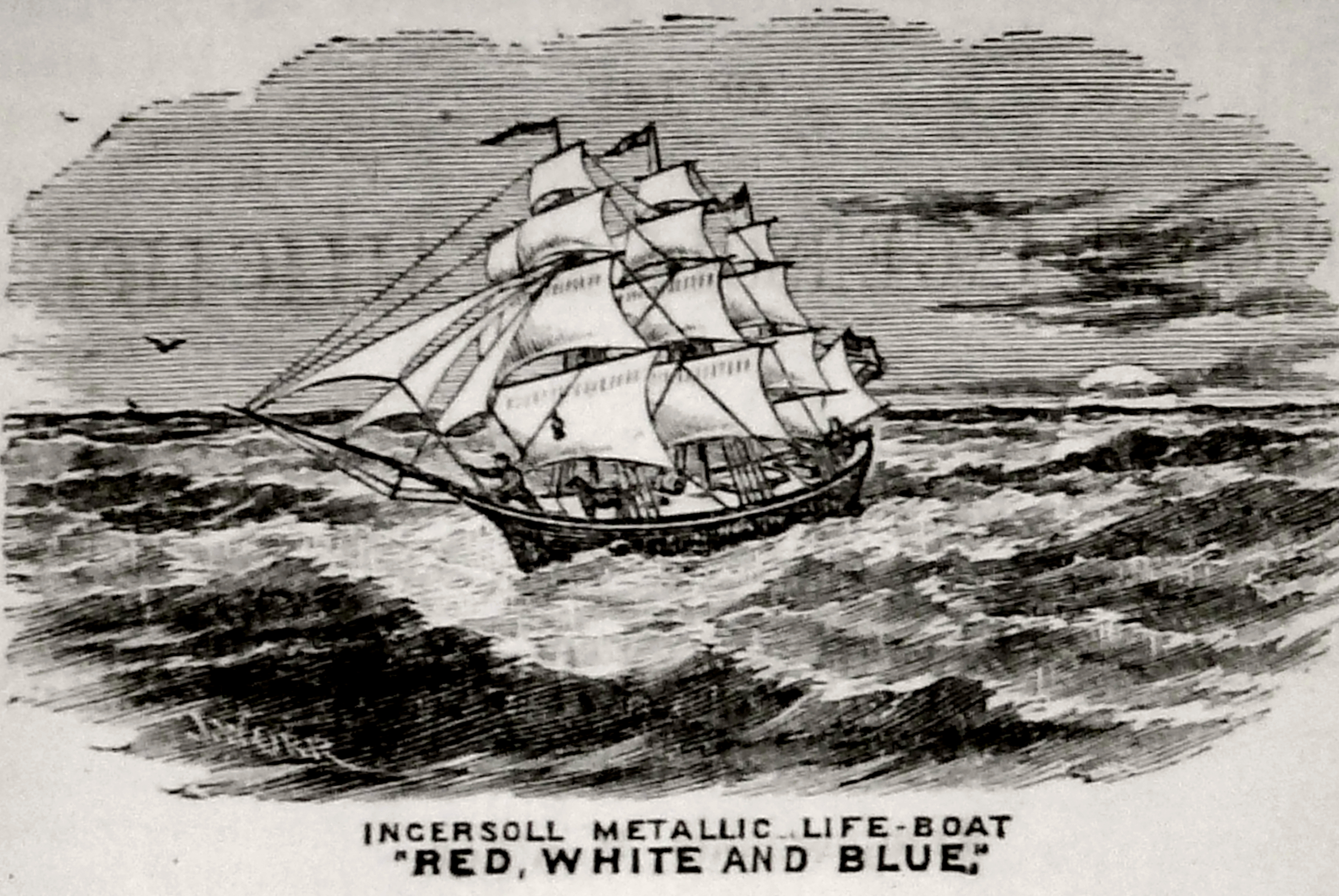
Red, White and Blue at sea, 1866

The ship had already been exhibited at the American Institute fair of 1865, where Ingersoll was awarded a gold medal for his invention. The intention of the voyage was to publicise the new hull-invention with a record-breaking smallest-ship Atlantic crossing, then to exhibit the ship at the prestigious Paris Exposition of 1867. The log book said, "The object of this expedition is to be at the world's fair in Paris, to show the French they have not all complete without something notorious to give the rest a contrast." In order to arrive at the Paris Exposition by its opening date of April 1867, the crew had to perform the crossing in the summer months of 1866, so as to avoid a wintry February 1867 start from New York. The ship was registered on 9 July as if she were a clipper packet: "a clearance in ballast, a crew list [and] a bill of health."

The crew which took the ship from Sandy Hook, New Jersey, to Margate, England, were Captain John M. Hudson and Mate Frank E. Fitch, along with Fanny the poodle. The Red, White and Blue left New York on 9 July 1866, and arrived at Margate on 16 August. Before the voyage, male New Yorkers were commenting: "The fools will never get across", "That captain ought to be tried for murder", and "They ought to be put in a lunatic asylum." Certain American newspapers commented, "One more lunatic weary of breath", or suggested that the ship's name should be "The Fool's Own". However Hudson noted in his log that, "The poor ladies, God bless them! were all praying for us." But Hudson wrote, "Let them all have their own opinions; I have mine."

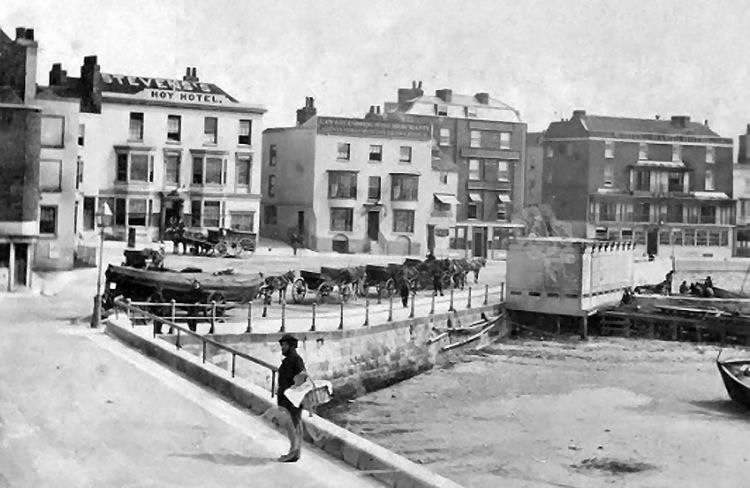
Hoy Hotel, Margate, where Hudson and Fitch stayed.

The steamer Silas O. Pearce towed the ship from Red Rock Point to the Sandy Hook lightship for the start of the voyage. The ship encountered and survived bad weather during the 38-day crossing, although "three times she was thrown on her beam-ends". The chronometer was a rusty pocket watch, which stopped. The crew lost the signal lamp, and salt water spoiled the stored food. The dog died on 19 August, after suffering fits. A leak below the mizzen mast had been discovered and repaired at the launch, but another leak appeared at sea, keeping the crew and stores wet throughout the trip. John MacGregor (1893) said that their uncomfortable journey was the fault of "their own and their friends' mismanagement, the stupid construction of their cabin, the foolish three-masted rig of their boat, the boastful wager of the boat's builder, and their imprudence in painting up the boat on her arrival, and tarring the ropes". They had a kerosene stove, but the roll of the ship prevented its use, so the crew were rarely able to warm their food and drink. The dog was treated well with tinned beef, but Hudson complained that, "That cockpit of ours is a very hard place. You are crampted up just high enough to catch the hips; it cramps the knees and makes us both sore. It is the hardest place on board; the rest is bad enough."

During the crossing they met a green sea turtle, a whale and a shark, and spoke various ships. (Note: "Spoke" is a nautical term. To speak a ship is to move close enough to exchange information (primarily name, position, destination and news) with a passing ship: an aid to survival before the age of radio etc.) At Deal they refused a pilot and attempted to beat upwind towards Margate, but the wind was too much and the ship was towed into Margate harbour by the boat Jessie. The crew arrived at Margate in "somewhat distressed condition", but at Margate Harbour a "large and enthusiastic crowd" was there to greet them. "The crowd on the pier cheered them lustily, and for the next forty-eight hours the little ship was visited by thousands."

=== Controversy ===
The Daily Telegraph lauded the crew's "pluck and endurance, even if bordering upon rashness", and confirmed its belief in the success of the venture. There were some public suggestions that Red, White and Blue had not achieved the voyage alone, but had been carried for part of the west–east journey on board William Tapscott, or had been towed. The controversy was celebrated in comic magazines such as Punch and Fun. The following verse was to be sung to the tune of Britannia's the Pride of the Ocean: (Note: The song Britannia, the Pride of the Ocean was also known as the Red, White and Blue. See Columbia, the Gem of the Ocean.)

Britannia's the pride of the Ocean
The home of the brave and the free;
But Yankees it seems have a notion
That we're much greater fools than we be.
Two men and a dog crossed the briny,
Of course we believe it, we do;
In a boat of two tons, vessel tiny
And they called it the Red, White and Blue.

And they called, &c (in chorus).

In spite of the caviller's malice,
In spite of the doubts on her thrown
It is now at the Crystial Palace
And "seeing is believing" you'll own.
The dog's tale is lost, a sad thing, this!
But the men with their craft remain, two.
So to the Marines let us sing this
New song of the Red, White and Blue.

Here's the craft of the Red, White and Blue
Here's the craft of the Red, White and Blue
So to the Marines we'll go and sing this
New song of the Red, White and Blue.

(by a Metropolitan Martial).

John MacGregor (1893) blamed this misunderstanding partly on the way in which the ship's log was published in re-written form, calling it a "mutilated paper". Although he believed that the ship really had made the voyage without outside assistance, he said,

It is a very great pity that when it has been effected there should be a failure in appreciating its marvellous accomplishment ... After examining, probably more than any body else, the evidence in their case—the men, the log, the documents, and affidavits, and the boat, and its contents, also the numerous doubts and criticisms from all quarters, both in London and Paris, and in Dover and Margate, I have good reason to believe that the Red, White, and Blue had no extraneous help in her voyage across that wide ocean. The unexplained wonder is that men able and willing to perform such a deed as this should be incapable of building and rigging their boat so as to do it comfortably.

As no foundation was discovered for this story, the rumour was ultimately discounted, after the achievement was proved genuine by sightings from other ships, the logs of those ships and of Red, White And Blue, and by the confirmation of weather conditions. On 24 December 1866, Hudson wrote to the London Daily News to confirm politely and with dignity, with evidence from his log and from witnesses, that the voyage was not fraudulent.

== Crew ==
=== Captain John Morley Hudson ===
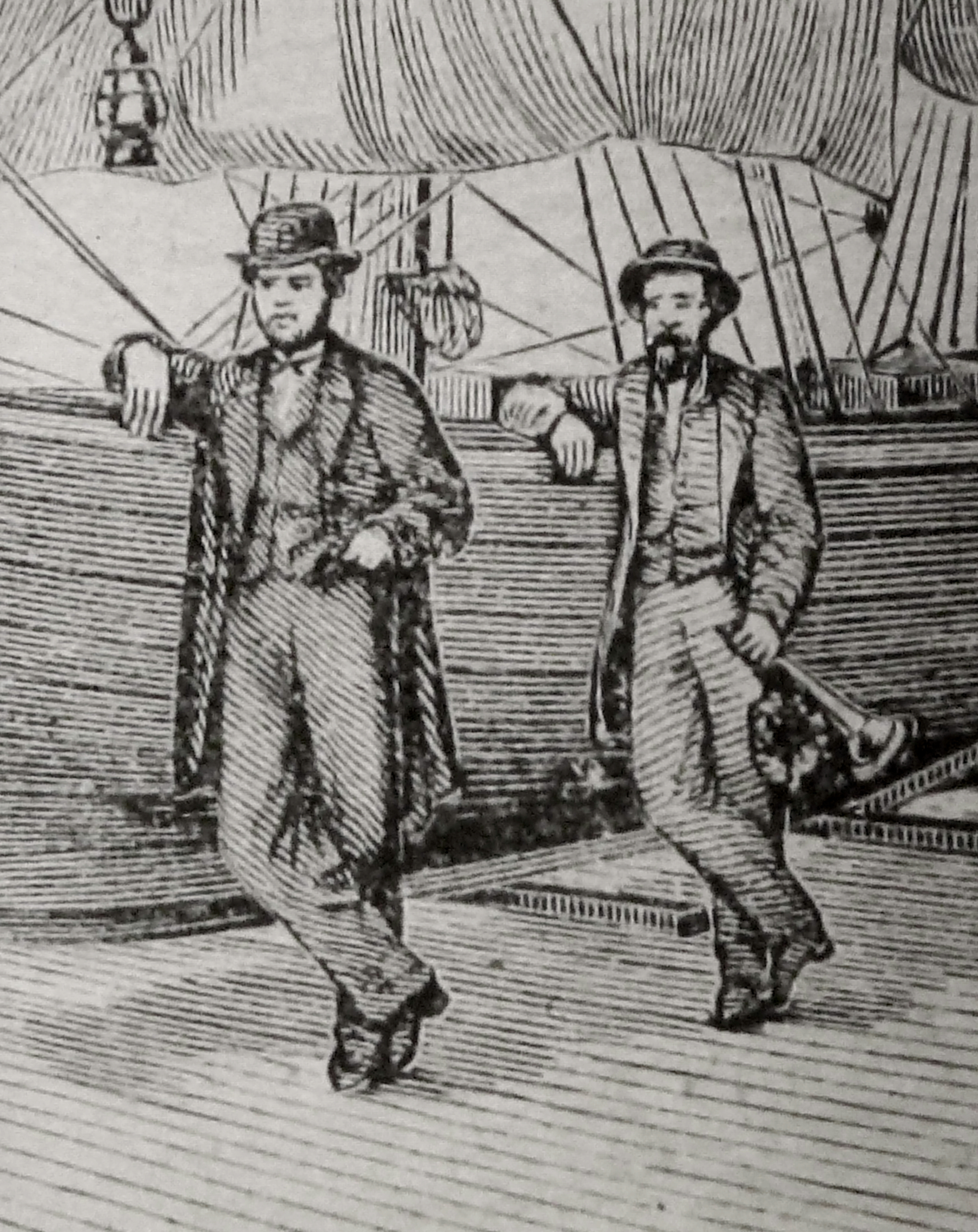
Engraving of Hudson (L) and Fitch (R) at The Crystal Palace, 1866

The ship's captain was John Morley Hudson (Manchester 1 May 1832 – Brooklyn 12 December 1907). He immigrated in 1847 from Manchester, England to Brooklyn, New York and settled there. On 8 August 1856 he was married by a Presbyterian minister to Sarah Ann Saward, (Note: Sarah Anne Saward was possibly the daughter of General F. Saward, who witnessed her and Hudson's marriage certificate.) in Brooklyn. They had three daughters: Frances Ellen "Fannie", Sarah Anne and Selina, baptised between 1865 and 1874. He became a citizen of the United States on 18 January 1877.

He served as acting ensign with the United States Navy from 12 May 1864, to 15 September 1865 when he was honourably discharged. He was registered by the American Ship Masters' Association (of the Civil War era) as a shipmaster, between 14 February 1862 and 1885. He had a 17 April 1883 certificate of competence as a master and pilot of steam vessels around the US coast and the Atlantic Ocean. On 24 July 1895 he captained the steamer James Woodall in the Roloff Expedition in the Cuban War of Independence. On 9 July 1898, Hudson volunteered to rejoin the US Navy as lieutenant, and on 12 July of that year he applied to the navy for the position of line officer. He was granted a pension in 1880.

Regarding Red, White and Blue's transatlantic adventure, Hudson described himself as the "captain, ... originator and promoter of the enterprise". While in Paris, Hudson had a "personal interview" with Emperor Louis Napoleon. Hudson wrote and collated an undated document called, Mind-Your-Helm or Laws of Passing Vessels. (Note: As far as can be established, John Morley Hudson of Brooklyn was not related to Captain William Levereth Hudson (1794–1862) of the US Navy, who was born in Brooklyn) After returning to England, he found himself in financial distress. His wife had had a "serious accident" in America, he could not find work to pay for passage home, and his ship had been seized for debt. A public appeal was made in the hope of assisting his voyage home. He died in 1907 of heart disease at 239 Hawthorne Street, Brooklyn, after a brief illness.

=== Mate Francis Edward Fitch ===
The mate was Francis Edward "Frank" Fitch (born c. 1840).
