= Lifeboat (shipboard) =

Small boat carried on a ship for emergency evacuation

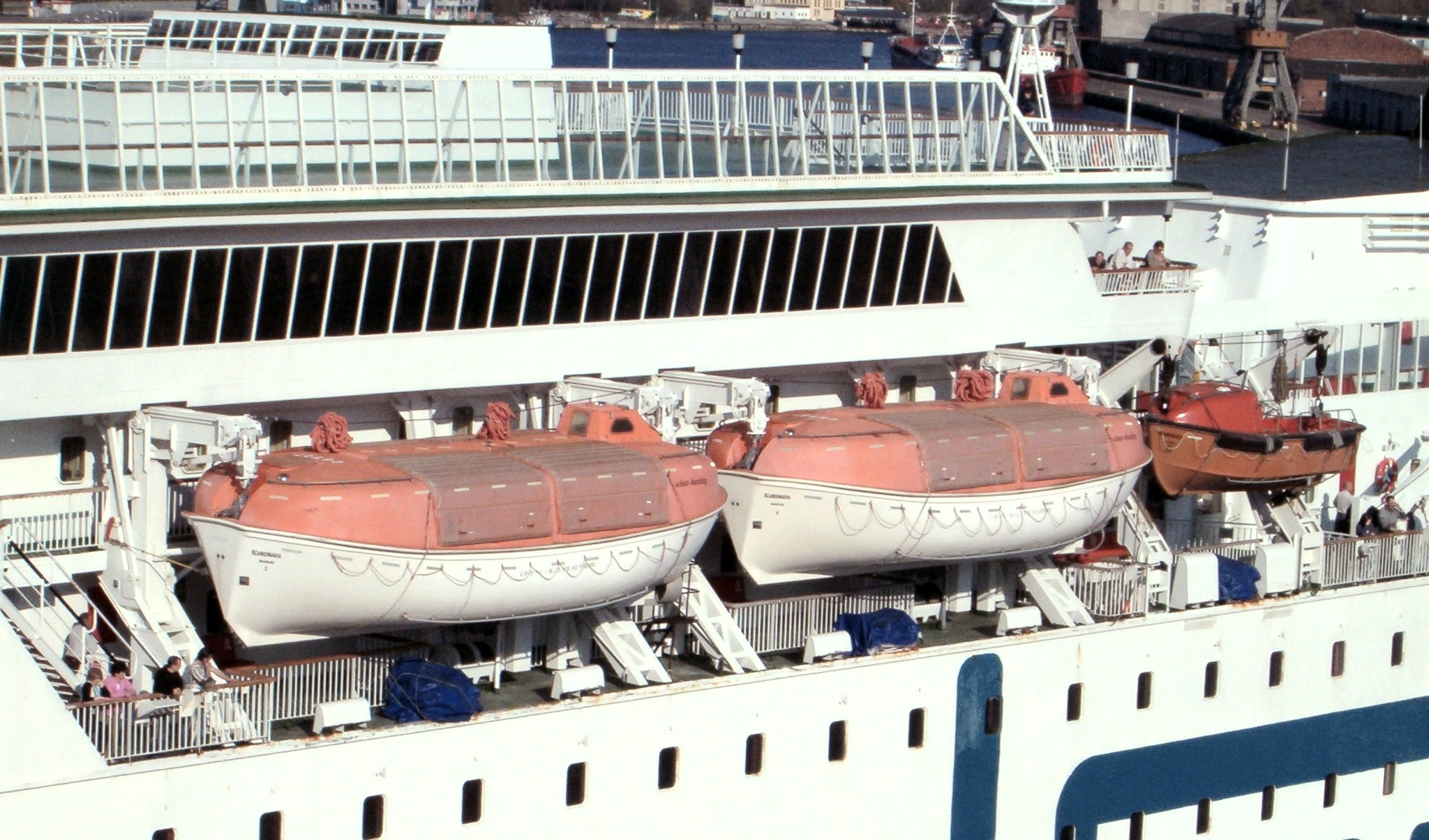
Partially enclosed lifeboats on a passenger liner

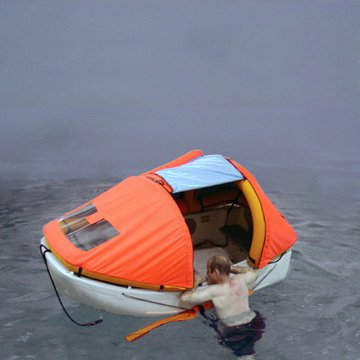
Proactive lifeboat-safety dinghy for recreational cruisers

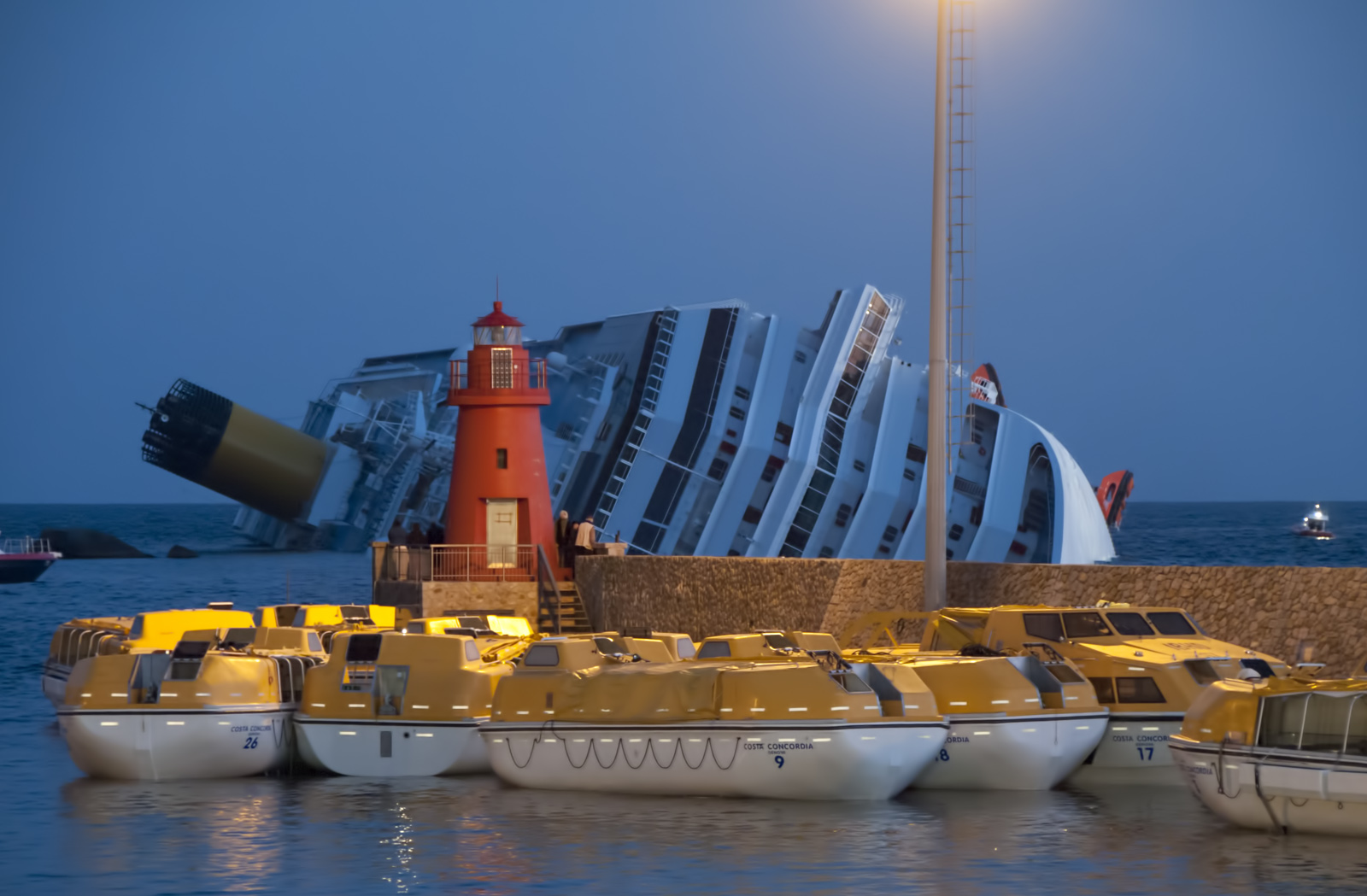
Lifeboats at shore shortly after the Costa Concordia capsized on the coast of Isola del Giglio

A lifeboat or liferaft is a small, rigid or inflatable boat carried for emergency evacuation in the event of a disaster aboard a ship. Lifeboat drills are required by law on larger commercial ships. Rafts (liferafts) are also used. In the military, a lifeboat may double as a whaleboat, dinghy, or gig. The ship's tenders of cruise ships often double as lifeboats. Recreational sailors usually carry inflatable liferafts, though a few prefer small proactive lifeboats that are harder to sink and can be sailed to safety.

Inflatable lifeboats may be equipped with auto-inflation (carbon dioxide or nitrogen) canisters or mechanical pumps. A quick release and pressure release mechanism is fitted on ships so that the canister or pump automatically inflates the lifeboat, and the lifeboat breaks free of the sinking vessel. Commercial aircraft are also required to carry auto-inflating liferafts in case of an emergency water landing; offshore oil platforms also have liferafts.

Ship-launched lifeboats are lowered from davits on a ship's deck, and are hard to sink in normal circumstances. The cover serves as protection from sun, wind and rain, can be used to collect rainwater, and is normally made of a reflective or fluorescent material that is highly visible. Lifeboats have oars, flares and mirrors for signaling, first aid supplies, and food and water for several days. Some lifeboats are more capably equipped to permit self-rescue, with supplies such as a radio, an engine and sail, heater, navigational equipment, solar water stills, rainwater catchments and fishing equipment.

The International Convention for the Safety of Life at Sea (SOLAS) and the International Life-Saving Appliance Code (LSA) requires certain emergency equipment be carried on each lifeboat and liferaft used on international voyages. Modern lifeboats carry an Emergency Position-Indicating Radio Beacon (EPIRB) and either a radar reflector or Search and Rescue Transponder (SART).

== Origins ==
During the Age of Sail, the ship's boats were used as lifeboats in case of emergency.

In March 1870, answering a question at the House of Commons of the United Kingdom about the sinking of PS Normandy, George Shaw-Lefevre said that

...in the opinion of the Board of Trade, it will not be possible to compel the passenger steamers running between England and France to have boats sufficient for the very numerous passengers they often carry. They would encumber the decks, and rather add to the danger than detract from it.

— George Shaw-Lefevre

In the late 1880s, Maria Beasley improved the design of life rafts. She patented a life-saving raft in both the United States and England in 1880.

=== Titanic sinking ===
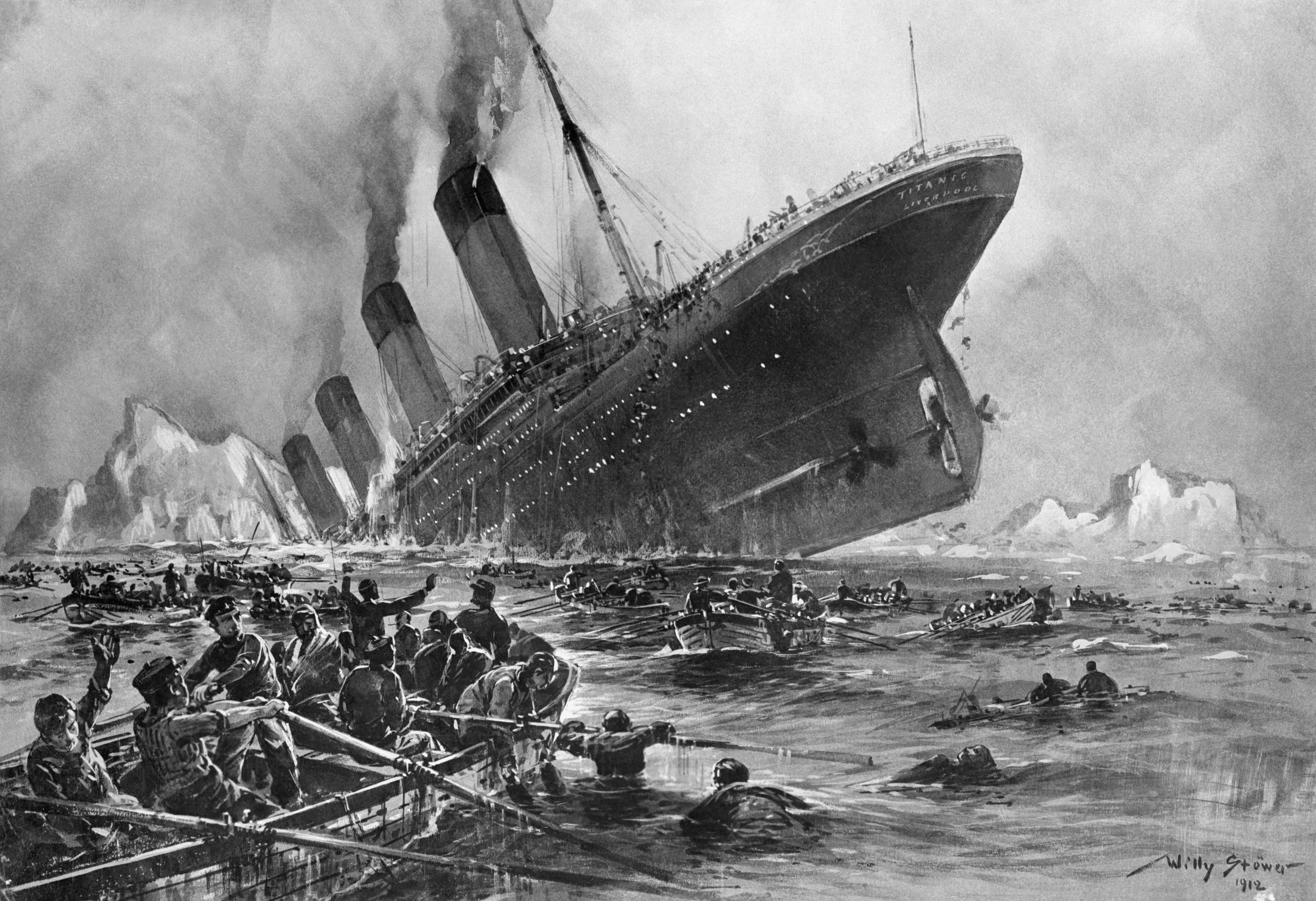
An image depicting the sinking of RMS Titanic surrounded by lifeboats

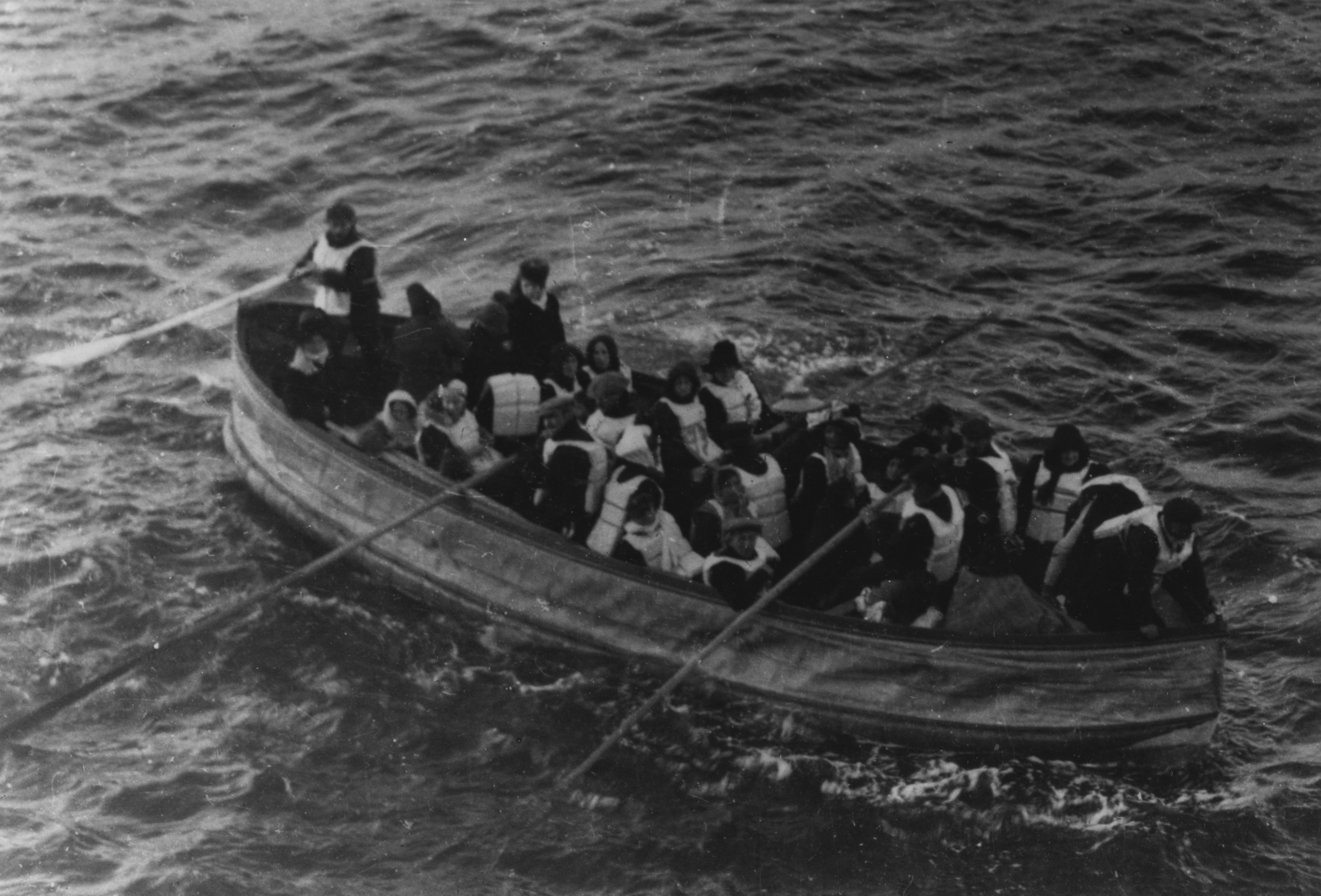
A collapsible Engelhardt lifeboat carrying survivors of the sunken RMS Titanic

By the turn of the 20th century larger ships meant more people could travel, but safety rules regarding lifeboats remained out of date: for example, British legislation concerning the number of lifeboats was based on the tonnage of a vessel and only encompassed vessels of "10,000 gross register tons (grt) and over".

It was not until after the sinking of RMS Titanic on April 15, 1912, that a broader movement began to require a sufficient number of lifeboats on passenger ships for all people on board. Titanic's gross tonnage of 46,000 tonnes was almost five times that which the Board of Trade lifeboat regulations were based on. Even though the 1,178 person capacity of its 20 lifeboats slightly exceeded the required 1,060, it still fell over 2,000 shy of the ship's maximum carrying load of 3,330 people.

The need for so many more lifeboats on the decks of passenger ships after 1912 led to the use of most of the deck space available even on the large ships, creating the problem of restricted passageways. This attempted to be addressed by creating (or adding) separate lifeboat decks, and the wider use of collapsible lifeboats, a number of which had been carried on Titanic.

=== World War II ===
During World War II and the Battle of the Atlantic with convoys going to northern Russia through the Arctic Ocean it was found that the chance of the crews of merchant ships surviving in open lifeboats was not very good unless they were rescued in a couple of hours. The US Navy asked various groups and manufacturers to suggest solutions. The result was the first enclosed, unsinkable, self-righting lifeboat, manufactured in Delanco, New Jersey; the first units were delivered in 1944. These radically new lifeboats were 24 feet (7.3 m) in length and weighed 5,000 lb (2,300 kg). They had two enclosed cabins (one at each end) which could hold a total of 25 persons. The space in between was designed to help persons in the water be pulled aboard, and could be enclosed with a canvas top. The new type lifeboat could be driven either by a small motor or sail.

In 1943 the US developed a balsa wood liferaft that would not sink, irrespective of the number of holes (from enemy fire) in it. These balsa liferafts were designed to hold five to ten men on a platform suspended on the inside or fifteen to twenty-five hanging lines placed on the outsides. They were inexpensive, and during the war thousands were stored in any space possible on US warships and merchant ships. These liferafts were intended only for use during a short term before lifeboats or another ship in the convoy or group could bring them aboard. When USS Indianapolis, a cruiser operating alone, was sunk on 30 July 1945, none of its larger lifeboats were launched, and the survivors had to rely on balsa liferafts automatically released as the ship sank; many of the crew perished, but the balsa liferafts saved others; ultimately 316 of 1,196 crew survived.

=== Totally enclosed lifeboat ===
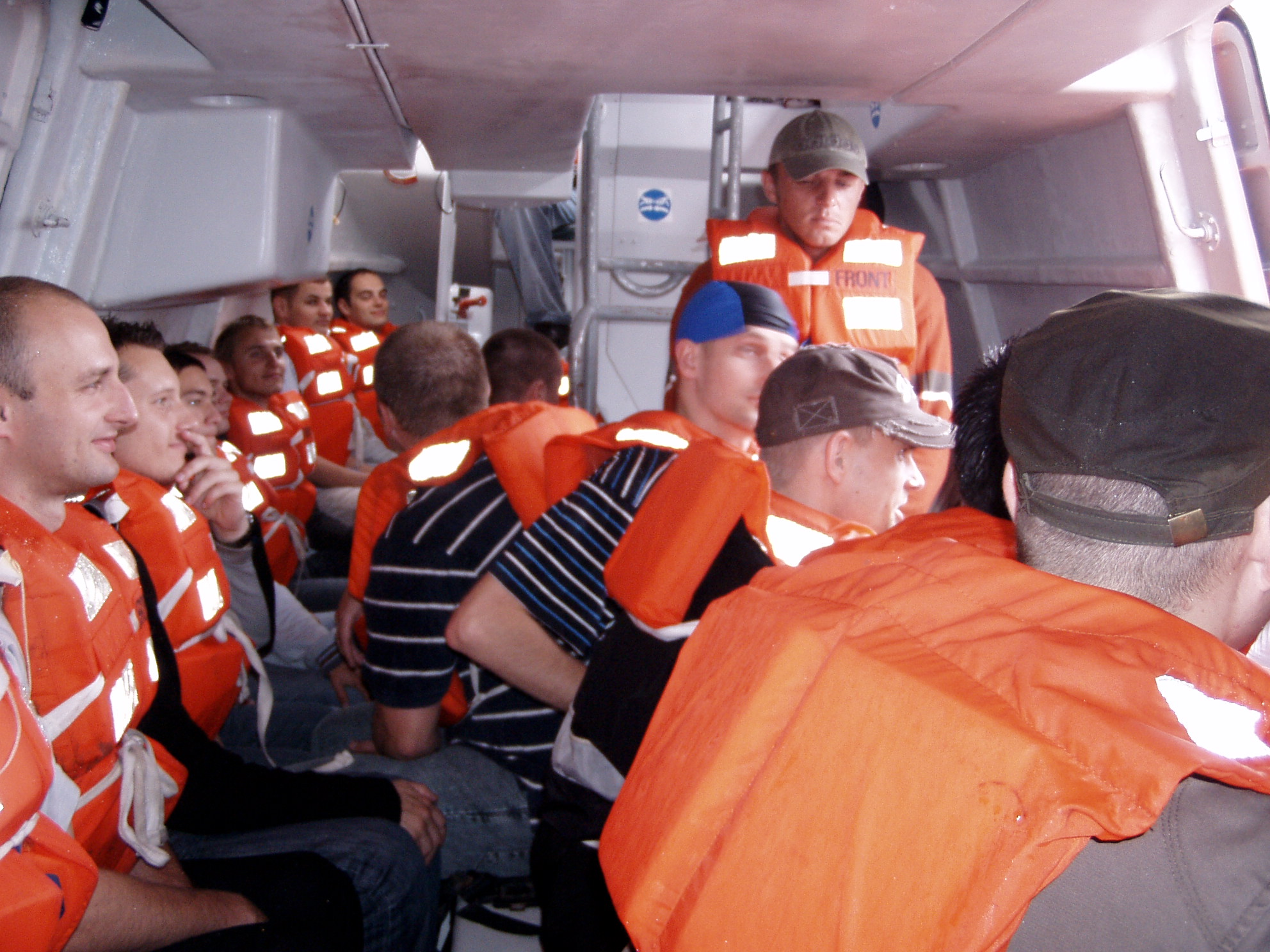
Inside an enclosed lifeboat

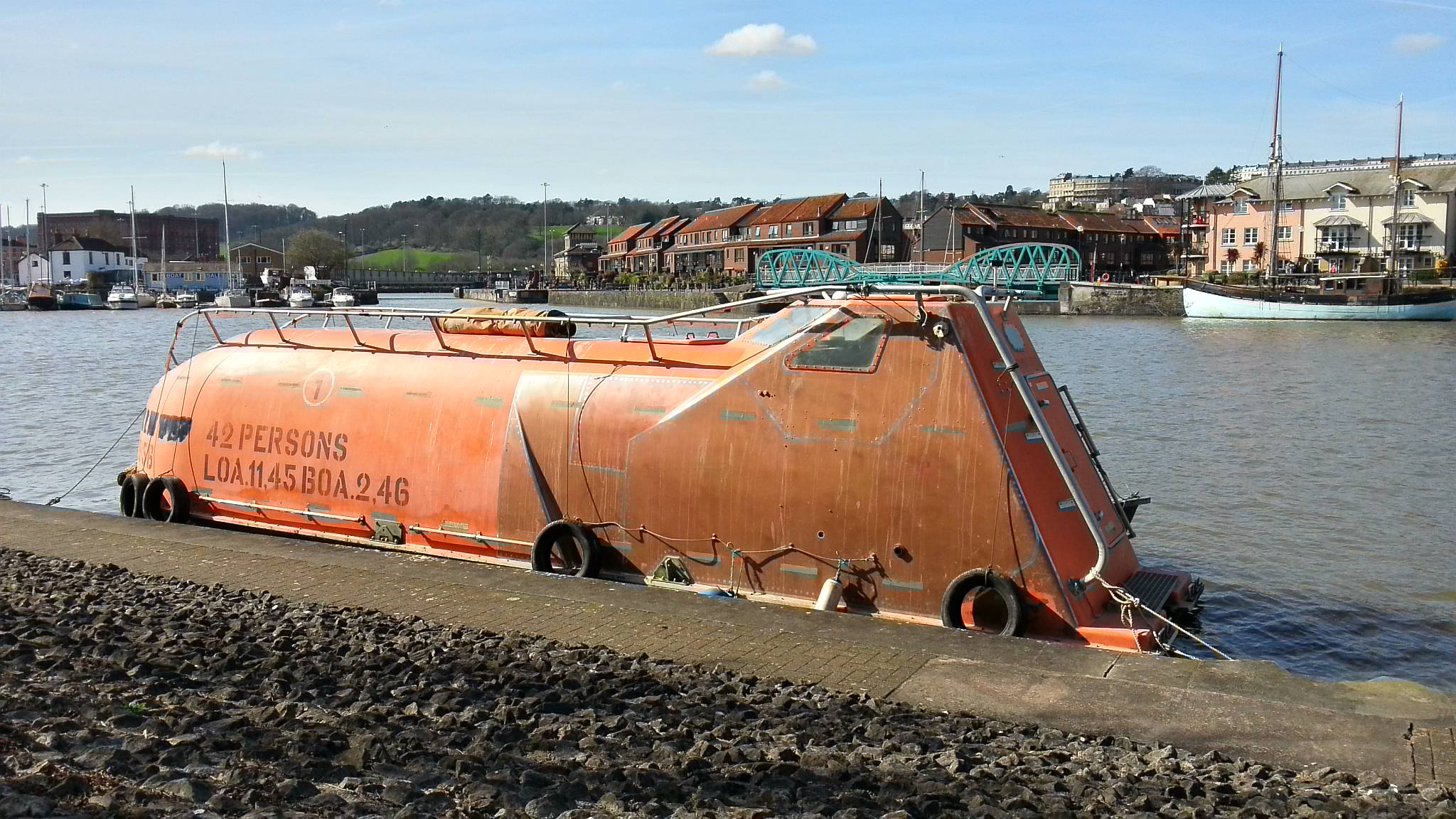
TEMPSC Lifeboat in Bristol harbour, England

TEMPSC (Totally Enclosed Motor Propelled Survival Craft) are mandatory on all merchant vessels, tankers, MODUs, Floating Offshore Oil and Gas Platforms and some fixed offshore oil and gas platforms per 1983 Chapter III amendment to IMO SOLAS 1974. TEMPSC offer superior protection against fire on the water, poisonous gases and severe weather conditions (especially heat, cold and rough seas).

Merchant Vessels whose keels were laid on or before 1 January 1986 are required to have 200% evacuation capacity with one lifeboat fitted on the port side and one on the starboard side, so that a lifeboat is always available even if the ship is listing to one side. Lifeboat capacity is specified and listed on the ship's "safety equipment certificate". Further details of the boats are found in "Form E" of this certificate.

Ships fitted with "free fall" lifeboats are an exception – they have only one boat, at the stern.

== Equipment to be carried on lifeboats and liferafts ==
The Life Saving Appliance (LSA) requires that the following be provided;

=== For lifeboats ===
1. A complement of buoyant oars, sufficient to make headway in calm seas (except for free-fall lifeboats).
2. Two boat hooks.
3. A buoyant bailer and two buckets.
4. A survival manual.
5. Illuminated compass.
6. Sea anchor.
7. Two painters.
8. Two hatchets (one at each end of the lifeboat).
9. Watertight container with 3 litres of fresh water for each person the lifeboat is designed to hold.
10. A rustproof dipper (with lanyard).
11. A rustproof graduated drinking vessel.
12. A food ration with an energy value of at least 10,000 kJ (2390 Calories) for each person the lifeboat is designed to hold, packed in airtight and waterproof packaging.
13. Four red rocket parachute flares.
14. Six red hand flares.
15. Two buoyant orange smoke signals.
16. One electric torch suitable for Morse signalling with spare batteries and bulb (in a waterproof container).
17. One daylight signalling mirror.
18. One copy of life saving signals on waterproof paper.
19. One whistle or equivalent sound signal.
20. One first aid kit in a resealable waterproof container.
21. Anti-seasickness medication sufficient for each person for 48 hours.
22. One jack knife attached by a lanyard.
23. Three tin openers.
24. Two rescue quoits with 30 meters of floating line.
25. Manual pump suitable for bailing (if lifeboat not self bailing).
26. One set of fishing tackle.
27. Tools for adjustments.
28. Fire extinguishing equipment suitable for liquid fires.
29. A searchlight.
30. A radar reflector.
31. Thermal protective aids, two or for 10% of occupants, whichever is greater.

=== For liferafts ===
1. One rescue quoit with 30 meters of floating line.
2. One buoyant rescue knife with lanyard (two if liferaft holds more than 13 persons).
3. One buoyant bailer (two if liferaft holds more than 13 persons).
4. Two sponges.
5. Two sea anchors.
6. Two buoyant paddles.
7. Three tin openers and a pair of scissors.
8. One first aid kit in a resealable waterproof container.
9. One whistle or equivalent sound signal.
10. Four red rocket parachute flares.
11. Six red hand flares.
12. Two buoyant orange smoke signals.
13. One electric torch suitable for Morse signalling with spare batteries and bulb (in a waterproof container).
14. One radar reflector
15. One daylight signalling mirror.
16. One copy of life saving signals on waterproof paper.
17. One set of fishing tackle.
18. A food ration with an energy value of at least 10,000 kJ (2,400 Cal) for each person the liferaft is designed to hold, packed in airtight and waterproof packaging.
19. Watertight container with 1.5 litres of fresh water for each person the liferaft is designed to hold. (0.5 litre per person may be replaced with desalination equipment).
20. One graduated rustproof drinking vessel.
21. Anti-seasickness medication sufficient for each person for 48 hours.
22. Survival instructions.
23. Immediate action instructions.
24. Thermal protective aids, two or for 10% of occupants, whichever is greater.

== Liferaft versus lifeboat ==
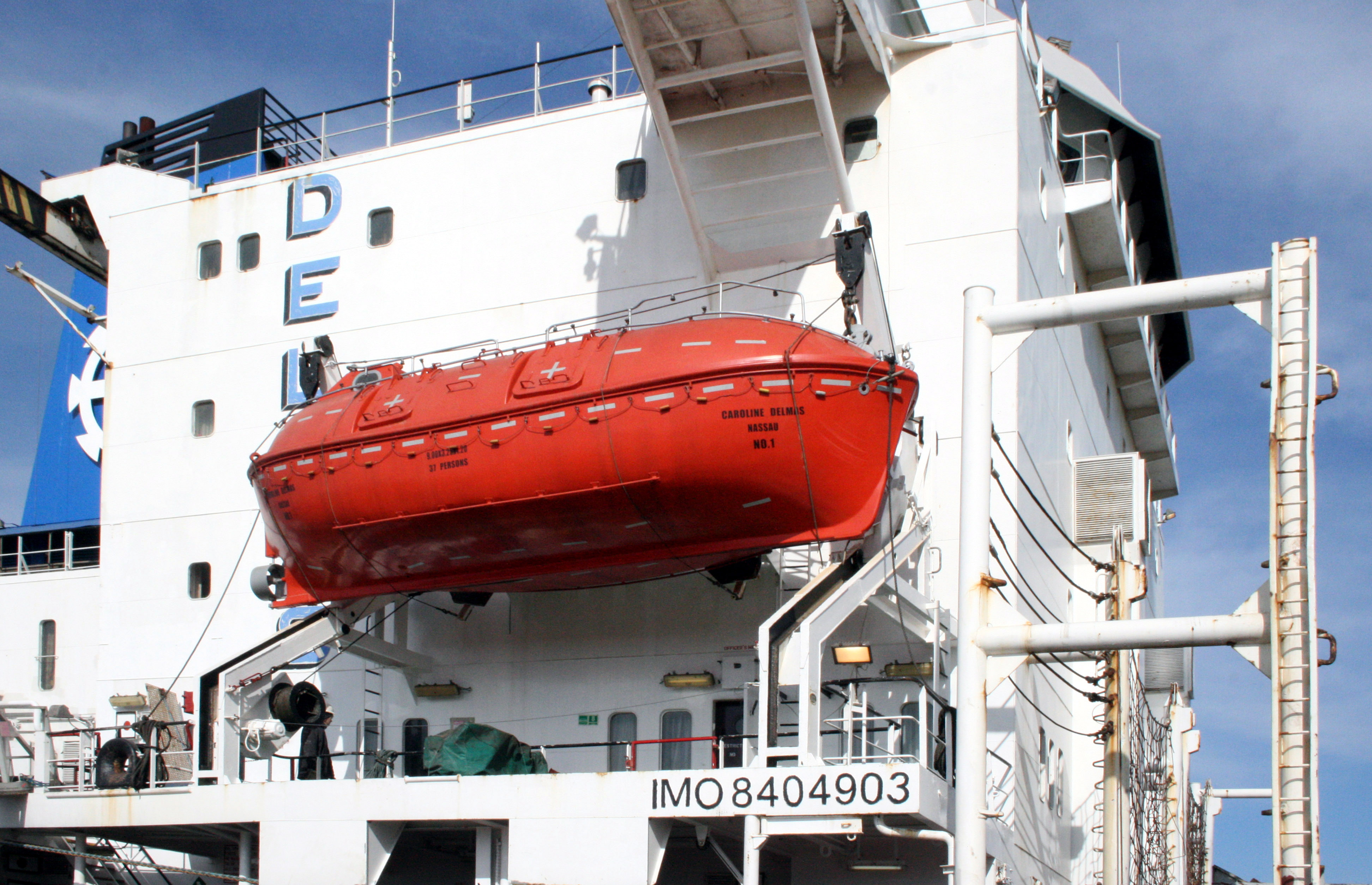
Modern fully enclosed lifeboat on Caroline Delmas. Note the small screw enclosed in a cowl to protect against injuries.

Liferafts in general are collapsible, and stored in a heavy-duty fiberglass canister, and also contain some high-pressure gas (in commercial models, usually compressed air) to allow automatic inflation to the operations size. SOLAS and military regulations require these to be sealed, never opened by the ship's crew; they are removed at set intervals (annually on merchant vessels) and sent to a certified facility to open and inspect the liferaft and contents. In contrast, a lifeboat is open, and regulations require a crew member to inspect it periodically and ensure all required equipment is present.

Modern lifeboats have a motor; liferafts usually do not. Large lifeboats use a davit or launching system (there might be multiple lifeboats on one), that requires a human to launch. Lifeboat launching takes longer and has higher risk of failure due to human factors. However lifeboats do not suffer from inflation system failures as inflatable liferafts do.

Since 2006 smaller self-rescue lifeboats have been introduced for use by boats with fewer people aboard: these are rigid dinghies with carbon dioxide-inflated exposure canopies and other safety equipment. Like the lifeboats used before the advent of the petrol engine, these self-rescue dinghies are designed to let the passengers propel themselves to safety by sailing or rowing. In addition to their use as proactive lifeboats, these self-rescue dinghies are also designed to function as unsinkable yacht tenders. An example of a self-rescue dinghy/lifeboat is the Portland Pudgy.

The International Convention for the Safety of Life at Sea (SOLAS) makes it a requirement for merchant ships to have liferafts on each side of the ship, sufficient for all the people on board (the stated capacity of the lifeboat, irrespective of the fact that there may actually be fewer people on board). However, if the lifeboats are "easily transferable" (i.e. have an open deck between port and starboard lifeboat decks), the number of liferafts may be reduced to a total sufficient for the ship's capacity.

The equipment carried in a liferaft is much less than a lifeboat. Unlike lifeboats, liferafts are not self-righting and have no motor.

Liferafts and lifeboats
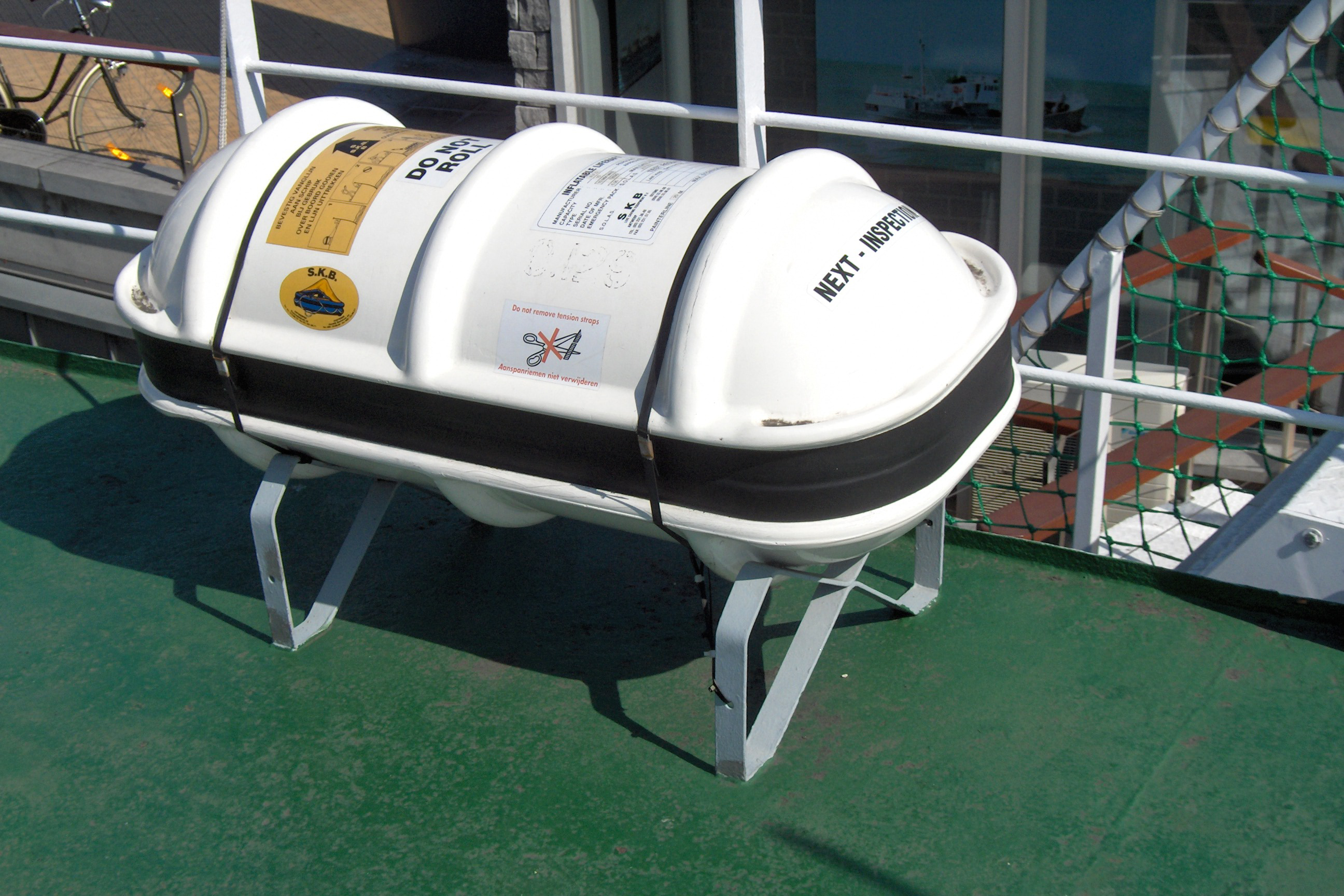
Inflatable liferaft in hard-shelled canister

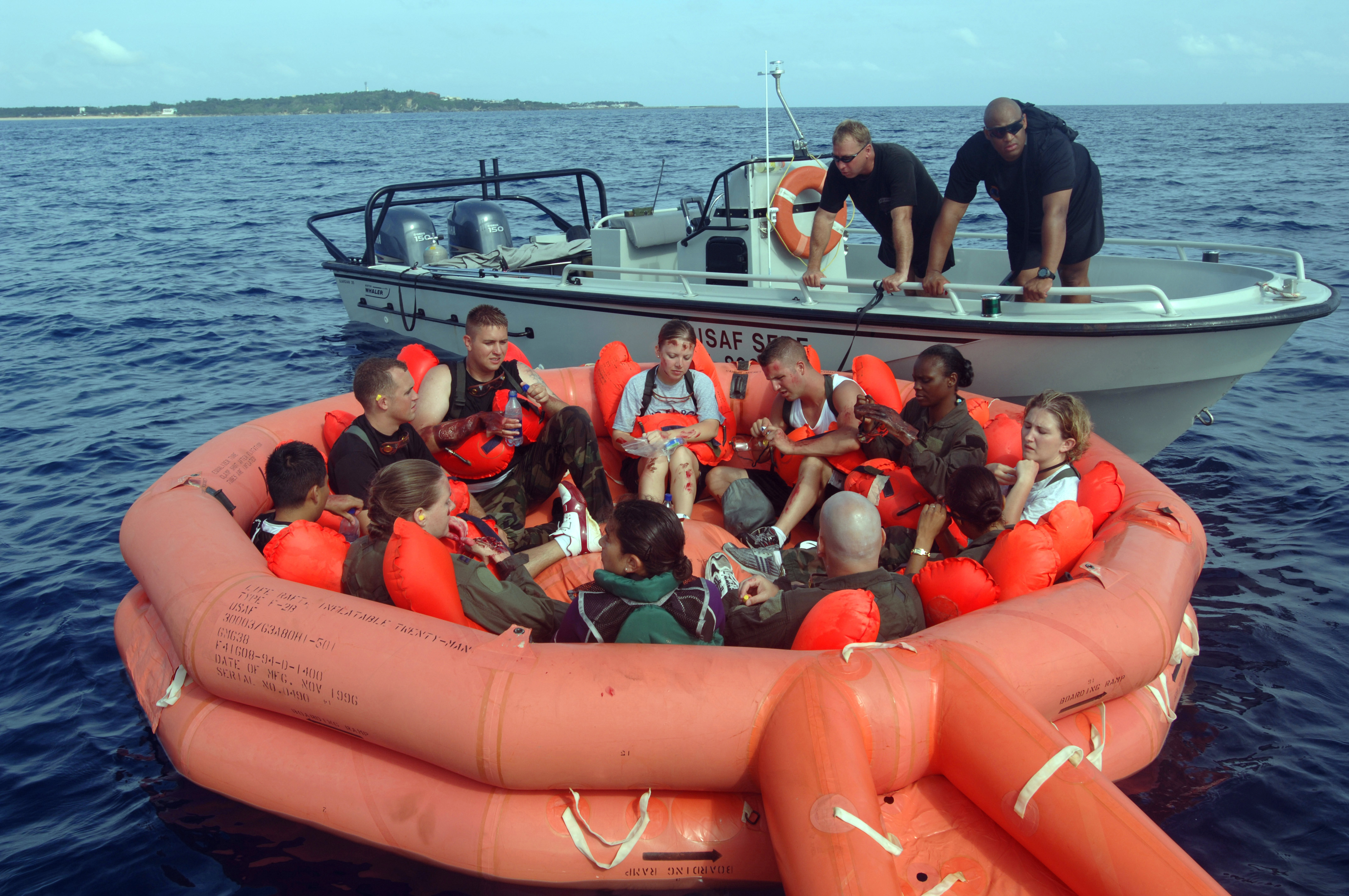
Open inflatable liferaft

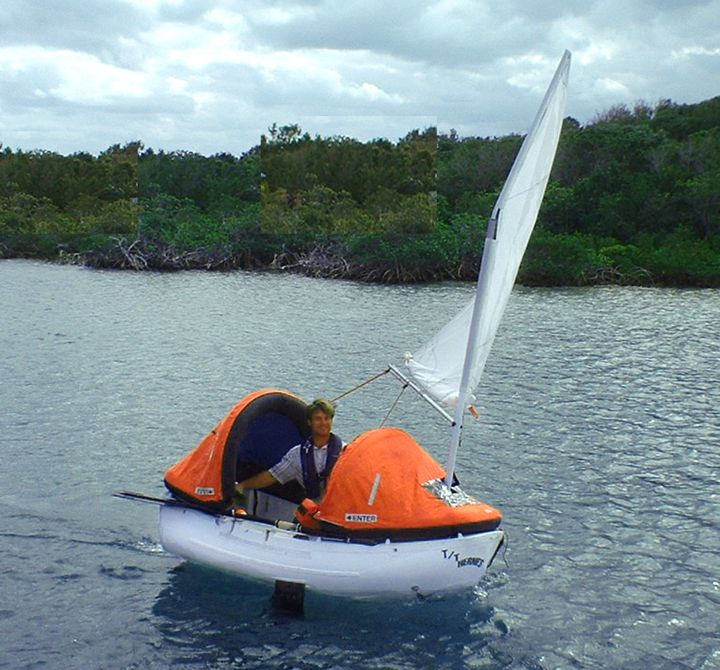
Proactive lifeboat, sailing. Note unzipped middle section of canopy and reefed sail.

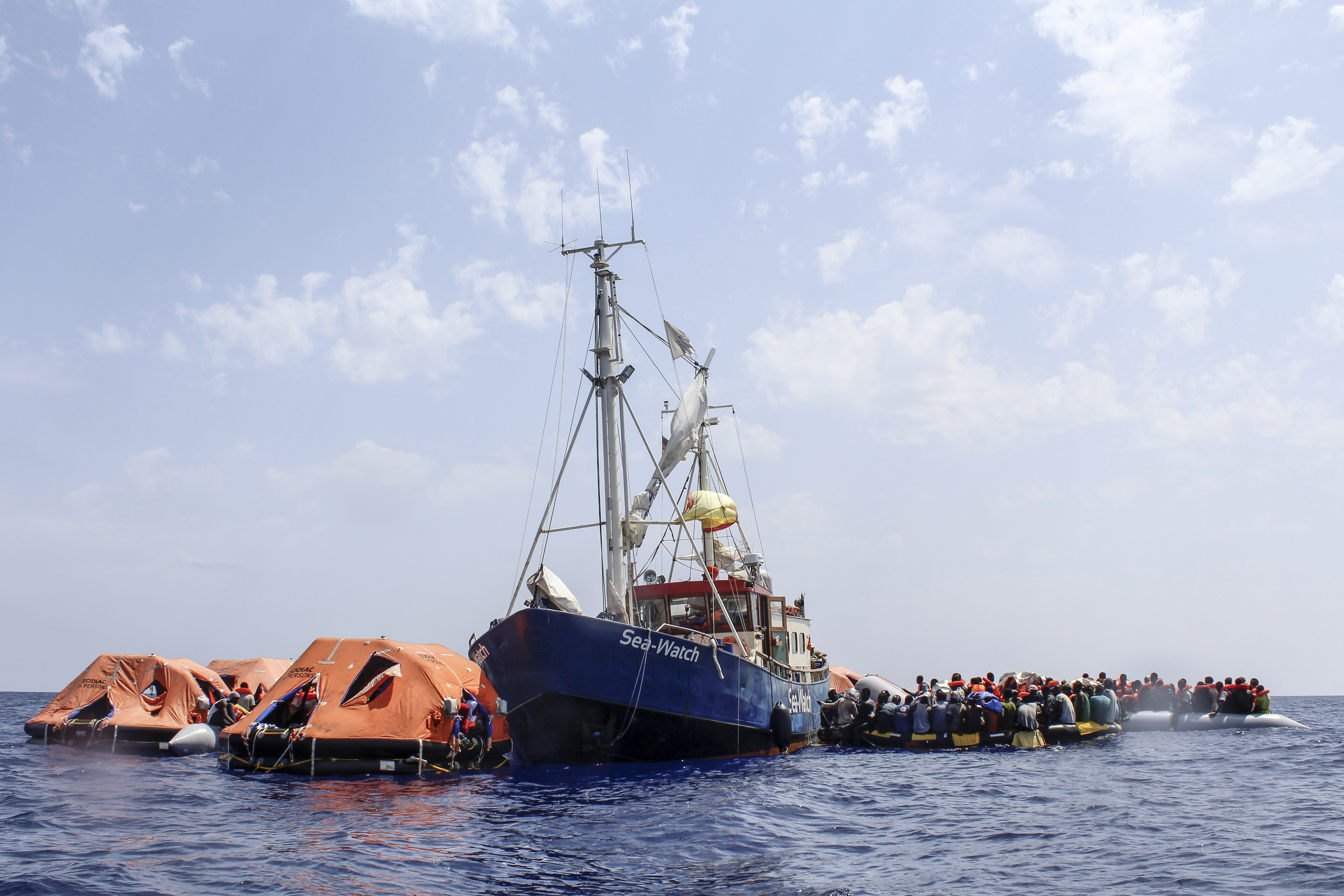
Sea Watch 2, of Sea-Watch, picking up refugees adrift on liferafts

== Specialized lifeboats ==
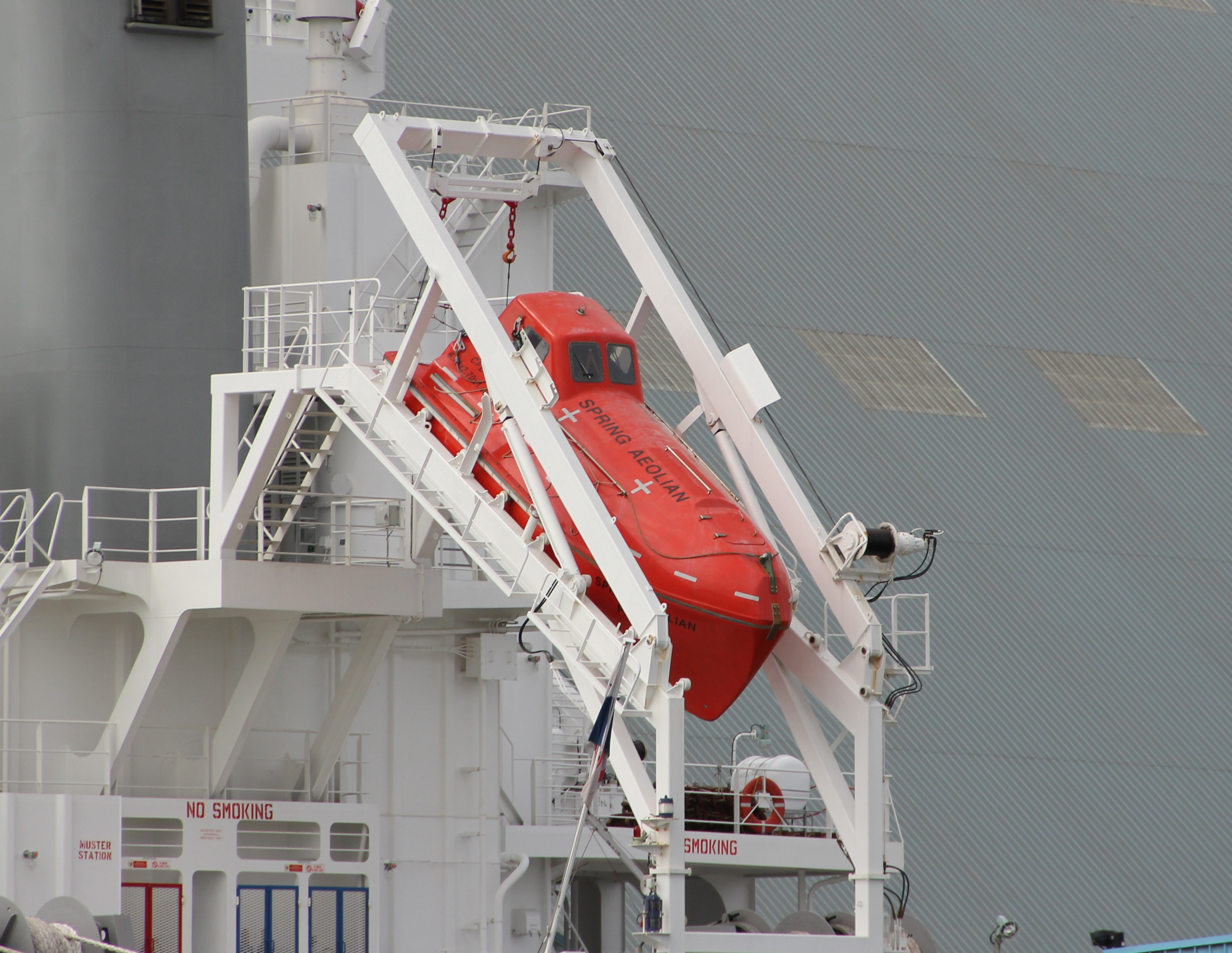
Freefall lifeboat of the Spring Aeolian

Some ships have a freefall lifeboat stored on a downward sloping slipway normally on the stern of the vessel. These freefall lifeboats drop into the water when the holdback is released. Such lifeboats are considerably heavier as they are strongly constructed to survive the impact with water. Freefall lifeboats are used for their capability to launch nearly instantly, and high reliability in any conditions. Since 2006 they have been required on bulk carriers that are in danger of sinking too rapidly for conventional lifeboats to be released. Seagoing oil rigs are also customarily equipped with this type of lifeboat.

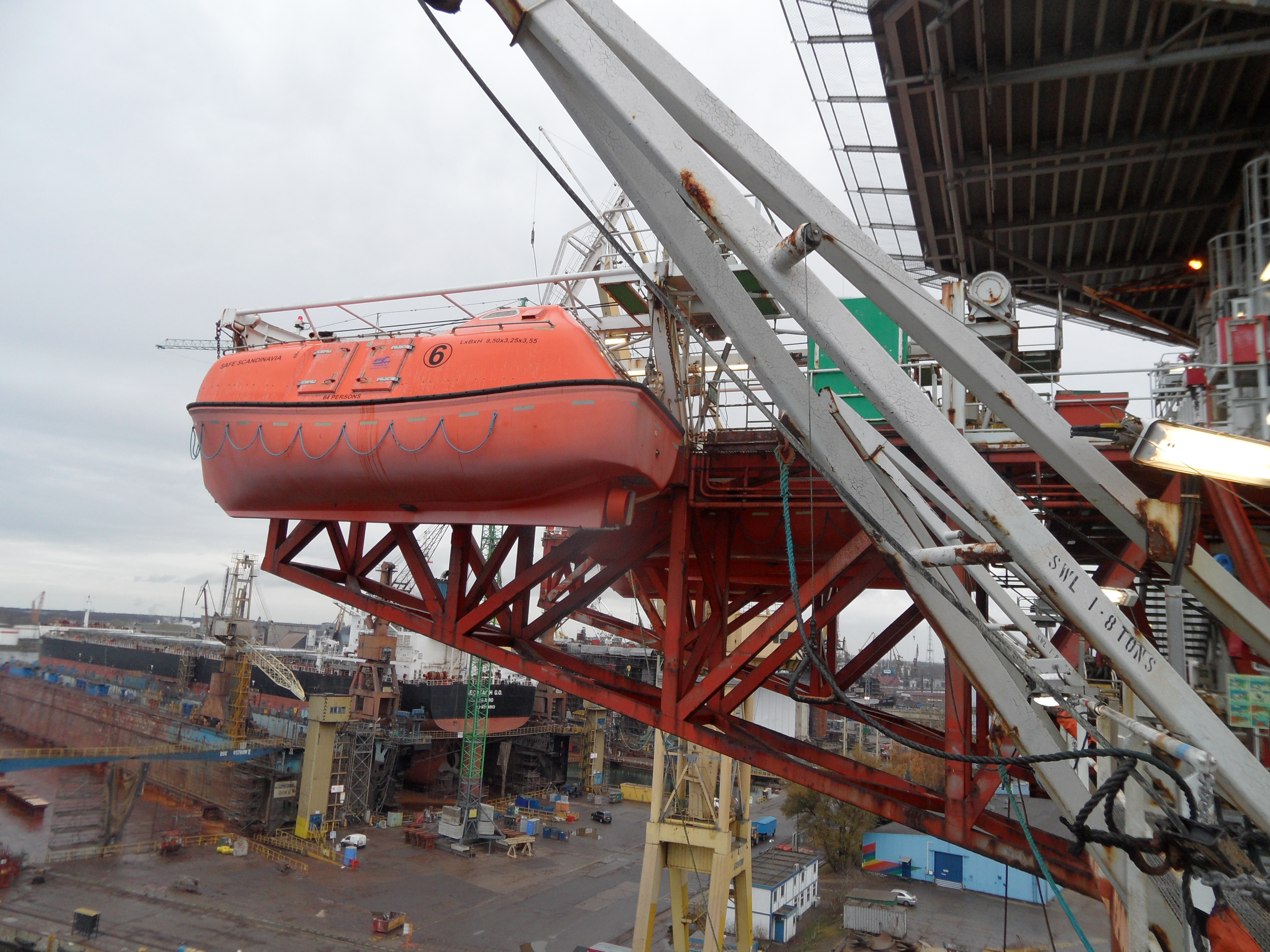
Lifeboat on oil rig

Tankers are required to carry fireproof lifeboats, tested to survive a flaming oil or petroleum product spill from the tanker. Fire protection of such boats is provided by insulation and a sprinkler system which has a pipe system on top, through which water is pumped and sprayed to cool the surface while the boat is driven clear of the flames. This system, while not failsafe against engine failure, allows fireproof lifeboats to be built of fiberglass.

Vessels that house saturation divers carry hyperbaric lifeboats which incorporate a hyperbaric chamber to allow the divers to escape without undergoing decompression.

== United States Navy liferafts ==
In the United States, the United States Coast Guard ensures the proper type and number of lifeboats are in good repair on large ships.

The United States Navy (USN) uses five types of custom inflatable liferafts as well as a number of commercially available Coast Guard approved liferafts. The 25-person MK-6 and MK-7 are used on surface ships, the 50-person MK-8 on aircraft carriers and LRU-13A and LRU-12A on aircraft and submarines respectively. Smaller combatant craft often use 6, 10 or 15-person commercial liferafts. The number of liferafts carried on USN ships is determined based on the maximum number of personnel carried aboard plus 10% as a safety margin. Aircraft carriers carry either 254 MK7 liferafts or 127 MK8 life rafts. While both are similar to heavy-duty commercial liferafts, USN liferafts use breathable air as the inflation gas rather than carbon dioxide to ensure full inflation within 30 seconds in Arctic environments.

Base material used on MK7 life rafts is polyurethane coated fabric which has very high durability. Old MK6 and a few MK8 life rafts are manufactured of neoprene-coated fabric, however, the majority of MK8 liferafts are also manufactured of polyurethane fabric. The lifeboat is compact and made of separate compartments, or "tubes", as a redundancy against puncture. Two air cylinders containing dry, breathable compressed air provide initial inflation. Depending on the model liferaft, each cylinder may contain up to 5000 psi of compressed air. Each liferaft is equipped with an external, automatically actuated light beacon and internal lighting. Power is provided by lithium batteries.

USN liferafts are stowed in heavy-duty fiberglass canisters and can be launched manually or automatically should the ship begin to sink. Automatic launching and inflation is actuated by a change in pressure sensed by a hydrostatic release device should the ship begin to sink. A hand pump is provided to "top-off" pressure at night when temperatures drop and internal air pressure decreases. Relief valves are installed in each tube to prevent overpressure. Repairs to holes or rips up to six inches in length can be made using special sealing clamps. Occupants in USN liferafts are protected from wind, rain and sun by built-in canopies which automatically inflate. Hatches are sealable to prevent rain and seawater from entering the liferafts. Survival equipment includes: manual reverse osmosis desalinator (MROD), bottles of fresh water, individual food packets, fishing kit, signaling mirror, rocket and smoke flares, flashlight, spare sea anchor, first aid kit, paddles, spare batteries and bulbs, and aluminized mylar sheets ("space blankets") to aid in caring for victims of hypothermia.

USN inflatable liferafts are serviced every five years. Each liferaft is test inflated before repacking. The USN liferafts have a high reliability rate of inflation.

== Transatlantic crossings ==
The first 19th-century shipboard lifeboat to make a transatlantic crossing was the Red, White and Blue, which made the crossing in 38 days between New York City and Margate, England, with a two-man crew in 1866. In 1870 the yawl City of Ragusa became the second small lifeboat to cross the Atlantic Ocean, from Cork to Boston with a two-man crew, John Charles Buckley and Nikola Primorac (di Costa). They upgraded it with two masts and took advantage of favorable winds on the return journey.

== See also ==
- Airborne lifeboat
- Carley float
- Equipment of the United States Coast Guard
- Escape pod
- Lifeboat ethics - an ethical dilemma of resource distribution
- Lifeboats of the Titanic
- Marine evacuation system (MES)
- Poon Lim
- Royal National Lifeboat Institution
- Search and Rescue
- Steven Callahan
- Ship's tender
- Apollo XIII Lunar module
