= Frankston =

Frankston can refer to:

- Frankston, Victoria, a suburb of Melbourne, Australia
  - Frankston City, a local government area in the same city
  - Electoral district of Frankston, an electoral district in Victoria, Australia
  - Frankston railway station
  - Frankston Power Centre
- Frankston, Texas, a small town in eastern Texas
- Bob Frankston, co-creator of the first spreadsheet program, VisiCalc

== See also ==
- Frankton (disambiguation), various places worldwide
- Frankeston, a breed of cattle
