= Stowaway (disambiguation) =

A stowaway is someone who travels illegally on a vehicle.

Stowaway or Stowaways may also refer to:

== Films ==
- Stowaway (1932 film), an American romance film
- Stowaway (1936 film), starring Shirley Temple
- Stowaway (1978 film), a Soviet comedy film
- Stowaway (2001 film), directed by Clarence Fok
- Stowaway (2021 film), a science-fiction thriller film
- Stowaway (2022 film), a yacht thriller film
- The Stowaway (1922 film), a German silent comedy film
- The Stowaway (1958 film) or Le Passager clandestin, a French film starring Martine Carol and Karlheinz Böhm
- The Stowaway (1997 film) or De Verstekeling, a Dutch film
- The Stowaway (2014 film), a short based on the short story "The Cold Equations"

== Television episodes ==
- "Stowaway" (Fringe), 2011
- "Stowaway", a 1993 episode of Hurricanes
- "Stowaways" (Monsters Inside Me), 2010

== Literature ==
- "The Callistan Menace" (working title "Stowaway"), a 1940 short story by Isaac Asimov
- Stowaway (1961 novel), a novel by Lawrence Sargent Hall
- The Stowaway (2000 novel), a novel in the Roswell High series by Melinda Metz
- The Stowaway (2008 novel), the first novel in the Stone of Tymora series by R.A Salvatore
- Stowaways, 2026 novella by André Aciman

== Songs ==
- "Stowaway", a 1955 song by Barbara Lyon
- "The Stowaway", a track from Furiosa: A Mad Max Saga (soundtrack)
- "The Stowaway", a song from the 2003 animated film Sinbad: Legend of the Seven Seas
- "The Stowaway", a 2007 song by Yamit Mamo from the Doctor Who episode "Voyage of the Damned"

== Transportation ==
- Stowaway M5 and MS5, Moulton Bicycle models
- Stowaway, several models of Seahopper folding boats
