= Frankton (folding boat) =

The Frankton is a type of folding boat. The name is a reference to Operation Frankton.

== Design ==
Martin Walford conceived the concept of the Frankton in the late 1990s; Michael Howard then worked out the design. It was designed as a dinghy that is usable on rivers, lakes and open water. It should be usable as a tender, yet be foldable to be easily transportable.

== Features ==
Open, the Franklin is 3 m × 1.5 m × 0.69 m. It can hold three adults. It can be both rowed and sailed. Its hull design allows it to double as a life raft. In that case it has a flat deck that will allow two adults to sleep on it. The Franklin's hull has a W-shape, which supplies the dinghy with lateral resistance and also increases its stability.

== Folding ==
The hull folds in two steps. First, the coaming folds in: The bow and stern boards fold in, followed by the side coaming. Second, the ends fold over the centre part of the boat, creating a smaller box shape. The result is a bundle of approximately 5 by 5 by 3 feet.

== See also ==
- Other meanings of Frankton.
