= Quickboat =

The Quickboat is a folding boat, based on the flat-out-boat geometry. It is constructed using composites with high density foam cores.

The first boats were due for release to the public in mid-2013. Before release, the Quickboat was expected to weigh around 50 kg, seat four people, and to have a capacity for up to a 9.8 hp engine providing it with top speeds in excess of 20 knots.

In November 2012, Quickboats launched a crowd-funding campaign on Indiegogo, and within 26 hours had already reached their goal. By the end of the campaign, the company had secured over $65,000 in funding with investors from 44 different countries.

In 2012 Quickboat Holdings Ltd acquired all of the initial technology for Quickboats from Quickstep Holdings Ltd, a public aerospace company specializing in advanced composite manufacturing and technology development.

The simple five-piece click together assembly process and one minute assembly time is intended to do more than just please recreational boaters. The company is in engaged in talks with aid organizations and government agencies to use the boats in "first response" rescue efforts in floods and other disasters. However, its creators say it is only suitable for use in bays, rivers or lakes and not for ocean travel, channel crossings or commercial fishing.

== Specifications ==
Length: 3.7m

Beam: 1.7m max.

Folded hull weight: 36kg

Assembled boat: 54kg

Rated hp: 10hp

Maximum transom weight: 28kg

Person capacity: 4 adults

Folded length: 3.64m

Folded width: 0.70m

Folded height: 0.13m
