= TEMPSC =

Acronym for "Totally Enclosed Motor Propelled Survival Craft"

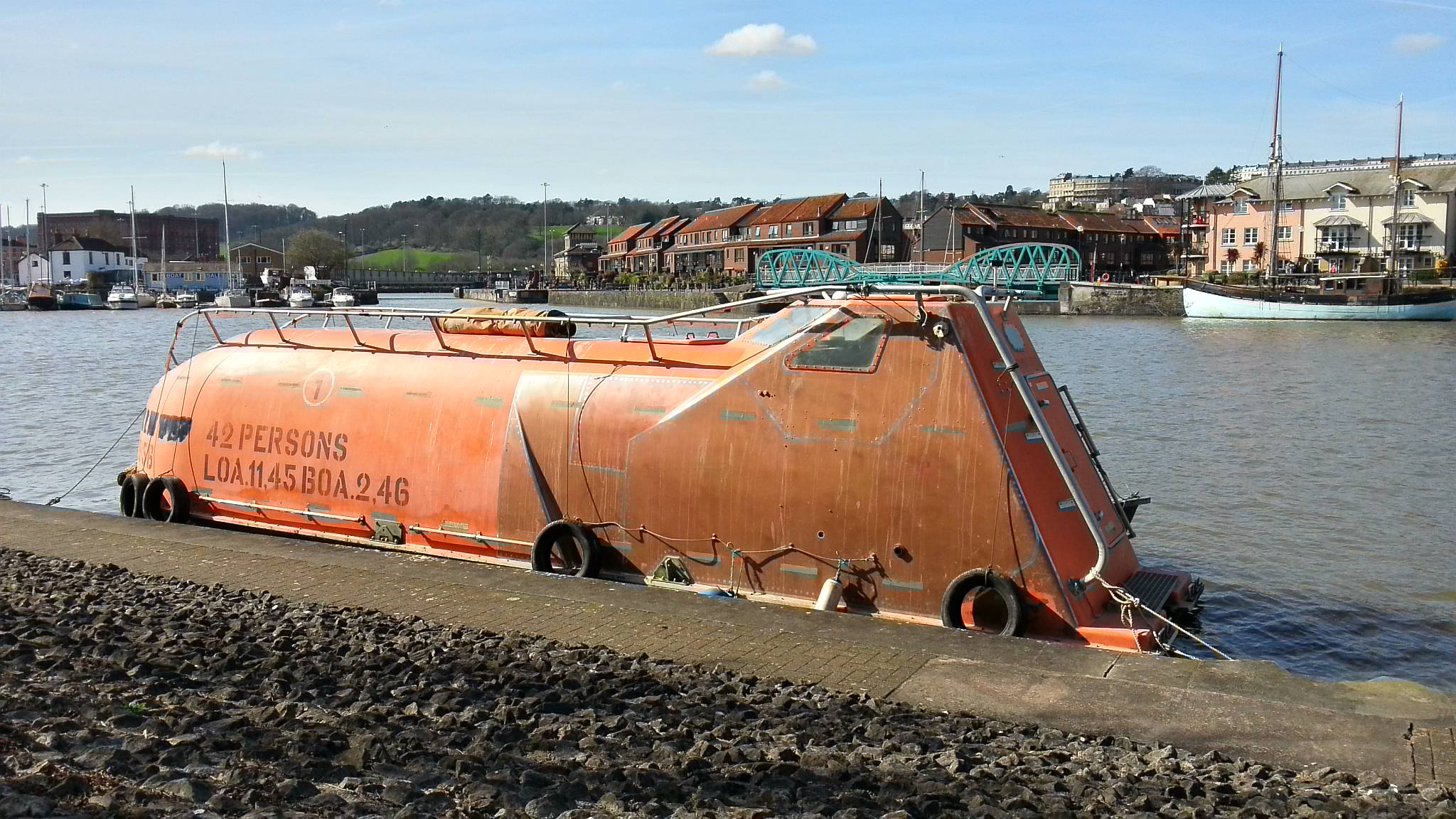
TEMPSC Lifeboat in Bristol harbour, England

TEMPSC is an acronym for "Totally Enclosed Motor Propelled Survival Craft", which was originally designed for offshore oil and gas platforms in 1968. The first-ever TEMPSC was spherical in shape, had a flat bottom, a single hook, with a total passenger capacity of 28 passengers and a fire-retardant fibreglass hull and dome. It was manufactured in Beverly Hills, California, by the Brucker Life Sphere Company, owned by its creator, Mr. Milton Brucker. The first TEMPSC was called the Brucker Life Sphere, but was later referenced as a "Totally Enclosed, Motor Propelled Survival Capsule".

The United States Coast Guard coined the acronym "TEMPSC" during the process of evaluating the Brucker Life Sphere for approval and adherence to SOLAS 1960. At that time, TEMPSCs did not exist and the IMO SOLAS description of a lifeboat was that of an open dual hook lifeboat that were only installed on board ships. The USCG's approval of the Brucker Life Sphere formalized the acronym to TEMPSC (Totally Enclosed Motor Propelled Survival Craft) and submitted it to IMO as a proposed amendment to the SOLAS 1974 convention. This proposed amendment added the TEMPSC design characteristics to the SOLAS rules. (Note: Totally Enclosed Lifeboats did not become a requirement until the SOLAS1983, Chapter III amendment, which made TEMPSC required on merchant vessels, tankers, MODUs, Floating Offshore Oil and Gas Platforms and some fixed platforms built on or after 1 January 1986. This amendment also required the TEMPSC to have an On-Load Release Gear mechanism(s) or hook(s), which allows the lifeboat to be capable of opening the hook while under load or suspended from the winch cable prior to becoming waterborne.)

Although the original TEMPSC was a single hook capsule exclusively designed for use on offshore oil and gas platforms, the SOLAS 1983, chapter III amendment forced all lifeboat manufacturers to change their open lifeboat designs to a TEMPSC. As a result, currently all TEMPCs (with one or two hooks) are commonly known as lifeboats or survival capsules.

TEMPSCs are typically installed on seagoing container vessels, tankers, fixed offshore oil and gas production platforms, floating installations (Floating Production Storage and Offloading), TLP (Tension Leg Platform), SPAR, MODU (Movable Offshore Drilling Units) and drill ships.

In the event of an emergency that requires evacuation of the offshore installation, TEMPSC are relied upon for mass evacuation of all personnel on board. TEMPSC are considered the primary method of evacuation during an emergency situation that requires evacuation of the facility due to catastrophic conditions where evacuation by helicopter, standby vessel or a catwalk to an adjacent platform is not possible. Evacuations could be a delayed onset, where the personnel have ample time to evacuate the facility. An immediate onset is an emergency situation that requires immediate evacuation due to extreme fire, explosion, gas release, severe weather, etc. In all of these cases, the offshore workers can deploy the TEMPSC into the sea and maneuver away from the platform or danger area and call for help from a nearby platform or emergency response vessel or coast guard.

There are three types of totally enclosed motor propelled survival crafts. They include: single hook and single cable launched survival capsule (originated from the original Brucker Life Sphere) includes capacities from 14 to 80 passengers; twin fall lifeboat (32-100 personnel) and free fall lifeboat (30-70 personnel).

== See also ==
- Oil platform
- Lifeboat (shipboard)
