= Shellbend =

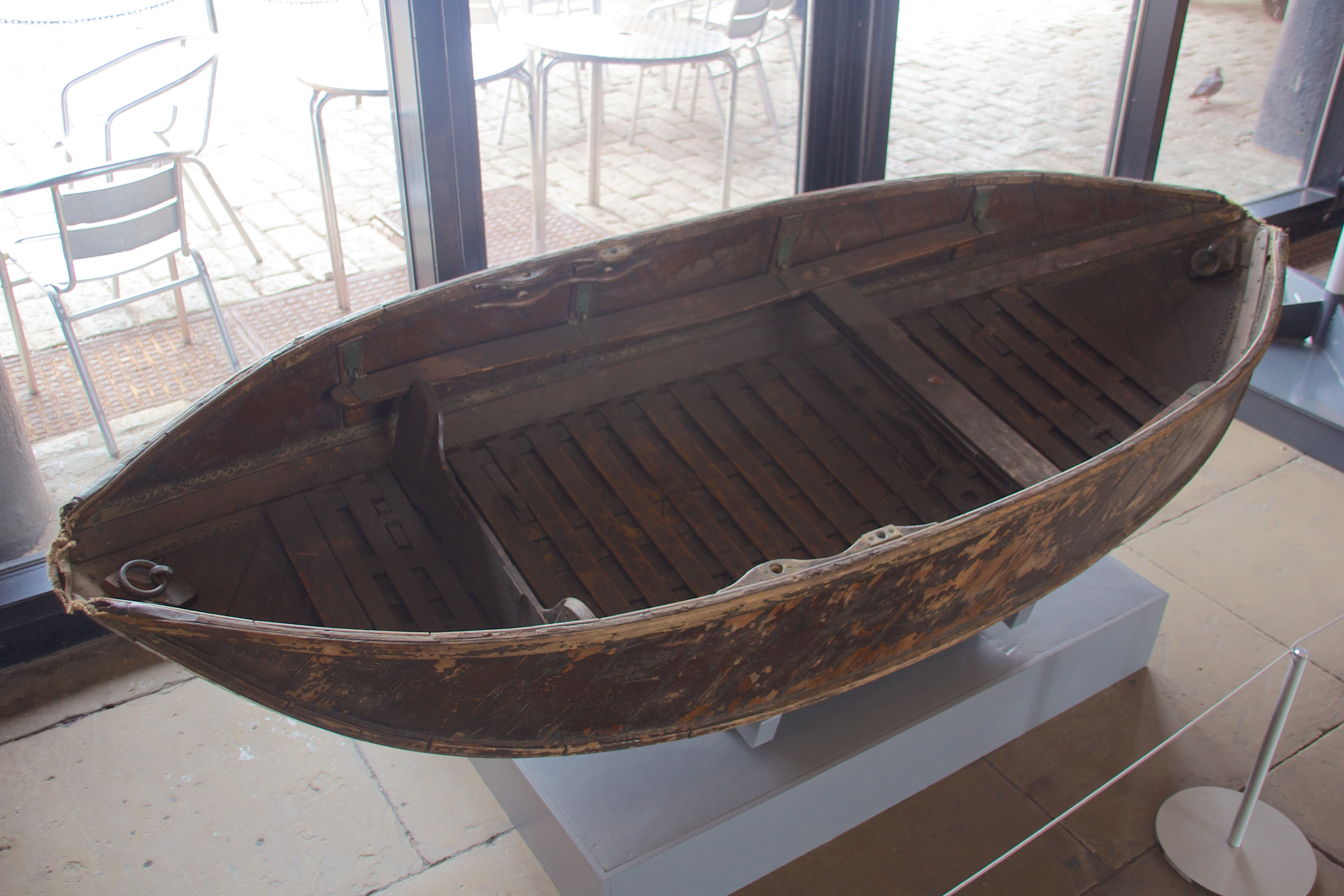
Shellbend folding boat, c1900, in the Merseyside Maritime Museum

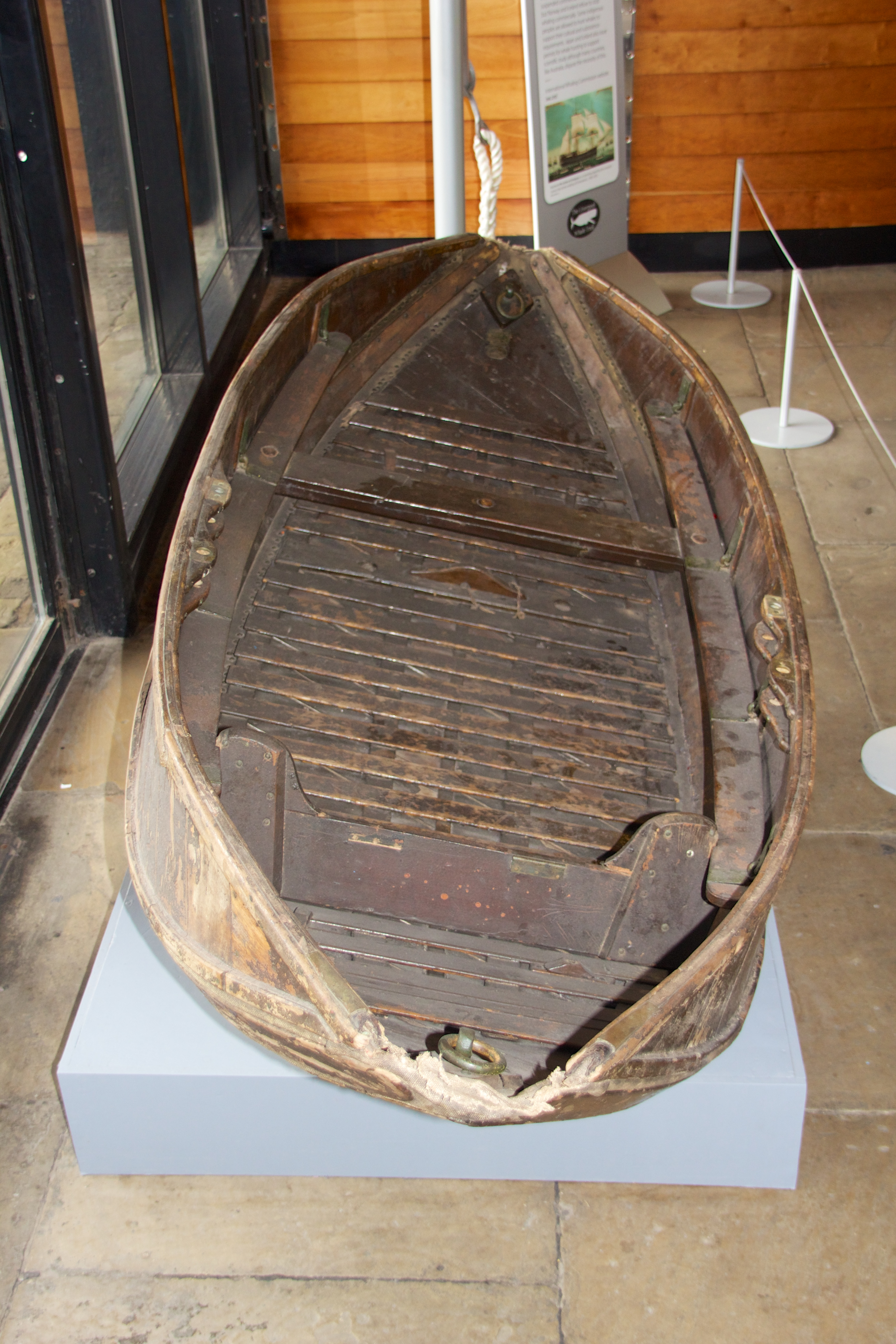

The Shellbend is a wooden folding boat, designed in the late 19th century by the Liverpool architect and civil engineer Mellard Treleaven Reade. It is constructed out of mahogany panels, which fold using canvas hinges to a fifth of the boat's original size. The intent was to create a lightweight collapsible boat, lighter than a solid-hull boat, to be used as a ship's tender.

Treleaven Reade's company, the Shellbend Folding Boat Company of Liverpool, offered the Shellbend from the late 1890s, though most of the boats were actually built by W. Roberts and Co. of Chester.

Mellard Treleaven Reade read before the Liverpool Engineering Society in 1899 a paper entitled Some Properties of Flexible Surfaces and Flexible Solids, Noted chiefly in Designing The Shellbend Folding Boat. This was published in their proceedings and was awarded the Derby Gold Medal.
