= InstaBoat =

The InstaBoat is a portable, aluminium folding boat. It first came onto the market in 1978, and has undergone many changes over the years.
