= Frankton =

Frankton may refer to:

== Places ==
=== Australia ===
- Frankton, South Australia

=== England ===
- English Frankton, Shropshire
- Frankton, Warwickshire
- Lower Frankton, Shropshire; a UK location
- Welsh Frankton, Shropshire; a settlement in Ellesmere Rural

=== New Zealand ===
- Frankton, Hamilton, in the North Island
- Frankton, Otago, in the South Island

=== United States ===
- Frankton, Indiana
- Frankton, Kansas

== Other uses ==
- Operation Frankton a commando raid on shipping in the German-occupied French port of Bordeaux during the Second World War
- Frankton (folding boat)

== See also ==
- Frankston (disambiguation)
