= Porta-bote =

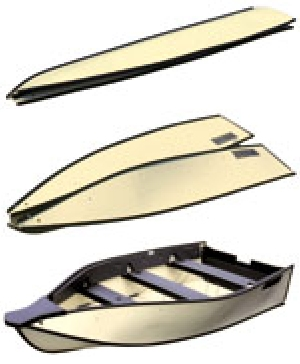

A portaboat (also foldaboat, foldboat, folding boat, Porta-Boot, or porta-bote) is a type of small recreational boat that folds to flat for storage and transport. The Portaboat was originally invented in 1971. It became popular in the 1980s and 1990s, when many boating and fishing enthusiasts started downsizing to condominiums and apartments without storage room for an ordinary boat.

== See also ==
- Folding boat
- Folding kayak
