= Frankeston =

Breed of cattle

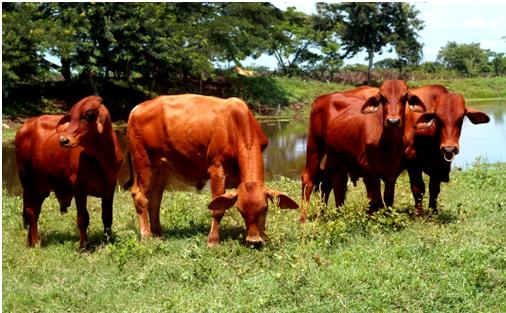

The Frankeston Red is a genetically improved bovine cattle, its creation focus was for it to be a dual-purpose cattle to be used as both dairy and beef cattle.

== History of the breed ==
The Frankeston Red is the first breed of cattle in the world created in the 21st Century by the scientist director of the Frankeston project, Dr. Francisco A. Restom Bitar; a specialist in human and animal genetics, and his team at the Bovine Genetic Experimental Center Remanso Caribe (Centro de Experimentación Genética Bovina Remanso Caribe in Spanish) located in the municipality of Arjona, Colombia, in the vicinity of Cartagena de Indias.

Restom started his genetic experiments in the middle of the year 1984, combining strategic and orderly in vivo chromosomes the native races x Cebu with semen of purebreds and their subsequent mating inter se to create the Frankeston breed, a cattle race biologically adapted for adverse conditions of the warm tropics, capable of producing more milk and more meat (dual purpose), surpassing not only the performance of every other breed, but also of crossed foreign cattle throughout the Caribbean region.

The scientist published his work during the first quarter of 2001 and the breed was officially introduced by the end of 2003 in the III Scientific Convention of the University of Cartagena, an institution that through a cooperation agreement evaluated in situ the last 3 years of research and endorsed the results of the work done with the breed.

This breed was born from a desperate search for a sustainable and profitable solution to the repeated failure of foreign cattle to produce properly in the region due to the environmental conditions of the tropics, and their indiscriminate use in crosses carried out without control, without order, goals, or scientific studies throughout history.

It is a new biotype of dual-purpose bovine (milk and meat), more efficient and biologically resistant to heat, high solar radiation, and tropical diseases. A breed created to lessen the ecological and economic cost that has represented Colombia's needs to import genetic material, incalculable losses due to productivity, and progressive deterioration of farmers in the society.

The work has also been successfully submitted in other conventions such as the First Congress and V Scientific Convention of the University of Panama (2004), and III International Congress and IV National Congress of Human Genetics at Universidad del Norte in Barranquilla, Colombia (2004).

The creation of the Frankeston breed has been a long and complex work and has required the application of the scientific method, mathematics, planning, and execution. All of them adjusted to the principles and laws of genetics.

== Methodology ==
In each of the stages of crosses to achieve genetic recombination that gave rise to the F1, F2, F3 and F4 and following, the scientist carried out biometric analysis, he confronted the development and general biological behavior of animals, and verified that the best genes of adaptation, milk and meat production, were inheriting from the different races and through gene interaction of them, had created the prototype which was planned based on the best phenotypic features of its predecessors, constituting, finally, the Frankeston race.

Once the prototype was obtained, the scientist proceeded to do successive chromosomal recombination inter se, in other words, to mate female and male Frankeston to form the F5, F6, etc.

That way the new breed consolidated the traits pursued throughout the investigation, indicating that the genes have been set by the phenomenon of interbreeding that allowed a genetic linkage resulting in the creation of the new breed Frankeston.

== Racial pattern ==
In the coat or fur of the race is the predominant red colour

(95%). This allows filtering UV rays protecting the animal of solar erythema. It is covered by hair very short and fine, a quality of cattle adapted to the tropics. Dewlap of regular size, wrinkled and gently attached. Hump of medium size in the bulls and superficial in females. Height at wither medium. Body enlarged with fine bones, compact and balanced. Its dorsal line is straight and strong. Good thoracic depth. Very good limbs, provided with strong, high, and pigmented hooves, very suitable to withstand humidity and long journeys.

The sire is very vigorous, masculine, and very sexually active. Testicles are very well shaped and of good size. And the cow's mammary system has a glandular udder, good size, quite firm and well irrigated.

== Productive advantages ==
The females have in their first lactation good productions improving in the second the average of the average of 2,580 kg. per lactation in 313 days as one of the breed's trait is high productive periods.

These productions are 338% above the regional milk production, and +28% in meat production, surpassing not only the performance of the other breeds, but also to all crossings with foreign cattle that are milked in the Caribbean region.

The production of this race is clean, organic, obtained in the regime of foraging tropical pastures and managed without the administration of hormones, animal waste products, or antibiotics.

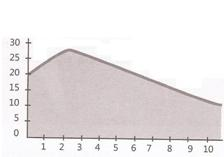
Milk production curve

It also responds generously when the environmental conditions involved in production and reproduction are improved. Cows that are daughters of Frankeston bulls by natural mating have produced up to 28.1 kg. of milk a day and over 4.800 kg. per lactation, and many of the males come to increase about 1.000 grams of weight a day when they are given the right nutritional and handling conditions to not limit them their potential.

The prediction of the total milk production of cows of the Frankeston breed in the second and third delivery through the registry of performance at the peak of lactation, yields for this breed a total estimated production of 6.750 kg in a lactation of 313 days for a peak of 28 kg./day and 6000 kg. to a peak of 25 kg./day.(Factor 0.416 was used for this breed).

The peak presented itself between 50 and 75 days after delivery. More information about these investigations can be found in the work "Dual purpose livestock of the XXI Century in the tropics".

Female Frankeston show more fertility, its productive longevity and durability are one of its many enhanced traits, making it common to find calves whose grandmothers have exceeded 14 calves in their productive life.

=== Other characteristics ===
In addition to dams with good productive potential in their environment, and good growth rate of calves at weaning and post-weaning, other traits of this breed that highlight further advantages in the overall productivity in the warm tropics are:

- Calving ease
- Good birth rate
- Strength and foraging ability
- Maternal ability and viability
- Solar Erythema, photosensitisation, and cancer resistance
- Tolerance to Boophilus microplus tick and other internal and external parasites
- Rigorous control of lethal and semilethal genes
- Resistance to tropical diseases
- Excellent type and conformation
- Docility and tameness
- Low maintenance cost.

Also, Frankeston bulls are chosen to be mated with different crossed cows f1 because it maintains the levels of hybrid vigor retained in future generations. It also prevent the harmful increase (%) in inheritance of Bos Taurus or Bos Indicus genes; and because it can improve production in the new generations f2, f3, etc.

== See also ==
- Genetic Engineering
- Genetically modified organism
- Raza bovina criolla Sanmartinero
