= Seahopper =

English brand of wooden folding boats

Hull Length	Hull Weight
6 ft 8 in (2.03 m)	48 lb (22 kg)
7 ft 10 in (2.39 m)	53 lb (24 kg)
10 ft (3.0 m)	75 lb (34 kg)

Seahopper is a brand of wooden folding boats, built in Wellington, Somerset, England. Since 1974, more than 7000 Seahoppers have been built in this yard. Seahoppers are built from plywood, with a PVC membrane.

== History ==
The Seahopper was developed in the 1970s by Geoff Lennard. Approximately a decade later, Lennard sold the business to Steve Rea. Initially, the yard only constructed the two smaller models. However, in 1997, at the request of Mark Walters, a larger dinghy similar to the Mirror was developed, which became known as the Kontender. For a period of time, Rea and Walters collaborated in the building, promoting, and selling of the three models of Seahoppers. Eventually, the collaboration led to the formation of two separate companies: Seahopper and Stowaway. While Stowaway initially produced similar copies of the Seahoppers, further development eventually led to more distinct designs.

== Construction ==
The hull of a Seahopper is built from 5mm-thick plywood. A sturdy PVC membrane allows it to fold, while keeping the water out. To unfold it into a boat one slots in the thwarts, the seats and the transom.

Seahoppers are centreboard prams, characterized by their centerboard and skeg, which provide directional stability. Additionally, the skeg features a skeg wheel, facilitating movement and launching of the boat without the need for carrying or using a launching trolley. The transom bow is defined by the membrane, indicating that the boat is a folding boat; internally, a transom is inserted to provide rigidity. The transom stern consists of two flaps on the inside and the membrane on the outside. A bracket can be added to this transom to attach a rudder, an outboard motor, or both.

== Models ==
Seahoppers exist in three models:

=== Scamp ===
This is the smallest model Seahopper at 6 feet 8 inches (2.03 m). It was promoted as SeaScamp between 1997 and 2000, after which period it became the Crafty Scamp At the start of 2017 it got its current name. The base model can be used as a rowing boat or with an additional outboard bracket it can be used as a motor boat with a small outboard. There are two sailing rigs available for the Scamp: It can either take a lug sail, or it can be sailed with a Holt rig with just a mainsail.

=== Lighter ===
The Lighter is currently the middle model at 7 feet 10 inches (2.39 m). Originally this was the largest model of two, the 7'10". With the introduction of the Kontender, it became the middle model, and was promoted as 7-tender or seven-tender, a pun on its length and it possible use as a tender. After that period it became the Nifty Fifty. At the start of 2017 it received its current name. Like the Scamp, it can be used as a rowing boat or a motorboat, and can be used with the two sailing rigs. But with the Holt Rig, the NF has the option to sail it cat rigged or bermuda rigged. That is, it can be sailed with the mast closer to the bow and using just a mainsail, like the Scamp, or with the mast further away from the bow and sail with mainsail and jib, like the Kondor.

=== Kondor ===
The Kondor is largest of the three Seahopper models, at 10 feet (3.0 m). It was first designed and launched in 1997, under the name Kontender, to contend with the Mirror. That name was later used for the Stowaway version of that model, which was slightly different, while the Seahopper version became the Kondor. Like the other two it can be rowed and can be used as a motorboat. For sailing, the Holt rig is available, used with main and jib. This is the normal rig for a boat of that size.

=== Stowaway models ===
The Stowaway models originally were the 20, the 24, and the Kontender; similar to respectively the Scamp, the Lighter and the Kondor. Later a smaller model, the 18 was added. Stowaway models can be told apart from original Seahoppers by their relatively wide keel piece, which measures over 5 inches (13 cm).

== Types ==
The base models are rowing boats, but each model is also available as a sailing boat. The Scamp can be sailed with just a Holt rig main sail, or with a lug sail. Similarly, the Lighter can be sailed with a Holt rig with just a main sail, or as a bermuda rig, or alternatively it can be used with a lug sail. The Kondor can only be sailed with a Holt rig as a Bermuda rig.

== See also ==
- Folding boat
