= PS Normandy =

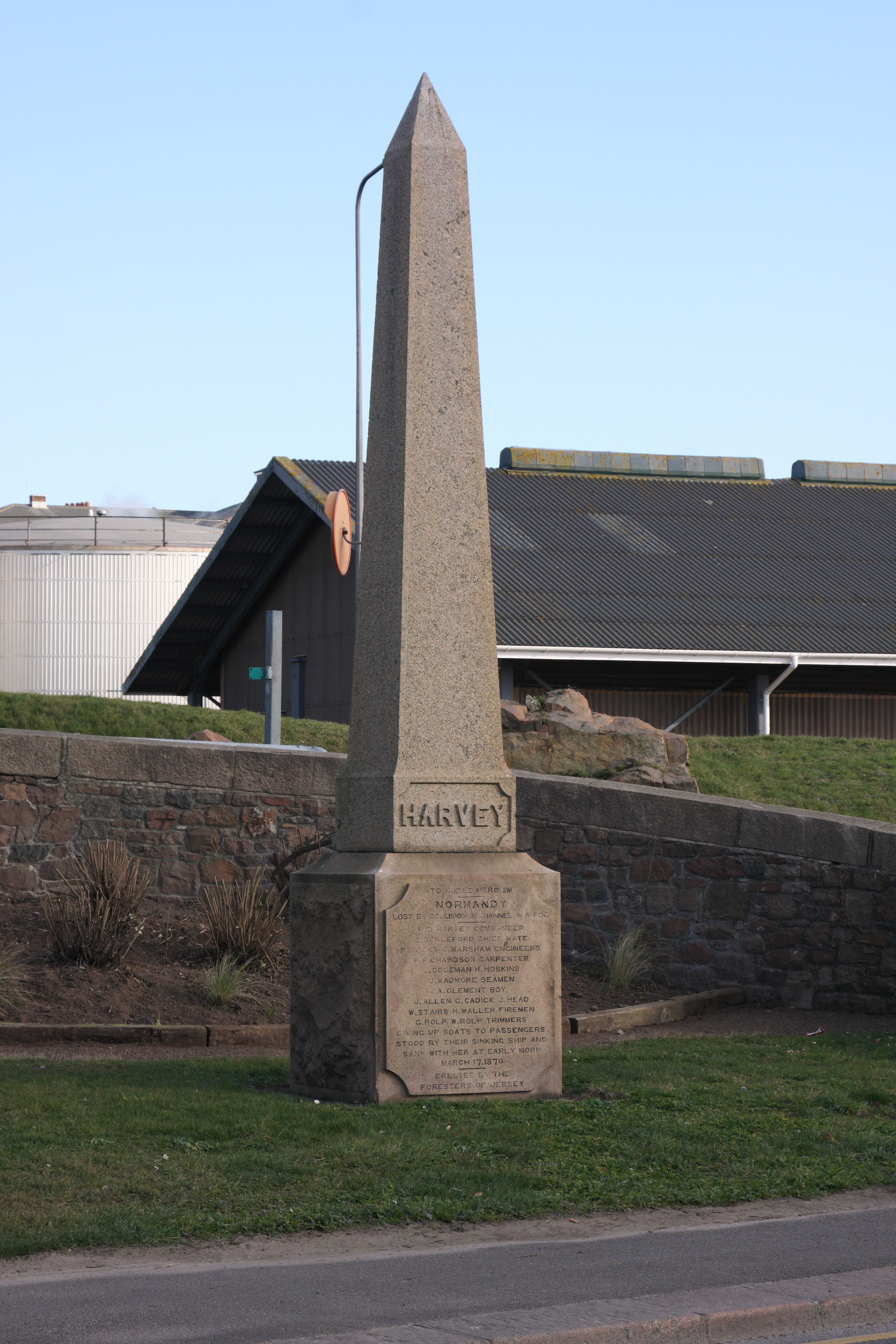
- Monument to Captain Harvey at La Collette, Saint Helier

History

United Kingdom
- Name: PS Normandy
- Operator: London and South Western Railway;
- Route: Southampton - Guernsey - Jersey
- Launched: ? ("built in 1863")
- Out of service: 1870
- Fate: Foundered on 17 March 1870

General characteristics
- Class & type: paddle-wheel mail-steamer
- Tonnage: 252 register; 425 full
- Length: 220 ft 0 in (67.06 m) s
- Beam: 25 ft 0 in (7.62 m) s
- Installed power: 238 ihp
- Propulsion: 34 revolutions per minute
- Speed: 14.75 knots

PS Normandy was a British paddle-wheel mail steamer operating on the Southampton - Guernsey - Jersey route which, on a night of dense fog, sank 20 miles from The Needles in the English Channel in the early morning of 17 March 1870 after colliding at around 03:30 with steamship Mary, a propeller steamer carrying 500 tons of maize from Odessa to London via Gibraltar.

The PS Normandy, built in 1863, was operated by the Steam Packet Company, at the time a subsidiary of the London and South-West Railway Co. On the night of 16 March 1870, she left Southampton for St. Peter Port, Guernsey, and then onwards to Jersey, being due there within twelve hours. The ship was operating under an agreement between the Steam Packet Company and the British government for the carriage of Her Majesty’s mail to the Channel Isles. The agreement stated that vessels undertaking this duty were to make ‘the best of their way’ on the run and stop only for ‘the saving of life’. Late arrival was penalised by a charge £50 an hour. Until the night of 16 – 17 March 1870, the PS Normandy had never defaulted on its contractual obligations.

On the bridge of the Mary at the time of the collision, were Mr Griggs, the first mate and the captain of the vessel, Captain Stranach, together with the helmsman.

== Incident summary ==
Normandy was captained by Captain Henry Beckford Harvey and carried 28 crewmen, including chief mate J. Ockleford, an experienced officer with more than 16 years in the employ of the Company, the stewardess, Mary Charlotte Wilson and 31 passengers, of which 12 were women.

The principal cause of the collision was that the Mary was covered by the edge of a dense bank of fog and was hidden from the view of the officers on the bridge of the Normandy which was, until the moment of the collision, under a clear sky. Mary was moving at less than 2 knots and was sounding her fog-horns, her crew conscious of the precariousness of the situation.

Just after 0339, the officers on both ships became aware of each other’s presence. It was, however, too late to change course and, despite the rapid and almost simultaneous orders issued by Mr Ockleford on the Normandy and Captain Stranach on the Mary, the Normandy passed in front of the Mary which connected with her side just astern of her starboard paddle wheel causing extensive damage and carrying off the starboard lifeboat. As the momentum of the two ships was lost, the Normandy immediately began to take on water.

After the collision, Captain Harvey ordered the two remaining portside lifeboats to be launched and ensured that all the women were placed on board first. There was no more room for those who remained onboard the Normandy.

One of the rescued passengers was later to comment, ‘The Captain behaved with the greatest coolness and judgement under such trying circumstances. All the gentlemen stood back and made no attempt to get into the boats until the ladies were in them. During the whole occurrence extraordinary order and quietness prevailed, and the greatest fortitude was shown. I last saw Captain Harvey on the bridge, giving orders for the management of the boats and engines.’

One lifeboat was launched from the Mary but did not reach the Normandy as Mr Andrews, the second mate of the Mary who was in command of the lifeboat sent to search for those left on the Normandy, did not continue for fear that the Mary herself was in danger of sinking.

Although the ruling of the official enquiry was that the Normandy was at fault, the actions and the heroism of Captain Harvey, who died after having ensured that the passengers would be first to abandon the ship, was strenuously defended and praised by Victor Hugo, who also recommended that London and South Western Railway equip its ships with watertight bulkheads, sufficient life jackets, and floating lights.

== Court ruling ==
The Greenwich Police Court judged on 11 April 1870 that Normandy was found to have infringed Articles 14 and 15 of the Regulations for Preventing Disasters at Sea and "noted with dissatisfaction" the conduct of the second mate of Mary for returning to Mary with a lifeboat without reaching Normandy.

== Monument in St. Helier ==
A monument to the crew of Normandy stands at Saint Helier on Jersey. The inscription on the monument reads:

Harvey

To noble heroism
Normandy
Lost by collision in Channel in a fog

H. B. Harvey - Commander
J. Ockleford - Chief Mate
R. Cocks C. Marsham - Engineers
P. Richardson - Carpenter
J. Coleman H. Hoskins
J. Wadmore - Seamen
A. Clement - Boy
J. Allen G. Cadick J. Head
W. Stairs H. Waller - Firemen
G. Rolp W. Rolp - Trimmers
Giving up boats to passengers
stood by their sinking ship and
sank with her at early morn
March 17.1870
Erected by the
Foresters of Jersey
