= Folding boat =

Smaller boat that can be folded for packing

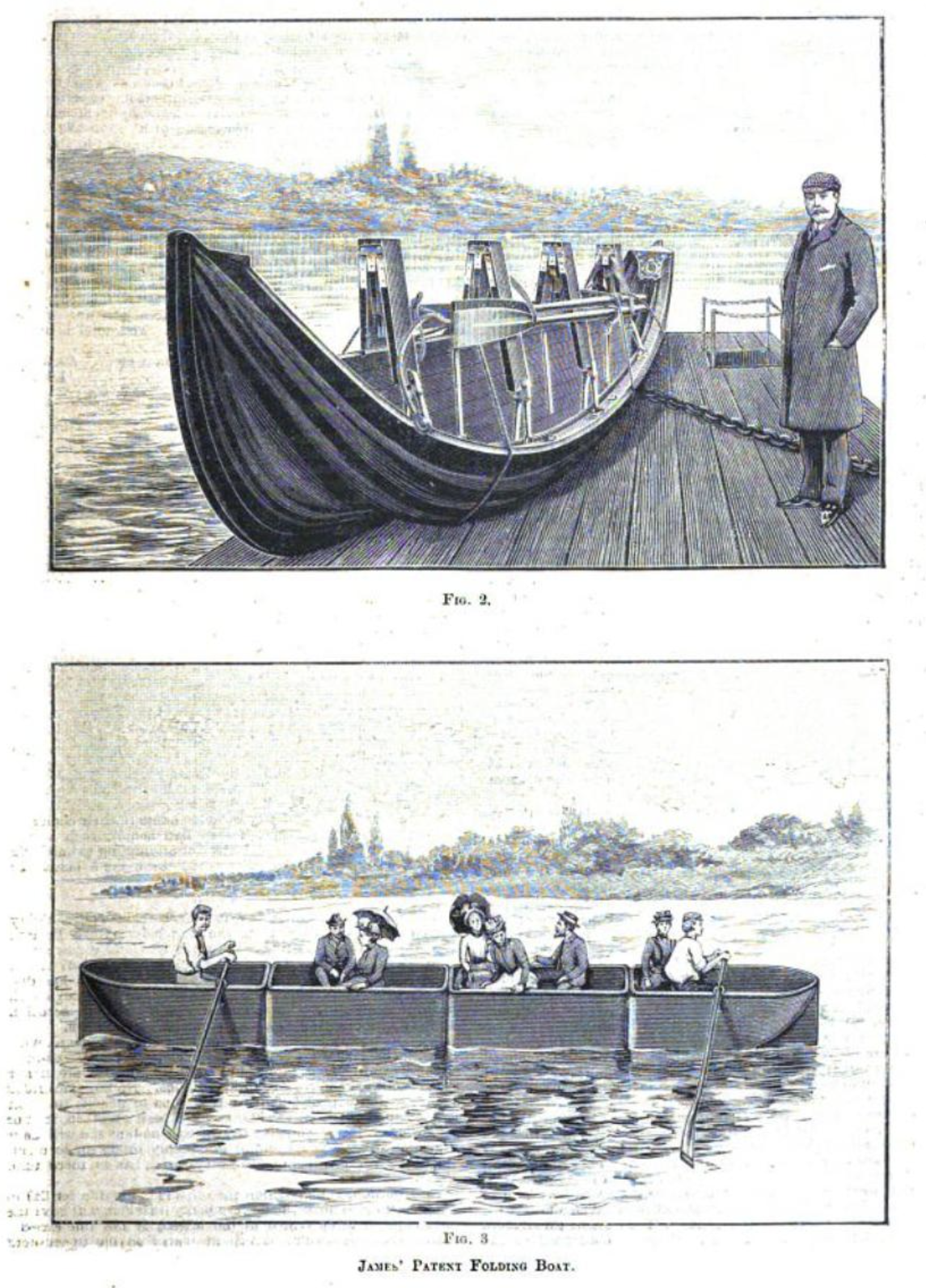
James' Folding Boat (1901)

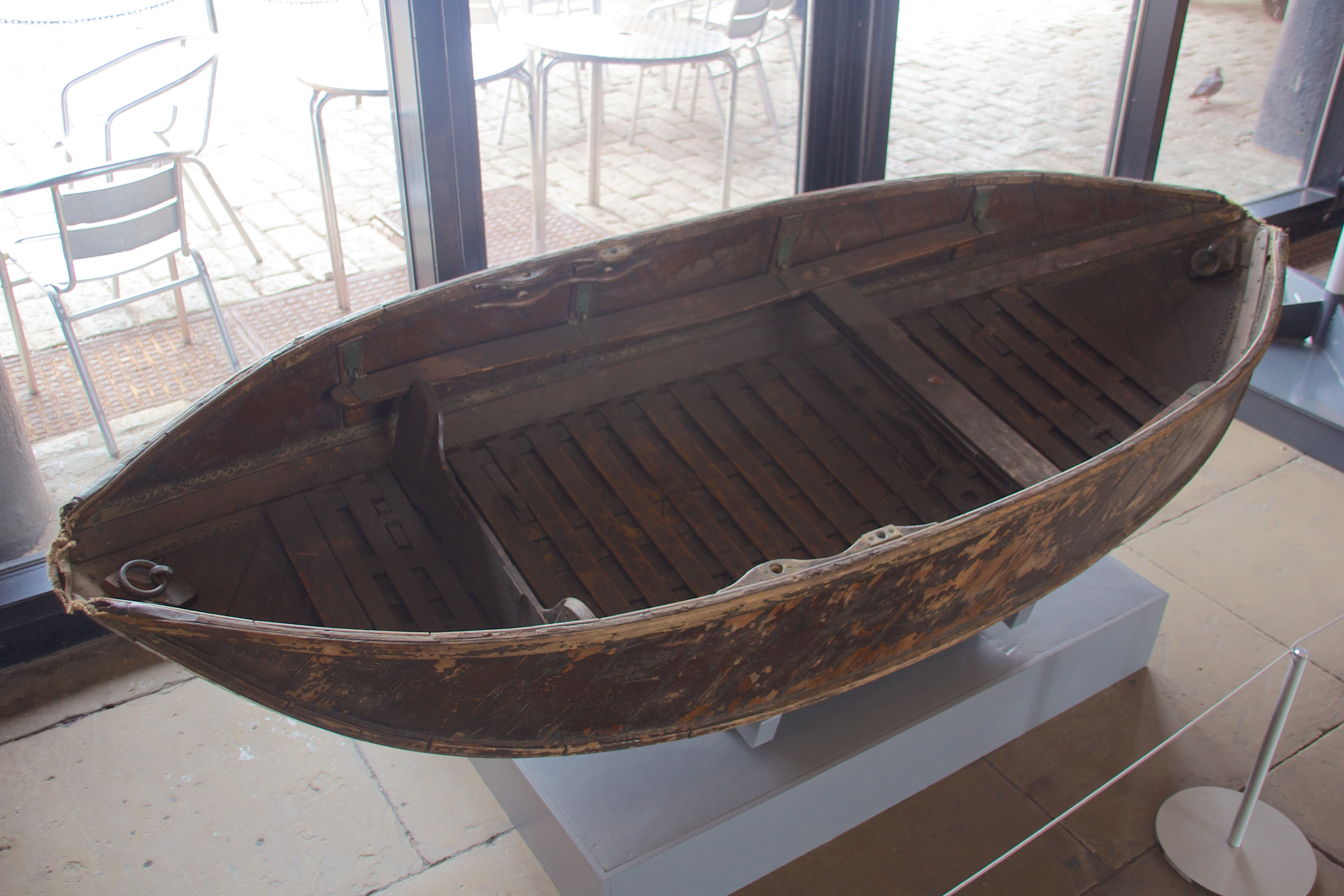
A Shellbend folding boat, at the Merseyside Maritime Museum.

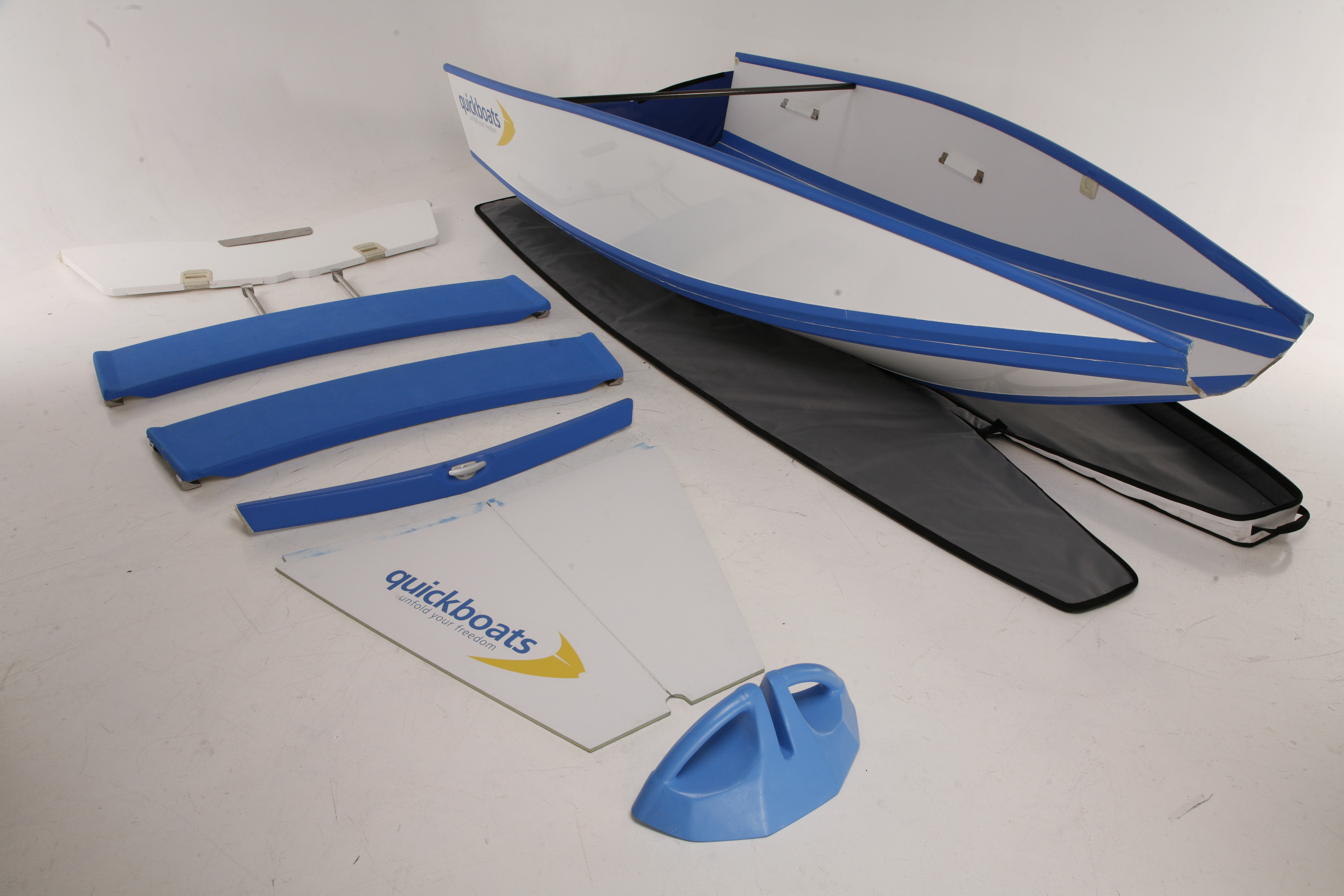
A modern folding board made mostly of polypropylene.

A folding boat is usually a smaller boat, typically ranging from about 2 to nearly 6 metres (20 ft). Folding boats can be carried by one or two persons, and comfortably fit into a car trunk when packed.

They come in several varieties. There are folding kayaks and folding canoes. These types often use a wooden or aluminum frame and PVC or waterproof fabric for the hull. Other folding boats consist of plastic sheets or marine plywood, resembling origami.

Although there is much to be said of the advantages of a folding boat, they are not commonplace in boating. Aluminium and inflatable alternatives are far more prevalent despite some folding boats such as the Seahopper having been sold for several decades. Sailing versions are particularly popular.

Folding boats have been in use for some time with Shellbend folding boats being developed in the 1890s by Mellard Treleaven Reade. They were constructed from mahogany and canvas.

== Related types ==
Traditional boats in the same category as folding boats include inflatable dinghies and small aluminium boats (tinnies). Inflatable boats try to solve the portability problem with an inflatable keel and side pods. This allows better storage and weight advantages. The main problems of these craft are that they are still quite heavy, can puncture while on the water and can be time-consuming to inflate and deflate for usage. Folding boats require around 10 to 15 minutes to set up and put away but are much tougher than an inflatable craft, and may ultimately be smaller in storage as an inflatable boat may have hard board components for the floor. Aluminium boats cannot be disassembled, and the folding boat of space-age material is stronger than aluminium, while the strength to weight of some wooden ply is actually better than aluminium. The lower stiffness and rigidity may add to potential safety of a folding boat by allowing it to flex over waves. This stops the boat from the rocking effect of an inflexible boat.

== Powered ==
Some folding boats have a transom for attaching an electric or petrol engine outboard. These are usually in the order of 2 - 4HP but can be up to 10HP. Electric motors are versatile on a folding boat and are well suited to calm water fishing due to low noise and weight.

== Models ==
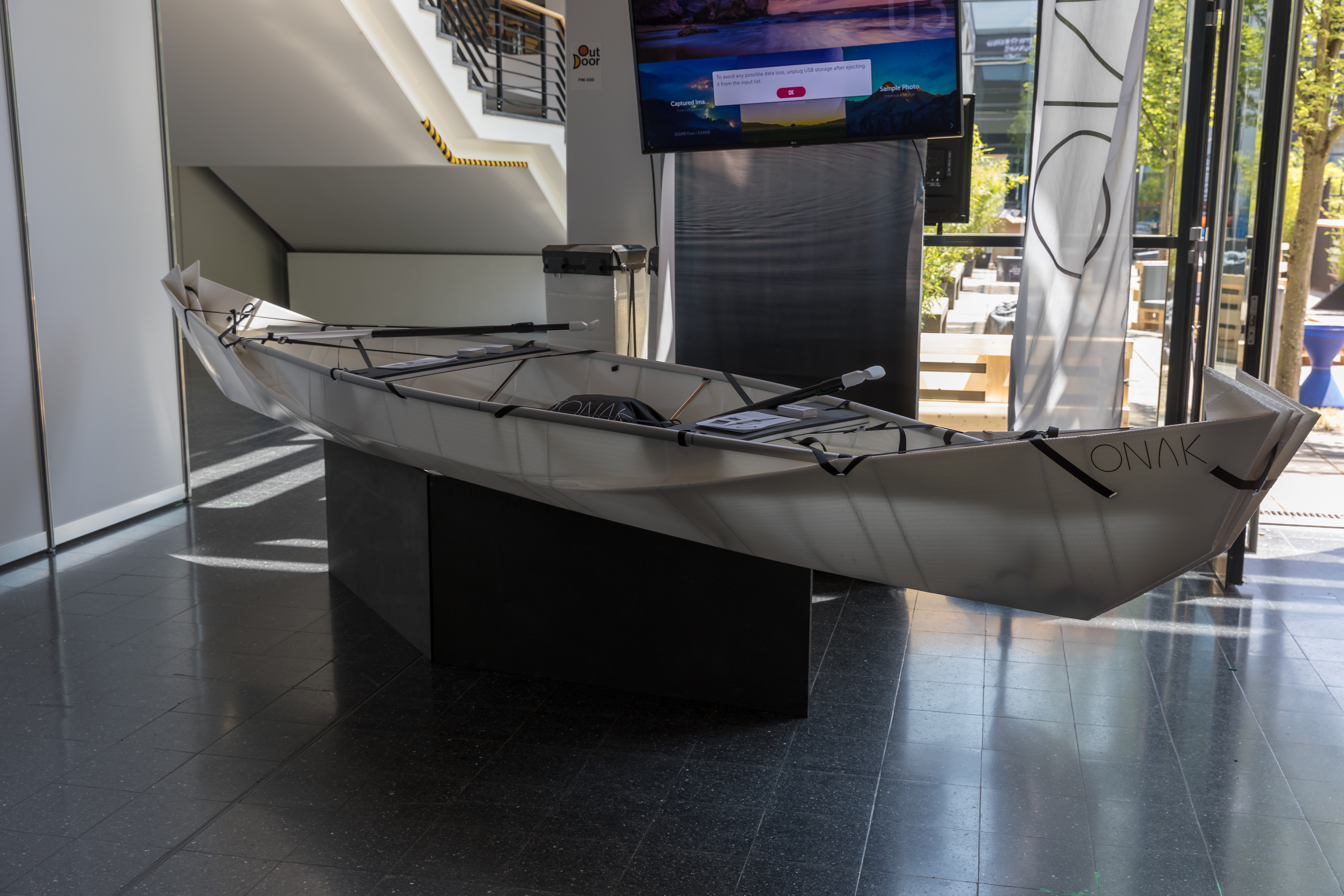
folding canoe

Folding boats of various types and makes have been created over time. Among them are:

- Berthon Collapsible Lifeboat
- Engelhardt collapsible lifeboats, as used on the Titanic
- Flat-Out-Boat
- Folding kayak
- Frankton
- InstaBoat
- Porta-bote
- Quickboat
- Seahopper
- Shellbend

== See also ==
- Sea kayak
