= Henry Clark Pidgeon =

English painter (1807–80)

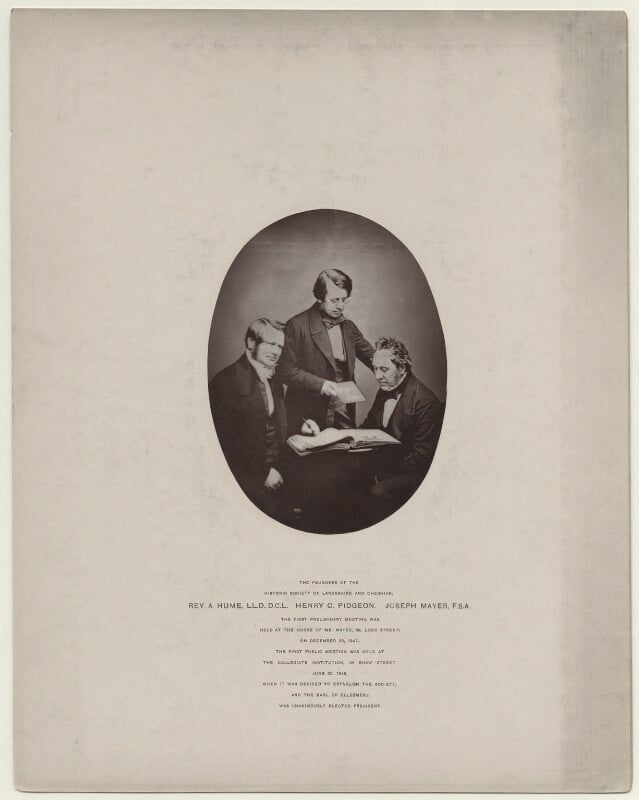
- Pidgeon (centre) with Hume (left) and Mayer (right) sometime after 1848
- Born: 1807
- Died: 6 August 1880 (aged 72–73); University College Hospital, London
- Known for: Watercolours, Landscapes

Henry Clark Pidgeon (1807–1880) was an English painter in water-colours and antiquary.

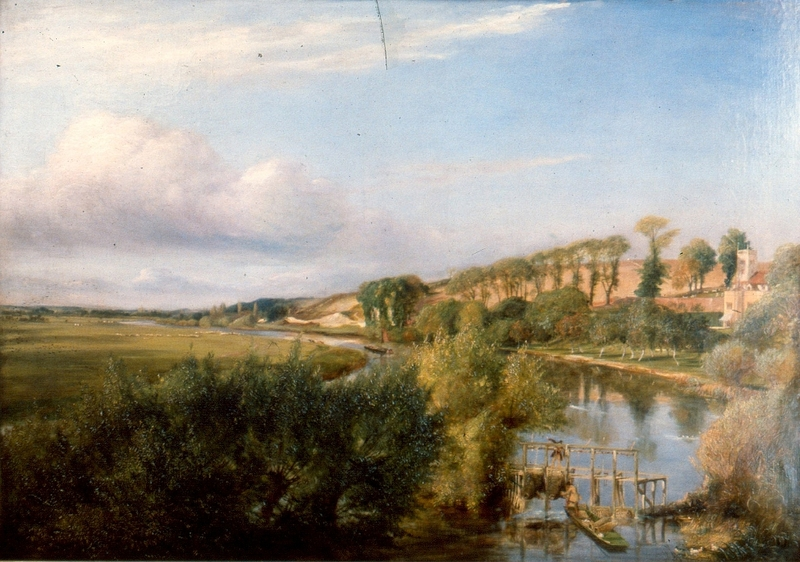
View of the Thames from Caversham Bridge, Berkshire (1840) by Henry Clark Pidgeon

== Life ==
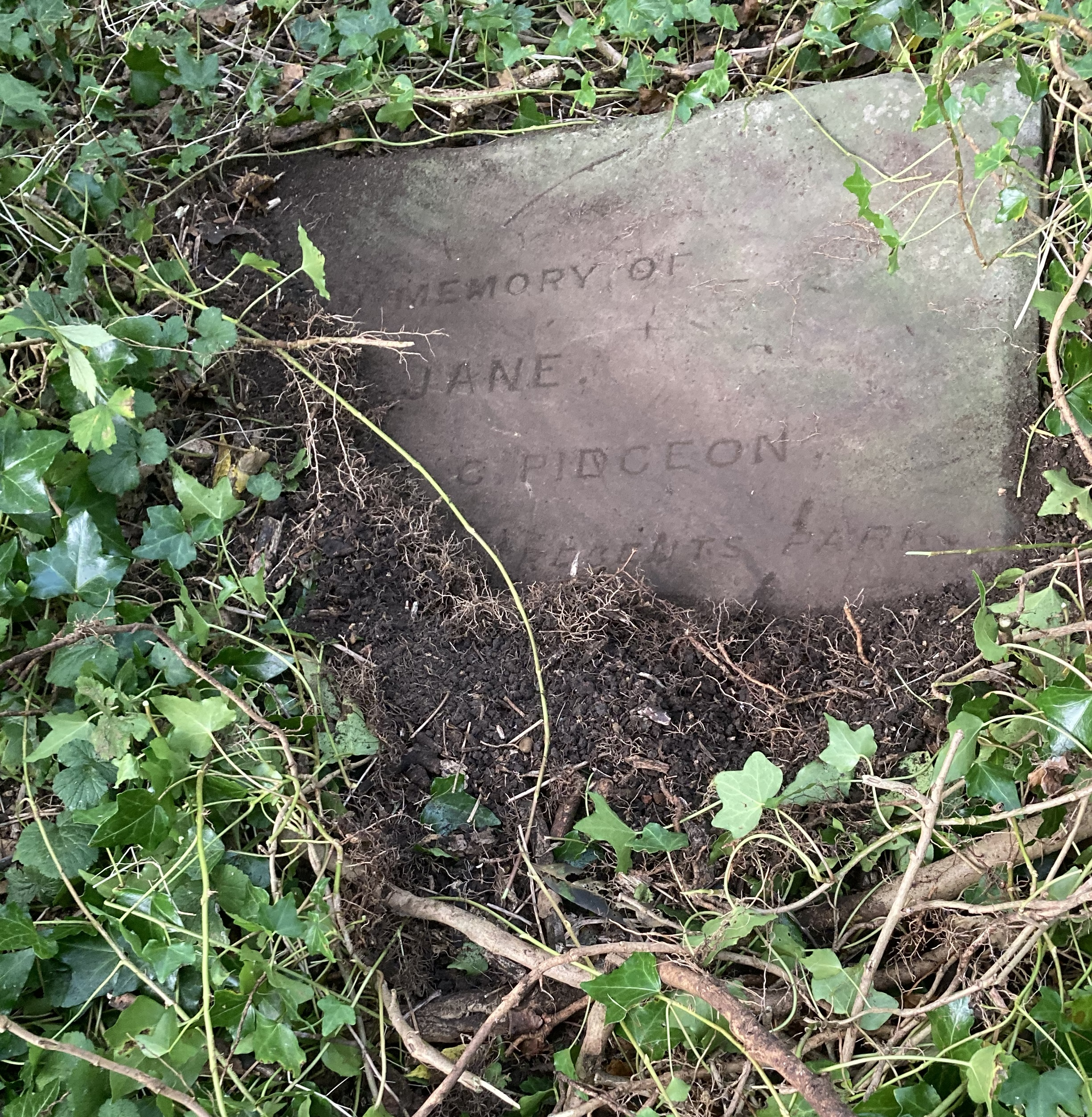
Grave of Henry Clark Pidgeon in Highgate Cemetery

Pigeon practised as an artist and teacher of drawing in London. In 1847 he moved to Liverpool, where he was professor of the school of drawing at the Liverpool Institute, gave private lessons, and drew local scenes and antiquities. He became a member of the Liverpool Academy of Arts in 1847, and was its secretary in 1850. He was a non-resident member from then to the reconstruction of the academy in 1865.

With Joseph Mayer and Abraham Hume, Pidgeon in 1848 founded the Historic Society of Lancashire and Cheshire. He and Hume were joint-secretaries till January 1851, when Pidgeon moved back to London. There he continued his practice as a painter and a teacher of art. He had been elected an associate of the Institute of Painters in Water-colours in 1846, and a full member in 1861. He was also president of the Sketching Club.

Pidgeon died at University College Hospital, London on 6 August 1880, in his seventy-fourth year and was buried with his wife Jane, who died the same year, on the eastern side of Highgate Cemetery. Very little of their gravestone (plot no.23912) is now visible.

== Works ==
Some fifty works by Pidgeon were hung at the Liverpool Academy's annual exhibitions. From 1838 he exhibited in London: four pictures at the Royal Academy, two at the British Institution, and 15 at the Suffolk Street Gallery. He showed some twenty works at the Royal Manchester Institution, between 1841 and 1856. He contributed papers and drawings to the journals of the Archæological Institute, the British Archæological Association, and the Liverpool Literary and Philosophical Society. To Historic Society of Lancashire and Cheshire's publications he contributed etchings and lithographs.

For the Great Exhibition of 1851, Pidgeon did an extensive series of illustrations for the Illustrated London News.

== Notes ==
Attribution

This article incorporates text from a publication now in the public domain: Lee, Sidney, ed. (1896). "Pidgeon, Henry Clark". Dictionary of National Biography. Vol. 45. London: Smith, Elder & Co.

Professional and academic associations
Preceded by Creation	Secretary of the Historic Society of Lancashire and Cheshire; 1848–51	Succeeded by Abraham Hume
