= Esther Copley =

English religious tractarian and children's writer

- Born: 10 May 1786; London
- Died: 17 July 1851 (aged 65); Eythorne, Kent
- Resting place: Eythorne Baptist Churchyard
- Occupations: tractician, didactic, economist
- Spouses: James Philip Hewlett (1809–1820); William Copley (1827–1851)
- Writing career
- Genres: religious tracts didactic books for children
- Subjects: Religion, pedagogy, home economy

Esther Copley, Esther Hewlett or sometimes Esther Hewlett Copley (née Esther Beuzeville, 10 May 1786 – 17 July 1851) was an English religious tractarian and a prolific author, publishing children's books, tracts, sacred history and biography.

== Life ==
Copley was the youngest daughter of a silk manufacturer, Peter Beuzeville (1741–1812), and his wife, Mary Griffith Meredith (1744–1811), who were both of Huguenot origin. On her father's retirement, the family moved to Henley-on-Thames, where in 1809 she married the Oxford cleric James Philip Hewlett (1779/80–1820), curate of St. Aldate's, Oxford, and chaplain of the Oxford University colleges of Magdalen and New College. They had three sons, two of whom also become Anglican clerics, and two daughters who married two brothers: Esther Beuzeville Hewlett married Ebenezer Sargent and Emma Hewlett married George Eliel Sargent.

As a widow, Esther married in 1827 William Copley (1796–1857), a Baptist minister in Oxford, whose chapel she had already joined. They moved later to St. Helier, Jersey, then to Eythorne, Kent, but they separated in 1843, perhaps due to Copley's alcoholism, which had already involved her in writing his sermons for him. Esther is buried in the Eythorne Baptist churchyard.

== Writings ==
Esther was a prolific author of children's books, tracts, and books on domestic economy. Cottage Comforts (1825), addressed to the labouring classes, had reached 24 edition by 1864, for example. Among several works on domestic matters was the pamphlet Hints on the Cholera morbus (1832), on how to prevent and treat the disease.

Copley's stories for children were mainly didactic, designed to make them thrifty and good by providing examples of moral behaviour. She has been compared to writers such as Harriet Martineau and Eliza Meteyard who used fiction in similar ways. She also wrote longer, non-fiction works for children, including Scripture Natural History for Youth (1828) and a 500-page History of Slavery and its Abolition (1836), which derived slavery from human sinfulness. Family Experiences and Home Secrets (1851) incorporated three earlier books, in which a family is shown to prosper through hard work, foresight and benevolence.

Copley's recipe book Cottage Cookery (1859) included instructions on how to make stews, broths, pies and pudding and was aimed at poor wives. In the chapter on 'Frugality and Cheap Cookery' she suggests sending out children to gather wild fruits and drying strawberry leaves to make tea. Jill Norman, in her review of Cottage Cookery, points out that although there are many sensible suggestions in the book "as the daughter of a silk manufacturer, Copley had no experience of the struggle to feed a family on a few shillings a week with minimal cooking facilities, and sometimes even no fire."

== Commemoration ==
Esther Copley was buried at Eythorne Baptist Church under a tree near the gate, In 1996, a plaque commemorating her and her extended family was erected in the United Reformed church, Henley-on-Thames, where she and her parents had moved in the early years of the 19th century.

== Bibliography ==
- Esther Copley (1828). Scripture Natural History for Youth. Vol. 2. H. Fisher, Son, & P. Jackson.
- Esther Copley (1829). Scripture History for Youth. H. Fisher, Son & P. Jackson.
- Esther Copley (1839). A History of Slavery and Its Abolition. Houlston & Stoneman.
- Esther Copley (1849). Cholera preventible. Groombridge & Sons.
- Esther Copley (1859) Cottage Cookery. Groombridge & Sons.

== Sources ==
- Rosemary Mitchell, "Copley, Esther (1786–1851)", Oxford Dictionary of National Biography. (Oxford: OUP, 2004). . Subscription required, accessed 8 May 2010. This cites D. M. Lewis, ed., The Blackwell Dictionary of Evangelical Biography, 1730–1860, (Oxford, 1995), "Biographical sketch of Mrs Copley". In: Copley, E.: The Complete Cottage Cookery. 11th ed. (London: William Wesley, 1859), pp. v–x, and Baptist sources.
