= Kingston, Kent =

Village in Kent, England

Coordinates: 51.2193°N 1.1467°E

Kingston
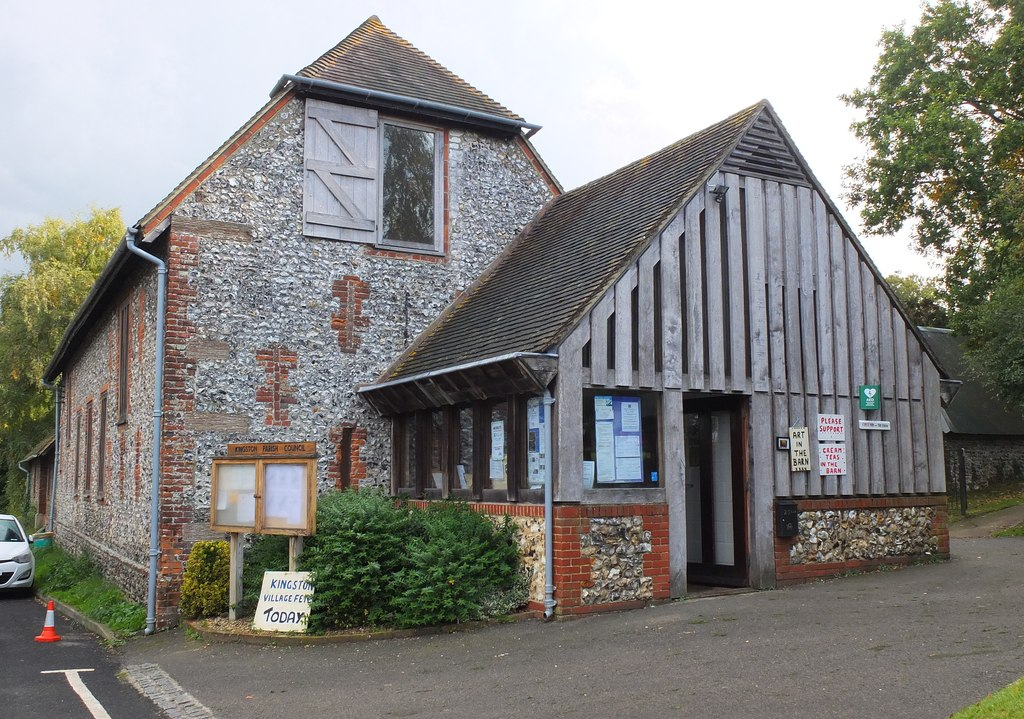
- Kingston Village Hall

- Location within Kent
- Area: 5.12 km^{2} (1.98 sq mi)
- Population: 471 (Civil Parish 2011)
  - Density: 92/km^{2} (240/sq mi)
- OS grid reference: TR198513
- Civil parish: Kingston
- District: City of Canterbury
- Shire county: Kent
- Region: South East
- Country: England
- Sovereign state: United Kingdom
- Post town: CANTERBURY
- Postcode district: CT4
- Dialling code: 01227
- Police: Kent
- Fire: Kent
- Ambulance: South East Coast
- UK Parliament: Canterbury

Kingston is a village and civil parish between Canterbury and Dover in Kent, South East England. The parish contains the hamlet of Marley.

== History ==
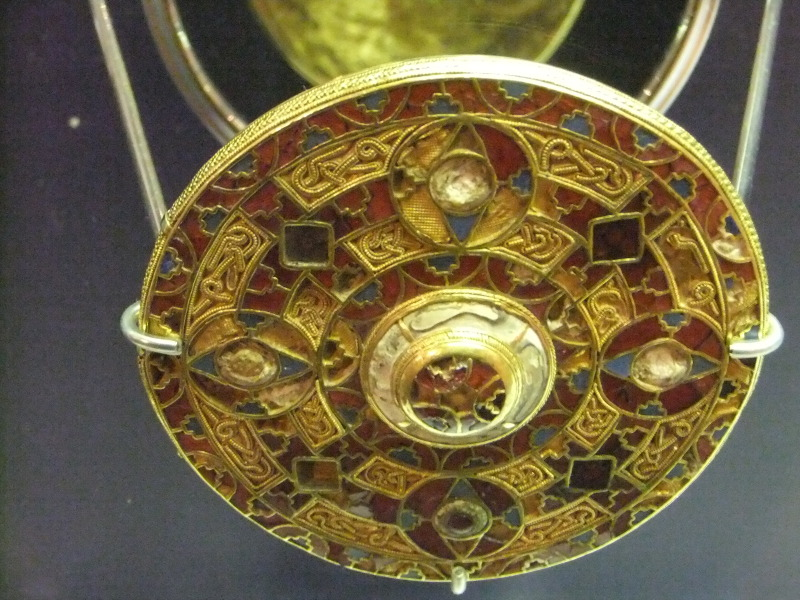
The Kingston Brooch, now World Museum Liverpool

The Kingston Brooch, an important piece of Anglo-Saxon jewellery dating from the 7th Century, was discovered in a tumulus on Kingston Downs in 1771 by the Reverend Bryan Faussett (1720–1776), then Rector of Kingston. It is 8 cm in diameter, made of gold, with garnet, blue glass and shell settings. It is now on display in the World Museum in Liverpool.

== Geography ==
The village is centred 5 miles south east of the city centre of Canterbury on the edge of the North Downs in rolling hilly countryside that is an Area of Outstanding Natural Beauty.

== Religious sites ==
The local church, dedicated to Saint Giles, originated during the 11th century, and is now part of the Barham Downs group of churches. The walls of the nave and about two-thirds of the present chancel are thought to be original, the chancel being extended in the 13th century. The font is also said to date from the 13th Century. The tower of a windmill stands some distance from the village.

== Notable people ==
Sheila May Edmonds, mathematician, born here in 1916
