= Sheila May Edmonds =

English academic

- Born: 1 April 1916
- Died: 2 September 2002 (aged 86)
- Education: University of Cambridge
- Scientific career
- Workplaces: Newnham College, University of Cambridge
- Thesis: Some Multiplication Problems (1944)
- Doctoral advisor: G. H. Hardy

Sheila May Edmonds (1 April 1916 – 2 September 2002) was a British mathematician, a Lecturer at the University of Cambridge, and Vice-Principal of Newnham College from 1960 to 1981.

== Early life and education ==
Born in Kingston, Kent, Edmonds studied at Wimbledon High School and entered Newnham College, Cambridge in 1935 to study for the Mathematical Tripos. At this time women could attend lectures and sit examinations but were not permitted to graduate with a degree. She had an excellent undergraduate career and finished Part II as a "Wrangler", Cambridge nomenclature for a student achieving a First Class award. Edmonds followed this with a Distinction in Part III, and then studied for a PhD with G. H. Hardy. During her doctoral research she spent a year at Westfield College, London, and a year at the University of Paris. She was awarded PhD for her dissertation "Some Multiplication Problems" in 1944.

== Career ==
Edmonds's first papers were published while she was studying for her PhD, with two in 1942 on infinite series and on Fourier transforms. These led to a series of papers over the following years, exploring these topics and building on her PhD research into Parseval's theorem.

She was a dedicated teacher, supervising students in all branches of pure and applied mathematics, as well as lecturing courses in the Mathematical Tripos. Edmonds served on the University Faculty Board of Mathematics for many years, and was its chair in 1975 and 1976.

In 1960, Edmonds was appointed Vice-Principal of Newnham, one of the senior offices of the college, a post which she held until her retirement in 1981. She also served on the University of Cambridge Local Examinations Syndicate and the boards of governors of several schools including Rodean.
