= Historic Society of Lancashire and Cheshire =

Historical society and registered charity

- Formation: 20 June 1848; 177 years ago
- Type: Historical society
- Registration no.: 224825
- Legal status: Charity
- Purpose: Historical study; research
- Headquarters: Liverpool, United Kingdom
- Location: Liverpool Central Library
- Region served: Lancashire; Cheshire; Merseyside; Greater Manchester
- Official language: English
- President (34th): Dr Arline Wilson
- Editor (24th): Dr Bertie Dockerill
- Website: www.hslc.org.uk

The Historic Society of Lancashire and Cheshire is a historical society and registered charity founded for the purpose of "collecting, preserving, arranging and publishing such Historical Documents, Antiquities…Specimens of Ancient and Medieval Art, etc. as are connected with the Counties Palatine of Lancaster and Chester…" on 20 June 1848. The society became a registered charity (No. 224825) in 1964.

Transactions of the Historic Society of Lancashire and Cheshire
- Language: English
- Edited by: Dr Bertie Dockerill

Publication details
- History: 1848–present
- Frequency: Annually

Standard abbreviations
- ISO 4: Trans. Hist. Soc. Lancs. Ches.

Indexing
- ISSN: 2398-1601

Links
- Journal homepage

== Activities ==
The society organises lectures and other events, and has also amassed an extensive collection of materials and publications relating to the history and antiquities of both counties.

== Journal ==
It publishes a peer-reviewed journal, the Transactions of the Historic Society of Lancashire and Cheshire annually.

== Officers ==
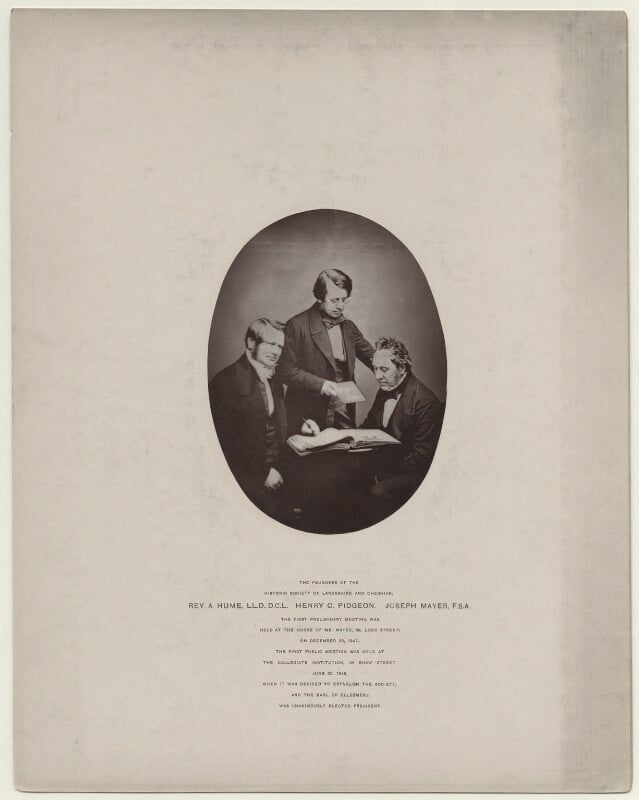
The Society's founders, Abraham Hume, Joseph Mayer and Henry Clark Pidgeon c. 1840s

=== Presidents ===
- 1848–54 Francis, 1st Earl of Ellesmere
- 1854–55 Charles, 3rd Earl of Sefton
- 1855–63 General Hon. Sir Edward Cust
- 1863–66 Rt Hon. William Ewart Gladstone
- 1866–69 Joseph Mayer
- 1869–75 Rev. Canon Abraham Hume
- 1875–79 Very Rev. John Saul Howson
- 1879–85 Thomas Glazebrook Rylands
- 1885–89 Rt Rev. William Stubbs
- 1889–1903 Rt Rev. Francis John Jayne
- 1903–08 Frederick, 16th Earl of Derby
- 1908–36 Edward, 17th Earl of Derby
- 1936–62 William Fergusson Irvine
- 1963–64 Bertram Baron Benjamin Benas
- 1964–65 John Joseph Bagley
- 1965–66 W. G. H. Jones
- 1966–69 Joan Beck
- 1969–72 Maurice Marples Schofield
- 1972–75 Thomas Lloyd-Jones
- 1975–78 Neville Carrick
- 1978–81 Brian Collins Redwood
- 1981–84 Dr Michael J. Power
- 1984–87 Joan Beck
- 1987–90 Dr Jennifer I. Kermode
- 1990–93 Sylvia A. Harrop
- 1993–96 Prof. Paul Edward Hedley Hair
- 1996–99 Dr Colin Bonham Phillips
- 1999–2003 F. Ian Dunn
- 2003–06 Dr Suzanne Schwarz
- 2006–09 Janet E. Hollinshead
- 2009–12 Dr Nicholas J. White
- 2012–15 Prof. John C. Belchem
- 2015–16 Dr Paul J. Sillitoe
- 2016–23 Dr Arline Wilson
- 2023- Professor R.C. Richardson

=== Transactions editors ===
- 1911–28 John Brownbill
- 1928–35 Eric Hardwicke Rideout
- 1935–38 Rev. Dr William Wingfield Longford
- 1938–45 Francis Arthur Bailey
- 1945–48 Rev. Charles Frank Russell
- 1948–50 Dr Frederick Threlfall Wainwright
- 1950–68 John Joseph Bagley
- 1961–68 Dr James Murphy
- 1967–71 K. B. Drake
- 1970–79 Dr Michael J. Power
- 1971–75 Dr P. J. Buckland
- 1973–90 Dr Jennifer I. Kermode
- 1979–99 Dr Colin Bonham Phillips
- 1990–2002 Dr Christopher P. Lewis
- 1996–2001 Dr Sylvia A. Harrop
- 1996–2011 Prof. John C. Belchem
- 1999–2006 Dr Graeme J. Milne
- 2001–06 John Tiernan
- 2002–07 Dr Suzanne Schwarz
- 2003–06 Dr P. Dalton
- 2006–11 Prof. Peter G. I. Gaunt
- 2011–15 Dr Andy J. Gritt
- 2016 Dr Alan G. Crosby
- 2017–present Dr Bertie Dockerill

=== Secretaries ===
- 1848–51 Henry Clark Pidgeon
- 1848–64 Rev. Dr Abraham Hume
- 1864–67 Nicholas Waterhouse
- 1867–77 Dr David Buxton
- 1877–84 Charles Tindal Gatty
- 1884–88 Edward W. M. Hance
- 1884–1903 Richard Duncan Radcliffe
- 1903–10 William Fergusson Irvine
- 1910–14 Frank Charles Beazley
- 1914–28 Dr Philip Nelson
- 1928–39 Samuel Saxon Barton
- 1939–43 Frederick George Blair
- 1943–44 Arthur Cecil Wardle
- 1944–45 Dr Walter Alison Phillips
- 1944–51 Francis Arthur Bailey
- 1951–58 Dr George Chandler
- 1958–59 H. A. Taylor
- 1959–66 Joan Beck
- 1966–70 Patricia R. Pleasance
- 1970–83 P. J. Andrews
- 1983–89 Janet E. Hollinshead
- 1989–92 G. M. Wyatt
- 1992–present Roger C. Hull

=== Treasurers ===
- 1848–60 Thomas Avison
- 1860–67 William Burke
- 1867–85 John G. Jacob
- 1886–98 Henry Douglas Eshelby
- 1898–1905 William E. Gregson
- 1905–11 Frank Charles Beazley
- 1911–22 S. W. Phipps
- 1922–26 Percy Culverwell Brown
- 1926–28 H. K. Hardwick Cox
- 1928–39 William J. Holgate
- 1939–45 Dr Walter Alison Phillips
- 1945–67 W. G. H. Jones
- 1965–72 Charles R. Ambler
- 1967–72 A. W. Andrews
- 1972–81 Robert Bromley
- 1981–87 Roy George Dottie
- 1987–89 G. J. Wilson
- 1989–2000 Janet E. Hollinshead
- 2000–07 C. F. Foster
- 2007–16 Dr Arline Wilson
- 2016-present Catherine Nunn

== See also ==
- Chetham Society
- Lancashire and Cheshire Antiquarian Society
- Lancashire Parish Register Society
- Record Society of Lancashire and Cheshire
