= Philip Nelson (antiquarian) =

20th-century physician

Philip Nelson MA MD FRSE FRSA
- Born: 1872
- Died: 17 February 1953 (aged 80–81)

Academic background
- Education: Victoria University, Liverpool

Academic work
- Discipline: Pathology; Numismatics
- Institutions: Liverpool University
- Main interests: Laryngology

Philip Nelson FRSE FRSA (1872 – 1953) was a 20th-century physician, antiquary and collector of ancient cuneiform tablets, coins and stained glass most of which is now held together at the Liverpool Museum under the title of the Nelson Collection.

== Life ==
He was born in England in 1872. He studied medicine at Victoria University, Liverpool, graduating MA then MD.

His roles were varied: he was a reader in numismatics at Liverpool University; demonstrator in pathology at Liverpool University; and Laryngologist at Liverpool Chest Hospital. Meanwhile he amassed a huge personal collection of artefacts relating to his love of ancient tablets, coins and stained glass.

In 1924 he was elected a Fellow of the Royal Society of Edinburgh. His proposers were John Edward Gemmell, Sir William Abbott Herdman, Sir James Barr and John George Adami.

He died on 17 February 1953. His huge collection of stained glass is now held by Liverpool Museum.

== Publications ==
- Ancient Painted Glass in England 1170–1500 (1913)

Professional and academic associations
Preceded by Frank Charles Beazley	Secretary of the Historic Society of Lancashire and Cheshire; 1914–28	Succeeded by Samuel Saxon Barton
