= Abraham Hume (priest) =

Scots-Irish Anglican priest in Liverpool (1814–84)

The Reverend Canon Abraham Hume FSA
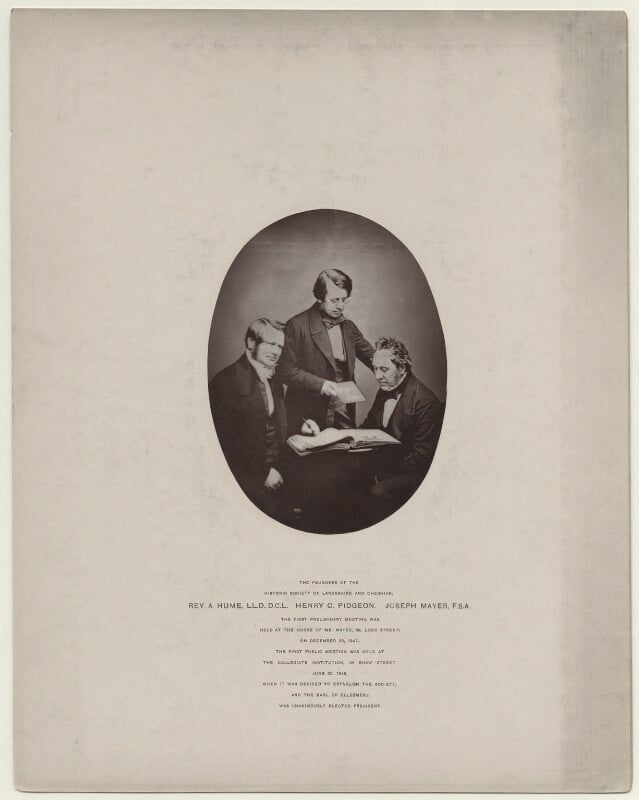
- Hume (left) sometime after 1848, with Pidgeon (centre) ad Mayer (right)
- Born: 9 February 1814; Hillsborough, County Down
- Died: 21 November 1884 (aged 70); Liverpool, Lancashire
- Education: Belfast Royal Academy; Glasgow University; Trinity College Dublin
- Occupations: Priest; Antiquary

Abraham Hume (1814–1884) was a Scots-Irish Anglican priest in Liverpool, known as a social researcher, supporter of learned societies, and antiquary.

== Life ==
The son of Thomas F. Hume, of Scottish descent, he was born at Hillsborough, County Down, on 9 February 1814. He was educated at the Belfast Royal Academy, Glasgow University, and Trinity College Dublin.

On leaving Trinity College, Hume was for some time a mathematics and English teacher, first in Belfast, and then at the Liverpool Institute and Liverpool Collegiate Institution. In 1843, he graduated B.A. at Dublin, and received the honorary degree of LL.D. at the University of Glasgow. In the same year he was ordained deacon by the Bishop of Chester, and after serving as curate for four years without stipend at St. Augustine's, Liverpool, was appointed in 1847 vicar of the new parish of Vauxhall there. In 1845, he launched a severe attack on Vestiges of the Natural History of Creation.

Hume took part in most of the public, scientific, educational, and ecclesiastical events in Liverpool. In 1848, with Joseph Mayer and Henry Clark Pidgeon, he established the Historic Society of Lancashire and Cheshire, of which he was a mainstay for many years. He began close social and statistical inquiries in some of the Liverpool parishes. During 1857 and 1858, he sent to The Times summaries of his previous year's work in his parish. In 1858 and 1859, he gave evidence before select committees of the House of Lords, first on divine worship in populous places, and secondly on church rates.

In 1867, Hume was sent on a tour by the South American Missionary Society, and explored the west coast, especially Chile and Peru. On the visit of the Church Congress to Liverpool in 1869, he acted as secretary and edited the report. He was also secretary to the British Association at Liverpool in 1870. He was vice-chairman of the Liverpool school board 1870–6, and secretary of the Liverpool bishopric committee 1873–80. He was an activist for the formation of the Anglican Diocese of Liverpool, and on its creation in 1880 designed the episcopal seal. He was a fellow of the Society of Antiquaries of London, of the Royal Society of Northern Antiquaries at Copenhagen, and other similar associations; and was a fellow of the Royal Statistical Society.

Hume died unmarried on 21 November 1884, and was buried at Anfield cemetery, Liverpool.

== Works ==
Hume wrote more than a hundred books and pamphlets. They included:

- The Learned Societies and Printing Clubs of the United Kingdom, London, 1847, an enlarged edition in 1853.
- Sir Hugh of Lincoln, London, 1849.
- Remarks on Certain Implements of the Stone Period, 1851.
- Two essays on 'Spinning and Weaving, 1857.
- Condition of Liverpool, Religious and Social, Liverpool, 1858.
- Miscellaneous Essays contributed to the "Ulster Journal of Archæology", 1860.
- Rabbin's Olminick (Belfast dialect), 1861–3.
- Ancient Meols, or some Account of the Antiquities found on the Seacoast of Cheshire, London, 1863.
- Examination of the Changes in the Seacoast of Lancashire and Cheshire, 1866.
- Facts and Suggestions connected with Primary Education, Liverpool, 1870.
- Origin and Characteristics of the People in the Counties of Down and Antrim, Belfast, 1874.
- Remarks on the Irish Dialect of the English Language, 1878.
- Some Scottish Grievances, 1881.
- Detailed Account of how Liverpool became a Diocese, London, 1881.

== Notes ==
Attribution

This article incorporates text from a publication now in the public domain: Lee, Sidney, ed. (1891). "Hume, Abraham (1814-1884)". Dictionary of National Biography. Vol. 28. London: Smith, Elder & Co.

Professional and academic associations
Preceded by Joseph Mayer	President of the Historic Society of Lancashire and Cheshire; 1869–75	Succeeded by John Saul Howson
Preceded by Henry Clark Pidgeon	Secretary of the Historic Society of Lancashire and Cheshire; 1848–64	Succeeded by Nicholas Waterhouse
