= Kingston Brooch =

7th-century Anglo-Saxon composite brooch

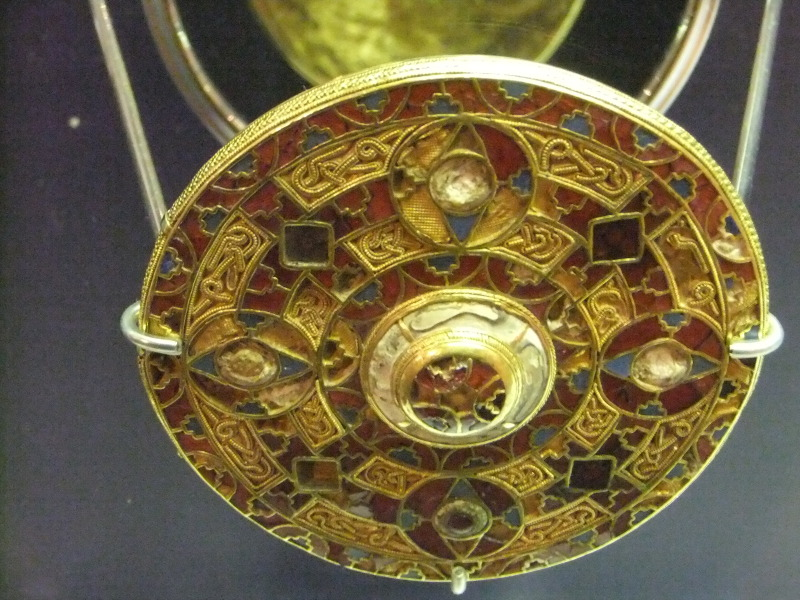
- Material: Gold, garnet, pearl and glass
- Size: 8 cm in diameter
- Created: 7th century AD
- Period/culture: Anglo-Saxon
- Discovered: 1771
- Place: Kingston, England
- Present location: World Museum Liverpool

The Kingston Brooch is the largest known Anglo-Saxon composite brooch, and is considered by scholars to be an outstanding example of the composite disc brooch style. Over time, the Kingston brooch has become widely recognized for its charm, inherent value and detailed workmanship. The brooch, created in the seventh century, is now in the World Museum Liverpool in Liverpool, England.

== Description ==
This brooch is a large composite, slightly convex disc, made of two plates of gold connected by a band of beaded gold wire filigree. The setting design is a modified cross pattern with a central boss (raised ornament) and four additional, smaller bosses, decorated with white shell. Constructed in gold, and inlaid with blue glass, white shell, pearl and garnet, the brooch is 8 centimetres (3.1 in) in diameter. The brooch has been dated to the seventh century.

== History ==
The brooch was discovered on the North Downs above the village of Kingston, Kent on August 5, 1771 by the Reverend Bryan Faussett (1720–1776), Rector of Kingston. Faussett's excavation of 308 graves revealed an early medieval cemetery.

The brooch was uncovered in a burial mound (grave 25) of a small wealthy woman. The grave contained multiple burial goods, including a gold pendant, a glass palm cup, a pair of silver safety-pin brooches, and a bronze hanging-bowl. The ancient burial mound was middle-sized, while the grave was much larger than normal: 10 feet (3.0 m) long by 8 feet (2.4 m) wide by 6 feet (1.8 m) deep.

Constructed in gold, with garnet, shell and blue glass settings, the brooch was in excellent condition when it was discovered. Faussett's notes at the time describe the brooch as “one of the most curious and, for its size, costly pieces of antiquity ever discovered in England.” A favored decorative gemstone, garnet was used throughout Hellenism, and was particularly prized during the Byzantine period.

The ownership of the brooch began with Bryan Faussett. It later passed to his grandson, Godfrey Faussett (1781–1853), Professor of Divinity at the University of Oxford. In August 1853 Godfrey Faussett's son Bryan offered his grandfather's collection of antiquities for sale to the British Museum, only for it to be declined by the trustees. Some outcry was raised in archaeological circles without effect. In 1855, the collection, including the brooch, was sold to the antiquarian and collector, Joseph Mayer (1803–1886). Mayer donated the brooch, along with his entire collection, to the Liverpool Museum in 1867.

== See also ==
- Harford Farm Brooch another Kentish 7th-century brooch
