= John Belchem =

British professor of history

John Belchem FRHistS, FRSA
- Belchem (left), alongside Andy Burnham, in 2009
- Born: 30 May 1948 (age 78)
- Occupations: Emeritus Professor of History, University of Liverpool

Academic background
- Education: University of Sussex; BA (hons) 1970; D.Phil., 1974

Academic work
- Discipline: History

John Belchem is an emeritus British professor whose work covers popular radicalism in 19th-century Britain, Irish migration, the Isle of Man, and modern history. He has a special interest in the history of Liverpool. He was made a fellow of the Royal Historical Society in 1987 and is a fellow of the Royal Society of Arts.

== Academic career ==
Belchem served as head of the School of History, dean of the Faculty of Arts and pro-vice chancellor of the University of Liverpool. He is presently vice-president of the Society for the Study of Labour History.

Belchem's 1985 work on Henry Hunt made a "major contribution to our understanding" of political strategies of progressive movements in 19th-century Britain. Industrialization and the Working Class (1990) was viewed as a "lucid and wide-ranging survey of recent works on working-class movements and their context." Popular Radicalism in Nineteenth-Century Britain (1996) was reviewed as an "excellent work" and a "valuable guide" to the literature on Chartism and the origins of the Labour Party. Merseypride (2000), a collection of essays on the history of Liverpool, is considered to be a "valuable work...of a consistently high standard." His Irish, Catholic and Scouse (2007) was noted to have made a "vital contribution to the historiography of the Irish in Britain."

== Other activities ==
Belchem worked on Liverpool's successful bid for UNESCO World Heritage Site status in 2004. In 2017, he was appointed to the Liverpool mayor's task force, which assisted in efforts that ensured the city's status was not lost when under review by UNESCO in 2018.

He was an adviser on Mike Leigh's 2018 film Peterloo.

== Selected works ==
- "Orator" Hunt: Henry Hunt and English Working-Class Radicalism. New York, NY: Oxford University Press. 1985.
- Class, Party, and the Political System in Britain, 1867–1914. Oxford, England: Basil Blackwell. 1990.
- Industrialization and the Working Class: The English Experience, 1750–1900. Brookfield, VT: Gower Publishing. 1990.
- Popular Radicalism in Nineteenth-Century Britain. New York, NY: St. Martin's. 1996.
- Merseypride: Essays in Liverpool Exceptionalism. Liverpool, England: Liverpool University Press. 2000. ISBN 9780853237150.
- Irish, Catholic and Scouse: The History of the Liverpool-Irish, 1800-1939. Liverpool, England: Liverpool University Press. 2007. ISBN 9781846311079.
- Before the Windrush: Race Relations in Twentieth-century Liverpool. Oxford, England: Oxford University Press. 2014. ISBN 9781846319679.
- John Belchem; Richard Price (2007). Diccionario Akal de Historia del siglo XIX (in Spanish). Translated by Isabel Bennasar Cabrera. Ediciones Akal. ISBN 978-84-460-1848-3.

Professional and academic associations
Preceded by Nicholas J. White	President of the Historic Society of Lancashire and Cheshire; 2012–2015	Succeeded by Paul J. Sillitoe
