= Marley, Canterbury =

Hamlet in Kent, England

Coordinates: 51°12′33″N 1°07′46″E

Marley is a scattered hamlet in the civil parish of Kingston, in the county of Kent, England. The hamlet is on a minor road about 1 mile (1.6 km) southwest from the parish village of Kingston, and 1 mile west from the village of Barham in the adjacent parish.

Before and after the Norman Conquest, it was also home to the family seat of the Wootton family.
