= Thomas Dodd (printseller) =

English printseller and writer (1771–1850)

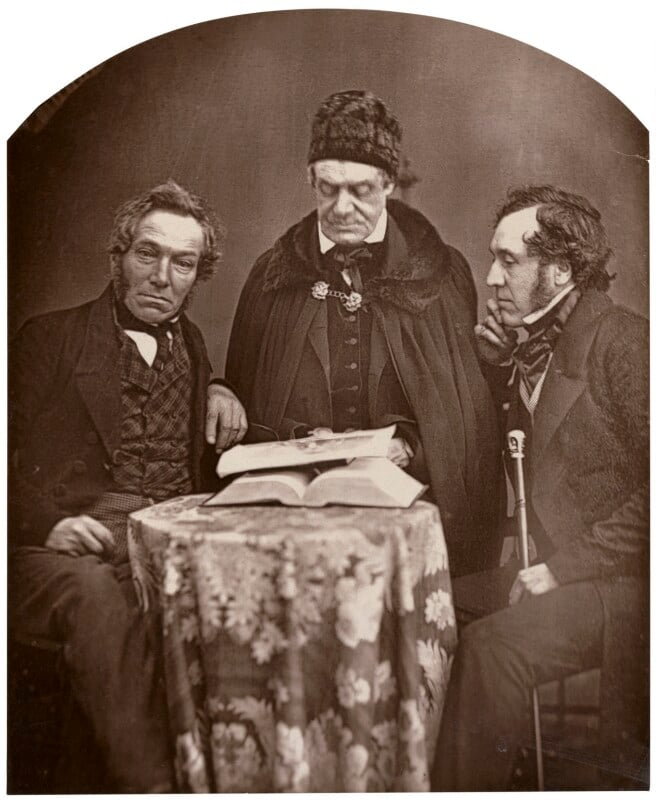
Dodd (centre) with William Clements (left) and Joseph Mayer sometime before 1850

Thomas Dodd (7 July 1771 – 17 August 1850) was an English auctioneer and printseller.

== Early life ==
The son of Thomas Dodd, a tailor, he was born in the parish of Christ Church, Spitalfields, London, on 7 July 1771. When he was ten years old his father left home, and he was taken from school at Shooter's Hill. His first employment was in the service of an Anglo-American colonel named De Vaux; an eccentric adventurer: he was taken about the country as a member of his band of juvenile musicians. After a time the colonel left him with a butcher; he ran away in quest of the colonel, going penniless on foot from London to Liverpool, and from there to Matlock Bath.

At another time, Dodd was left with an itinerant harper at Conway. Harsh treatment induced him to seek the protection of a Welsh innkeeper; then he lived a while with a sporting parson, ultimately returning to London in 1788, and taking a menial position in the shop of his uncle, a tailor named Tooley, in Bucklersbury. His next place was as a footman. In 1794 he married his employer's wait-maid, and opened a day-school near Battle Bridge, St. Pancras. He gave up his school to accept a situation as an engrossing clerk in the enrollment office of the court of chancery.

== Printseller ==
In 1796 Dodd took a small shop in Lambeth Marsh for the sale of old books and prints. Two years later he moved to Tavistock Street, Covent Garden. His dealings in prints gradually extended, and his stock assumed large proportions. In 1806 he opened an auctionroom in St Martin's Lane, and there he sold some famous collections, among them being that of General Dowdeswell in January 1809. In the course of his business he had large sales of prints and books at Liverpool, Portsmouth, and elsewhere. When he was at Ludlow in 1812, he found in the possession of an innkeeper a copy of Henry Holland's Basioloogia (1618), but it was not until seven years later that he was able to buy it.

Good fortune deserted him and his stock dwindled. He settled in Manchester about 1819 as an auctioneer, and in 1823 proposed a scheme which led to the establishment of the Royal Manchester Institution in Mosley Street, and the holding of annual exhibitions of pictures.

Returning to London, he had a sale-room for two years in Leicester Street, Leicester Square, and then became for several years foreman for Martin Colnaghi; from whose establishment he was engaged by the Earl of Yarborough to arrange and complete his collection of prints. In 1844, a widower, he was elected a brother of the Charterhouse.

Dodd died on 17 August 1850 at the residence of Joseph Mayer near Liverpool. He was buried in St James Cemetery, Liverpool.

== Works ==
Dodd acquired a wide knowledge of engravings, and began an elaborate biographical catalogue of engravers, which eventually formed thirty folio volumes of manuscript.

In 1817, Dodd spent time on a dictionary of monograms, but a similar work by Brulliot was published about that time. Before leaving Manchester at the end of 1825 he began to publish his work entitled The Connoisseur's Repertorium; or a Universal Historical Record of Painters, Engravers, Sculptors, and Architects, and of their Works, &c. The first two volumes were published in 1825, and the work was continued to the name "Barraducio" in a sixth volume, issued in 1831, when a lack of support compelled the author to abandon it.

In 1839–41 Dodd made a catalogue, which remained in manuscript, of the Douce collection of fifty thousand prints in the Bodleian Library. He also arranged and catalogued Horace Walpole's prints, which were sold by George Henry Robins for £3,840.

To Joseph Mayer he bequeathed his manuscript compilations and other collections, extending to about two hundred folios, and including his Account of Engravers.
