= Eliza Meteyard =

English writer

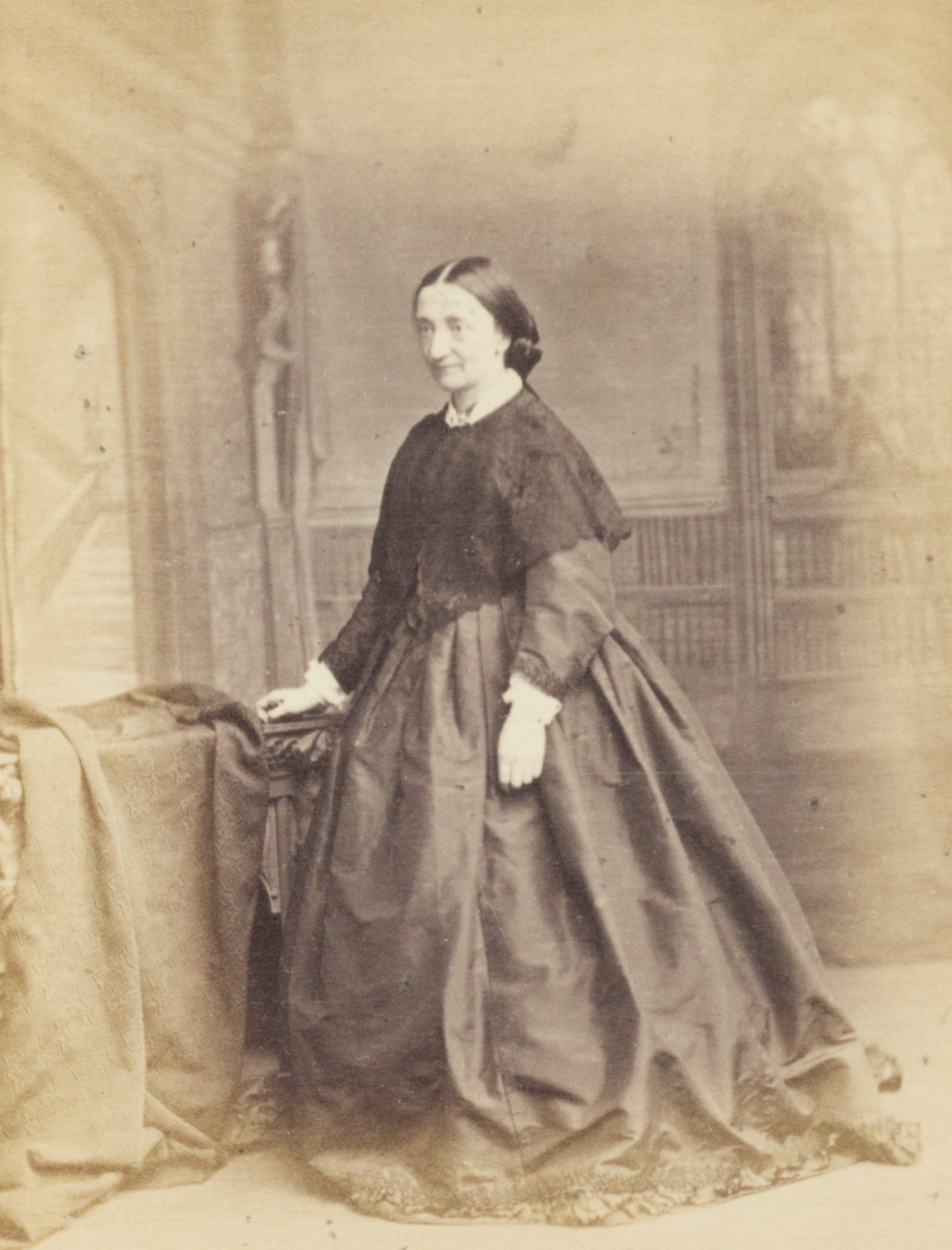
- Portrait of Eliza Meteyard, c.1865
- Born: Eliza Meteyard; 21 June 1816; Lime Street, Liverpool, United Kingdom
- Died: 4 April 1879 (aged 62); Lambeth, United Kingdom
- Occupation: writer
- Known for: Journalism, biographies, feminist writings

Eliza Meteyard (1816–1879) was an English writer. She was known for journalism, essays, novels, and biographies, particularly as an authority on Wedgwood pottery and its creator. She did living writing for periodicals.

== Life ==
The daughter of William Meteyard, a surgeon, and his wife Mary, daughter of Zebedee Beckham of Great Yarmouth, she was born on 21 June 1816, in Lime Street, Liverpool. In 1818 her father became surgeon to the Shropshire militia; she went to Shrewsbury, and in 1829 moved to Thorpe, near Norwich, which was her formative place as she came of age. She left Norwich in 1842, at age 25, and accompanied by an aunt settled in London.

She brought forward proposals for female education, and was active in the Whittington Club, "a Bohemian experiment in middle class social reform", a social and debating club that uniquely gave full membership to lower-middle-class women of learning.

Meteyard died on 4 April 1879 at Stanley Terrace, Fentiman Road, South Lambeth. For a number of years she had enjoyed a civil list pension. A marble medallion of her was executed by Giovanni Fontana, and once belonged to her friend Joseph Mayer, who had helped her in bringing out the Life of Wedgwood.

== Works ==
Meteyard began literary work in 1833 by assisting her eldest brother, a tithe commissioner, in preparing his reports relating to the eastern counties. She afterwards became a regular contributor of fiction and social, sanitary, and antiquarian articles to the periodical press, writing in Eliza Cook's Journal, the People's Journal, Tait's Magazine, Chambers's Journal, Household Words, Country Words, and other journals. One of the topics she highlighted was women's role in emigration. To the first number of Douglas Jerrold's Weekly Newspaper she contributed a leading article; Douglas Jerrold appended the signature of "Silverpen", which she adopted as pen name. She gained prizes for essays on Juvenile Depravity and Omnibus Conductors.

Her first novel was written in 1840 for Tait's Magazine, and republished in 1845 as Struggles for Fame. In 1850 she published a tale for young people, 'The Doctor's Little Daughter,' which drew on her own childhood experiences. Her most popular novels were Mainstone's House keeper, 1860, and Lady Herbert's Gentle-woman, 1862. Between 1850 and 1878 she wrote a series of stories and novels for children.

Her girls' novel Dora and Her Papa (1869) is "a vivid account of a child's life among antiquarians", based on her visits to Lomberdale Hall, the home and private museum of Thomas Bateman.

For Howitt's Journal, started by the Quaker husband-and-wife team of William Howitt and Mary Howitt, Meteyard wrote fiction highlighting small-scale social reform. Her view of prostitution was based on research in police and prison reports.

In 1862, Meteyard turned to non-fiction with Hallowed Spots of Ancient London and in 1865–6 published the Life of Josiah Wedgwood, in two volumes. She used the Wedgwood papers collected by Joseph Mayer; she also acknowledged help from Bennett Woodcroft and Samuel Smiles. This work was followed in 1871 by A Group of Englishmen (1795–1815), being Records of the younger Wedgwoods and their Friends. In 1875 she wrote The Wedgwood Handbook, a Manual for Collectors, and contributed the letterpress descriptions to Wedgwood and his Works, 1873, Memorials of Wedgwood, 1874, Choice Examples of Wedgwood Ware, 1879, and a Catalogue of Wedgwood Manufactures.

The Orlando Project ("Women’s Writing in the British Isles from the Beginnings to the Present", run by Cambridge University Press) states that Meteyard's "work suffered from the pressure to earn, but her journalism in particular is nevertheless powerful in its treatment of the economic and social ills of women."
