= Joseph Mayer (antiquary) =

British Antiquary (1803–86)

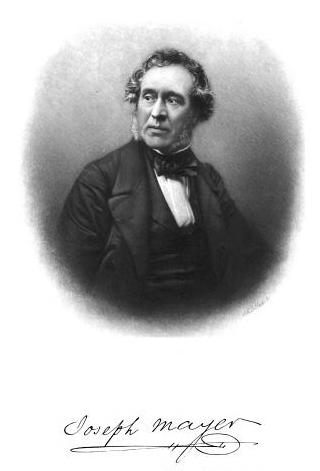
- Joseph Mayer.
- Born: 23 February 1803; Newcastle-under-Lyme,
- Died: 19 January 1886 (aged 82); Bebington, Cheshire
- Known for: Antiquary

Joseph Mayer (1803–1886) was an English goldsmith, antiquary and collector.

== Life ==
The son of Samuel Mayer, a tanner and currier, he was born at Newcastle-under-Lyme, Staffordshire, on 23 February 1803. At the age of 20 he settled in Liverpool as a jeweller and goldsmith: successful in business, he was able to indulge his passion for collecting. In 1860 he devoted himself to the volunteer movement, and was captain of the Liverpool borough guard. He raised and clothed at his own expense a corps of volunteers at Bebington, Wirrall, Cheshire, where he went to live in 1860.

Mayer retired from business in 1873, and died unmarried at Pennant House, Bebington, Cheshire, on 19 January 1886, aged 82. His private library, prints and manuscripts were dispersed by auction in 1887. He is buried in the churchyard of St Andrew's Church, Bebington.

== Collector ==
Mayer acquired many thousands of drawings, engravings, and autograph letters relating to the history of art in England. He became the possessor of large portions of the collections of William Upcott and of Thomas Dodd, the print dealer and collector. Dodd was befriended in his latter days by Mayer, in whose house he died.

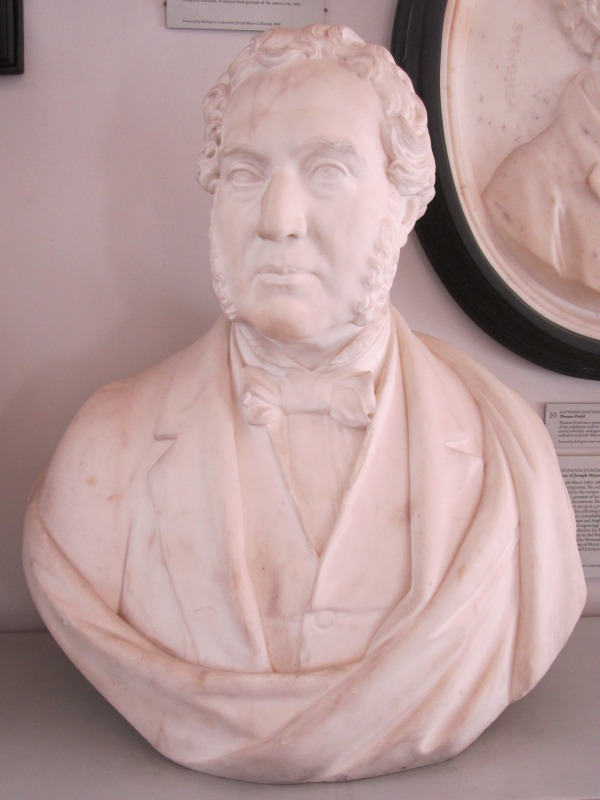
Bust of Joseph Mayer, by Giovanni Fontana (which is on display at the Walker Art Gallery, Liverpool)

One of Mayer's earliest studies was Greek coins, his cabinet of which he sold to the French government in 1844. He opened his own museum in Colquitt Street, Liverpool. It ultimately reached great proportions, and embraced Egyptian antiquities, prehistoric and ethnographic curiosities, glass and pottery (especially Wedgwood ware; British and Anglo-Saxon antiquities, including W. H. Rolfe's collection and that of Anglo-Saxon sepulchral remains made by Bryan Faussett. For this collection Mayer printed in 1856 a catalogue and history, compiled for him by Charles Roach Smith, entitled Inventorium Sepulchrale. Other sections of the museum contained antique ivories, gems and rings, enamels, miniatures, and metalwork.

== Patronage ==
A number of books were printed wholly or in part at Mayer's expense, among them being:

- Sprott's Chronicle, edited by Dr. William Bell, 1851.
- Anglo-Saxon and Old English Vocabularies, edited by Thomas Wright, 2 vols. 1857 and 1873; a second edition, edited by Richard Paul Wülcker, was brought out in 1884.
- Feudal Manuals of English History, edited by Thomas Wright, 1872.

He assisted largely in the publication of Benjamin Thorpe's Diplomatarium Anglicum Ævi Saxonici, 1865, and he supplied Eliza Meteyard with most of the materials for her Life of Wedgwood and Group of Englishmen.

== Works ==
Mayer was one of the founders of the Historic Society of Lancashire and Cheshire, of which he was president from 1866 to 1869. He contributed the following among other papers to its Transactions:

- The Mock Mayor at Newcastle-under-Lyme.
- Roscoe and the Influence of his Writings on the Fine Arts.
- Shotwick Church.
- Liverpool Pottery.
- The Arming of Levies in the Hundred of Wirral.
- Addresses as President.
- The Preparations of the County of Kent to resist the Spanish Armada.
- On the Art of Pottery.

In 1876, he printed a volume on Early Exhibitions of Art in Liverpool, with some Notes for a Memoir of George Stubbs.

== Legacy ==
His museum, valued at £80,000, was presented by Mayer to the corporation of Liverpool in 1867, and became part of the public museum in William Brown Street there. It is now at the World Museum. Objects include the Anglo-Saxon Kingston Brooch. He had previously disposed of a collection of objects of art relating to the Bonaparte family, but at the death of the owner (Mr. Mather) it was bequeathed to the corporation.

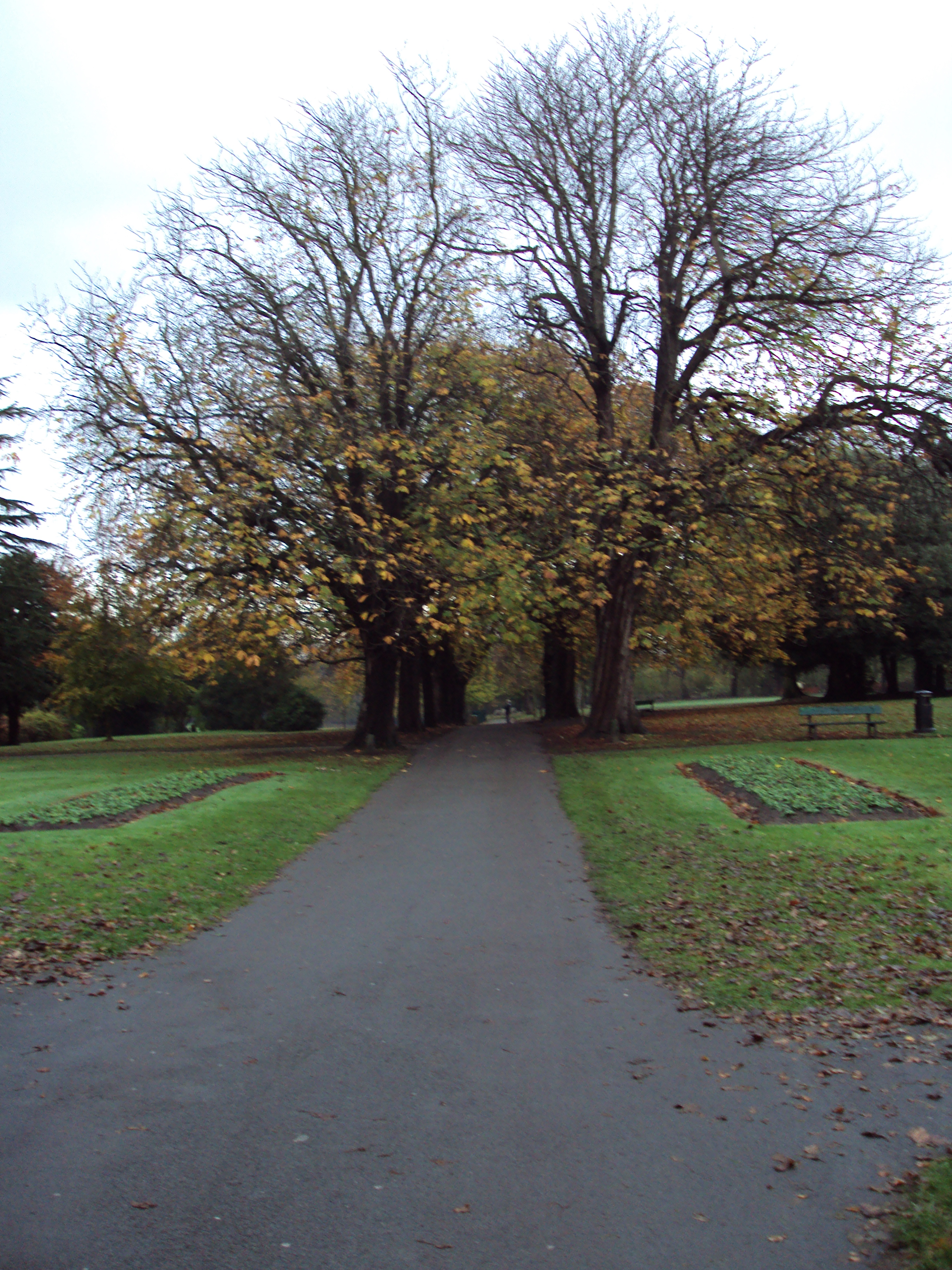
Mayer Park, Bebington, Wirral, Merseyside

In 1866, Mayer established a free library of twenty thousand volumes in Bebington and endowed it. The library stood in public grounds (six acres), which he also dedicated to the use of the people. He founded two scholarships at the Newcastle-under-Lyme High School, and presented drawings and pictures.

A marble statue of Mayer, by Giovanni Fontana, was placed by the Liverpool corporation in St George's Hall in September 1869. His portrait was presented by subscribers to the Bebington Free Library in 1872. Another portrait as a young man, painted by William Daniels, was in the Mayer Museum, Liverpool; it is now in the Walker Art Gallery.

Professional and academic associations
Preceded by William Ewart Gladstone	President of the Historic Society of Lancashire and Cheshire; 1866–69	Succeeded by Abraham Hume
