= Bryan Faussett =

English antiquary born 1720

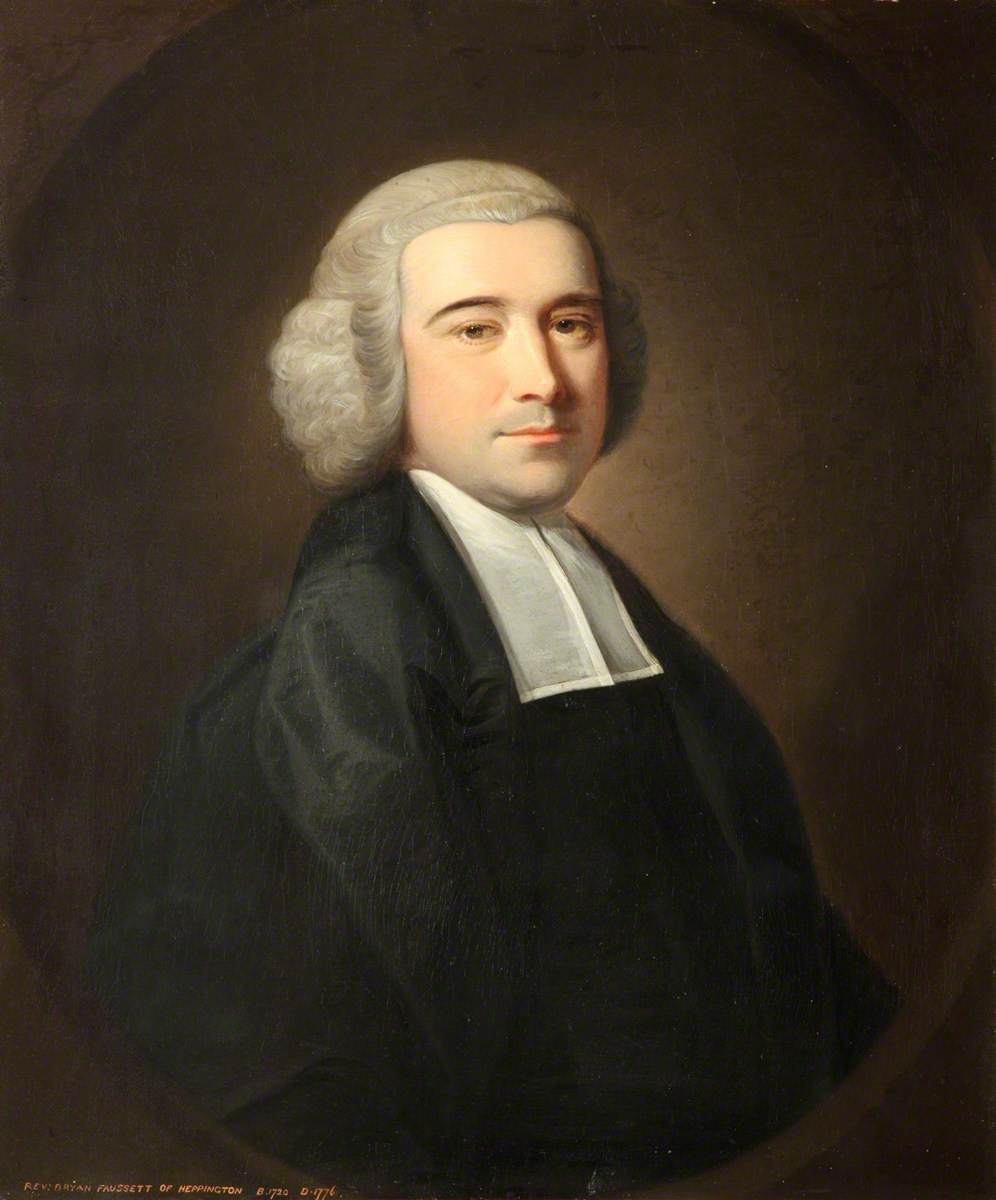
Reverend Bryan Faussett (1720–1776), painting by Thomas Hudson.

Bryan Faussett (30 October 1720 – 20 February 1776) was an English antiquary. Faussett formed a collection that was rich in Anglo-Saxon objects of personal adornment, such as pendants, brooches, beads and buckles. He discovered the Kingston Brooch, the largest known Anglo-Saxon composite brooch. At the time of his death he had the world's largest collection of Anglo-Saxon items.

In 1844, after his death, the collection was exhibited by the British Archaeological Association. In 1853, more than five thousand of his Roman and English coins were sold at Sotheby's. In 1855 his collection was bought by Joseph Mayer, and it is now in the World Museum in Liverpool. He has been described as pioneering because of the extensive archaeological records he kept.

== Early life and education ==
Faussett was born on 30 October 1720, at Heppington, near Canterbury, Kent, the eldest of the thirteen children of Bryan Faussett, senior, of Staplehurst, by his wife Mary, daughter of Henry Godfrey of Heppington and Lydd. He was educated at a Kentish grammar school and at University College, Oxford, where he was known as the "handsome commoner". At Oxford he endeavoured to organise a volunteer corps in aid of the cause of Charles Edward Stuart in 1745–6, and his father convened secret meetings of the Jacobite gentry at Heppington. Faussett graduated B.A. 1742, M.A. 1745, and was elected fellow of All Souls as founder's kin to Archbishop Chichele.

== Career in clergy ==
Faussett was ordained in 1746, and from 1748 to 1750 held the living of Alberbury in Shropshire. From 1750 he lived for some time at Street End House, near Heppington, without clerical duties. Writing to his friend Andrew Ducarel in 1764, he says that he is sorry he ever took orders. Towards the close of his life Archbishop Secker gave him the rectory of Monks Horton and the perpetual curacy of Nackington, both in Kent.

== Antiquary ==
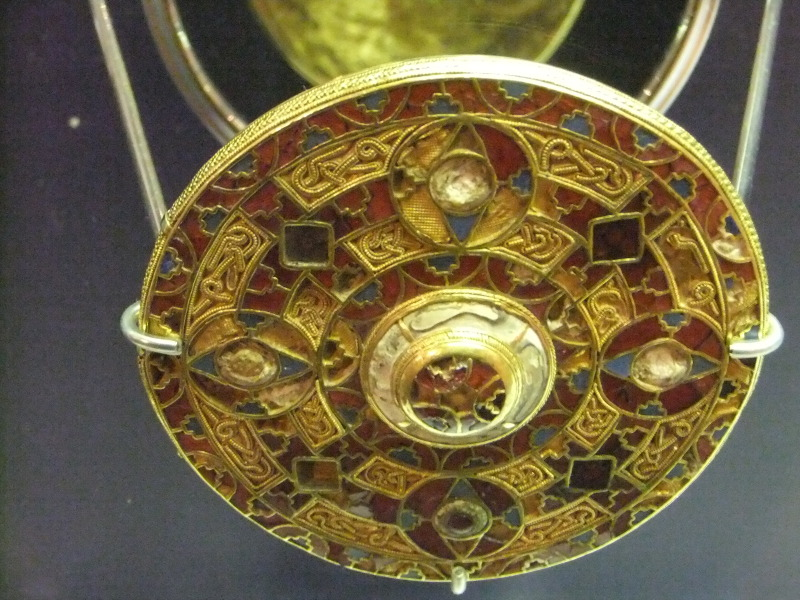
Faussett discovered the Kingston Brooch, now at the World Museum in Liverpool

From about 1750 he had devoted special attention to antiquities, chiefly through the digging of burial mounds. He was also a good heraldist and genealogist, visiting about 160 parish churches in east Kent to copy monumental and armorial inscriptions. His papers were used by Edward Hasted for his History of Kent, who described him as "living entirely rusticated at Heppington". Faussett formed a collection of more than five thousand Roman and English coins, most of which were sold at Sotheby's on 3 December 1853. He had melted down his duplicates, to the weight of 150 lbs., into a bell inscribed Audi quid tecum loquitur Romana vetustas—Ex ære Romano me conflari fecit B. F. A. S. S. 1766.

He began his excavations of Kentish burial mounds, chiefly of the Anglo-Saxon period, in 1757 at Tremworth Down, Crundale. Afterwards he went to work at Gilton, where he opened 106 graves during eleven days in 1760, 1762, and 1763, and at Kingston Down, where he opened 308 graves between August 1767 and August 1773. From 1771 to 1773 he also explored 336 graves at Bishopsbourne, Sibertswold, Barfriston Down, Bekesbourne, and Chartham Down. Faussett made pecuniary sacrifices in order to excavate, and superintended the opening of barrows with "almost boyish enthusiasm". He kept a journal of his operations, minutely recording each grave's contents. This was edited by Charles Roach Smith from the original manuscript in the possession of Joseph Mayer, and published with notes and engravings in 1856 as Inventorium Sepulchrale. In 1763 he was elected fellow of the Society of Antiquaries.

From the numerous antiquities found by him, Faussett formed a collection which was especially rich in Anglo-Saxon objects of personal adornment, such as fibulae (including the Kingston Brooch of gold, garnets and turquoises), pendant ornaments (e.g. gold drops set with garnets), beads, buckles, etc.

== Personal life ==
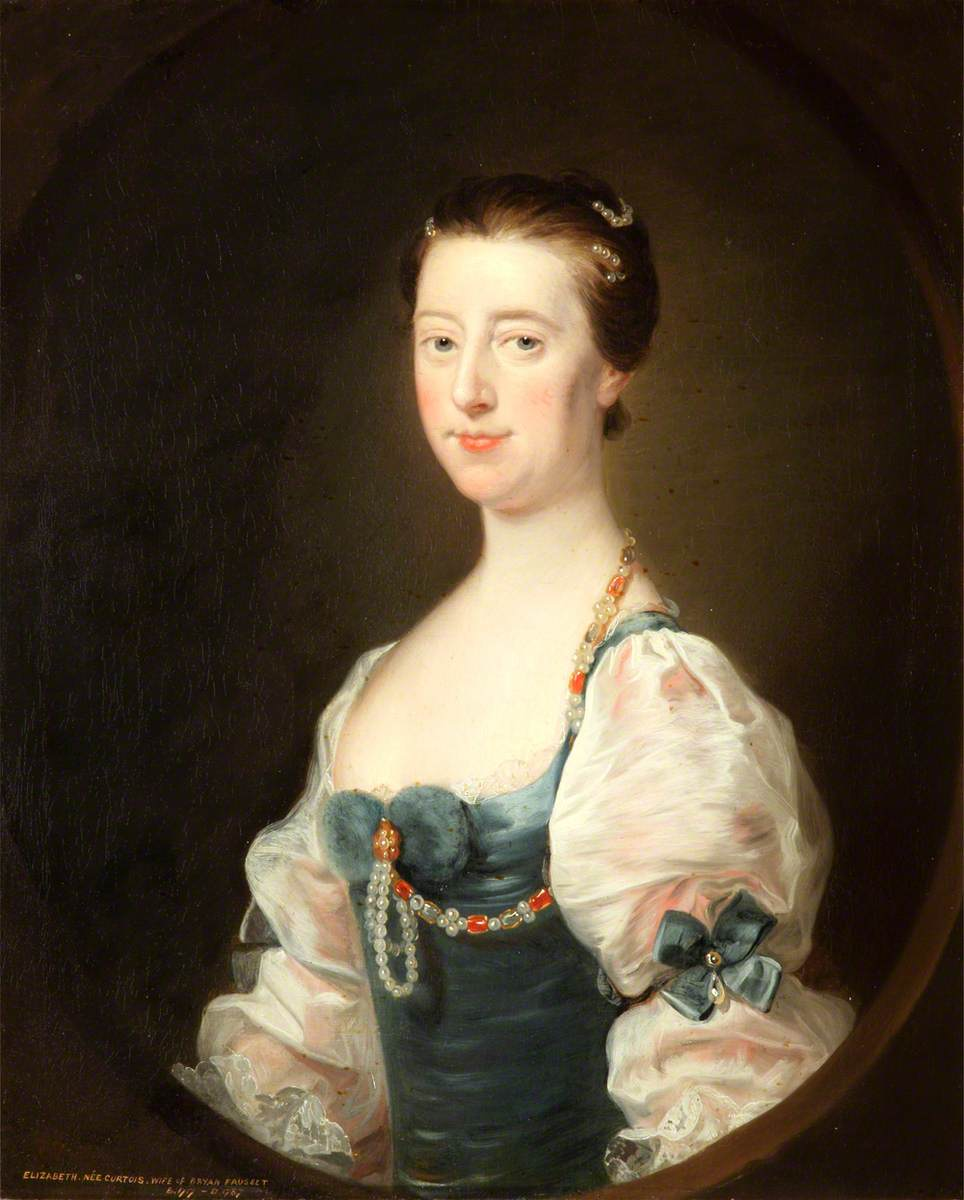
Elizabeth Curtois (b.1714), Wife of Reverend Bryan Faussett, painting by Thomas Hudson.

Faussett married Elizabeth, daughter of the Rev. Rowland Curtois of Hainton, Lincolnshire, and had by her two sons and a daughter. The eldest son, Henry Godfrey Faussett (b. 1749), helped his father in his excavations and succeeded to the estates.

== Death ==
During the last twenty years of his life Faussett suffered from gout, before dying at his seat at Heppington on 20 February 1776. There is a monument to him in Nackington Church, Kent.

== Legacy ==
At the time of Faussett's death he had the world's largest collection of Anglo-Saxon items. He has subsequently been described as pioneering because of the extensive archaeological records he kept.

After his death his collection remained almost unknown until it was exhibited in 1844 at the British Archaeological Association's meeting at Canterbury by its owner, Dr Godfrey Faussett, grandson of Bryan Faussett. In August 1853 Godfrey Faussett's son Bryan offered it for sale to the British Museum, only for it to be declined by the trustees. Some outcry was raised in archaeological circles without effect. In 1855 the collection was bought by Joseph Mayer, and is now in the World Museum, Liverpool.

From 1963 to 1971, medieval archaeologist Sonia Chadwick Hawkes catalogued Faussett's collection.
