= Roman Catholic Diocese of Sarlat =

Former Catholic diocese in France

Coordinates: 44.89°N 1.22°E

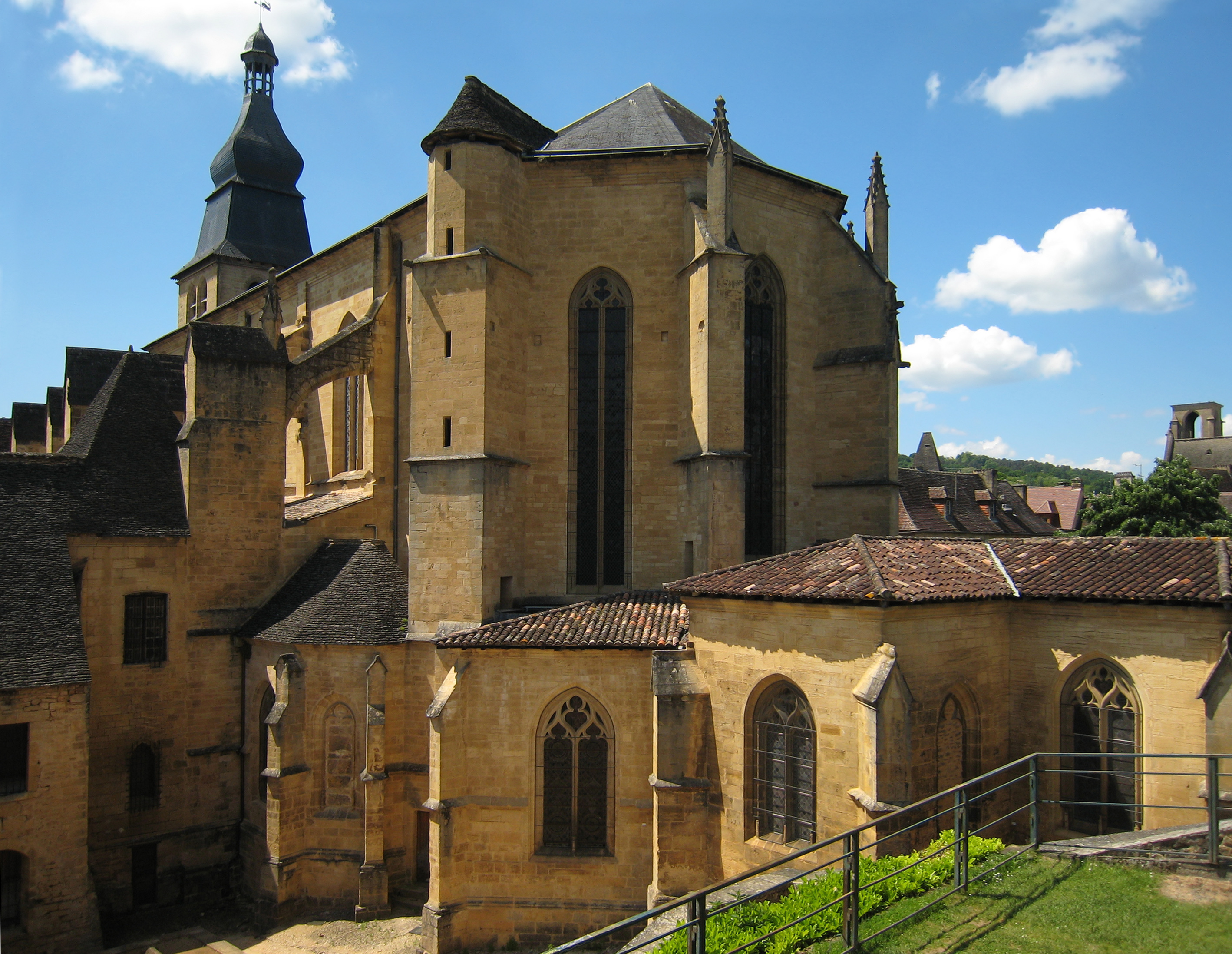
Sarlat Cathedral

The French Catholic Diocese of Sarlat existed from 1317 to 1801, with its territory being split from the Diocese of Périgueux. It was suppressed by the Concordat of 1801. Its territory passed to the Diocese of Angoulême. In 1854, the territory and title of the Diocese of Sarlat was reunited with the Diocese of Périgueux, forming the Diocese of Périgueux and Sarlat.

The seat of the Bishop of Sarlat was at the Cathedral of Saint-Sacerdos, in the town of Sarlat in the Dordogne.

== History ==
The Abbey of Saint-Sauveur of Sarlat, which was later placed under the patronage of St. Sacerdos Bishop of Limoges (670—c. 720), when his relics were brought there, seems to have existed before the reigns of Pepin the Short and Charlemagne. These two rulers, who came there on pilgrimage, were called its "founders" in a Bull of Pope Eugene III (1153), no doubt as a compliment rather than a declaration of historical fact. Charlemagne gave the monastery a fragment of the True Cross. In 886, the Emperor Charles the Fat, great-grandson of Charlemagne, restored the church of Sarlat and presented it with more relics.

About 936 Odo, Abbot of Cluny, was sent to reform the abbey. The abbey was visited in the spring of 1147 by Saint Bernard of Clairvaux, who had been sent to Périgueux on a mission of preaching against heresy by Pope Eugene III.

In 1154, with the accession of Henry II of England and Eleanor of Aquitaine, duchess of Guyenne and countess of Poitou, Sarlat came under the dominion of the House of Plantagenet, though in the 14th century they were again subjects of the French crown.

The abbey was made an episcopal see by Pope John XXII in a bull dated 13 August 1317. The last Abbot was Armandus de Sancto Leonardo (1312–1317). The first Bishop of Sarlat, Raymond de Rocquecorgne, O.S.B, was confirmed by the Pope in Consistory on 2 July 1318. In 1324 he was transferred to the diocese of Saint-Pons-de-Thomières.

On the eve of the French Revolution, the Chapter of the Cathedral of Saint-Saveur (or of Saint-Sacerdos) was composed of eighteen Canons, six of whom were officials of the Chapter: the Dean, the Provost, the Grand Archdeacon of Sarlat, the Archdeacon, the Archdeacon of Biron, and the Precentor. All of the Canons were appointments of the Bishop, who also appointed seven Vicars-General. There were three abbeys for men in the diocese: Cadouin (O.Cist.), Saint-Amand de Coli (O.S.A.), and Terrasson (O.S.B.). There were three collegial chapters, at Montpazier, Saint-Avit, and Biron. For women there was the Benedictine abbey of Fongauffier and the Priory of Auriac. Various religious orders also had houses or convents. The Poor Claires were established in Sarlat by the second Bishop Louis de Salignac on 21 April 1621.

During the Revolution the church of Saint-Marie in Sarlat, the convent of the Franciscans (Cordeliers), the convent of the Récollets, the convent of Nôtre-Dame, and the convent of the Mirepoises (Congrégation des demoiselles des écoles chrétiennes et de la charité, dites les Mirepoise) were confiscated and sold. Saint-Marie became a gun manufactory and arsenal. Today it is a shopping mall.

Under the Civil Constitution of the Clergy, the diocese of Sarlat was suppressed and subsumed into the 'Diocese of the Dordogne'. The electors of Dordogne chose Pierre Pontard, curé-archpriest of Sarlat to be their Constitutional Bishop. He was consecrated at Bordeaux by Bishop Jean Pierre Saurine. He was elected a delegate to the Legislative Assembly in Paris, and on 23 September 1793, when the Convention met, he repudiated his priesthood and declared that he did not believe in and could not make priests himself. He never returned to his diocese, though, to his credit, he did protect Bishop d’Albaret in Paris during the Terror. Pontard subsequently married. Another bishop was selected by the Constitutional Bishops in the province of Sud-Ouest, Antoine Bouchier, cure of Saint-Silain in Périgueux, but when his consecration was announced for June 1800, disorders were so great that it was postponed, and in fact had to be held in Bordeaux, on 2 March 1801. Bouchier died on 11 September 1801, ending the strife.

== Bishops of Sarlat ==
=== 1317–1500 ===
- Raimundus de Roquecorne (1317–1324)
- Bertrandus, O.S.B. (1324–1330)
- Arnaldus Royardi, O.Min. (1330- 1334)
- Guilelmus de Sandreux de Pedeveges, O.S.B. (1334–1338)
- Petrus Berenger (1338–1341)
- Itherius de Sandreux (1341–1345)
- Petrus Itier (1346–1359) (transferred to Dax)
- Elias de Salignac (1359–1361) (transferred to Bordeaux)
- Austencius de S. Columba, O.Min. (1361–1370)
- Joannes de Revaillon (1370–1396)
- Galhardus de Palayrac (1396–1397)
- Raymond de Bretenoux (1397–1404) (transferred to Périgueux)
- Joannes Lami, O.Min. (1408–1410)
- Joannes Arnaldi, O.Min. (1411–1416)
- Bertrand de la Cropte de Lenquais (1416–1446)
- Petrus Bonaldi (1447–1461) (transferred to Rieux)
- Bertrand de Roffiniac (1461–1485)
- Pontius de Galiaco (1486–1492)
- Armandus de Gontealto (Armand de Gontault) (1492–1519) (resigned)

=== 1500–1700 ===
- Charles de Bonavalle (1519 – September 1527)
- Guy d'Aydie (27 May 1528 – 1 April 1529)
- Jean de Rillac (1529–1530)
- Jacques de Larmandie, O.S.B. (1530 – October 1533)
- Niccolò Gaddi (12 December 1533 – 3 July 1545)
- François de Saint-Nectaire Senneterre, O.S.B. (3 July 1545 – September 1567)
- François de Salignac de La Mothe-Fénelon (23 October 1568 – 1579) (resigned)
- Louis de Salignac de La Mothe-Fénelon (9 March 1579 – 6 February 1598)
- Louis de Salignac de La Mothe-Fénelon (27 November 1602 – 22 May 1639)
- Jean de Lingendes (14 July 1642 – 27 September 1647) (resigned)
- Nicolas Sévin (18 May 1648 – 1657) (resigned)
- François de Salignac de La Mothe-Fénelon (31 March 1659 – 1 May 1688)
- Pierre-François Beauvau de Rivau (15 October 1692 – 23 October 1701)

=== 1700–1801 ===
- Paul de Chaulnes (6 February 1702 – 13 June 1721)
- Denis-Alexandre Le Blanc, C.R.S.A. (14 January 1722 – 3 May 1747)
- Henri-Jacques de Montesquiou-Poylobon (31 July 1747 – 19 January 1777)
- Joseph-Anne-Luc (Falcombelle) de Ponte d’Albaret (15 December 1777 – 20 May 1800)

== See also ==
- Catholic Church in France
- List of Carolingian monasteries
- List of Catholic dioceses in France

== Books ==
=== Reference books ===
- Eubel, Conradus, ed. (1913). Hierarchia catholica, Tomus 1 (second ed.). Münster: Libreria Regensbergiana. p. 436. (in Latin)
- Eubel, Conradus, ed. (1914). Hierarchia catholica, Tomus 2 (second ed.). Münster: Libreria Regensbergiana. p. 230.
- Eubel, Conradus, ed. (1923). Hierarchia catholica, Tomus 3 (second ed.). Münster: Libreria Regensbergiana.
- Gauchat, Patritius (Patrice) (1935). Hierarchia catholica IV (1592–1667). Münster: Libraria Regensbergiana. p. 305.
- Ritzler, Remigius; Sefrin, Pirminus (1952). Hierarchia catholica medii et recentis aevi V (1667–1730). Patavii: Messagero di S. Antonio.
- Ritzler, Remigius; Sefrin, Pirminus (1958). Hierarchia catholica medii et recentis aevi VI (1730–1799). Patavii: Messagero di S. Antonio. p. 368.
- Sainte-Marthe, Denis de (1720). Gallia Christiana: In Provincias Ecclesiasticas Distributa... Provinciae Burdigalensis, Bituricensis (in Latin). Vol. Tomus secundus. Paris: Typographia Regia. pp. 1508–1543.

=== Studies ===
- Bénéjeam-Lère, Mireille; Lefort, Jean-Maurice; Podevin, Bernard (1999). Sarlat, la cathédrale (in French). Bordeaux: Le Festin. ISBN 978-2-909423-66-1.
- Brugiére, H. (1893). Le livre d'or des diocc̀eses de Périgueux et de Sarlat; ou, Le clergé du Périgord pendant la période révolutionnaire (in French). Montreuil-sur-mer: Imprimerie Notre-Dame des prés. p. 257.
- Carles, Jean-Alcide (1986). Les Titulaires et les patrons du diocèse de Périgueux-Sarlat (in French). Bayac: Éd. du Roc de Bourzac. ISBN 978-2-9500994-9-5.
- Escande, Jean Joseph (1903). Histoire de Sarlat (in French). Sarlat: Lafaysse.
- Jarry, Arthur (1916). Le siège pontifical de Périgueux et Sarlat. Nos évêques (in French). Périgueux: E. Ribes.
- Jean, Armand, SJ (1891). Les évêques et les archevêques de France depuis 1682 jusqu'à 1801 (in French). Paris: A. Picard. pp. 156–160.
- Maubourguet, Jean (1955). Sarlat et le Périgord méridional (in French). Vol. Tome III. 1453–1547. Périgueux: Société historique et archéologique du Périgord.
- Penaud, Guy (2010). Histoire des diocèses du Périgord et des évêques de Périgueux et Sarlat (in French). Saint-Pierre-d'Eyraud: Lafont Éd. Impressions. ISBN 978-2-917494-13-4.
- Tarde, Jean (1887). de Garard, Gaston (comte) (ed.). Les chroniques de Jean Tarde [1561-1636]: chanoine théologal et vicaire général de Sarlat, contenant l'histoire religieuse et politique de la ville et du diocèse de Sarlat (in French). Paris: Oudin.
