= Austentius =

Austentius (died 1370), known in French as Austence de Sainte-Colombe, was a Franciscan theologian and the bishop of Sarlat from 1361 until his death.

He was a professor at the University of Paris before becoming bishop. He wrote two preaching aids and two commentaries. He was a renowned preacher and several of his sermons survive.

His episcopate fell during the Hundred Years' War and he took the side of the English, whom he served on two occasions as a diplomat. He had the greatest admiration for Edward, the Black Prince, ruler of Aquitaine, to the point that he was accused before the pope of blasphemy in his praise of the prince.

== Theologian ==
De arte sermocinandi attributed to Astazius in a 15th-century manuscript

Austentius was a native of Sainte-Colombe in the Périgord. In 1352, he was a master of theology teaching at the University of Paris. The monk Aymeric de Peyrac, who knew and admired him, describes him as "a great and famous theologian, discreet in temporal and spiritual affairs and richly endowed with worldly wealth". Bartholomew of Pisa affirms his fame among scholars and calls his sermons erudite and pleasant to hear.

Four written works by Austentius are known as well as many sermons, all in Latin. One is an ars praedicandi, a technical manual on sermon composition, known under the title De arte sermocinandi. In one manuscript it appears under the title Tractatus de colligendo sermones latinos; in another under Ars et doctrina faciendi sermones. It has a complicated manuscript history, being preserved in a full and abridged forms both anonymously and under two different names. Austentius is generally thought to have produced an abridgement and adaptation of a manual by originally by Géraud du Pescher, an earlier generation Franciscan from the Périgord.

Austentius wrote another aid to preaching in his Distinctiones, an alphabetically arranged vocabulary for the user of sermon writers. A single copy survives, now Basel, Universitätsbibliothek, B. VIII. 15, but two other copies are known to have existed, having been catalogued in the libraries of the Avignon popes Clement VII and Benedict XIII.

Bartholomew of Pisa records that Austentius wrote a commentary on the Book of Revelation, but all that survives of this work are his comments on the first ten verses of the first chapter in a single manuscript, now Aix-en-Provence, Bibliothèque Méjanes, 1312.

Austentius's best preserved work after De arte sermocinandi is his principium, an introduction to Peter Lombard's Sentences. This work was read and used, since it is cited in at least one anonymous commentary on the Sentences. Austentius is the most cited author in that commentary.

Several of Austentius sermons are preserved across various manuscripts. They have a distinct and easily recognized style. (There are examples of sermons that seem to be deliberate imitations of Austentian style.) Several sermons are contained in a collection of others from the University of Paris and addressed to students and faculty in a Parisian manuscript. The manuscript in the Bibliothèque Méjanes with his commentary on Revelation contains one of these on Saint Catherine and also another on the occasion of the archbishop of Bordeaux's entrance. More sermons are found in manuscripts from Prague and Graz. An indication of Austentius's classical learning is found in the references in his sermons to Agamemnon, Homer, Socrates, Plato, Aristotle, Seneca and Cicero.

== Bishop ==
On 24 September 1261, the bishop of Sarlat, Hélie de Salignac, was transferred to the archdiocese of Bordeaux and Austentius was appointed in his place. The latter's episcopate fell during the rule of the Black Prince over the principality of Aquitaine and he maintained a close friendship with the prince and his father, King Edward III of England. In 1363, Edward III sent him as one of his ambassadors to the court of King Peter of Castile. On 4 August 1363, he did homage to the Black Prince in person at Bergerac. The prince then sent him to Avignon to inform Pope Urban V of the creation of the principality of Aquitaine.

At a provincial council of the archdiocese of Bordeaux held in Périgueux in October 1365, Austentius preached a sermon before the 22 assembled bishops in which he "compared the same prince in certain things to the Son of God". An accusation was lodged against him with Pope Urban and he had to travel to Italy to defend himself. His accusers did not appear and the case was dropped. The episode is recorded in the chronicle of Aymeric de Peyrac, who claims to have heard it from Austentius himself. The Black Prince was himself embarrassed by the bishop's words, telling told a friend that nobody "ought to be praised in that fashion to his face, least of all a great prince, who might suddenly be brought low by a stroke of ill-fortune." According to Aymeric, related the story to demonstrate the great wisdom of the prince.

Austentius renovated the parish church of Sainte-Marie de Sarlat so that the consuls of Sarlat would be well disposed to the English. However, he delayed work on the transformation of the old abbey church into Sarlat Cathedral.

Austentius received papal permission to make a will in 1367. He may have led the city of Sarlat in its resistance to the French in 1370. The city negotiated its surrender after a siege of two months in June 1370. His death later in 1370 was perhaps hastened by the city's fall.

== Works cited ==
- Allain, Ernest (1896). "The Church of Bordeaux During the Last Century of the English Dominion (Conculded)". The Dublin Review. 118 (17): 63–78.
- Barber, Richard W. (1978). Edward, Prince of Wales and Aquitaine: A Biography of the Black Prince. Boydell Press. ISBN 978-0-85115-145-8.
- Benejeam, Mireille (2005). "Les vestiges romans de l'ancienne abbaye de Sarlat (Dordogne)". Archéologie du Midi Médiéval. 23–24: 221–246. doi:10.3406/amime.2005.1834.
- Caplan, Harry (1934). Mediaeval Artes Praedicandi: A Hand-List. Cornell University Press.
- Cenci, Cesare (1991). "Sermoni del mag. Ascensio di Santa Colomba". Antonianum. 66: 301–351.
- Charland, Thomas-Marie (1936). Artes praedicandi: contribution à l'histoire de la rhétorique au Moyen Âge. Ottawa: Institut d'Études Médiévales.
- Courtenay, William J. (2024). "Principial Cohorts at Paris in the Fourteenth Century". In Monica Brînzei; William O. Duba (eds.). Principia on the Sentences of Peter Lombard: Exploring an Uncharted Scholastic Philosophical Genre Across Europe. Brepols. pp. 431–471.
- d'Avray, D. L. (1978). "The Wordlists in the 'Ars Faciendi Sermones' of Geraldus de Piscario". Franciscan Studies. 38: 184–193. doi:10.1353/frc.1978.0012.
- Gérard, Gaston de, ed. (1887). Les chroniques de Jean Tarde. Paris: Alphonse Picard.
- Maubourguet, Jean (1926). Le Périgord méridional des origines à l'an 1370: Étude d'histoire politique et religieuse. A. Coueslant.
- Pépin, Guilhem (2006). "Towards a New Assessment of the Black Prince's Principality of Aquitaine: A Study of the Last Years (1369–1372)". Nottingham Medieval Studies. 50: 59–114. doi:10.1484/J.NMS.3.394.
- Piron, Sylvain (2012). "Les studia franciscains de Provence et d'Aquitaine (1275–1335)". Philosophy and Theology in the Studia of the Religious Orders and at the Papal and Royal Courts: Acts of the XVth International Colloquium of the Société Internationale pour l'Étude de la Philosophie Médiévale, University of Notre Dame, 8–10 October 2008. Brill. pp. 303–358.
- Tachau, Katherine H. (1984). "French Theology in the Mid-Fourteenth Century: Vatican Latin 986 and Wrocƚaw, Milich F. 64". Archives d'histoire doctrinale et littéraire du Moyen Âge. 51: 41–80. JSTOR 44403765.
