= François Fournier-Sarlovèze =

French army officer (1773–1827)

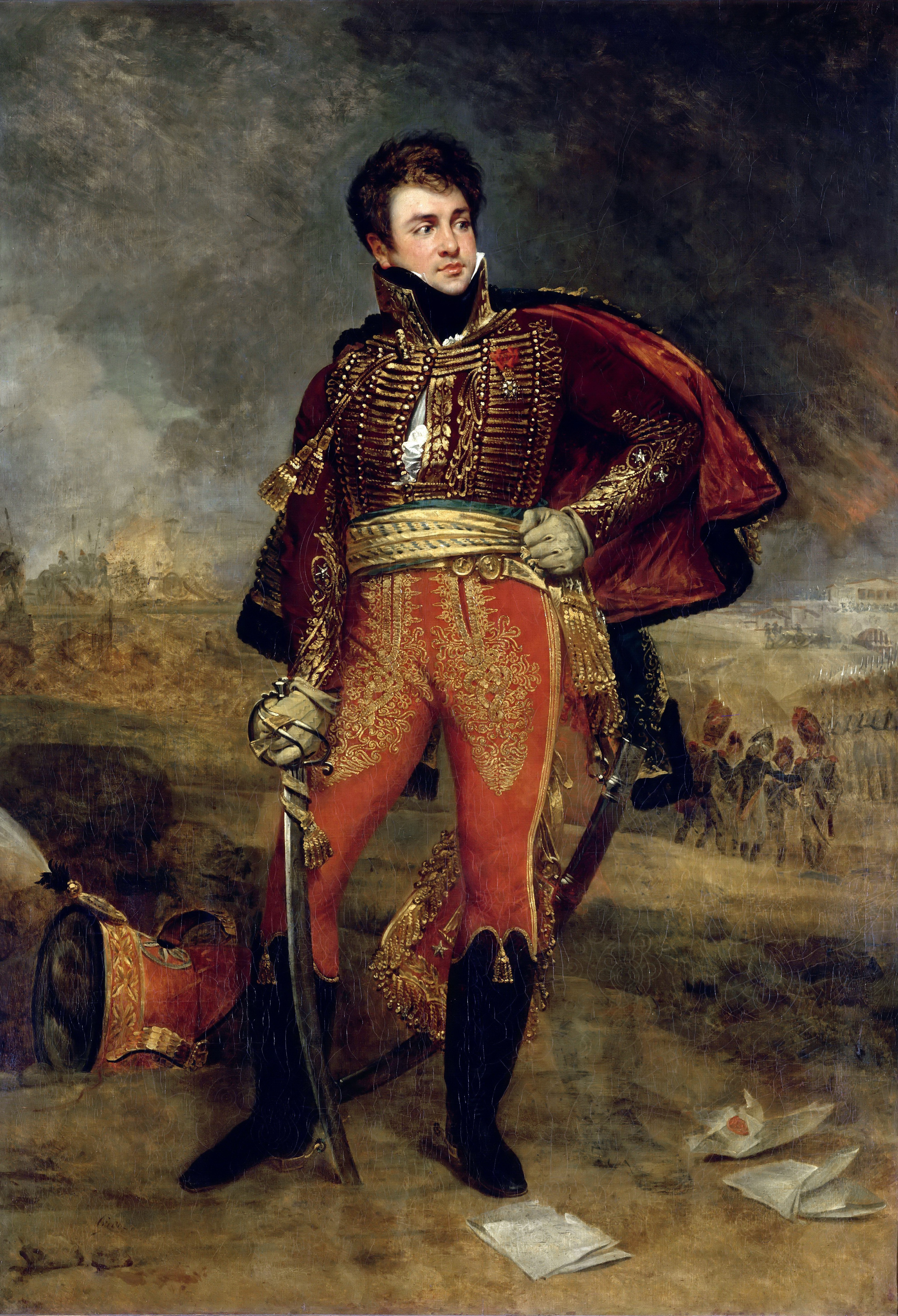
General François Fournier-Sarlovèze, by Antoine-Jean Gros, 1812, Musée du Louvre.

François Louis Fournier-Sarlovèze (6 September 1773 – 18 January 1827) was a French general of the Napoleonic Wars.

== Biography ==
Born in Sarlat in 1773, his father owned a cabaret. In his youth, he received solid instruction by the monks of his hometown and became a clerk of the prosecutor. In 1791, he went to Paris and entered the army, and the following year became second lieutenant of the Ninth Dragoons. Posted to the Army of the Alps, he distinguished himself through his extreme Jacobinist political opinions so that, after Robespierre’s death, he was deprived of his rank and imprisoned in Lyon. He succeeded in escaping prison and was reinstated in the Army of the North, and afterwards in the Army of Sambre-et-Meuse.

In The Encyclopedia of the Sword, Nick Evangelista wrote:

As a young officer in Napoleon's Army, Dupont was ordered to deliver a disagreeable message to a fellow officer, Fournier, a rabid duellist. Fournier, taking out his subsequent rage on the messenger, challenged Dupont to a duel. This sparked a succession of encounters, waged with sword and pistol, that spanned decades. The contest was eventually resolved when Dupont was able to overcome Fournier in a pistol duel, forcing him to promise never to bother him again.

They fought their first duel in 1794 from which Fournier demanded a rematch. This rematch resulted in at least another 30 duels over the next 19 years in which the two officers fought mounted, on foot, with swords, rapiers, sabres and pistols. Again deprived of his rank because of financial dishonesty and absences without leave, he was reinstated once more and became the aide-de-camp of General Pierre Augereau. Involved in the curious affair of Donnadieu and suspected of conspiracy against the First Consul, Fournier was arrested in May 1802, and imprisoned in the Temple, and later in Périgueux under house arrest.

=== In Spain ===
In April 1805, he was reinstated again as commander of the 600-man expedition of Rear-Admiral Charles René Magon de Médine in Martinique, but never disembarked and returned to France. Protected by Antoine Charles Louis de Lasalle, who found Fournier a good alter ego ready for any and all escapades, he became the commander of his staff and distinguished himself in 1807 in cavalry charges at the battles of Eylau, Guttstadt and Friedland.

Fournier was afterwards sent to Spain and between 18 and 23 May 1809, succeeded in defending the town of Lugo for five days with only 1,500 men against 20,000 attackers.

He attracted attention once more by giving some slashes of his sabre to an aide-de-camp placed under his orders by State Secretary Pierre Antoine Noël Bruno, comte Daru, a fact that caused him once again to be placed on leave without pay.

Since his services were needed, he set off again with the IX Corps of Jean-Baptiste Drouet, Comte d'Erlon. He distinguished himself once again in anti-guerrilla operations and in his charge of May 5, 1811, at the Battle of Fuentes de Oñoro, where, with his brigade (two squadrons of the Seventh, Thirteenth and Twentieth Chasseurs à Cheval), he penetrated and sabred three British infantry squares.

=== In Russia and Germany ===
During the Russian Campaign, he commanded the 31st Brigade of Light Cavalry, composed of the Baden Hussars, the Hessian and Westphalian Chevau-légers. He led a cavalry charge in the Battle of Smolensk. Promoted to general of division on 11 November 1812, Fournier served in 1813 at Gross-Beeren and at Leipzig where he led the 6th Light Cavalry Division in the III Cavalry Corps. He was appointed Count of the Empire, but deprived again of this rank on 26 October 1813, following a verbal dispute with Napoleon. In this notable episode, general Fournier was sent to the Mayence prison by Napoleon for his defeatist attitude, following defeat at Leipzig. En route to Mayence, his carriage was escorted by a detachment of Gendarmes d'élite and was attacked by Russian Cossacks. A gendarme was killed, but the general grabbed the sword of the dead man, took the reins of the carriage and with the help of the remaining gendarmes routed the Cossacks. He then returned to his seat and stated "Go on! To Mayence!".

=== Restored by Louis XVIII ===
Although Louis XVIII re-established him to his rank in the First Restoration, Fournier did not serve in the Hundred Days Campaign. In 1819, Louis permitted him to add the family name of Sarlovèze to his name and promoted him to inspector-general of the Cavalry. He also took part in the preparation of the new military code.

=== Death ===
Fournier-Sarlovèze died on 18 January 1827. His remains were brought back to Sarlat and lay in state for three days in Sarlat Cathedral. He was buried in the section reserved for notables figures, beneath a large pyramid-shaped funerary monument erected in 1859.

== In popular culture ==
The story of Fournier-Sarlovèze and Dupont was fictionalized in Joseph Conrad's short story The Duel (1908). Conrad's short story was adapted to film by Ridley Scott as The Duellists (1977).

== Sources ==
- Delpech-Laborie, Jean (1969). Le Général Fournier-Sarlovèze: le plus mauvais sujet de Napoléon, Paris, Productions de Paris, 192 p.
- Dupont, Marcel (1936). Fournier-Sarlovèze le plus mauvais sujet de l'armée, Librairie Hachette, Paris.
- Napoleon website
