= Siege of Sarlat =

Siege of Sarlat may refer to:

- Siege of Sarlat (1370), during the Hundred Years' War
- Siege of Sarlat (1587), during the French Wars of Religion
