= Carsac-Aillac =

- Commune
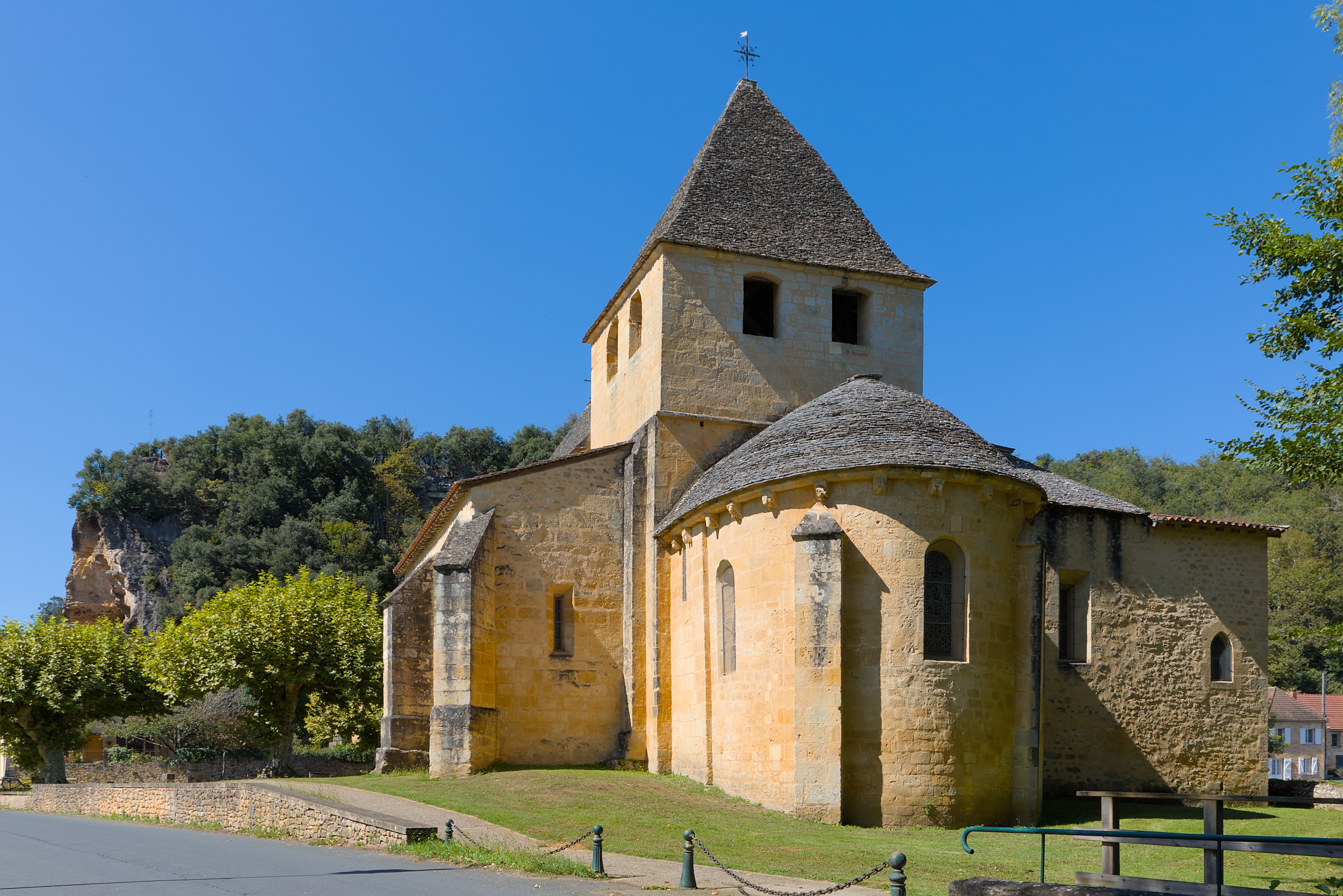
- The church in Carsac

- Coat of arms
- Location of Carsac-Aillac
- Location within France Location within Nouvelle-Aquitaine
- Coordinates: 44°50′27″N 1°16′37″E
- Country: France
- Region: Nouvelle-Aquitaine
- Department: Dordogne
- Arrondissement: Sarlat-la-Canéda
- Canton: Terrasson-Lavilledieu

Government
  - Mayor (2020–2026): Patrick Bonnefon
- Area^{1}: 17.31 km^{2} (6.68 sq mi)
- Elevation: 99 m (325 ft)
- Highest elevation: 269 m (883 ft)
- Lowest elevation: 60 m (200 ft)
- Population (2023): 1,586
  - Density: 91.62/km^{2} (237.3/sq mi)
- Time zone: UTC+01:00 (CET)
  - Summer (DST): UTC+02:00 (CEST)
- INSEE/Postal code: 24082 /24200
- ^{1} French Land Register data, which excludes lakes, ponds, glaciers > 1 km^{2} (0.386 sq mi or 247 acres) and river estuaries.

Carsac-Aillac (French pronunciation: [kaʁsak‿ajak]; Occitan: Carsac e Alhac) is a commune in the Dordogne department in Nouvelle-Aquitaine in southwestern France.

== History ==
=== Prehistory ===
The Pech-de-l'Azé caves are an archaeological site dating back to the Mousterian

It yielded a fossil skull of a young child from this period. It is a reference site for the regional Middle Paleolithic.

Another prehistoric site, the Pech de la Boissière site, located east of La Borderie, to the right of the road leading from Carsac to Sarlat, was classified as a Historic monument on March 16, 1927. This archaeological site has revealed deposits dating from the Upper Paleolithic period (from 45,000 to 12,000 BC).

=== Antiquity ===
While some traces of Iron Age occupation (polished stones, pottery shards) have been found on the spur of the Saint-Augustin rock, it is primarily the Gallo-Roman period that has left the most significant evidence.

The Saint-Rome site revealed a strong human presence dating from the late 1st century AD to the 4th century AD, notably with two buildings measuring 150 m^{2}. A burial ground from the Early Middle Ages located within these ruins revealed eleven graves dating from the mid-7th to the late 10th century.

=== 20th century ===
In June 1944, the town suffered repression at the hands of the SS Regiment Der Führer 4th regiment, belonging to the Division Das Reich, en route to the Normandy.

Map of Carsac-Aillac and its former constituent towns.

In 1961, the communes of Carsac-de-Carlux and Aillac merged under the name Carsac-Aillac.

== Population ==
Historical population
Year	Pop.	±% p.a.
1968	770	—
1975	782	+0.22%
1982	950	+2.82%
1990	1,219	+3.17%
1999	1,217	−0.02%
2007	1,466	+2.35%
2012	1,540	+0.99%
2017	1,578	+0.49%
2023	1,586	+0.08%
Source: INSEE

== Notable people ==
- Marius Rossillon, aka O'Galop (1867-1946), creator of the Bibendum Michelin, died in Carsac-Aillac.
- Solange Sanfourche, (1922–2013), alias Marie-Claude, was a French resistance fighter born in Carsac-Aillac.

== Sights ==
- Jardins d'Eau

== See also ==
- Communes of the Dordogne department
