= Jardins d'Eau =

Botanical gardens in Aquitaine, France

Coordinates: 44°50′27″N 1°16′37″E

The Jardins d'Eau (Water Gardens, 4.5 hectares) are botanical gardens located in Saint Rome, Carsac-Aillac, Dordogne, Aquitaine, France. They are open May to end September; an admission fee is charged.

The gardens are set above the river Dordogne, and contain 80 lotus and Nymphaea (Nelumbo) species, and a variety of aquatic plants including Caltha, Glyceria, Pontederia, and Sagittaria, as well as waterside plants including Cyperus papyrus, Gunnera manicata, Hosta, Iris, and Lobelia.

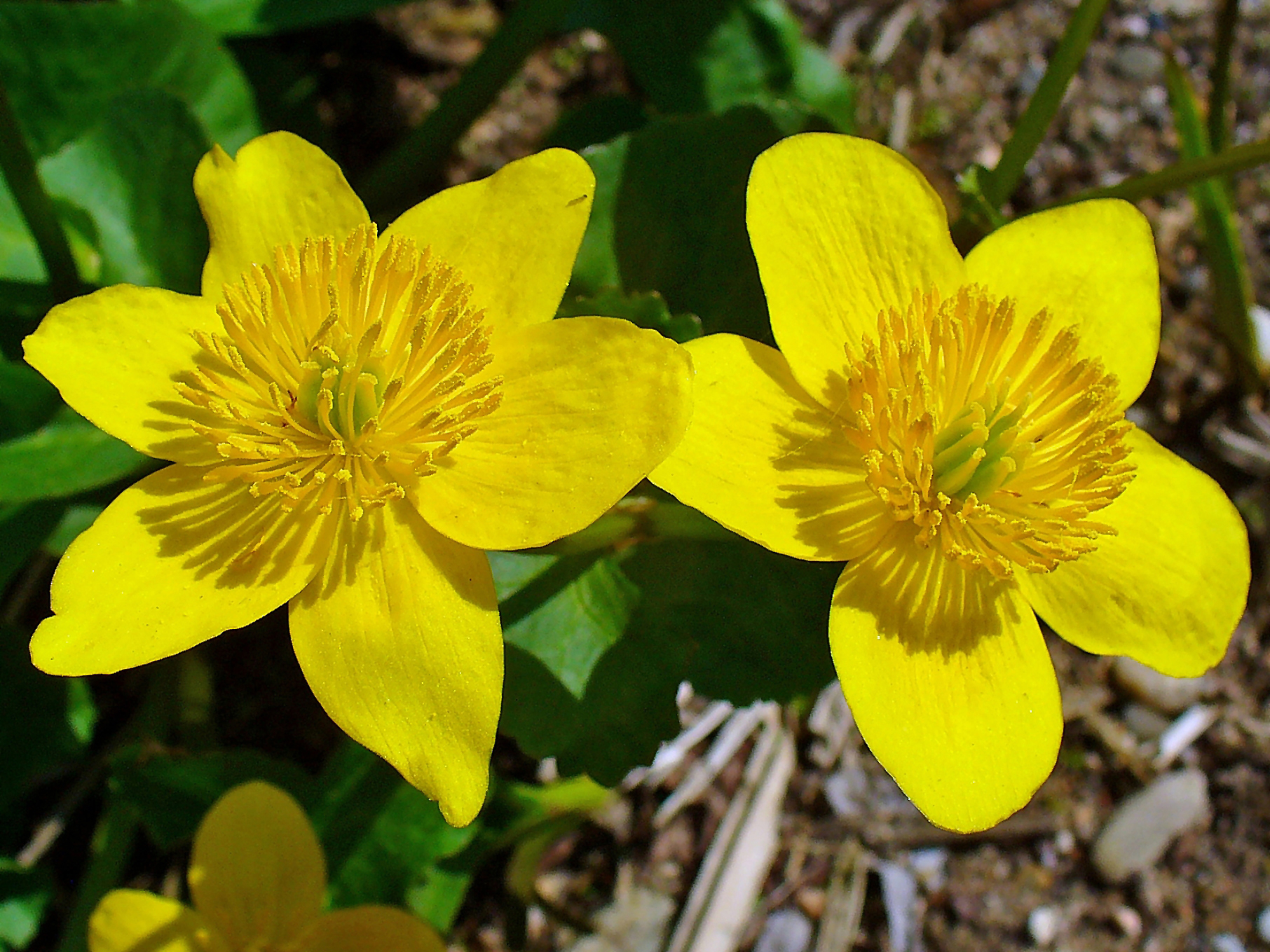
Jardins d'Eau

== See also ==
- List of botanical gardens in France
