= Pech-de-l'Azé caves =

Archaeoligical site in Dordogne, France

Coordinates: 44.859451°N 1.253279°E

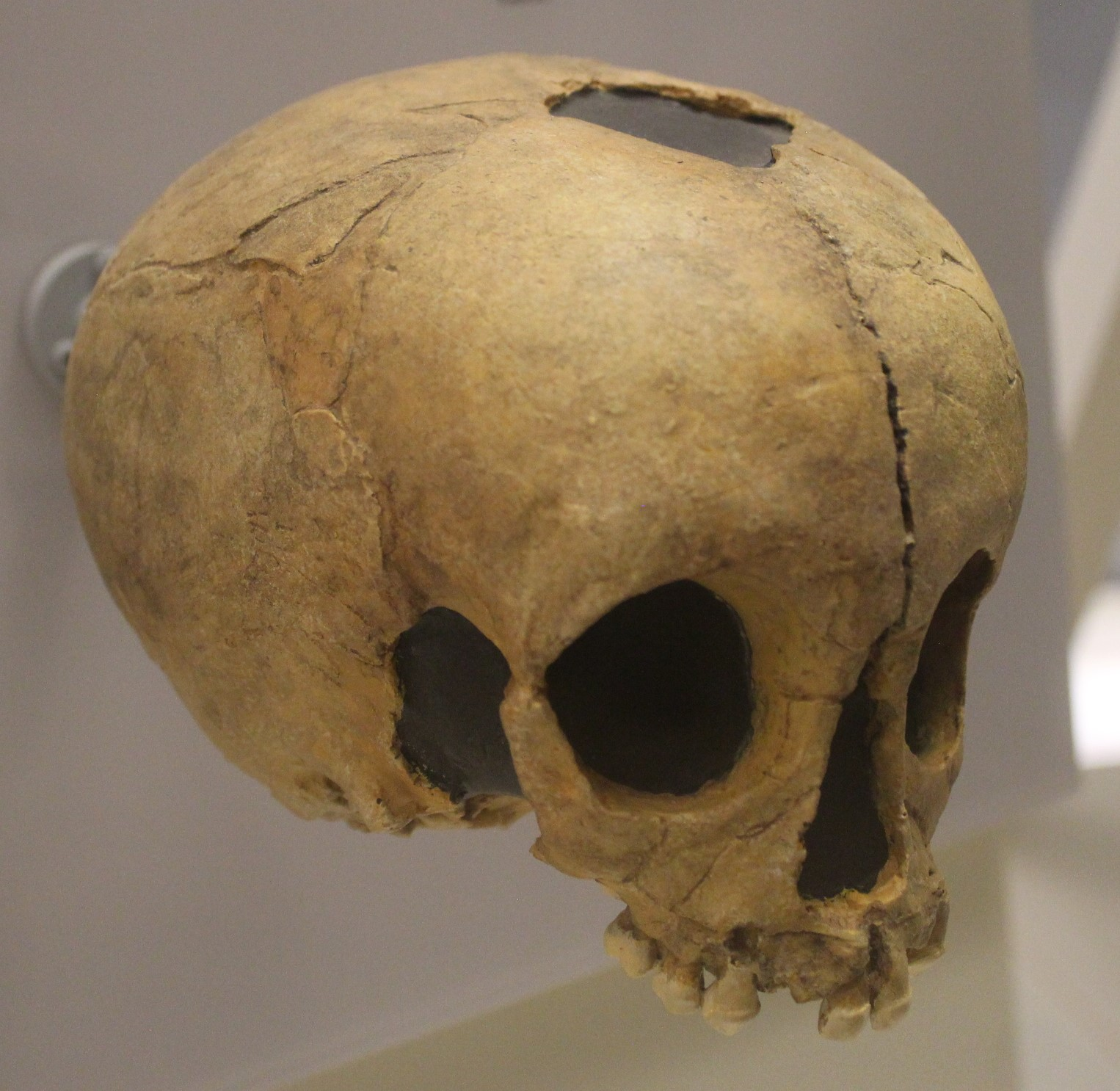
Homo neanderthalensis child found in the cave known as Pech I.

The Pech-de-l'Azé caves are a prehistoric site located in the French commune of Carsac-Aillac, in the Dordogne department, in the Nouvelle-Aquitaine region of France.

Pech-de-l'Azé I is a reference site for the regional Middle Palaeolithic.

== Description ==
The caves contain occupational debris from many millennia of intermittent Neanderthal occupation of the cave. This sequence of cave deposits begins about 80,000 to 90,000 years ago, and ends about 35,000 years ago.

There are four caves at the site labelled, Pech I to Pech IV.

Pech I , was the first of the caves to be discovered sometime early in the 19th century. Most of its archaeological record was then destroyed by treasure hunters. It is however notable for being the place of discovery of the skull of a Neanderthal child in 1909.

Pech II was discovered by the archaeologist François Bordes, in 1948. Part of the site had been demolished by the construction of a railway line in the 19th century. An occupational sequence from the so-called Meridional Acheulian, followed by a variety of Mousterian industries was discernable.

Pech III was discovered in 1951. It is a very small empty cave that is thought once contained a sequence corresponding to the earlier part of the Pech II (Bordes and Bourgon, 1951).

Pech IV is perhaps the most significant of the caves. It was discovered and explored by Bordes in the spring of 1952. It has a long sequence of occupations spanning a period of about 45,000 to 55,000 years during the last Ice Age (Pleistocene epoch). Its bottom deposit layers contain numerous hearths, which are not commonly found in European archaeological sites from this time period. The Asinipodian lithic assemblages are found here. These are an unusual combination of very small and very large flakes and cores. This type of Neanderthal assemblage is known only from Pech IV.

== See also ==
- Pech Merle - an unrelated cave complex at Cabrerets in the Lot département of the Occitania region in France which is famous for its cave art.
