= Géraud du Pescher =

Start of a commentary by Géraud on a papal decretal

Géraud du Pescher (Latin: Geraldus de Piscario) was a Franciscan theologian, preacher and canonist active in the 1330s.

== Life ==
A native of Puy-Saint-Front—the old quarter of Périgueux—Géraud had a close relationship with the court of Pope John XXII (r. 1316–1334). According to Jean de Roquetaillade, he advised the pope during the beatific vision controversy. According to the Legenda Aurea, he denied the doctrine of the Immaculate Conception in a sermon and was rebuked in a vision by the Virgin Mary while celebrating the Eucharist.

Géraud studied theology at the University of Toulouse. He received his master of theology and was granted a licence to teach in a papal bull issued by Benedict XII in 1335. He subsequently taught at the Franciscan studium in Toulouse.

== Works ==
Géraud's Ars faciendi sermones is one of the earliest artes praedicandi (arts of preaching) by a Franciscan author. It was adapted and abridged by Austentius, another Franciscan from Périgord. In this form it is known from several manuscripts. The original text is known from only one, Todi 57. It was edited by Ferdinand Delorme in 1944.

Ars faciendi sermones begins with the words Quesivisti a me. It is divided into eight main parts. Géraud claims to be writing in answer to the pleas of his colleagues for instruction in sermon writing. He answers in the affirmative his own question of "whether one can find some special technique in building collations and sermons". He denies that sermon composition can be learnt by imitation. His Ars aims to teach sermon technique.

The first six sections of the Ars faciendi sermones are largely conventional step-by-step instructions in composing a sermon of the scholastic type. The first concerns the choice of a biblical theme and how to state it; the second the division of the theme; the third subdivisions and distinctions, especially the four senses of Scripture; the fourth how to demonstrate the truth of a division from authority; the fifth sermon development; and the sixth the different types of sermons and the difference between apostolic and modern preaching. In the last section Géraud condemns the use of extended nonbiblical allegories.

The seventh is the longest section. It is subdivided into twelve chapters. It is essentially a wordlist, "a tool to help the preacher find the rhymes" for rhymed divisions. Rhyming was a popular method of keeping sermons interesting when the audience was one's fellow clergy. The eighth section is essentially a grammatical addendum. Finally, Géraud introduces some example sermons. Only one of these is known to have survived, although Bernardino da Siena had seen some of the others.

At Easter 1333, Géraud wrote the Lectura decretalis 'Cum Marthae', a commentary on the decretal Cum Marthae by Pope Innocent III.

== Works cited ==
- Briscoe, Marianne G. (1995). "First Part: Artes Praedicandi". In Marianne G. Briscoe; Barbara H. Jaye (eds.). Artes Praedicandi and Artes Orandi. Brepols.
- d'Avray, D. L. (1978). "The Wordlists in the 'Ars Faciendi Sermones' of Geraldus de Piscario". Franciscan Studies. 38: 184–193. doi:10.1353/frc.1978.0012.
- Delorme, Ferdinand M. (1941). "L'Ars faciendi sermones de Géraud du Pescher". Antonianum. 19: 169–198.
- Piron, Sylvain (2012). "Les studia franciscains de Provence et d'Aquitaine (1275–1335)". Philosophy and Theology in the Studia of the Religious Orders and at the Papal and Royal Courts: Acts of the XVth International Colloquium of the Société Internationale pour l'Étude de la Philosophie Médiévale, University of Notre Dame, 8–10 October 2008. Brill. pp. 303–358.
- Roest, Bert (2012). "Ne Effluat in Multiloquium Et Habeatur Honerosus: The Art of Preaching in the Franciscan Tradition". In Timothy Johnson (ed.). Franciscans and Preaching: Every Miracle from the Beginning of the World Came about through Words. Brill. pp. 381–412.
- Wenzel, Siegfried (2015). Medieval 'Artes Praedicandi': A Synthesis of Scholastic Sermon Structure. University of Toronto Press.
