= Solange Sanfourche =

French resistance operative

- Born: 18 July 1922; Carsac-Aillac (Dordogne), France
- Died: 12 June 2013 (aged 90); Sarlat-la-Canéda (Dordogne)
- Other name: Marie-Claude
- Occupation: WWII Resistance operative
- Spouse: Édouard Valéry (1924–2010)

Solange Sanfourche (18 July 1922 – 12 June 2013), alias Marie-Claude, was a French Resistance fighter in Dordogne during World War II.

== Life and work ==
She was born in Carsac-Aillac (Dordogne), France.

In December 1945, Sanfourche married in Périgueux, Édouard Valéry (1924–2010), commissioner of operations in the Dordogne region for the resistance movement during World War II.

Known by the code name Marie-Claude, she worked as a typist, secretary, mail carrier and liaison officer. During the German occupation, the Sanfourche family hid and housed dozens of clandestine freedom fighters in Périgueux who were wanted by occupying forces and the Gestapo.

Sanfourche died at 90 on 12 June 2013, in Sarlat-la-Canéda (Dordogne).
