= Sacerdos of Limoges =

French saint and monk

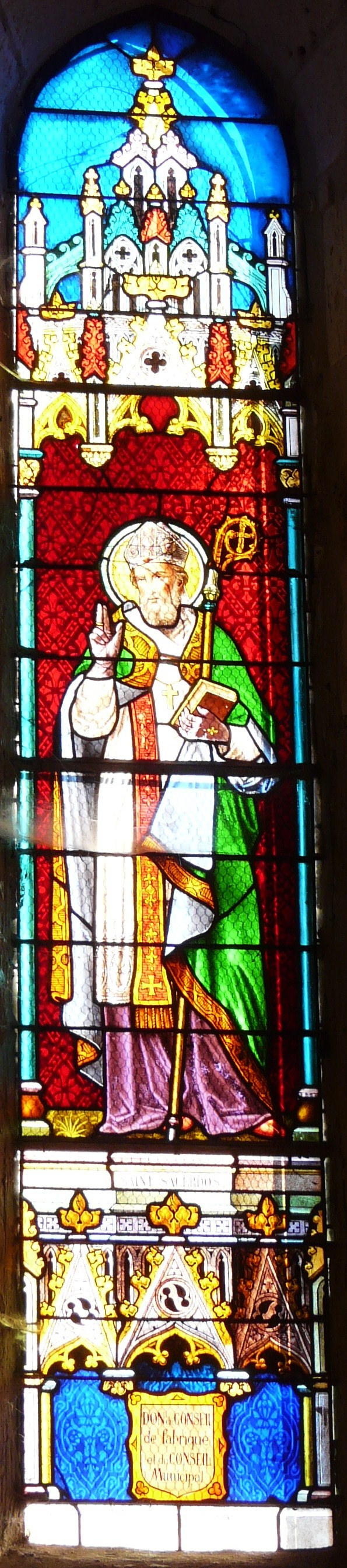

Saint Sacerdos (Sacerdos de Calviac, Sardot, Sadroc, Sardou, Serdon, Serdot) of Limoges (670—c. 720) is a French saint. He was born near Sarlat and became a monk. He was the founder and abbot of Calviac Abbey. He was later appointed bishop of Limoges and then of Sigüenza.

His mother was Saint Modane.

Sarlat Cathedral is dedicated to him.
