= Siege of Sarlat (1370) =

The siege of Sarlat in 1370 was a two-month long siege of the town of Sarlat by the forces of the French crown during the Hundred Years' War.

Hostilities resumed in the Hundred Years' War in 1369. At that time, Sarlat belonged to the Principality of Aquitaine ruled by Edward, the Black Prince. In the spring of 1369, Jaufre de Vayrols, the archbishop of Toulouse, wrote to the consuls of the town ordering them to surrender to Duke Louis I of Anjou and to send delegates to Cahors. None showed. According to Jean Tarde, the townspeople's sympathies were with the French but they were looking for a more opportune occasion to change allegiance. Possibly they feared English retaliation should they surrender without a fight. The sack of Limoges by the English in September 1370 demonstrates that such fears would have been well grounded. On the other hand, resistance to the French may have been led by the bishop, Austentius, a strong partisan of the Black Prince.

Early in 1370, the duke sent Taleyrand de Périgord to Sarlat. He stayed in the Franciscan convent outside the walls and held meetings with the consuls, but they refused to surrender. Taleyrand agreed to give them until fifteen days after Easter to make a final decision. This agreement was reached by 15 February, when it is recorded in an order of Gilbert de Domme, the seneschal of Périgord. The truce, during which Gilbert was ordered to cease hostilities with Sarlat, was to last until 16 April.

Taleyrand laid siege to Sarlat with an army of 3,000–4,000 men after the deadline passed and the town did not surrender. He was accompanied by Gilbert de Domme and Arnaud d'Espagne, seneschal of Carcassonne. As the siege dragged on for two months, the consuls negotiated at conferences in Montignac, Domme and Vitrac. The consuls finally agreed to surrender if the duke would confirm their liberties and release them from any debt they may have owed him. They city surrendered in June or July. It may have delayed its formal submission until some of the negotiated terms had been already implemented by the duke, which seems to have taken place as early as May. The duke himself visited the city in mid-August. He was accompanied by Bertrand du Guesclin and the count of Caraman. The bishop died not long after the siege.

A reenactment of the "battle of Sarlat" is a plot point in the 2023 mystery novel A Château Under Siege by Martin Walker.

== Source ==
- Gérard, Gaston de, ed. (1887). Les chroniques de Jean Tarde. Paris: Alphonse Picard.
- MacPherson, Karen (11 October 2023). "For mystery lovers, five new novels for your nightstand". The Washington Post.
- Maubourguet, Jean (1926). Le Périgord méridional des origines à l'an 1370: Étude d'histoire politique et religieuse. Cahors: A. Coueslant.
- Pépin, Guilhem (2006). "Towards a New Assessment of the Black Prince's Principality of Aquitaine: A Study of the Last Years (1369–1372)". Nottingham Medieval Studies. 50: 59–114. doi:10.1484/J.NMS.3.394.
