= Sarlat-la-Canéda =

Sarlat-la-Canéda Sarlat e La Canedat (Occitan)
- Subprefecture and commune
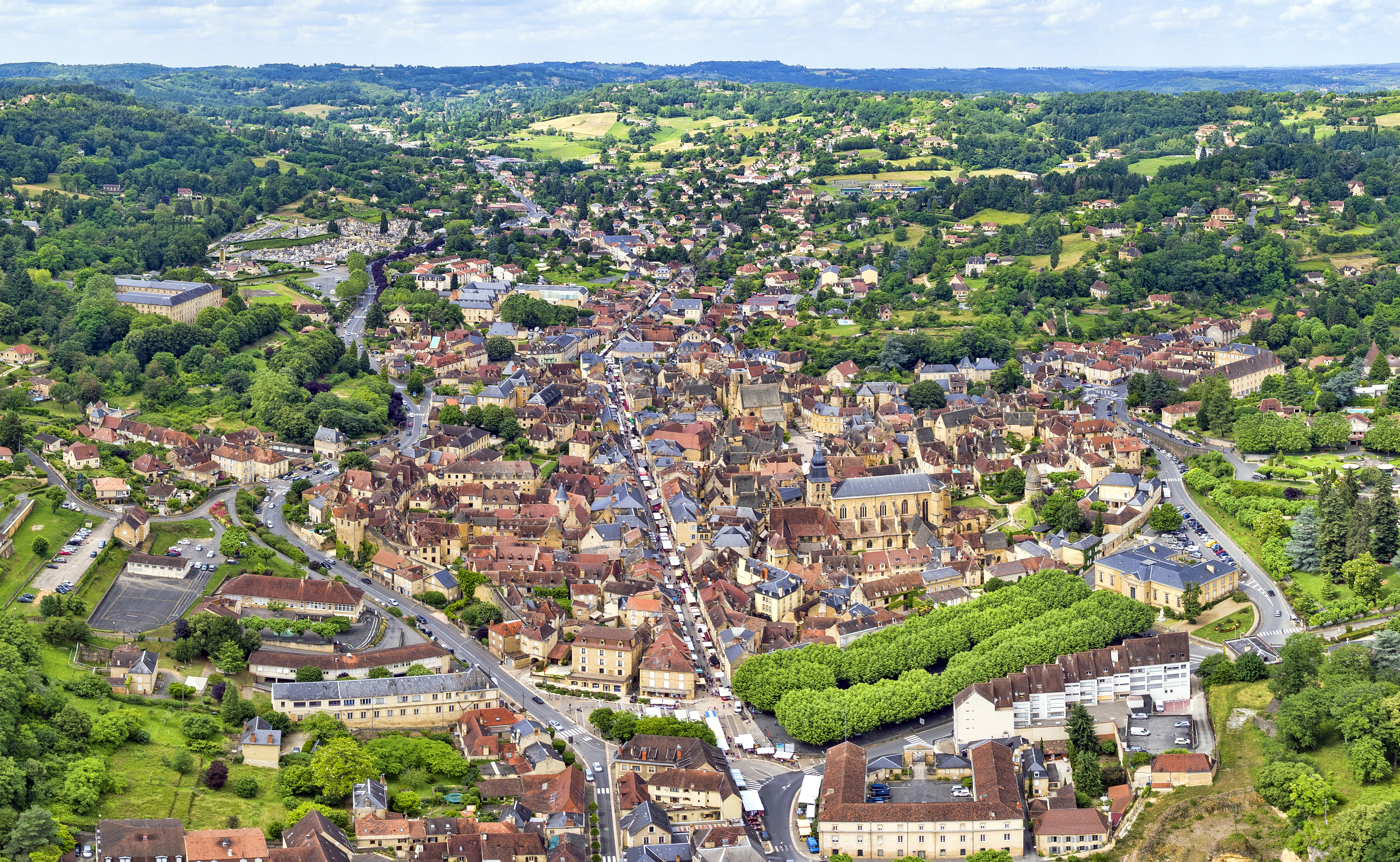
- An aerial view of Sarlat-la-Canéda

- Coat of arms
- Location of Sarlat-la-Canéda
- Location within France Location within Nouvelle-Aquitaine
- Coordinates: 44°53′34″N 1°12′55″E
- Country: France
- Region: Nouvelle-Aquitaine
- Department: Dordogne
- Arrondissement: Sarlat-la-Canéda
- Canton: Sarlat-la-Canéda
- Intercommunality: Sarlat-Périgord Noir

Government
  - Mayor (2020–2026): Jean-Jacques De Peretti
- Area^{1}: 47.13 km^{2} (18.20 sq mi)
- Elevation: 189 m (620 ft)
- Highest elevation: 319 m (1,047 ft)
- Lowest elevation: 102 m (335 ft)
- Population (2023): 8,763
  - Density: 185.9/km^{2} (481.6/sq mi)
- Demonym(s): Sarladais, Sarladaises
- Time zone: UTC+01:00 (CET)
  - Summer (DST): UTC+02:00 (CEST)
- INSEE/Postal code: 24520 /24200
- Website: www.sarlat.fr
- ^{1} French Land Register data, which excludes lakes, ponds, glaciers > 1 km^{2} (0.386 sq mi or 247 acres) and river estuaries.

Sarlat-la-Canéda (French pronunciation: [saʁla la kaneda]; Occitan: Sarlat e La Canedat), commonly known as Sarlat, is a commune in the southwestern French department of Dordogne, a part of Nouvelle-Aquitaine. Sarlat and La Canéda were distinct towns until merged into one commune in March 1965.

== Geography ==
The town of Sarlat is in a region known in France as Périgord Noir. It lies in the southeastern part of the Dordogne department, 7 km north of the river Dordogne.

Sarlat railway station offers train services to Bergerac, Bordeaux and Périgueux.

The commune is also served by Brive Vallée de la Dordogne airport (50 km), Bergerac Roumanière airport (70 km) and two bus lines.

== History ==
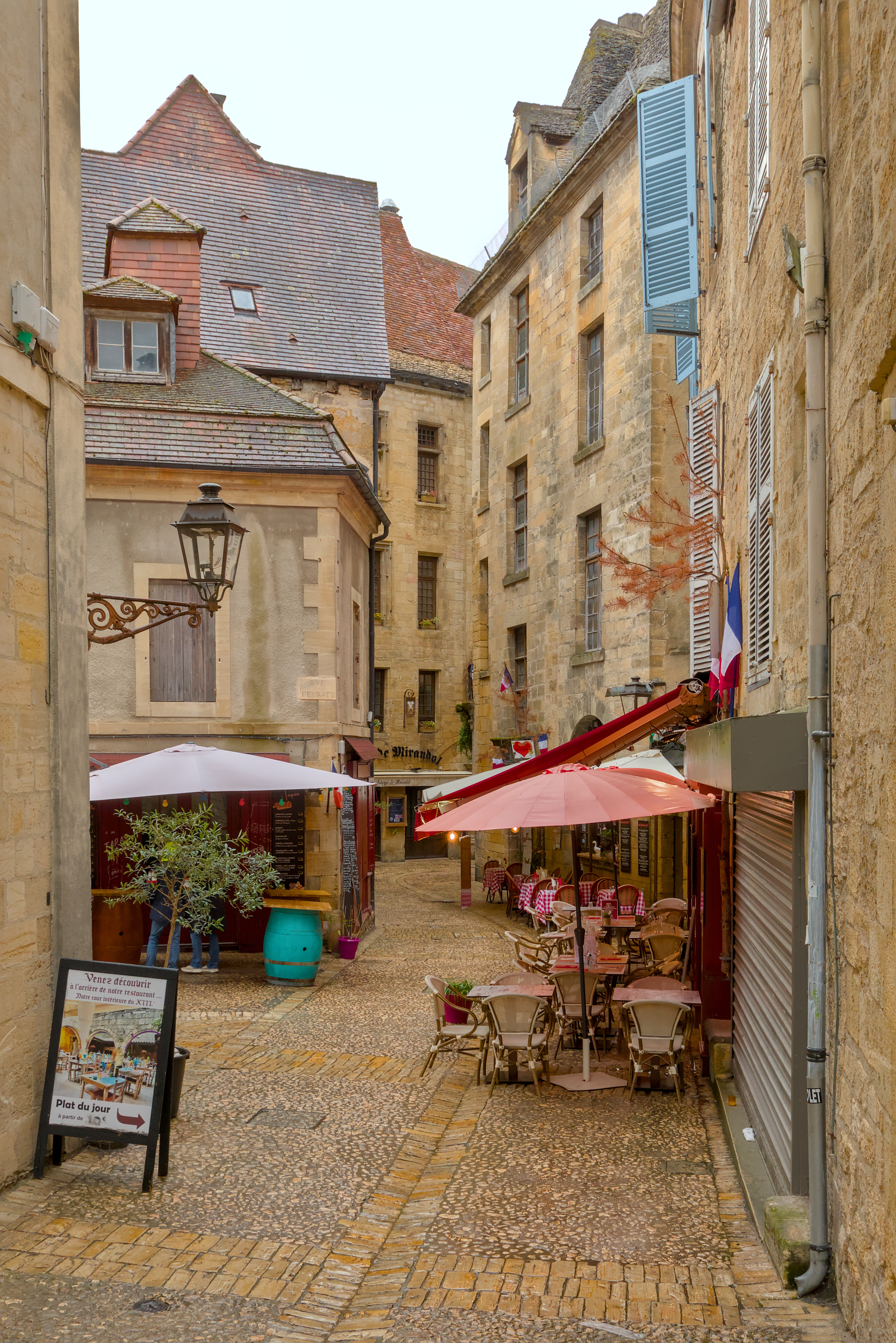
Rue des Consuls in the old town.

Sarlat is a medieval town that developed around a large Benedictine abbey of Carolingian origin. The medieval Sarlat Cathedral is dedicated to Saint Sacerdos. This abbey appears in records as early as 1081 and was one of the few in the region that was not raided by the Vikings. The name for the abbey church was Saint Sacerdos by 1318; in the 20th century, it would become a cathedral under Pope John XXIII.

Sarlat was besieged in 1370 by French forces during the Hundred Years' War.

Because modern history has largely passed it by, Sarlat has remained preserved and one of the towns most representative of 14th-century France. Its historic centre, with 77 protected monuments, was added to France's Tentative List for future nomination as a UNESCO World Heritage Site in 2002. The state of preservation can in part be attributed to writer, resistance fighter and politician André Malraux, who, as Minister of Culture (1960–1969), restored the town and many other sites of historic significance throughout France. The centre of the old town consists of restored stone buildings and is largely car-free.

== Population ==
Historical population
Year	Pop.	±% p.a.
1968	8,801	—
1975	9,765	+1.50%
1982	9,670	−0.14%
1990	9,909	+0.31%
1999	9,707	−0.23%
2007	9,381	−0.43%
2012	9,414	+0.07%
2017	8,869	−1.19%
2023	8,763	−0.20%
Source: INSEE

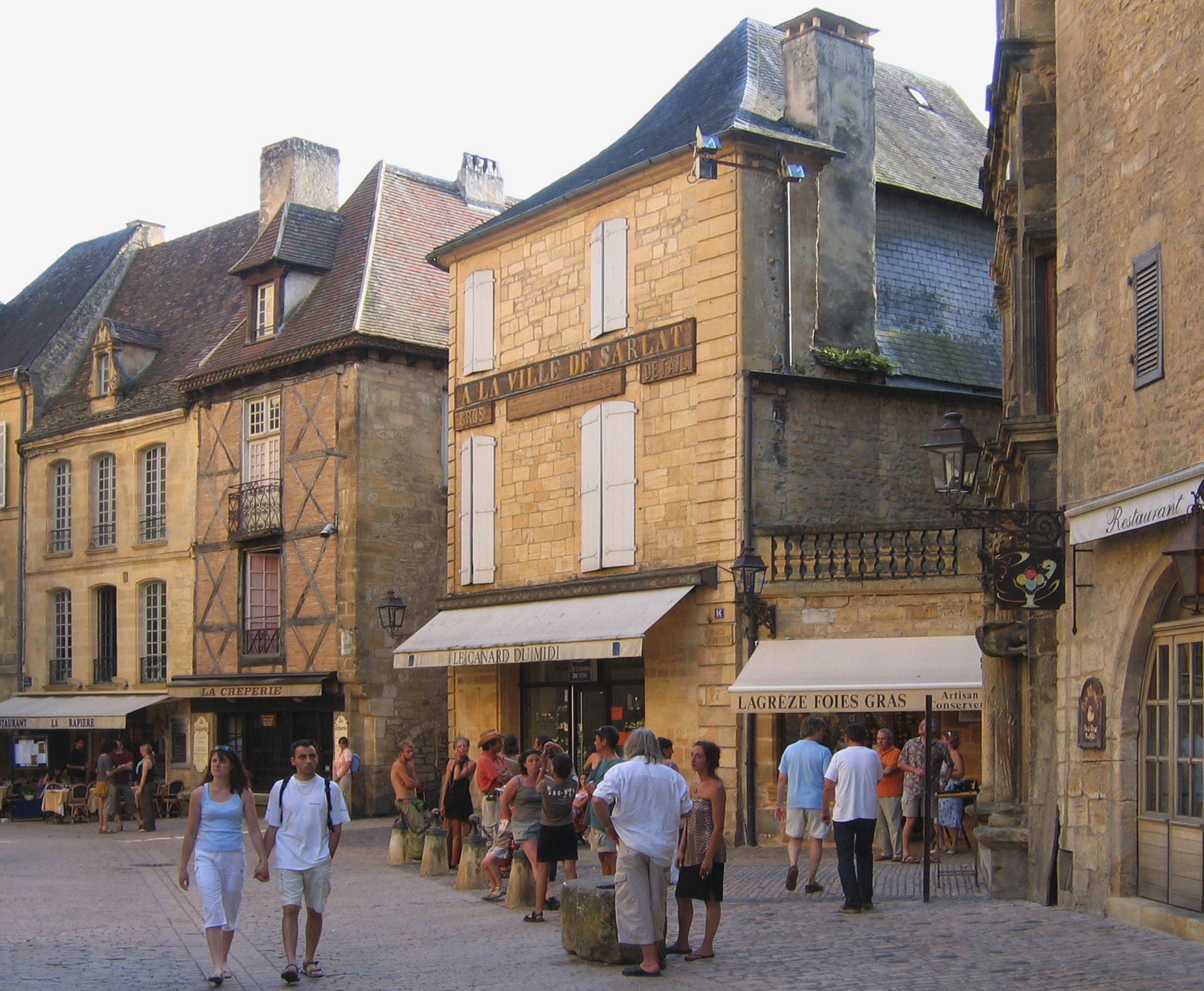
Place du Peyrou

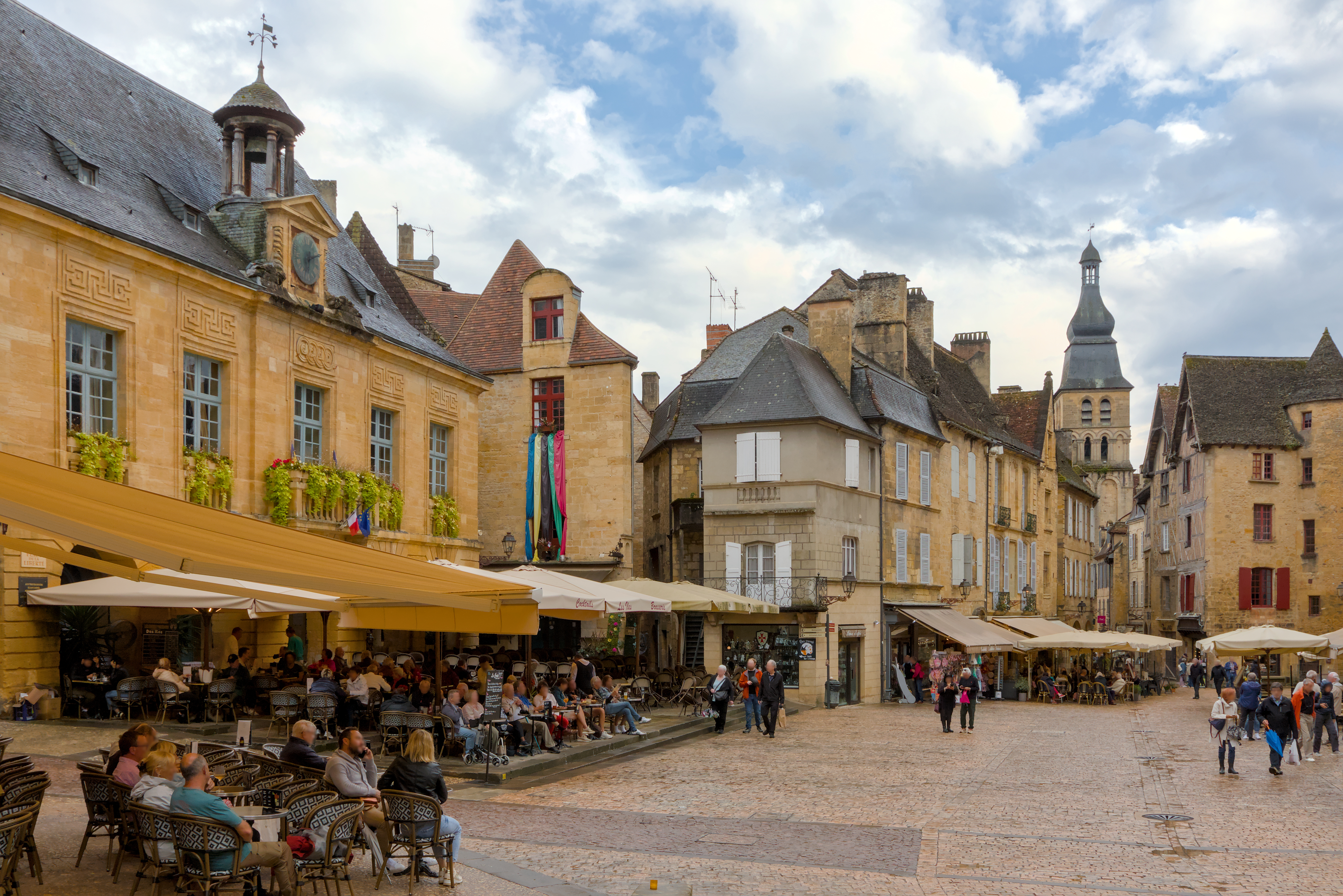
Place de la Liberté, the town's main square

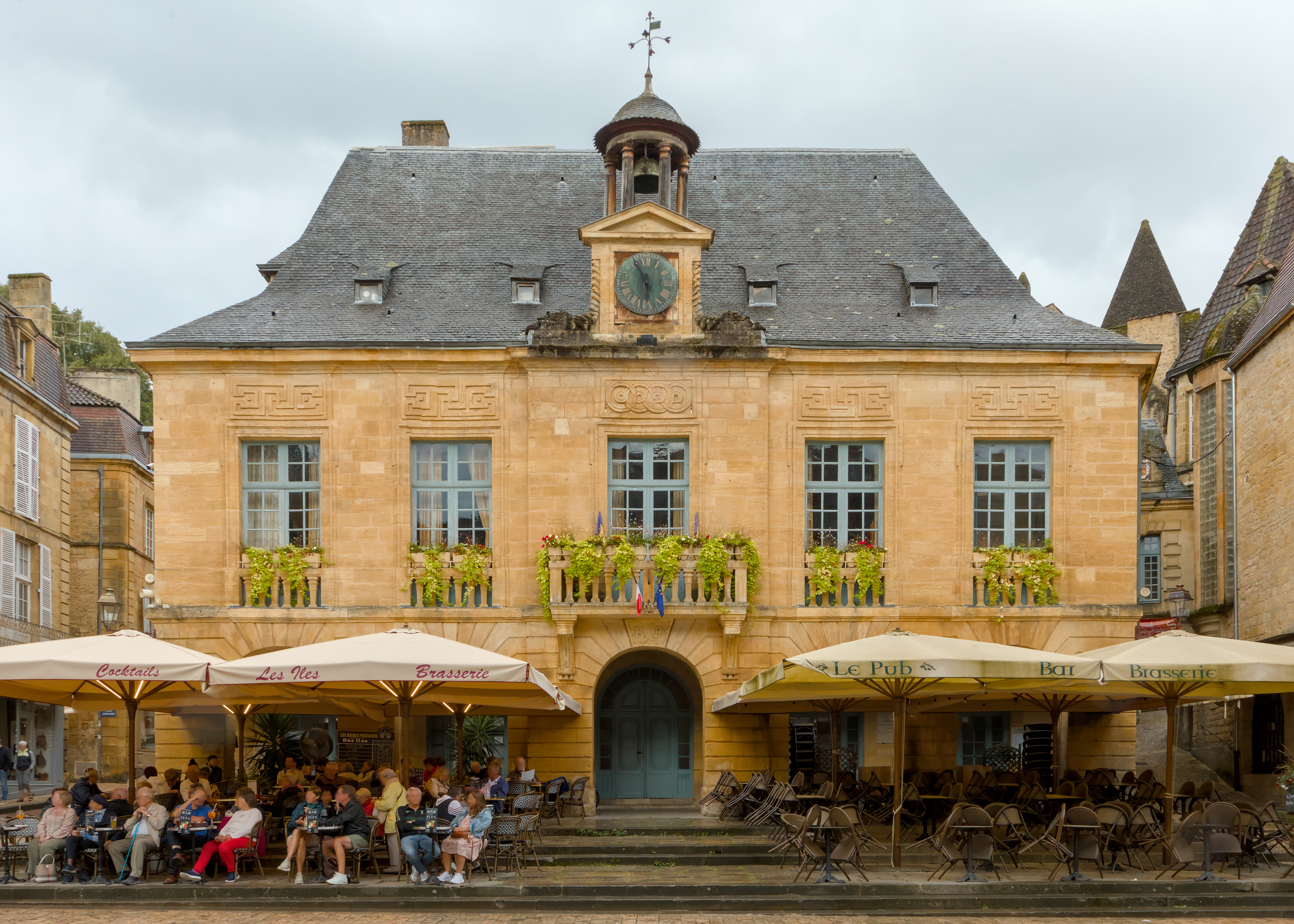
Town hall of Sarlat

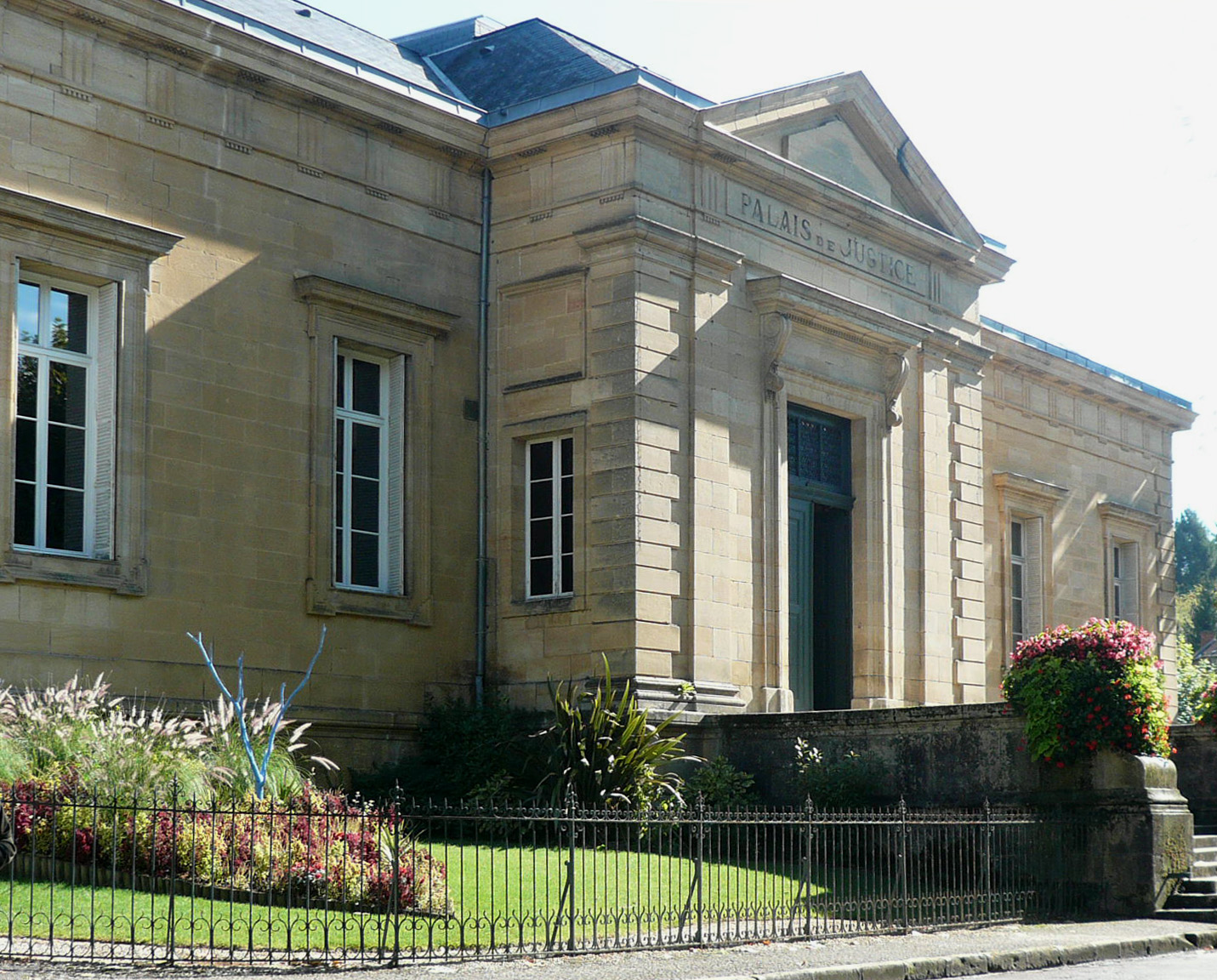
Palais de Justice

== Economy ==
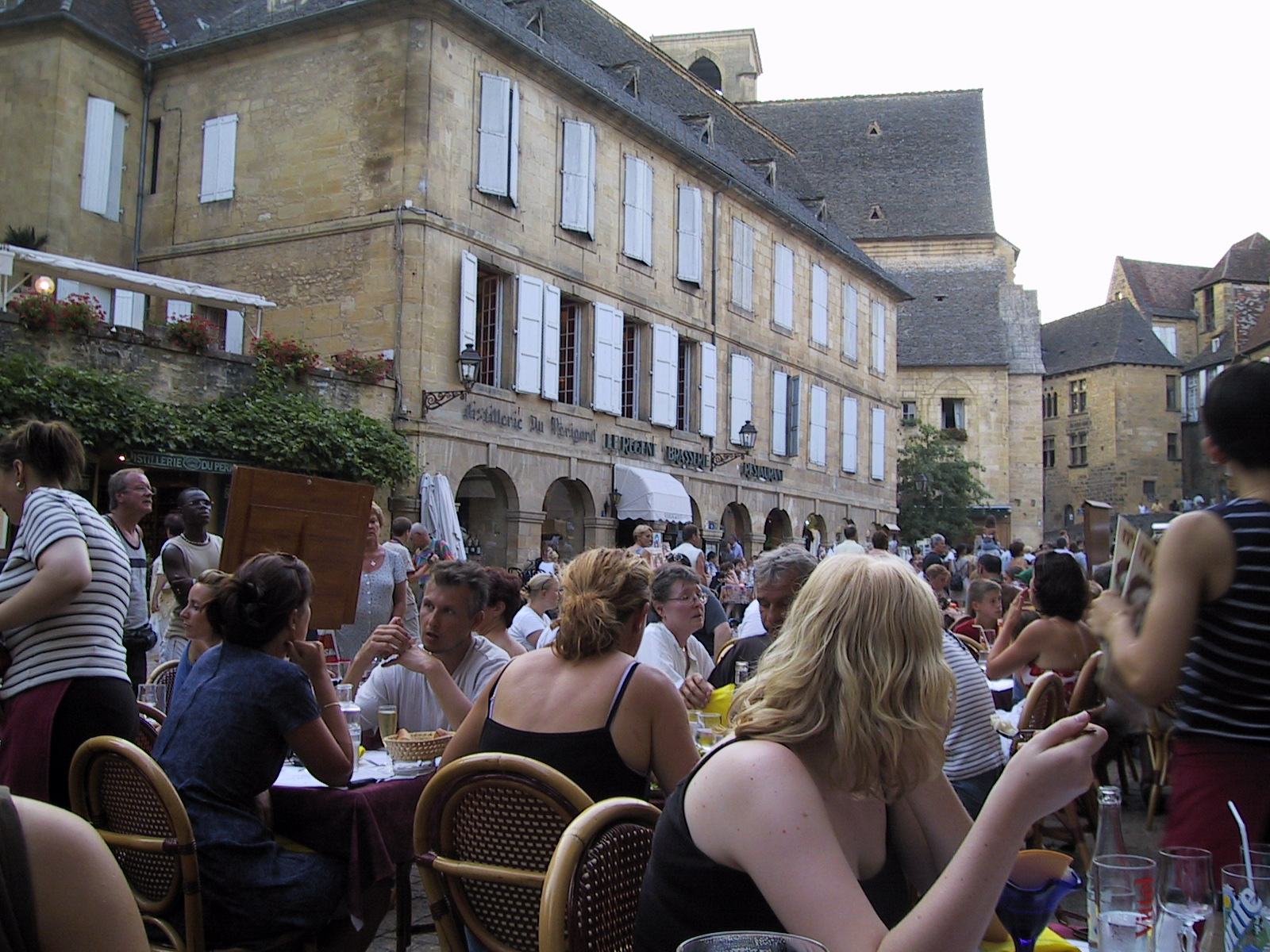
Centre of Sarlat on a summer's day

- Agriculture: Agriculture has long been of importance in the Dordogne area around Sarlat. Tobacco has been grown around Sarlat since 1857 and has historically been a major commodity for the area, although it is on the wane. Other agricultural commodities include corn, hay, walnuts, walnut oil, cheeses, wine, cèpes (a species of wild mushroom) and truffles.
- Tourism: Numerous visitors—especially from northern Europe (the United Kingdom, the Netherlands, Belgium, Germany, etc.)—come on holiday to Sarlat and the region surrounding it and some have settled there permanently. The months of July and August are traditionally the haute saison (high season) for visitors, as is true in much of France outside Paris.
- Foie gras: There are several large foie gras factories including Rougié, and many small producers of foie gras in the area; other farms raise geese and ducks to produce products (confits, pâté, etc.) from these birds. The commune holds an annual three day festival, "Fest'oie", in honour of this significant part of its economy which also attracts numerous tourists.

A film festival has been held in the commune every November since 1991. Other events include the Truffle Festival, Christmas Market and Fest’oie in winter, the Ringueta of traditional games, and the Theatre Games Festival.

== Notable inhabitants ==
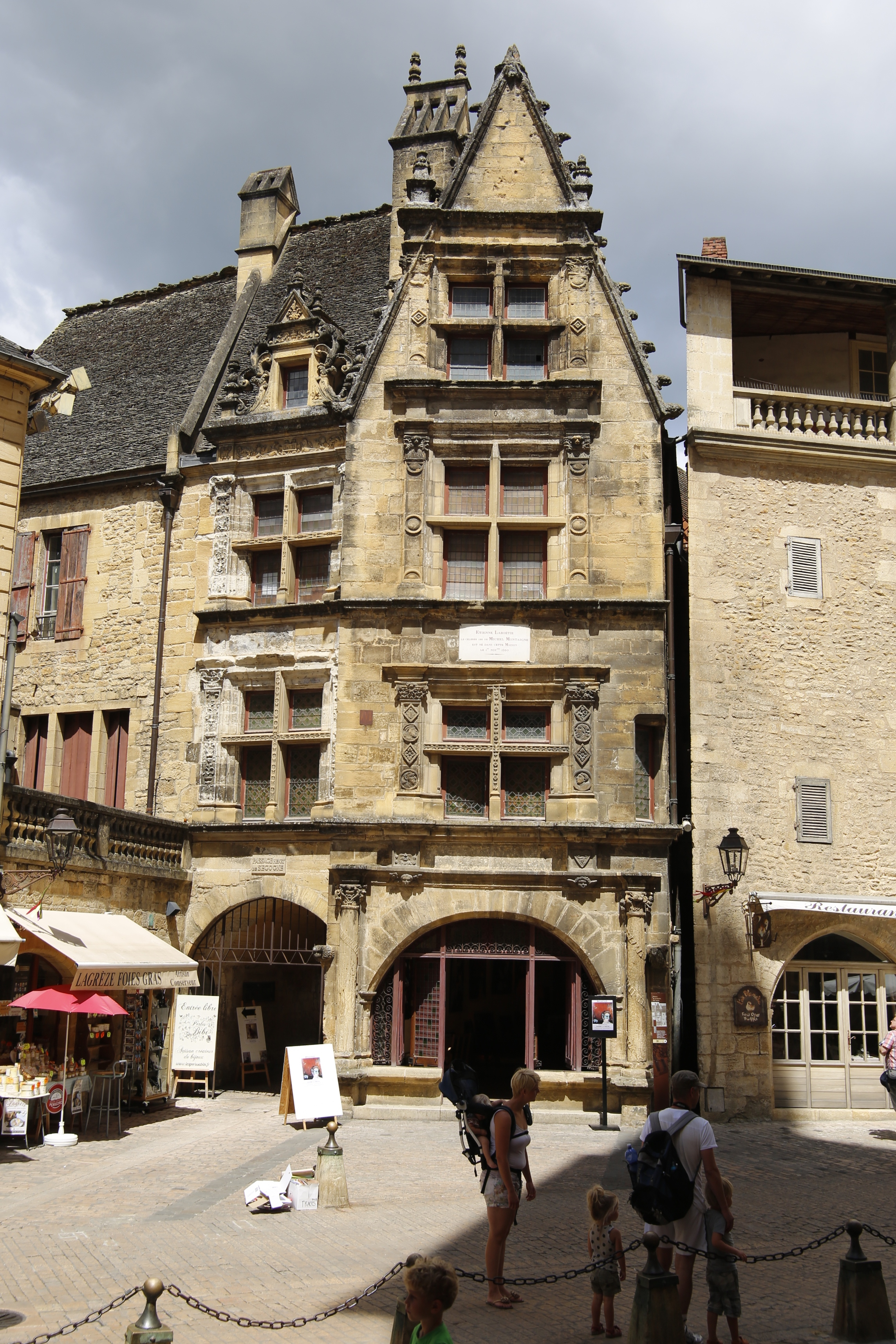
Former home of Étienne de La Boétie

- Étienne de La Boétie (1530–1563), judge and humanist poet remembered as the friend of the Renaissance philosopher Michel de Montaigne. He is the author of the Discourse on Voluntary Servitude, a philosophical essay that has become a foundational text in the history of political thought and the critique of tyranny.
- François Fournier-Sarlovèze (1773–1827), French general of the Napoleonic Wars
- Gauthier de Costes, seigneur de la Calprenède (c.1610–1663), novelist and dramatist
- Gabriel Tarde, judge and sociologist (1843–1904)
- André Malraux (1901–1976), a square and a gallery of paintings bear the name of the former Minister of Culture. This is explained by the fact that he is considered by many Sarladais as the saviour of the historical district of the city. While visiting Sarlat, he realised that the city was in danger of ruin in certain neighbourhoods and that some monuments were being destroyed. The Saved Areas Act was drafted to save the city.
- Jacques Géry (1917–2007), ichthyologist, died in Sarlat
- Solange Sanfourche (1922-2013), French Resistance operative, died in Sarlat.
- Jean Nouvel (born 1945), architect, spent his childhood in Sarlat and transformed the ancient church of Sainte Marie into a covered market with monumental doors.
- Guy Hatchi (1934-2017), was a French footballer.
- Jean-Jacques de Peretti (born 1946), mayor of the city since 1989.

== Cultural references ==
The town and region have featured in two major Hollywood films: Ridley Scott's The Duellists (1978), based on Joseph Conrad's Napoleonic tale; and more recently Timeline (2003), adapted from Michael Crichton's time-travel novel, and set in 14th-century France.

The pyramid tomb of François Fournier-Sarlovèze, who inspired the story behind The Duellists, is located in the cemetery of Sarlat.

Other films partly shot in Sarlat include:

- Ever After: a Cinderella Story (1998) by Andy Tennant
- The Musketeer (2001) by Peter Hyams
- Jacquou le Croquant (2007) by Laurent Boutonnat
- The Messenger: The Story of Joan of Arc (1999) by Luc Besson

The city also appears in the first instalments of French author Robert Merle's saga Fortune de France, which tells the story of a fictitious Huguenot, Pierre de Siorac, during the 16th and 17th centuries in France.

== Sport ==
- CA Sarlat is a French rugby union club founded in 1903.

== Climate ==
Climate data for Sarlat-la-Canéda (1995–2010 normals, extremes 1995–2014)
Month	Jan	Feb	Mar	Apr	May	Jun	Jul	Aug	Sep	Oct	Nov	Dec	Year
Record high °C (°F)	19.0 (66.2)	23.8 (74.8)	26.2 (79.2)	31.0 (87.8)	33.1 (91.6)	39.5 (103.1)	38.6 (101.5)	41.4 (106.5)	36.5 (97.7)	31.1 (88.0)	23.7 (74.7)	18.9 (66.0)	41.4 (106.5)
Mean daily maximum °C (°F)	9.5 (49.1)	11.0 (51.8)	15.3 (59.5)	18.0 (64.4)	22.0 (71.6)	25.8 (78.4)	27.2 (81.0)	27.3 (81.1)	23.7 (74.7)	19.1 (66.4)	12.3 (54.1)	9.5 (49.1)	18.4 (65.1)
Daily mean °C (°F)	5.8 (42.4)	6.5 (43.7)	9.8 (49.6)	12.4 (54.3)	16.2 (61.2)	19.7 (67.5)	20.9 (69.6)	20.9 (69.6)	17.6 (63.7)	14.1 (57.4)	8.4 (47.1)	5.7 (42.3)	13.2 (55.8)
Mean daily minimum °C (°F)	2.2 (36.0)	2.0 (35.6)	4.4 (39.9)	6.8 (44.2)	10.3 (50.5)	13.6 (56.5)	14.6 (58.3)	14.4 (57.9)	11.4 (52.5)	9.1 (48.4)	4.4 (39.9)	2.0 (35.6)	8.0 (46.4)
Record low °C (°F)	−10.7 (12.7)	−13.7 (7.3)	−11.1 (12.0)	−2.9 (26.8)	0.6 (33.1)	5.3 (41.5)	7.4 (45.3)	7.8 (46.0)	2.2 (36.0)	−4.1 (24.6)	−8.2 (17.2)	−11.4 (11.5)	−13.7 (7.3)
Average precipitation mm (inches)	71.9 (2.83)	58.8 (2.31)	69.0 (2.72)	87.8 (3.46)	79.7 (3.14)	57.2 (2.25)	63.2 (2.49)	63.0 (2.48)	65.8 (2.59)	71.7 (2.82)	91.6 (3.61)	74.8 (2.94)	854.5 (33.64)
Average precipitation days (≥ 1.0 mm)	10.6	9.9	10.5	12.4	10.7	7.8	7.8	8.6	8.6	10.5	13.7	12.1	123.3
Source: Meteociel

== Gallery ==
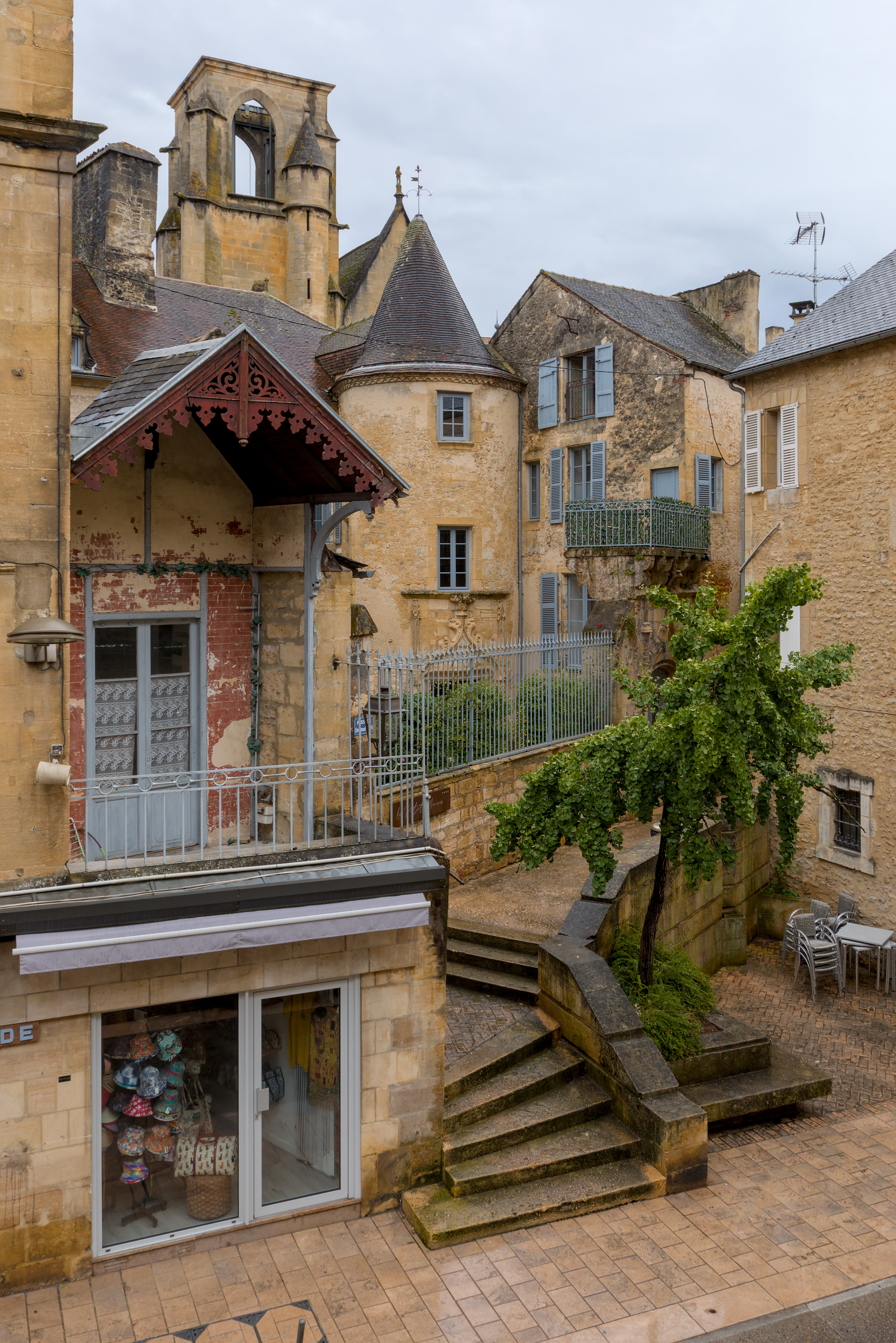
View of buildings in the historic center

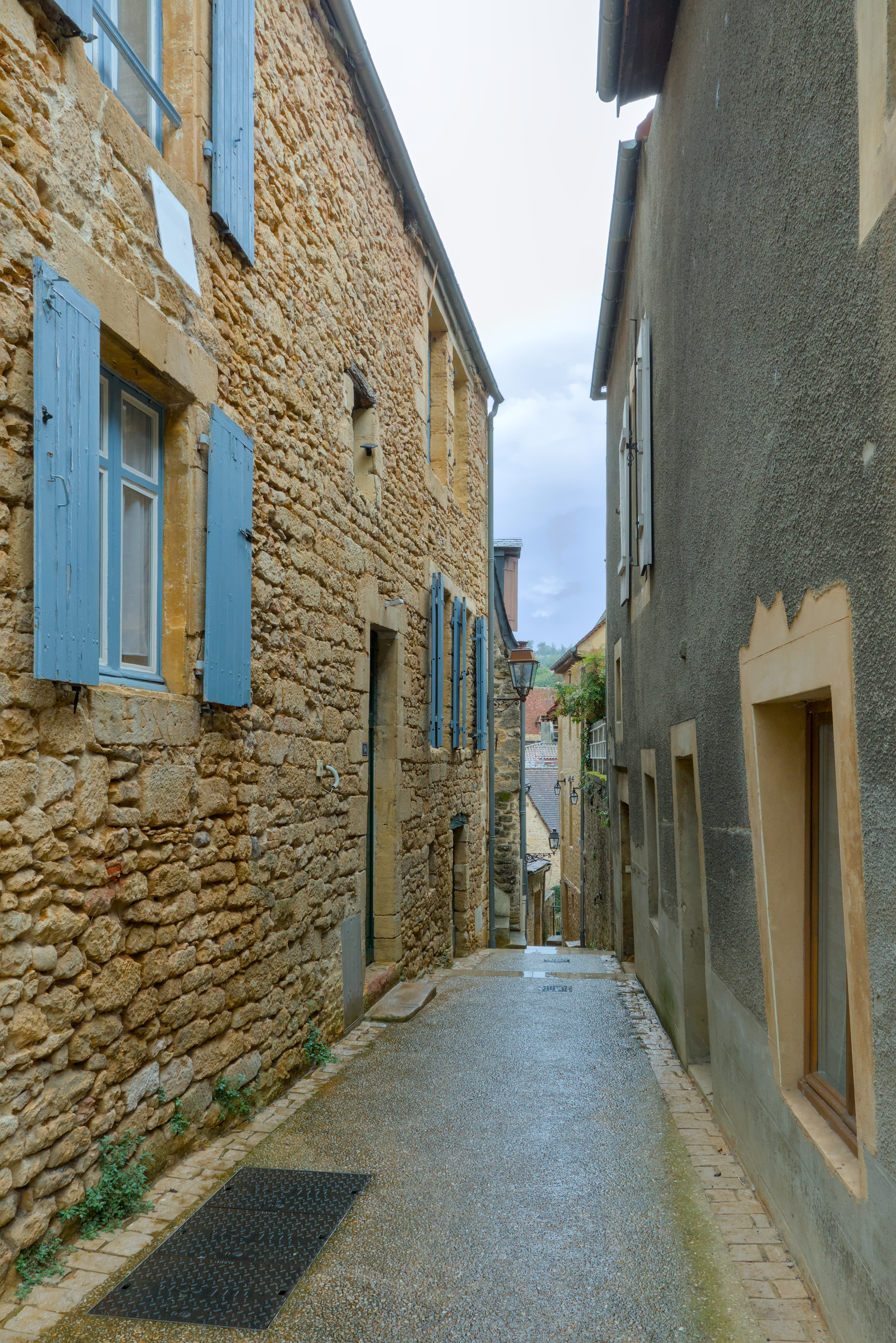
Papucie street, a pedestrian street in the historic center

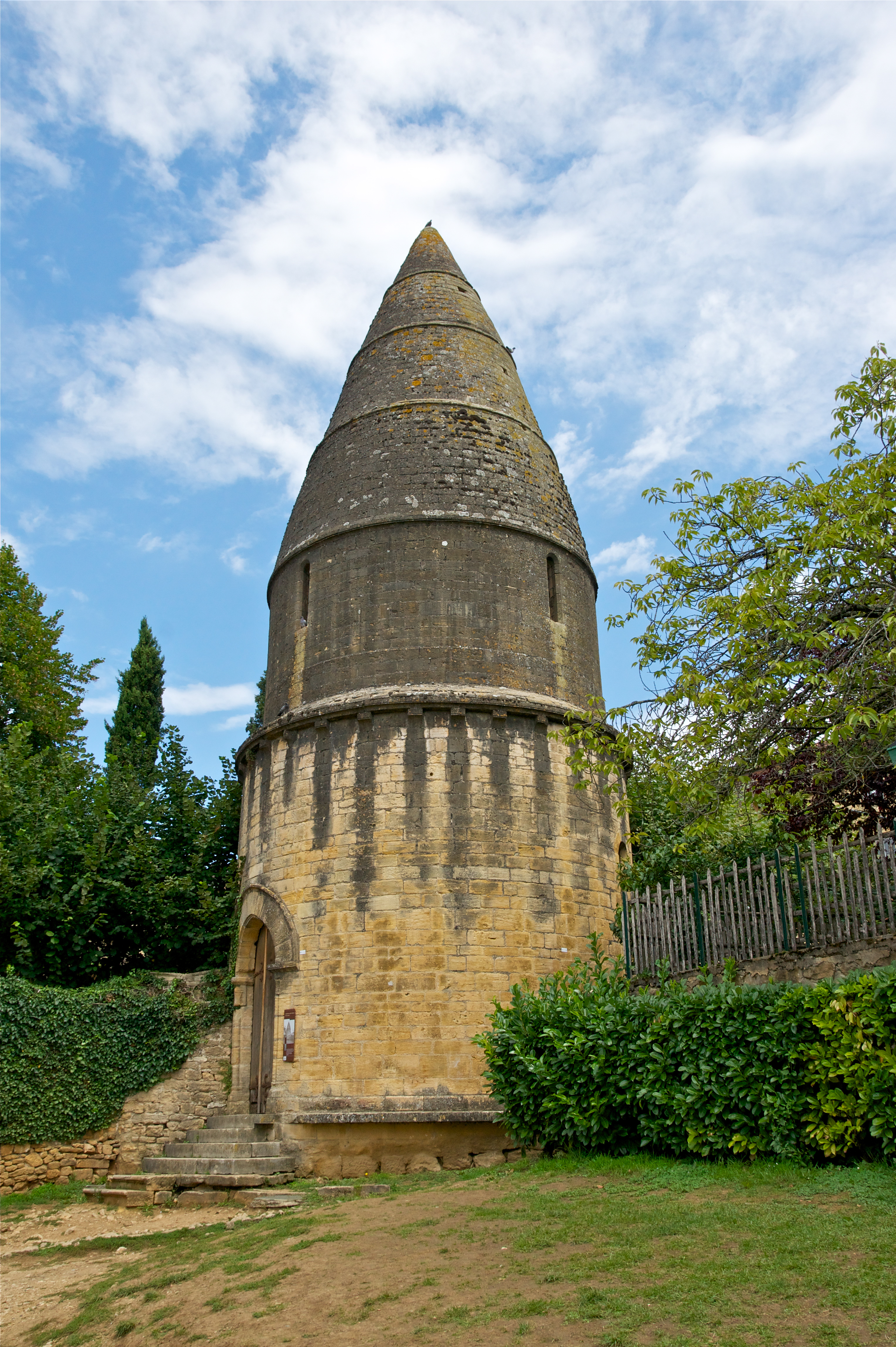
Lantern of the Dead

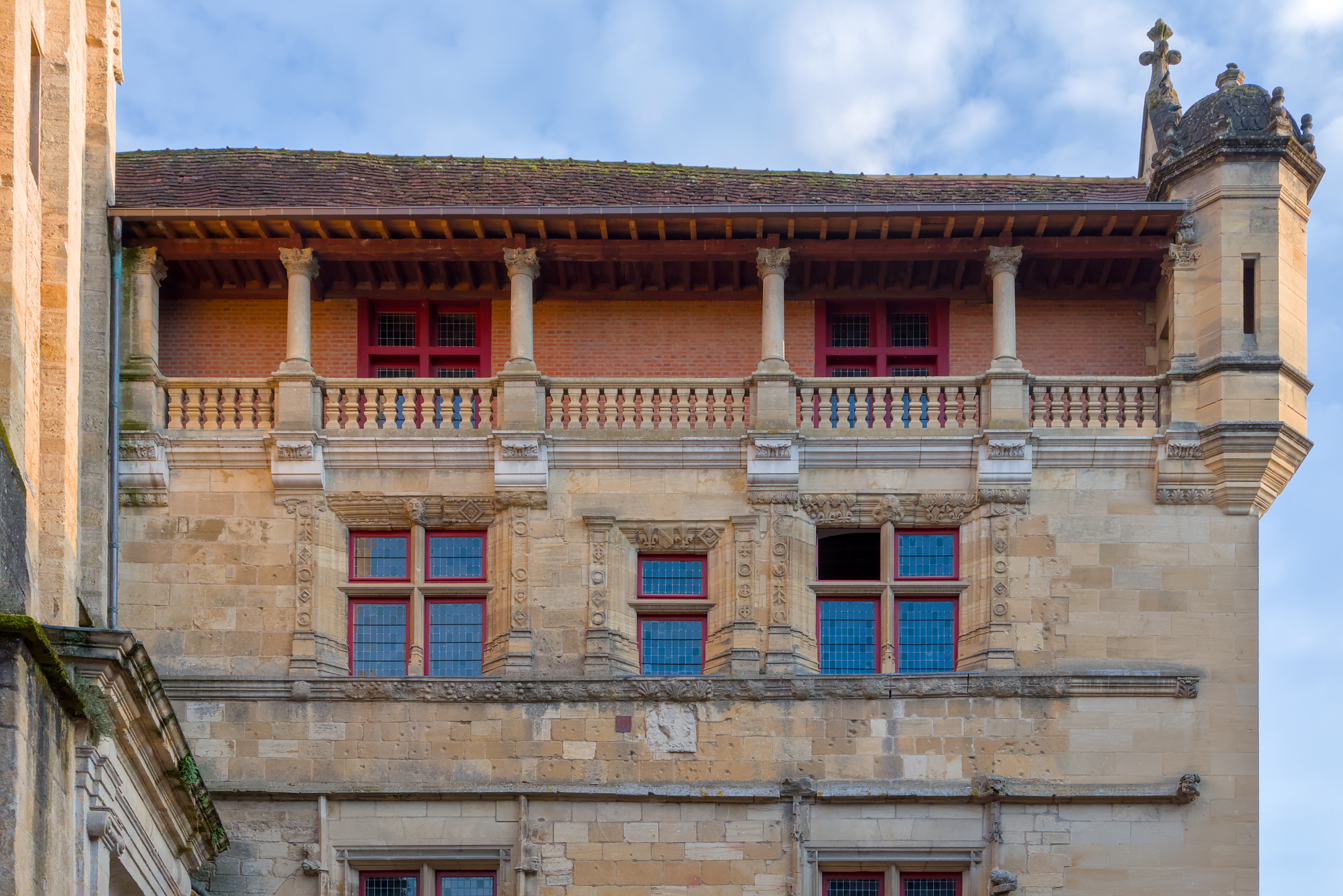
Upper part of the northern façade of the former bishop's residence

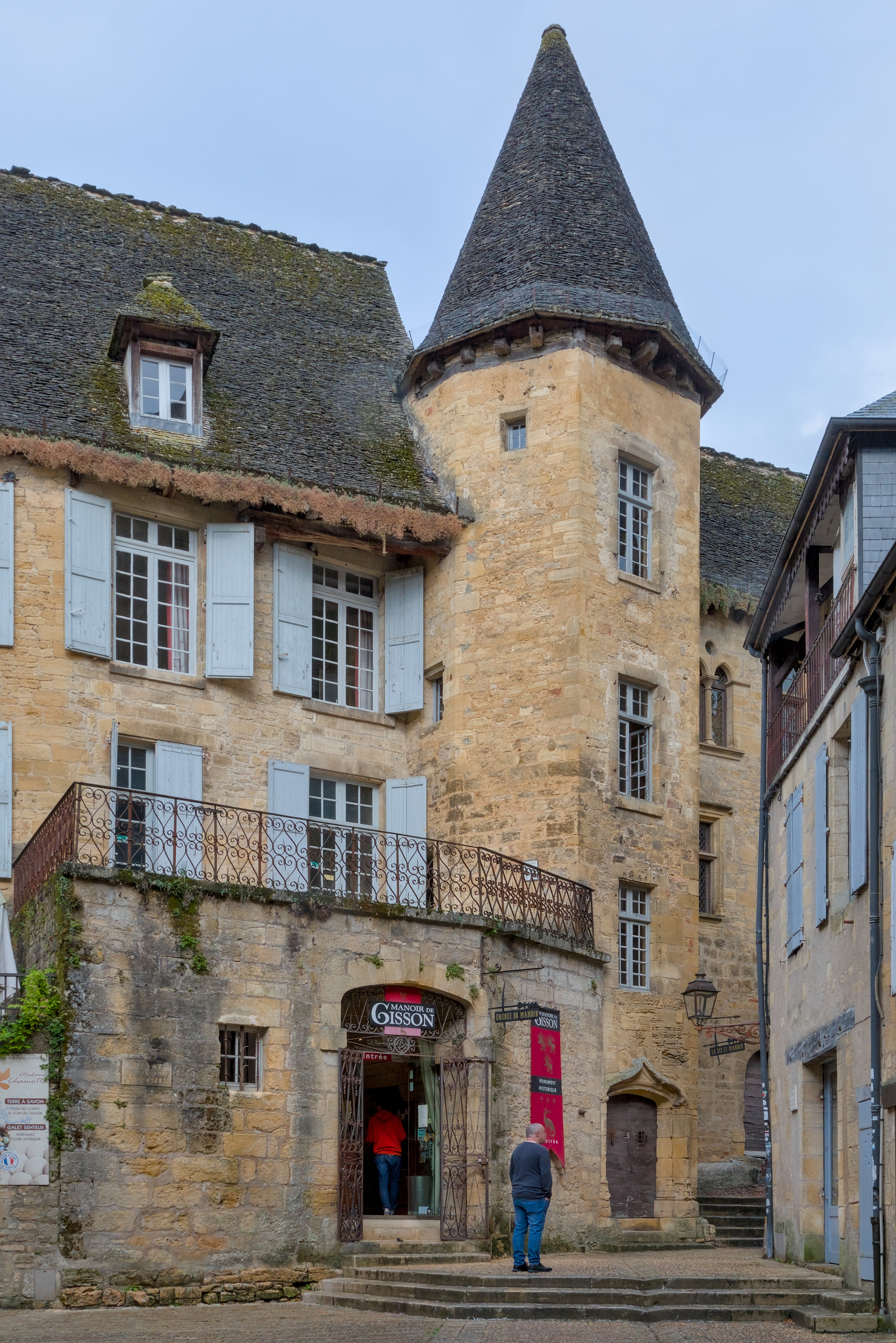
Gisson mansion, 15th century

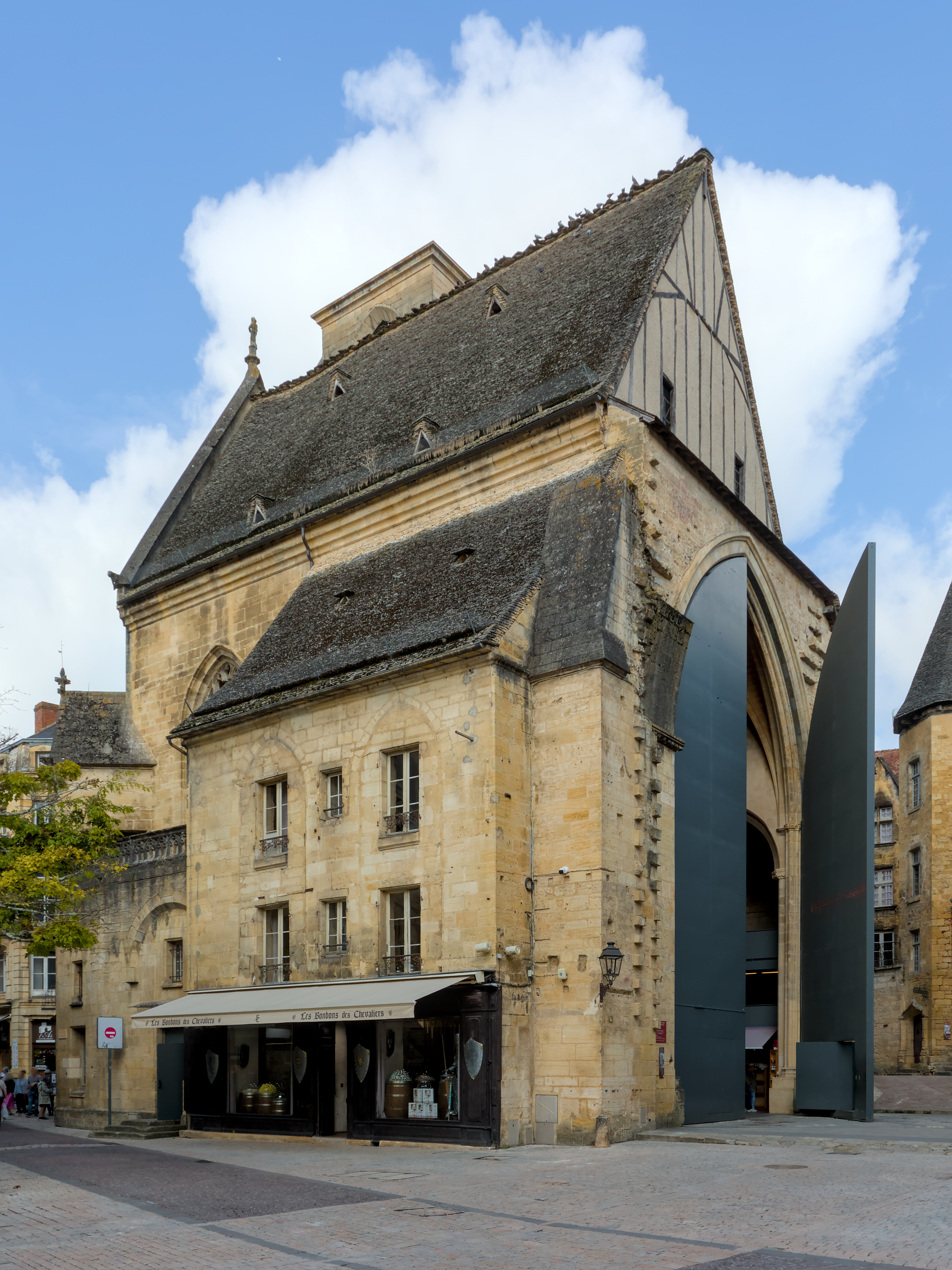
St Mary's church

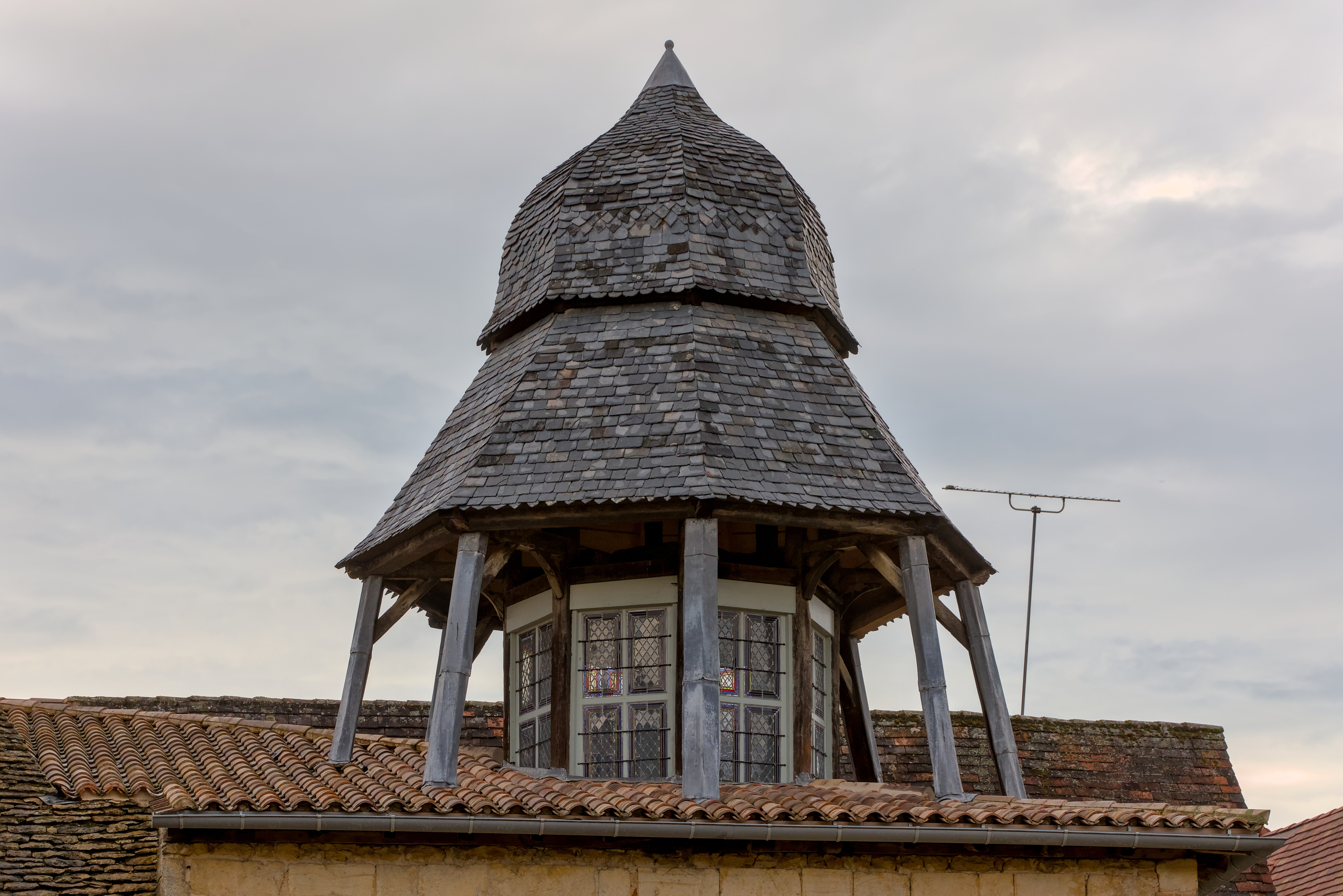
Lantern of the Présidial house

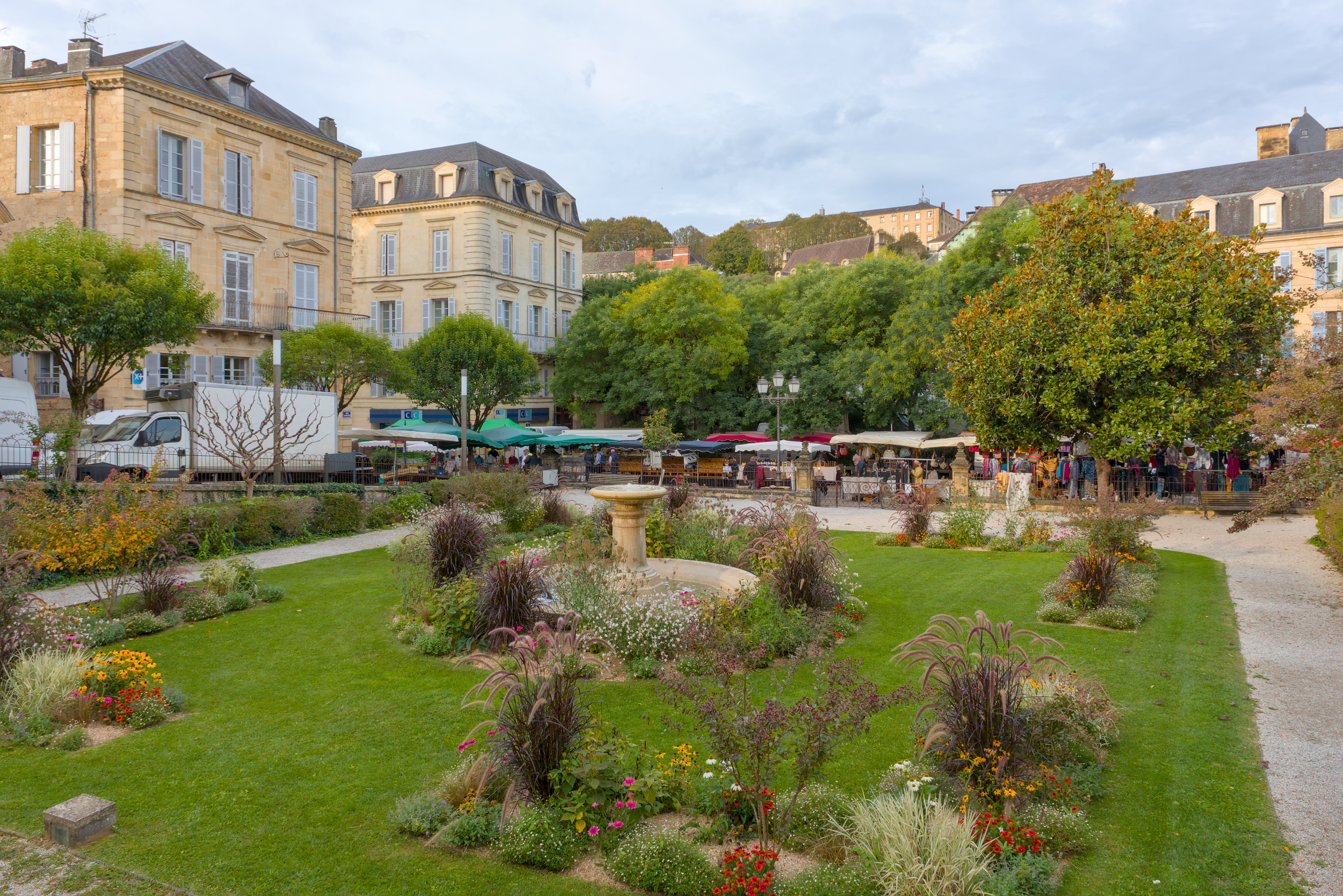
Place de la Petite Rigaudie, at the north of the center

== See also ==
- Communes of Dordogne
