= Sarlat Cathedral =

Roman Catholic church in Sarlat-la-Canéda, France

Coordinates: 44°53′20″N 1°13′1″E

Sarlat Cathedral Cathédrale Saint-Sacerdos de Sarlat
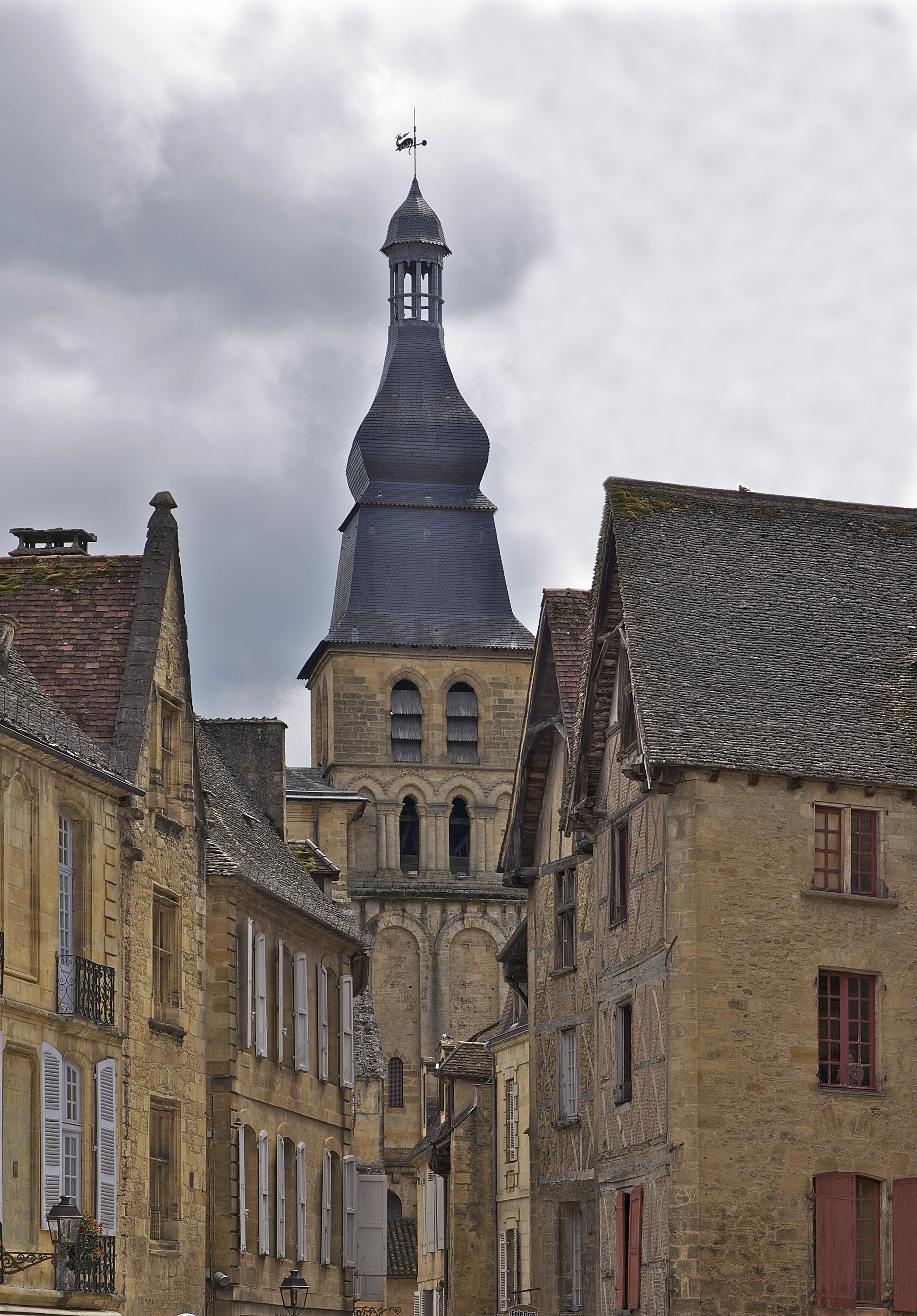
- View of the bell tower

Religion
- Affiliation: Roman Catholic
- Province: Diocese of Sarlat
- Region: Dordogne
- Ecclesiastical or organisational status: Cathedral
- Status: Active

Location
- Location: Sarlat-la-Canéda, France
- Interactive map of Sarlat Cathedral; Cathédrale Saint-Sacerdos de Sarlat

Architecture
- Type: church
- Groundbreaking: 14th century
- Completed: 17th century

Sarlat Cathedral (Cathédrale Saint-Sacerdos de Sarlat) is a Roman Catholic church and former cathedral located in Sarlat-la-Canéda, France. It is a national monument.

The Diocese of Sarlat was established in 1317 with a number of bishoprics in the region in the aftermath of the suppression of the Albigensians. The new bishop of Sarlat was the abbot of the ancient Sarlat Abbey, the church of which became the cathedral. Rebuilding began in 1504, but was not completed until the 1680s. (The belfry dates from the 9th century). The diocese was abolished under the Concordat of 1801 and its territory was transferred to the Diocese of Périgueux.

The dedication refers to Saint Sacerdos rather than to the Latin term sacerdos ("priest"). There are two French saints called Sacerdos, but the cathedral refers to Sacerdos of Limoges, whose relics it received during the Middle Ages.

== Gallery ==
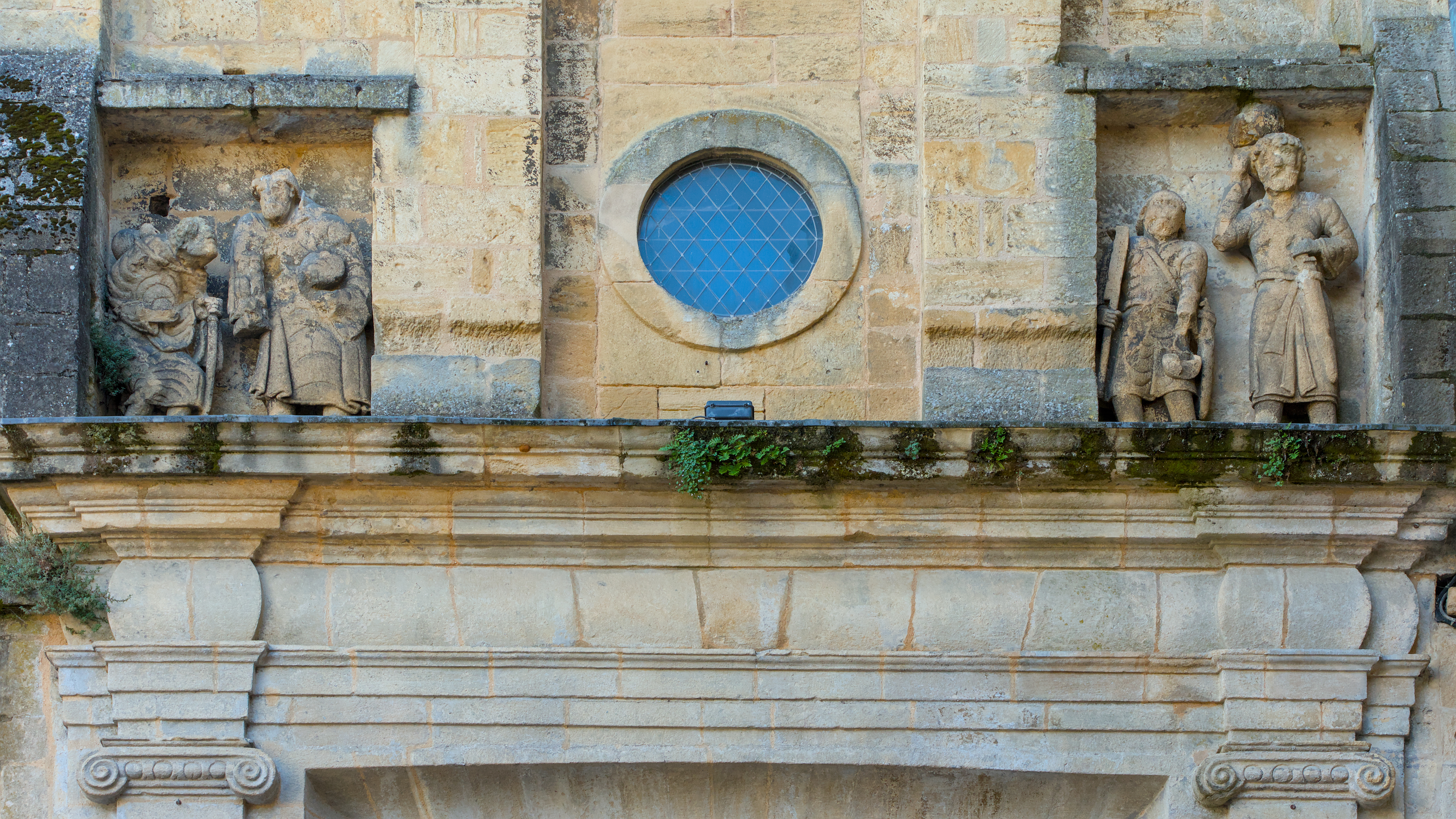
Details of the façade.

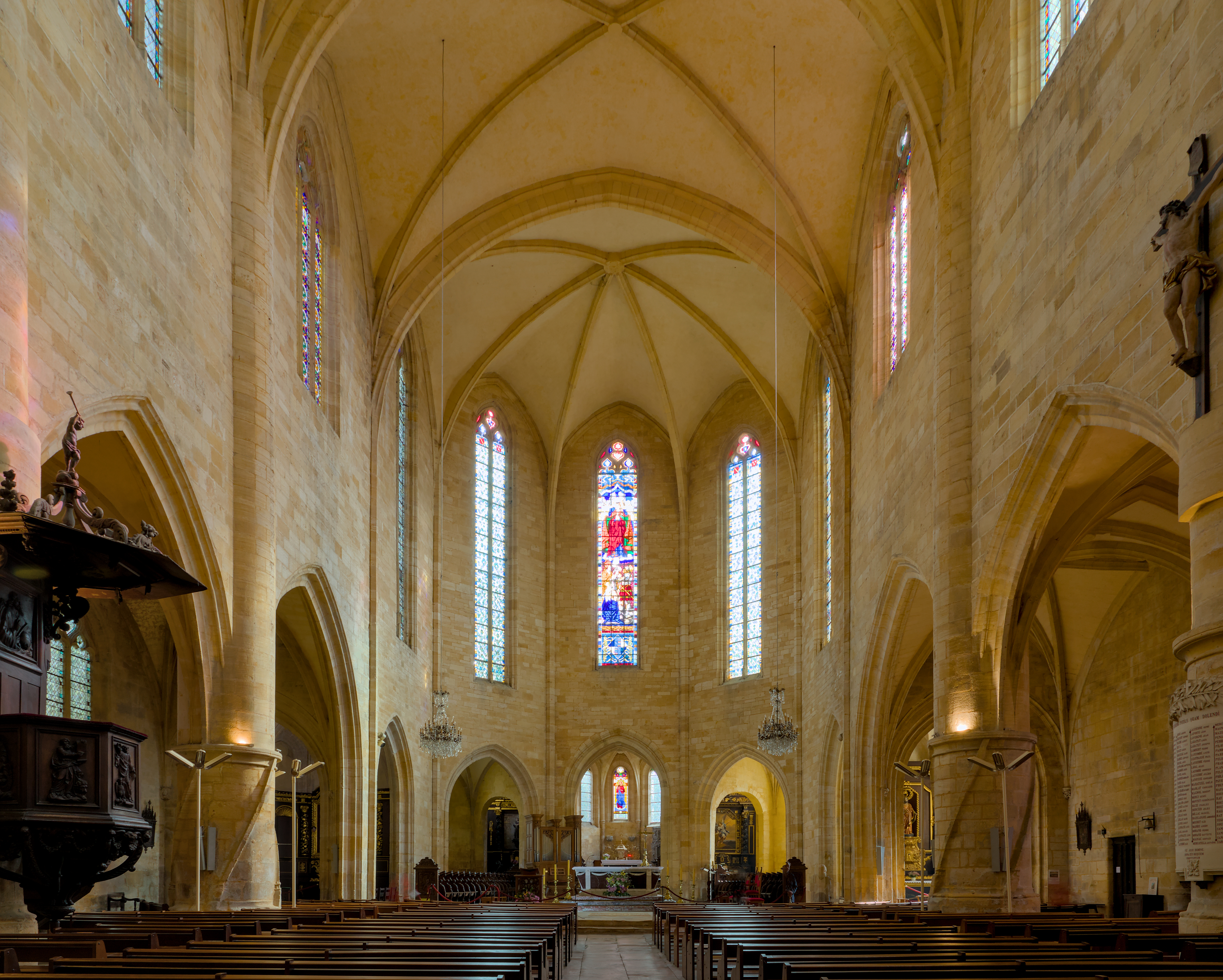
General view of the interior.

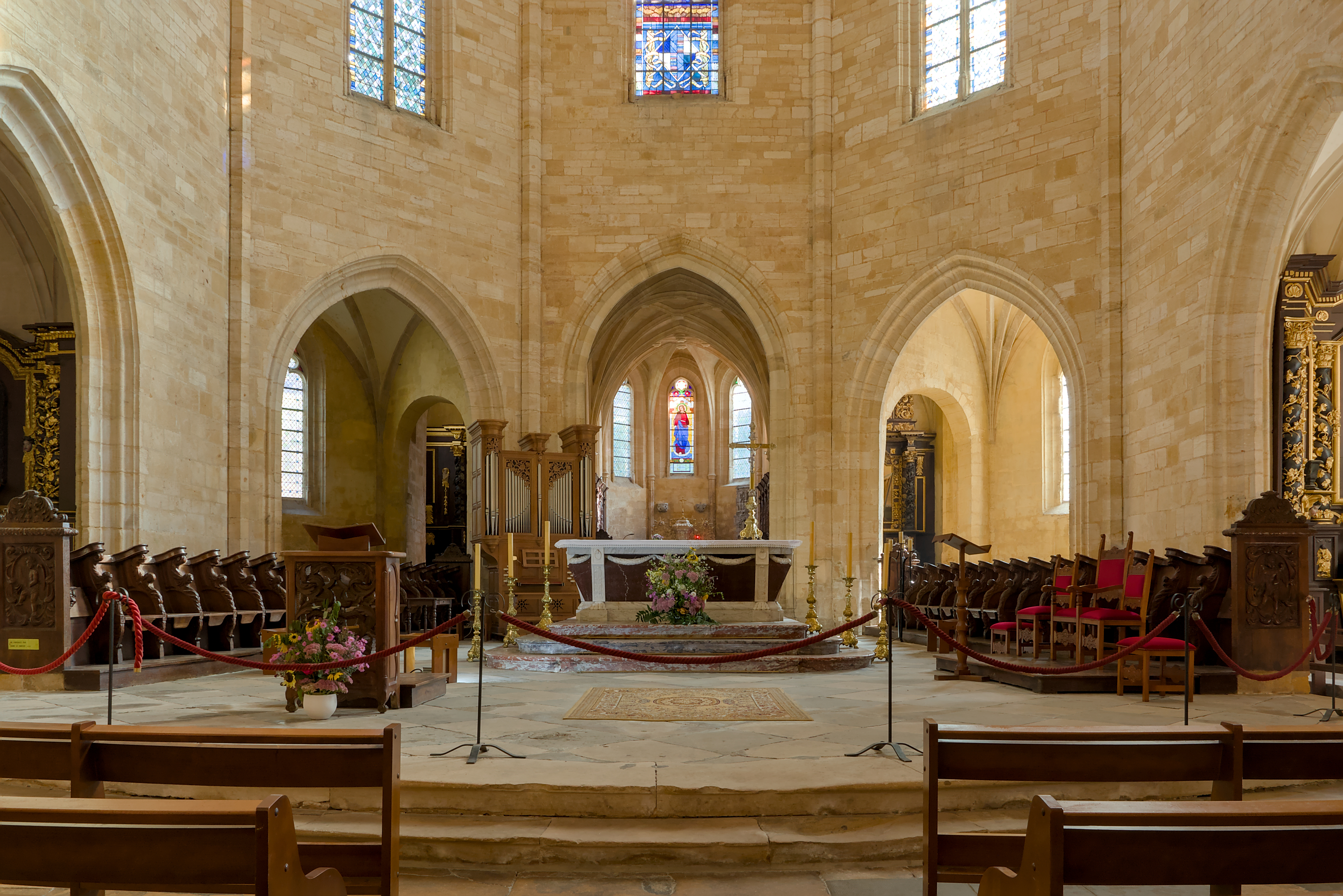
The choir.

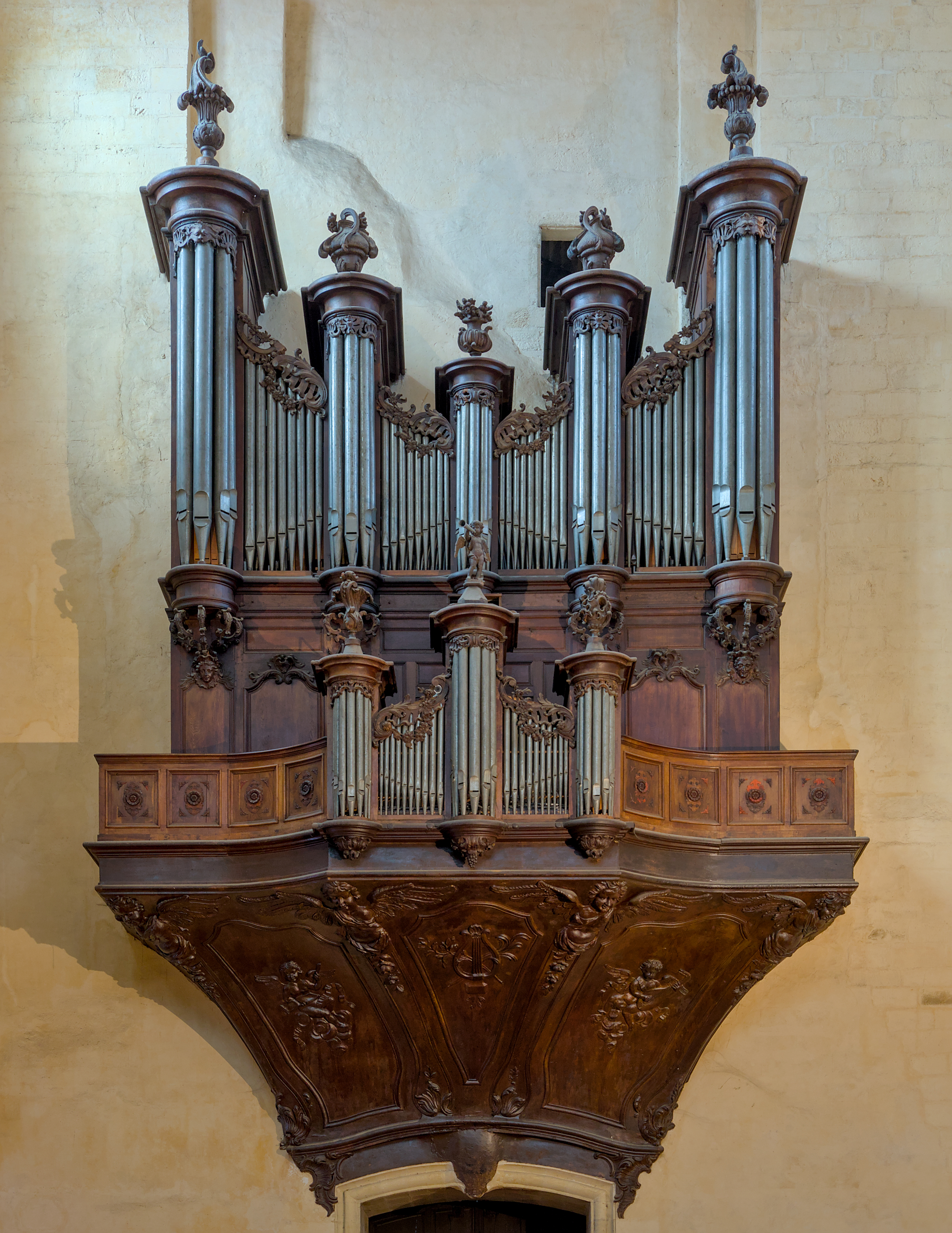
The pipe organ.

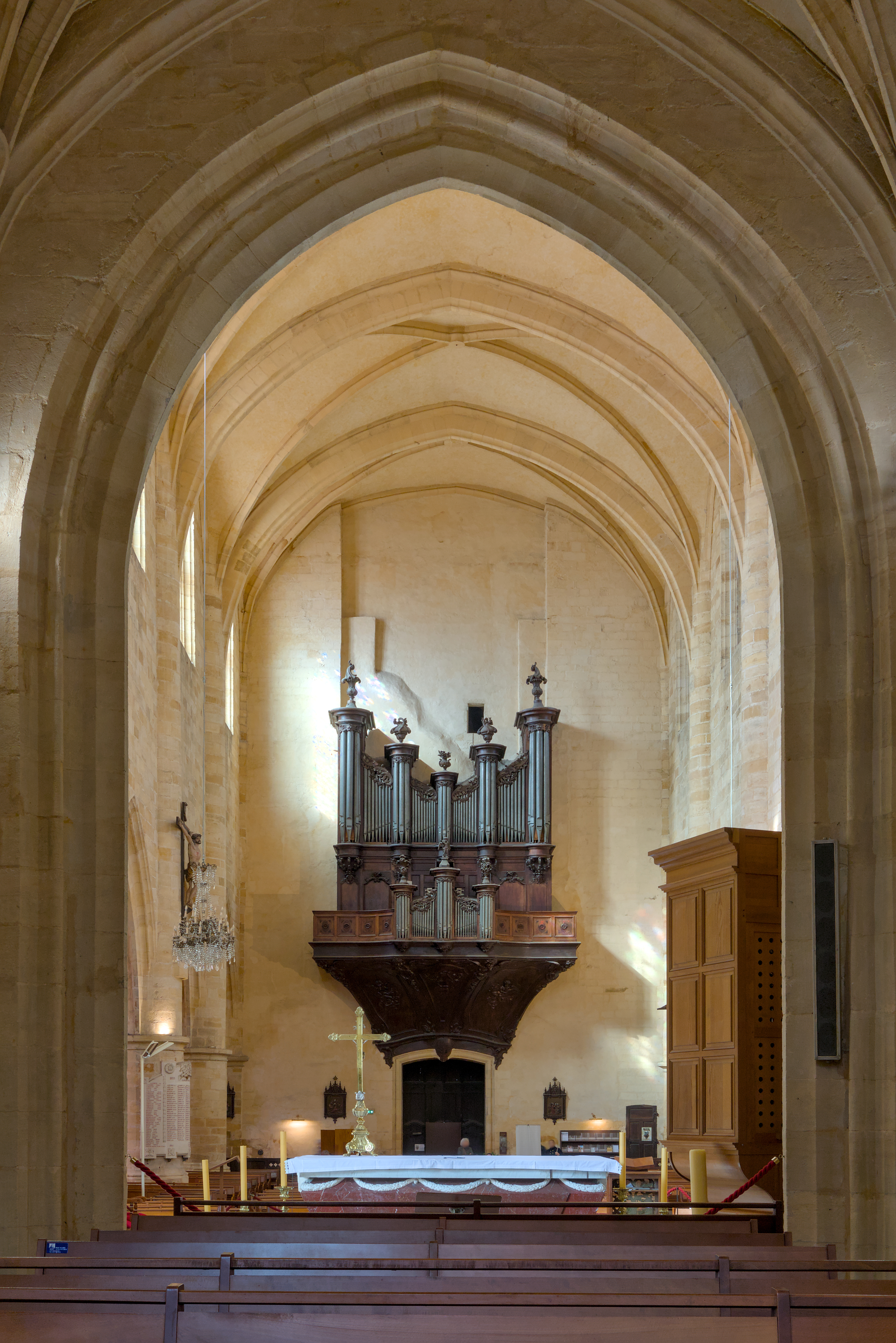
View from behind the choir.
