= Ars praedicandi =

Medieval literary genre concerning the composition and delivery of sermons

Decorative initial Q at the start of the anonymous ars with the incipit Quoniam fructus prophetie est secure

Ars praedicandi (Latin for "the art of preaching", plural artes praedicandi) was a literary genre of the later Middle Ages, comprising treatises and manuals to aid preachers in composing and delivering sermons in the then modern style. The singular term could also refer to the act or theory of preaching itself. The ars praedicandi was one of several genres of technical treatise in literary composition that flourished in the later Middle Ages, alongside the ars dictaminis for letter writing, ars grammatica for Latin grammar and ars poetriae for verse. The ars praedicandi may thus be considered one of the medieval branches of rhetoric. It also belongs to the broader category of late medieval pastoralia.

Artes praedicandi can be contrasted with other sermon aids, such as treatises on virtues and vices aimed at preachers, sermon collections, collections of sententiae or exempla, and model sermons. The genre is also limited to Western Christianity. In Eastern Christianity, where such formal treatises on preaching did not develop, their role was largely filled by sermon collections.

== Origins ==
The appearance of the ars praedicandi begins what has been called the "third phase" in the history of Christian preaching in the West, following the preaching of Christ and the apostles as reported in the New Testament (first phase) and a long period with only limited and general theoretical contributions (second phase). The major influences on the artes from the second phase are Augustine of Hippo's De doctrina christiana (426), Gregory the Great's Cura pastoralis (591) and Hrabanus Maurus' De institutione clericorum (819).

Augustine advised Christian orators to make use of established rhetorical techniques. The authors of artes praedicandi were influenced by classical writings on rhetoric and oratory, especially the works of Cicero, Quintilian and the anonymous Rhetorica ad Herennium. In this, however, the ars praedicandi, was a relatively late arrival, coming about a century later, for example, than the ars poetriae.

The earliest of the ars praedicandi type is generally considered to be Alan of Lille's Summa de arte praedicatoria of 1200. His work has its 12th-century predecessors in the sermon collections of Honorius of Autun, Maurice of Sully and Peter the Chanter. One of the earliest works on preaching that led directly to the later artes is the Quo ordine sermo fieri debeat of Guibert of Nogent (1084).

Although Alan of Lille's treatise may be the first ars praedicandi, its title is a later invention. He did not use the phrase. The first person to use the technical term ars in reference to preaching appears to be William of Auvergne in his Summa de arte praedicandi of the second quarter of the 13th century, although Thomas of Chobham may have used it slightly earlier.

== Scholastic sermons ==
The artes praedicandi were written for a specific type of sermon that was in vogue between the early 13th and late 15th centuries. This is usually known as the scholastic sermon or university sermon, but has also been called the thematic sermon or modern sermon. It is distinct from the typical homily, in which a longer biblical text (lection) is read and explained according to the four senses of Scripture, a form that dated back to antiquity and continued to be popular into modern times.

The scholastic sermon, on the contrary, began with a prologue, stating its theme, followed by a short biblical text. The theme was then divided and subdivided before being developed to conclusions, supported by reference to authorities, such as Scripture, the Church Fathers or exempla. This threefold structure—thema, division, and development—is the backbone of the scholastic sermon. The rise of this sermon type "accompanied, and perhaps caused" the appearance of ars praedicandi.

== Content and types ==
Although central to the artes praedicandi was sermon composition and structure, they could cover all aspects of preaching, including the preacher's moral rectitude and study habits and the physical act of preaching. Siegfried Wenzel identified three main types of ars praedicandi depending on how much material they cover: "comprehensive" artes cover all the aforementioned areas; "complete" artes cover composition and structure only; and "limited" artes cover only a single aspect of sermon structure.

== Influence ==
How the artes praedicandi were actually used in practice is an open question in scholarship. Few of them are well preserved in manuscript, although it may be that as well used and well worn manuscripts they had a poor survival rate. Only one manuscript copy of any text shows signs of use—marginal notes and glosses—Alan of Lille's Summa de arte praedicatoria in Cambridge University Library MS Ii.1.24. Siegfried Wenzel has, however, detected adherence to the prescriptions of the artes even in vernacular sermon texts of the 14th and 15th centuries. Moreover, many artes make reference to actual practices. Robert of Basevorn distinguishes practices typical at the University of Paris from those of Oxford University.

The influence of the artes praedicandi has also been detected in the structure of the Gawain poet's poems Cleanness and Pearl.

== Authors and texts ==
The latest artes praedicandi were written in the 16th century. The tradition came to an end with the Reformation. Over 300 texts have been identitified. Only about 30 of these have modern editions.

Many works are pseudepigraphal, either deliberately so (whether by their authors or by scribes or printer) in order to increase readership or else misattributed through confusion or error. Artes praedicandi in both manuscripts and printed editions are attributed to three famous theologians—Albert the Great, Bonaventure and Thomas Aquinas—but none of the attributions are genuine. In the case of that misattributed to Albert, its actual author, William of Auvergne, is known.

Many works with known authors also circulated anonymously in the manuscripts. Authors sometimes borrowed material from each other, creating composite works that defy easy attribution. Difficulties like these have sometimes been compounded by editors misidentifying similar texts.

The popularity of the genre was not even across space and time. In the 13th century, most known authors were active in France and England. In the 14th century, there is an increase in authors from Italy, the Iberian Peninsula and the Low Countries. Authors from Germany and further east appear later.

=== Manuscripts ===
Artes were rarely bound alone but are usually found alongside other works in composite manuscripts. These come in two types: higher quality folio-sized sermon collections in which the artes serve as introductions or epilogues and more practical quarto-sized collections of preacher's aids. The longest text is just over 100 leaves in quarto format, but most are much shorter.

=== List of known authors ===
Among the authors of artes praedicandi are:

- Afonso de Alprão
- Alan of Lille
- Alexander of Ashby
- Alexander of Somerset
- Arnold de Puig
- Antoninus of Florence
- Austentius
- Baldo degli Ubaldi
- Christian Borgsleben
- Francesco da Fabriano
- Francesc Eiximenis
- Friedrich von Nürnberg
- Gauthier de Château-Thierry
- Geoffrey Schale
- Géraud du Pescher
- Gozewijn Haeks
- Guibert of Tournai
- Heinrich Aeger von Kalkar
- Henry of Hesse
- Hermannus Teutonicus
- Hugo de Sneyth
- Hugo Sunfeld
- Humbert of Preuilly
- Humbert of Romans
- Jacob of Juterbogk
- Jacobus de Saraponte
- Jacobus de Varagine
- Jacques de Lausanne
- Jacques le Grand (?)
- James of Fusignano
- Jean de Châlons
- Jean de la Rochelle
- Jodok Weiler von Heilbrunn
- Johann Ulrich Surgant
- Johannes Keck
- John Felton
- John Folsham
- John of Gwidernia
- John of Wales
- Landolfo Caracciolo
- Lorenzo Guglielmo Traversagni
- Ludovico da Rocha
- Martín Alonso de Córdoba
- Martin von Amberg
- Mauricius Leydis
- Michael of Hungary
- Nicholas Eyfeler
- Nicholas Trivet
- Nicolas Denisse (?)
- Nicolaus Heritius
- Nicole Oresme
- Nikolaus Schreiter von Koburck
- Olivier Maillard de Went
- Pietro Bompietro
- Paulus Kölner
- Ramon Llull
- Ranulph Higden
- Richard of Thetford
- Robert of Basevorn
- Robert Holcot (?)
- Silvestro da Marradi (?)
- Simon Alcock
- Stephan Hoest
- Thomas of Chobham
- Thomas of Cleves
- Thomas of Pavia (?)
- Thomas Penketh
- Thomas of Salisbury
- Thomas de Tuderto
- Thomas Waleys
- Walter of Bruges (?)
- William of Auvergne

=== List of anonymous texts ===
Among anonymous texts that have been edited and published, many known by their incipits, are:

- Ad habendum materiam
- Ars concionandi, a Pseudo-Bonaventuran work
- Dic nobis quid tibi videtur
- Hic docet
- Omnis rei inicio
- Predicacio est thematis assumpcio
- Quamvis de sermonibus
- Si vis sermonem
- Tractatulus solemnis de arte et vero modo predicandi, a Pseudo-Aquinan work
- Vade in domum tuam

== Bibliography ==
- Blanch, Robert J.; Miller, Miriam Y.; Wasserman, Julian N., eds. (1991). "Introduction". Text and Matter: New Critical Perspectives of the Pearl-Poet. Whitston. pp. xiii–xix.
- Briscoe, Marianne G. (1982). "Ars Praedicandi". In Joseph R. Strayer (ed.). Dictionary of the Middle Ages. Vol. 1. Charles Scribner's Sons. p. 555–558.
- Briscoe, Marianne G. (1995). "First Part: Artes Praedicandi". In Marianne G. Briscoe; Barbara H. Jaye (eds.). Artes Praedicandi and Artes Orandi. Brepols.
- Caplan, Harry (1933). "Classical Rhetoric and the Mediaeval Theory of Preaching". Classical Philology. 28 (2): 73–96. JSTOR 264267.
- Caplan, Harry (1934). Mediaeval Artes Praedicandi: A Hand-List. Cornell University Press.
- Caplan, Harry (1936). Mediaeval Artes Praedicandi: A Supplementary Hand-List. Cornell University Press.
- Caplan, Harry (2003). "Ars praedicandi". New Catholic Encyclopedia. Vol. 1: A–Azt (2nd ed.). Gale. pp. 734–735.
- Chance, Jane (1991). "Allegory and Structure in Pearl: The Four Senses of the Ars Praedicandi and Fourteenth-Century Homiletic Poetry". In Robert J. Blanch; Miriam Y. Miller; Julian N. Wasserman (eds.). Text and Matter: New Critical Perspectives of the Pearl-Poet. Whitston. pp. 31–59.
- Charland, Thomas-Marie (1936). Artes praedicandi: contribution à l'histoire de la rhétorique au Moyen Âge. Ottawa: Institut d'Études Médiévales.
- D'Avray, David L. (1977). The Transformation of the Medieval Sermon (PhD dissertation). University of Oxford.
- Gallick, Susan (1977). "Artes praedicandi: Early Printed Editions". Mediaeval Studies. 39 (1): 477–489. doi:10.1484/j.ms.2.306843.
- Kienzle, Beverly Mayne (2010). "Ars praedicandi". In Robert E. Bjork (ed.). The Oxford Dictionary of the Middle Ages. Oxford University Press.
- Morenzoni, Franco (2000). "Artes praedicandi". In André Vauchez (ed.). Encyclopedia of the Middle Ages. Translated by Adrian Walford. Fitzroy Dearborn. p. 114.
- Murphy, James J. (1974). Rhetoric in the Middle Ages: A History of Rhetorical Theory from Saint Augustine to the Renaissance. University of California Press.
- Reeves, Andrew (2013). "'The Cure of Souls is the Art of Arts': Preaching, Confession, and Catechesis in the Middle Ages". Religion Compass. 7 (9): 372–384. doi:10.1111/rec3.12058.
- Roest, Bert (2012). "Ne Effluat in Multiloquium Et Habeatur Honerosus: The Art of Preaching in the Franciscan Tradition". In Timothy Johnson (ed.). Franciscans and Preaching: Every Miracle from the Beginning of the World Came about through Words. Brill. pp. 381–412.
- Şenocak, Neslihan (2022). "Pastor as Teacher: A New Care of Souls". In Clare Monagle; Neslihan Şenocak (eds.). Lateran IV: Theology and Care of Souls. Brepols. pp. 89–112. doi:10.1484/M.DISPUT.5.128355.
- Schumacher, Lydia (2022). "Ars praedicandi". In Andrew Louth (ed.). The Oxford Dictionary of the Christian Church (4th ed.). Oxford University Press.
- Tamminen, Miikka (2018). Crusade Preaching and the Ideal Crusader. Brepols.
- Wenzel, Siegfried (2005). "The Arts of Preaching". In Alastair Minnis; Ian Johnson (eds.). The Cambridge History of Literary Criticism. Vol. 2, The Middle Ages. Cambridge University Press. pp. 84–96.
- Wenzel, Siegfried (2013). The Art of Preaching: Five Medieval Texts & Translations. Catholic University of America Press.
- Wenzel, Siegfried (2015). Medieval 'Artes Praedicandi': A Synthesis of Scholastic Sermon Structure. University of Toronto Press.
