= Grazier =

Grazier may refer to:

- A person engaged in pastoral farming

== People ==
- Margaret Hayes Grazier (1916–1999), an American librarian and educator
- Colin Grazier (1920–1942), a Royal Navy sailor
- John Grazier (born 1945), an American painter
- Kevin Grazier, an American planetary physicist

== Publications ==
- The Riverine Grazier (1873–), an Australian agricultural newspaper
- The Western Grazier (1880–1951), an Australian agricultural newspaper

== See also ==
- Grazer (disambiguation)
- Glazier, a glass installation worker
- Pastoral (disambiguation)
- Pastoralists and Graziers Association of Western Australia
