= Graze =

Grazing may refer to:

- Grazing, the agricultural practice of feeding grass
- Grazing (behaviour), the animal behaviour

Graze may also refer to:

- a graze, a type of abrasion
- Graze (company), a United Kingdom snacks producer
- Graze, a surname; people with the name include:
  - Gerald Graze, American Department of State official
  - Stanley Graze, American economist

== See also ==
- Grazer (disambiguation)
- Grays (disambiguation)
