= Waleys =

Waleys is a surname. Notable people with the surname include:

- Robert Waleys (fl. 1373–1388), an English Member of Parliament
- Thomas Waleys, 14th century English Dominican theologian
- William Waleys, an English Member of Parliament in the 1380s and 1390

== See also ==
- Henry le Walleis (died 1302), also spelled le Waleys, English businessman and politician, five-term mayor of London and mayor of Bordeaux
