= Martín de Córdoba =

Martín de Córdoba may refer to:

- Martín López de Córdoba (died 1371), Castilian soldier
- Martín Fernández de Córdoba (died 1437), alcaide of the Donceles
- Martín Alonso de Córdoba (died 1476), Augustinian writer
- Martín Fernández de Córdoba (died 1478), alcaide of the Donceles
- Martín de Córdoba (organ builder) (fl. 1532–1541), built an organ for the Cathedral-Basilica of Our Lady of the Pillar
- Martín Alonso Fernández de Córdoba Montemayor y Velasco (died 1558), viceroy of Navarre, governor of Oran
- Martín de Córdoba Mendoza (died 1581), Spanish bishop
- Martín de Córdoba y Velasco, marqués de Cortes (died 1604), governor of Oran
- Martín de Córdoba (died 1620), commissary general of the Crusade
