= Johannes Keck =

Tractatulus de cautela predicandi by Keck

Johannes Keck (c. 1400 – 29 June 1450) was a German theologian, professor and monk. He wrote on various topics, including music theory and the Council of Basel, which he attended.

== Life ==
Keck was born around 1400 in Giengen an der Brenz. His father Nikolaus was a burgher and wainwright of Giengen. Johannes was at the University of Vienna from 1422 until 1431, first as a student of theology, philosophy and the liberal arts and, after obtaining his Master of Arts degree in 1429, as a regent master lecturing on mathematics, philosophy and theology.

In 1434, Keck held a benefice in Saint Peter's Church in Munich. He was still in Munich in 1437, when he served as confessor to Duke Albert III of Bavaria and Duchess Anna of Brunswick-Grubenhagen.

In 1441, Keck was invited to the Council of Basel by his patron, Johannes Grünwalder. In 1441, received his doctoral degree from the conciliar university of Basel. He was probably the first Doctor of Theology graduated by the new university set up by the council. He afterwards taught there for one year.

In 1442, he joined the Benedictine Order and entered Tegernsee Abbey. There he described himself as a "professor of the arts and sacred theology" (artium ac sacrae theologiae professor). He introduced humanist ideas to Tegernsee. He died in Rome on 29 June 1450 during a penitential pilgrimage.

== Works ==
Keck wrote sermons, letters, reports from the Council of Basel and various theoretical treatises. He had an interest in contemplative theology. His best known work, Introductorium musicae, is a treatise on music theory written at Tegernsee in 1442. He also wrote a treatise on preaching in the ars praedicandi tradition, Tractatulus de cautela predicandi, which is in the form of a letter.

His sermons, mostly from his Basel period, are found across more than twelve manuscripts. A sermon collection, Sacrorum sermonum sylvula, was printed in 1574 with a short biography of Keck by Erasmus Vendius.

He wrote a commentary on the Rule of Saint Benedict. Some 47 manuscripts contain his many unpublished works.

== Works cited ==
- Anderson, Gordon A. (2001). "Keck, Johannes [Keckius]". Grove Music Online (8th ed.). Oxford University Press. ISBN 978-1-56159-263-0. (subscription, Wikilibrary access, or UK public library membership required)
- Caplan, Harry (1936). Mediaeval Artes Praedicandi: A Supplementary Hand-List. Cornell University Press.
- Carpenter, Nan Cooke (1972) [1958]. Music in the Medieval and Renaissance Universities. Da Capo Press.
- Renner, Frumentius (1977). "Keck, Johannes". Neue Deutsche Biographie (in German). Vol. 11. Berlin: Duncker & Humblot. pp. 387–388. (full text online).
- Slemon, Peter, ed. (2001). Introductorium musicae of Johannes Keck. Institute of Mediæval Music.
- Slemon, Peter (2010). "Keck, Johannes". In Robert E. Bjork (ed.). The Oxford Dictionary of the Middle Ages. Oxford University Press.
- Stieber, Joachim W. (2022). Pope Eugenius IV, the Council of Basel and the Secular and Ecclesiastical Authorities in the Empire. Brill.
