= Piagnoni =

Christian movement of the followers of Girolamo Savonarola

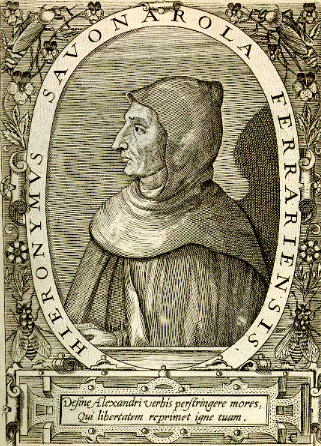
Girolamo Savonarola

The Piagnoni were a group of Christians who followed the teachings of Girolamo Savonarola and a related political faction in the Republic of Florence. The later Piagnoni remained in the Catholic Church and kept a mixture with the teachings of Catholic dogma and the teachings of Savonarola. The name Piagnoni (meaning "Weepers") was given because they wept for their sins and the sins of the world.

The opponents of the Piagnoni were the Arrabbiati at first, but after 1500 these factions formed an alliance against the Medici.

== Beliefs ==
The Piagnoni believed the message of Savonarola that clergy need to stick to their sacramental functions and leave charitable work for the laity. Savonarola also preached against what he saw as "lax and corrupt clergy", and called for a theocratic republic and religious reform. The Piagnoni opposed secular items deemed sinful by Savonarola such as cosmetics, secular art, and many musical instruments, which they burned in 1497.

== History ==
While Savonarola was still alive, the Piagnoni supported his campaigns against illicit sex, gambling and blasphemy. Savonarola also organized groups of followers that persuaded the people to hand over secular items to be burned in a bonfire of the vanities. The Piagnoni survived underground, even after Medici rule was reinstalled in Florence, although they gradually abandoned their goals. The Piagnoni are also linked to the presence of reformation ideas in Florence as some later Piagnoni already in 1520 praised the views of Martin Luther. Many other late followers of Savonarola were first attracted to Luther's attacks on the pope and clergy, but later had disagreements with his other theology.

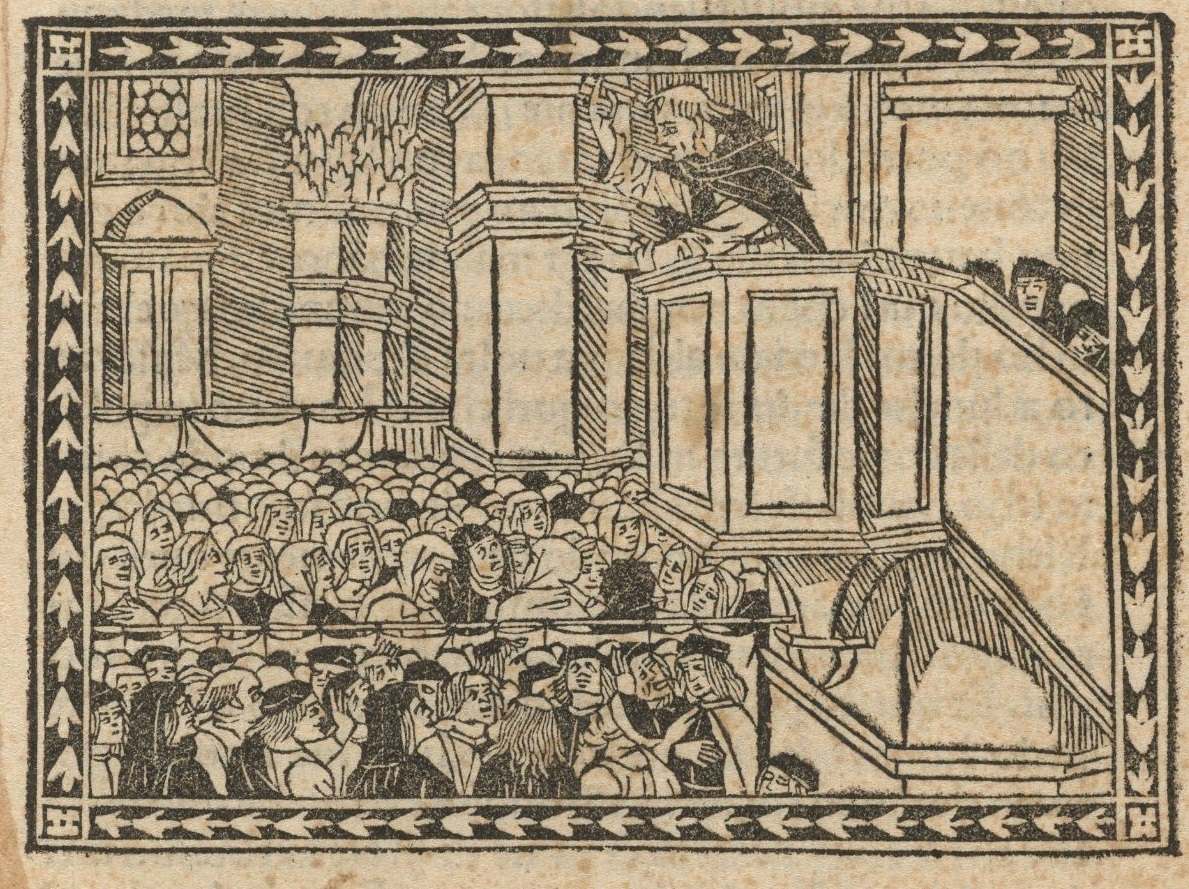
Savonarola preaching

Some Piagnoni converted to Protestantism, while others wrote against the views of Luther. Petrus Bernandinus was a follower of Savonarola and had a fanatical zeal to his teachings. Petrus preached in Florence while Savonarola was alive and continued to do so after he was killed. Later Petrus and his companions were burned for heresy while others were expelled from Florence. Philip Neri was a devoted follower of the teachings of Savonarola; later he would be an influential figure in the Counter-Reformation.

== Famous piagnoni ==
The following list is derived from Lorenzo Polizzotto (1994), The Elect Nation: The Savonarolan Movement in Florence 1494–1545, Clarendon Press.

- Alamanno Salviati
- Antonio Canigiani
- Bartolomeo da Faenza
- Bartolomeo Redditi
- Benedetto da Foiano
- Benedetto Luschino
- Bernardo Nasi
- Domenico Benivieni
- Domenico Buonvicini
- Domenico Bonsi
- Francesco Valori
- Giovambattista Ridolfi
- Girolamo Benivieni
- Jacopo Salviati
- Jacopo da Sicilia
- Lanfredino Lanfredini
- Lorenzo Lenzi di Anfrione
- Lorenzo Violi
- Luca Bettini
- Niccolò Valori
- Paolo Antonio Soderini
- Pietro Bernardino
- Piero Guicciardini
- Santes Pagnino
- Silvestro Maruffi
- Silvestro da Marradi
- Tommaso Caiani
- Tommaso Soderini
- Zaccaria da Lunigiana
