= American Pastoral (disambiguation) =

American Pastoral is a 1997 novel by Philip Roth.

American Pastoral may also refer to:

- American Pastoral (film), a 2016 movie directed by Ewan McGregor
- HWY: An American Pastoral, a 1969 featurette film by Jim Morrison

== See also ==
- Pastoral (disambiguation)
