= Pastoral Symphony (disambiguation) =

The Pastoral Symphony is Beethoven's Symphony No. 6.

Pastoral Symphony may also refer to:

== Classical music ==
- Pastoral Symphony (Vaughan Williams), Symphony No. 3 by Ralph Vaughan Williams
- A Pastoral Symphony, Symphony No. 2 by Alan Rawsthorne
- Pastoral Symphony, or Pifa, a movement of Händel's Messiah
- Symphony No. 7 (Glazunov), by Alexander Glazunov, occasionally called Pastoral

== Other uses ==
- Pastoral Symphony (Australian band)
- La Symphonie pastorale, a novella by André Gide, 1919
  - Pastoral Symphony (film), a 1946 film adaptation
  - Symphonie Pastorale (film), a 1958 Australian TV broadcast

== See also ==
- Pastoral (disambiguation)
- Pastorale (disambiguation)
