= Richard of Thetford =

Start of the Ars dilatandi sermones in the manuscript Merton 249

Richard of Thetford was a 13th-century English preacher and author. His religious affiliation is uncertain. He may have been a monk of Thetford Priory. In the margin of one manuscript, he is called a canon, which would associate him with the Holy Sepulchre Priory in Thetford. A chaplain named Richard is recorded at the priory in 1247–1248.

Thetford wrote a Latin manual on sermon composition of the ars praedicandi type, entitled Ars dilatandi sermones (Art of Amplifying Sermons). It was one of the most widely copied of such manuals, being extant in some form in at least 26 manuscripts. In some manuscripts the work is misattributed to Albert the Great. In others, it is combined with other material to form an extended ars misattributed to Bonaventure. Thetford was also influential, being used by other preacher–writers, including Martin von Amberg, Olivier de Went, Ranulph Higden and Robert of Basevorn.

Ars dilatandi sermones is primarily about the eight modes of expanding (dilating) a sermon. His sample text is 1 Corinthians 14:12. The eight modes are:

(I) explaining a noun or name with a sentence, by definition, description, or etymology (interpretatio); (II) division of a concept (what other artes more properly call distinctio) with confirmation; (III) giving an argument; (IV) with fitting (concordantes) proof texts; (V) with different grammatical forms of the same word (degrees of comparison; compound verbs); (VI) developing the properties of an object; (VII) using the four senses of Scripture; (VIII) indicating causes and effects.

His example etymologies cover Latin, Greek, English and French. He recommends the exemplum as "of great use to layfolk, because ... graphic examples delight them."

== Bibliography ==
- Charland, Thomas-Marie (1936). Artes praedicandi: contribution à l'histoire de la rhétorique au Moyen Âge. Ottawa: Institut d'Études Médiévales.
- Engelhardt, George J. (1978). "Richard of Thetford: A Treatise on the Eight Modes of Dilatation". Allegorica. 3: 77–160.
- Murphy, James J. (1974). Rhetoric in the Middle Ages: A History of Rhetorical Theory from Saint Augustine to the Renaissance. University of California Press.
- Wenzel, Siegfried (2015). Medieval 'Artes Praedicandi': A Synthesis of Scholastic Sermon Structure. University of Toronto Press.
