= Le Roman de Silence =

Early 13th century work by Heldris de Cornuälle

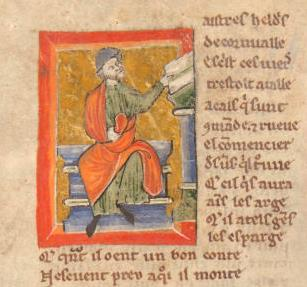
- Author(s): Heldris de Cornuälle
- Language: Old French, Picard dialect
- Date: 13th century
- Genre: Chivalric romance

Le Roman de Silence is an octosyllabic verse Old French roman in the Picard dialect, dated to the first half of the 13th century. It is the only work attributed to Heldris de Cornuälle (Heldris of Cornwall, an Arthurian pseudonym). Due to the text's late discovery and editing in 1927 and 1978, as well as its discussion of nature vs. nurture, transvestitism, sex and gender, and gender roles, the roman has attracted considerable interest both from medievalists and the field of Anglo-American gender studies.

== Manuscript ==
The single manuscript holding the text was found in 1911 in Wollaton Hall in Nottingham, in a crate marked "unimportant documents". The same crate also contained a letter written by Henry VIII. The manuscript is now part of the Wollaton Library Collection (WLC/LM/6), held by the Manuscripts and Special Collections, The University of Nottingham. Silence is one of a collection of 18 stories, including seven romances and ten fabliaux, illustrated with 83 miniatures. The discovery that the manuscript held a previously unknown Old French roman was made in 1927.

== Synopsis ==
The narrative concerns the adventures of Cador, the heir of the Earl of Cornwall, and then of his daughter Silence, who is raised as a boy in order to be eligible to inherit, as the king of England has outlawed the succession of females.

The narrator prefaces the story by condemning the greed and stinginess of the wealthy class. King Evan of England goes to war with King Begon of Norway; to resolve matters they arrange a marriage between Evan and Begon's daughter, Eufeme. Later, two Counts marry twin girls. Both Counts dispute over the twins' inheritance and settle things by fighting, but end up killing each other. Evan, upset that two men died fighting because of women, proclaims that women can no longer inherit as long as he rules. Evan then goes to Winchester, where he and his men encounter a dragon in the woods. The King announces that if any of them are able to slaughter the dragon, he will give them a county and his pick of any woman in the kingdom. Cador, a knight who is in love with a woman named Eufemie who serves the Queen, successfully faces the dragon. Back home, Cador is welcomed warmly because of his bravery. Eufemie, who also loves Cador, is eager to marry him, but Cador falls ill from the venom and fumes encountered while fighting the dragon. Evan promises Eufemie that he will grant her marriage to any available man in the kingdom if she can cure Cador. Eufemie cures Cador, each of them falling more in love with the other. When they finally admit their feelings for each other, they ask the King to make good on his promises. The King gives his consent, along with 1,000 pounds a year and the territory of Cornwall once Eufemie's father, Count Renald, passes away. Count Renald dies a year after Cador and Eufemie get married. Cador inherits the county of Cornwall, and he and Eufemie conceive a child. If it is a girl, Cador has the idea to lie to everybody and tell them that it is a boy, that way their child will be able to inherit no matter what.

While Eufemie is pregnant, Nature makes the child beautiful in every way possible, putting the "beauty of a thousand" into her. When she is born, the midwife announces to everybody that Eufemie and Cador have a beautiful son, even though it is a girl. The Count decides to name the child Silence after Saint Patience. The child as a boy will be called Silentius, and if his sex is discovered it will be changed to Silentia. The Count calls on a seneschal, who was raised along Eufemie, to keep the child's secret safe. The Seneschal builds a house in the woods where he, the child, and the midwife live in solitude. Silence grows into the best-behaved and smartest boy there ever was but Nature realizes that she has been tricked and wants revenge. When Silence is old enough to understand he is a girl, his father explains the circumstances. Silence agrees to conceal himself from everyone and builds up his endurance through physical activities. Nature appears to Silence at the age of twelve, chastising him for hiding his sex. Silence is almost convinced until Nurture arrives and debates with Nature. Reason appears then, and makes Silence see that he is better off as a man, but his heart remains divided.

Then, two skilled minstrels touring England receive shelter with Silence and the Seneschal; Silence decides to run away with them. The minstrels promise to protect and watch over Silence, but they do not know that Silence is the son of Cador. Cador and Eufemie are so heartbroken and angry when they hear the news that they banish Jongleurs from their lands. The minstrels teach Silence the trade, and he quickly excels and travels with them for four years. In order to further conceal his identity, Silence changes his name to Malduit, meaning badly raised child. Out of jealousy over Silence's talent, the minstrels devise a plan to kill Silence. Warned by a dream, Silence avoids harm by parting ways with the minstrels. After Silence returns to Cador's court, King Evan chooses him as a retainer. Queen Eufeme immediately desires Silence, and attempts to seduce him, but Silence escapes the Queen's grasp. From then on, Eufeme curses Silence and seeks his downfall. Months later, the Queen lures Silence into her bedroom again. Once again rejected by Silence, Eufeme fakes having been raped. Evan sympathizes with the Queen but asks her to pretend nothing happened. In return, he sends Silence to the King of France.

Queen Eufeme writes a letter posing as King Evan asking the King of France to behead Silence. The king wants to honor both his friendship with Evan and Silence, so he summons the Counts of Blois, of Nevers, and of Clermont to discuss Silence's fate. The King of France and his counts feel that Silence cannot be put to death as he has already offered Silence a gesture of peace and goodwill, and the king decides to send a letter to Evan to be sure of what he is requesting. Evan is mortified and covers up what has happened. After a war breaks out in England, Evan decides to bring Silence home to help fight. Eufeme then realizes Silence is still alive, and although she is still angry, hearing about his popularity in France makes her fall in love with him again.

Silence and thirty of his companions travel to England; the king orders his men to attack the count who is holding Chester, and is able to seize it. The count's army flees, and Silence injures the count and delivers him to the king. Queen Eufeme tries to make a pass at Silence, but he rejects her a third time. Eufeme becomes overwhelmed with rage. The Queen tells Evan to order Silence to capture Merlin, who cannot be caught other than by "the trick of a woman," which the king does. Silence catches Merlin and they return to King Evan's court. Merlin presents the King with several brief stories to validate himself as a credible source of information; Merlin then reveals Silence's sex to the king and court. Silence explains her way of living, showing the Queen's accusations of rape to be false. The king orders the execution of Eufeme and her cross-dressed lover, who was pretending to be a nun: both are pulled apart by horses. Evan strips Silence of her male clothing, alters her name to the female form Silentia, and makes her his new Queen.

== Themes/motifs ==
=== Nature vs Nurture ===
The debate over Silence between nature and nurture is comparable to present-day debates concerning genes vs. environment. Nature tries to convince Silence into becoming a woman throughout the entire romance because she was born female. Nature plays the underlying role of opposition to Silence's lifestyle because she is trying to become entirely male but we see in the story that gender is tied very closely to biological sex. Nurture, however, is what the entire story is based on: a medieval woman attempting to recreate her image in order to pose as a knight and save her family from harsh inheritance laws. Because she does not dress like a woman or abide by the same gender roles, no one questions her assumed manhood throughout the story. This is because of the importance of appearance and the assumed ubiquity of honesty in this era, which is shattered not only in Silence's revelation, but in the revelation of the Queen's cross-dressing male lover. In the end, despite the story's interesting exploration of gender, Nature emerges victorious, as Silence assumes the female version of her name- Silencia- and becomes the new Queen.

Nurture could possibly be a real person who comes to Silence's aid in fending off the verbal attack of Nature. However, Nurture could also be a figment of Silence's imagination, along with Nature. With this idea they would represent Silence's inner debate about his/her identity and gender. In either case, Nurture states that she "completely dis-natured" Silence through his upbringing (line 2596). Silence was no longer a woman in the eyes of Nurture. He was always taught to be a boy, acted like a boy, and dressed like a boy therefore making him a boy. In this way, gender is determined by outer appearance and upbringing rather than physical attributes. If this was a conversation that Silence imagines in his head, then he believes that his upbringing and childhood made him a man at this time. However, at the end of the novel Nature won the battle for Silence's identity and Silence became a woman in both sex and gender.

Nature and Nurture were portrayed as comical, personified characters who act as part of Silence's conscience. They showed up around the time when Silence was twelve and at odds with her identity. Nature scolded Silence for conducting herself like a man and ruining the special mold that she used for Silence, almost convincing Silence to reveal her true sex. After Nurture arrived, she successfully undid Nature's arguments and, using reason, managed to return Silence to her former way of thinking. After thinking about women's pastimes, Silence saw how much more freedom men had. It would be a waste to throw away his high position just to become a wife in someone's bed( a sentiment which becomes ironic in Silence's returning to womanhood and becoming the wife of the king). Though Nature and Nurture both played a part in how exceptional Silence was, it was Nurture who made him see how much better it was for him to pose as a man. But regardless of Silence's new certainty of gender through the arguments of Nurture, he is never able to fully immerse himself in manhood because of the permanent physical attributes bestowed by Nature, which cannot be undone by Nurture. Society at the time defined gender in regards to aspects of biological sex- genitalia and the ability to reproduce- as well as aspects of behavior- clothing, and daily activities. Though, because the former could not be known to anyone but Silence, they directly affected no one but him.

The theme is common in Old French literature, famously in Chretien de Troyes' Perceval, where the hero's effort to suppress his natural impulse of compassion in favour of what he considers proper courtly behaviour leads to catastrophe. Nature and Nurture appear as two allegorical characters fighting for the mind and body of Silence. Nurture urges Silence to continue life as a man, addressing him as Silencius, while Nature tells her to pursue her true identity as a woman, addressing her as Scilencia. (Note: The author puns on the Latin masculine ending -us by associating it with the Old French us "use, custom, habit"; Car cis us est contre nature, mais l'altres seroit par nature. "For this custom [or: this masculine form] is against nature, but the other would be according to nature." Karen Pratt, "Humour in the Roman de Silence", in: Keith Busby, Roger Dalrymple (eds.), Comedy in Arthurian Literature, 2002, p. 94.)

=== Cross dressing and gender roles ===
Silence embodies absolute physical perfection and engages in outstanding knightly activities that seem impossible for an ordinary human being. This can be considered as a supernatural element in the romance alongside Merlin's existence. Such tropes can be found in most romance or literature pieces, where the protagonist is epitomized as the flawless being that everyone envies and desires.

The underlying code of gender roles requires Silence to be silenced in nature but outspoken in nurture as the underlying rule states that women's opinions should be diminished and men's credited. These fixed gender roles set constraint on what people wish to become. Especially in the case of Silence, her aspiration to inherit lawfully and maintain family duty to her parents left her no choice but to cross-dress as a male for she cannot alter her biological sex. Consequently, she was brought up as a knight in order to have a brighter opportunity and achieve greater accomplishment in life, while demonstrating others that she is indeed a man.

However, Silence has to be subdued in the end as her mixed identity creates considerable hierarchical turmoil to the fixed social order. She broke gender role boundaries temporarily and showed that woman can learn, hunt, and be skillful at knightly activities.

=== Sound vs. Silence ===
There is an ambiguity attributed to this text. The ambiguity of the way the text is discovered adds on to what the roman is about: silence. The roman is about silence, and tells the reader that through the writing, which leads it to not being silent. Writing about silence being silent is an oxymoron. In lines 4320-4326 Queen Eufeme writes a letter,"On behalf of Ebain, her lord, she writes the king of France a letter that he should cut off the head of the messenger who carries the letter to him; that he not spare him this for any reason since he has caused such shame to the king that he does not want to recount it." This letter that Queen Eufeme represents a silent accusation i.e. the letter. She has found a way to silence Silence without using verbal communication, thus keeping to the silence. This shows levels of silence in the text, while the Queen is verbally silent she is not being completely silent because she is using words and language to communicate something. This instance is also reflected in the power of speech and who holds that power. The feminine speech is silenced as seen when Queen Eufeme is killed for her transgressions, while the masculine speech is praised. This can be seen in line 6663 of the poem, "No man alive lamented Eufeme." While the feminine speech is killed the masculine is uplifted. Another instance of silence having levels is in the heroine's name. Silence as a name contains her entire story, her parents specifically pick a name that can be attributed to either gender to not give away the fact that he is actually a she. Silence as a name feels more like a placeholder in this text. In fact names in this roman hold information back rather than give insight. Queen Eufeme's own name reflects speech being a positive thing and yet she is punished for speaking, while Silence is being named to hide who she is and ends up having to speak out about her gender.

Merlin's "sardonic laughter" poses a challenge due to its ability to be both gender neutral and lack gender entirely at the same time. As a masculine role can be distinguished from a feminine role by how much or little is spoken, laughter too can be both masculine and feminine. A loud, belly laugh assumes the masculine role as it removes all other voices, and a soft giggle proves feminine as it is quiet and docile. What makes laughter different is that it falls somewhere on the continuum of sound and silence. Merlins laughter is described as just that, laughter. We don't know whether it is loud or soft.

=== Sex and gender ===
Gender in the text could be seen as binary. Silence's cross-dressing complicates this binary and creates a confusing identity for her as she struggles to determine how she should behave. After several advances by Queen Eufeme the narrator describes Silence as, "li vallés qui est mescine" (l. 3785), "the boy who is a girl". This demonstrates the narrators preference of the masculine identity of Silence, seeing as male pronouns are repeatedly used throughout the poem. The 'boy who is a girl' implies that her behavior, garb, appearance reveals her gender, while her biological sex falls secondary. A personal statement of preferred gender identity of Silence is never mentioned beyond the discussions with the allegorical characters of Nature and Nurture. Nature holds that the truth is in the body; that Silence's true identity lies in her biological sex. On the other hand, Nurture argues that Silence's brave and manly activities have made him a formidable and respectable knight, thus determining his gender. This view of knighthood and armor (an example of gendered clothing) as exclusively male once again reflects the binary nature of gender. There is the potential to view this story through a transgender lens. At the end of the work, when Silence is revealed to be a girl, nature has to do work reshaping his body to appear more feminine. The fact that this transformation was necessary could suggest that Silence was more than just disguised as a man. This act complicates the ending of the tale as it presents a possibility that gender is not a binary after all and maybe Silence is less content with his final transformation to be female than one may at first think.

Additionally, the rhetoric of the Narrator points to the complications that arise when describing Silence's cross-dressing. In some cases, the Narrator describes her actions as "concealment" or as masking the truth. In others, her behavior is described as changing or altering. These variances in the dynamic of the rhetoric indicate the complexities that even the Narrator faces when discussing Silence's cross-dressing in terms of her gender identity.

Critics discuss the motives and interpretation of the poem with the central question "Is this romance ultimately misogynist or philogynous?" Some argue that the character of Silence frees women from the oppressive traditional gendered social expectations, as others discuss the anti-feminist tones used to define other female characters by their gender stereotypes.

=== The name "Silence" ===
Silence was named "Silentia" by her parents and called "Silentius" because of her changed gender. However, she was largely referred to by the gender-neutral name "Silence". In the beginning, Silence was in a way silenced because he could not reveal his true sex as a woman, but he chose his gender to be male. He was only briefly able to speak his opinions as a woman at the end of the story when he claimed that he no longer cared to keep silent any longer. His final monologue was the only time when he was publicly recognized as a woman and able to give his honest opinion. Afterwards, his opinions were no longer stated and he was effectively silenced. Silence was silent in various ways throughout the story.

Instead of being called Silentius, Silence was called by a genderless name as if waiting for the day he would turn back into a woman. It also let Silence maintain a sense of self. During a short period of time, he wanted to be a woman again, but changed his mind. The genderless name helped him lean towards his identity as a female, but also helped him maintain his external identity as a male. The significance of the name and usage of speech by men and women reflected how integral language was to identity and gender.

Another aspect of Silence's name that changes with gender are the pronouns used when talking about her. The use of gender-specific pronouns, helps the reader follow along with which gender Silence is currently portraying. She is born a girl and is referred to with feminine pronouns (she/her/hers). Once her parents decide that she will be raised as a boy, she then starts to be referred to by masculine pronouns (he/him/his). At the end of the story, when Silence's true sex is revealed, the narrator goes back to using feminine pronouns. Some of the pronoun choices may be subject to the opinion of the translator, but for the most part, pronoun choice tends to align with the current gender with which Silence is associating.

Names are significant in this medieval romance as well as the social forces that subordinate women. At the same time, the author altered the structure of medieval society with a character who was woman by nature but through nurture was able to achieve anything that an exceptional man could do.

== In modern culture ==
Fabien Clavel's Les Aventures du chevalier Silence (Paris: Flammarion, Collection "Les Étonnantissimes," 2019) rewrites the medieval tale for a young adult (middle-school) audience. Alex Myers's Story of Silence (Glasgow: HarperVoyager, 2020) is a novel that reimagines the romance and gives voice to the eponymous protagonist. Lofty Durham and Wally M. Cornell adapted the story into the stage play The Book of Silence, which opened at the International Congress on Medieval Studies in Kalamazoo, Michigan in May 2025.

== See also ==
- List of Roman de Silence characters

== Bibliography ==
- Allen, Peter L. (1989). "Ambiguous signs and authorial deceptions in fourteenth-century fictions". In Wasserman, Julian N.; Roney, Lois (eds.). Sign, sentence, discourse : language in medieval thought and literature. Syracuse, NY: Syracuse University Press. ISBN 978-0-8156-2445-5.
- Brewer, Derek S. "The Ideal of Feminine Beauty in Medieval Literature, Especially" Harley Lyrics", Chaucer, and Some Elizabethans." The Modern Language Review (1955): 257-69.
- Burr, Kristin L. "A Question of Honor: Eufeme's Transgressions in Le Roman De Silence." Medieval Feminist Forum 38.1 (2004): 28–37.
- Heldris de Cornuälle (2007). Roche-Mahdi, Sarah (ed.). Silence: a thirteenth-century French romance. East Lansing: Michigan State University Press. ISBN 978-0-87013-543-9.
- Jurney, Florence Ramond. "Secret Identities: (Un)Masking Gender in Le Roman de Silence by Heldris de Cornouäille and L'enfant de sable by Tahar Ben Jelloun." Dalhousie French Studies 55 (2001): 3–10.
- Krueger, Roberta L. "Questions of Gender in Old French Courtly Romance" in The Cambridge Companion to Medieval Romance Cambridge, ed. Roberta L. Krueger, 132–49. Cambridge; New York: Cambridge University Press, 2000.
- Labbie, Erin F. "The Specular Image of the Gender-Neutral Name: Naming Silence in Le Roman de Silence," Arthuriana 7.2 (1997): 63–77.
- Psaki, R., ed. Arthuriana. Special Issue on Le Roman de Silence, Dallas, Southern Methodist University, 7.2 (1997).
- Psaki, R., ed. Arthuriana. Special Issue : Essays on Le Roman de Silence, Dallas, Southern Methodist University, 12.1 (2002).
- Ringer, Loren. "Exchange, Identity and Transvestism in Le Roman de Silence." Dalhousie French Studies 28 (1994): 3–13.
- Roche-Mahdi, Sarah, ed. and trans. Silence. A Thirteenth-Century French Romance, East Lansing, MI: Colleagues Press, 1992.
- Ryder, Mary Ellen and Linda Marie Zaerr. "A Stylistic Analysis of Le Roman de Silence." Arthuriana 18.1 (2008): 22–40.
- Tanner, Heather. "Lords, Wives and Vassals in the Roman de Silence." Journal of Women's History 24.1 (2012): 138–59.
- Terrell, Katherine. "Competing Gender Ideologies and the Limitations of Language in Le Roman de Silence." Romance Quarterly 55.1 (2008): 35–48.
- Thorpe, L. Le Roman de Silence. A Thirteenth-Century Arthurian Verse-Romance by Heldris de Cornuälle, 1972.
