= Pietro Bernardino =

Pietro Bernardino dei Fanciulli (Petrus Bernardinus) (ca. 1475–1502) was a follower of Savonarola.

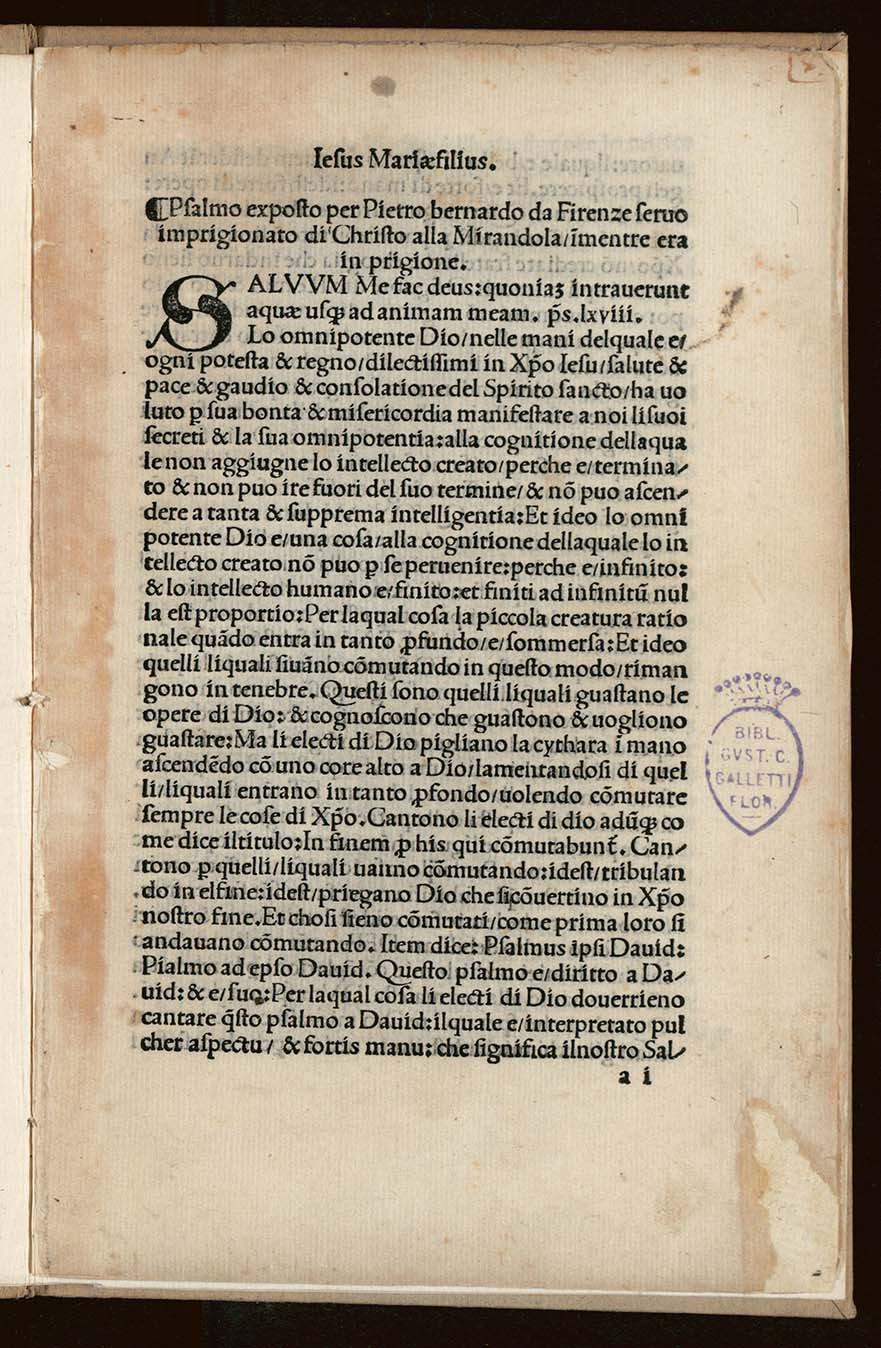
Esposizione del salmo 68, 1500

== Life ==
Bernardino was born in Florence to lower-class parents, and received no higher education. He became a follower of Girolamo Savonarola, attending his sermons and studying his writings, and eventually Bernardino himself began preaching in the public squares of Florence. He called for the Church to be renewed with the sword, and held that until this was accomplished, there was no need to confess, since all priests, secular and regular, were unworthy.

According to the Florentine chronicler Bartolomeo Cerretani, about twenty adherents of Savonarola formed a secret society and elected Peter pope. The latter, who was then twenty-five years old, assumed special ecclesiastical functions and anointed his followers with oil. The members attended no Divine Service, but during their meetings prayed in spirit under the leadership of Peter, whom they regarded as a prophet.

The association was discovered by the archbishop and at his request, the Council of Florence proscribed its meetings. In 1502 the members left the town secretly and proceeded to Mirandola where Count Gian Francesco, a zealous supporter of Savonarola, gave them a friendly reception. When, a little later, the count was besieged by two of his brothers, who claimed Mirandola, Peter declared it God's will that Gian Francesco should overcome his enemies. However, Mirandola was taken and the count lost his territory in August 1502. The sectaries fell into the hands of the victors, Peter and some of his companions were burned as heretics; the remainder were expelled or dispatched to Florence.

Protestants have called Petro Bernardino a proto-Protestant, however Catholic Encyclopedia disputes the claim.
