= Afonso de Alprão =

Portuguese Franciscan friar and writer (died 1422)

Afonso de Alprão (died 1422) was a Portuguese Franciscan friar, writer, royal confessor and papal inquisitor.

== Life ==
Afonso was born in the neighbourhood of Alprão in Santarém, Portugal. He joined the Franciscan order in the province of Santiago de Compostela, which was loyal to Rome during the Western Schism. In 1396–1397, he was studying for his Bachelor of Theology at the Collegio di Spagna of the University of Bologna. He also obtained a licentiate. In 1397, he was a lecturer in the Franciscan convent of San Francesco in Bologna. In 1405, he graduated a Master of Theology from Bologna.

In 1407, Afonso was vicar general of the Franciscans. That same year, he was made procurator of the convent of Santa Clara. In 1412, he was made minister provincial of Santiago. In June 1413, Pope John XXIII named him the inquisitor for Portugal. From 1417 until 1422, he also served as a confessor to King John I of Portugal. He died in 1422.

== Works ==
Tractatus et ars de modo praedicandi in the Bodleian manuscript. Incipit Dividitur iste tractatus in duas partes principales...

In 1397, while a student in Bologna, Afonso wrote a treatise in Latin on the art of preaching, the title of which varies in the two known manuscripts. It is known as Ars praedicandi, conferendi, collationandi, arengandi, secundum multiplicem modum or as Tractatus et ars de modo praedicandi. Both manuscripts spell his name Alphonsus Dalpran. In the manuscript Cracow, Biblioteka Jagiellońska, MS 471, copied in 1444, it accompanies related treatises by Francesc Eiximenis and Thomas de Tuderto. The other manuscript is Oxford, Bodleian Library, MS Hamilton 44, copied in the first half of the 15th century. Albert Hauf has provided a published edition of Afonso's Ars. There is also a published Spanish translation.

Although the first sentence of Afonso's Ars declares that it is divided into two parts, only the first survives. It is itself divided into three unequal sections, the first being by far the longest. It deals with how to introduce a sermon's theme. The theme chosen for his examples in "on her head a crown" (in capite eius corona), taken from Revelation 12:1. Afonso gives ten different means of introduction, including an enthymeme, a quotation from a philosopher and a question. In justifying the length of the first section, he notes that "the introduction alone could suffice for the sermon, as it is done nowadays." The second and third sections deal with the division of the theme and the distinction of its parts, respectively.

== Bibliography ==
- Caplan, Harry (1934). Mediaeval Artes Praedicandi: A Hand-List. Cornell University Press.
- Charland, Thomas-Marie (1936). Artes praedicandi: contribution à l'histoire de la rhétorique au Moyen Âge. Ottawa: Institut d'Études Médiévales.
- Costa Gomes, Rita (2003). The Making of a Court Society: Kings and Nobles in Late Medieval Portugal. Cambridge University Press.
- Farmhouse Alberto, Paulo (2024). "Portugal (950–1400)". In Francesco Stella; Lucie Doležalová; Danuta Shanzer (eds.). Latin Literatures of Medieval and Early Modern Times in Europe and Beyond: A Millennium Heritage. John Benjamins. pp. 158–167.
- Hauf, Albert G., ed. (1979). "El Ars Praedicandi de Fr. Alfonso d'Alprão, OFM: aportación al estudio de la teoría de la predicación en la Península Ibérica". Archivum Franciscanum Historicum. 72: 233–329.
- Lázaro Pulido, Manuel; Álvarez Alonso, José Félix (2013). "El Ars praedicandi de Alfonso de Alprão: introducción y traducción". Revista Filosófica de Coimbra (43): 209–282.
- Moutinho Rodrigues, André (2019). "A consciência de Avis: aproximação prosopográfica dos confessores da família real portuguesa (1385–1481)". En la España Medieval. 42: 181–210.
- Wenzel, Siegfried (2015). Medieval 'Artes Praedicandi': A Synthesis of Scholastic Sermon Structure. University of Toronto Press.
