= The Oxford Dictionary of Late Antiquity =

Oxford reference work on late antiquity

Oxford Dictionary of Late Antiquity
- Cover of the 1st Edition
- Author: Oliver Nicholson (ed.)
- Language: English
- Subject: Late Antiquity
- Genre: Reference work
- Publisher: Oxford University Press
- Publication date: 2018
- Pages: 1,744
- ISBN: 9780198662778
- OCLC: 1030905378

The Oxford Dictionary of Late Antiquity (ODLA) is the first comprehensive, multi-disciplinary reference work covering culture, history, religion, and life in Late Antiquity. This was the period in Europe, the Mediterranean, and the Near East from about AD 250 to 750. Written by more than 400 contributors and edited by Oliver Nicholson, the Oxford Dictionary of Late Antiquity was published in 2018. It connects the period in history between those covered in the Oxford Classical Dictionary and The Oxford Dictionary of the Middle Ages. The print edition is in two volumes, Volume I: A–I; Volume II: J–Z.

== Sources ==
- Nicholson, Oliver, ed. (2018). The Oxford Dictionary of Late Antiquity. Oxford University Press. doi:10.1093/acref/9780198662778.001.0001. ISBN 9780191744457.
