= Arrabbiati =

The Arrabbiati ('Enraged') were a faction in the Republic of Florence that opposed the rule of the House of Medici. They also opposed the rule of Girolamo Savonarola (1494–1498) for being insufficiently anti-Medicean, for excessive religious zeal or for his pro-French foreign policy. They supported an aristocratic republic and were aligned with the Papacy and Ludovico Sforza.

They arose in the second half of the 15th century. During Savonarola's rule, they opposed an increase in the number of guards posted in public. After Savonarola's execution, there was a failed attempt at rapprochement between his followers, the Piagnoni, and the Arrabbiati in 1499. With Piero de' Medici preparing to attack Florence in December 1500, the two factions entered into an alliance. This was arranged through a series of large dinners at the houses of various prominent persons.

By 1527, the Arrabbiati were increasingly aligned ideologically with the Piagnoni, with whom they shared the government of the Second Florentine Republic (1527–1530). They were increasingly treated as a single republican faction and the Arrabbiati folded into the Piagnoni by their opponents, like Leonardo Buonafede.

The most prominent family in the camp of the Arrabbiati was the Pazzi. Lesser families included the Martelli, Giugni, Canacci and Da Diacceto. Francesco Guicciardini names the following prominent Arrabbiati who opposed Savonarola:

- Guido Antonio Vespucci
- Piero Capponi
- Tanai de' Nerli
- Lorenzo di Pierfrancesco de' Medici
- Bernardo Rucellai
- Piero Alberti

== Sources ==
- Baker, Nicholas Scott (2013). The Fruit of Liberty: Political Culture in the Florentine Renaissance, 1480–1550. Harvard University Press.
- Najemy, John M. (2006). A History of Florence, 1200–1575. Blackwell.
- Polizzotto, Lorenzo (1994). The Elect Nation: The Savonarolan Movement in Florence 1494–1545. Clarendon Press.
