= Paulus Kölner =

De arte predicationis

Paulus Kölner (died 1384) was a German clergyman and theologian. He was a native of Oberhaunstadt. He served as a canon of Passau Cathedral and Regensburg Cathedral and was a magister decretorum, having a master's degree in canon law. He was elected bishop of Regensburg but died before taking office.

Paulus's known works are:

- De paenitentia et remissione ('On penance and remission'), sometimes misattributed to Henry of Langenstein
- De arte predicationis (incipit Ad honorem sancte et individue trinitatis), a treatise on the art of preaching
- Tractatulus de septem horis canonicis ('Little tract on the seven canonical hours'), completed while he was bishop elect

== Bibliography ==
- Caplan, Harry (1934). Mediaeval Artes Praedicandi: A Hand-List. Cornell University Press.
- Hilg, Hardo (2007). Lateinische mittelalterliche Handschriften in Quarto der Universitätsbibliothek Augsburg die Signaturengruppen Cod. I.2.4° und Cod. II.1.4°. Harassowitz.
- Hägele, Günter (1996). Lateinische mittelalterliche Handschriften in Folio der Universitätsbibliothek Augsburg: Die Signaturengruppe Cod. I.2.2° und Cod. II.1.2° 1–90 (PDF). Harassowitz.
- Schott, Gerhard (1979). Die lateinischen mittelalterlichen Handschriften der Universitätsbibliothek München die Handschriften aus der Folioreihe. Vol. 3. Harassowitz.

Preceded by Theoderich von Abensberg	Bishop elect of Regensburg; 1383–1384	Succeeded by Johann von Moosburg

VIAF 35552903
