= Pastoralia (disambiguation) =

Pastoralia is a short story collection by George Saunders.

Pastoralia may also refer to:

- Pastoralia (genre), a genre of late medieval theological literature
- Pastoralia (Boiardo) (1463–1464), a collection of ten poems by Matteo Maria Boiardo
- Pastoralia: A Manual of Helps for the Parochial Clergy (1830), a book by Henry Thompson (priest)

== See also ==
- Pastoral
- Pastor
- Pastora, Spanish/Catalan electronic group active in the 2000s–2010s
- Pastoria, fictional king in Oz books by L. Frank Baum
