= West Tilbury =

Village in England

Coordinates: 51°28′35″N 0°23′23″E

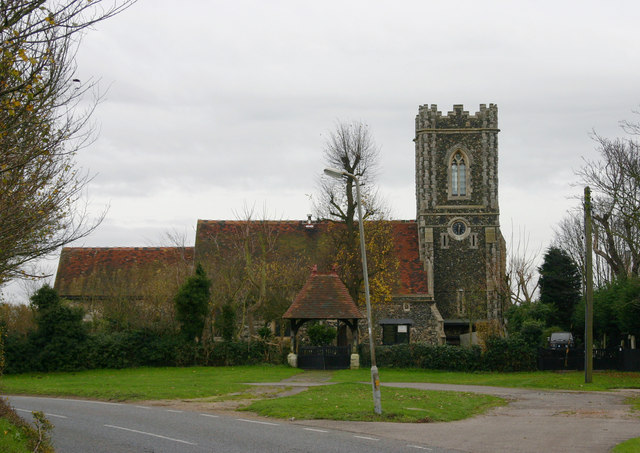
- Former parish church of St James, now a house

- Location within Essex
- OS grid reference: TQ665785
- Unitary authority: Thurrock
- Ceremonial county: Essex
- Region: East
- Country: England
- Sovereign state: United Kingdom
- Post town: TILBURY
- Postcode district: RM18
- Dialling code: 01375
- Police: Essex
- Fire: Essex
- Ambulance: East of England
- UK Parliament: Thurrock

West Tilbury is a village in the borough of Thurrock in Essex, England. It stands on a 30-metre (98 ft) high ridge of land overlooking the River Thames. It lies 1.5 miles (2.4 km) north-east of Tilbury, its post town.

West Tilbury and neighbouring East Tilbury had formed a single territory in Saxon times, which subsequently fragmented into two parishes. Tilbury Fort on the River Thames was built in the reign of Henry VIII as part of London's defences against an attack from France. The fort straddled the parishes of West Tilbury and Chadwell St Mary. The new town of Tilbury grew up around docks built to the west of the fort in the 19th century. Although sharing its name with West Tilbury and East Tilbury, the town of Tilbury was in Chadwell St Mary parish.

The civil parish of West Tilbury was abolished in 1936 on the creation of Thurrock Urban District, which in turn became the modern borough of Thurrock in 1974. The ecclesiastical parish has also been abolished, and the area now forms part of a Church of England ecclesiastical parish called "East and West Tilbury and Linford".

== Geography ==
West Tilbury lies in the extreme south of Essex, fronting the Thames. About half of its land surface is Thames alluvium (clay), the inland portion rising as a dramatic gravel ridge (about 30 metres (98 ft) OD). Upon its northward border with Mucking parish there are limited sandy loams. The substratum is of Thanet Sands, which in turn overlie a considerable depth of chalk. A post-glacial stream valley transects the gravel ridge along the north parish edge, revealing slight surface yellow sands (Thanets), over a generally gravely agricultural surface. Some large nodules of flint, and erratic Bunter pebbles surface on the valley bottom. The rich soils of the southward Thames alluvium have been reclaimed from a former natural (tidal) saltmarsh state, being gradually embanked from the medieval onward. An Inquisition of 1362 refers to one marsh on the manor as already within a 'wall'. The last major 'inning' or reclamation for agricultural land came in the 1720s. A significant creek once ran inland to near the Domesday manor centre at Hall Hill, but this was blocked off, apparently in the mid 16th century. Its inlet, known to rivermen as Bill Meroy Creek, allowed the access of small vessels to the Marsh Farm (near Tilbury Fort) to within living memory.

Earlier agricultural regimes over the parish embraced mixed farming (cattle, grasses, cereals, beans) upon the 'upland' gravel heights, where, before present demands upon the water table, numerous surface springs, brooks and ponds existed, and intensive marshland sheep husbandry (producing ewes' milk and cheeses for the local and wider markets). In the 21st century, the agricultural picture is one of interesting variety within a wholly arable framework, with rotations which include oilseed rapes, barley, potatoes, springreens, salad onions and some maize corn across the high, lighter soils, and rape, potatoes and wheat upon the low lying clays. A few runner beans and small herbs such as coriander are cultivated on suitable loamy patches near the village centre.

== History ==
=== Archaeology ===
The 30-metre (98 ft) gravel terrace within the parish produces numerous examples of pointed hand axes of the Lower Palaeolithic (Old Stone Age); some evidence of Mousterian (Neanderthal) tools has been found close to the village centre. A massive presence of post-glacial peoples Maglemosian along the northern stream valley abutting Mucking parish is indicated by the finding of flint production-cores and blades, together with the characteristic tranchet axes, adzes and flint picks ('Thames Picks') of Mesolithic hunter-gatherers. Occupation continued through the Neolithic, doubtless closely associated with the nearby Orsett causewayed enclosure. These early farmers appear to have been more prevalent upon the upper slopes (gravels) above the aforesaid valley than their Middle Stone Age predecessors. A continuity of field systems throughout the Bronze and Iron Ages is apparent. During 2010, excavations north of Mill House uncovered a Later Bronze Age burial mound (barrow) and other pre-Roman features.

A Claudian period rectangular defensive enclosure on Gun Hill was excavated in the late 1960s (finds at Thurrock Museum). A most important migration period (c.600 AD) grubenhaus – a sunken floored hut – was examined, also in the late 1960s during gravel extraction. It indicates the early Anglo-Saxonisation of the area from c. 450 AD onward and is similar to the numerous other grubenhauser 2 kilometres (1.2 mi) away on the Mucking hilltop.

In 2000, a twisted gold wire torc with decorated buffer finials, probably of 1st century B.C. date, was discovered by an agricultural worker here. It was illegally disposed of and is now lost to the archaeological record, but photos taken at the time of finding indicate it was similar to torc-types from the Waldalgesheim chariot burial in the Rhineland.

=== Hedges and woodland ===
Upon the reclaimed marshland, the traditional division of fields (called 'hopes') was by drainage ditches ('water-fences'). These soon develop effusions of phragmites reed, bramble, and wild sloe but are periodically redug and so do not grow into lasting hedges. The upland fields were formerly criss-crossed by lofty columns of elm. This tree is now decimated, but a continuously reviving (cloning) scrub prevails within hedgerows of more mixed character. In places, very ancient fragments of hedgeline survive, giving beautiful ranges of hazel, spindle, field maple, oak, ash and with representative ground flora such as red campion, stitchwort and bluebell. Regrettably, the introduced herb called 'Alexanders' (Smyrnium olusatrum) is now colonising most of West Tilbury's lanes, to the detriment of the richer mosaic of small plants.

Several notable but very small and vulnerable areas of ancient woodland can still be seen. Known as Ashen Shaw, Rainbow Shaw and Shrove Hill, each adheres to the parish boundary, a noticeable feature of many ancient woodlands in the district. The former takes its name from its outline, being set on the northern edge of West Tilbury in a curve around the stony hill summit. In spring its canopy of wild cherries in blossom is a continuing delight. Its ancient coppice stools include field maple, ash, crab apple, hornbeam and oak (Q.robur), while the woodland floor is prolific with violets, native bluebell and wild arum. Pignut is also present. Shrove Hill, upon the west boundary with Chadwell, is so called from 'shrough', an old word for rough woodland. Another tiny parcel of wood is Coopers Shaw – the latter an elm thicket of more recent origin. The local word 'shaw' derives from a medieval term for woodland which was usually managed as coppice.

=== Field systems ===
The field enclosures are recorded over the past 400 years or more, beginning with John Walker's manor survey of 1584, to more modern maps

Additionally a 'terrier' notebook (an account of land details) dating from the 1780s describes every West Tilbury farm and field with its crops; tallies of livestock etc. The present day field systems have developed as farming needs require from those which the above earlier maps describe, and, apart from hedge removal and general enlargement of the plots, show no marked difference (in some cases, the enclosure shapes of 1584 are still evident).

=== The common fields ===
Unique to this part of Essex, West Tilbury still has a large expanse of unenclosed (unhedged) land known as 'Great Common'. This was one of the three medieval areas of strip field, on which the manorial farmers worked their individual copyhold ribbons of ground. It lies backing the village Green and public house. There was another comparable area off Low Street Lane, known as the 'Little Common', where similarly the individual strips (called 'dayworks' here in the medieval period) were marked out by posts or other distinguishing features. The last of these posts – of cast iron – were re-erected in 1868 and bear the name of Sir John Cass, whose charity school at Aldgate owned an estate and strip plots here.

=== Agriculture ===
Unusually for south Essex, West Tilbury continued to operate some open field farming well into the 19th century. Although they were in the open field, individual holdings were freehold. There were occasional disputes as to the location of these holdings. In due course, the two institutional land owners – the Sir John Cass Foundation and the town of Henley on Thames – erected markers to define their holdings.

Earlier agricultural regimes over the parish embraced mixed farming (cattle, grasses, cereals, beans) upon the 'upland' gravel heights, where, before present demands upon the water table, numerous surface springs, brooks and ponds existed, and intensive marshland sheep husbandry (producing ewes' milk and cheeses for the local and wider markets).

=== West Tilbury Commons ===
Also survivals of medieval manor farming practice, these are the zones of grassland reserved for the commoners of the township – those who held the copyholds (or later freeholds) of the dozen or more farms within the parish. Each was allowed to graze a certain number of bullocks, cows or sheep upon the commons between spring and late autumn. By the 18th century, this regulation of the manor court was being abused, and various unauthorised villagers let their animals onto the grounds to feed. In 1895 an Act of Parliament finally set up a regulatory body known as the West Tilbury Common Conservators, allows the proper use of the several parts of the Commons.

The West Tilbury Commons at present cover above 100 acres (40 ha) of the parish, the smallest portion being the central area of village Green. This was originally (from about 1257) the market square (held each Wednesday) set up by Richard de Tilbury, the manor lord. Adjacent to it, was the manor pond, doubtless an important feature in an age when rural markets were supplied by pack-horses coming from considerable distances. The annual St. James' fair also took place here, and Walker's mapping of 1584 refers to it as the 'Fayer Green'. The larger areas of common grazing lay farther off: Hall Common (south of the manor house) 13 acres (5.3 ha); Parsonage Common (near the medieval parsonage house) 15 acres (6.1 ha); Tilbury Fort Common 16 acres (6.5 ha) and 20 acres (8.1 ha); Walton Common (close to the Tilbury Power Station) 24 acres (9.7 ha); fringes of Fort Road 15 acres (6.1 ha).

=== Development and industry ===
Remarkably, within an area of past industrialisation, West Tilbury has remained more or less intact as an agricultural parish. This is largely due to the influence of the (now) major landowner, the C. H. Cole and Sons farming estate, which is based at the Mill House Farm. Present in the parish since the mid Victorian years, previous family representatives resisted the influences which saw surrounding areas urbanised. A minimal piece of the parish near Tilbury Town was developed for housing with the arrival of the East and West India Co. docks, c.1883, and the ancient Marsh Farm (Meroys) was utilised for the nearby town's sewage works. To east of Tilbury Fort (which stands partly on the West Tilbury marsh and partly in the next-door parish of Chadwell) the 1950s saw the building of the first of two giant power stations, the later of which still dominates the parish foreshore. Random surface destruction in the form of scattered gravel workings ('ballast-holes') either open or infilled, is evident in places, one of the 19th-century quarries being now overgrown and serving as a pleasant scouting camp-ground. The alluvial marshgrounds were transected by a railway line (London, Tilbury and Southend Railway) in 1854–55, with a small station being erected at Low Street a half dozen years later. It was demolished under the Beeching cuts in 1969. West Tilbury is one of the three proposed sites for a new Thames bridging scheme and motorway link within the next decade.

== The parish ==
Bede's History of the English Church talks of a minster church established by St Cedd at Tilaburg. A case has been made that this was West Tilbury, however, majority opinion favours East Tilbury. The West Tilbury parish church was dedicated to St James (The Great) whose saint's day is 25 July, upon which the West Tilbury fair was held annually. Most of the windows appear to be 14th century. It is now a private dwelling. William Laud, later Archbishop of Canterbury, was appointed rector of West Tilbury in 1609.

=== St. James' Church and the parish ===
The parish church was St James, a grade II* listed building. It is constructed from flint and rubble and was restored by W Benton. It contains remnants of Early Norman windows. There is an elaborate memorial in the chancel to Lady Gordon and to her husband, the reverend Sir Adam Gordon (3rd Baronet) who was rector from 1796 to 1817.

=== The churchyard ===
The apsidal form of the eastern churchyard, upon a considerable lynchet edge, may suggest that originally the church was positioned upon an oval mound of earlier (perhaps religious) importance. On the west it abuts the manor hall grounds. The soil here is deep gravel, which quickly disposes of organic remains. Fragments of the 1883 period oakslat fence survive upon the east and north and there is a Victorian timber lych gate, recently retiled with red terracotta dragon finials. The burial yard in that period was enclosed by a stone wall, referred to in the parochial returns of 1565 as somewhat 'broken down' and to be repaired. Its flint base has recently been revealed during clearing operations. The ground is the traditional acre, with a range of 18th and 19th century headstones, many in imported limestone. A few are of military interest, and several notable village farming names occur: COLE, TALMASH, ASPLIN etc. The burial area was extended downslope upon a piece of agricultural land given by George Burness, of the Hall, consecrated in December 1921 and partly planted round its perimeter with cherry-plum saplings. The churchyard contains the war graves of two British Army soldiers of World War II.

=== Rectors ===
The identities of the earliest (Norman period) rectors are not known. A parson of Tilbury called Richard is named in a property transaction of 1223–4 and in 1228 William, rector of Little (West) Tilbury is recorded. The first rector for whom we have a surname is William de Hareworth who was presented by the King (Edward I). The scholastic author Simon Alcock was rector from before 1422 until 1428. The last rector of the separate parish of West Tilbury was the Rev. Dudley A. Whitwham, who held office between 1954 and 1971. Thereafter a priest-in-charge, Leonard James Middleton officiated at St. James' until 1977, when the parishes were united.

=== The Parsonage House ===
Otherwise known in recent centuries as 'The Rectory', the medieval priests' dwelling was situated in the Glebe field area, to S. East of St. James' churchyard, close to the foot of what is now Cooper Shaw Road. Pottery of the 13th century onwards has been recorded on the site together with roofing tile from the house and buildings. It was here also that the 18th century 'Rectors' Well' for medicinal water was pumped.

For a short while under the incumbency Rev. David Evans in the 1780s, a house on the Green (Well House) was used as the parson's home, and about a decade later, the Rev. Adam Gordon purchased the 'Bell Inn' public house at the Gun Hill corner, converting it into a handsome parsonage house. This gave its name to Rectory Road, and served as the home of West Tilbury's future rectors from about 1799 until the mid 20th century, when it was sold off and demolished. Some elements of its old garden remain amongst wooded scrubland on the site.

=== West Tilbury Medicinal Waters ===
During much of the 18th century, the village was noted for its medicinal springwaters; the most famous of which was pumped from under the Hall Farm kitchen area. The water was soon observed to cure various cattle complaints and was eventually sent for testing by some notable London chemists, (1736). One of these was Dr. John Andree, one of the founders of the London Hospital. Among his several publications is a pamphlet outlining the efficacy of the 'Tilbury Water'. Numerous testimonials were made to its value, especially in the relief of 'bloody fluxes' and various enteric disorders. It was sold both at the village and from the London warehouse of John Ellison, whose initials appear upon the only known complete surviving quart glass bottle (Thurrock Museum).

With the 1780s, competition arose when the rector of St. James', the Rev. David Evans, began to market a springwater from his rectory house yard (which stood upon the same hill as the Hall). This was sold from Owen's warehouse in Saville Row near Temple Bar. The attempt to impose this 'inferior' substitute on the public probably lasted less than a decade (the Rev. D. Evans died early 1795), by which time the West Tilbury springs were in any case falling from public awareness. In 1803 it was described as 'occasionally resorted to' and the parish rate records do not refer to the main well-site after 1807.

=== Administrative history ===
West Tilbury was an ancient parish in the Barstable Hundred of Essex. When elected parish and district councils were established in 1894, it was included in the Orsett Rural District. The civil parish and rural district were abolished in 1936, when the area became part of the new Thurrock Urban District. At the 1931 census (the last before the abolition of the civil parish), West Tilbury had a population of 444.

The parish of East Tilbury has also been abolished for ecclesiastical purposes, and the area now forms part of a Church of England ecclesiastical parish called "East and West Tilbury and Linford", with St Catherine's Church at East Tilbury serving as the parish church.

== Heritage and notable buildings ==
West Tilbury has one of the seven conservation areas in Thurrock. The conservation area was designated in 1991 to protect the character of the historic core of the village.

The West Tilbury area also has several notable historic buildings. Most notable is Tilbury Fort (English Heritage), a mid-late 17th century star-fort commanding the narrow (900-metre-wide (3,000 ft)) passage of the Thames. It is well documented in available guide books, though these concentrate largely on the fort's strategic concept, layout and architecture. The military men's social life is less accentuated. Public access is year-round and there are useful exhibitions within.

Other heritage buildings are either central or peripheral to the inland village itself and, taken as a group, demonstrate admirably the local vernacular, plan and style of the late 15th to mid 19th centuries within the locality. West Tilbury Hall, Condovers (now Walnut Tree Cottage) and Marshalls are all early Tudor timber framed (oak and elm) hall-houses with crosswings. Of these, West Tilbury Hall is the largest, with fine Tudor brick cellars under its rear projection. This is the only moated site within the parish, one fragment only of the wide dry ditch remaining at the south garden edge, next to the churchyard. Polwicks at Low Street represents the newer Renaissance house of the early 17th century (about 1620), again timber framed but of double-pile arrangement (two houseframes side by side), while Manor Farm (currently called The White House), is of the late 17th century, being essentially one pile or houseframe of double length to the previous. It reflects foreign softwood timbers coming in from Scandinavia (Norwegian fir) and is largely weatherboard clad.

The move to brick, which became a village feature from the 18th century, is represented in The King's Head (c.1770s with additions) but this, like the Post Office of c.1810 has been stucco faced. The upper windows of this important building above a pleasant shopfront bow, have been atrociously replaced in the late 20th century. The Old Bakery on the Green is therefore the best example to seek – a compact yellow stockbrick home of small scale and with appropriate windows, built in the 1830s. A little outside the village, at Gunhill Farm and the Mill House Farm, are two characteristic early Victorian villa-type residences, erected for prosperous farming and milling families, the first in 1839 and the latter in 1850. They reflect the comfortable style of town-influenced architecture which replaced outdated farmstead homes throughout the district over much of the 19th century.

Well House, which overlooks the Green, gives the impression of being an early Victorian residence of yellow stock brick. Its interior however, reveals late 15th century timber framing. A probable crosswinged hall-house of that period seems subsequently to have been remodelled to a 17th-century building of elongate form. This is shown upon Charles Sloane's map of 1742. In 1794 it was described in the Sun Fire Assurance ledgers as 'Lath and Plaister and tyled', serving at that period as the rectory house for parson David Evans. About 50 years later, its frontage would be cased in with local brick.

Its origins are possibly very ancient, for in the deeds of Merton College, Oxford is a document of 1272 relating to West Tilbury, to which several local landholders were witness, including 'John of the Well' (de fonte). The Saxon word 'well' meant a spring of water, or natural fountain. The pond adjacent to Well House is fed by a gravel spring, which is dammed at its south-western end above the small valley.

Situated to one side of the Memorial Hall, The Schoolhouse is a gabled slate-roofed building of yellow stock brick with red courses, a typical example of late Victorian 'board-school' architecture. Currently it stands empty, its final use having been a council depot for storing and repairing grass cutting equipment. The iron-railed and tarmaced playground looks onto Rectory Road. It opened in 1876 with capacity to take 66 children from infant stage through to school-leaver age, an average attendance in the mid-1880s being 55 scholars. The 1891 census indicated a considerable gipsy camp had arrived on the West Tilbury common and the presence of this population together with new docks overspill led to the extension of the schoolhouse in 1894. In 1913, it was described in the local newspaper as a 'comprehensive' and as late as the 1930s, under the charge of a headmistress and 2 teachers, as many as 118 children were on its register. Closure came with Friday, 22 July 1960 when transfer to the newly formed Torrells School, some distance off at Little Thurrock, commenced for seniors, the younger children moving mainly to Chadwell. The headteachers' log books are not present in any known public archive – a significant loss to the social story of the village.

=== West Tilbury Village Hall ===
The Village Hall (Memorial Hall), was opened in 1924 by Captain E. A. Loftus, in remembrance of those local men who gave their lives in World War I. The names are recorded on a memorial tablet in St. James's Church, in the village hall and on the village hall website. Located in Rectory Road and on the southern edge of the great common field, the hall was built using funds raised within the village and by donations from local landowners. The hall is available for hire and thereby continues to serve the wider community to the present day as the hub of village activity. West Tilbury Village Hall is a registered charity supported by local residents and their fund raising activities.

== Notable people ==
- Emily Mary Osborn (1828–1925), or Osborne, was an English painter of the Victorian era. She was born in Essex, the eldest of nine children of a clergyman. She was educated at Dickinson's Academy in London. In 1851, at the age of seventeen, Osborn began showing her work in the annual Royal Academy exhibits, and continued to do so over a span of four decades (to 1893). She was best known for her pictures of children and her genre paintings, especially on themes of women in distress.
- Ernest Achey Loftus has claim to be the world's most durable diarist, having kept a detailed journal, with brief periods of omission, over 91 years, between 1896 and 1987.
- Gervase of Tilbury. Born in the 1150s, author of the 'Otia Imperialia', a medieval work which enjoyed a wide currency in the later Middle Ages and was twice translated into French. Some thirty manuscripts of his writing survive, one of which (in the Vatican library), has corrections and additions in Gervase's own hand. It was intended as a volume of instruction and entertainment for the Roman Emperor Otto IV (c.1175–1218), the son of Queen Matilda of England and grandson to Henry II of England.
- John Nevison also known as William Nevison, was one of Britain's most notorious highwaymen, a gentleman-rogue supposedly nicknamed Swift Nick by King Charles II after a renowned 200-mile (320 km) dash from Kent to York to establish an alibi for a robbery he had committed earlier that day. The story inspired William Harrison Ainsworth to include a modified version in his novel Rookwood, in which he attributed the feat to Dick Turpin.

== Elizabeth's Armada Camp ==
Elizabeth I's famous Armada Speech was given in West Tilbury while she was reviewing troops gathered to defend against the Spanish Armada. Confusion has arisen as to exactly where the royal review took place. Various locations became favoured, especially that of Tilbury Fort itself. Other authorities decided for the high ground surrounding St James' church, or the plateau top of Gun Hill. Early in the 18th century, an accurate county historian, William Holman, had concluded that the field of parade on that historic occasion, had been just outside the village centre near the windmill and this location was offered again in Philip Morant's 'History and Antiquities ...', 1768.

As 1988 approached, the local council (Thurrock Borough) became involved in preparations for a re-enactment of the historic scenes somewhere in the village surrounds and the local museum undertook to finally answer the locational question. The project ranged between archival research at the British Museum, where two important maps by the military surveyor Robert Adams were examined, and fieldwork around the parish (1986). The project resulted in certifying that Holman had been correct. 'The place of assemblie at armes', where the speech had been given was certainly in fields beside the manorial post mill, but there was another important site a little to the south-west, on the present Gun Hill summit. Here, overlooking the fort and Gravesend, had stood the Lord General's pavilion, doubtless with the other richly adorned tents of the Earl of Leicester's staff officers close by. The queen had moved to this site to dine among her captains after the parade.

Such images of spectacular ceremonial and royal glamour all apply to the two days of Elizabeth's visit – 8 and 9 August 1588. The Camp Royal itself had been in preparation for several weeks beforehand. On the river, just downstream of the Tudor blockhouse (fort), a defensive boom made of ships' masts and anchors was being constructed at a cost of over £2,000.

The numbers of soldiers present at the time of the queen's visit is not clear. Over the month or so of the great army's presence at West Tilbury, between 17,000 and 22,000 men are said to have lain in camp, but certainly not all served throughout.

The high stone tower of St. James' is the most likely visual communications station to have served the Armada camp, conveying signals via all waterfront blockhouses, Leicester's pavilion, Gravesend and the ports of the Downs, (exploiting the Kentish hilltops). Eastward, it looked far beyond Sheppey, where the uppermost turrets of Queenborough held a beacon facility. Ranging the Thames during the invasion scare were two specially appointed watch vessels, the 'Victory' and 'Lion', while the fishermen of Leigh – a small seaport visible with moderate eyesight from the West Tilbury fields – were primed to give warning of the presence of any hostile galley to speedy English pinnaces patrolling the estuary. Leigh-on-Sea's pale 15th-century tower still carried its masonry beacon turret, as does that of nearer church of St. Michael's, Fobbing.

On the day of her arrival by royal barge from London (8 August), the queen's progress, (after being received by the Earl of Leicester at the blockhouse fort), was across the mile or so of marshland below the church and Tilbury Hill. Robert Adam's detailed 'second' map depicts the route of her coach over the raised marshland – 'the causey from the forte to ye Campe' – where he shows the positions of groups of guards, with no less than 34 fluttering ensigns (banners) along the way:

The drums do sound, the phifes [pipes] do yield their notes

And ensigns are displayed ... They couch their pikes and bowe their ensigns downe

When as their sacred royal Queene past by ...

So tells James Aske in his contemporary verse-picture of the royal visit, called 'Elizabetha Triumphans'.

After an initial visit to the camp, the queen continued on through the narrow lane which led northwards out of West Tilbury, onto Mucking hilltop and thence toward Horndon on the Hill, where she was to stay the night at the manor house called 'Cantis', the home of 'Master Edward Rich'. Upon the morning of 9 August, a return journey through the valley of 'Howe ford' was made, climbing finally to the 'place of assemblie at armes', where the great review was to be enacted and Elizabeth's historic speech delivered.

West Tilbury's highest unwooded ground provided the queen's parade area – some 17 acres (6.9 ha) of common strip field, lying eastward from the windmill and with clear views of the distant Thames, beyond (modern) Southend. From this dry gravely hilltop, the landscape fell to a small tree-crowned valley, across which, perhaps, a mock skirmish, 'of two battalions' described by the ballad maker Thomas Deloney: 'such a battaile pitcht in England many a day had not been seene'.

Spanish captives, destined for confinement at Richard Drake's house near Esher, were brought into the queen's presence. Among them was Pedro de Valdez, General of the Andalusian squadron, which had sailed with the Armada from Lisbon. Interrogated by the Privy Council as to why Philip's armies had put forth, Don Pedro answered; 'Why, but to subdue your nation, and root you all out'. All, he said, meant both Catholic and Protestant alike – to send the former 'good men' to heaven, and 'all you that are heretics, to hell'. The drift of this bloody message was ordered to be read out to the trained bands by the camp's chaplain next sermon.

Reaching the queen whilst at dinner, came the earliest dispatches from Francis Drake aboard Revenge, reporting the Spanish fleet already hastening in the eastern channel; less joyous was other news that the Duke of Parma's squadrons lying in the Netherlands, were immediately to sail for the invasion of the south of England.

It was a false alarm. By mid August, the Camp Royal was discontinued, its warriors, ill-fed and wanting wages despite royal promises, were drifting homeward. The Surrey contingent's records reveal dreadful confusion over equipment and misplacement of 'furniture'; as the camp dispersed. William Virtell of Croydon claimed that his morion helmet of iron had been taken by Lieutenant Pavett who 'gave him a worste for it'. Numerous men were pressed into sea-service before they could officially leave the military zone. Thus Edward Upchurch of Surrey lost his equipment (a firearm, powder flask and 'tuch box') aboard a ship called the Rose or the Lion. Another soldier called Merce 'lefte his musket in pawne', while Anthonie Clarke's complaint was that he had served his country at Tilbury 'one whole week with a calliver and had no paie'.
