= Hermannus Teutonicus =

Hermann Oorwist, known as Hermannus Teutonicus or Theutonicus, was a 14th-century Dominican preacher and author. According to Laurent Pinon, he wrote the following three works:

- Liber de ascensu cordis
- Distinctiones super Cantica
- Tractatus de arte praedicandi, a treatise on the technical art of preaching that is apparently lost

Hermann is the anonymous "N. Teutonicus" mentioned by Leandro Alberti. His surname, Oorwist, is known only from a marginal note in a copy of Alberti, which was seen by Pedro de Alva.
