= Kings Head, West Tilbury =

Public house in Essex, England

Coordinates: 51°28′35″N 0°23′24″E

Kings Head
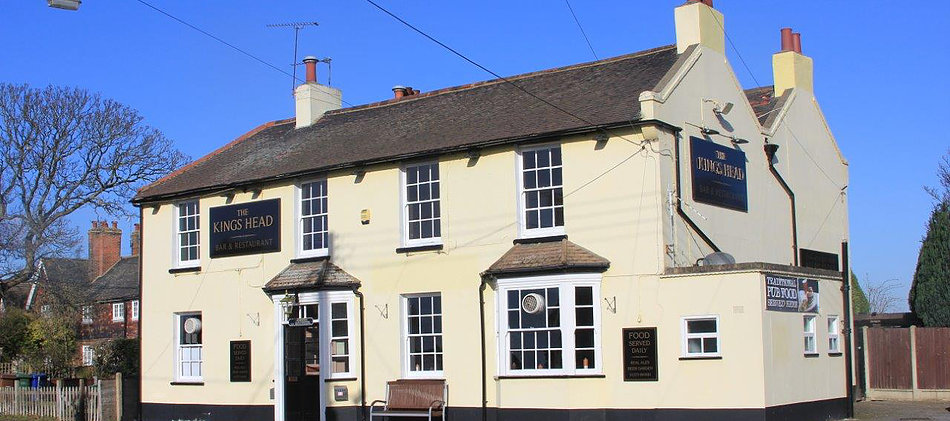
- The Kings Head 2017

General information
- Type: Public house
- Location: The Green, Rectory Road, RM18 8TU, West Tilbury, Essex
- Current tenants: Pub currently closed
- Construction started: 18th century

Design and construction
- Designations: Grade II listed

The Kings Head Pub is a grade II listed pub in the conservation area of West Tilbury, in the Thurrock district, in the ceremonial county of Essex, England. The pub closed in 2015 and in May 2016 Punch Taverns sold the pub, as part of their corporate strategy, to housing developers.

An Asset of Community Value order has been placed on The Kings Head by Thurrock Council, offering protection against any housing development.

== Architecture and history ==
The Kings Head has been listed Grade II on the National Heritage List for England since November 1981.
