= Grays =

(The) Grays or (The) Greys may refer to:

== Places ==
- Grays Bay, Nunavut, Canada
- Grays, Essex, a town in Essex, England
  - Grays railway station
  - Grays School
- Grays, Kent, a hamlet in Kent, England
- Rotherfield Greys or Greys, a village in Oxfordshire, England
- Grays, Washington, an unincorporated community in Washington, United States

== Sports ==
- Grays International, a UK-based sports company
- The Grays (baseball team), a Canadian-American baseball team
- Homestead Grays, Negro league baseball dynasty
- Louisville Grays, one of the original eight members of the National League
- Los Angeles Dodgers, a baseball team in California, United States
- Providence Grays, a Major League Baseball team that folded in 1885
  - Providence Grays (minor league), several minor league baseball teams between 1886 and 1949

== Other uses ==
- Gray or grey, an achromatic color
- Gray (unit), a unit of measurement of ionizing radiation
- Grey aliens or Greys, a supposed race of extraterrestrials
- Royal Scots Greys, a cavalry regiment of the British Army from 1707 to 1971
- The Grays, the Confederate States of America's armed forces
- The Grays (band), an American band

== See also ==
- Grais (disambiguation)
- Graze (disambiguation)
- Grey (disambiguation)
