= Bill Meroy Creek =

River in Essex, England

Coordinates: 51.45341°N 0.38056°E

Bill Meroy Creek is a small waterway flowing into the Thames to the east of Tilbury Fort in West Tilbury which from 1851 marked the eastern boundary of the area in which duty had to be paid on coal entering London.

== Location ==
Bill Meroy Creek is to the east of Tilbury Fort in West Tilbury (within the Thurrock unitary authority).

== Name ==
The name of Bill Meroy Creek is a corruption of the name William Millroy who was an 18th-century cattle farmer. It has also been known as Bilmaroy Creek and Billmarry Creek. It is named on some maps as Ordnance Creek. It was previously known as Pincock's Creek.

== Coal Duty ==
Coal sold in the City of London had been taxed since medieval times. With the coming of the canals and railways, the area in which duty was payable was extended and Bill Meroy Creek defined the eastern end of this area on the north bank of the Thames. To avoid paying this tax, wharfs were established at a number of places just outside the limits including what came to be known as Coalhouse point.

== 1953 Floods ==
It was through a breach in the sea wall at Bill Meroy Creek that the flood waters inundated Tilbury Town in 1953.

== Notes ==
Next confluence upstream	River Thames	Next confluence downstream
River Darent (south)	Bill Meroy Creek	River Medway (south)
