= List of Le Roman de Silence characters =

This page lists all of the characters in the 13th-century Old French Le Roman de Silence by Heldris de Cornuälle. It contains summaries for both major and minor characters as well as an indication of where they are found (for minor characters, especially those without proper names).

== Characters ==
Name	Role	Appearance(s) in Roman de Silence (lines)	Ref(s)
Narrator	Persona who shares a name with the author, relates the events of the story as well as his opinions on them	esp. 1-106, 255-276, 1550-1576, 1651-1669, 3901-3924, 4199-4220, 5228-5241, 6692-6706	
King Evan	He was the king of England and husband to Eufeme. He allows Silence to her inheritance even though she is a woman.	107-383,4417-4530, 5747-5855, 6341-6357, 6413-6432, 6525-6668	
King Begon	King of Norway and father of "the beautiful gem" Eufeme. Goes to war with King Evan but cannot win, so to make peace he offers his daughter to the king. Seeing that King Evan is satisfied, Begon sends her away immediately along with some beasts, two archbishops, four bishops, two dukes, and four counts.	v. 145-233	
Eufeme	Daughter of King Begon of Norway and wife of King Evan. To end the long hardships of war between Begon and Evan, a marriage between King Evan and Eufeme is arranged. Queen Eufeme is the quintessential "evil queen". When first described by the narrator, she is compared to a "beautiful gem" (v. 166). All her flaws are exaggerated, which the narrator uses to convey that she is actually meant to be a caricature of everything a woman should not be, as she is opinionated and libidinous. Her outspokenness and lustful behavior ultimately end in her demise, as she is beheaded by King Evan for adultery.	v. 165-209, 228-248, 3694-3716, 3721-3781, 3791-4176, 4225-4231, 4248, 4274-4280, 5242, 5680, 5804, 6180, 6348, 6371, 6460, 6531, 6587, 6651, 6663, 6695-6697	
Cador	A valiant knight, who is named "overlord of all" (v. 1604) by Count Renald prior to the count's death. Married to Eufemie. Father to Silence. Cador is meant to represent the masculine ideal of the Middle Ages: courageous, valiant, strong, and has a beautiful wife/lover.	v. 392-395, 404-426, 473-558, 565-574, 577-592, 633-640, 679-686, 718-732, 783, 795, 825-838, 869-875, 901-905, 977-990, 1086-1154, 1199, 1251, 1265-1275,1412-1657, 4422	
Eufemie	Married to Cador. Accompanies Cador on many of his knightly adventures. Mother to Silence. Eufemie is meant to represent the feminine ideal (in contrast to Eufeme) as she is quiet, obedient, chaste, and beautiful (young and fair).	395-405, 544-574, 593-675, 714, 733-1536, 1577-1792, 1958-2085, 2142-2212, 2401-2406, 2464, 2688, 2854, 3014-3086, 3480, 3553, 3656, 6682-6683	
Love		v. 1555	
Nature	Nature refers to the truth in beings. In this case, the truth about Silence being a woman.		
Count of Chester	One of King Evan's courtiers. Offers to facilitate convincing Cador and Eufemie to marry.	1309-1339, 1390-1494	
Renald of Cornwall	Count of Cornwall, father of Eufemie, and an excellent aristocrat; his properties, for which he does homage to King Evan, go to Cador at his death, a year after Cador marries Eufemie	v. 397, 1298, 1451, 1505, 1525-1549, 1577-1634	
Archbishop	Unnamed archbishop who marries Cador and Eufemie	v. 1511	
Flattery	Personification	v. 1552	
Truth	Personification	v. 1553	
Virtue	Personification	v. 1555	
Shame	Personification, daughter of Flattery and Truth?	v. 1558-1575	
God			
Jesus			
Adam	Father of mankind, mentioned in a brief catechismic passage	v. 1703-06	
Eve	Mother of mankind, mentioned in a brief catechismic passage	v. 1704-06	
Walter	Son of the lady who later acts as Midwife/Nurse, dead in infancy	v. 1739-1742	
Silence	Born a woman but forced to live as a man in order to receive her inheritance. Throughout the story she struggles with the nature of living as a girl vs.the nature of living as a boy. She ends up returning to nature and living as a woman as well as gaining her inheritance.		
Nurture	Nurture refers to how societal, historical, and or parental influence renders a person. In this case, it's Silence living as a man.		
Midwife/Nurse	Is referred to as lady at times. Cousin of Cador. She was married to an English man who died before she gave birth to their child, Walther, who lives for only a week after his baptism. At the time she was living with Cador's aunt. They are of close parentage, which led to Cador deciding to include her in the scheme of hiding the true nature of his child. She lives in solitude with Silence with the occasional visits by the Seneschal.	v. 1731-1794, 1964-1994, 2059-2062, 2112-2120, 2160-	
Seneschal	The seneschal (given no specific name) of the land was raised along with Eufemie. He was close to Renald. He loves Eufemie and is loyal. He lives in the forest by a sea. The count and countess reach out to him to help disguise their child's sex. He pledges his service to them and builds a lodging for the nursemaid and Silence. He helps raise the child as a man.	v. 2140-2257, +	
Priest/chaplain	Baptizes Silence. Is rushed to perform the ceremony due to the lie that the child was nearly dying, which makes him/them not question why the child must keep its clothing on.	v. 2100-2115	
Clerk	He is at the service of the priest who performs the baptism for Silence. He was ordered to bring the water and salt for the ceremony.	v. 2107-2111	
Minstrels (or jongleurs)	The minstrels help Silence run away from home, as they help him disguise his identity. They teach him how to play music, and Silence quickly excels. This makes the minstrels angry because they believe Silence will steal their business, so they plot against Silence and devise a plan to kill him.		
Cross-Dressed Nun	Eupheme's lover	6530-6531	
Courtiers (various)			
King of France			
Evan's Chancellor			
Count of Blois			
Count of Nevers			
Count of Clermont			
30 Frenchmen			
Guy de Calmot			
Roger de Belmont			
Castel Landon			
Rebellious Count			
Merlin	He made the kings tower then fled to live in the woods forever, or until someone caught him. He serves as the all knowing being who foils everyone secrets, as well as comic relief. The man who can't be caught other than by a woman's trickery. It is because Silence caught Merlin that her disguise was ruined.	5987-6552	
Old Man	Advises Silence on how to catch Merlin.	5875-5975	
Innkeeper	The keeper of the inn that must turn Silence in to the count	v.3491-3540	
