= Silvestro da Marradi =

Silvestro da Marradi (died 1 October 1516) was a Dominican preacher in Tuscany. A follower and defender of Girolamo Savonarola in the years after his death, his prophetic preaching was highly critical of the ecclesiastical hierarchy. He held several offices in the Dominican order in Tuscany and he founded the convent of nuns of San Vicenzo in Prato.

== Life ==
Santa Maria del Lecceto, a contemporary drawing by Fra Bartolomeo

Silvestro was born in the 1470s in Marradi in the Tuscan Romagna. The names of his parents are unknown. He moved to Florence after their deaths, while still young. His petition to join the Dominican convent of San Marco was rejected, but he was accepted as at the hospice of Santa Maria del Lecceto. He formally professed on 4 October 1491 at San Domenico in Fiesole.

On 28 May 1502, Silvestro was appointed master of novices at San Marco. In early 1503, he became prior of San Domenico in Prato. On 24 May, the provincial chapter named him definitor. In Prato, he created a community for some nuns who had been rejected by Brigida Vangelisti, the prioress of Santa Caterina. On 24 June 1504, he became prior of Fiesole. In November 1504, the nuns he had set up in Prato became the new convent of San Vicenzo. In 1505, he was reelected definitor, but in July he was removed from office by the head of the order, Vincenzo Bandello, for reasons unknown.

Silvestro was renowned for his prophetic preaching, which he learned under Girolamo Maruffi at San Marco. According to Serafino Razzi, writing in 1572, on one occasion Silvestro was miraculously levitated above the pulpit. He was a defender of the Piagnoni and of the legacy of Girolamo Savonarola. In the controversy that erupted between Dorotea da Lanciuole and Domenica Narducci in 1506, he took the side of Domenica. In the spring of 1507, he conducted a preaching tour in the Val di Nievole. He preached at Pescia during Lent 1508 and Lent 1509. In 1510, he preached in Lucca and San Lorenzo in Florence invited him to preach the following Lent. In June 1512, he was again elected definitor in a chapter held in Santa Caterina in Pisa.

In 1513, Silvestor preached in Florence. On 26 October 1514, he was named prior of San Domenico in Pescia. He was still prior there when he died of plague on 1 October 1516, either in Pescia or in Pisa.

== Works ==
Silvestro's preaching made him one of the most revered leaders in the Savonarolan movement. His Sermoni e prediche, 27 of his 1508–1509 Lenten sermons recorded by the nuns of San Michele in Pescia, are preserved in a manuscript kept in Florence. Apocalyptic in tone, they are highly critical of the secular clergy, who are blamed for killing Savonarola, and emphasise the need for wide-ranging reforms. He encourages his listeners to revel in the pejorative labels, like piagnione, that their opponents use for them. Several letter he wrote to the nuns of San Michele also survive in the same manuscript.

On 30 May 1505, Silvestro delivered a prophecy received in a vision and which is recorded in several manuscripts as the Prophetia viri cuiusdam sancti fratris Silvestri. In his vision, Silvestro was told by "Angels in the fire" of a coming schism, a popular rising with much bloodshed, and "tumult in the city, tumult outside the city, tumult in the piazza, tumult in the palace, tumult for forty hours, tumult for eleven hours, tumult for twenty-four hours."

In 1516, the Narrazione d'alcune Vite di frati indiani was compiled on Silvestro's orders. This work consists of accounts of seven Ethiopian saints given by two Ethiopia pilgrims during a stay in Santa Caterina at Pisa. The final redaction of the work was not made until after Silvestro's death.

A manuscript copy of a treatise entitled Speculum veri et humilis praedicatoris revelatum opusculum attributed to Silvestro once existed in Florence, although its whereabouts are currently unknown. It may have been an ars praedicandi, a treatise on the art of preaching.

== Sources ==
- Caplan, Harry (1934). Mediaeval Artes Praedicandi: A Hand-List. Cornell University Press.
- Caravale, Giorgio (2018). "Silvestro da Marradi". Dizionario Biografico degli Italiani (in Italian). Vol. 92: Semino–Sisto IV. Rome: Istituto dell'Enciclopedia Italiana. ISBN 978-88-12-00032-6.
- Kelly, Samantha (2024). Translating Faith: Ethiopian Pilgrims in Renaissance Rome. Harvard University Press.
- Polizzotto, Lorenzo (1994). The Elect Nation: The Savonarolan Movement in Florence 1494–1545. Clarendon Press.
- Weinstein, Donald (1970). Savonarola and Florence: Prophecy and Patriotism in the Renaissance. Princeton University Press.
