= Grais =

Grais may refer to:

- Grais (butterfly), a genus of butterflies
- Le Grais, a commune in France
- Folle blanche, also known as grais, a grape variety
- Grais, a surname; notable people with the name include:
  - Michael Grais, American screenwriter

== See also ==
- Grays (disambiguation)
