= Margaret Hayes Grazier =

American librarian (1916–1999)

- Born: Margaret Hayes; December 19, 1916; Denver, Colorado, U.S.
- Died: July 9, 1999 (aged 82); Detroit, Michigan, U.S.
- Education: University of Northern Colorado, University of Denver, University of Chicago
- Occupations: Professor, librarian
- Employer(s): University of Chicago, Wayne State University
- Known for: School libraries
- Spouse: Robert Grazier

Margaret Hayes Grazier (December 19, 1916 – July 9, 1999) was an American librarian, educator, and published author in the field of Library and Information science, who specialized in school librarianship. She worked as a school librarian at various high schools and, later in her career, as a professor of library science at Wayne State University. Grazier had developed a model to guide library media specialists to become fully immersed in the entire cycle of the student's learning process, everything from storytelling to planning and evaluating curriculum. She was active in several important library organizations, including the American Library Association, and received awards for her contributions to her field of study.

== Biography ==
Margaret Hayes Grazier was born an only child to parents Warren Chauncey Hayes and Rosetta Ernestine (Bankwitz) Hayes on December 19, 1916, in Denver, Colorado. Grazier's main area of expertise was in school librarianship and she worked in this arena in Colorado, Illinois and Michigan. She met librarian Robert Grazier (her eventual husband) during her years at the University of Chicago. They married on July 27, 1956, after they both had relocated to Michigan. Grazier had one stepson, Michael, from her husband's previous relationship. The two were married for 42 years, until Grazier died of cancer in Detroit, Michigan, on July 9, 1999. She was 82 years old.

== Early career ==
Grazier's career began in her home state of Colorado where she obtained her B.A. degree from the University of Northern Colorado in 1937. She continued on with her education the following year earning a Diploma in Library Science from the University of Denver (1938) followed by completing her M.A. degree in education from the University of Northern Colorado in 1941. While she was working on her master's degree, and for a year after she finished (from 1939 to 1942), Grazier also worked as the librarian and supervisor of school libraries in Greeley, Colorado. After leaving Greeley in 1942, Grazier moved to Illinois where she became the high school librarian for Lake Forest High School where she remained until 1945. She then took a position at the W.K. Kellogg Foundation in Battle Creek, Michigan, as a temporary library consultant, until she eventually ended back up at the University of Denver in 1946. There she worked as an administrator and reference librarian in the Public Services Division at the university until 1948 when she became an assistant professor there.

In 1952 she moved, this time to further her education at the University of Chicago. There she began her Ph.D. work at their Graduate Library School. Grazier never completed her doctoral studies at the university but she did work her way up from a visiting lecturer to an assistant professor at the University of Chicago.

== Mid to late career ==
Grazier left the University of Chicago in 1956, and relocated to Birmingham, Michigan, where she took on the role of head librarian at Derby High School. There she stayed until 1961 when she moved to the position of head librarian at Groves High School. Public high school librarianship was not the only thing that Grazier was doing with her career during this time period though; She was also a visiting instructor for the University of Michigan's Library Science program during the summers.

Grazier is known in the library field for her work in expanding the role of school library media specialist. In the 1960s the librarian's traditional role was that of a storyteller and provider of space for students to read recreationally. Her practice and writings led her to branch out to becoming directly involved in the instruction, to be embedded in the classroom and to collaborate with schoolteachers in developing their curriculum. So that in the 1970s, the role evolved into that of collaborator and teacher of library skills which included the assessment of research sources.

In 1965, Grazier made a career move, becoming a member of the Wayne State University faculty as an associate professor and eventually was promoted to a full time professor in 1972. In this role she was able to apply her knowledge of school libraries, specifically in the area of school librarian leadership in the library curriculum and its vital role in the learning process. In both her teaching and in the articles that she published, there is a strong recurring theme, and that is the importance that she places on the role of the school librarian. She believed that school librarians should really understand and execute both the 'theory of the curriculum and also the instructional technology'. Grazier worked as a professor at Wayne State University until she retired in 1983.

After Grazier's death in 1999, her husband created a scholarship in her name, The Margaret Hayes Grazier Endowed Scholarship Fund, at the school in which she spent the largest portion of her career, Wayne State University. The scholarship is presented yearly to students in the Library and Information Science Program who meet academic, character and leadership qualifications, in addition to financial need. They must also be pursuing a career in Grazier's specialty of school library media or youth services.

== Extra-curricular activities ==
In addition to being a professor in the Library Science Program and Wayne State University she was also very active in many library organizations.

American Library Association (ALA). During two separate phases in her life, from 1960 to 1964 and from 1972 to 1974, she was a councilor to the ALA in addition to serving as a member of the ALA's Committee on Research from 1970 to 1976.

She was an active member of the American Association of School Librarians; Considering her deep passion and roots in school libraries this is not surprising. She reigned as the second vice-president from 1970 to 1971 and served as the unit head of the AASL's Media Program Development Unit for three years from 1973 to 1976.

Although Grazier devoted much of her time to the ALA and the AASL in addition to many other library and media centric organizations, the group that she was most active in during her career was Michigan Association for Media in Education (MAME). Grazier served as the president of MAME in 1981. This was an exceptionally difficult year to hold this position because of the diminishing state funding for education. School library positions were being eliminated and there were severe University of Michigan budget cuts. The troubling financial times that surrounded her presidency forced her to focus mainly on coming up with funding solutions for jobs and services at the state level that she believed to be a vital part of the learning process. After her term as president, Grazier became the editor of MAME's journal, Media Spectrum, and remained the editor of the journal until 1988.

== Awards ==
Grazier was a recipient of the AASL President's Award in 1986. According to the AASL this award is presented to a candidate who exemplifies "outstanding contributions to school librarianship and school library media development".

For her continued work with the MAME organization she too was recognized with MAME's Outstanding Meritorious Service Award in 1987. After Grazier's death, another MAME award, for contributions to the profession, was renamed in her honor as "The Margaret Grazier Award for Contributions to the Profession".

Her most recent honor was bestowed upon her by the Women's National Book Association's Detroit Chapter, in 1998. This group named her their Bookwoman of the Year.

After Grazier's death in 1999, she was chosen as number 41 in the American Libraries' list of "100 of the Most Important Leaders We Had in the 20th Century". She is included in the list with the likes of Melvil Dewey and Andrew Carnegie amongst others.

== Grazier's publications ==
- "Implications of the New Educational Goals for School Libraries on the Secondary Level". Library Quarterly 30 [January 1960]: 38.
- "Beginning with Assignments". ALA Bulletin 57(2) [February 1963]: pp. 154–55.
- "What Happens in the School Library". ALA Bulletin 58(2) [February 1964]: pp. 104–108.
- The High School Library in Transition. Chicago: Knapp School Libraries Project, 1967.
- "Preparation of the School Librarian", Education for Librarianship: The Design of the Curriculum of Library Schools, Herbert Goldhor, ed., pp 130–145. Ubrbana, Illinois: University of Illinois, 1971.
- "The Elementary and Secondary Education Act, Title II". Library Trends 24 [July 1975]: pp. 45–62.
- "A Role for Media Specialists in the Curriculum Development Process". School Library Media Quarterly 4 [Spring 1976]: pp. 199–204.
- "The Curriculum Consultant Roles of the School Library Media Specialist". Library Trends 28 [Fall 1979]: pp. 263–279.
- "Critically Reading and Applying Research in School Library Media Centers". School Library Media Quarterly 10 [Winter 1982]: pp. 135–46.
