= Gerald Graze =

Gerald Graze was the brother of Stanley Graze. Both were employed by the United States Department of State during World War II. In 1944, Katherine Perlo, the ex-wife of Soviet spy Victor Perlo, named Gerald Graze as a member of the Communist Party USA (CPUSA) was employed in government. Gerald Graze was also listed in the Lee Report of Department of State security risks compiled in about 1947 by Robert Lee. The "Lee List" may have been Sen. Joseph McCarthy’s list in 1950 of Communists in the State Department. Both Gerald and Stanley Graze are identified in the 1948 Gorsky Memo of Compromised American sources and networks having a covert relationship with Soviet intelligence.

Despite the vastly documented surveillance efforts of the FBI, Gerald Graze was never directly accused or tried for espionage by the U.S. Government.
