= Gianfrancesco =

Gianfrancesco is a given name. Notable people with the name include:

- Gianfrancesco Guarnieri (1934–2006), Italian–Brazilian actor, lyricist, poet, and playwright
- Gianfrancesco Penni (1488/1496–1528), Italian painter
- Gian Francesco Poggio Bracciolini (1380–1459), Italian scholar

== See also ==
- Gianfranco
