= Pastoral (disambiguation) =

A pastoral (also pastorale) is a work in the genre of literature, art, and music known as the pastoral genre, that depicts the simple life of a shepherd in an idealised manner.

Pastoral may also refer to:

== Animal husbandry ==
- Pastoral farming, the branch of agriculture concerned with the raising of livestock
- Pastoralism, a form of animal husbandry where livestock are released onto large vegetated outdoor lands (pastures) for grazing, historically by nomadic people

== Arts and entertainment ==
- Pastoral (theatre of Soule), a traditional kind of play from the Basque Country
- Pastoral: To Die in the Country, a 1974 Japanese film

=== Music ===
- English Pastoral School, a group of English composers of classical music
- Pastoral, Beethoven's 6th Symphony
- Pastoral, Beethoven's Piano Sonata No. 15
- Pastoral, a song by The Jesus Lizard from the 1990 album Head
- Pastoral (album), album by Gazelle Twin, 2018

=== Literature ===
- Pastoral, a 2000 poetry collection by Carl Phillips
- Pastoral, novel by André Alexis
- Pastoral, novel by Nevil Shute

== Religion ==
- Pastoral, of or relating to a pastor, an ordained leader of a Christian congregation
- Pastoral letter, or pastoral, an open letter by a bishop to the clergy or laity of a diocese
- Pastoral care, an ancient model of emotional and spiritual support

== See also ==
- Pastoral Symphony (disambiguation)
- Pastorale (disambiguation)
- Pastoralia (disambiguation)
- Pastourelle, a typically Old French lyric form
