= Thomas Tuscus =

Thomas Tuscus or Thomas of Pavia (c. 1212 – c. 1282) was a Franciscan friar and historian. Between 1279 and 1285 he wrote the Gesta imperatorum et pontificum ("Deeds of the Emperors and Popes"), a history of the Roman Empire and Holy Roman Empire from the reign of Augustus down to 1279.

In his work, Thomas claims to have travelled widely in Europe. In 1245, he was in the company of Saint Bonaventure at the Council of Lyon.

Thomas's main sources are Martin of Opava and Vincent of Beauvais, but he adds much original material, most of it legendary. His account of the reign of Frederick Barbarossa is littered with popular anecdotes. In general, he expresses Guelph sympathies: hostility to the Staufer and partisanship for the Angevins.

== Editions ==
- Ehrenfeuchter, Ernst. (ed.) Thomae Tusci, Gesta imperatorum et pontificum. Monumenta Germaniae Historica, Scriptores, 22 (1872): 483–528.
