= Grazer (surname) =

Grazer is a German surname. Notable people with the surname include:

- Brian Grazer (born 1951), American Oscar-winning film and television producer
- Gigi Levangie Grazer (born 1963), American novelist and screenwriter
- Jack Dylan Grazer (born 2003), American child actor
