= Thomas of Todi =

Start of the Ars sermocinandi in a manuscript from 1399

Thomas of Todi (Latin: Thomas de Tuderto) was an Italian Austin friar and master of sacred theology active around 1380.

Thomas's Ars sermocinandi ac collationes faciendi (Art of Sermonizing), a Latin treatise on the technical art of preaching, is one of the longest texts in its genre. It was also widely copied, being preserved in at least 20 manuscripts, although in one it is incomplete and in another two it is anonymous. The work is dedicated to several learned lords. It is divided into seven chapters on:

1. division of the thema
2. subdivision
3. proof of the parts (probatio), of which there are five typse:
  1. by authority
  2. by symbolism
  3. by reason
  4. by examples
  5. by history
4. elaboration of the parts (prolixitas and multiplicatio), of which there are seven modes
5. order of the sermon (ordinatio), which consists of eight parts:
  1. proposing the thema (thematis propositio)
  2. reciting the Ave Maria (Virginis salutatio)
  3. introducing the thema (thematis introductio)
  4. dividing the thema (thematis divisio)
  5. subdividing the divisions (divisionum subdivisio)
  6. proving the divisions and subdivisions (divisionum et subdivisionum probatio)
  7. rhythorum ordinatio
  8. conclusion (sermonis conclusio)
6. introduction of the thema
7. rhymes, for which there are five rules

Siegfried Wenzel notes that the chapters are not ordered logically. The fifth and sixth should be the first two. Unlike most theorists, who considered division of the thema into three to be best, Thomas considered division into four best. His emphasis on rhyme and rhythm is also unique.

The text of the Ars sermocinandi was transcribed by June Babcock based on a single manuscript (Paris, Bibliothèque nationale de France, Latin 15965) for her 1941 thesis, which has never been published.

== Bibliography ==
- Babcock, June (1941). Ars sermocinandi ac etiam collationes faciendi of Thomas of Todi, MS Paris, Bibl. Nat. 15965 (MA thesis). Cornell University.
- Charland, Thomas-Marie (1936). Artes praedicandi: contribution à l'histoire de la rhétorique au Moyen Âge. Institut d'Études Médiévales.
- Murphy, James J. (1974). Rhetoric in the Middle Ages: A History of Rhetorical Theory from Saint Augustine to the Renaissance. University of California Press.
- Wenzel, Siegfried (2015). Medieval 'Artes Praedicandi': A Synthesis of Scholastic Sermon Structure. University of Toronto Press.
