= Simon Alcock =

English writer

Simon Alcock (died 1459?) was an English scholastic writer.

== Biography ==
Alcock was educated at the University of Oxford, where he took the degrees of M.A. and D.D. Before 1422 he was presented to the living of West Tilbury in Essex, which he resigned in 1428 for that of Lamarsh in the same county. A prebend in Hereford Cathedral was apparently conferred on Alcock on 25 August 1436; it seems probable that he subsequently became Canon of Lincoln Cathedral, and was buried there on 10 August 1459. Alcock apparently maintained throughout his life his connection with Oxford, and he is still numbered among the benefactors of the libraries of Oriel and Magdalen Colleges.

== Works ==
Alcock's works were never printed. According to John Bale, following John Leland, they included commentaries on Peter Lombard's Liber Sententiarum, entitled Expositiones in Sententias Longobardi, and many sermons. This is now doubted.

Alcock was author of a Tractatus de modo dividendi thema pro materia sermonis dilatanda, which is preserved among the Harleian MSS., and of a Libellus de arte dictaminis, preserved among the manuscripts of St John's College, Oxford, the colophon of which states it to have been prepared as a lecture "a magistro Symone Alkoke, doctore in theologia, anno Domini Mo cccco 27". Another work in manuscript at St John's College, Oxford, entitled Libellus de arte scribendi epistolas, has also been ascribed to Alcock.
