= Neslihan Şenocak =

Turkish historian (born 1976)

- Born: c. 1976; İzmir, Turkey
- Citizenship: Turkish
- Education: Middle East Technical University (BS); Bilkent University (MA, PhD)
- Scientific career
- Fields: Medieval History
- Workplaces: Bilkent University; Columbia University; Eastern Mediterranean University; University of Notre Dame; University of Toronto
- Doctoral advisor: Paul Latimer

Neslihan Şenocak (born in İzmir, c. 1976) is a Turkish historian and instructor at Bilkent University in Ankara and at Columbia University in New York City.

== Career ==
Her work examines medieval religious orders and the daily life in the thirteenth-century Italy, and her most recent project is on the relationship of violent crimes and urbanization in 13th-century Perugia.

She is the author of several articles, as well as numerous book reviews. These works have been cited about 90 times in the academic literature.

== Selected works ==
=== Articles ===
- "Circulation of Books in the Medieval Franciscan Order: Attitude, Methods, and Critics" in the Journal of Religious History, 2004,
- "Book Acquisition in the Medieval Franciscan Order", Journal of Religious History, 2003,
- "The Franciscan Order and Natural Philosophy in the Thirteenth Century: A Relationship Redefined" in Journal for the Study of Religion, Nature and Culture, (Ecotheology 7.2) January 2003,
- "Early Fourteenth-Century Franciscan Library Catalogues" in Scriptorium, Vol. 59, Nº. 1, 2005, pags. 29-50,
