= Martín Alonso de Córdoba =

Martín Alonso de Córdoba (died 5 July 1476) was a Spanish Augustinian friar, professor of theology, preacher and writer. In 1468–1469, he was a tutor to the future queen Isabella I of Castile. Thirteen works are attributed to him.

== Life ==
Martín was born around 1400 in Córdoba and entered the local Augustinian convent. With the permission of the prior general of the order, Agostino Favaroni, he went to the convent in Salamanca to read the Sentences in 1420. In 1424, Favaroni permitted him to study at the University of Zaragoza while continuing to lecture at Salamanca. Gregory of Rimini granted him his Bachelor of Theology degree in 1431 while permitting him to take his Master of Theology at the University of Toulouse, where he graduated in 1436 and subsequently taught.

From 1443 to 1451, Martín was the vicar general of the Observants at Salamanca, seeing through the reform of the convent along Observant lines in 1448. He left the school at Salamanca intact, but Pope Nicholas V suppressed it in 1451 as being incompatible with the religious life. Martín then joined the faculty of theology and philosophy at the University of Salamanca, which awarded him a doctorate. In 1461, the prior general, Guglielmo Becchi, transferred him to Toulouse to teach theology.

Martín regularly preached at the court of King Henry IV of Castile. In 1462, he was nominated for the vacant diocese of Badajoz, but he declined. He presided over the provincial chapters of Castile in 1465, 1468, 1471 and 1473. Queen Isabella entrusted to him the education of her son, Alfonso, Prince of Asturias, and, after his death in 1468, that of her daughter, the future queen Isabella I.

In 1470, the prior general Giacomo Oliva appointed Martín as vicar general of the convent of Valladolid, a post in which he continued until his death on 5 July 1476. He was buried in Valladolid.

== Works ==
=== Published works ===
Frontispiece of the 1542 edition of Jardín de nobles doncellas

Five of Martín's works have been edited:

- Compendio de la fortuna
- Jardín de nobles doncellas
- Tratado de la predestinación
- Ars praedicandi
- Notabilis repetitio

Compendio de la fortuna, written in Spanish, was dedicated to Álvaro de Luna between 1440 and 1453. It is divided into two books. Defining fortune as "an unexpected event intimately united to a final cause" (un suceso inopinado íntimamente unido a una causa final), Martín argues that only humans are capable of experience fortune. He takes up and defends the position of Seneca the Younger.

Jardín de nobles doncellas, or Garden of Noble Maidens, was written in Spanish in 1468–1469 with the dual purpose of instructing the princess Isabella in how to be a monarch and defending her right to the crown against the rival claims of Juana la Beltraneja. It is the rare example of a mirror for princes addressed to a woman of seventeen. It is composed of three parts with ten chapters in each. The first two parts concern the nature and characteristics of women in general. As regards a ruler, upright behaviour and the acquisition of knowledge (especially the classics) are emphasised. It ends with a catalogue of exemplary women.

Tratado de la predestinación, also in Spanish, is treatise on predestination in the tradition of Augustine of Hippo and Thomas Aquinas. For Martín, grace is unmerited, but predestination does not preclude either human agency or divine election.

Ars praedicandi is a short technical treatise (ars) on preaching in Latin, written at the end of his life. Addressed to novice preachers, it is divided into eight sections. In the first section, Martín defines a sermon as "an informative speech coming from the mouth of a preacher and instructing the faithful what to do, what to keep from, what to fear, and what to hope for." The next seven sections concern the basic structural elements of a scholastic sermon, such as the ten modes of introducing the theme, the fourteen modes of dilatation of the theme, the four senses of Scripture, etc.

Only recently published from manuscript, Notabilis repetitio is a short work on ecclesiology. It is historically valuable for its description of the configuration of power in the Spanish church of the 15th century.

=== Other works ===
At least eight other works are known:

- De prospera et adversa fortuna
- Hexaemeron, sive de operibus sex dierum
- Commentaria in Apocalypsim Sancti Joannis
- In divi Pauli 'Epistolas' commentaria et quaestionibus, a commentary on the Pauline epistles written at Toulouse
- Alabanza de la virginidad, para religiosas
- De mystica et vera theologia
- Liber diverarum historiarum
- Logica et philosophia

== Bibliography ==
- Gastañaga, José-Luis (2025). "Jardín de Nobles Doncellas (Martín de Córdoba)". In M. M. Sauer; D. Watt; L. H. McAvoy (eds.). The Palgrave Encyclopedia of Medieval Women's Writing in the Global Middle Ages. Palgrave Macmillan. doi:10.1007/978-3-030-76219-3_343-1.
- Goldberg, Harriet, ed. (1974). Jardín de nobles doncellas by Fray Martín de Córdoba: A Critical Edition and Study. North Carolina Studies in the Romance Languages and Literatures.
- Lazcano González, Rafael (2022). "Córdoba, Martín de". Diccionario Biográfico Español. Real Academia de la Historia.
- Wenzel, Siegfried (2015). Medieval 'Artes Praedicandi': A Synthesis of Scholastic Sermon Structure. University of Toronto Press.
