= Pastoralia (genre) =

Pastoralia is a genre of written practical and theoretical aids aimed at pastors, parish priests and curates that proliferated in Western Europe in the later Middle Ages. It was the product of renewed interest in pastoral care after about 1200, especially after the Fourth Lateran Council in 1215.

Pastoralia as a collective term for this new species of literature was coined by Leonard Boyle. The word may also refer to the theology underlying this literature or even to the techniques and capabilities it was meant to inculcate. In these senses, it is closely connected in meaning with the terms pastoral theology and practical theology.

The main areas of concern in the pastoralia are the sacraments, preaching, anointing of the sick and moral theology. There are many subgenres, such as "guides to hearing confession, catechisms, compendia to canon law, and manuals for parish priests". Boyle provides a diagram of subgenres. Among the named genres he identifies are:

- episcopal constitutions
- distinctiones
- artes praedicandi
- artes moriendi
- summae poenitentiae
  - summae confessorum
  - summae de casibus
  - summae confessionis
    - summae confitendi
    - confessionalia
      - canones poenitentiales

Pastoralia were written in Latin for the clergy, but for the interested laity there were vernacular works, sometimes in verse. Those works destined for a lay audience included explanations of the sacraments and of penance.

== Sources ==
- Boyle, Leonard E. (1985). "The Fourth Lateran Council and Manuals of Popular Theology". In Thomas J. Heffernan (ed.). The Popular Literature of Medieval England. University of Tennessee Press. pp. 30–43.
- Dykema, Peter A. (2000). "Handbooks for Pastors: Late Medieval Manuals for Parish Priests and Conrad Porta's Pastorale Lutheri (1582)". In Robert Bast; Andrew Colin Gow (eds.). Continuity and Change: The Harvest of Late-Medieval and Reformation History. Brill. pp. 143–162.
- Goering, Joseph (2010). "Leonard E. Boyle and the Invention of Pastoralia". In Ronald Stansbury (ed.). A Companion to Pastoral Care in the Late Middle Ages (1200–1500). Brill. pp. 7–20. doi:10.1163/ej.9789004183537.i-430.5.
- Louth, Andrew, ed. (2022). "Pastoralia". The Oxford Dictionary of the Christian Church (4th ed.). Oxford University Press.
- Reeves, Andrew (2013). "'The Cure of Souls is the Art of Arts': Preaching, Confession, and Catechesis in the Middle Ages". Religion Compass. 7 (9): 372–384. doi:10.1111/rec3.12058.
- Sibson, Carol Ann (2013). ‘Þys tale rymeth hou men in senne beþ’: A Study of Vernacular Verse Pastoralia for the English Laity, c.1240 – c.1330 (PhD dissertation). Queen Mary University of London.
- Swinton, John (2022). "Practical and pastoral theology". In Andrew Louth (ed.). The Oxford Dictionary of the Christian Church (4th ed.). Oxford University Press.
