= Alexander of Ashby =

English theologian and poet

Alexander of Ashby (Latin: Alexander Essebiensis) was a celebrated English theologian and poet, who flourished about the year 1220. Scarcely anything is known of his history, except that he appears to have been prior of Canons Ashby, in Northamptonshire. Some writers make him a native of Somersetshire; others of Staffordshire; and some have confounded him with Alexander Neckam.

He wrote various theological and historical works in prose, particularly a chronicle of England, which are still found scattered in manuscripts. His poetry, in which he sought to imitate Ovid and Ausonius, is much praised by John Bale. Amongst other poems, we may enumerate one in elegiacs, giving a description of all the saints' days throughout the year, with the lives of the saints who were celebrated on each and a metrical compendium of Bible History.

A further account of Alexander's works will be found in Thomas Tanner's Bibliotheca, and Polycarp Leyser's Hist. Poet. Med. Ævi.

== Sources ==
- Franco Morenzoni; Thomas H. Bestul, eds. (2004). Alexandri Essebiensis Opera theologica. Corpus Christianorum, continuatio mediaevalis. Turnhout: Brepols. ISBN 978-2-503-04881-9.
- Greti Dinkova-Bruun, ed. (2004). Alexandri Essebiensis Opera poetica. Corpus Christianorum, continuatio mediaevalis. Turnhout: Brepols. ISBN 978-2-503-04883-3.
- Bestul, Thomas H. (1990). "The Meditationes of Alexander of Ashby: An Edition". Mediaeval Studies. 52: 24–81. doi:10.1484/J.MS.2.306374.
- Dinkova-Bruun, Greti (1999). Alexander of Ashby's Brevissima comprehensio historiarum: A critical edition with annotation (Thesis). University of Toronto. hdl:1807/13267.
- Dinkova-Bruun, Greti (2001). "Alexander of Ashby: New Biographical Evidence". Mediaeval Studies. 63: 305–322. doi:10.1484/J.MS.2.306487. ISSN 0076-5872.
- Donavin, Georgiana (1997). ""De sermone sermonem fecimus": Alexander of Ashby's De artificioso modo predicandi". Rhetorica. 15 (3): 279–296. doi:10.1525/rh.1997.15.3.279. ISSN 0734-8584. JSTOR 10.1525/rh.1997.15.3.279.
