= Grazer =

Grazer may refer to:

- grazer, an animal that grazes
- Grazers (Christianity), a category of Christian hermits who lived naked and nourished themselves solely on plants
- Grazer, a native or inhabitant of Graz

== Astronomy ==
- Earth Grazer, Earth-grazing fireball that enters the Earth's atmosphere and leaves again
- Mercury grazer, asteroid whose orbit crosses that of Mercury

== Business ==
- Grazer Autorenversammlung, Austrian writers' association
- Grazer Gruppe, Austrian writers group
- Grazer Wechselseitige Versicherung, Central European insurance company

== Other uses ==
- Grazer (surname)
- Grazer AK, Austrian sports club
- Grazer Kunsthaus, Austrian museum
- Grazer Oper, Austrian opera house and opera company

== See also ==
- Grazer Schloßberg, Austrian hill topped by a castle
