= Domenico Benivieni =

Domenico Benivieni or Dominicus Benivenius (Florence, 1460 ca. – 1507) was an Italian religious.

== Life ==
Born in Florence, his father was Paolo Benivieni. He had two brothers, Girolamo and Antonio.

He was known for his works on logics, theology and his studies about Aristotle. He was praised by Marsilio Ficino. From 1470 to 1481 taught logics at the University of Pisa.

From 1492 he became one of the main defenders of Girolamo Savonarola and his theories. From February 16, 1498, he was forbidden to attend the sermons of Savonarola and was no longer dispensed with the participation in the choir of his church, from which he was then suspended. He died in 1507.

== Works ==
- Benivieni, Domenico (1496). Trattato in defensione della dottrina di Girolamo Savonarola (in Italian). Impresso in Firenze: Francesco Bonaccorsi, Piero Pacini.
- Benivieni, Domenico. Dialogo della verità della dottrina predicata da Savonarola (in Italian). Firenze: Bartolomeo de' Libri.
- Benivieni, Domenico (1497). Epistola responsiva alle calunnie contro Girolamo Savonarola (in Italian). Firenze: Lorenzo Morgiani.
- Benivieni, Domenico (1497). Scala della vita spirituale sopra il first di Maria (in Italian). Firenze: Bartolomeo de' Libri.
