= Pastorale (disambiguation) =

Pastorale (pastoral as genre) refers to something of a pastoral nature in music, whether in form or in mood.

Pastorale may also refer to:

== Music ==
- Pastorale (Charpentier), 8 sets, H.479, H.482, H.483, H.484, H.485, H.486, H.492, H.493
- Pastorale, a song without words by Igor Stravinsky, 1907
- Pastorale, a ballet by Georges Auric, choreography by George Balanchine, set by Pedro Pruna, Ballets Russes, 1926
- Pastorale, album by Stefano Battaglia, 2009

== Other ==
- Pastorale, a watercolour painting by Konstantin Somov, 1896
- Pastorale, a film by Otar Iosseliani, 1975

== See also ==
- Pastoral (disambiguation)
- Pastourelle, a typically Old French lyric form
