= Stanley Graze =

American economist

Stanley Graze was an economist from New York City. He graduated from and lectured at the City College of New York and had a master's degree from Columbia University. He was employed by various Wall Street firms, the State Department, and the United Nations. He was alleged to have been a Soviet spy based on a transcription of the Gorsky Memo.

Stanley was the brother of Gerald Graze, both were listed in Alexander Vassiliev's transcription of the 1948 Gorsky Memo, allegedly identified as government officials related to the Soviets. Vassiliev initiated and lost a 2004 libel case against the magazine Intelligence and National Security in the British Courts concerning related material pertaining to the Gorsky Memo from his book, "The Haunted Wood." Graze was also listed in the FBI Silvermaster File, which was compiled during the Cold War to assess Soviet presence in the US Government. The FBI placed surveillance over his interaction with Victor Perlo. It remained unclear whether the cryptonym "DAN", was in fact Graze. Graze was later cleared by an internal review board. Like many Americans at the time, he was charged due to McCarthy's "Red Scare".

While working as an officer in the Office of Strategic Services, Graze participated in intelligence missions in Europe, based out of London during World War II. Graze received an Honorable Discharge at the end of his military service.

State Department Diplomat, Deborah E. Graze, is the daughter of Gerald Graze. She has served as the Consul General in Milan, Italy.
