= Walter of Bruges =

Bishop of Poitiers; flemish franciscan (c.1227–1307)

- Born: c. 1227
- Died: 1307 (aged 79–80)

Philosophical work
- Era: Medieval philosophy
- Region: Western philosophers
- School: Augustinism; Franciscan theology
- Main interests: Epistemology theology
- Notable ideas: Henry of Ghent Peter Olivi

Walter of Bruges (Gualterus Brugensis OFM, Gualterus de Brugge, Gauthier de Bruges OM, Gualterus de Brugis, Gualterus de Brüge, Walter von Brügge) was a Franciscan theologian, who flourished at the University of Paris 1267–1269.

== Life ==
He entered the Franciscans in Bruges in about 1240 and was sent to Paris for his studies. A student of Bonaventure, he was regent master at Paris from 1267 to 1269. He was elected minister provincial of the French province in 1269, then became bishop of Poitiers in 1279, a post which he held until 1306, when he retired because of ill health. He died the following year.

His family name was probably Van den Zande. He wrote Sermones per totum annum and Excerpta ex sanctis Patribus (Augustine, Gregory, Jerome, Ambrose, Hilary, Isadore and others) but was not widely known until the publication of Quaestiones Disputatae. With Bonaventure, he was a teacher of Matthew of Aquasparta.

== Philosophy ==
As a follower of Bonaventure, Walter accepted that the existence of God is "the first truth" and therefore could not be proved a priori. The school of which he formed part differed from Thomas Aquinas, who held that God's existence can be proved a posteriori but not a priori (see Summa Theologica, I, 2, 1 and I, 2, 3), but contended that being itself was the first object of knowledge.

== Works ==
His surviving works include:

- Super libros primus, secundus et quattuor sententiarum: For MSS, see P. Glorieux, Répertoire des Maîtres en Theologie de Paris, vol. 2, pp. 84–6. Three questions from book one have been edited by E. Longpré, "Questiones inédits du commentaire sur les Sentences de Guathier de Bruges," Archives d'histoire doctrinale et littéraire du moyen age, 7 (1932): 251–75. Part of book four has been edited by P. de Mattia, Le questioni sull'Eucaristia di Gualtiero di Bruges. Rome, 1962
- Questiones disputatae Edited by E. Longpré, Questiones disputatae du B. Gauthier de Bruges. Les Philosophes Belges, Textes et études, 10. Louvain, 1928.
- Instructiones circa divinum officium: Edited M. DePoorter, Un traité de théologie inédit de Gauthier de Bruges: Instructiones circa divinum officium. Sociétié d'émulation de Bruges. Mélanges 5. Bruges, 1911 vol. 12.
- Tabula originalium: Unedited, for MSS see Glorieux, Répertoire, vol. 2, pp. 84–6
- Sermones: See Schneyer, 2 (1970): 103-9
- Lectura super Peryermenias, Commentarium in librum Perihermenias

== Sources ==
- Eardley, P. S., "The Foundations of Freedom in Later Medieval Philosophy: Giles of Rome and his Contemporaries", Journal of the History of Philosophy - Volume 44, Number 3, July 2006, pp. 353–376
- M. J. Grajewski, "Walter of Bruges," New Catholic Encyclopedia 14: 786-7
- F. L. R. Sassen. "Walter von Brügge," Lexicon für Theologie und Kirche, 10 (1965): 947
- Anscar Zawart, The History of Franciscan Preaching and of Franciscan Preachers (1209-1927): A Bio-bibliographical Study, J. F. Wagner, 1928
