= Julian N. Wasserman =

American scholar

Julian Noa Wasserman (June 8, 1948 – June 4, 2003) was an American scholar of English specializing in medieval English literature, including Pearl, Sir Gawain and the Green Knight, and the works of Geoffrey Chaucer.

== Education and career ==
After graduating from Vanderbilt University and earning a master's degree at Southern Methodist University, Wasserman completed his Ph.D. at Rice University. He taught at University of Houston–Clear Lake, the University of St. Thomas in Minnesota, the University of Arkansas at Little Rock, and Rice University, before joining Loyola University, New Orleans, in 1985. He was named as provost distinguished professor in 2000, He held this title until his death in 2003.

He died on June 4, 2003, from complications of myelodysplastic syndrome, a form of bone cancer.

== Books ==
Wasserman's books included:

- Chaucer in the Eighties (edited with Robert J. Blanch, Suracuse University Press, 1986)
- Sign, Sentence, Discourse: Language in Medieval Thought and Literature (edited with Lois Roney, Suracuse University Press, 1989)
- Text and Matter: New Critical Perspectives of the Pearl-Poet (edited with Robert J. Blanch and Miriam Youngerman Miller, Whitson, 1991)
- From Pearl to Gawain. Forme to Fynisment (with Robert J. Blanch, University Press of Florida, 1995)
