= The Form of Preaching =

The Form of Preaching is a 14th-century style book or manual about a preaching style known as the "thematic sermon", or "university-style sermon", by Robert of Basevorn. Basevorn's text was not the first book about this topic to appear but was popular because it is very thorough.

== Author ==
Little is known about its author Robert of Basevorn, and what little is known about him has been extracted from his lone work. This includes Basevorn's own name, which he hints at in writing that "Should any one wish to know who and of what status is that friend to whom this work is dedicated, and who I am and what is my status - I write all this from beginning to end - let him look at the capital letters and he will learn" (p. 111). Combining the first letter from each of the book's chapters spells Domino Willelmo abbati de Basingweek Robertus de Basevorn which translates to: To Lord William, Abbot of Basingwerk, [from] Robert of Basevorn. A known manuscript of the text is dated 1322, and beyond this, there is no other knowledge about Basevorn.

Basevorn wrote The Form of Preaching in response to a large number of impostors who were posing as preachers and representatives of the church but who were not granted the authority to do so. His text makes the qualifications of what is necessary to be a preacher, and provides a manual-style instruction on the rhetorical and stylistic skills one must have to excel at preaching. His importance is in the historical study of rhetoric, particularly 14th Century rhetoric, because The Form of Preaching is the text that best encapsulates the thematic sermon, a preaching style that developed in the early 14th century, and continues to be used today.

== Subject matter ==
The preaching style first appeared in 1230–1231, at the University of Paris. The format of a university-style sermon takes a single theme from scripture and continuously develops the theme over the course of the sermon. A thematic sermon consists of six parts which are as follows:

- The theme, which is taken from a passage of scripture
- The protheme', the introduction of the theme, which is followed by prayer
- The antetheme', an explanation of the sermon's purpose
- The division of the theme into sub-themes
- Further subdivision of the sub-themes
- Analysis of the divisions and subdivisions

== Opening remarks ==
The Form of Preaching can be divided into three sections. The first section deals with Basevorn's introductory remarks. This include his intentions for writing the text as a teaching manual. Basevorn considers preaching an art, so there are aesthetic characteristics to preaching in addition to having a wide knowledge of Christianity. The introduction also includes his criteria for one to be given the title of preacher. They are, first, that one must live a moral and just Christian life. Second, one must have adequate knowledge of sacred texts, including the Bible, Ten Commandments, and scripture. Third, one must be given the authority of the church (from a bishop or Pope) to practice as a preacher. He makes clear, however, regardless of how well schooled and knowledgeable a woman is about Christianity, she cannot preach.

== Sources of good preaching ==
Basevorn says there is no one good style of preaching to emulate, but cites five sources that cover the spectrum of effective preaching styles. He argues that emulation or imitation is an acceptable practice because there is no shame in mimicking what has already been proved effective, and that too much emphasis is put on trying to be original. His five sources are Jesus, Saint Paul, Saint Augustine, Saint Gregory and Saint Bernard, probably Bernard of Clairvaux.

Jesus’ methods receive the most attention because, to Basevorn, Jesus "included all praiseworthy methods in His own, as the fount and origin of good" (p. 128). Basevorn highlights six styles that trace specifically to Jesus: promising salvation (it is effective to use when people need little convincing), threats of damnation (it is effective to use on the stubborn), preaching by example (citing examples of a good Christian life), preaching by reason or logic, speaking clearly, and speaking obscurely. Basevorn provides little explanation for the latter two styles. He cites the passage “Behold, now thou speakest plainly, and speakest no proverb” from John 16:29 for the style of speaking clearly; for the style of speaking obscurely, he writes "it is frequently said about His hearers that they did not understand the Word". (p. 129)

Saint Paul's method combines reason and authority into one method in which they work in tandem. In Saint Paul's style authority confirms reason. Saint Paul, as well, appeals to Basevorn because his writings and sermons reflect his compassion and charity he had for his audience.

Closely reading a single passage from a sacred text and developing a sermon from a single theme in that specific passage is Saint Augustine's style, and appeals to Basevorn because it is a type of thematic sermon. The merit in Saint Augustine's style, according to Basevorn, is it is best suited for people with short memories or attention spans.

Morality, not faith, is the point of emphasis in Saint Gregory's sermons. Basevorn appreciates Saint Gregory's style because he provides tangible examples of morality and the merits of Christianity in practical terms. He of Basevorn's five sources is the lone one to do so.

Lastly, Saint Bernard's style stands out to Basevorn because he frequently cites from primary sources, so that a more authoritative source confirms what he says in a sermon.

== Ornamentation of a sermon ==
The Form of Preaching’s third focus is the ways in which a sermon can be ornamented. Ornamentation includes aesthetic techniques but also formal characteristics that comprise a sermon's structure. In all, Basevorn cites twenty-two ornaments. The list of ornaments can be divided into two main categories: ornaments that are intrinsic to a sermon's content, and ornaments that deal with the presentation of the sermon. The first fifteen ornaments are intrinsic to a sermon, and the list of intrinsic ornaments is as follows:

- Invention of the theme
- Winning-over of the audience
- Prayer
- Introduction
- Division
- Statement of the parts
- Proof of the parts
- Amplification
- Digression (or transition)
- Correspondence
- Agreement of correspondence
- Circuitous development
- Convolution
- Unification
- Conclusion (p. 132).

While the intrinsic ornaments deal with the composition and structure of a sermon, the extrinsic ornaments are:

- Coloration
- Modulation of voice
- Appropriate gesture
- Timely humour
- Allusion
- Firm impression
- Weighing of subject matter (p. 132).

These ornaments are presentational and are a means for delivering an effective sermon.

== Sources ==
- James J., Murphy. “Introduction.” Three Medieval Rhetorical Arts. Ed. James J. Murphy. Berkeley:University of California Press, 1971. xii-xxiii.
- Basevorn, Robert of. The Form of Preaching. Trans. Leopold Krul O.S.B. Three Medieval Rhetorical Arts. Ed. James J. Murphy. Berkeley: University of California Press, pp. 111–215.
