= Thomas Waleys =

Thomas Waleys was a Dominican master of theology at Oxford University who delivered a noted sermon in 1333, during the beatific vision controversy. The sermon brought him into conflict with ecclesiastical authorities in Avignon. His idea that saints and purified souls would see God (i.e. attain beatific vision) immediately after death was at odds with the position of Pope John XXII, who contended that God's essence would be revealed only after the Last Judgment.

Waleys was eventually freed from the pontifical prison and permitted to return to England.

In the first half of the 14th century Waleys wrote a tract which differentiated sermon style between the ancient manner of preaching and a newer style. The old manner employed by the Church Fathers and the saints was still preached in Italy and some other places. The modern sermon, however, was more commonly heard. The modus antiquus was made up of a verse-by-verse commentary on the Gospel reading of the day while the modern sermon had its foundation on an individual selected thema.

== Works ==
- De divinis moribus. Cologne, 1472 digital
