= The Oxford Dictionary of the Middle Ages =

Oxford reference work on the Middle Ages

Oxford Dictionary of the Middle Ages
- Four-volume set
- Author: Robert E. Bjork (ed.)
- Language: English
- Subject: Middle Ages
- Genre: Reference work
- Publisher: Oxford University Press
- Publication date: 2010
- Pages: 1,968
- ISBN: 9780198662624
- OCLC: 635943816

The Oxford Dictionary of the Middle Ages (ODMA) is a four-volume dictionary of the Middle Ages published by Oxford University Press. It contains over 5,000 entries concerning European history and culture from AD 500 to 1500 as well as topics related to the Byzantine Empire, Islamic history, and medieval Asia. Subjects covered in the dictionary include art, architecture, medicine, law, archaeology, ecclesiastical history, languages, and literature of the medieval world. The work is preceded by The Oxford Dictionary of Late Antiquity, which covers the years AD 250 to 750.
