= Craig Warner =

American dramatist

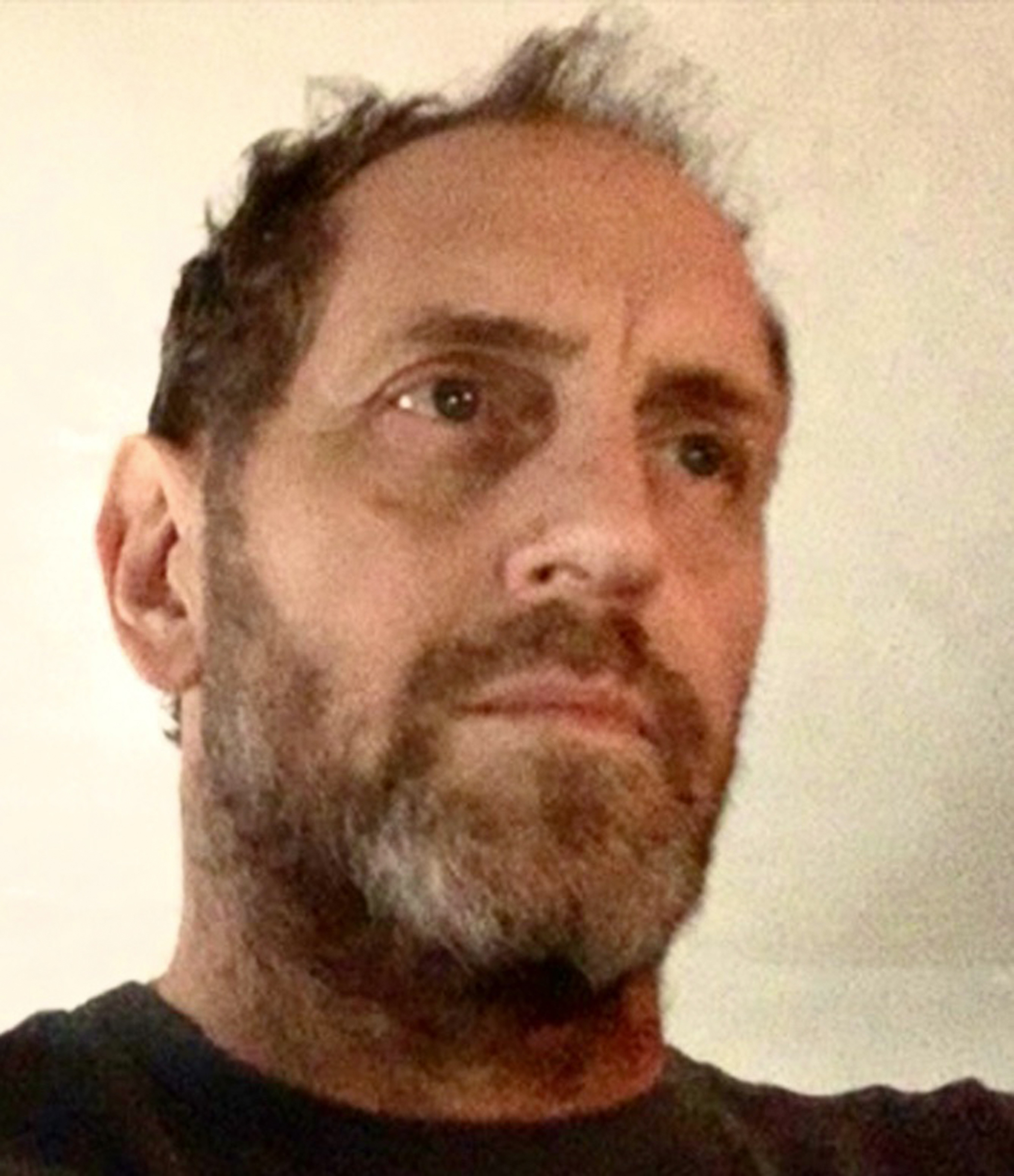
Craig Warner

Craig Warner (1964–2026) was a US-born, BAFTA-nominated playwright, screenwriter, and composer. Warner's play Strangers on a Train, based on the novel by Patricia Highsmith, ran in London's West End in 2013–14.

== Early life and education ==
Craig Warner was born in Hollywood, Los Angeles in 1964.

After attending high school in LA, he moved to New York City and then London.

Warner received a BA in philosophy from King's College London and an MA in creative writing from the University of East Anglia.

== Career ==
Warner started out writing for the theatre and for radio. His first radio play for BBC Radio 4, Great Men of Music, was performed by Philip Davis and was included in Radio 4's first Young Playwrights Festival. His second play By Where the Old Shed Used to Be, with Miranda Richardson, won the Giles Cooper Award for Best Radio Plays of the Year. His play Figure With Meat also won a Giles Cooper Award. Warner was the award's youngest-ever winner, having received it for the first time when he was 24.

He was also a composer, and wrote music and songs for a number of his works, including a full-length musical for BBC Radio 3 about the legend of Cassandra, called Agonies Awakening. He ran the production company 25th Image, for which he produced and directed the podcast comedy-drama Night Games, also playing a leading role alongside Michael Maloney.

Warner's play Strangers on a Train, based on the novel by Patricia Highsmith, ran in London's West End in 2013–14, and starred Jack Huston, Laurence Fox, Miranda Raison, Imogen Stubbs, Christian McKay, and MyAnna Buring. It was directed by Robert Allan Ackerman and produced by Barbara Broccoli.

He wrote The Queen's Sister for Channel 4, which was nominated for several BAFTA awards (including Best Single Drama), Maxwell for BBC2, which garnered a Broadcasting Press Guild Award nomination for Best Single Drama and won David Suchet an International Emmy for Best Actor, and The Last Days of Lehman Brothers, for which Warner was longlisted for a BAFTA Craft Award for Best Writer, and which won him the award for Best Writer at the Seoul International Drama Awards in 2010.

He wrote the mini-series Julius Caesar for Warner Bros., which gained Warner a Writers Guild Award nomination for Best Original Long-Form Drama, and he performed an extensive uncredited rewrite on The Mists of Avalon, also for Warner Bros., which was nominated for a Writers Guild Award and nine Emmys, including Best Mini-series. Warner wrote the screenplay for Codebreaker, a film about Alan Turing.

== Personal life and death ==
Warner lived and worked in Suffolk, England. He died in Suffolk in 2026.

== Awards ==
- 2012: Winner – Best Production, EuroPAWS Science TV Audience Award, Codebreaker
- 2010: Winner – Best Writer, Seoul International Drama Awards, The Last Days of Lehman Brothers
- 2008: Nominated – Broadcasting Press Guild Awards, Best Single Drama, Maxwell
- 2006: Nominated – BAFTA TV Award, Best Single Drama, The Queen's Sister
- 2004: Nominated – Writers Guild of America, WGA Award (TV), Best Original Long-Form Drama, Julius Caesar
- 1998: Nominated – Verity Bargate Award, Soho Theatre, Dark Leaves
- 1997: Nominated – Vivian Ellis Prize, Kings Head Theatre, Agonies Awakening
- 1992: Nominated – European Broadcast Union Award, High Flyer
- 1991: Winner – BBC/Methuen Giles Cooper Awards, Best Radio Plays of the Year, Figure With Meat
- 1989: Winner – BBC/Methuen Giles Cooper Awards, Best Radio Plays of the Year, By Where the Old Shed Used to Be

== Selected filmography ==
- 2024: The Innocence Project, television series for Hat Trick Productions
- 2023: Reputations, television series for Eon Productions
- 2021: Soho Square, television series for Rupert Everett
- 2019: Happiness, feature film for Barbara Broccoli and Eon Productions
- 2016: Marlowe, television series for Eon Productions
- 2014: Consuelo and Alva, feature film for Portobello Productions
- 2011: Codebreaker, Channel 4 – with Henry Goodman, Ed Stoppard
- 2009: The Last Days of Lehman Brothers, BBC2 – with James Cromwell, Ben Daniels, Corey Johnson, Alex Jennings, Michael Landes, Henry Goodman, Michael Brandon, James Bolam
- 2006: Maxwell, BBC2 (writer, actor) – with David Suchet, Patricia Hodge, Dan Stevens
- 2004: The Queen's Sister, Channel 4 – with Lucy Cohu, Toby Stephens, David Threlfall
- 2002: Julius Caesar, Warner Bros./TNT – with Christopher Walken, Richard Harris, Jeremy Sisto, Valeria Golino, Chris Noth
- 2001: The Mists of Avalon (uncredited), Warner Bros./TNT – with Anjelica Huston, Joan Allen, Julianna Margulies

== Theatre ==
- 2013/14: Strangers on a Train, Gielgud Theatre, West End, London – with Jack Huston, Laurence Fox, Miranda Raison, Imogen Stubbs, Christian McKay, and MyAnna Buring. Directed by Robert Allan Ackerman. Produced by Barbara Broccoli.
- 2004: Disguises, Alabama Shakespeare Festival
- 2002: Fallen (writer, composer), Merrimack Theatre, Boston
- 1999: Love to Madeleine, Pleasance Theatre, Edinburgh Festival
- 1992: Caledonian Road, White Bear Theatre, London
- 1988: God's Country, Old Red Lion, London
- 1987: Matthias (writer, director), Cooper Square Theatre, New York
- 1986: A Place to Watch Her Grow (writer, director), Cooper Square Theatre, New York

== Audio drama ==
- 2023: Night Games, returning serial for 25th Image (writer, producer/director, actor) – with Michael Maloney
- 2013: Tosca's Kiss, BBC Radio 3 – with Stephen Dillane, Kate Fleetwood
- 1997: Agonies Awakening (writer, composer, musical director), BBC Radio 3 – with Anton Lesser, Miles Anderson, Clare Holman, Hugh Quarshie, Josette Simon
- 1996: Beaumarchais, six-part serial, BBC Radio 4 – with Henry Goodman, Ronald Pickup, Bill Nighy, David Calder, Ron Cook
- 1996: Strangers on a Train, BBC Radio 4 (writer, composer, actor) – with Saskia Reeves, Michael Sheen, Anton Lesser, Bill Nighy
- 1995: The Mind-Body Problem, BBC Radio 4 (writer, composer, actor) – with Bill Nighy, Michael Maloney, Geraldine James
- 1993: A Romance, BBC Radio 4 – with Michael Maloney, Kristin Milward
- 1992: High Flyer, BBC Radio 4 – with Mick Ford
- 1992: A Sense of Things Moving Forward, BBC Radio 4/World Service – with Ben Kingsley, Frances Barber, Simon Russell Beale, Patrick Malahide
- 1991: Figure with Meat, BBC Radio 3 (writer, composer, singer) – with Clive Merrison, Judy Parfitt, Lynsey Baxter
- 1991: Piece, after Iain Banks, BBC Radio 5 – with Bill Paterson
- 1990: Love to Madeleine, BBC Radio 4 – with Richard E. Grant, Miranda Richardson, Phil Davis
- 1989: By Where the Old Shed Used to Be, BBC Radio 3 – with Miranda Richardson, Anton Lesser, Judy Parfitt
- 1988: Great Men of Music, BBC Radio 4 – with Phil Davis

== Translations ==
- 1990: The Devil by Maupassant, BBC Radio 4 – with Ian Holm
- 1989: The Baptism by Maupassant, BBC Radio 3 – with Anton Lesser
