= The Last Days of Lehman Brothers =

2009 Television Film

- Johnson and Cromwell as Fuld and Paulson
- Genre: Drama
- Written by: Craig Warner
- Directed by: Michael Samuels
- Starring: James Cromwell; Ben Daniels; Corey Johnson; Michael Landes; James Bolam
- Music by: Kevin Sargent
- Country of origin: United Kingdom
- No. of episodes: 1

Production
- Executive producer: Ruth Caleb
- Producer: Lisa Osborne
- Running time: 60 minutes
- Production company: BBC

Original release
- Network: BBC Two, BBC HD
- Release: 9 September 2009

The Last Days of Lehman Brothers is a British television film, first broadcast on BBC Two and BBC HD on Wednesday 9 September 2009. Filmed in London, it was written by Craig Warner and directed by Michael Samuels. It was shown as part of the BBC's "Aftershock" season, a selection of programmes marking the first anniversary of the collapse of the American investment bank Lehman Brothers. It featured James Cromwell, Ben Daniels, Corey Johnson, Michael Landes and James Bolam.

== Synopsis ==
The Last Days of Lehman Brothers summarizes the events that occurred over the weekend preceding Monday, 15 September 2008, when Lehman declared bankruptcy. Some of the story is narrated by the fictional character "Zach", a Lehman employee often taking orders directly from Lehman's chairman and CEO, Dick Fuld. Zach often breaks the Fourth wall, talking directly to the viewer.

Investment bank Lehman Brothers is in trouble after a turbulent six months in which their real estate investments have lost billions of dollars, causing steep drops in Lehman's stock. Dick Fuld (Corey Johnson), who brought the firm through other crises, is himself growing desperate. Fuld's plan to spin off the company's bad assets into a separate company does not satisfy investors, and Lehman stock drops by 75% in one week. Fuld's only remaining solution is to have Lehman acquired. Both Bank of America and Barclays are interested in purchasing the firm but are dissuaded because so much of Lehman's assets are "toxic" (worthless).

Lehman's problems have put the US government in a delicate position. The collapse of a firm of Lehman's size would have catastrophic economic repercussions well beyond the firm itself. Because there is no political support for a government bailout of the firm, the government turns to Lehman's competitors for help. Late on the afternoon of 12 September, a Friday, the leaders of the top investment banks on Wall Street, Lehman's competitors, are summoned to the Federal Reserve Bank of New York. Treasury Secretary Hank Paulson warns the incredulous group that Lehman is not too big to fail and that there will be no bailout using public money. Instead, Paulson cajoles the bank heads to work out a joint plan among themselves to relieve Lehman of its toxic assets, warning them that the steep price they would pay to save Lehman would be easily outweighed by the cost of its failure. He also intimidates the bank heads by reminding them that they too will soon need help. A solution must be found before trading opens in Japan on Monday morning.

By Friday evening, Bank of America begins stalling the deal, noting that Lehman's valuation puts them "underwater" by billions of dollars. Fuld must now depend on Barclays, and he is clearly growing more desperate. Retaining hopes that Bank of America will change its mind, Fuld secretly orders the firm's attorney Harvey R. Miller (Richard Durden) to begin drafting a bankruptcy petition. Miller is incredulous, telling Fuld that a Lehman bankruptcy would be an unprecedented catastrophe, akin to the United States government going bankrupt.

As Paulson's group searches for alternatives, Lehman's assets are subject to "valuation" by analysts from other firms. The analysts spend the night poring over boxes of paperwork. Calculation is made extremely difficult because much of the assets are based on collateralized debt obligation (CDO) instruments whose value is difficult to assess, though it is clear that Lehman put a higher value on certain CDOs than other firms.

Overseeing the valuation, Zach mentions how the trafficking of subprime mortgages caused the economic crisis. The narration then shifts to Ezzy, Zach's sister back in Tennessee. Ezzy describes how she got her house by getting a mortgage from a broker who did not exhaustively check her financial documents, and altered her paychecks. Her mortgage was then sent to New York where other bankers packaged her mortgage along with others, turning it into a security that could be bought and sold. Successive bankers repackage and grade the securities, and actively trade them at enormous profit, but devote little attention to whether the homeowners themselves can pay their mortgages. Eventually the financial world is forced to acknowledge that their CDOs are based largely on mortgages like Ezzy's, causing their value to collapse.

Discussion continues at the Fed throughout Saturday with little result. John Thain of Merrill Lynch (Ben Daniels) pulls out of Paulson's bailout group, telling Paulson that his company is in discussions with Bank of America. As they are no longer committed to Lehman, Bank of America is free to consider acquiring Merrill Lynch, which desperately needs the deal. Since the prospect of acquisition makes it less likely that Merrill will need help from the Fed, Thain has little incentive to continue participating in Paulson's discussions. Paulson does not discourage Thain from leaving, seeing that an acquisition of Merrill Lynch could prevent another crisis that would also require some intervention by the Fed. As Thain leaves, he learns from Paulson of the Fed's plans to bail out AIG, whose credit default swaps insure half of the western world's banking system.

By Sunday morning, Fuld receives word that Barclays has agreed to acquire Lehman Brothers, saving it. Jubilation is short-lived. Under British law, Barclays cannot guarantee Lehman's debts until its own shareholders vote on the matter, and that will not happen until Tuesday – beyond the Monday morning deadline. Paulson reiterates that the Fed will not "back-stop" Lehman, not even for the two days it will take for Barclays's shareholders to vote. With no chance of a buyout, Lehman has no choice but to file for bankruptcy. Harvey Miller is summoned to the Fed to prepare the bankruptcy petition. Miller is reluctant, warning Paulson that Lehman's assets exceed $600 billion. Paulson is adamant, telling Miller that he had been trying for months to get Dick Fuld to have Lehman acquired, but that the price was never high enough. Lehman's CFO signs the petition just minutes before the midnight deadline. A devastated Fuld leaves his office as Lehman's now unemployed staff clean out their desks.

In a voice-over, Zach notes that the Fed did bail out firms that faced collapse after Lehman.

== Cast ==
- Corey Johnson as Richard 'Dick' Fuld
- James Cromwell as Henry 'Hank' Paulson
- James Bolam as Ken Lewis
- Michael Landes as Zach
- Ben Daniels as John Thain
- William Hope as Bart McDade
- Michael Brandon as Jamie Dimon
- Henry Goodman as John Mack
- Alex Jennings as Tim Geithner
- Peter Polycarpou as Lloyd Blankfein
- David Annen as Greg Fleming
- Richard Durden as Harvey R. Miller
- Joshua Dallas as Ace
- Laura Brook as Donna Lewis
- Katrena Rochell as Ezzy
- Lauren Ward as Samantha

== Production ==
The film followed previous BBC drama Freefall and was produced following a collaboration between the BBC's factual and drama departments. The production is a work of fiction based on the real events that took place; the story was put together after watching interviews and with off-the-record chats with well-placed sources. It was completed in a short time frame; five weeks for scriptwriting, two for filming and five for editing. It was written by Craig Warner (writer of Maxwell and The Queen's Sister), directed by Michael Samuels (Caught in a Trap, The Curse of Steptoe) and produced by Lisa Osborne (Little Dorrit).

Warner told ABCNews.com that he tried to make the film "fun and comprehensible" because "a bunch of white guys sitting around in suits talking about money isn't very interesting." The fictional character of Zach (played by Michael Landes) was introduced as Fuld's aide, and Landes says that the voiceover he gives "brings an element of humor".

Osborne said that the production was about much more than just finance:

It was a disaster movie, it was Apollo 13 with the titans of Wall Street racing the clock to save the stricken bank; it was a Greek tragedy with Lehman's chief executive brought down by his own tragic flaw; it was Twelve Angry Men with solutions sought in smoke-filled rooms.

Due to the low budget, locations in London were sought instead of those in New York. Locations included Addington Palace near Croydon which acted as the Federal Reserve, and a disused office in London's Canary Wharf which served as Fuld's New York office. Coincidentally, the office had previously been used by Lehman Brothers and desks originally used by the company were used to dress the set.

== Reception ==
Overnight figures indicated that the production gained 1 million viewers, a 5% audience share, behind England's 2010 FIFA World Cup qualifier on ITV1, Motorway Cops on BBC One and Ramsay's Kitchen Nightmares USA on Channel 4.

Robert Epstein of The Independent on Sunday said it was "all very fast-moving" and that "ultimately, it was hard not to be bored by what was one of the most important – and dramatic – events of the past year. The end of Lehman – and the programme – couldn't come soon enough." The Guardian's Sam Wollaston didn't think his boredom was entirely his fault, saying he found it "unengaging" and "a mess". Tim Teeman of The Times said that "some vivid performances transcended the baffling material" and John Preston of The Daily Telegraph said:

If I hadn't read beforehand about how Last Days had been written and shot in a tremendous hurry, I think I might have guessed. The tone wobbled awkwardly at times, as did the focus. However, its faults were always faults of ambition, not timidity. Craig Warner's script consistently aimed high, with his boardroom exchanges being especially good: the chippy competitiveness and testosterone surges slowly subsiding into stunned disbelief.

Rachel Cooke in the New Statesman also said that Warner "tried his best" but that it was "dull and confusing in spite of a cast that included the superb James Cromwell". She also said that documentary The Love of Money about the Lehman Brothers collapse "wiped the floor" with The Last Days of Lehman Brothers, but Adam Sweeting said, comparing the documentary and the drama, that the former "gives you a lot more numbers and facts, but rather less human insight."

== See also ==
- Bankruptcy of Lehman Brothers
- Too Big to Fail
