= Strangers on a Train (novel) =

1950 psychological thriller novel by Patricia Highsmith

- First edition cover
- Author: Patricia Highsmith
- Cover artist: Irv Docktor
- Language: English
- Genre: Fiction
- Published: Harper & Brothers
- Publication date: March 15, 1950
- Publication place: United States
- Media type: Print
- Pages: 256

Strangers on a Train (1950) is a psychological thriller novel by Patricia Highsmith about two men whose lives become entangled after one of them proposes they "trade" murders.

It was adapted as a film in 1951 by director Alfred Hitchcock and again in 1969 by Robert Sparr. It has since been adapted in whole or in part for film and television several times. The novel was adapted for radio in 2004 by Craig Warner, and adapted for the stage in 2013 (also by Warner).

== Plot summary ==
Architect Guy Haines wants to divorce his unfaithful wife, Miriam, to marry the woman he loves, Anne Faulkner. While on a train to see his wife, he meets Charles Anthony Bruno, a psychopathic playboy who proposes an idea to "exchange murders": Bruno will kill Miriam if Guy kills Bruno's father. Neither of them will have a motive, and the police will have no reason to suspect either of them. Guy does not take Bruno seriously, but Bruno kills Guy's wife while Guy is away in Mexico.

Bruno informs Guy of his crime, but Guy hesitates to turn him in to the police. He realizes that Bruno could claim Guy's complicity in the planned exchange murders; however, the longer he remains silent, the more he implicates himself. This implicit guilt becomes stronger as in the coming months Bruno makes appearances demanding that Guy honor his part of the bargain. After Bruno starts writing anonymous letters to Guy's friends and colleagues, the pressure becomes too great, and Guy murders Bruno's father.

Subsequently, Guy is consumed by guilt, whereas Bruno seeks Guy's company as if nothing had happened. He makes an uninvited appearance at Guy's wedding, causing a scene. At the same time, a private detective who had worked for Bruno's father and who suspects Bruno of having arranged the murder of his father, establishes the connection between Bruno and Guy that began with the train ride, and suspects Bruno of Miriam's murder. Guy also becomes implicated due to his contradictions about the acquaintance with Bruno.

When Bruno falls overboard during a sailing cruise, Guy identifies so strongly with Bruno that he tries to rescue him under threat to his own life. Nevertheless, Bruno drowns, and the murder investigation is closed. Guy, however, is plagued by guilt, and confesses the double murder to Miriam's former lover. This man, however, does not condemn Guy, and instead dismisses Miriam, as well as women in general, while enjoying Guy's liquor. The detective who had been investigating the murders overhears Guy's confession, however, and confronts him. Guy turns himself over to the detective immediately.

== Theatrical and radio adaptations ==
Playwright Craig Warner acquired the stage rights to Strangers on a Train in 1995, and wrote both theatrical and radio adaptations of the story. The radio version was recorded and broadcast by the BBC, and released on CD in May 2004. The West End production of the play ran from November 2, 2013, to February 22, 2014, at the Gielgud Theatre and starred Jack Huston, Laurence Fox, Miranda Raison, Imogen Stubbs, Christian McKay, and MyAnna Buring. It was directed by Robert Allan Ackerman and its seven credited producers include Barbara Broccoli. A United Kingdom touring schedule was announced from January to March 2018.

Like the Hitchcock film, the Warner versions contain homosexual subtext. The radio version more closely follows the plot of the novel, although there are several differences in the denouement. Guy's eventual confession is to Anne, not to Miriam's lover. The detective succeeds in solving the original murder plot and confronts Bruno with the details, but declines to take further action because he believes that both men will spend the rest of their lives punishing themselves with guilt and fear. The devastated Bruno—with his security destroyed and realising that he will have no support or love from Guy—commits suicide in front of Guy by climbing onto a railway track where he is killed by an oncoming train. Anne persuades Guy to put the whole matter behind him and to resume his career in architecture.
