= Pippa Winslow =

American actress

- Education: University of California
- Alma mater: American Conservatory Theater
- Occupation: Actress
- Years active: 1979–present
- Children: 2
- Website: www.pippawinslow.com

Pippa Winslow is an American actress known for her work in West End theatre and major television series with a career spanning over four decades in theatre and television. She is well-known for her work in major West End productions and on streaming platforms like Netflix and Apple TV+.

== Early life and education ==
Winslow was born in the United States and raised in several states, including New York, New Jersey, and California. She obtained a BA in Drama from the University of California, Irvine and an MFA from the American Conservatory Theater in San Francisco. After acting in New York and in touring companies, she moved to the United Kingdom in 2001.

== Career ==
She appeared as Peggy "Blinkie" Douglas, American socialite and friend to Princess Margaret, in season 3, episodes 1 and 2 of The Crown. She was a member of the ensemble in the original West End production of Craig Warner's Strangers on a Train, opening 19 November 2013 at the Gielgud Theatre. She portrayed Carlotta in the United Kingdom premiere of Maury Yeston and Arthur Kopit's Phantom. She appeared in the West End Arts Theatre production of Bonnie & Clyde (musical) in 2022 as Cumie Barrow/Governor Miriam Ferguson/Eleanore, and in the Garrick Theatre production in 2023, as well as being in the West End Cast Recording of the musical. Also in 2023 she played Countess/Seamstress/Sybil Sullivan in the London premiere of Flowers for Mrs Harris. In 2024 she created the role of Carolanne in the Leeds Playhouse production of Paranormal Activity. In 2025 she reprised her role in the West End production at the Ambassadors Theatre (London) which ran from December to April 2026.

== Personal life ==
She is married and was settled with her family in Texas. In 2001 she relocated with her family to the United Kingdom and has dual citizenship in the United States and the United Kingdom.

== Filmography ==
=== Television ===
Year	Title	Role	Notes
2013	Banged Up Abroad	Ruthie Lambert	
2013	Obsession: Dark Desires	Mrs. Gallagher	
2015	Serial thriller	Mrs. Ball	
2015	Suspicion	Margaret	
2015	You, Me and the Apocalypse	US Politician	
2019	The Crown	Peggy "Blinkie" Douglas	
2019	The Diary of My Broken Vagina	Agony Aunt	
2021	Torchwood 2000	Jane Cavern	
2022	#honesty	Pip	
2022	Ten Percent	Jenny Salmon	
2024	Silo	Gladys	
2025	The Bombing of Pan Am 103	Senior Pan Am Lawyer	

=== Podcast series ===
List of voice performances in podcast
Year	Title	Role(s)	Notes
2023	People Who Knew Me	Kind Lady	Additional voices

=== Anime ===
List of voice performances in anime
Year	Title	Role(s)	Notes
1998	Generator Gawl	Technician / Oju Computer / Oju Computer Voice / Anchorwoman	English Dub

=== Film ===
Year	Title	Role	Notes
1987	Hollywood Uncensored	Musician	
2012	Change	Lucy	Short
2013	Sable Fable	Joan	
2013	Discord	Therapist	
2013	Arcade	Mother	Short
2014	Bardo	Interviewer	Short
2014	Mustard	Beatrice	Short
2015	Flotsam	DCI Katherine Leonard	Short
2015	Inquest of Desire	Mrs. Lewis	Short
2015	Us	Margaret	Short
2015	The Watch	Judie Wells	Short
2016	Louis, Where the Hell Are You?	Johanna	Short
2016	Angel of Decay	Mrs. Ball	Short
2016	Something Blue	Wife	Short
2016	A Nice Cup of Tea	Laura	
2016	Thinner Than Water	Elizabeth	
2017	Dropkick	First Lady	Short
2017	The Rizen	Scientist	
2017	Valla Desam	Surgeon	Indian and Tamil film
2017	Fear The Unknown Men	Madame Rouge	Short
2018	Teeth and Pills	Lisa	Short
2018	House Finch	Receptionist	Short
2018	Leave to Remain	Miss Brown	Short
2019	The Appointment	Beryl's friend	Short
2019	Traverse	Gail	Short
2020	Like No Tomorrow: An Apocalypse Anthology	Judith	
2020	How to Stop a Recurring Dream	Rambler	
2020	Rebecca	Mrs. Jean Cabot	
2021	The King's Man	United States Embassy Secretary	
2022	On the Other Foot	Brenda	
2022	Lion Versus the Little People	Debbie White	
2022	Revolution X	Rhonda	
2022	Realm of the Unknown	Lisa	
2023	Jericho Ridge	Pam Deluca	
2023	In Plain Sight	Sarah Manners	
2023	The Piper	Alice	
2023	X to X	Mama	Short
2024	Don't Forget Me	Mary	Short
2025	Mole	Gemima	Short
2026	Lure	Camilla	
2026	Left Behind, Still Standing	Stilton	Short
2026	Breaking Cover	Katherine	

=== Video games ===
List of voice performances in video games
Year	Title	Role	Notes
2012	Beyond Boulder Dome	Sarah Johnson / Mu	PlayStation 3
2013	Helgen Reborn	Gamblers	Xbox 360
2013	Absent	Dinner Lady / Librarian	PC
2018	Raid: Shadow Legends	Queen of Heart / Psychiatrist	PC
2023	Dead Island 2	Lola Konradt	PlayStation 5

=== Music video ===
Year	Song	Role	Singer
2019	Dear Ocean	Drunk Patient	Deva St. John
2026	Butterflies	Older Wife	Grace Davies

== Awards and nominations ==
Year	Award	Category	Result	Title	Ref.
2016	The Monthly Film Festival (TMFF)	Actress of the Month	Nominated	Something Blue	
2016	Feel The Reel International Film Festival	Best Actress	Nominated	Something Blue	
2016	Feel The Reel International Film Festival	Best Actress	Nominated	Something Blue	
2017	The Offies (Great Britain)	Best Actress	Nominated	9 to 5 the Musical	
2017	The Offies (Great Britain)	Best Actress	Nominated	9 to 5 the Musical	
2022	BroadwayWorld Awards	Outstanding Performance by an Alternate / Understudy	Nominated	Eureka Day	
2025	Rome Prisma Independent Film Awards	Best Supporting Actress	Won	Don't Forget Me	
