= Strangers on a Train (play) =

- 2013 production poster
- Written by: Craig Warner
- Genre: Thriller

Premiere
- Date: 2 November 2013
- Place: Gielgud Theatre

Strangers on a Train is a play written by Craig Warner and is based on the 1950 novel of the same name by Patricia Highsmith. The show made its West End and world premiere at the Gielgud Theatre on 19 November 2013, following previews from 2 November.

== Production history ==
Strangers on a Train is a thriller written by Craig Warner, based on the 1950 novel Strangers on a Train written by Patricia Highsmith. Officially confirmed on 20 September 2013, the play began previews on 2 November 2013, before making its world premiere at the Gielgud Theatre on 19 November, booking until 22 February 2014. The production is directed by Robert Allan Ackerman, produced by Barbara Broccoli, with design by Tim Goodchild, lighting by Tim Lutkin, sound by Avgoustas Psillas, projection design by Peter Wilms and costumes by Dona Granata. Casting for the production included Laurence Fox as Guy, Jack Huston as Bruno, Christian McKay as Gerard, Miranda Raison as Anne, Imogen Stubbs as Elsie and MyAnna Buring as Miriam. A typical West End performance runs for two and a half hours, including one interval.

A touring production of the play launched in early 2018, featuring a lead cast starring John Middleton, Christopher Harper, Jack Ashton, and Hannah Tointon, with key venues including Brighton, Sheffield, Glasgow, Birmingham, Manchester, Woking, Richmond, Cambridge, York, Aylesbury, and Cardiff.

The show is set to tour the UK again from early 2027, in a production directed by Roxana Silbert.

== Roles and original cast ==
Character	Original West End performer
Guy Haines	Laurence Fox
Bruno Anthony	Jack Huston
Gerard	Christian McKay
Anne Faulkner	Miranda Raison
Elsie Anthony	Imogen Stubbs
Miriam Haines	MyAnna Buring
Faulkner	Tim Ahern
Treacher	Nick Malinowski
Ralph	Alastair Natkiel
Dr Swan	Scott Sparrow
Myers	Tam Williams
Porter/Reporter	Luke Beattie
Company	Matt Andrews
Company	Antony Jardine
Company	Anna O'Byrne
Company	Pippa Winslow

== Critical reception ==
The West End production of Strangers on a Train received positive reviews from critics.
