= Highlander (upcoming film) =

Upcoming film by Chad Stahelski

- Directed by: Chad Stahelski
- Screenplay by: Kerry Williamson; Mike Finch
- Based on: Highlander by: Gregory Widen; Peter Bellwood; Larry Ferguson
- Produced by: Neal H. Moritz; Peter Davis; Chad Stahelski; Joshua Davis; Louise Rosner; Scott Stuber; Nick Nesbitt
- Starring: Henry Cavill; Russell Crowe; Marisa Abela; Dave Bautista; Karen Gillan; Djimon Hounsou; Jeremy Irons
- Cinematography: Dan Laustsen
- Music by: Tyler Bates
- Production companies: United Artists; Original Film; 87Eleven Entertainment; Davis-Panzer Productions; Bluegrass 7
- Distributed by: Amazon MGM Studios
- Country: United States
- Language: English
- Budget: $180 million

Highlander is an upcoming American fantasy action film directed by Chad Stahelski, written by Kerry Williamson and Mike Finch, and starring Henry Cavill, Russell Crowe, Marisa Abela, Dave Bautista, Karen Gillan, Djimon Hounsou, Drew McIntyre, and Jeremy Irons. It is a reboot of the film franchise of the same name.

The film will be released by Amazon MGM Studios under the United Artists banner.

== Premise ==
A 16th-century Scottish warrior discovers that he is not human but an ageless "immortal" destined to fight with others of his kind for "the Prize". After centuries of wandering the Earth, he must face the final immortal, the cruel and sadistic Kurgan, in an epic confrontation.

== Cast ==
- Henry Cavill as Connor MacLeod, the titular Highlander, an immortal Scottish blacksmith exiled from his home. He trains as a swordsman to fight against an evil warrior intent on claiming the Prize.
- Russell Crowe as Juan Sánchez-Villalobos Ramírez, a centuries-old immortal wanderer and skilled fighter who teaches Connor the history of the Immortals, and trains him to wield a sword.
- Marisa Abela
- Dave Bautista as The Kurgan, the most feared of the Immortals; said to be the last of a tribe of vicious barbarians, he seeks the Prize at any cost.
- Karen Gillan as Heather MacLeod, Connor's first wife.
- Djimon Hounsou as Sunda Kastagir, an African Immortal and Connor's only friend.
- Jeremy Irons as the leader of The Watchers, a group of non-immortal humans that observe and record the deeds of the Immortals, but who are pledged to never interfere with them.
- Drew McIntyre as Angus MacLeod, Connor's brother and chieftain of Clan MacLeod.
- Max Zhang
- Siobhán Cullen as Brenda Wyatt
- Jeon Jong-seo as Aris
- Nassim Lyes
- Kevin McKidd
- Wil Coban as Grigori Orlov

== Production ==
=== Development ===
On May 20, 2008, The Hollywood Reporter announced that Summit Entertainment was planning a remake of Highlander (1986) with Art Marcum and Matt Holloway writing the script and Peter Davis set to produce the new film, while on September 22, 2009, Justin Lin and Neal H. Moritz had signed on to direct and produce the remake, respectively. In March 2010, Moritz stated in an interview that "We're staying true to the mythologies as a whole of the Highlander series. Now there are certain things between all the different Highlanders that conflict with each other, but we're trying to stay true to the core of what we believe Highlander is, and it's a movie that's going to be made for the fans of Highlander, but also for people who are new to the franchise." On November 8, 2010, Live for Film announced that the film would be titled Highlander: The Reckoning. On February 9, 2011, it was announced that writer Melissa Rosenberg was "in negotiations to come on board the Highlander reboot to work on that script." In an interview with MTV in May 2011, Lin commented on the film, saying "I feel like right now, Highlander is in pretty good shape, but I still have to see all the other things come together for us to go make it." In August, Lin dropped out of the film due to commitments to other projects. Director Juan Carlos Fresnadillo later signed on to helm the remake, replacing Lin. However, in December 2012, Fresnadillo left the project due to creative differences.

On June 28, 2013, it was announced that Highlander: The Series writer and executive producer David Abramowitz would polish the film's script. On October 28, 2013, Summit hired Cedric Nicolas-Troyan to direct, and stated in April 2016, that he is still involved with the reboot. In November 2016, Chad Stahelski was confirmed to direct (instead of Nicolas-Troyan), and to produce with David Leitch under their 87Eleven Entertainment banner as well as their 87Eleven Action Design stunt company joining. In March 2018, Ryan J. Condal was set to write the script. On June 30, 2020, while doing an interview with Discussing Film, Stahelski, when asked about the progress of the film, said: "We're in heavy development mode on Highlander. Tweaking the scripts, writing, conceptualizing sequences, how we're going to do everything. We probably have a lot more in-person kind of things, but it hasn't slowed down our development process at all." On May 21, 2021, Kerry Williamson was revealed as the screenwriter.

On March 24, 2023, Stahleski shared that a challenge for the film was fully depicting the vast mythology. On October 27, 2023, it was reported that Mike Finch wrote the latest draft of the script. In April 2025, United Artists was in final talks to acquire the distribution rights for the film, with Scott Stuber and Nick Nesbitt serving as producers. According to TheWrap, Lionsgate sold the film to United Artists due to concerns over its budget.

=== Casting ===
On November 8, 2010, Vinnie Jones and Ray Stevenson were rumored to be considered for the role of the Kurgan. In June 2012, Ryan Reynolds was confirmed to play Connor MacLeod, but dropped out in June 2013. On August 29, 2012, Raw Leiba was rumored to star in Fresnadillo's film, either as Ramírez or a smaller role. In November 2014, the studio wanted actor Tom Cruise in the role of Ramírez, but Cruise was busy shooting Mission: Impossible – Rogue Nation (2015) and was reportedly not considering future projects at that time. On February 11, 2015, wrestler turned actor Dave Bautista was cast as The Kurgan.

On May 21, 2021, Henry Cavill had been cast in the lead role of Connor MacLeod. Stahelski confirmed Cavill's continued involvement with the project in March 2023. In October 2023, Deadline Hollywood reported that Mike Finch had written the most recent draft of the screenplay, and that the production team was preparing to begin production in 2024. In June 2025, it was announced Russell Crowe had been cast in the role of Ramírez. In July, Marisa Abela joined the cast in an undisclosed role. In August, Bautista was reconfirmed to be in the cast, and Karen Gillan joined the cast. The next month, Djimon Hounsou, Jeremy Irons, Max Zhang, and Drew McIntyre joined the cast. Siobhán Cullen, Jeon Jong-seo, Nassim Lyes, and Kevin McKidd joined the cast in November 2025. McKidd had been considered for the lead role back when the film was in its early development in 2009.

=== Filming ===
Principal photography began on January 28, 2026, in Scotland, having been pushed back by several months due to Henry Cavill sustaining an injury during pre-production rehearsals, with Dan Laustsen as the cinematographer. It was previously scheduled to begin in January 2025 and late September 2025. Filming also occurred in London, Poland (Łódź, Częstochowa and Gdynia) and Hong Kong.

In May 2026, production moved to Poland, with filming taking place at the Łódź Fabryczna railway station and near the Łódź Cathedral for action sequences featuring Cavill. Additional filming occurred at the Huta Częstochowa steel mill and St. Joseph's Church in Zabrze, where scale sets were constructed for scenes involving Jeremy Irons. In June 2026, the movie was shot in Gdynia, initially in restricted-access areas of Port of Gdynia and Gdynia Naval Port, and later in the parking garage of Centrum Handlowe Riviera.

On August 13, filming took place at Peel Street in Central, Hong Kong, with Stahelski, Cavill, Max Zhang, and Ada Choi seen on set. Filming continued along the Hung Hom promenade on August 14, where a fireworks scene was shot, and at the skyscraper The Center in Central on August 16, where Cavill, Zhang, Choi, and action choreographer Dion Lam were on set.

== Music ==
In January 2017, Stahelski revealed that the Queen soundtrack would be incorporated into the reboot and Tyler Bates would score the film.

== Future ==
In January 2017, Stahelski announced that the film was intended to be the first in a potential new trilogy.
