= Corey Johnson (actor) =

American character actor (born 1961)

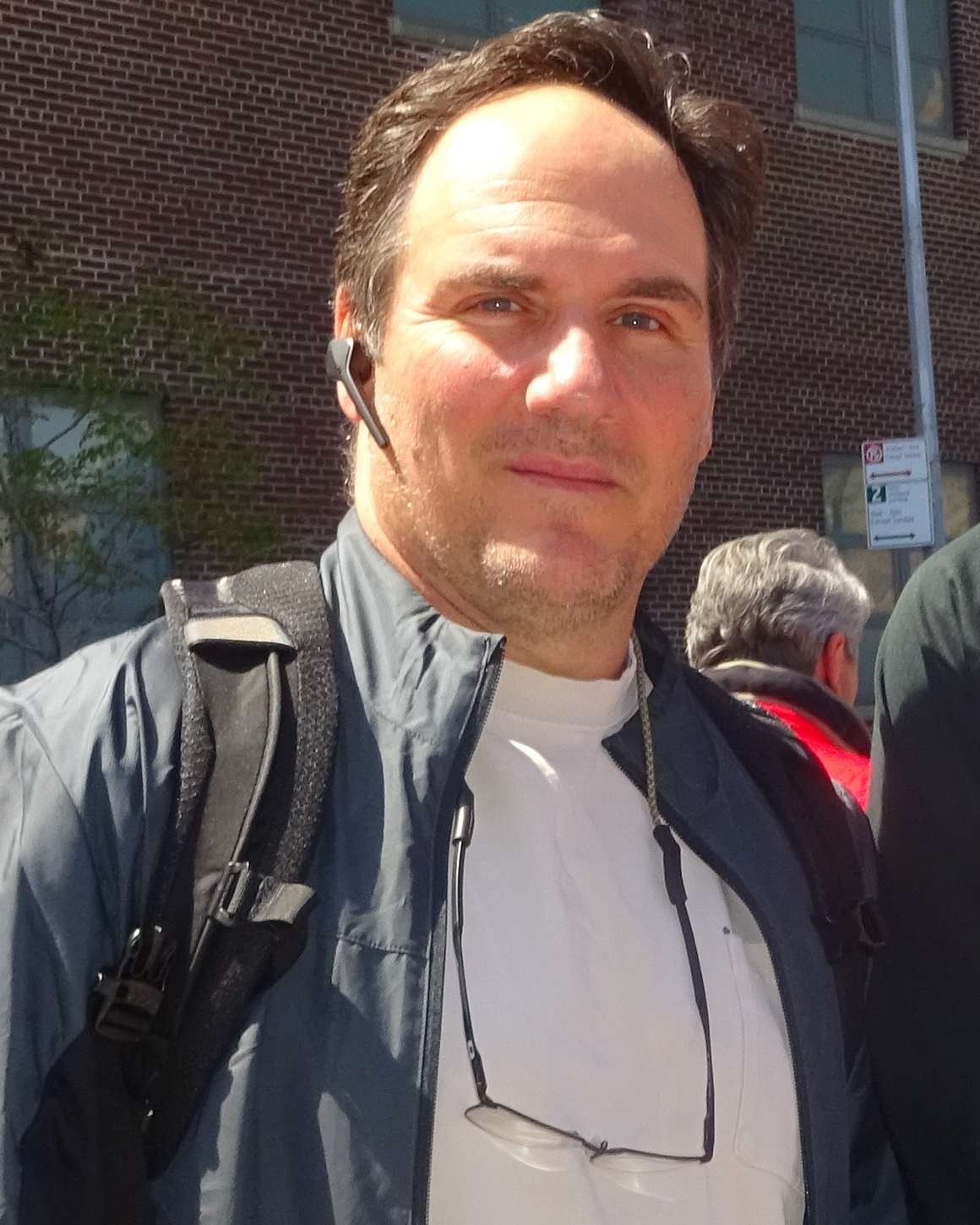
- Johnson in 2016
- Born: John William Johnson; May 17, 1961 (age 65); New Orleans, Louisiana, U.S.
- Education: Tulane University; Royal Central School of Speech and Drama
- Occupation: Actor
- Years active: 1992–present
- Spouse: Lucy Cohu (m. 1994; div. 2005)
- Children: 2

Corey Johnson (born John William Johnson; May 17, 1961) is an American actor largely active in the United Kingdom. He is known for his supporting roles in Hellboy (2004), The Bourne Ultimatum (2007), Kick-Ass (2010), Captain Phillips (2013), Ex Machina (2014), and Kingsman: The Secret Service (2014), as well as in television in Spooks ("The Special"), Doctor Who ("Dalek") and The Last Days of Lehman Brothers (as Richard S. Fuld, Jr., the final chairman & CEO of Lehman Brothers).

== Early life and education ==
Johnson was born John William Johnson in New Orleans, Louisiana. He was one of five children, having two brothers and two sisters. While attending Tulane University he joined Delta Kappa Epsilon Fraternity. He moved to England to study at London's Royal Central School of Speech and Drama, where he met his wife Lucy Cohu.

== Career ==
His films include Out for a Kill, The Contract, The Bourne Ultimatum, The Bourne Legacy, Saving Private Ryan, Guillermo del Toro's adaptation of Hellboy, the 2005 Ray Bradbury film A Sound of Thunder, and Harrison's Flowers. He also appeared in the award-winning mini series by HBO; Band of Brothers. Johnson had a breakout year in 1999, first playing the wiseguy American tomb-raider Daniels in The Mummy, then the bungling, dim-witted assassin Bruno Decker in Do Not Disturb opposite William Hurt and Michael Chiklis.

Johnson appeared as smug business tycoon Henry van Statten in "Dalek", an episode of the 2005 revival of Doctor Who. Other TV guest spots include Spooks, Foyle's War, Celeb and Nash Bridges. He played the role of Louis Nacke II, a passenger, in United 93. In April 2007, Johnson made his Broadway debut as Nixon's Chief of Staff Jack Brennan in Frost/Nixon.

While appearing on Broadway, Johnson also filmed The Caller starring Elliott Gould and Frank Langella.

In 2004, Johnson was nominated for a Best Actor award at the British TMAs for his portrayal of Eddie Carbone in Arthur Miller's A View from the Bridge. He has also provided voice acting for several video games including the video game tie-in with the films Reign of Fire and Constantine.

Johnson then played The Judge/Saint Peter in The Last Days of Judas Iscariot at the Almeida Theatre in London.

Until 19 September 2014, Johnson played Mitch in Benedict Andrews' revival of Tennessee Williams' A Streetcar Named Desire at the Young Vic theatre in London, alongside Gillian Anderson and Ben Foster. Johnson's performance was described as "lovely" and "measured" by The Evening Standard's theatre critic and the overall production also received considerable critical acclaim. In 2015, he played a helicopter pilot in the science fiction film Ex Machina, starring Alicia Vikander, Domhnall Gleeson and Oscar Isaac.

== Personal life ==
Johnson was married to actress Lucy Cohu from 1994 to 2005.

== Filmography ==
=== Film ===
Key
†	Denotes works that have not yet been released

Year	Title	Role	Notes
1993	The Innocent	Lou	
1996	Kabuto	Kazuma (voice)	English dub
1998	Saving Private Ryan	Navy Radioman (aka, Shore Party)	
1999	The Mummy	David Daniels	
1999	Do Not Disturb	Bruno Decker	
2000	Harrison's Flowers	Peter Francis	
2001	Black Hawk Down	U.S. Medic	Uncredited
2001	Last Run	Jon Neely	
2003	Out for a Kill	Ed Grey	Direct-to-video
2004	Hellboy	Agent Clay	credited as John William Johnson
2005	7 Seconds	Tool	Direct-to-video
2005	A Sound of Thunder	Christian Middleton	
2006	United 93	Louis J. Nacke II	
2006	Rollin' with the Nines	Chronic	
2006	The Contract	Davis	
2007	The All Together	Mr. Gaspardi	
2007	Davros Connections	Henry van Statten	Direct-to-video; Archival footage Documentary film
2007	The Bourne Ultimatum	Ray Wills	
2008	The Caller	Paul Wainsail	
2009	Thick as Thieves	Voutiritas	
2009	The Last Days of Lehman Brothers	Richard S. Fuld Jr.	
2009	Universal Soldier: Regeneration	Colonel John Coby	Direct-to-video
2009	The Fourth Kind	Tommy Fisher	
2010	Pimp	Axel	
2010	Kick-Ass	Sporty Goon	
2011	X-Men: First Class	Chief Warden	
2011	Day of the Falcon	Thurkettle	
2012	The Bourne Legacy	Ray Wills	
2013	How I Live Now	Consular Official	
2013	Captain Phillips	Ken Quinn	
2014	Blood Moon	Hank Norton	
2014	Kingsman: The Secret Service	Church Leader	
2015	Ex Machina	Jay	
2016	Jackie	Larry O'Brien	
2017	Megan Leavey	Master Sergeant	
2017	The Current War	Chester A. Arthur	
2018	The Titan	CI Jim Petersen	
2018	Hunter Killer	Captain	
2018	A Private War	Norm Coburn	
2019	Radioactive	Adam Warner	
2019	The Coldest Game	Donald Novak	
2021	The Mauritanian	Bill Seidel	
2022	Morbius	Mr. Fox	
2022	All the Old Knives	Karl Stein	
2022	Batgirl	—N/a	Cancelled
2023	Kandahar	Chris Hoyt	
2024	September 5	Hank Hanson	
2025	Köln 75	Lawrence 'Gus' Mailer	
2025	The Running Man	Motel Owner	
2026	Digger	Admiral Jacobs	
2026	Clayface	Cadillac Sal	

=== Television ===
Year	Title	Role	Notes	Ref.
1992	A Dangerous Man: Lawrence After Arabia	Reporter	Uncredited; Television film	
1994	Under the Hammer	Peter Pollack	Episode: "After Titian"	
1995	Casualty	Jackson - Ice Hockey Coach	Episode: "Exiles"	
1996	Over Here	Webster	Television film	
1997	Kavanagh QC	Eugene Styles	Episode: "In God We Trust"	
2001	Nash Bridges	Edward Bender	Episode: "The Partner"	
2001	Band of Brothers	Major Louis Kent	Episodes: "Why We Fight" and "Points"	
2002	Auf Wiedersehen, Pet	Gary Hathaway	Episode: "Another Country"	
2003	Second Nature	Bobby Willard	Television film	
2005	Doctor Who	Henry van Statten	Episode: "Dalek"	
2005	Spooks	Richard Boyd	Uncredited; Episode: "The Special" Part 1 & 2	
2006	Foyle's War	Sergeant Jack O'Connor	Episode: "Invasion"	
2007	Sex, the City and Me	Jeff Moran	Television film	
2009	The Last Days of Lehman Brothers	Richard "Dick" Fuld	Television film	
2011	Beaver Falls	Rick Traviata	Episode: "#1.3"	
2011	Comedy Showcase	Rex Masters	Episode: "Felix & Murdo"	
2011–14	Nova	Narrator	Recurring role; 5 episodes	
2012	Playhouse Presents	John D. Ehrlichman	Episode: "Nixon's the One"	
2012	Treasures Decoded	Narrator (voice)	Episode: "The Vinland Map"	
2013	Nazi Mega Weapons	Narrator (voice)	Episode: "Fortress Berlin"; Television documentary series	
2013	Nixon's the One	John D. Ehrlichman	Recurring role; 2 episodes	
2013–19	Ancient Mysteries	Narrator	Recurring role; 17 episodes	
2014	24: Live Another Day	Admiral	Miniseries, 2 episodes	
2015	The Saboteurs	General Pritchard	Miniseries, 3 episodes	
2015	Crossing Lines	Jay Pemberton	Recurring role; 2 episodes	
2017	America: Promised Land	Narrator	1 episode	
2017	Fearless	Larry Arlman	Miniseries; 2 episodes	
2017	Bounty Hunters	Foster	Recurring role; 2 episodes	
2017, 2020	The Windsors	Donald Trump	Recurring role; 2 episodes	
2017–18	Strike Back	Colonel Parker	Recurring role; 4 episodes	
2018	The Alienist	Hobart Weaver	Episode: "Psychopathia Sexualis"	
2018	The City and the City	Geary	Recurring role; 2 episodes	
2018	Deep State	Burrell	Recurring role; 5 episodes	
2019	Nazi Megastructures	Narrator	Episode: "Hitler's Mediterranean Fortress"	
2020	Devs	Dr. Goodman	Episode: "Episode 4"	
2021	Death in Paradise	The Love Demon	Episode: "I'll Never Let You Go"	
2021	Grantchester	Colonel Wade	Episode: "Series 6, Episode 4"	
2022	The Ipcress File	Captain Skip Henderson	Miniseries; 6 episodes	
2023	Emigracja XD	Profesorek	Recurring role; 2 episodes	
2023	Black Mirror	Clay	Episode: "Mazey Day"	
2023	Midsomer Murders	Rooster Harlin	Episode: "A Climate of Death"	
2024	The Day of the Jackal	Doug Wojack	Recurring role; 6 episodes	
2025	The Buccaneers	Mr McCarthy	Recurring role; 1 episodes	

=== Video games ===
Year	Title	Voice role	Notes	Ref.
1996	Bud Tucker in Double Trouble	Additional voices		
1997	I-War	Additional voices		
1997	Realms of the Haunting	Additional voices		
1997	Broken Sword II: The Smoking Mirror	Additional voices	Credited as John Johnson	
1999	Shadow Man	Marco Cruz, Milton T. Pike		
2001	Shadow Man: 2econd Coming	Thomas Deacon, Gabe, additional voices		
2001	Wave Rally	Additional voices		
2002	Stuntman	Additional voices		
2002	Reign of Fire	Denton van Zan		
2004	Vietcong: Fist Alpha	Additional voices		
2005	Constantine	Additional voices		
2006	Driver: Parallel Lines	Additional voices		
2009	Killzone 2	ISA Troops		
2011	Kinect Sports	Additional voices		
2013	Killzone: Mercenary	Commander Anders Benoit		
2017	Xenoblade Chronicles 2	Amalthus		
2018	Xenoblade Chronicles 2: Torna - The Golden Country	Amalthus		
2021	Shadow Man Remastered	Marco Cruz, Milton Pike		

=== Stage ===
Year	Title	Role	Notes	Ref.
2007	Frost/Nixon	Jack Brennan	Broadway debut	
2008	The Last Days of Judas Iscariot	Soldier / Judge Littlefield		
2010	Enron	Jeffrey Skilling		
2014	A Streetcar Named Desire	Harold Mitchell		
2015	Man and Superman	Mr. Malone		
