= Sen Mitsuji =

Australian actor and model (born 1987)

Sen Mitsuji 三辻 茜
- Born: 26 November 1987 (age 38); Sydney, New South Wales, Australia
- Occupations: Actor, model
- Years active: 2011–present
- Notable work: Origin; Brave New World
- Spouse: Kana Oya (m. 2022)

Sen Mitsuji (三辻 茜, born 26 November 1987) is an Australian actor and model. He is best known for his role as Shun Kenzaki in the YouTube science fiction series Origin. Recently, he starred in the Peacock series, Brave New World.

== Early life ==
Sen Mitsuji was born, the first of two sons, to a Japanese entrepreneur father and an Australian artist mother in Sydney. He attended and graduated from Sydney Boys High School.

== Career ==
Mitsuji was first scouted as a model at a music concert while part of a collegiate study abroad program in Tokyo. Though he returned to Australia to finish university studies, after graduation he moved back to Tokyo where he worked as a print and runway model, often featured in popular Japanese men's magazine, Men's Non-No (メンズノンノ) prior to his foray into acting. In 2015, he directed and wrote a short film in Japanese titled In Time.

His first major acting role was in the short lived YouTube Premium series Origin as Shun. Of the series he stated, "I'd never seen anything written [like it]. And that's exciting—to do something where you're not conscious of having to avoid any sort of trope that exists already, just free to interpret it as you'd like, without being constrained [by] what's come before you." Mitsuji has further voiced his love of sci-fi and fantasy, which he has stated are very similar in their paradoxical mix of escapism and incisive commentary. In February 2020, Mitsuji starred in a recurring role on the second season of the Netflix science fiction series Altered Carbon. In the same year, Mitsuji starred as Henry Foster in the miniseries adaptation of Brave New World. His character was described as "an Alpha Plus in every way".

== Personal life ==
He is a player on the club baseball team, Nakameguro Punch. He resides in Tokyo. He is married to the Japanese/Brazilian model Kana Oya since September 2022.

== Filmography ==
Year	Title	Role	Notes
2015	In Time	Director	
2018	Origin	Shun Kenzaki	Main cast
2019	The Man in the High Castle	Toru Kido	Recurring (season 4)
2020	Altered Carbon	Tanaseda Yukito	Recurring (season 2)
2020	Brave New World	Henry Foster	Main cast
