= Pyotr Ilyich Tchaikovsky in media =

This article lists appearances of the composer Pyotr Ilyich Tchaikovsky in popular media (e.g. films, drama music or otherwise).

== Films ==
=== Biographical ===
- Es war eine rauschende Ballnacht (It Was a Gay Ballnight) (1939, Germany)
  Directed by Carl Froelich
  Screenplay by Géza von Cziffra, based on a story by Georg Wittuhn and Jean Victor, and dialogue by Frank Thieß, adapted from Cziffra's novel
  Tchaikovsky was played by Hans Stüwe
- Heavenly Music (1943, US)
  Directed by Josef Berne
  Screenplay by Edward James, Paul Gerard Smith and Michael L. Simmons, based on a story by Reginald LeBorg
  Tchaikovsky was played by Lionel Royce
  Won an Oscar in 1944 for Best Short Subject – Two Reel.
- Carnegie Hall (1947, US)
  Directed by Edgar G. Ulmer
  Written by Karl Kamb and Seena Owen
  Tchaikovsky was played by Alfonso D'Artega
- Song of My Heart (1948, US)
  Directed and written by Benjamin Glazer
  Tchaikovsky was played by Swedish actor Frank Sundström
- Tchaikovsky (1969, Russia)
  Directed and written by Yuri Nagibin
  Tchaikovsky was played by Innokenty Smoktunovsky
  Nominated for an Academy Award for Best Foreign Language Film.
- The Music Lovers (1970, UK)
  Directed by Ken Russell
  Screenplay by Melvyn Bragg, based on Beloved Friend, a collection of personal correspondence edited by Catherine Drinker Bowen and Barbara von Meck
  Tchaikovsky was played by Richard Chamberlain
- Tchaikovsky's Wife (2022, Russia)
  Directed and written by Kirill Serebrennikov
  Tchaikovsky was played by Odin Biron

=== Films featuring Tchaikovsky's Music ===
- Fantasia (1940, United States)
  Directed by Samuel Armstrong, James Algar, Bill Roberts, Paul Satterfield, et al.
  Story by Joe Grant, Dick Huemer
  Tchaikovsky Nutcracker Suite
- None but the Lonely Heart (1944, US)
  Directed and written by Clifford Odets, based on the novel by Richard Llewellyn
  Film title taken from Tchaikovsky piece of the same name.
- Sleeping Beauty (1959, United States)
  Directed by Eric Larson, Wolfgang Reitherman, Les Clark, et al.
  Screenplay by Erdman Penner
  Tchaikovsky Sleeping Beauty
- Barbie in the Nutcracker (2001, United States)
  Directed by Owen Hurley.
  Screenplay by Linda Engelsiepen, Hilary Hinkle, & Rob Hudnut.
  Tchaikovsky The Nutcracker Op. 71
- Together (2002, China)
  Directed by Chen Kaige
  Screenplay by Xue Xiaolu and Chen Kaige
  Tchaikovsky Violin Concerto in D major, op.35 - Finale: Allegro vivacissimo
- V for Vendetta (2006, Canada)
  Directed by James McTeigue
  Screenplay by Lilly Wachowski
  Tchaikovsky 1812 Overture
- Le Concert (2009, France)
  Directed by Radu Mihaileanu
  Screenplay by Radu Mihaileanu
  Tchaikovsky Violin Concerto in D major, op.35 - I. Allegro moderato

== Television ==
- The Peter Tchaikovsky Story (episode of Disneyland, 1959)
  Tchaikovsky was played by Rex Hill as a boy and Grant Williams as a man
- Pride or Prejudice (1993, UK)
  BBC documentary
  Various theories investigated regarding Tchaikovsky's death
- Great Composers – Tchaikovsky (1997)
  The voice of Tchaikovsky was provided by Sir Ian McKellen
- Tchaikovsky (2007, UK)
  Two-part docudrama on the composer's life
  Episode 1: Tchaikovsky: The Creation of Genius (2007, UK)
  Episode 2: Tchaikovsky: Fortune and Tragedy (2007, UK)
  Tchaikovsky was played by Ed Stoppard
  Part of BBC concept The Tchaikovsky Experience which consisted of several television and radio broadcasts of works by Tchaikovsky and Stravinsky, as well as programs about St. Petersburg and Moscow.

== Music ==
- Shameful Vice
  Opera by English composer Michael Finnissy
  Libretto focuses on Tchaikovsky's last days and death
- All Over The World
  Song by British electronic pop group Pet Shop Boys
  Contains uncredited sample of Tchaikovsky
- Let There Be Rock
  Rock song by AC/DC
  References Tchaikovsky's influence on popular music.
- Lynguistics
  Hip Hop song by CunninLynguists
  Contains sample of Tchaikovskys Violin Concerto in D Op 35 - 1. Allegro Moderato.
- Roll Over Beethoven
  Rock song by Chuck Berry
  References Tchaikovsky in the songs lyrics.

== Video games ==
- The Evil Within 2
  Developed by Tango Gameworks
  Published by Bethesda Softworks
  Tchaikovsky's orchestral piece Serenade for Strings in C major is associated with serial killer Stefano Valentini.
- What Remains of Edith Finch
  Developed by Giant Sparrow
  Published by Annapurna Interactive
  During a baby's death scene, 'Waltz of the Flowers' plays from The Nutcracker
- Paper Mario: The Origami King
  Developed by Intelligent Systems
  Published by Nintendo
  The game features a comedic ballet production of Swan Lake, as well as a punk remix.
- Fallout 4
  Developed by Bethesda Game Studios
  Published by Bethesda Softworks
  There is a classical music radio station in the game that features both Swan Lake and Marche Slave by Tchaikovsky.
- The Last of Us: Left Behind
  Developed by Naughty Dog
  Published by Sony Computer Entertainment
  Tchaikovsky's piece String Quartet No. 3 (Tchaikovsky) is featured in the downloadable content of the video game The Last of Us
- Destiny (video game)
  Developed by Bungie
  Published by Activision
  Symphony No. 6 (Tchaikovsky) is featured during several missions in which the player must interact with a Russian supercomputer, named Rasputin.
- Sea of Thieves
  Developed by Rare
  Published by Xbox Game Studios
  A shortened version of the 1812 Overture is featured as a sea shanty in the game. It is playable by characters using any one of the game's four playable instruments.
- Little Big Planet 3
  Developed by Sumo Digital
  Published by Sony Computer Entertainment
  A remix of 'Waltz of the Flowers' from The Nutcracker appears in the game.
