= Lauren Ward =

American singer and actress (born 1970)

- Born: Lincoln, Nebraska, U.S.
- Education: University of North Carolina School of the Arts (BFA)
- Occupations: Actress, singer
- Years active: 1993–present
- Spouse: Matthew Warchus

Lauren Ward is an American singer and actress. She has appeared in Broadway, Off-Broadway and West End musicals and plays. Ward originated the role of Miss Honey in the original Stratford-Upon-Avon, West End, and Broadway productions of the musical Matilda, and was nominated for the Tony Award for Best Featured Actress in a Musical for her performance.

== Early life and education ==
Ward grew up in Kansas City, Missouri. She graduated from the University of North Carolina School of the Arts.

== Career ==
=== Broadway ===
Ward made her Broadway debut in the 1994 revival of Carousel as Jenny Sanborn and Heavenly Friend, understudying the role of Julie Jordan. She appeared in the musical 1776 in 1997 as Martha Jefferson. She appeared in the 2001 revival of Follies as Young Sally, where she met her future husband, director Matthew Warchus.

In 2010, Ward originated the role of Miss Honey in the new musical Matilda, based on the book Matilda by Roald Dahl in the Royal Shakespeare Company's production at Stratford-upon-Avon. Ward then played this role in the West End starting in October 2011 and on Broadway in 2013. For this role, Ward was nominated for the 2013 Tony Award for Best Featured Actress in a Musical.

=== Off-Broadway theatre ===
In 1995 she played the dual roles of Jennie/Daisy in the musical Jack's Holiday. In 1997 Ward originated the role of Violet Karl in the musical Violet, for which she was nominated for a Drama Desk Award for Outstanding Actress in a Musical. In 1999 she played Arlene Murphy in the musical Exactly Like You. In 2000, Ward played the role of Helen in Stephen Sondheim's Saturday Night at the Second Stage Theatre. In 2001 she appeared in the Manhattan Theatre Club production of the musical Time and Again as Emily. In 2003 Ward played Julie in the City Center Encores production of The New Moon.

=== London ===
Ward has performed in several London venues: in the West End, with the Royal Shakespeare Company and elsewhere. Some of these productions include: The Vagina Monologues (The Arts Theatre); Pericles, A Winters Tale (with the RSC); Batboy, Heathers (Royal Haymarket)’’; Caroline or Change (Chichester, Hampstead Theatre, West End);The Sound of Music as the Baroness (London Palladium, 2006);The Philadelphia Story at The Old Vic as Elizabeth Imbrie (2005);A Midsummer Night's Dream, Camelot the Musical at Regents Park; and, with the Lost Musicals series, Du Barry Was a Lady (2001) and Johnny Johnson. and most recently created the role of Virginia Creel in Stranger Things, the First Shadow. In 2019 she created Cynthia in the West End production of Dear Evan Hansen at the Noël Coward Theatre, for which she received an Olivier Nomination.

=== Film and television ===
Ward appeared in several episodes of the 2005 series Broken News. She has appeared in an episode of Torchwood and Law and Order SVU, The Last Days of Lehman Brothers (BBC), Touch of Frost (ITV), Kiss Me First (Channel 4), She also appeared in Story of a Bad Boy (the debut film by Tom Donaghy and produced by Jean Doumanian), Series 7: The Contenders, the 1997 film In & Out as a student.

== Personal life ==
Ward is married to British stage director Matthew Warchus, with whom she has three children.

== Filmography ==
=== Film ===
Year	Title	Role	Notes
1997	In & Out	Student	
1999	Story of a Bad Boy	Ludmilla	
2000	Joe Gould's Secret	Anne	
2001	Series 7: The Contenders	Doria Look-alike II	

=== Television ===
Year	Title	Role	Notes
2003	Law & Order: Special Victims Unit	Erin Russ	Episode: "Futility"
2005	Broken News	Alicia	5 episodes
2008	Torchwood	Jack's Mother	Episode: "Adam"
2008	A Touch of Frost	Miriam Walker	Episode: "In the Public Interest"
2009	The Last Days of Lehman Brothers	Samantha	Television film
2018	Kiss Me First	Mrs. Klasna	Episode: "Friends Let Us Down"
