= Brave New World (American TV series) =

American dystopian science fiction drama series

- Promotional poster
- Genre: Science fiction; Drama
- Based on: Brave New World by Aldous Huxley
- Developed by: David Wiener; Grant Morrison; Brian Taylor
- Starring: Jessica Brown Findlay; Harry Lloyd; Alden Ehrenreich; Hannah John-Kamen; Joseph Morgan
- Composers: Jordan Gagne & Jeff Russo
- Country of origin: United States
- Original language: English
- No. of seasons: 1
- No. of episodes: 9

Production
- Executive producers: David Wiener; Grant Morrison; Darryl Frank; Justin Falvey; Owen Harris; Brian Taylor (pilot)
- Running time: 41–56 minutes
- Production companies: David Wiener; Universal Content Productions; Amblin Television

Original release
- Network: Peacock
- Release: July 15, 2020

Brave New World is an American science fiction drama television series loosely based on the classic 1932 novel of the same name by Aldous Huxley. It premiered on the day NBCUniversal streaming service Peacock launched, July 15, 2020. In October 2020, the series was cancelled after one season.

== Premise ==
The series "imagines a utopian society that has achieved peace and stability through the prohibition of monogamy, privacy, money, family, and history itself." In an update of the original novel, an artificial intelligence system named Indra connects citizens via a wireless network.

== Summary ==
The series unfolds around John, who relocates from the Savage Lands to New London. New London's citizens live an anti-monogamous, anti-solipsistic, hedonistic existence. His mother (Linda) facilitates their escape from the Savage Lands but dies in the process. Although she wishes for a better life for her son, John's subversive influence infects and ultimately destroys New London society by disrupting its citizens' acceptance of its immoral caste system. In the aftermath, the New London AI (Indra), now embodied in John's ex-best friend (Bernard), is free to make the citizens of the Savage Lands less "savage" and John's now ex-girlfriend (Lenina) is promoted to make New London more "savage".

== Cast and characters ==
- Alden Ehrenreich as John the Savage
- Jessica Brown Findlay as Lenina Crowne, a technician who works at the Hatchery. She is a B+ who is a patient of Bernard.
- Harry Lloyd as Bernard Marx, an A+ who works as a counselor
- Kylie Bunbury as Frannie Crowne, a close friend of Lenina
- Lara Peake as Madysun
- Nina Sosanya as Mustafa Mond
- Joseph Morgan as CJack60/Elliott
- Sen Mitsuji as Henry Foster, the new Director of Stability
- Nicholle Hembra as Alpha Female
- Hannah John-Kamen as Wilhelmina "Helm" Watson
- Demi Moore as Linda, John's mother who lives in The Savage Lands in a house with her son
- Jimmy Winch as Young John the Savage
- Ed Stoppard as the Director of Stability

== Production ==
In 2015, Syfy announced the development of the series, with Darryl Frank and Justin Falvey producing. In 2016, writers Les Bohem, Grant Morrison, and Brian Taylor were attached to the project. On February 13, 2019, the series was moved to the USA Network, with David Wiener replacing Bohem as a writer and Owen Harris directing the pilot.

In April 2019, Ehrenreich was cast as John the Savage, and Lloyd was cast in the series regular role as Bernard Marx. In May 2019, it was announced that Jessica Brown Findlay was cast in the role of Lenina Crowne. In June 2019, Kylie Bunbury, Hannah John-Kamen, Sen Mitsuji, Joseph Morgan, and Nina Sosanya were added to the main cast in supporting roles, with Demi Moore set to appear in a recurring role. On September 17, 2019, NBCUniversal announced that the series would be moved to Peacock. The series premiered on July 15, 2020.

Dungeness Estate in Kent is the location for the "Savage Lands"; the Old Lifeboat Station there doubles as John and Linda's house.

On October 28, 2020, Peacock cancelled the series after one season. It marked the first major TV series cancellation for the streaming service.

== Release ==
Brave New World premiered on July 15, 2020, on Peacock in the United States and Sky One in the UK on October 2, 2020. Internationally, the series was originally scheduled to premiere on Amazon Prime Video in Oceania and New Zealand on August 21, but the series was instead released on September 18, 2020. In Canada, the series was released on Showcase on September 13, 2020. In Russia, it was released on July 16, 2020, on the streaming service KinoPoisk HD. In Germany, the series was released on the streaming service TVNOW at the end of September 2020. In the rest of Europe, the series was released on the streaming service Starzplay on October 4, 2020. In Australia, it was released on the streaming service Stan on October 16, 2020.

== Episodes ==
No.	Title	Directed by	Teleplay by	Original release date
1	"Pilot"	Owen Harris	Grant Morrison & Brian Taylor and David Wiener	July 15, 2020
In a world without privacy where people are ranked, Lenina Crowne (a B+) is told by Bernard Marx (an A+) that her sexual relationship with Henry Foster (an A+) is beginning to appear anti-social for its seeming exclusivity. Later, Marx visits a group of Epsilons (E's) and finds out that one of them has committed suicide. He begins to think that the "soma" pills people take to feel happy might not work on every feeling of pain. About halfway into the episode, we are shown behind the scenes of The Savage Lands, an amusement park in an unattractive part of America. John the Savage receives a single bullet from a woman named Madysun and is told that he's "being given a chance."
2	"Want and Consequence"	Owen Harris	David Wiener	July 15, 2020
After a confrontation with his boss, Bernard is sent away to The Savage Lands on a futuristic rocket. Lenina joins him on this trip, which is her first ever outside New London. Together, they tour the amusement park on a bus and discover life, family structure, and the four houses of The Savage Lands. Meanwhile, Lenina and Bernard's relationship starts to develop in an unconventional way; they admit they want each other exclusively. John’s encounter with Madysun raises anxiety and confusion, and he tells his mother Linda they should leave in fear of being killed. At the House of Monogamy where a marriage ceremony show takes place, Lenina spots John cleaning the door glass. In the middle of the show, rebellions break out and shoot the visitors, killing many and injuring others, including Bernard, who is shot in the shoulder. Lenina carries Bernard and runs away, looking for a place to hide.
3	"Everybody Happy Now!"	Craig Zisk	Molly Nussbaum	July 15, 2020
In The Savage Lands. John takes Bernard, who was shot in the massacre, and Lenina to his house. His mother, Linda, a former New London resident, decides to help them and convinces her son to leave with them for New London. The four of them are pursued by the revolution killers and reach an energy barrier protecting the spaceport. Right before crossing the barrier, Linda spots a laser dot on John's back and quickly moves herself to shield him. She dies on the way back “home”. Once at New London, Bernard resumes taking somas and seems unable to recall much of the trip. In contrast, Lenina hesitates to take somas and wants to discuss the shocking experience outside New London. Following his mother’s death, John, enraged and in emotional pain, is locked in a holding room for observation, to get “fixed”.
4	"Swallow"	Craig Zisk	Allison Miller	July 15, 2020
Bernard introduces John to life in New London. The results of John’s measurements show his profile already exists in New London’s system as an A. Assigned to supervise John’s transition from a savage to a member of the social body, Bernard grows more curious. He then discovers that John’s data on the optic lens have characteristics similar to those of the director. Lenina struggles with reintegrating after her visit to The Savage Lands and feels the urge to rebel against the values of New London. John runs away in confusion and finds himself in the company of the Epsilons; he meets CJack60. The director locates John, goes offline, and promises to give him a ride back to The Savage Lands on an exclusive rocket trip. Suddenly, John discovers that the director is his father and confronts him. As they argue, John accidentally pushes his father off the cliff. Lonely and depressed, Lenina returns to Henry and begs for their forbidden relations to return. Bernard receives the news about the director’s death and is told it’s the beginning of a new era.
5	"Firefall"	Aoife McArdle	Nina Braddock	July 15, 2020
CJack60 emerges as a distinctive Epsilon drawing a sad face on the window. In a meeting, the World Controller Mustafa Mond asks Bernard about John’s progress in integrating with the social body and warns him that Indra will interfere and make a “correction” if he fails his task. Despite Bernard’s attempts, John refuses to wear the optic lens and shows no interest in New London. Lenina shows up for a short time and exchanges a brief look with John. Frannie confronts Lenina about her solipsistic behaviour which leads to tension boiling between the two in a tennis game. Helm Watson, the director of Pleasure Bomb, fears her creative ideas for parties are running out. After meeting John, she realizes he could be the next creative element. John introduces her to storytelling, an element so alien to New London.
6	"In the Dirt"	Aoife McArdle	Elaina Perpelitt	July 15, 2020
John’s stardom grows as a storyteller. To New Londoners, stories of violence and lost love are as efficient as somas, and in return, John rejoices in the rewards of sex and fame—he’s the biggest trend now. Despite living in glory, John grows tired of telling the same stories and feels the need to disconnect. He takes off at night and stumbles into Lenina. He asks her to join him on a trip to other parts of New London where she’s never set foot. He then invites her to take off her lens and pretend they have a quiet life, fishing and farming, and that they're both happy. Their adventure ends in passionate lovemaking. Growing more concerned about Indra’s behaviour, Mustafa visits “Elliott”, a man living in an underground world and the one on which many Epsilon clones are based. Elliott tells “Jane” (that's how he calls Mustafa) not to worry and join him in his sleep. On her way back to New London, Indra chases Mustafa and attempts to kill her by flooding the underground tunnel.
7	"Monogamy and Futility, Part 1"	Andrij Parekh	Coleman Herbert	July 15, 2020
John and Lenina continue to rejoice in their imaginary life together away from New London. When Lenina returns the walkman to John, he declares his love for her. But Lenina must perform her duties, including taking part in a hide-and-seek game where the Alphas chase the Betas and then have sex. John asks her to stop having sex with other men, but if she does, Indra will recondition or banish her. Curious about the dating concept, Bernard asks Lenina out, and she accepts. Sitting together in a flying vehicle, Lenina rejects Bernard’s romantic advances and starts mumbling the melody of Perfect Day, which leads Bernard to suspect a possible relationship between her and the savage. At the bar, John vents his frustration at the Epsilons for being garbage men and throws a glass on the floor. CJack60 mimics John’s first, and then the Epsilons follow. In an attempt to stop Indra from destroying the world, Mustafa visits a decayed building searching for answers. Indra makes a hologramic appearance and tells “her mother” Mustafa that the answer to keeping humans happy forever is suicide.
8	"Monogamy and Futility, Part 2"	Andrij Parekh	Vivian Huang & Jean Pesce	July 15, 2020
John visits Helm’s workshop wearing the optic lens and allows her to access his memories. By watching them playing in front of her eyes, Helm discovers what it’s like to feel for the first time. To validate his suspicions about the savage and Lenina, Bernard forces Gary (a Gamma) to reveal their secretive relationship. Meanwhile, Frannie worries that Lenina is becoming more destabilizing and that everyone can sense she’s troubled. After his disturbing dialogue with Mustafa, Henry tells Bernard that John is needed more than ever as a distraction. The confrontation between Indra and Mustafa continues as the World Controller argues she didn’t design Indra to be suicidal. Indra counters she’s made selfless, and that she plans to use John as a fatal event. Mustafa realizes John is beyond Indra’s influence and the system can’t account for him. Bernard forcefully takes Helm’s lens, accesses John’s memories and exposes them publicly. The Epsilons disobey Bernard and Henry’s orders and begin their revolution.
9	"Soma Red"	Ellen Kuras	Grant Morrison	July 15, 2020
Bernard is appointed the new Director as Henry is found dead. CJack60 tells John he killed Henry and wants to start a revolution under John’s leadership. The rebellious Epsilons destroy the distillery that supplies New London with somas, then go out stabbing New Londoners. In the midst of this chaos, Mustafa warns Indra that once everything is wiped out, Indra will face loneliness which isn’t what it’s built for. As Mustafa begins to shut the system down, Bernard finds himself in a red void with Indra’s hologramic presence (The Jewel Net of Indra), and then the world around him starts to dissipate. He wakes up on a cliff-edge next to a mysterious gold box with Helm telling him she had a vision; he's the leader of a place that feels everything. Together, they travel to The Savage Lands looking for the rebellion’s leader and give her the box. The finale ends with John living his dream life in a simulation, and Lenina, the new Director of Stability, overlooking the remnants of New London from her office window. Indra is now free into the world and, for the first time, will experience every feeling just like a child.

== Reception ==
On Rotten Tomatoes, the series holds an approval rating of 46% based on 56 reviews, with an average rating of 5.70/10. The website's critical consensus reads:

"Brave New World is sleek and seductive, but not very daring, only skimming the surface of Aldous Huxley's dystopian epic without plumbing its philosophical depths."

On Metacritic, the series has a weighted average score of 55 out of 100 based on 26 reviews, indicating "mixed or average reviews".

Sonia Saraiya of Vanity Fair gave it a positive review:

"The new series is a clever modern adaptation, engaging deeply with the source material while dispensing with Huxley's glaringly racist themes and some of the misogyny, too."

Judy Berman of Time suggests the show owed more to Westworld than Huxley, but said the series looked gorgeous and the performances were solid. Even so, Berman found the show lacking:

"Television thrives on rich characters, but, in large part because it's set in a realm devoid of eccentricity, I struggled to get invested in this bunch. ... Brave New World feels [inert] as serialized TV."

Daniel D'Addario of Variety gave the series a mixed review:

"So many of the characters we meet in this series are not merely loathsome but have so completely had the character trained out of them through a lifetime of sloth that we grab onto what little signs of life are there elsewhere. ... Both Brown Findlay and Ehrenreich seem frustratingly tamped-down here. ... No wonder the actors seem exhausted; their project, deep into its first season, doesn't know what kind of show it wants to be."

=== Accolades ===
Award	Date of ceremony	Category	Recipient(s)	Result	Ref.
Visual Effects Society Awards	April 6, 2021	Outstanding Created Environment in an Episode, Commercial, or Real-Time Project	Guy Williams, Justin Gros-Désir, Markus Sterner, Ryan Clarke (for New London)	Nominated	

== See also ==
- Brave New World (1980 film)
- Brave New World (1998 film)
