= Haunting of the Queen Mary =

2023 British film

- Theatrical release poster
- Directed by: Gary Shore
- Screenplay by: Gary Shore; Stephen Oliver
- Story by: Stephen Oliver; Tom Vaughan
- Produced by: Brett Tomberlin; Nicholas Ferrall; Nigel Sinclair; Lars Sylvest; Thorsten Schumacher; Jason Newmark; Laurie Cook; Mali Elfman
- Starring: Alice Eve; Joel Fry; Nell Hudson; Wil Coban; Dorian Lough; Tim Downie; Jim Piddock
- Cinematography: Isaac Bauman
- Edited by: Colin Campbell; Ken Blackwell
- Music by: Jason and Nolan Livesay
- Production companies: Imagination Design Works; White Horse Pictures; Rocket Science Industries
- Distributed by: Vertigo Releasing
- Release dates: 20 July 2023 (Italy); 9 October 2023 (United Kingdom)
- Running time: 125 minutes
- Country: United Kingdom
- Language: English
- Box office: $1.4 million

Haunting of the Queen Mary is a 2023 British horror film directed by Gary Shore and starring Alice Eve and Joel Fry.

It was first released in Italy on 20 July 2023, then in the United Kingdom on 9 October 2023.

== Plot ==
“She had character, she had personality, but above all else she was the closest thing to a living being that I had ever commanded… she even breathed.” Captain John Treasure Jones

The Queen Mary is heading to New York, on one of her many voyages. It's 1938 and a family of three sneak into the ballroom in hopes that their young daughter can have an audition with Fred Astaire. In the present day, the ship has been docked in Los Angeles for many years, having become a tourist attraction titled "The Queen Mary No Escape". Anne and Patrick want to pitch a new idea for the attraction. Their son, Lukas, has an idea about a book they could write. After boarding, Lukas sees a small girl and follows her. Lukas disappears and shows up soaking wet with his camera gone. The next day Anne and Patrick return and Lieutenant Gibson informs them that the ship is closed for the day. They can look around and take as many pictures as they want - just not below deck M. Back in 1938, Gwen is invited to dance with Fred Astaire. Things go wrong and the ship starts to over heat. Captain Caradine refuses to slow down because he wants to keep the record of the longest continuously running ship. Back in the present day, Anne is lost and Patrick is trying to find her. They find each other on deck M, where the 'POOL' is located. They find a hidden door and tear it down to find the pool. They find Lukas's camera and take the full roll of film.

== Cast ==
- Alice Eve as Anne Calder
- Joel Fry as Patrick Calder
- Nell Hudson as Gwen Ratch
- Wil Coban as David Ratch
- Dorian Lough as Bittner
- Tim Downie as Lieutenant Gibson
- Wesley Alfvin as Fred Astaire
- Lenny Rush as Lukas Calder
- Florrie May Wilkinson as Jackie Ratch
- Jim Piddock as Captain Caradine
- Maddison Nixon as Ginger Rogers
- Angus Wright as Victor
- Sophia Dunn-Walker as Lady in White

== Production ==
Haunting of the Queen Mary was written by Gary Shore and Stephen Oliver, from a story by Oliver and Tom Vaughan. It is a British co-production between Imagination Design Works, Rocket Science and White Horse Pictures. Brett Tomberlin developed the feature film, first announced in 2013. In January 2019, Shore was announced to direct. By March 2021, it was reported that Haunting of the Queen Mary was planned as the first in a trilogy of horror films about the RMS Queen Mary, a retired ocean liner permanently moored in Long Beach, California. In October 2021, principal photography began in a studio developed by ARRI and Creative Technologies. Filming took place on board the RMS Queen Mary in November.

== Release ==
Haunting of the Queen Mary was released in the United States by Vertical Entertainment on 18 August 2023 in limited cinemas and on-demand. Vertigo Releasing released the film on digital on 9 October 2023.

== Reception ==
On the review aggregator website Rotten Tomatoes, 67% of 15 critics' reviews are positive, with an average rating of 5.80/10.

Matt Donato of Bloody Disgusting gave the film 3/5 stars, writing, "It's never as accomplished as Ghost Ship, Triangle, or other primetime haunted vessel comparisons, but it's still good enough to chill your bones cold like a rogue breeze off the ocean after midnight."

Common Sense Media's Jeffrey Anderson was more critical, writing, "Beautifully shot and with some striking, shocking images, this time-jumping horror tale nonetheless has a muddled narrative, and confusion and frustration eventually outweigh appreciation." He gave the film 2/5 stars. Mini Chhibber of The Hindu praised the film's visuals, but wrote, "the action is as murky as the ghostly lights on the ship and in the end you feel like the lady at the piano, banging her head on the keys, begging to be let out."
