= Beaumarchais (radio show) =

British radio programme, 1996

- Genre: Radio drama
- Running time: 30 minutes
- Country of origin: United Kingdom
- Language: English
- Home station: BBC Radio 4
- Starring: Henry Goodman; David Calder; Ronald Pickup; Ann Beach; Siobhan Redmond; Stephen Thorne
- Original release: 7 November – 12 December 1996
- No. of episodes: 6

Beaumarchais was a short-lived radio programme based on the life of Pierre-Augustin Caron de Beaumarchais broadcast on BBC Radio 4 that aired from 7 November to 12 December 1996. There were six half-hour episodes:

1. Noblesse Oblige
2. Cause Celebre
3. Femme Fatale
4. Hors de Combat
5. Droit d'Auteur
6. Le Mot Juste

It starred Henry Goodman in the title role, David Calder, Ronald Pickup as King Louis XV, Ann Beach as Madame de Pompadour, Siobhan Redmond as Marie Antoinette and Stephen Thorne as Beaumarchais' father.
