= Origin (TV series) =

- Genre: Science fiction; Drama
- Created by: Mika Watkins
- Starring: Natalia Tena; Tom Felton; Sen Mitsuji; Nora Arnezeder; Fraser James; Philipp Christopher; Madalyn Horcher; Siobhán Cullen
- Composer: Edmund Butt
- Country of origin: United States
- Original language: English
- No. of seasons: 1
- No. of episodes: 10

Production
- Executive producers: Andy Harries; Suzanne Mackie; Mika Watkins; Paul W. S. Anderson; Josh Appelbaum; André Nemec; Jeff Pinkner; Scott Rosenberg; Rob Bullock
- Producers: John Phillips; Alice Pearse
- Cinematography: David Higgs; Birgit Bebe Dierken; Guilio Biccari; Martin Fuhrer
- Camera setup: Single-camera
- Running time: 41–60 minutes
- Production companies: CiTVC; Midnight Radio; Sony Pictures Television; Left Bank Pictures

Original release
- Network: YouTube Premium
- Release: November 14, 2018

Origin is an American science fiction drama series created by Mika Watkins that premiered on November 14, 2018, on YouTube Premium. Watkins also serves as a writer for the series and executive produces alongside Andy Harries, Rob Bullock, Suzanne Mackie, Josh Appelbaum, André Nemec, Jeff Pinkner, and Scott Rosenberg. On March 25, 2019, YouTube cancelled the series after one season.

== Premise ==
Origin follows "a group of strangers stranded on a spacecraft bound for a distant planet. The abandoned passengers must work together for survival, but quickly realize that one of them is far from who they claim to be."

== Cast and characters ==
=== Main ===
- Natalia Tena as Lana Pierce
- Tom Felton as Logan Maine
- Sen Mitsuji as Shun Kenzaki
- Nora Arnezeder as Evelyn Rey
- Adelayo Adedayo as Agnes "Lee" Lebachi
- Fraser James as Dr. Henri Gasana
- Philipp Christopher as Baum Arndt
- Madalyn Horcher as Abigail Garcia
- Siobhán Cullen as Katie Devlin

=== Recurring ===
- Wil Coban as Max Taylor
- Jóhannes Haukur Jóhannesson as Eric Carlson
- Nina Wadia as Venisha Gupta
- Maurice Carpede as Anthony Frost
- Clayton Evertson as Alan Young
- David Sakurai as Murakawa
- Hiromoto Ida as Hideto Yagami
- Aidan Whytock as Jonas Arends
- Millie Davis as Ruby Touré
- Ray Fearon as Omar Touré
- Nic Rasenti as Mike Gore

=== Guest ===
- Tara Fitzgerald as Xavia Grey ("The Road Not Taken")
- Anna Skellern as Jennifer Moore ("Bright Star")
- Belén Fabra as Captain Sanchez ("Bright Star")
- Jamie Quinn as Crosby ("Bright Star")
- Nathalie Boltt as Laura Kassman ("God's Grandeur")
- Aglaia Szyszkowitz as Margo Von Platen ("Fire and Ice")
- Anthony Paul as Caspar Von Platen ("Fire and Ice")
- Francis Chouler as Police Guard ("Fire and Ice")
- Togo Igawa as Eiichi Yagami ("The Wasteland")
- Fionnula Flanagan as Mia Anderson ("Funeral Blues")
- Alana Boden as Ayko ("Remember Me")
- Daniel Arreola ("Bright Star")

== Episodes ==
No.	Title	Directed by	Written by	Original release date
1	"The Road Not Taken"	Paul W. S. Anderson	Mika Watkins	November 14, 2018
Shun, a Japanese man, wakes up from hypersleep at a spaceship named Origin bringing him to a planet five light-years away named Thea. He was invited to live there by the SIREN Corporation to free himself from his job as a yakuza of syndicate Yagami-kai, initially suggested by brother Takeshi, who also registered for the trip but was killed by the Yagami-kai upon legal issues. He sees a shadow moving, which the group—Lana Pierce, Logan, Eric, Abigail, Lee, Henri Gasana, Vaneisha, and Katie—frequently sees. They roam around searching for anyone. While Lana, Shun, and a man go to the upper floor, another man in the same floor curiously presses a ladder retractor button, causing the man going up to fall and die. Shun and Lana learn that the solar sail is damaged. The group picks up a crew's signal, prompting four to search for him, while a woman investigates, and learns that there was an emergency evacuation that somehow left them. Shun and Lana enter a room where something hit the ship and finds a psychotic man, while the other two revives a crew named Evelyn Rey, who warns that the man inside the room is harmful.
2	"Lost On Both Sides"	Paul W. S. Anderson	Mika Watkins	November 14, 2018
Before registering for the trip, Lana was the bodyguard of the family of controversial American Senator Omar Toure, with whom she fell in love. He had a daughter named Ruby with whom she quickly got along with, but when a shooting occurred, Lana was beaten up by one of the perpetrators; she began shooting, unintendedly killing Ruby in the wardrobe. Back at Origin, she and Shun learn that the psychotic man is medic Max Taylor, who claims he was shot by Evelyn; Evelyn claims otherwise, however they agree something hit the ship that killed nearly everyone. Later, Max is revealed to be the true infected, and Shun shoots him. When Shun and Lana count the dead bodies, which should be ten, they only counted nine, meaning one escaped amid the massacre.
3	"Bright Star"	Mark Brozel & Paul W. S. Anderson	Mika Watkins	November 14, 2018
A flashback reveals that Evelyn left her dying father in Provence-Alpes-Côte d'Azur, France to be a crew at Origin. When it reached interstellar space and was set to travel at the speed of light, everyone was instructed to go on hypersleep. The ship shook so roughly that she bumped her eyes. Max blindfolded them to slowly heal, and they grow romantic gradually. When Origin plans to slow down, they are instructed back to hypersleep again, when rocks began damaging the solar sails. Passengers, who remained in hypersleep throughout. begin dying. Those remaining were evacuated, while Evelyn searched for Taylor. She found him infected and violent. Back in the present, Shun and Lana agree that Evelyn can identify if any among them are infected. Eric is revealed to be one, as he attempted to suffocate Evelyn but then flees. Shun and Henri go look for him.
4	"God's Grandeur"	Mark Brozel	Mika Watkins & Melissa Iqbal	November 14, 2018
Before going on Origin, Henri was offered by the South African government to be a geneticist to assassinate President Jokonya who is deemed detrimental for the country's future. When the experiment succeeds, he has a panic attack. Back on Origin, Eric attacks Logan then flees. Logan saw a moving string in Eric's eye. While searching for him, Henri finds Max's eye having the same string. To learn about it, he cuts Max open and discovers an vertebrate alien lying in his brain, possibly responsible for altering his mentality. Eric lures Vaneisha who was supervising Evelyn to an airlock. Considering the greater good, Henri purges the airlock, killing Eric and Vaneisha, and he suffers a panic attack. After everyone goes to sleep, Henri returns to the airlock and sees an escape hatch.
5	"Remember Me"	Ashley Way	Mika Watkins & Joe Murtagh	November 14, 2018
6	"Fire and Ice"	Ashley Way	Mika Watkins	November 14, 2018
7	"The Wasteland"	Juan Carlos Medina	Mika Watkins & Jack Lothian	November 14, 2018
8	"Funeral Blues"	Juan Carlos Medina	Mika Watkins	November 14, 2018
9	"A Total Stranger"	Jonathan Teplitzky	Jon Harbottle	November 14, 2018
10	"I Am"	Jonathan Teplitzky	Mika Watkins	November 14, 2018

== Production ==
=== Development ===
On October 26, 2017, it was announced that YouTube had given the production a series order for a first season consisting of ten episodes set to premiere in 2018. The series was created by Mika Watkins who was also expected to serve as a writer and executive producer alongside Andy Harries, Rob Bullock, and Suzanne Mackie from Left Bank and Josh Appelbaum, André Nemec, Jeff Pinkner and Scott Rosenberg. Production companies involved with the series were slated to consist of Midnight Radio, Left Bank Pictures, CiTVC, and Sony Pictures Television.

On January 24, 2018, it was reported that the series would premiere sometime around the end of 2018. On April 26, 2018, it was announced that Paul W. S. Anderson would direct the series' first two episodes. On August 27, 2018, it was announced on the show's official Twitter account that the series would premiere on November 14, 2018. On March 25, 2019, it was confirmed that YouTube had cancelled the series.

=== Casting ===
On April 26, 2018, it was announced that Natalia Tena, Tom Felton, Sen Mitsuji, Nora Arnezeder, Fraser James, Philipp Christopher, Madalyn Horcher, and Siobhán Cullen had been cast as series regulars and that Adelayo Adedayo, Nina Wadia, Johannes Johannesson, Wil Coban, and Tara Fitzgerald would also appear in the series.

=== Filming ===
Principal photography for the series took place in 2018 in South Africa.

== Release ==
On July 19, 2018, a teaser trailer for the series was released. On October 4, 2018, the first full-length trailer was released.

== Reception ==
On the review aggregation website Rotten Tomatoes, the series was holding a 69% approval rating with an average rating of 6.2 out of 10 based on 16 reviews. The website's critical consensus reads, "Origin's overstuffed space drama mimics many genre classics to varying degrees of success; thankfully, its stellar cast and withholding premise are intriguing enough to encourage exploring its mysterious -- if familiar -- corridors."
