= Codebreaker (film) =

2011 television film

- Written by: Craig Warner; Simon Berthon
- Directed by: Clare Beavan; Nic Stacey
- Starring: Ed Stoppard; Henry Goodman; Paul McGann; Jean Valentine
- Country of origin: United Kingdom
- Original language: English

Production
- Producers: Paul Ashby; Jennifer Beamish; Clare Beavan; Ryan Greenawalt; Patrick Sammon; Paul Sen; Bennett Singer
- Running time: 62 minutes

Original release
- Network: Channel 4
- Release: 21 November 2011

Codebreaker, also known as Britain's Greatest Codebreaker, is a 2011 television docudrama aired on Channel 4 about the life of Alan Turing. The film had a limited release in the U.S. beginning on 17 October 2012. The story is told as a discussion between Alan Turing and his psychiatrist Dr. Franz Greenbaum. The story is based on journals maintained by Dr. Franz Greenbaum and others who have studied the life of Alan Turing and also some of his colleagues.

== Plot ==
The film starts in October 1952 after Alan Turing (Ed Stoppard) has been convicted. He is talking to his psychiatrist, Dr. Franz Greenbaum (Henry Goodman). Dr. Greenbaum and Alan continue to discuss; Alan informs Dr. Greenbaum that he cannot talk about his war time activities. Dr. Greenbaum informs him that he can talk about anything he wants. Sir Dermot Turing, nephew of Alan, is shown and he goes on to explain how life was for John Turing (Alan's brother) and Alan Turing during their childhood. David Leavitt appears next and talks about Turing's school time activities. David further explains that Turing was good at mathematics and athletics. His favourite sport was running.

The scene shifts backs to the discussion between Turing and Dr. Greenbaum. Turing speaks about a school friend he was interested in, Christopher Morcom. They were in different houses so they could meet a couple of times a week. Turing worked on improving his handwriting because Christopher would make fun of it. Turing goes on to explain that he cared more about what Christopher thought about him than what he thought of himself. Christopher Morcom QC (nephew of Christopher Morcom) goes on to explain that Christopher and Turing became close friends during their school days. They were planning to join Cambridge University but on 13 February 1930 Christopher died.

The scene again shifts backs to the discussion between Turing and Dr. Greenbaum. Turing informs him that he wrote letters to Christopher's mother and even managed to acquire his photograph. He still has the photograph in his wallet, and he shows it to Dr. Greenbaum. Turing later goes on to publish his paper "On Computable Numbers, with an Application to the Entscheidungsproblem". A computer in those days did not mean a machine, it meant a person who calculates or computes. Turing proposes automating these tasks, proposing a universal Turing machine. It involved performing mathematical operations using zeros and ones. This became the basis of modern computers. Steve Wozniak goes on to explain how normal people these days carry and use Turing machines in the form of mobile phones, cameras, computers, etc. Alma Whitten explains that there are almost no fields of modern science and everyday life which are not impacted by a Turing machine.

As World War II broke out, he was recruiting to be part of Government Communications Headquarters based at Bletchley Park. It was a diverse group of people consisting of mathematicians, chess players and crossword puzzle solvers. Asa Briggs goes on to say "You needed exceptional talent, you needed genius at Bletchley and Turing's was that genius". The Germans were coding their messages using Enigma machine, which the Germans believed was unbreakable.

Turing speaks about proposing to Joan Clarke and how he broke the news that he had homosexual tendencies. But midway through he realized he could not continue with the relationship and called off the engagement. Turing admits he knew it would hurt Joan but he knew it was better to hurt her now rather than cheat on her and hurt her later. David Leavitt goes on explain how Alan Turing goes on to decrypt the German messages. Alan Turing designs the Bombe to decipher German Enigma-machine-encrypted secret messages.

Turing and Dr. Greenbaum continue to discuss if something like human consciousness can be kept in an inorganic vessel. The documentary now concentrates on Turing's paper on artificial intelligence "Computing Machinery and Intelligence". The movie now concentrates on Turing's sexuality and his interaction with Arnold Murray which finally leads to his downfall. Turing and Dr. Greenbaum discuss Turing's relationship with Arnold Murray. Turing explains that Arnold had moved into his house and he felt Arnold was stealing money from him. One day when he came home he found his father's pocket watch and other items missing. When Turing asked Arnold, Arnold admitted his friend Harry committed the burglary. Turing reported the crime to the police. During the investigation he acknowledged a sexual relationship with Murray. Dr. Greenbaum explains to him that he should not have told them bluntly that he was homosexual.

Turing entered a plea of "guilty", despite feeling no remorse or guilt for having committed acts of homosexuality. Turing was convicted and given a choice between imprisonment and probation, which would be conditional on his agreement to undergo hormonal treatment designed to reduce libido. The documentary goes on to explain the impact of those events on Turing. During this stage Turing writes an article called "The Chemical Basis of Morphogenesis" describing the way in which non-uniformity (natural patterns such as stripes, spots and spirals) may arise naturally out of a homogeneous, uniform state.

Turing was targeted by government officials, which led him to feel that he could never have a normal life. The hormonal treatment also started having impact on him. Turing admits to Dr. Greenbaum that he should have gone to prison instead of taking the hormonal treatment. During another interaction with Dr. Greenbaum, Turing speaks about killing himself by using a poisoned apple like in the story "Snow White". The movie explains that On 8 June 1954, Turing's housekeeper found him dead. When his body was discovered, an apple lay half-eaten beside his bed. A post-mortem examination established that the cause of death was cyanide poisoning.

== Cast ==
- Ed Stoppard as Alan Turing
- Henry Goodman as Dr. Franz Greenbaum
- Paul McGann as Narrator (voice)

== Interviews ==
- Asa Briggs
- Jean Valentine
- David Leavitt
- Rolf Noskwith
- Dermot Turing
- Christopher Morcom QC
- Ian Stewart
- Martin Davis
- Matt Parker
- Steve Wozniak
- Alma Whitten
- Tony Sale
- Simon Schaffer
- Jeffrey Weeks
- Allan Pacey
- Maria Summerscale
- Barbara Maher
- Andrea Sella

== Production ==
Patrick Sammon said that he started working on Codebreaker in 2009. He first came across the story of Alan Turing in January 2004, during a trip to the Smithsonian's American History Museum.
