= The Rizen =

- Directed by: Matt Mitchell
- Produced by: Clare Pearce
- Starring: Laura Swift; Sally Phillips; Tom Goodman-Hill; Julian Rhind-Tutt; Adrian Edmondson; Bruce Payne
- Cinematography: Jamie Burr
- Production company: Lost Eye Films Ltd
- Release date: 19 June 2017
- Running time: 94 minutes
- Country: United Kingdom
- Language: English

The Rizen is a 2017 horror film written by Matt Mitchell and produced by Clare Pearce for Lost Eye Films, directed by Matt Mitchell for Lost Eye Films and starring Laura Swift, Sally Phillips, Tom Goodman-Hill, Adrian Edmondson, Julian Rhind-Tutt and Bruce Payne. The film was cast and produced by Clare Pearce and for a UK independent film the cast is full of well known cameos.

== Plot ==
In 1955, NATO and the Allied Forces have been conducting experiments in a bid to win the Arms Race. Now, they have succeeded but what the Army has unleashed threatens to tear our world apart. One woman must lead the only survivors past horrors that the military has no way to control - and fight to close what should never have been opened.

== Cast ==
- Laura Swift as Frances
- Sally Phillips as The Suited Woman
- Tom Goodman-Hill as Number 37
- Bruce Payne as Admin
- Julian Rhind-Tutt as Blast Door Scientist
- Stephen Marcus as The Executioner
- Patrick Knowles as Briggs
- Lee Latchford-Evans as Capture The Flag 1
- Jayson Dickens as Capture The Flag 2
- Simeon Willis as Lieutenant Franks
- Adrian Edmondson as Interviewer
- Christopher Tajah as Baughman
- Pippa Winslow as Scientist
- Laurence Kennedy as Dr. Julian Hicks
- Carol Cleveland as the Ancient One

== Production ==
The film was shot on-set in Kent in a huge warehouse and also in various Kent locations at Kelvedon Hatch Secret Nuclear Bunker in Kelvedon Hatch, and various town halls. Lost Eye Films managed to gain support from the local community throughout the production.

Further scenes filmed in Kent were at the Manor Way Business Park in Swanscombe which was used as a studio, supplemented by Gravesend Old Town Hall which featured as a Grand Hall, and one of the endless, dark corridors in the Powerhub in Maidstone was also used.

== Reception ==
David Dent stated that the film 'is a very bargain basement Resident Evil ripoff (actually it’s more like the second film in the franchise)'. Simon Ball described the film as a 'fabulous piece of restrained retro Brit Sci Fi' that evoked the 'golden age of Brit Sci-fi when the government in Westminster could just throw National Servicemen at a threat whether an alien jelly monster (1955’s The Quatermass Xperiment, or X the Unknown 1957), a massive dinosaur (Gorgo, 1961) or an outrageously huge gorilla (Konga 1961)'. Mike McLelland stated that 'despite the obviously limited budget, some stiff acting, and various technical disappointments, The Rizen propels forward, maintaining interest with well-choreographed action, a suitably mysterious central plot, and a snazzy visual flair. It is fast-paced and thoroughly entertaining, even if it doesn’t completely rise to the occasion'. John Migliore stated that 'great performances and a spectacular ending make The Rizen a winner…'.

Chris Luciantonio gave the film a less favourable review, commenting that 'even upon enduring the abysmal apocalyptic indolence of The Rizen for 140 incoherent minutes of dawdling about in underground corridors littered with feral mutants(?), I am still uncertain as to where director Matt Mitchell’s head was at behind the camera or if he can even make sense of the mess he made'. Similarly, Helen Murdoch stated that the film 'is a plodding and at times awful film to watch'. Jim McLennan lamented that the viewer has 'to endure painfully repetitive meandering through dark corridors for what seems like forever'. Sue Finn stated that 'with touches of the Cold War and '50s paranoia plus inter-dimensional portals', the film 'had the potential to be intriguing and involving, but is instead a wasted opportunity on the road to dullsville'.
