= Kana Oya =

Brazilian-born Japanese Model

- 大屋 夏南
- Born: November 10, 1987 (age 38); Belém, Pará, Brazil
- Occupation: Fashion model
- Agent: LDH
- Height: 1.72 m (5 ft 8 in)
- Spouse: Sen Mitsuji (m. 2022)

Kana Lais Oya (born November 10, 1987), simply known as Kana Oya (大屋 夏南, Ōya Kana), is a Brazilian-born Japanese model who is represented by the talent agency, LDH. She was raised in Shizuoka.

== Biography ==
Oya was born in Belém, Brazil. Her mother is Japanese Brazilian and her father is Brazilian. She emigrated to Shizuoka Prefecture when she was three years old.

In 2003, she was a finalist for Elite Model Look. Oya debuted as a model when she was seventeen years old.

In 2005, she moved to Tokyo after graduating from high school to start her full-scale model activities.

In August 2013, Oya moved from Elite Japan (now Name Management) to LDH.

On September 24, 2022, she married actor Sen Mitsuji.

== Bibliography ==
=== Magazines ===
- Vivi, Kodansha 1983-, as an exclusive model from 2005 to 2009
- Glamorous, Kodansha 2005–2013, as an exclusive model from 2005 to 2013
- Sweet, Takarajimasha 1999-, as a regular model since 2007
- More, Shueisha 1977-, as a regular model from 2009 to 2014
- Ginger, Gentosha 2009-, as a regular model from 2009 to 2014
- Gina, Bunkasha, as an exclusive model since 2011
- Baila, Shueisha, as a regular model since 2014

== Filmography ==
=== Catalogs ===
Year	Title	Notes
2011–2015	Peach John	
2015–present	Excel	

=== Advertisements ===
Year	Title	Notes
2006	Cadbury "Whiteen"	
2010–2011	Kao "Cape Free Arrangement"	
2011–2013	Kao "Risesshu Aroma Charge"	
2013	G.u.	
2017	ABC-Mart	
2017	Kirin Beverage "Tropicana Essentials"	

=== Events ===
Year	Title	Notes
2006–present	Tokyo Girls Collection	
2010–present	Girls Award	

=== Music Videos ===
Year	Title	Notes
2006	Kreva "Have a Nice Day!"	
2014	Sandaime J Soul Brothers "C.O.S.M.O.S."	

=== TV series ===
Year	Title	Network	Notes
2008	MTV Japan Chart Top10	MTV Japan	VJ
2008	MTV International Top40	MTV Japan	VJ

=== Dramas ===
Year	Title	Network	Role	Notes	Ref.
2015	High&Low: The Story of S.W.O.R.D.	NTV	Sarah		
2016	High & Low Season 2	NTV	Sarah		

=== Films ===
Year	Title	Role	Notes	Ref.
2016	High & Low: The Movie	Sarah		
2017	High & Low: The Movie 2	Sarah		
