= Wil Coban =

English actor

Wil Coban is an English actor.

== Education ==
Coban studied acting at the Bristol Old Vic Theatre School, where he starred in productions of plays including Serious Money and Blue Stockings.

== Career ==
In April 2018, Coban was cast in the YouTube Premium series Origin. In February 2022, he was cast to play Jim McMillin in The Boys in the Boat, a film about the University of Washington's rowing team and their journey to compete in the 1936 Summer Olympics directed by George Clooney. Coban would be added to the cast of the Paramount+ series The Revenge Club in June 2025. He also appeared in the DC Studios film Clayface. He will next appear in the reboot of Highlander and Blade Runner 2099.

== Filmography ==
=== Film ===
Year	Title	Role	Notes	Ref(s)
2017	King Arthur: Legend of the Sword	Brother Blackleg		
2017	Justice League	Tortured Atlantean	Uncredited	
2019	Waiting for the Barbarians	Mandel's Guard		
2023	Haunting of the Queen Mary	David Ratch		
2023	The Boys in the Boat	Jim McMillin		
2026	Pressure	Private Tommy Cooper		
2026	Supergirl	Pub Brute		
2026	Clayface	Bones		
TBA	Highlander †	Grigori Orlov	Post-production	

=== Television ===
Year	Title	Role	Notes	Ref(s)
2015	Cuffs	McKenzie	1 episode	
2018	Origin	Max Taylor	Recurring role, 6 episodes	
2020	Cursed	Scrawny Paladin	1 episode	
2020	The Liberator	Captain Mark Northwood	Miniseries, 1 episode	
2025	The Sandman	Lord Azazel	2 episodes	
2025	The Revenge Club	Dan Marshall	Recurring role, 5 episodes	
2026	Blade Runner 2099 †	Hodge	Upcoming miniseries	
TBA	Moving †	Dominic	Season 2	

=== Video games ===
Year	Title	Role	Notes	Ref(s)
2017	Horizon Zero Dawn	Dran / Ron Felder / Sgt. Ames Guliyev	Voice	
2020	Total War Saga: Troy	Aeneas	Voice	
2021	Sherlock Holmes Chapter One	Jon	Voice	
2022	Horizon Forbidden West	Aldur / Aether	Voice	
2022	Xenoblade Chronicles 3	Various	Voice	
2024	Flintlock: The Siege of Dawn	Dukmar	Voice	
2025	Final Fantasy: The Ivalice Chronicles	TBA	Voice	
2026	1348 Ex Voto	Nessuno	Voice	
