= Ed Stoppard =

British actor (born 1974)

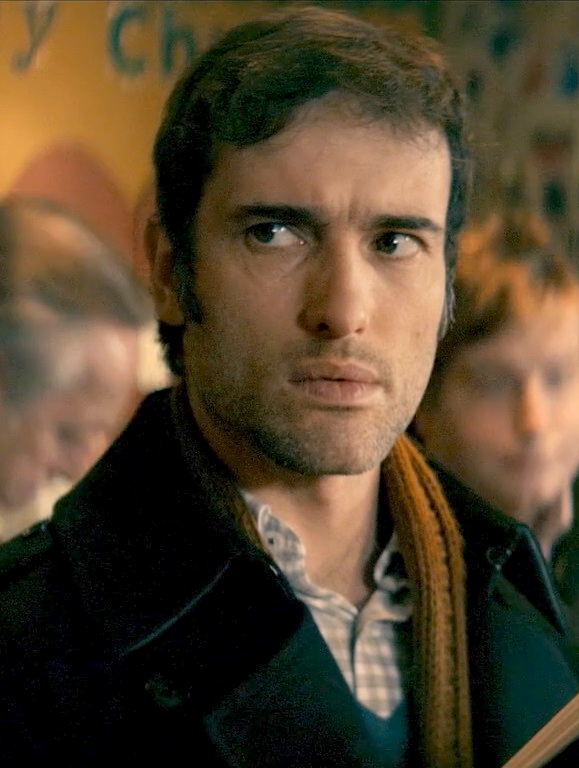
- Stoppard in Blackwood (2013)
- Born: Edmund Stoppard; 16 September 1974 (age 52); London, England
- Education: University of Edinburgh; LAMDA
- Occupation: Actor
- Years active: 2000–present
- Spouse: Amie Stoppard (née Stamp)
- Children: 3
- Parents: Tom Stoppard (father); Miriam, Lady Hogg (mother)
- Relatives: Oona King, Baroness King of Bow (cousin); Ted Graham, Baron Graham of Edmonton (first cousin, once removed); Chris Stamp (father-in-law)

Edmund Stoppard (born 16 September 1974) is an English actor. He is the son of playwright Tom Stoppard and Miriam Stoppard.

== Early life ==
Stoppard was born on 16 September 1974 in London, England, the son of playwright Tom Stoppard and Miriam Stoppard (née Stern), an author and physician. Both of his parents were Jewish, but he was raised in a secular household. He attended Caldicott School, and Stowe School, a boarding school in Stowe, Buckinghamshire. His parents divorced when he was 18, with his father entering into a long-term relationship with actress Felicity Kendal. He read French at the University of Edinburgh, graduating in 1997, and later trained at LAMDA.

His first cousin is the former politician Oona King, Baroness King of Bow and his first cousin, once removed, was politician Ted Graham, Baron Graham of Edmonton.

== Career ==
Stoppard's film credits include appearing as one of the main characters in The Pianist, Henryk Szpilman. He also starred as the main character, Thomas, in Joy Division, and as Lieutenant Addis in Nanny McPhee and the Big Bang.

In 2007 he played the title role in the BBC's drama-documentary Tchaikovsky: Fortune and Tragedy. In 2008 Stoppard returned to the stage in the Hampstead Theatre production of Amy Rosenthal's D. H. Lawrence biodrama On the Rocks, alongside Nick Caldecott and Charlotte Emmerson.

In 2010 he was cast in the role of Sir Hallam Holland in the 2010 BBC sequel to Upstairs, Downstairs. He also appeared in Any Human Heart, the Channel Four mini-series adaptation of William Boyd's critically acclaimed novel of the same name, alongside Matthew Macfadyen.

Stoppard was cast as Adrien Deume, a Swiss diplomat, Ariane's husband, in a screen version of Albert Cohen's novel Belle du Seigneur. He appeared in two television docudramas: playing Hans Litten in The Man Who Crossed Hitler, and Alan Turing in Britain's Greatest Codebreaker. Later that year Stoppard starred in British independent feature film Papadopoulos & Sons in which he played banking mogul Rob. The film was released in the UK through Cineworld on 5 April 2013. In 2013 he appeared alongside David Tennant and Emily Watson in the BBC miniseries, The Politician's Husband. From 2017 he played King Philip IV of France in the historical fiction series, Knightfall.

He plays the role of Director of Stability in Brave New World, a 2020 American sci-fi dystopian drama series on the streaming service Peacock. It is an adaptation of the novel of the same name by Aldous Huxley.

In 2026, Stoppard won the Best Director award at the Prague Independent Film Festival for his directorial debut, the short film The Confession.

=== Stage ===
Stoppard's stage credits include the title role in English Touring Theatre's 2005 Hamlet, alongside Anita Dobson (which also ran at the New Ambassadors Theatre) in Shakespeare's The Merchant of Venice, and Konstantin in Chekhov's The Seagull at the Chichester Festival Theatre in 2003. His West End credits include Tom Wingfield in a 2007 revival of The Glass Menagerie at the Apollo Theatre, and the British premiere of Wit. He appeared in a revival of Arcadia, written by his father, at the Duke of York's Theatre in the West End in June 2009 alongside Samantha Bond and Neil Pearson. He played Valentine Coverly. In early 2012, he played the role of Peter in the Trafalgar Studios' production of the Francois Archambault play The Leisure Society.

In 2020 Stoppard appeared in Leopoldstadt, a play by his father, Tom Stoppard at the Wyndham's Theatre, London. The play is set among the Jewish community of Vienna in the first half of the 20th century and follows the lives of "a prosperous Jewish family who had fled the pogroms in the East".

== Personal life ==
He and his wife Amie (née Stamp), a niece of Terence Stamp, met while working behind the scenes on the film Rogue Trader. They have three daughters.

== Filmography ==
=== Film ===
Year	Title	Role	Notes
2000	The Little Vampire	Von Sackville-Bagg	
2002	The Pianist	Henryk	
2002	Summer Things	Rick	Original title: Embrassez qui vous voudrez
2005	Animal	Sebastien Delnick	
2006	Joy Division	Thomas (older)	
2007	Fugitive Pieces	Ben (adult)	
2008	Brideshead Revisited	Bridey Flyte	
2010	Nanny McPhee and the Big Bang	Lieutenant Addis	
2010	Scooterman	Scooterman aka Gerald Jones	Short film
2012	Papadopoulos & Sons	Rob	
2012	Branded	Misha Galkin	
2012	A Grand Affair	Adrien Deume	
2014	Blackwood	Ben Marshall	
2014	Cryptic	Steve Stevens	
2015	Youth	Julian	
2015	Angelica	Dr. Joseph Barton	
2015	Ruby Strangelove Young Witch	Ted	
2018	Genesis	President James T. Pope	
2019	Judy	Interviewer	
2022	The Princess	The King	
2023	Surprised by Oxford	Dr. Condorston	
2023	Golda	Maj. Gen. Benny Peled	

=== Television ===
Year	Title	Role	Notes
2000	Relic Hunter	Laurent Halezan	Episode: "A Good Year"
2001	Queen of Swords	Ambassador Ramirez	Episode: "The Emissary"
2001	Murder in Mind	James Hillier	Episode: "Sleeper"
2003	In Search of the Brontës	Monsieur Heger	Mini-series
2003	Ferrari	Ferrari's alter ego	TV film
2005	Empire	Sebastianus	2 episodes
2005	The Somme	Captain Charlie May	TV film
2006	Ancient Rome: The Rise and Fall of an Empire	Josephus	Episode: "Rebellion"
2007	The Inspector Lynley Mysteries	Conrad McCaffrey	Episode: "Limbo"
2007	Tchaikovsky	Pyotr Ilyich Tchaikovsky	A two-part BBC drama documentary
2007	Agatha Christie's Marple	Stanislaw Malinowski	Episode: "At Bertram's Hotel"
2009	Terror! Robespierre and the French Revolution	Herault	TV documentary film
2010	Any Human Heart	Ben Leeping (older)	4 episodes
2010–2012	Upstairs, Downstairs	Sir Hallam Holland	9 episodes
2011	Zen	Vincenzo Fabri	Mini-series
2011	The Man Who Crossed Hitler	Hans Litten	TV film
2011	Britain's Greatest Codebreaker	Alan Turing	Docudrama
2013	Silent Witness	James Embleton	Episodes: "Legacy - Part 1", "Legacy - Part 2"
2013	The Politician's Husband	Bruce Babbish	3 episodes
2013	Mandela: The Prison Years	Richard Stengel	TV film
2014	Cilla	Brian Epstein	3 episodes
2015	The Musketeers	Doctor Lemay	5 episodes
2015–2016	Home Fires	Will Campbell	12 episodes (2 series)
2015–2017	The Frankenstein Chronicles	Lord Daniel Hervey	9 episodes (2 series)
2016	The Crown	Tony Longdon	Episode: "Gelignite"
2017	1066: A Year to Conquer England	William the Conqueror	Docudrama
2017–2018	Genius	Paul Éluard / Hans Albert Einstein	3 episodes
2017–2019	Knightfall	Philip IV of France	18 episodes (2 seasons)
2019	Trackers	Lucas Becker	5 episodes
2019	The Importance of Being Oscar	Various	TV film
2020	The Remote Read	Matron	Episode: "A Separate Peace"
2020	Brave New World	Director of Stability	4 episodes
2022	The Undeclared War	Richard Marston	4 episodes
2023	Hapless	Jon Teller	Season 2, episode 4: "The Donor"
2023	The Great	American Ambassador	Episode: "Choose Your Weapon"
2024	Franklin	John Jay	2 episodes
2025	Mo	Ambassador	Episode: "Oso Palestino (the Palestinian Bear)"

=== Video game ===
Year	Title	Role	Notes
2013	Assassin's Creed IV: Black Flag	Benjamin Hornigold	
