= Henry Goodman =

British actor (born 1950)

- Born: April 23, 1950 (age 76); Whitechapel, London, England
- Education: Royal Academy of Dramatic Art
- Occupation: Actor
- Years active: 1972–present
- Spouse: Sue Parker (m. 1975)
- Children: 2
- Honours: Two Laurence Olivier Awards

Henry Goodman (born 23 April 1950) is an English actor whose career spans theatre, television, film and radio. A two-time Olivier Award winner, he is best known for his stage work, including performances in Assassins, The Merchant of Venice, Angels in America, Guys and Dolls and Fiddler on the Roof, as well as screen roles in Notting Hill, Foyle's War, Captain America: The Winter Soldier and Call the Midwife.

== Early life and education ==
He was born in Whitechapel, London and attended the Central Foundation Boys' School. Goodman joined the Royal Academy of Dramatic Art in 1969.

== Career ==
=== Theatre ===
In 1991, he originated the role of Roy Cohn in the world premiere of Angels in America. He portrayed Charles Guiteau in the London premiere of Assassins at the Donmar Warehouse in 1992. He starred as Nathan Detroit in Guys and Dolls at the Royal National Theatre in 1996. The following year, he portrayed Billy Flynn in the West End revival of Chicago.

Goodman appeared on Broadway in three shows. He briefly replaced Nathan Lane as Max Bialystock in The Producers in 2002, but was fired after one month due to creative differences with Mel Brooks. The following year he returned to Broadway in Tartuffe.

In 2007, he starred as Tevye in Fiddler on the Roof at the Savoy Theatre in London's West End. In 2010, he played the role of Sir Humphrey Appleby in the stage version of Yes, Prime Minister at the Chichester Festival Theatre and later at the Gielgud Theatre, in the West End from September 2010.

In 2012, he played the title role in The Resistible Rise of Arturo Ui in Chichester and then in the West End to critical acclaim. In 2015, he played the title role in Ben Jonson's Jacobean comedy Volpone at the Royal Shakespeare Company (RSC), directed by Trevor Nunn and co-starring Matthew Kelly and Miles Richardson. His previous RSC appearance was in 2003 as the title role in Richard III, directed by Sean Holmes.

In 2017, he played Lucian Freud in Looking at Lucian, written by Alan Franks, at the Ustinov Studio at the Theatre Royal, Bath. Of this part, he said "I share an intense hunger to want theatre to be as meaningful as he wanted painting to be". In 2022, he played Hercule Poirot in Ken Ludwig’s adaptation of Murder on the Orient Express at the Chichester Festival Theatre and at the Theatre Royal, Bath. He was nominated for a UK Theatre Award for his performance.

=== Film ===
In 1999, Goodman played a memorable cameo role as the Ritz concierge in Notting Hill. He later portrayed a Hydra doctor in the 2014 film Captain America: The Winter Soldier, though he was not listed in the credits. He played the character again, renamed as Dr List, in the second season of the TV show Agents of S.H.I.E.L.D. and the 2015 film Avengers: Age of Ultron.

=== Television ===
Goodman played Dr Robert Silwood in "Secrets of the Dead", a 2001 episode of Dalziel and Pascoe. In 2010, he played Cecil Bernstein – co-founder, with his brother Sidney, of ITV Granada – in The Road to Coronation Street, about how the long-running soap opera was created. In 2003, he guest starred in the ITV series Foyle's War as corrupt American industrialist Howard Paige in "Fifty Ships", the opening episode of season 2 of the crime drama set in WWII. In 2013, he played the role of Sir Humphrey Appleby in the remake of Yes, Prime Minister which was launched on the Gold channel. He played Mr Fischer in the Christmas 2025 episode of Call the Midwife.

=== Radio ===
Goodman is also a respected radio actor. He portrayed Pierre Beaumarchais in the BBC Radio 4 series Beaumarchais in 1996, Melvin in The Attractive Young Rabbi (BBC Radio 4, 1999–2002), Ghassan Mehmoud in The Way We Live Right Now (a BBC Radio 4 adaptation of the Anthony Trollope novel The Way We Live Now) in 2008, and Leopold Bloom in BBC Radio 4's all-day adaptation of James Joyce's Ulysses for "Bloomsday" in 2012. He has also played author and chemist Primo Levi and a large number of other, often Jewish, characters on BBC Radio 4. Goodman is the narrator in the 2005 premiere recording by the Hallé Orchestra of the complete The Wasps which Vaughan Williams wrote for the 1909 Cambridge Greek Play production of The Wasps by Aristophanes.

== Awards and reputation ==
His awards include the Olivier Award for Best Actor in a Musical playing Charles Guiteau in Assassins at the Donmar Warehouse directed by Sam Mendes in 1993, and the Olivier Award for Best Actor for Shylock in The Merchant of Venice at the National Theatre directed by Trevor Nunn in 2000. In his autobiography, Antony Sher says Goodman's Shylock is "quite simply the best". He reprised his role for a TV film which was released in 2004.

He has also been nominated for the 1998 Olivier Award for Best Actor in a Musical for Chicago, a Critics' Circle Theatre Award for Best Actor (The Merchant of Venice), and a Theatre Awards UK for Best Performance in a Play (The Resistible Rise of Arturo Ui).

== Personal life ==
Goodman is Jewish and has five siblings. He is married to Sue Parker, a choreographer and dance director, and they have two children: Carla Goodman, a theatre designer, and Ilan Goodman, an actor and audio producer.

== Filmography ==
=== Television ===
- The Golden Bowl (mini-series, 1972)
- The Chicken Run (TV film, 1979)
- The Bill (1987)
- Bust (1988)
- This is David Lander (1988)
- London's Burning (1988)
- Murderers Among Us: The Simon Wiesenthal Story (TV film, 1989)
- After the War (mini-series, 1989)
- Three Up, Two Down (1989)
- Gentlemen and Players (mini-series, 1989)
- Rules of Engagement (mini-series, 1989)
- Act of Will (mini-series, 1989)
- Capital City (1989)
- Screen Two – Old Flames (1990)
- El C.I.D. (1990)
- Secret Weapon (TV film, 1990)
- Chain (mini-series, 1990)
- The Bill (1991)
- The Gravy Train Goes East (mini-series, 1991)
- Maigret (1992)
- Zorro (1992)
- True Adventures of Christopher Columbus (1992)
- Lovejoy (1993)
- Rides (1992–1993)
- Performance – Measure for Measure (1994)
- 99-1 (1994)
- Without Walls (1994)
- Smith & Jones (1995)
- Cold Lazarus (mini-series, 1996)
- Christmas (TV film, 1996)
- Masterpiece Theatre – Broken Glass (1996)
- Unfinished Business (1998–1999)
- Arabian Nights (mini-series, 2000)
- Dirty Tricks (TV film, 2000)
- American Voices (2001)
- Murder Rooms: Mysteries of the Real Sherlock Holmes (2001)
- Masterpiece Theatre – The Merchant of Venice (2001)
- Dalziel and Pascoe (2001)
- Hamilton Mattress (TV film, 2001)
- Animated Tales of the World (2002)
- Spooks (2002)
- Trust (mini-series, 2003)
- The Mayor of Casterbridge (2-part TV film, 2003)
- Foyle's War (2003)
- Keen Eddie (2004)
- M.I.T.: Murder Investigation Team (2005)
- Murder in Suburbia (2005)
- Shakespeare's Happy Endings (TV film, 2005)
- Mumbai Calling (2007)
- The Last Days of Lehman Brothers (TV film, 2009)
- Arena (2010)
- The Road to Coronation Street (TV film, 2010)
- Codebreaker (TV film, 2011)
- Playhouse Presents – Nixon's the One (2012)
- Falcon (mini-series, 2012)
- Midsomer Murders (2013)
- Yes, Prime Minister (2010)
- The Challenger Disaster (TV film, 2013)
- New Tricks (2013)
- Penny Dreadful (2014)
- Agents of S.H.I.E.L.D. (2015)
- London Spy (mini-series, 2015)
- Urban Myths (2017)
- Snatch (2017)
- Genius (2017)
- Watership Down (mini-series, 2018)
- The ABC Murders (mini-series, 2018)
- The New Pope (mini-series, 2020)
- Soulmates (2020)
- The Capture (2022)
- The Reckoning (mini-series, 2023)
- The Regime (mini-series, 2024)
- The Deal (2025)
- Call the Midwife (2025)

=== Film ===
Sources: Rotten Tomatoes, TCM and AllMovie.

- Queen of Hearts (1989)
- Son of the Pink Panther (1993)
- Mary Reilly (1996)
- Private Parts (1997)
- The Saint (1997)
- Notting Hill (1999)
- The Final Curtain (2002)
- The Life and Death of Peter Sellers (2004)
- Churchill: The Hollywood Years (2004)
- Green Street (2005)
- Colour Me Kubrick: A True...Ish Story (2005)
- Out on a Limb (2005)
- The Damned United (2009)
- Taking Woodstock (2009)
- The Half-Light (short film, 2011)
- Wonder (short film, 2012)
- Captain America: The Winter Soldier (2014)
- Woman in Gold (2015)
- Avengers: Age of Ultron (2015)
- The Surprise (2015)
- Burnt (2015)
- Present (short film, 2016)
- Altamira (2016)
- Love is Thicker Than Water (2016)
- The Chosen (2016)
- The Limehouse Golem (2016)
- Their Finest (2016)
- The Master of York (short film, 2017)
- Two Words (short film, 2018)
- Hunter Killer (2018)
- Forgotten Soldier (2018)
- Steven Berkoff's Tell Tale Heart (2019)
- The Good Traitor (2020)
- Sundown (2021)
- Love Gets a Room (2021)
- Tomorrow Morning (2022)
- Golda (2023)
- How to Succeed in Biscuits Without Really Trying (short film, 2024)
