= Bud Tucker in Double Trouble =

1996 video game

- Developer(s): Funsoft GmbH
- Publisher(s): Funsoft GmbH
- Release: 1996
- Genre(s): Adventure

Bud Tucker in Double Trouble is a 1996 point-and-click adventure game developed by Merit Studios (Europe) Limited and published by Funsoft. It follows a pizza delivery boy named Bud Tucker, who also has a night job working as a lab assistant. When the professor and his cloning invention are stolen by a man named Dick Tate, Bud Tucker must put a stop to Dick Tate's evil plans before he populates the world with billion clones of himself.
