= Maxwell (film) =

- Written by: Craig Warner
- Directed by: Colin Barr
- Starring: David Suchet; Patricia Hodge
- Country of origin: United Kingdom
- Original language: English

Production
- Running time: 90 minutes

Original release
- Network: BBC Two
- Release: 4 May 2007

Maxwell is a 2007 British television drama about the last days of media magnate Robert Maxwell, played by David Suchet, which was originally broadcast on BBC Two. The drama chronicles some of the events prior to Maxwell's mysterious death and the discovery of one of his era's biggest business frauds. Some fictional elements were added.

Suchet was later awarded an International Emmy for his performance.

== Cast ==
- David Suchet as Robert Maxwell
- Patricia Hodge as Elisabeth 'Betty' Maxwell
- Ben Caplan as Kevin Maxwell
- Daniela Denby-Ashe as Andrea, Maxwell's secretary
- Dan Stevens as Basil Brookes
- Duncan Bell as Richard Baker
- Tony Turner as Ron Woods
- Stuart Organ as Peter Laister

== Cultural references ==
While doing their research, the production team uncovered a number of tapes. Later in life, Maxwell had become increasingly paranoid and suspicious of his own employees, and so had the meeting rooms and office phones wired. The 79 cassettes include discussions with employees, the businessman suspected of disloyalty, and conversations with then-director of finance Basil Brookes. Maxwell's former head of security had kept them in a suitcase for over 15 years. Some of the actual tapes were played in the film.

Fellow media magnate and business rival Rupert Murdoch is mentioned a number of times in business meetings. Companies referred to include Maxwell Communications Corporation (MCC), Macmillan and Mirror Group.

In one scene, Maxwell was seen reading an edition of the satirical magazine Private Eye. Magazine editor Ian Hislop, and his colleagues, had attempted to investigate the scam and Maxwell later sued Hislop for libel.

In the credits, clips of real-live news coverage after his death and the discovery of fraud were shown.
