= St Joseph's Church, Zabrze =

Church building in Zabrze, Poland

Coordinates: 50.295170°N 18.771353°E

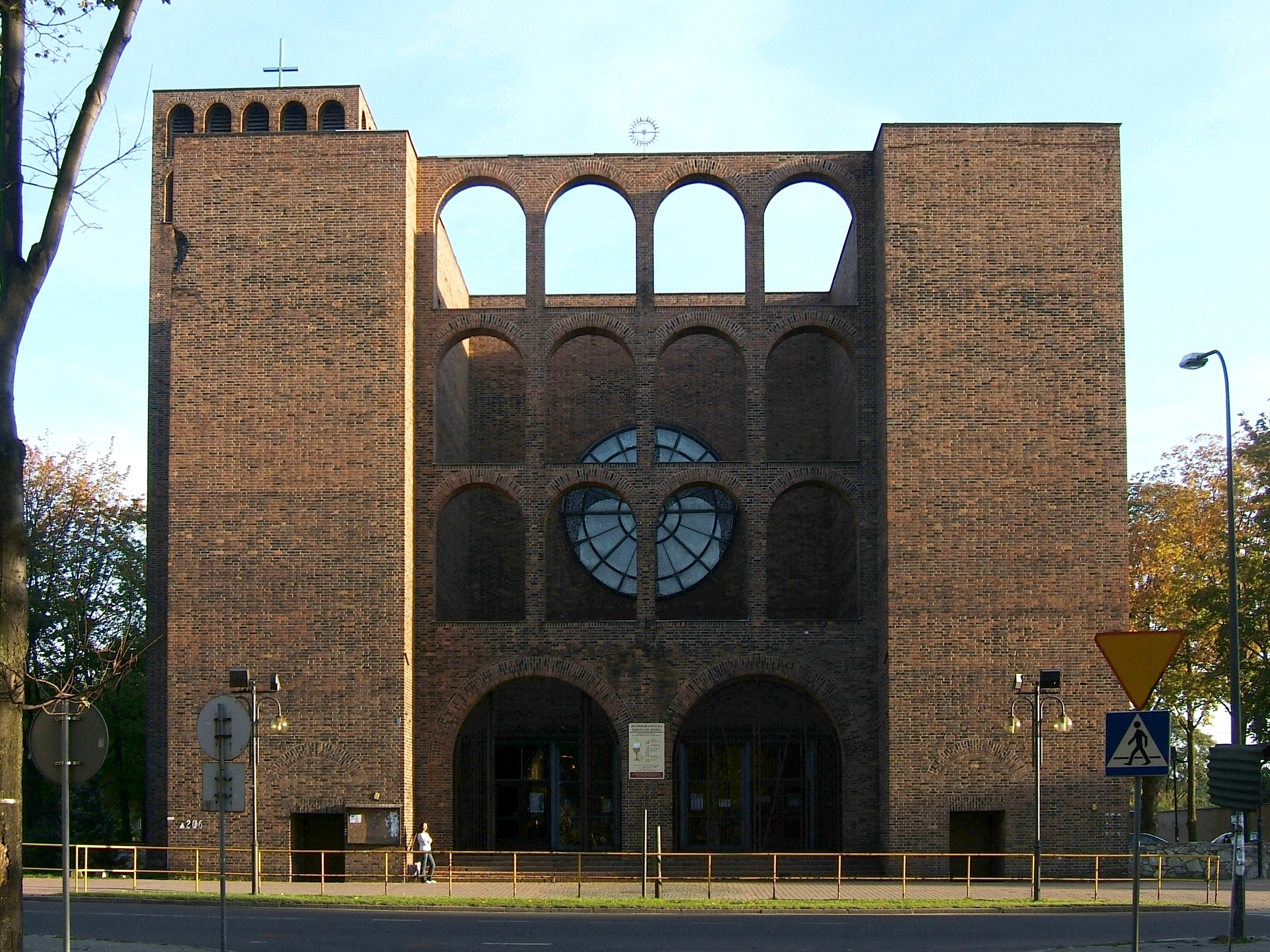
The front side of St. Joseph's Church

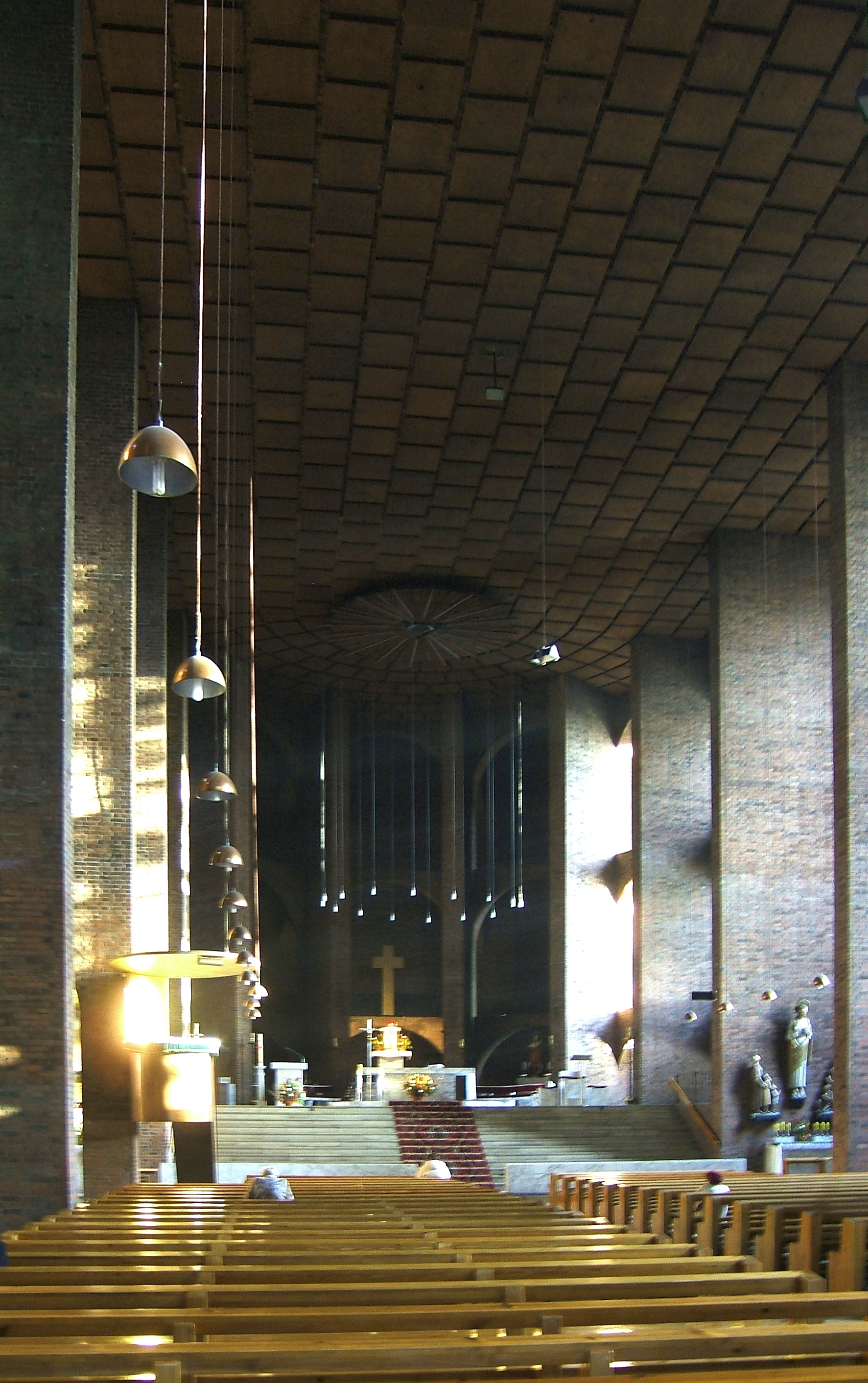
Interior

St. Joseph's Church (Polish: Kościół św. Józefa, German: Josefskirche) in Zabrze is a Roman Catholic church built in the years 1930–1931 in the Expressionist style. It is one of several Brick Expressionist buildings designed by Dominikus Böhm (1880–1955). It is located on the southwest side of central Zabrze at 104 Roosevelta Street.

== History ==
Groundbreaking for the church began on 31 August 1930. The parish of St. Joseph was founded in 1931, taking over part of the territory of St. Andrew's Parish, and the new church was completed in December 1931. On 4 September 1932, St. Joseph's Church was festively consecrated by Cardinal Adolf Bertram (1859–1945), the Archbishop of Breslau.

== Architecture ==
The church's entrance represents the "Porta Sacra" (Gateway to Heaven), with two round archways supporting a masonry screen of 12 smaller arches. On the east side is a tower with 40 arched windows representing the 40 years the Israelites wandered through the Sinai from Egypt to Canaan.

The interior is 67.5 meters long and 26 meters wide. The presbytery with the altar is elevated 2 meters above the floor; underneath that is a Miner's Chapel with 10 arched windows, featuring an altar to St. Barbara built by miners out of coal in the 1930s.

One of the stained glass windows in the church shows three scenes from scriptures concerning the Eucharist, and another shows the Holy Family. Behind and above the entrance is a rose window.
