= The Queen's Sister =

- DVD cover
- Genre: Biographical drama
- Written by: Craig Warner
- Directed by: Simon Cellan Jones
- Starring: Lucy Cohu; Toby Stephens; David Threlfall
- Music by: John Altman
- Country of origin: United Kingdom
- Original language: English

Production
- Executive producer: Rob Pursey
- Producer: Kath Mattock
- Cinematography: David Katznelson
- Editor: Tania Reddin
- Running time: 96 minutes
- Production company: Touchpaper Television

Original release
- Network: Channel 4
- Release: 27 November 2005

The Queen's Sister is a 2005 British biographical drama television film directed by Simon Cellan Jones, written by Craig Warner, and starring Lucy Cohu as Princess Margaret, the younger sister of Queen Elizabeth II. Toby Stephens and David Threlfall also star.

The film is a semi-fictionalized account of Margaret's life from 1952 until the mid-1970s. It was produced by Touchpaper Television, part of the RDF Media Group, and was broadcast by Channel 4 on 27 November 2005. It has been released on DVD by BBC Video.

== Plot ==
The drama opens with the disclaimer "Some of the following is based on fact. And some isn't". When Archbishop Fisher of the Church of England refuses her request to allow her and divorced war hero Peter Townsend, an equerry to her sister, to wed in a religious ceremony, and her brother-in-law and confidant Prince Philip advises her she will lose all her material possessions if they engage in a civil union, Margaret ends the relationship and plunges into a hedonistic lifestyle that frequently draws headlines in the press. She finds herself partnered with Tony Armstrong-Jones at a party that dissolves into an evening of sexual shenanigans, and she and the impoverished photographer begin to meet frequently for clandestine encounters in his dingy flat. When their relationship is made public, the two wed in an elaborate ceremony that is admired by those who embrace the monarchy and criticized by politicians who are shocked at the amount of money spent on the occasion while their constituents are struggling to get by on meagre wages.

The turbulent marriage falls victim to Margaret's increased drinking and Tony's indiscreet womanizing. She treats him more like a subject than a spouse, and he eventually moves out. When she is caught in flagrante delicto with the pianist from a restaurant she frequents, she and Tony escape to their hideaway in Mustique and try to present a united front for the press, but their scheme backfires when they are criticized for their lavish lifestyle in the tropics.

To escape the limelight, Margaret invites herself to the country home of her friends Rachel and Curly Burke. There she meets Roddy Llewellyn, a considerably younger aspiring pop singer. Shortly after she learns Robin Douglas-Home, with whom she once had a highly publicized affair, has committed suicide. Roddy suggests she stay with him at his cottage, which he shares with a commune of friends, to avoid the press, but a diligent photographer manages to catch them in an embrace. Tony Armstrong-Jones then announces the couple will divorce.

Margaret's continued drinking, drug-abuse and deepening depression lead to her being hospitalized for several weeks for what is described as "exhaustion". After her release, she returns to Roddy, who announces he is marrying one of his housemates. Margaret departs for Mustique, and in the film's final moments she is seen standing in the surf and pondering her future.

== Cast ==
- Lucy Cohu as Princess Margaret
- Toby Stephens as Tony Armstrong-Jones
- David Threlfall as Prince Philip
- Aden Gillett as Peter Townsend
- Dominic Mafham as Robin Douglas-Home
- Simon Woods as Roddy Llewellyn
- Alex Barclay as Billy Wallace
- Edward Tudor-Pole as Cecil Beaton
- Felicity Montagu as Gillian Fleming
- James Wallace as Sunny Blandford
- Caroline Harker as Rachel Burke
- Sam Spiegel as Professor Pierre Lavalle
- Benjamin Whitrow as Cronin

== Critical reception ==
The show aired on BBC America on 5 March 2006. In his review in Variety, Brian Lowry called the film "engaging if somewhat tawdry" and "occasional fun" and added, "Lucy Cohu does deliver a regal, rollicking performance in the title role ... [She] makes it all worth watching, conveying the contradictions - she can be down to earth and snotty all at once - that surely helped render Margaret an object of fascination in her time. Yet even with its sumptuous production values as Margaret jet-sets her way across the globe, it's a lightweight confection, especially when held up against the BBC's tony track record with historical fare. In other words, some BBC America productions are really outstanding, and some of them aren't."

On the website DVD Talk, Paul Mavis observed, "At times funny and satirical, at other times raunchy and low down, The Queen's Sister is always fast-moving and involving ... Propelling [it] along at breakneck speed is the lusty, vibrant performance by Lucy Cohu ... [who] is really quite affecting."

== Awards and nominations ==
In the 2006 British Academy Television Awards, the film was nominated for Best Single Drama, and nominations went to Lucy Cohu for Best Actress, Simon Cellan Jones for Best Director, and James Keast for Best Costume Design. The International Academy of Television Arts and Sciences nominated Cohu for Best Performance by an Actress, and the Royal Television Society named David Threlfall Best Actor for his performance in this and Shameless.
