= Lucy Cohu =

British actress (born 1968)

- Born: Lucy Ann Cohu; 2 October 1968 (age 58); Swindon, Wiltshire, England
- Education: Royal Central School of Speech and Drama
- Occupation: Actress
- Years active: 1991–present
- Spouse: Corey Johnson (m. 1994; div. 2005)
- Children: 2

Lucy Ann Cohu (born 2 October 1968) is an English stage and film actress, known for portraying Princess Margaret in The Queen's Sister, Evelyn Brogan in Cape Wrath and Alice Carter in Torchwood: Children of Earth.

== Early life ==
Lucy Ann Cohu was born in Wiltshire in 1968. She attended a boarding school, Stamford High School, as a child, and went on to train at the Central School of Speech and Drama.

== Career ==
Before she made a living from acting, she used to perform for children's parties. She has been quoted as saying that had she not found success as an actress she would have gone into children's nursing.

=== Television ===
Cohu's first acting job after graduating from drama school was at the Royal Exchange Theatre in Manchester, in a production of Jane Austen's Pride and Prejudice. She made her television debut in an episode of Casualty. She went on to work extensively in television, including playing the role Major Jessica Bailey in the popular ITV show Soldier Soldier followed by many parts in British television. In 2005, she portrayed Princess Margaret in the semi-fictional version of her life, The Queen's Sister, for Channel 4, for which she was nominated for Emmy and BAFTA awards. She was widely praised for the role; for example, Variety disliked the "somewhat tawdry biopic", but said that "Cohu makes it all worth watching". Cohu herself said she played Margaret like a proper woman with an insatiable and tremendous energy for life: previous images in her mind had been of a bloated and sick elderly princess who used a wheelchair. She hoped the production hadn't offended anyone as she really liked the Queen.

Cohu has also appeared in Cape Wrath, Ballet Shoes, as Theo Danes, and Torchwood: Children of Earth, as Alice Carter, the daughter of Captain Jack Harkness. She played Madame Maigret in the ITV television series Maigret starring Rowan Atkinson.

=== Film ===
Cohu has appeared in several films, including Gosford Park and Becoming Jane.

=== Theatre work ===
In 2018, Cohu appeared in a production of Speaking in Tongues at the Duke of York's Theatre, opposite John Simm, Ian Hart and Kerry Fox. Cohu received positive reviews for this performance. In February 2010 she began a five-week run in a production of An Enemy of the People at the Crucible Theatre, starring alongside Sir Antony Sher as Katrina Stockmann, and later appeared in Arthur Miller's Broken Glass at the Tricycle Theatre. She appeared in Dawn King's play The Trials at the Donmar Warehouse in London in August 2022.

== Personal life ==
Cohu lives in Kensal Green in Brent, London. Cohu was married to the actor Corey Johnson, but later divorced.

== Awards ==
In November 2008, Cohu won an International Emmy award for Best Actress for her role in the true-life drama Forgiven.

== Filmography ==
=== Television ===
Year	Show	Role	Notes
1991	Casualty	Theresa Johnson	One episode: "Beggars Can't Be Choosers"
1992	The Good Guys	Lucy Howells	One episode: "Relative Values"
1992	Sam Saturday	Jill Connor	One episode: "On the Other Hand"
1993	Agatha Christie's Poirot	Marianne Deroulard	One episode: "The Chocolate Box"
1994	A Very Open Prison	Reporter	
1994	The Dwelling Place	Isabelle Fischel	Three episodes: Episode 1.1, Episode 1.2, Episode 1.3
1995	Loving	Violet	
1995	Pie in the Sky	Miss Watson	One episode: "Swan in His Pride"
1996	The Ruth Rendell Mysteries	Magdelene Heller	Two episodes: "The Secret House of Death: Part 1", "The Secret House of Death: Part 2"
1997	Peak Practice	Gina Johnson	Three episodes: "State of Mind", "Running to Hide", "Borrowed Time"
1997	Rebecca	Rebecca de Winter	
1997	Casualty	Jayne Bazeley	Five episodes
1997	Queen: Made in Heaven	Woman	
1997	Soldier Soldier	Major Jessica Bailey	Seven episodes
1998	Wycliffe	Sophie Cattran	One episode: "Standing Stone"
1999	RKO 281	Dolores del Río	Uncredited
2000	Reach for the Moon	Amelia Marchant	Six episodes
2002	In Deep	Elinor	Two episodes: "Blood Loss: Part 1", "Blood Loss: Part 2"
2002	The Real Jane Austen	Cassandra Austen	
2003	Red Cap	Megan Rhodes	One episode: "Cold War"
2003	Sweet Medicine	Anna Winterson	Five episodes
2004	The Bill	Philippa Manson	Nine episodes (2004–2005)
2005	The Queen's Sister	Princess Margaret	
2006	Bombshell	Valerie Welling	
2006	Coup!	Amanda Mann	
2007	Cape Wrath	Evelyn Brogan	
2007	Forgiven	Liz	Won 2008 International Emmy award for Best Actress
2007	Ballet Shoes	Thea Dane	
2008	Einstein and Eddington	Mileva Einstein	
2009	Torchwood: Children of Earth	Alice Carter	
2009	Agatha Christie's Marple	Pat Fortescue	One episode: "A Pocketful of Rye"
2009	Murderland	Sally	
2010	Silent Witness	Rebecca Connelly	Two episodes: "Intent: Part 1", "Intent: Part 2"
2010	Midsomer Murders	Jenny Russell	One episode: "The Sword of Guillaume"
2012	Lewis	Marion Hammond	One episode: "Fearful Symmetry" (Series 6)
2012, 2016	Ripper Street	Deborah Goren	
2013	Atlantis	Circe	Two episodes: "Songs of Siren", "Touched by the Gods (Part 1)"
2013	Inspector George Gently	Margaret Turner	(Series 6)
2015	Broadchurch	Tess Henchard	
2015	Charlie	Terry Keane	RTÉ mini-series; 3 episodes
2015	Erotic Adventures Of Anaïs Nin	Anaïs Nin	Sky Documentary with Dramatic Reconstructions of events from her life.
2016	Death in Paradise	Caroline Bamber	Episode 5.2
2016–17	Maigret	Madame Maigret	Four episodes: "Maigret Sets a Trap", "Maigret's Dead Man", "Maigret: Night at the Crossroads", "Maigret in Montmartre"
2019	Summer of Rockets	Miriam Petrukhin	6 episodes
2020	COBRA	Rachel Sutherland	Series regular

=== Film ===
Year	Film	Role	Notes
1992	Pressing Engagement		
2001	Gosford Park	Lottie	
2007	Becoming Jane	Eliza de Feuillide	
2011	The Awakening	Constance Strickland	
2014	The Inbetweeners 2	Nikki	
2016	Maigret's Dead Man	Madame Maigret	
2016	Maigret Sets a Trap	Madame Maigret	
