= Robert Allan Ackerman =

American film and theatre director (1944–2022)

- Born: June 30, 1944; Brooklyn, New York, U.S.
- Died: January 10, 2022 (aged 77); Los Angeles, California, U.S.
- Occupation(s): Film, theatre director

Robert Allan Ackerman (June 30, 1944 – January 10, 2022) was an American film and theatre director. He directed numerous films since 1992.

Ackerman was born in Brooklyn, New York, on June 30, 1944, and moved to Kew Gardens, Queens, when he was five. He died from kidney failure at Cedars-Sinai Hospital in Los Angeles, on January 10, 2022, at the age of 77.

== Work ==
After graduating from Adelphi University, he worked for seven years in Harlem as a school teacher.

Ackerman directed Richard Gere in the Broadway production of Bent and Al Pacino in Salome.

Ackerman had five Emmy nominations and twice for the Golden Globes.
