= Hugh "Skip" McGee III =

American investment banker (born 1959)

Hugh E. "Skip" McGee III (born 1959) is an American investment banker who was formerly a senior executive at Lehman Brothers and Barclays. He is presently co-founder and chief executive officer of Intrepid Financial Partners, a power and energy focused merchant bank.

== Education ==
McGee graduated summa cum laude from Princeton University in civil engineering in 1981, and received a JD with honors from the University of Texas School of Law.

== Career ==
McGee began his career as a banker in the energy sector in 1987.

=== Lehman Brothers ===
He joined Lehman Brothers' natural resources group in 1992. He was co-head of Lehman Brothers' global energy practice in Houston, organizing the $3.4 billion rescue of energy trader Williams Cos. in 2002.

In December 2002, McGee became global head of investment banking in New York, succeeding Bradley Jack who was promoted to co-Chief Operating Officer with Joe Gregory. He was in charge of equity, debt, and mergers and acquisitions, and he introduced a new system that rewarded bankers for solving clients' problems instead of selling products, and a new slogan, "Investment banking is a team sport." Banking at Lehman under McGee returned revenues of $11.6 billion in 2004, but was still under pressure from president and chief operating officer Joseph M. Gregory for better performance; McGee disagreed with Gregory's management of Lehman.

In September 2007, McGee was reportedly "routinely waiving aside risk limits on all manner of deals". As the 2008 financial crisis intensified and Lehman suffered its first net loss, McGee led the executive committee to convince chairman and CEO Richard Fuld to oust Gregory and CFO Erin Callan; Callan had previously worked under McGee just six months earlier. On June 12, 2008, Gregory was replaced as president and COO by Bart McDade, who had been previously serving as head of Equities.

McGee was involved in negotiations for Lehman with Warren Buffett in March 2008 over a possible investment, and then with Barclays president Robert Diamond regarding a possible merger in September 2008, shortly before Lehman filed for bankruptcy.

=== Barclays ===
McGee joined Barclays Capital as head of Global Investment Banking at the end of that month, and managed the merger of Lehman Brothers' investment bank team into Barclays Capital. He helped Barclays achieve a $3 billion profit in the first quarter of 2009. McGee headed the investment banking executive committee, and reported to Roger Jenkins, chief executive of private equity at Barclays Capital. In 2010, McGee noted that the markets were focusing on "plain vanilla" options rather than "esoteric CDOs."

McGee was promoted to chief executive of Barclays Americas in 2013, in an effort to stem the departure of key staff in New York City. The parent Barclays initially approved high retention pay to keep New York personnel, but in the light of falling profits this caused increasing public criticism in the UK and a shareholder revolt, leading Barclays to rein in bonuses thereafter. In March 2014, McGee earned a $15 million bonus in stock, which was around double of what the Barclays CEO Antony Jenkins received. McGee left Barclays Capital on April 29, 2014, before the Dodd-Frank Act rules (which would have required Barclays to set up a new, New York-based holding company for its American operations) would take effect.

=== Intrepid Financial Partners ===
In May 2015, McGee established Intrepid Financial Partners, a specialist merchant bank that works with companies and investors in the Energy sector to provide merger & acquisition and restructuring advice and make equity and debt investments.

McGee is on the advisory councils of the McCombs School of Business at the University of Texas at Austin, and the Bendheim Center for Finance at Princeton.

== Personal life ==
McGee has three children with his wife Susie.

In 2009, McGee sent a letter, later leaked to the media, to the board of directors at The Kinkaid School, which his son attended, criticizing the school's administration and a teacher for altering a previously planned student pep rally, canceling a skit in which his son would have performed in drag. He also complained that the teacher had made a slur against his profession, upsetting his son.
