= Valukas =

Valukas may refer to:

- Anton R. Valukas (born 1943), American lawyer
  - Report of Anton R. Valukas
- Valuka Iswar, avatar of Shiva
