= Richard S. Fuld Jr. =

American banker (born 1946)

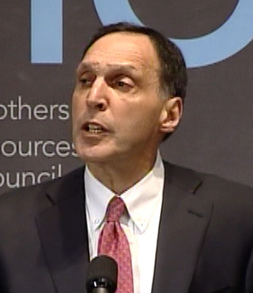
- Born: Richard Severin Fuld Jr. April 26, 1946 (age 80); New York City, U.S.
- Education: University of Colorado (BS); New York University (MBA)
- Predecessor: Peter G. Peterson
- Successor: Position Abolished
- Spouse: Kathleen Ann Bailey
- Children: 3

Richard Severin Fuld Jr. (born April 26, 1946) is an American banker best known as the final chairman and chief executive officer (CEO) of investment bank Lehman Brothers. Fuld held this position from April 1, 1994, after the firm's spinoff from American Express until September 15, 2008. Lehman Brothers filed for bankruptcy protection under Chapter 11 on September 15, 2008, and subsequently announced the sale of major operations to parties including Barclays Bank and Nomura Securities.

Fuld was named in Time's "25 People to Blame for the Financial Crisis" list and in CNN's "Ten Most Wanted: Culprits of the Collapse". Fuld was nicknamed "the gorilla" for his intimidating presence.

== Early life and education ==
Fuld was born to Jewish parents, the son of Richard Severin Fuld Sr. He is a second cousin of professional baseball player and executive Sam Fuld.

He attended Wilbraham & Monson Academy, where he gained his high school diploma.

He received a Bachelor of Science in international business in 1969 from the University of Colorado Boulder, where he participated in the Naval Reserve Officer Training Corps program and was president of the school's chapter of the Alpha Tau Omega fraternity. Fuld completed his M.B.A. at New York University's Stern School of Business in 1973.

Fuld is a member of Kappa Beta Phi.

== Career ==
Fuld's first potential career as an Air Force officer came to an end when he got into a fistfight with an upperclassman cadet commanding officer. He said he had been defending another young cadet who was being taunted by the senior cadet. Fuld then began his career with Lehman Brothers in 1969, the year the firm's senior partner Robert Lehman died. Fuld started trading commercial paper and developed a reputation as an accomplished fixed income trader.

=== Lehman Brothers ===
Fuld worked for Lehman for nearly 40 years. During this time, Fuld witnessed and participated in numerous evolutions within the organization, including its merger with Kuhn, Loeb & Co, its acquisition by American Express, its merger with E.F. Hutton and its ultimate spin-off from American Express in 1994, once again as Lehman Brothers. Once public, the new company traded under the stock ticker LEH.

Fuld was the longest-tenured CEO on Wall Street at the time of the 2008 financial crisis. Fuld had steered Lehman through the 1997 Asian financial crisis, a period where the firm's share price dropped to $12 in 1998. Lehman had a yearly loss of $102 million in 1993, but after Fuld became CEO the firm had 14 straight years of profits, including $4.2 billion in 2007, although in 2008 it reported a Q2 loss of $2.8 billion and filed for bankruptcy later that year. Similar to the fall of Barings Bank, this was accomplished by driving up company earnings through excessive leverage and risk.

Fuld had a succession of "number twos" under him, usually titled as president and chief operating officer (COO). T. Christopher Pettit served until November 26, 1996, when he lost a power struggle with his deputies, likely brought about after Pettit had a mistress, which violated Fuld's unwritten rules on marriage and social etiquette. This president and COO position would remain vacant until Joseph M. Gregory was appointed president and COO in 2002. Bradley Jack and Gregory were appointed co-COOs in 2002, however Jack was demoted to the Office of the chairman in May 2004 and departed in June 2005 with a severance package of $80 million, making Gregory the sole COO and president. Along with chief financial officer (CFO) Erin Callan, Gregory was demoted on June 12, 2008, and replaced by Bart McDade, who would see Lehman through bankruptcy.

In 2006, Institutional Investor magazine named Fuld America's top chief executive in the private sector. That same year in December, Fuld told The Wall Street Journal, "as long as I am alive this firm will never be sold."

In March 2008, Fuld appeared in Barron's list of the 30 best CEOs and was dubbed "Mr. Wall Street".

Overall, Fuld received nearly half a billion dollars in total compensation from 1993 to 2007. In 2007, he was paid a total of $22,030,534, which included a base salary of $750,000, a cash bonus of $4,250,000, and stock grants of $16,877,365. According to Bloomberg Businessweek, Fuld "famously demanded loyalty of everyone around him and demonstrated his own by keeping much of his wealth tied up in the firm", even buying Lehman shares on margin, according to a friend.

=== Lehman Brothers bankruptcy and aftermath ===
Fuld was initially praised for handling the initial subprime mortgage crisis well, better than any of the other bulge bracket firms, behind Goldman Sachs.

Fuld was said to have underestimated the downturn in the US housing market and its effect on Lehman's mortgage bond underwriting business. Fuld was already the longest-tenured CEO on Wall Street and kept his job as the subprime mortgage crisis took hold, while CEOs of rivals like Bear Stearns, Merrill Lynch, and Citigroup were forced to resign. In addition, Lehman's board of directors, which included retired CEOs like Vodafone's Christopher Gent and IBM's John Akers, were reluctant to challenge Fuld as the firm's share price spiraled lower.

Fuld was criticized for not completing several proposed deals, either a capital injection or a merger, that would have saved Lehman Brothers from bankruptcy. Interested parties had included Warren Buffett and the Korea Development Bank. Fuld was said to have played a game of brinkmanship, refusing to accept offers that could have rescued the firm because they didn't reflect the value he saw in the bank.

However, New York magazine had a different view on Fuld's last three months as CEO before the firm's bankruptcy. Hugh "Skip" McGee III, then-head of the Investment Banking Division, had earlier disagreed with COO Joseph M. Gregory's appointment of one of his subordinates, Erin Callan, as CFO. On June 11, 2008, McGee organized a meeting of the firm's senior bankers, who forced Fuld to demote Callan and Gregory. Gregory's replacement as president and COO was Bart McDade. Although Fuld remained CEO in title, it has been said that a management coup had taken place and the person in charge then was McDade. New York magazine's account also stated that Fuld was desperately searching for a buyer during the summer and even offering to step aside as CEO to facilitate the sale of the firm, being quoted as saying, "We have two priorities, that the Lehman name and brand survive and that as many employees as possible be saved and you'll notice our priority isn't price".

In his 2009 book A Colossal Failure Of Common Sense, Larry McDonald—a senior Lehman Brothers trader in the years leading up to the crash—wrote that Fuld's "smoldering envy" of Goldman Sachs and other Wall Street rivals led him to ignore warnings from Lehman executives about the impending crash and that Fuld insisted the firm's chief risk officer leave the boardroom during key discussions.

In October 2008, Fuld was among 12 Lehman Brothers executives who received grand jury subpoenas in connection to three criminal investigations led by the United States Attorney's offices in the Eastern and Southern Districts of New York, as well as the District of New Jersey, related to the alleged securities fraud associated with the collapse of the firm.

On October 6, 2008, Fuld testified before the United States House Committee on Oversight and Government Reform regarding the causes and effects of the bankruptcy of Lehman Brothers. During the testimony, Fuld was asked if he wondered why Lehman Brothers was the only firm that was allowed to fail, to which he responded: "Until the day they put me in the ground, I will wonder."

The Report of Anton R. Valukas, the official court-mandated investigation into the Lehman bankruptcy, concluded that "While the business decisions that brought about the crisis were largely within the realm of acceptable business judgement, the actions to manipulate financial statements do give rise to 'colorable claims', especially against the CEO and CFOs but also against the auditors. In the opinion of the Examiner, 'colorable' is generally meant to mean that sufficient evidence exists to support legal action and possible recovery of losses." "Regarding liquidity, throughout 2008 Lehman made false claims of having billions of dollars in available cash to repay counterparties when in reality, significant portions of the reported amounts were in fact encumbered or otherwise unavailable for use. On September 12, 2008, two days after reporting $41 billion in liquidity, true available funds totaled only $2 billion." Lehman filed for bankruptcy on September 15.

=== After Lehman Brothers ===
On November 10, 2008, Fuld transferred his Florida mansion to his wife Kathleen for $100. They had bought it four years earlier for $13.75 million.

In March 2009, Fuld sent out an email stating that he had joined Matrix Advisors in New York City.

In May 2010, Fuld was registered by the Financial Industry Regulatory Authority (FINRA) as employed by Legend Securities, a securities brokerage and investment banking firm in New York. Fuld left the firm in early 2012.

By July 2015, Matrix Advisors, led by Fuld, had grown to about two dozen employees. The firm focuses on small and medium-sized enterprises, advising clients on a range of matters, from opening product distribution channels to completing mergers and acquisitions, and sourcing private equity and venture capital funding. By 2016, Matrix Private Capital LLC had $100 million in assets under management from 18 families. By November 2017, the company had expanded by opening offices in Los Angeles and Palm Beach.

Also in mid-2015, Fuld put up for auction his 71-acre estate in Sun Valley, Idaho. The property was estimated to sell for $30 to $50 million in August 2015, but sold at an auction in September for just over $20 million.

As of 2018, Fuld remained critical of the government's decision not to bail out Lehman despite bailing out other financial firms in distress. Fuld reserves his most pointed criticisms for his longtime rival, Henry Paulson, who ran Goldman Sachs Group Inc. before heading the U.S. Treasury during the 2008 financial crisis. By 2018, almost all claims brought against Lehman since the bankruptcy had been resolved (with $4.1 billion remaining from $1.2 trillion).

In a 2018 book on the subject, The Fed and Lehman Brothers: Setting the Record Straight on a Financial Disaster, economist Laurence M. Ball argues that Lehman had ample collateral to justify a U.S. government loan that would have staved off bankruptcy, rejecting statements from former officials that such a bailout would have been illegal. The Report of Anton R. Valukas, however, established that Lehman's assets were shrouded in uncertainty around the time of the bankruptcy, due to extensive balance sheet manipulation and accounting fraud.

== Accolades and directorships ==
In 2006, Fuld was named No. 1 CEO in the Brokers & Asset Managers category, by Institutional Investor magazine. In 2007 he received a $22 million bonus.

In October 2008, CNN named Fuld as one of the "Ten Most Wanted: Culprits of the Collapse" regarding the 2008 financial crisis; he was placed 9th on the list.

In December 2008, Fuld was given the "Lex Overpaid CEO" award of the Financial Times for having received $34 million in 2007 and $40.5 million in 2006, the last two years before his bank's failure. The total compensation he received from 2000 until the bankruptcy was $484 million.

Fuld was named in Time's "25 People to Blame for the Financial Crisis" list.

Fuld at one time served on the board of directors of the Federal Reserve Bank of New York, a position he ceased holding shortly before the bankruptcy of Lehman Brothers. He is a member of the International Business Council of the World Economic Forum and the Business Council. He also serves on the Board of Trustees of New York-Presbyterian Hospital. He was also on the board of directors of the Robin Hood Foundation but was removed from the Board following the Lehman Brothers bankruptcy.

== In popular culture ==
- Richard Fuld was portrayed by Corey Johnson in the 2009 BBC film The Last Days of Lehman Brothers.
- Richard Fuld was portrayed by James Woods in the 2011 HBO film Too Big To Fail.
- Fuld also appeared in the 2010 documentary Inside Job.
- In October 2011, a theatrical film titled Margin Call was released, depicting a bank loosely based on Lehman Brothers. Jeremy Irons portrayed "John Tuld", a character inspired, in part, by Fuld.
- Fuld is featured in Mary Kathryn Nagle's play Manahatta, which juxtaposes the financial crisis collapse of Lehman Brothers with the displacement of the Lenape people from New York in the 17th century.
