= Michael Ainslie =

American businessman

- Born: c. 1945
- Known for: Former CEO of Sotheby's (1984-1994)
- Spouse: Suzanne
- Children: 1 daughter 1 son

Michael Ainslie (born c. 1945) is an American businessman. He served as the president and chief executive officer of Sotheby's from 1984 to 1994. He was a director of Lehman Brothers from 1996 to its 2008 bankruptcy, and oversaw "the sale and disposition of the company's remaining assets" by 2010. He is the former chairman of the Posse Foundation and the former president of the National Trust for Historic Preservation.
