= Hudson Castle Group =

Independent financial company

Hudson Castle Group Inc. is a private, independent company formed in 1996 and is a leading provider of debt financing to the global financial institutions sector. Hudson Castle’s target market includes leading commercial banks, investment banks and insurance companies in the U.S. and Western Europe. The firm does not seek publicity and the makeup of its management team is unknown.

Hudson Castle is in the business of arranging financing for its clients based principally on the creditworthiness of those clients. The financing is typically arranged through special-purpose finance companies and sold as investment-grade rated short-term debt by registered Wall Street broker dealers to sophisticated institutional investors in the capital markets. Every financing transaction that Hudson Castle arranges is pre-reviewed by credit rating agencies (each, a Nationally Recognized Statistical Rating Organization ("NRSRO")) that provide ratings to the special-purpose finance companies. Each of the special-purpose finance companies are administered by Deutsche Bank Trust Company Americas.

Like most of its competitors, the firm registered and participated in the Commercial Paper Funding Facility that was put in place by the Federal Reserve Bank of New York on October 27, 2008, to bail out firms endangered by the financial crisis. Hudson Castle-sponsored special-purpose finance companies combined were the 4th largest borrower under the Fed's program, receiving $53.3 billion of taxpayer's money, all of which was repaid.

== Relationship with Lehman Brothers ==
In 2001, Lehman Brothers became a minority investor in IBEX Capital Markets, Incorporated (predecessor to Hudson Castle) joining 27 other shareholders, including two other publicly traded financial services companies, private institutional investors, high-net-worth individuals and employees. In 2001, Lehman employees held a third of Hudson Castle’s board seats and so controlled the firm. The remaining seats were held by representatives of the other shareholders and 2 independent directors. By 2002, Lehman’s representation on the board was reduced and after 2004 Lehman never registered more than one vote at board meetings.

In 2002, Kyle Miller, a managing director at Lehman, resigned with two others and was hired by IBEX as its CEO and president. Shortly thereafter IBEX’s name was changed to Hudson Castle and the team of new and former IBEX employees (13 employees in total) moved the company from Boston to New York.

Between 2001 and 2004, the business activities of Hudson Castle were controlled by Lehman. By 2004, as was cited by Anton Valukas, the examiner of the Lehman bankruptcy estate, Hudson Castle “to our knowledge … had become … independent of Lehman.” After 2004, as quoted in an April 13, 2010 New York Times article, “all funding decisions at Hudson Castle were solely made by the management team and neither the board of directors nor Lehman Brothers participated in or influenced those decisions in any way….”

The April 2010 New York Times article reported that Hudson Castle was “used to move risky investments off their (Lehman’s) books to improve Lehman’s appearance of financial health” in the months leading to Lehman’s bankruptcy. However, in the same article, the New York Times reported that the examiner’s report (Anton Valukas) “did not say that Hudson was involved in the misleading accounting.” Furthermore, the transaction between Hudson Castle and Lehman cited in the New York Times article was later revealed in court documents to have been recorded on Lehman’s books as a financing transaction, and was not an off-balance sheet transaction, refuting the New York Times' claims.

On April 14, 2010, The New York Post reported that the U.S. Securities and Exchange Commission had launched an investigation into Lehman Brothers amid reports that Lehman Brothers had “shunted billions to….Hudson Castle in order to pretty up its books.” The Wall Street Journal later reported on March 12, 2011, that the commission’s probe into Lehman’s accounting treatment had stalled. In the same article, Ernst & Young said the firm “stands behind our work on the Lehman audit and our opinion that Lehman's financial statements were fairly stated in accordance with the U.S. accounting standards that existed at the time."

Lehman’s stake in Hudson Castle was managed by Alvarez and Marsal after the collapse of Lehman. Hudson Castle repurchased Lehman’s stake in June 2009.

== See also ==
- Bankruptcy of Lehman Brothers
