= Petit Saint Vincent =

Island in St. Vincent and the Grenadines

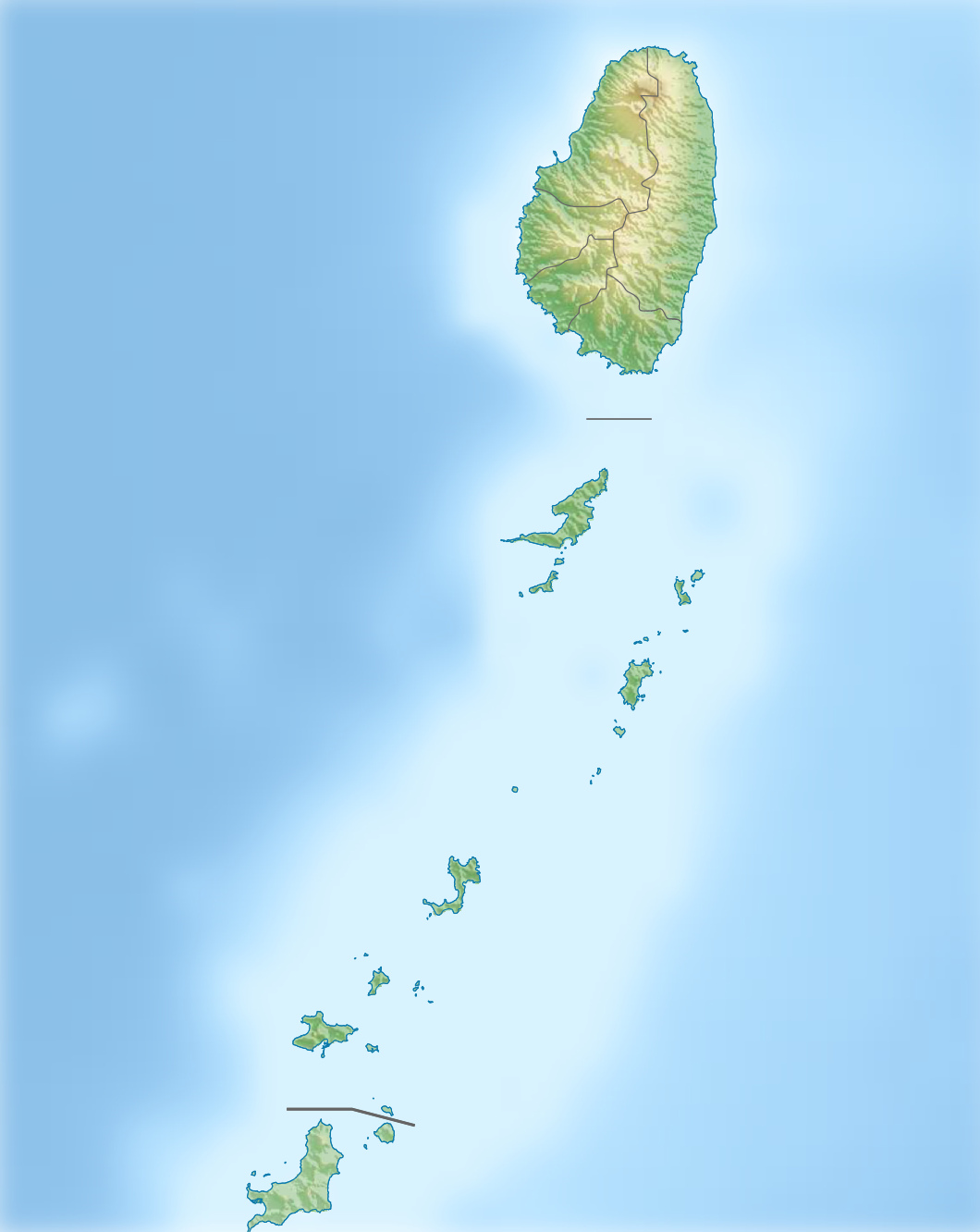
- Location within Saint Vincent and the Grenadines Location within Lesser Antilles Location within the Caribbean

Geography
- Location: Caribbean
- Coordinates: 12°32′15″N 61°23′02″W
- Archipelago: Grenadines
- Area: 0.2 sq mi (0.52 km^{2})

Administration
- Saint Vincent and the Grenadines

Additional information
- Time zone: AST (UTC-4)
Petit St Vincent
- Private Island
- Interactive map of Petit St Vincent
- Island chain: The Grenadines
- Owner: Philip Stephenson
Population
  - Total: 130 staff
- Website: Petit St. Vincent

Petit St Vincent, known locally as PSV, is an island 40 miles (64 km) south of St. Vincent in the Grenadine islands. It is the southernmost island in Saint Vincent and the Grenadines. The island is privately owned and operates as a resort. The resort has 22 one- and two-bedroom cottages and villas. Since 2013, it has been a part of the Small Luxury Hotels of the World hotel chain.

== Location ==
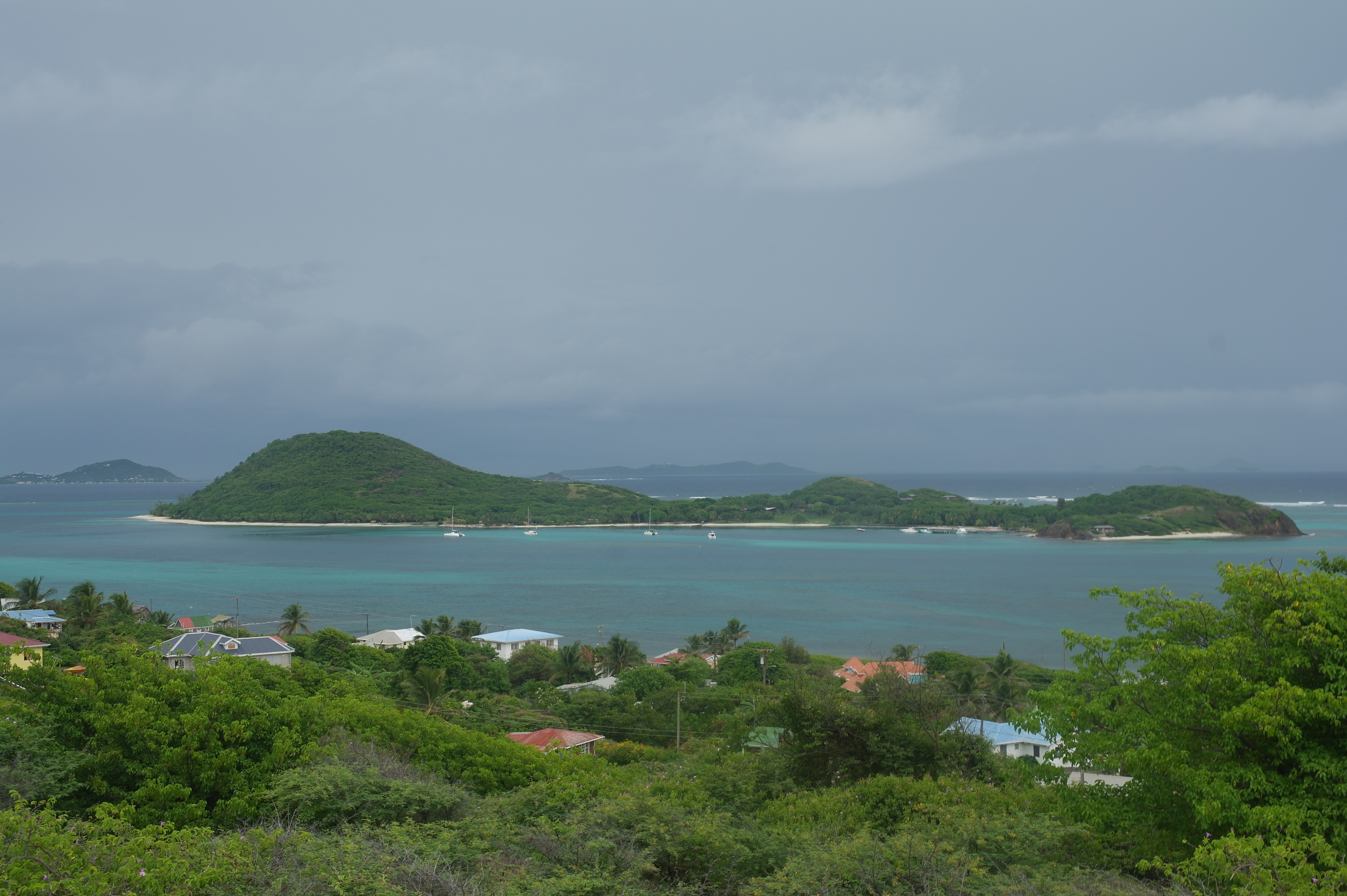
View of Petit Saint Vincent from Petite Martinique in Grenada.

Petit St Vincent is located in the southern part of the Grenadines island chain, to the north of Carriacou and Petite Martinique and south of Palm Islands and Union Island.

== Geography ==
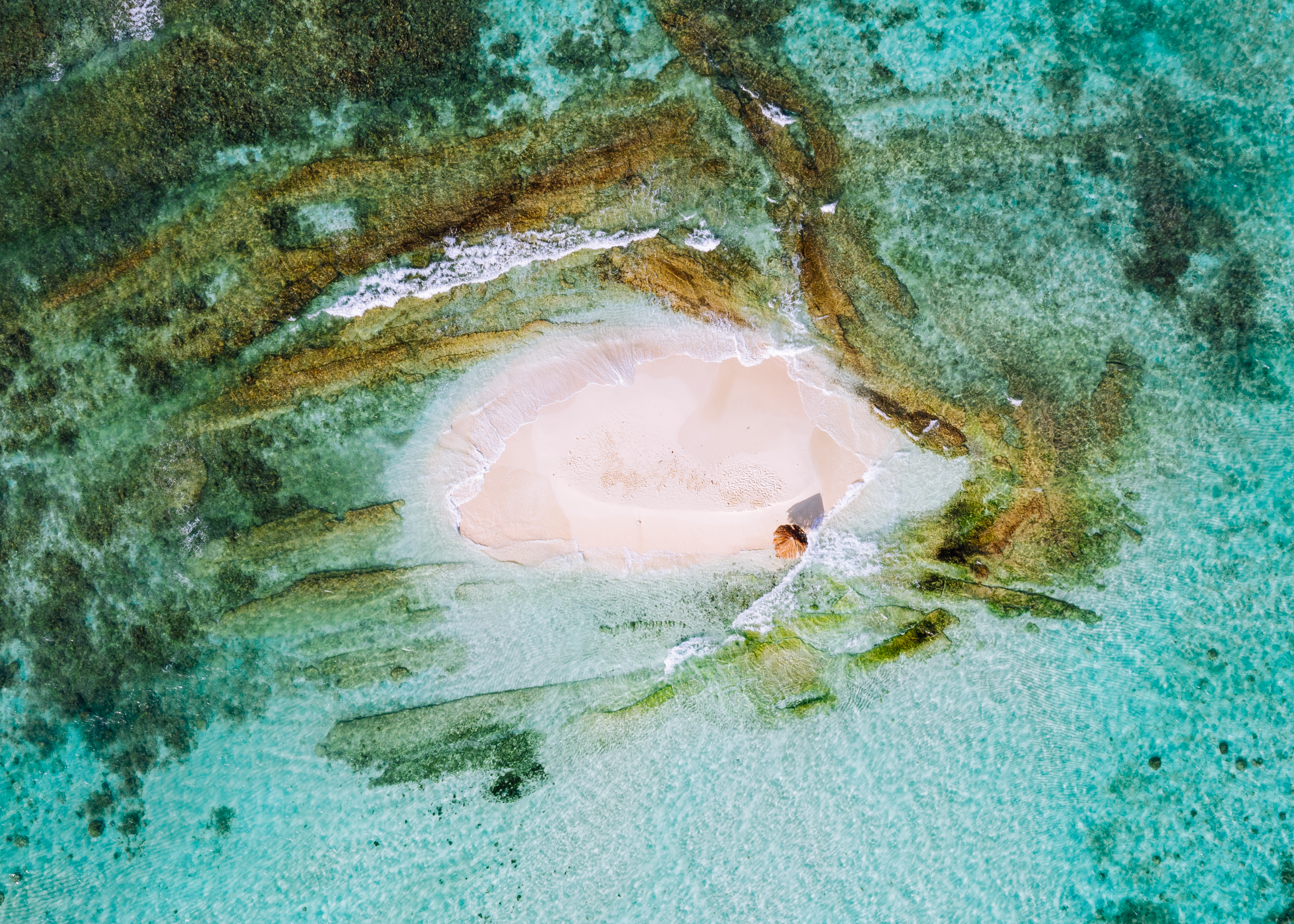
Aerial view of shoal Mopion.

PSV is surrounded by two miles (3.2 km) of white sand beaches. Inland, the terrain consists of gently rolling hills and tropical woodland, amid which the resort's accommodation is built. The highest point on the island is on Marni Hill to the northwest of the island, which is 275 feet (84 m) above sea level. The Grenadines are marginally drier and warmer than St. Vincent to the north, with the average daily temperature being between 29 and 30 °C (84 and 86 °F) all year round, due to the island chain's proximity to the equator.

== History ==
The island is privately owned. In 1963 Haze Richardson and Doug Terman chartered their 77’ schooner Jacinta to Mr. H.W. Nichols Jr. and family. During this three-week cruise, Mr. Nichols expressed interest in purchasing an island and building a small hotel. Richardson and Terman concentrated their search on the Grenadines island chain, eventually arranging the purchase of Petit St. Vincent from a woman on Petit Martinique. The two men oversaw the construction of the 22 cottage resort on the behalf of Nichols, who asked Richardson to stay on as manager. Richardson accepted this offer and never left the island, becoming owner after Nichols’ death in 1985.

Richardson died in a swimming accident in Costa Rica in 2008. His wife, Lynn Richardson, continued to manage the resort until November 2010, when it was announced that the island had been sold to Freedom Resorts Ltd., operated by business partners Phil Stephenson (majority owner) and Robin Paterson. Improvements made by this group include renovations to the cottages, a new beach bar and restaurant, and a spa.

The Petit St. Vincent resort contains 22 cottages, as well as a spa and a dive center in the 115-acre area. Food services are provided by the Main Pavilion Restaurant and Bar and the nearby Beach Restaurant with the adjacent Goatie's Bar. The diving center on the island was opened by Jean Michel Cousteau in 2014.

In 2019, Petit St. Vincent was purchased by the American designer and real estate entrepreneur Tanja Ellis. Ellis has acquired several other hotels and islands throughout the Caribbean.

=== Hurricane Beryl ===
On July 1, 2024, Hurricane Beryl, a Category 5 storm, pummeled the Grenadines and the surrounding area. Petit St. Vincent was hit hard, sustaining significant damage. The resort is currently undergoing restoration and redevelopment and aims to reopen in 2026.
