= Aurora Bank =

Federal savings bank headquartered in Wilmington, Delaware, US

- Industry: Banking; Financial services
- Founded: 1921; 105 years ago, in Wilmington, Delaware
- Defunct: 2013 (bank); 2020 (holding company)
- Fate: Liquidation
- Headquarters: Brandywine Building, 1000 West Street, Wilmington, Delaware, U.S.
- Products: Consumer Banking; Mortgage Loans; Commercial Services; Business Services
- Number of employees: 1,900 (2010)
- Parent: Lehman Brothers

Aurora Bank was a federal savings bank (FSB) headquartered in Wilmington, Delaware, established in 1921 under the name Delaware Savings And Loan Association. It reorganized as an FSB in 1988 and became a subsidiary of Lehman Brothers in 1999, renamed as Lehman Brothers Bank. The bank spearheaded Lehman's mortgage loan business while continuing to offer retail deposit accounts.

After the 2008 failure of its parent company the bank continued to operate, but its capital position deteriorated rapidly due to depositor withdrawals. The Office of Thrift Supervision imposed special restrictions on its business and the Lehman bankruptcy estate invested hundreds of millions of dollars to prevent its failure. It changed its name to Aurora Bank and, in 2012, exited the banking business by selling most assets and insured deposits to New York Community Bank and most loan servicing interests to Nationstar Mortgage and Selene Finance. The following year it relinquished its banking charter and relocated to Littleton, Colorado.

The company remained a party in litigation relating to its loan origination practices under Lehman Brothers, and in 2018 it paid a $41 million civil penalty to the federal government to settle claims that it had misrepresented the quality of its loans. It entered liquidation in September 2020.
