= Bart McDade =

Business executive

- Born: Herbert H. McDade III
- Education: BA, Duke University; MBA, University of Michigan
- Occupation(s): President and COO of Lehman Brothers at bankruptcy

Herbert "Bart" H. McDade III is an American businessman who was the President and COO of Lehman Brothers at the time of its bankruptcy. During the end of Lehman's existence, McDade was tasked with largely running the firm and saving it as the then CEO, Richard Fuld was largely sidelined.

== Personal life ==
McDade received a Bachelor of Arts from Duke University and a Master of Business Administration from the University of Michigan. As of April 2010, he was married to Martha McDade, a civil engineer working in sustainable architecture.

== Career ==
McDade joined Lehman in 1983 in corporate bond trading. He was named head of the firm's corporate bond department in 1991. In 1998, he was named global head of Debt Capital Markets and a member of the Investment Banking division's group head committee. In 2000, in addition to being appointed co-head of the firm's Global Fixed Income division, McDade was named to the firm's Operating Committee. McDade served as co-head of the Fixed Income division from 2000 to 2002 and as global head of the Fixed Income division from 2002 to 2005. He then served as global head of the Equities division from June 2005.

On June 12, 2008, Lehman chief operating officer Joseph M. Gregory was removed from his position shortly after it was announced Lehman would post an unexpectedly large second-quarter loss of nearly US$3 billion (equivalent to about $4.4B in 2024). As part of the reshuffling, McDade was named COO and President. Lehman Brothers filed for bankruptcy protection three months later, on September 15, 2008.

McDade was one of a handful of top Lehman executives offered a job at Barclays after the British bank bought Lehman's U.S. operations when Lehman declared bankruptcy in September 2008. However, he stepped down from his position at Barclays in November 2008, after less than two months helping Barclays integrate Lehman Brothers' investment banking arm into its operations.
