= Repo 105 =

Accounting maneuver used by Lehman Brothers

Repo 105 is Lehman Brothers' name for an accounting maneuver that it used where a short-term repurchase agreement is classified as a sale. The cash obtained through this "sale" is then used to pay down debt, allowing the company to appear to reduce its leverage by temporarily paying down liabilities—just long enough to reflect on the company's published balance sheet. After the company's financial reports are published, the company borrows cash and repurchases its original assets.

== Use by Lehman Brothers ==
Repo 105 was used by investment bank Lehman Brothers three times according to a March 2010 report by the bankruptcy court examiner. The report stated that Lehman's auditors, Ernst & Young, were aware of this questionable classification. Law firm Linklaters has received unfavorable press treatment in relation to their issuance of an English law opinion which characterized the arrangements as a true sale as opposed to a transfer by Lehman with a charge back in favor of the transferor. Apparently, the use of the British law firm was necessitated by the fact no law firm in the US was prepared to give a legal opinion on the legality of the use of Repo 105.

=== Examiner's report ===
The report published, on March 11, 2010, was titled "Lehman Brothers Holdings Inc. Chapter 11 Proceedings". The Examiner in this matter was Anton R. Valukas, Chairman of Jenner & Block. The report details the use of both "repo 105" and "repo 108" which are identical procedures, the first costing 4.76% and the second 7.41% of the assets exchanged. In other words, assets valued at 105 will produce 100 in cash, assets valued at 108 will produce 100 in cash respectively.

After the Examiner's report was published, the Securities and Exchange Commission (SEC) sent letters to chief financial officers of nearly two dozen large financial and insurance companies asking about their firms' use of repurchase agreements, including the number and amount of such agreements that qualify for sales accounting, and detailed analysis of why such transactions can be treated as sales. SEC chairman, Mary Schapiro, indicated that the agency was trying to determine whether other companies used similar techniques as the "repo 105" used by Lehman Brothers.

=== Fraud charges ===
In response to the report, the auditors said that the transactions were accounted for in line with Generally Accepted Accounting Principles. However, New York attorney general Andrew Cuomo filed charges against Ernst & Young in December 2010, alleging that the firm "substantially assisted... a massive accounting fraud" by approving the accounting treatment, seeking $150 million. The suit was eventually settled in 2015 for $10 million (most of which was to be paid to Lehman bondholders), without E&Y admitting any wrongdoing. The Wall Street Journal drew attention to the increasing levels of fees that Ernst & Young had been paid by Lehman from 2001 to 2008.

== Review of accounting treatment ==
The IASB and FASB, senior bodies responsible for setting accounting standards, met in April 2010 to review the accounting treatment for such repo transactions.

== Comparison to tobashi schemes ==
Several writers have stated that Repo 105 was essentially a tobashi scheme.

== See also ==
- Repurchase agreement
- Report of Anton R. Valukas
