= Lehman Brothers =

1850–2008 American financial services firm

Lehman Brothers Holdings Inc.

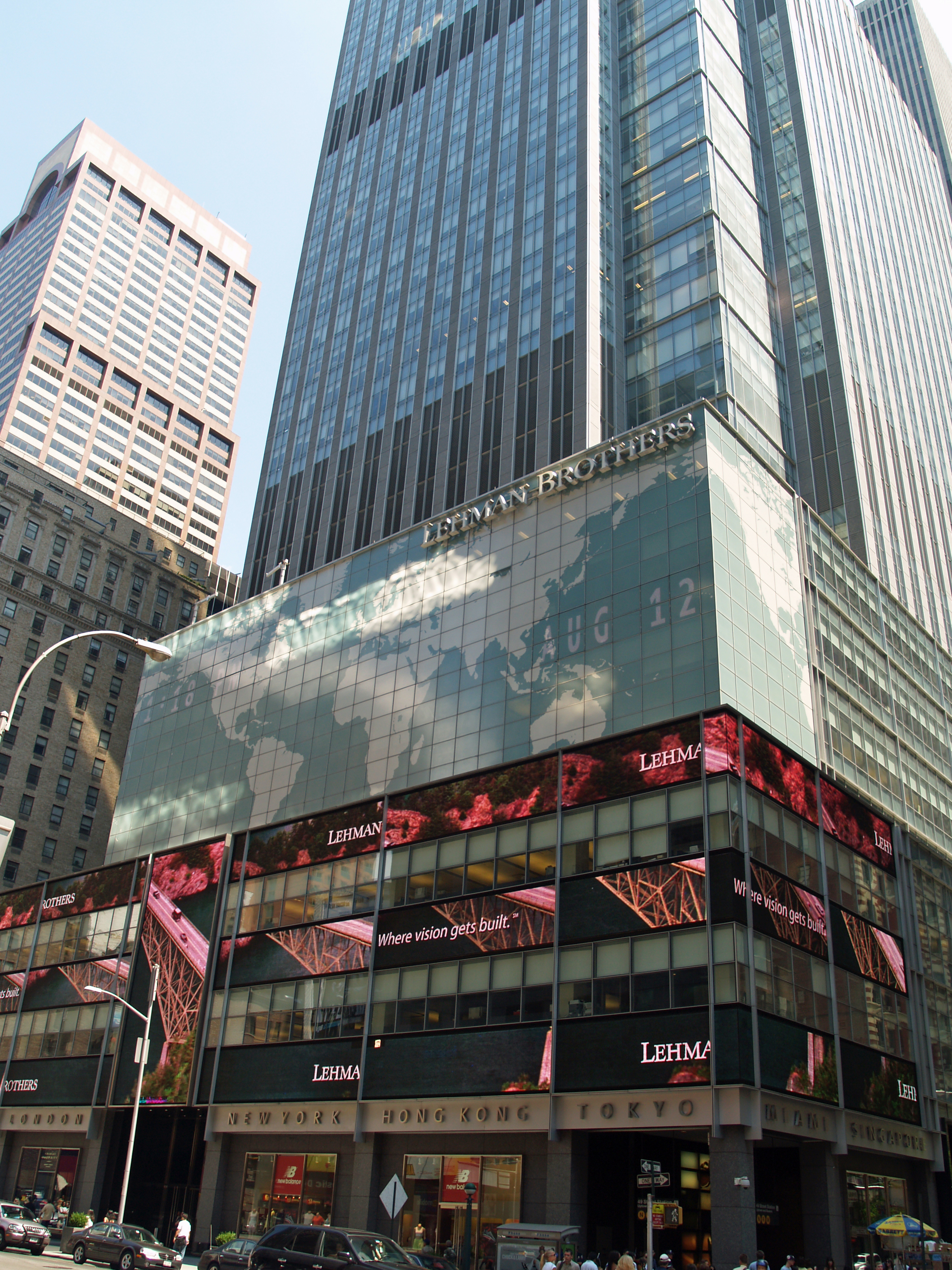
- Lehman Brothers headquarters in Times Square, a year before the company's collapse
- Trade name: Lehman Brothers
- Type: Public
- Traded as: NYSE: LEH; OTC Pink: LEHMQ
- Industry: Investment services
- Predecessor: H. Lehman and Bro.
- Founded: 1850; 176 years ago Montgomery, Alabama, U.S.
- Founders: Henry, Emanuel and Mayer Lehman
- Defunct: September 15, 2008; 18 years ago
- Fate: Chapter 11 bankruptcy Liquidation
- Successors: Nomura Holdings; Barclays
- Headquarters: 745 Seventh Avenue, New York City, United States
- Area served: Worldwide
- Key people: Robert Lehman; Pete Peterson; Richard Fuld
- Products: Financial services; Investment banking; Investment management
- Number of employees: 26,200 (2008)
- Subsidiaries: Lehman Brothers Inc., Neuberger Berman Inc., Aurora Loan Services, LLC, SIB Mortgage Corporation, Lehman Brothers Bank, FSB, Eagle Energy Partners, and the Crossroads Group
- Website: lehman.com

Lehman Brothers Holdings Inc. (/ˈliːmən/ LEE-mən) was an American global financial services firm founded in 1850. Before filing for bankruptcy in 2008, Lehman was the fourth-largest investment bank in the United States (behind Goldman Sachs, Morgan Stanley, and Merrill Lynch), with about 25,000 employees worldwide. It operated its business in investment banking, equity, fixed-income and derivatives sales and trading (especially U.S. Treasury securities), research, investment management, private equity, and private banking. Lehman was operational for 158 years from its founding in 1850 until 2008.

On September 15, 2008, Lehman Brothers filed for Chapter 11 bankruptcy protection following the exodus of most of its clients, drastic declines in its stock price, and the devaluation of assets by credit rating agencies. The collapse was largely due to Lehman's involvement in the subprime mortgage crisis and its exposure to less liquid assets. Lehman's bankruptcy filing is the largest in US history, having beaten the previous record holder Worldcom, Inc., and is thought to have played a major role in the unfolding of the 2008 financial crisis. The market collapse also gave support to the "too big to fail" doctrine.

After Lehman Brothers filed for bankruptcy, global markets immediately plummeted. The following day, major British bank Barclays announced its agreement to purchase, subject to regulatory approval, a significant and controlling interest in Lehman's North American investment-banking and trading divisions, along with its New York headquarters building. On September 20, 2008, a revised version of that agreement was approved by U.S. bankruptcy court judge James M. Peck. The next week, Nomura Holdings announced that it would acquire Lehman Brothers' franchise in the Asia–Pacific region, including Japan, Hong Kong and Australia, as well as Lehman Brothers' investment banking and equities businesses in Europe and the Middle East. The deal became effective on October 13, 2008.

== History ==
=== Under the Lehman family (1850–1969) ===
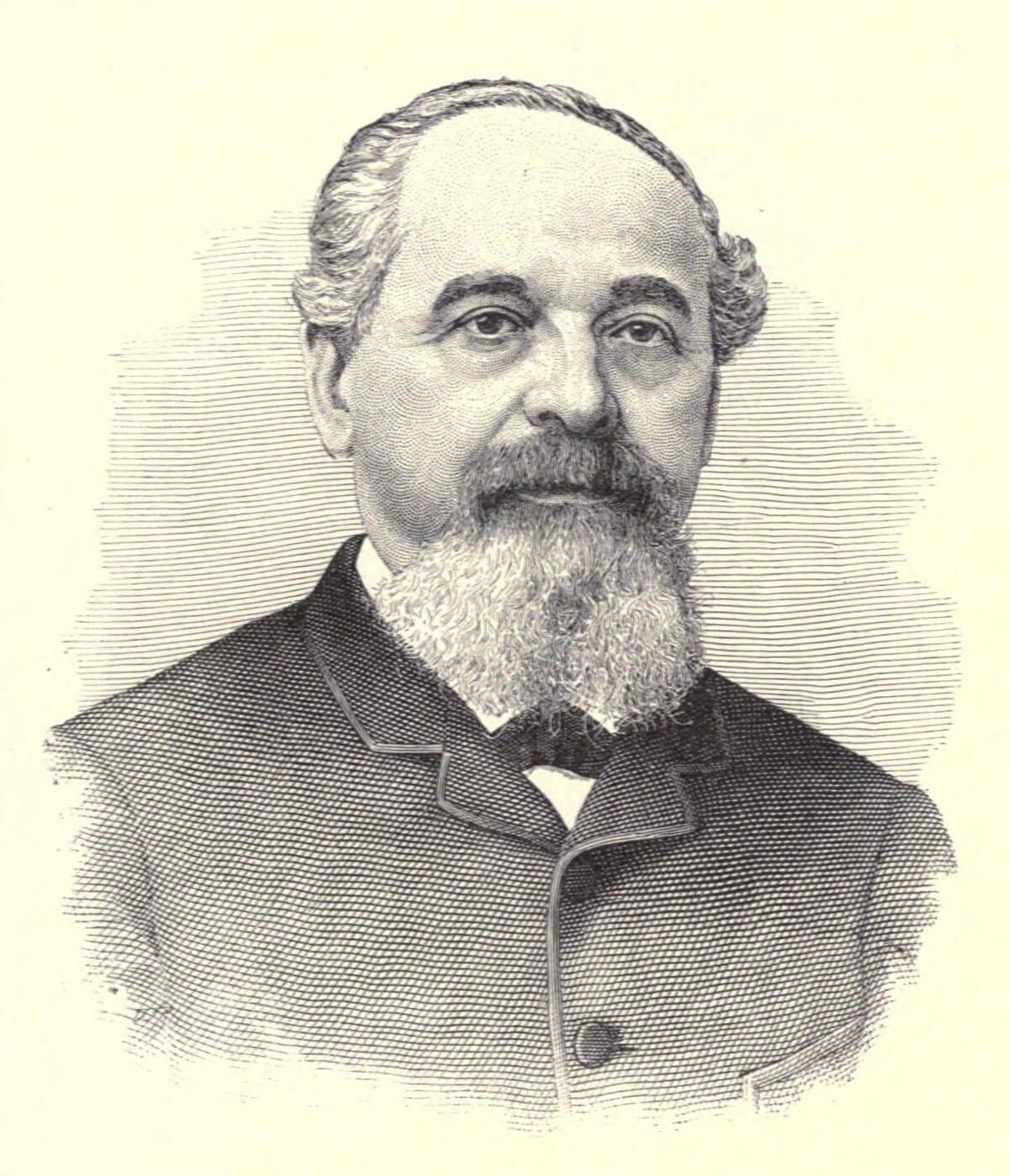
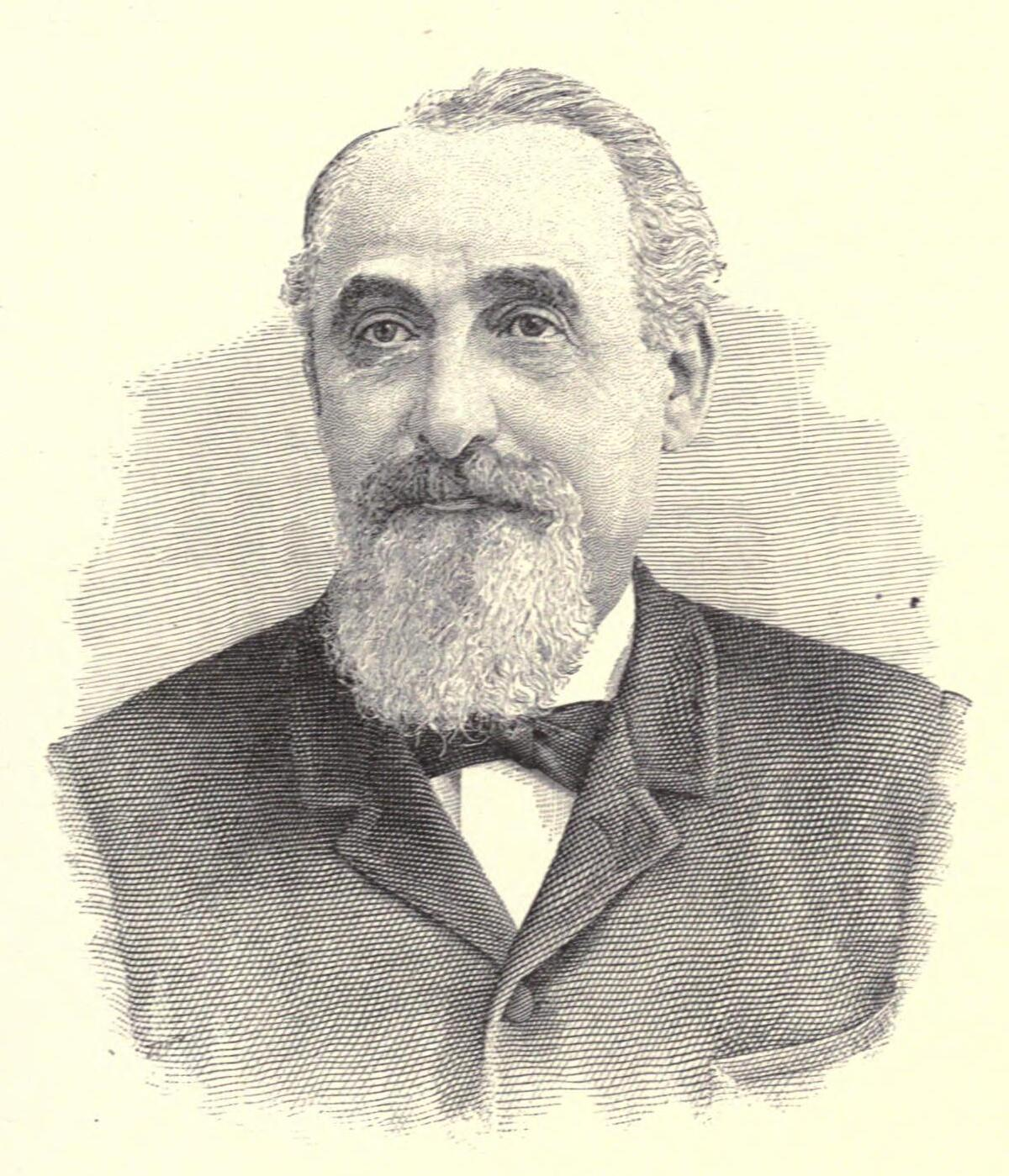
Engravings of Emanuel (left) and Mayer Lehman (right) published 1895

In 1844, 23-year-old Hayum Lehmann, the son of a Jewish cattle merchant, immigrated to the United States from Rimpar, Bavaria. He changed his name to "Henry Lehman" and settled in Montgomery, Alabama, where he opened a dry-goods store, "H. Lehman". In 1847, following the arrival of his brother Emanuel Lehman, the firm became "H. Lehman and Bro." With the arrival of their youngest brother, Mayer Lehman, in 1850, the firm changed its name again and "Lehman Brothers" was founded.

Cotton was one of the most important crops in the United States in the mid-19th century, and it was Alabama's highest-grossing cash crop. Before the American Civil War, nearly all U.S. cotton was produced by forced slave labor. In the 1860 U.S. census, slaves made up nearly 45 percent of Alabama's population. The 1860 census listed Mayer Lehman as the owner of seven enslaved people ("three males and four females ranging in age from 5 to 50").

Capitalizing on cotton's high market value, the three Lehman brothers began to accept raw cotton from forced labor plantations as payment for merchandise. They eventually began a second business trading in cotton. Within a few years, it grew to become the most significant part of their operation. Following Henry's death from yellow fever in 1855, the remaining brothers continued to focus on their commodities-trading/brokerage operations.

By 1858, the center of cotton trading had shifted from the South to New York City, where cotton factors and commission houses were based. Lehman opened its first branch office at 119 Liberty Street, and 32-year-old Emanuel relocated there to run the office. In 1862, facing difficulties as a result of the Civil War, the firm teamed up with a cotton merchant named John Durr to form Lehman, Durr & Co. Following the war the company helped finance Alabama's reconstruction. The firm's headquarters was eventually moved to New York City, where it helped found the New York Cotton Exchange in 1870, commodifying the crop; Emanuel sat on the board of governors until 1884. The firm also dealt in the emerging market for railroad bonds and entered the financial-advisory business.

Lehman became a member of the Coffee Exchange as early as 1883 and finally the New York Stock Exchange in 1887. In 1899, it underwrote its first public offering, the preferred and common stock of the International Steam Pump Company.

Despite the offering of International Steam, the firm's real shift from being a commodities house to a house of issue did not begin until 1906. In that year, under Emanuel's son Philip Lehman, the firm partnered with Goldman, Sachs & Co., to bring the General Cigar Co. to market, followed closely by Sears, Roebuck and Company. Among these were F.W. Woolworth Company, May Department Stores Company, Gimbel Brothers, Inc., R.H. Macy & Company, The Studebaker Corporation, the B.F. Goodrich Co., and Endicott Johnson Corporation.

Following Philip Lehman's retirement in 1925, his son Robert "Bobbie" Lehman took over as head of the firm. During Bobbie's tenure, the company weathered the capital crisis of the Great Depression by focusing on venture capital while the equities market recovered.

In 1924, John M. Hancock became the first non-family member to join the firm, followed by Monroe C. Gutman and Paul Mazur, who became partners in 1927. By 1928, the firm had moved to its One William Street location.

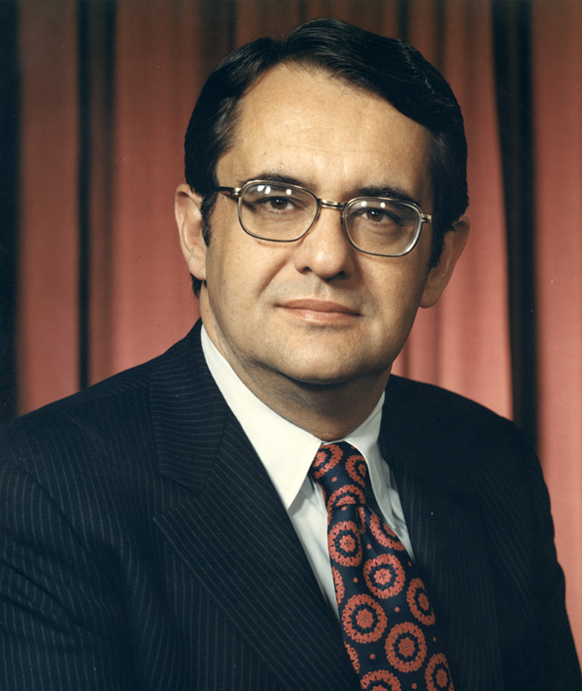
Pete Peterson

In the 1930s, Lehman underwrote the initial public offering of the first television manufacturer, DuMont Laboratories, and helped fund the Radio Corporation of America (RCA). It also helped finance the rapidly growing oil industry, including the companies Halliburton and Kerr-McGee. In the 1950s, Lehman underwrote the IPO of Digital Equipment Corporation. Later, it arranged the acquisition of Digital by Compaq.

=== An evolving partnership (1969–1984) ===
Robert Lehman died in 1969 after 44 years in a leadership position for the firm, leaving no member of the Lehman family actively involved with the partnership. At the same time, Lehman was facing strong headwinds amidst the difficult economic environment of the early 1970s. By 1972, the firm was facing hard times and in 1973, Pete Peterson, chairman and chief executive officer of the Bell & Howell Corporation, was brought in to save the firm.

Under Peterson's leadership as chairman and CEO, the firm acquired Abraham & Co. in 1975, and two years later merged with Kuhn, Loeb & Co., to form Lehman Brothers, Kuhn, Loeb Inc., the country's fourth-largest investment bank, behind Salomon Brothers, Goldman Sachs and First Boston. Peterson led the firm from significant operating losses to five consecutive years of record profits with a return on equity among the highest in the investment-banking industry.

By the early 1980s, hostilities between the firm's investment bankers and traders prompted Peterson to promote Lewis Glucksman, the firm's President, COO and former trader, to be his co-CEO in May 1983. Glucksman introduced a number of changes that had the effect of increasing tensions, which when coupled with Glucksman's management style and a downturn in the markets, resulted in a power struggle that ousted Peterson and left Glucksman as the sole CEO.

Upset bankers, who had soured over the power struggle, left the company. Stephen A. Schwarzman, chairman of the firm's M&A committee, recalled in a February 2003 interview with Private Equity International that "Lehman Brothers had an extremely competitive internal environment, which ultimately became dysfunctional." The company suffered under the disintegration, and Glucksman was pressured into selling the firm.

=== Merger with American Express (1984–1994) ===
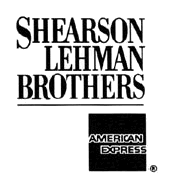
Shearson Lehman/American Express logo

Shearson/American Express, an American Express-owned securities company focused on brokerage rather than investment banking, acquired Lehman in 1984, for $360 million. On May 11, the combined firms became Shearson Lehman/American Express.

From 1983 to 1990, Peter A. Cohen was CEO and chairman of Shearson Lehman Brothers, where he led the $1 billion purchase of E.F. Hutton to form Shearson Lehman Hutton. In 1989, Shearson backed F. Ross Johnson's management team in its attempted management buyout of RJR Nabisco, but were ultimately outbid by private equity firm Kohlberg Kravis Roberts, who was backed by Drexel Burnham Lambert.

=== Divestment and independence (1994–2008) ===
In 1993, under newly appointed CEO Harvey Golub, American Express began to divest itself of its banking and brokerage operations. It sold its retail brokerage and asset management operations to Primerica and in 1994 it spun off Lehman Brothers Kuhn Loeb in an initial public offering, as Lehman Brothers Holdings, Inc. After being spun off, Dick Fuld became CEO of the company. He led one of the United States and the world's bulge-bracket investment banks. Fuld steered Lehman through the 1997 Asian financial crisis, and when the Long Term Capital Management hedge fund collapsed in 1998.

In 2001, the firm acquired the private-client services, or "PCS", business of Cowen & Co. and later, in 2003, aggressively re-entered the asset-management business, which it had exited in 1989. Beginning with $2 billion in assets under management, the firm acquired the Crossroads Group, the fixed-income division of Lincoln Capital Management and Neuberger Berman. These businesses, together with the PCS business and Lehman's private-equity business, comprised the Investment Management Division, which generated approximately $3.1 billion in net revenue.

During the subprime mortgage crisis, Fuld kept his job while CEOs of rivals like Bear Stearns, Merrill Lynch, and Citigroup were forced to resign. In addition, Lehman's board of directors, which included retired CEOs like Vodafone's Christopher Gent and IBM's John Akers were reluctant to challenge Fuld as the firm's share price spiraled lower.

In May 2008, prior to going bankrupt, the firm had $639 billion in assets.

=== Response to September 11, 2001 attacks ===
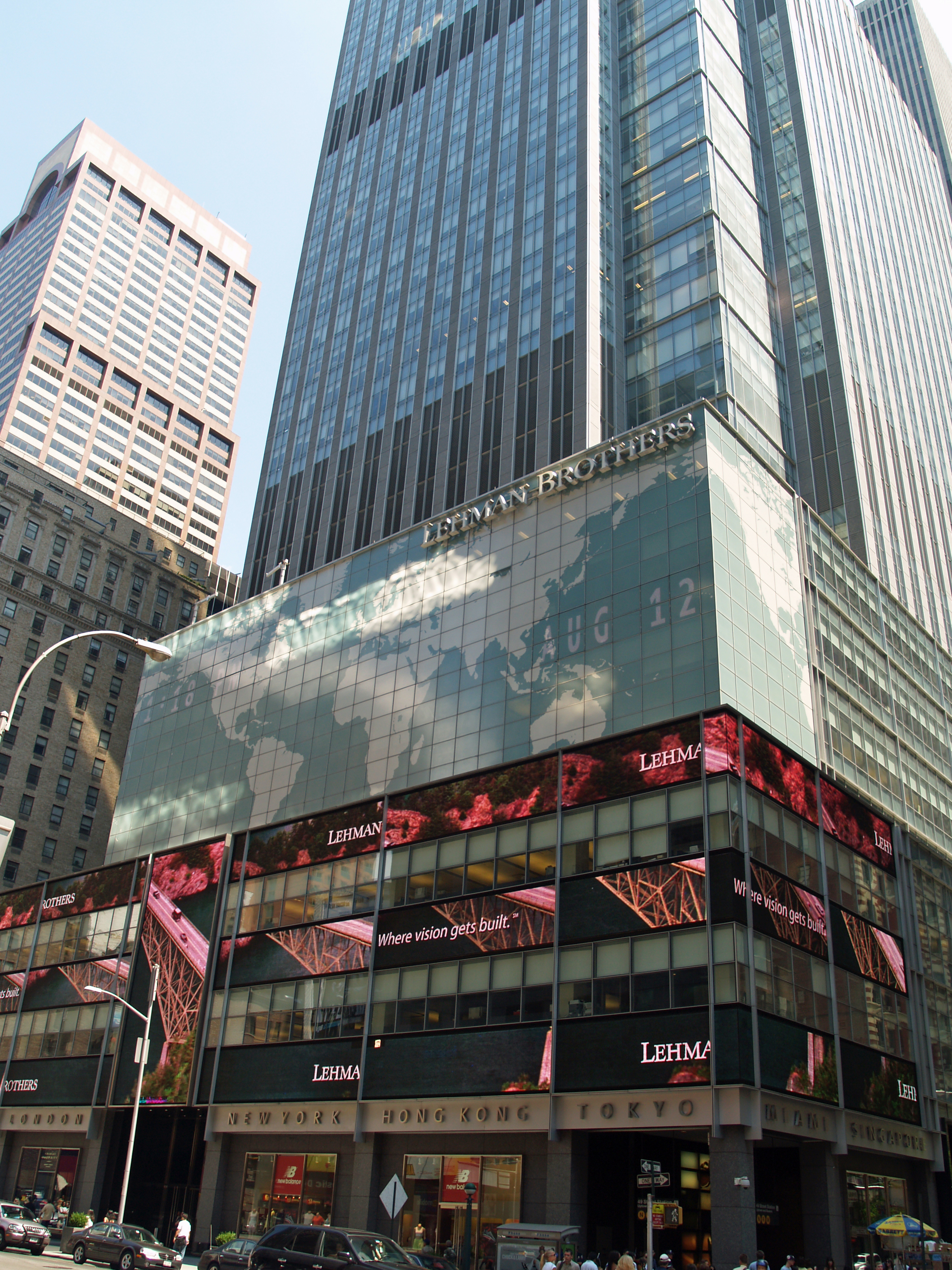
The former New York City headquarters, now owned by Barclays

On September 11, 2001, Lehman occupied three floors (38–40) of 1 World Trade Center, where one of its employees was killed in the terrorist attacks of that day. Its global headquarters in Three World Financial Center were severely damaged and rendered unusable by falling debris, displacing over 6,500 employees. Trading operations moved to Jersey City, New Jersey. When stock markets reopened on September 17, 2001, Lehman's sales and trading capabilities were restored.

In the ensuing months, the firm spread its operations across New York City in over 40 temporary locations. The investment-banking division converted the first-floor lounges, restaurants, and all 665 guest rooms of the Sheraton Manhattan Hotel into office space.

The bank also experimented with flextime (to share office space) and remote work via virtual private networking after the attacks. In October 2001, Lehman purchased a 32-story, 1,050,000-square-foot (98,000 m^{2}) office building for a reported sum of $700 million. The building, located at 745 Seventh Avenue, had recently been completed, and not yet occupied, by rival Morgan Stanley. Lehman began moving into the new facility in January and finished in March 2002. The firm did not return to Three World Financial Center as its structural integrity had not been given a clean bill of health, and the company could not have waited for repairs to Three World Financial Center to conclude.

After the attacks, Lehman's management placed increased emphasis on business continuity planning. Aside from its headquarters in Three World Financial Center, Lehman maintained operations-and-backoffice facilities in Jersey City, space that the firm considered leaving prior to 9/11. The space was not only retained, but expanded, including the construction of a backup-trading facility.

=== Rise of mortgage origination (1997–2006) ===
Lehman was one of the first Wall Street firms to move into the business of mortgage origination. In 1997, Lehman bought Colorado-based lender, Aurora Loan Services (not a bank), an Alt-A lender. In 2000, to expand their mortgage origination pipeline, Lehman purchased West Coast subprime mortgage lender BNC Mortgage LLC. Lehman quickly became a force in the subprime market. By 2003 Lehman made $18.2 billion in loans and ranked third in lending. By 2004, this number topped $40 billion. By 2006, Aurora and BNC were lending almost $50 billion per month. By 2008, Lehman had assets of $680 billion supported by only $22.5 billion of firm capital. From an equity position, its risky commercial real estate holdings were thirty times greater than capital. In such a highly leveraged structure, a 3 to 5 percent decline in real estate values would wipe out all capital.

== Collapse ==
=== Causes ===
==== Malfeasance ====
A March 2010 report by the court appointed examiner indicated that Lehman executives regularly used cosmetic accounting gimmicks at the end of each quarter to make its finances appear less shaky than they really were. This practice was a type of repurchase agreement that temporarily removed securities from the company's balance sheet. However, unlike typical repurchase agreements, these deals were described by Lehman as the outright sale of securities and created "a materially misleading picture of the firm's financial condition in late 2007 and 2008".

==== Subprime mortgage crisis ====
In August 2007, the firm closed its subprime lender, BNC Mortgage, eliminating 1,200 positions in 23 locations, and took an after-tax charge of $25 million and a $27 million reduction in goodwill. Lehman said that poor market conditions in the mortgage space "necessitated a substantial reduction in its resources and capacity in the subprime space."

In September 2007, Joe Gregory appointed Erin Callan as CFO. On March 16, 2008, after rival Bear Stearns was taken over by JPMorgan Chase in a fire sale, market analysts suggested that Lehman would be the next major investment bank to fall. Callan fielded Lehman's first quarter conference call, where the firm posted a profit of $48.9 million, compared to Citigroup's $5.1 billion and Merrill Lynch's $1.97 billion losses, which marked Lehman's 55th consecutive profitable quarter. The firm's stock price leapt 46 percent after that announcement.

In 2008, Lehman faced an unprecedented loss to the continuing subprime mortgage crisis. Lehman's loss was a result of having held on to large positions in subprime and other lower-rated mortgage tranches when securitizing the underlying mortgages; it is unclear whether Lehman was simply unable to sell the lower-rated bonds or voluntarily kept them. In any event, huge losses accrued in lower-rated mortgage-backed securities throughout 2008. In the second fiscal quarter, Lehman reported losses of $2.8 billion and was forced to sell off $6 billion in assets. In the first half of 2008 alone, Lehman stock lost 73% of its value as the credit market continued to tighten.

On June 9, 2008, Lehman Brothers announced a US$2.8 billion second-quarter loss, its first since being spun off from American Express, as market volatility rendered many of its hedges ineffective during that time. Lehman also reported that it had raised a further $6 billion in capital. As a result, there was major management shakeup, in which Hugh "Skip" McGee III (head of investment banking) held a meeting with senior staff to strip CEO Richard Fuld and his lieutenants of their authority. Consequently, Joe Gregory agreed to resign as president and COO, and afterward he told Erin Callan that she had to resign as CFO. Callan was appointed CFO of Lehman in 2008 but served only for six months, before departing after her mentor Joe Gregory was demoted. Bart McDade was named to succeed Gregory as president and COO, when several senior executives threatened to leave if he was not promoted. McDade took charge and brought back Michael Gelband and Alex Kirk, who had previously been pushed out of the firm by Gregory for not taking risks. Although Fuld remained CEO, he soon became isolated from McDade's team.

In August 2008, Lehman reported that it intended to release 6% of its work force, 1,500 people, just ahead of its third-quarter-reporting deadline in September. On August 22, 2008, shares in Lehman closed up 5% (16% for the week) on reports that the state-controlled Korea Development Bank was considering buying the bank. Most of those gains were quickly eroded as news came in that Korea Development Bank was "facing difficulties pleasing regulators and attracting partners for the deal."

On September 9, Lehman's shares plunged 45% to $7.79, after it was reported that the state-run South Korean firm had put talks on hold. Investor confidence continued to erode as Lehman's stock lost roughly half its value and pushed the S&P 500 down 3.4% on September 9. The Dow Jones lost 300 points the same day on investors' concerns about the security of the bank. The U.S. government did not announce any plans to assist with any possible financial crisis that emerged at Lehman.

The next day, Lehman announced a loss of $3.9 billion and its intent to sell off a majority stake in its investment-management business, which included Neuberger Berman. The stock slid seven percent that day. Lehman, after earlier rejecting questions on the sale of the company, was reportedly searching for a buyer as its stock price dropped another 40 percent on September 11, 2008.

Just before the collapse of Lehman Brothers, executives at Neuberger Berman sent e-mail memos suggesting, among other things, that the Lehman Brothers' top people forgo multimillion-dollar bonuses to "send a strong message to both employees and investors that management is not shirking accountability for recent performance." Lehman Brothers Investment Management Director George Herbert Walker IV dismissed the proposal, going so far as to actually apologize to other members of the Lehman Brothers executive committee for the idea having been suggested. He wrote, "Sorry team. I am not sure what's in the water at Neuberger Berman. I'm embarrassed and I apologize."

==== Short-selling allegations ====
During hearings on the bankruptcy filing by Lehman Brothers and bailout of AIG before the House Committee on Oversight and Government Reform, former Lehman Brothers CEO Richard Fuld said a host of factors including a crisis of confidence and naked short-selling attacks followed by false rumors contributed to both the collapse of Bear Stearns and Lehman Brothers. House committee Chairman Henry Waxman said the committee received thousands of pages of internal documents from Lehman and these documents portray a company in which there was "no accountability for failure".

An article by journalist Matt Taibbi in Rolling Stone contended that naked short selling contributed to the demise of both Lehman and Bear Stearns. A study by finance researchers at the University of Oklahoma Price College of Business studied trading in financial stocks, including Lehman Brothers and Bear Stearns, and found "no evidence that stock price declines were caused by naked short selling".

=== Bankruptcy ===
On Saturday, September 13, 2008, Timothy F. Geithner, then the president of the Federal Reserve Bank of New York, called a meeting on the future of Lehman, which included the possibility of an emergency liquidation of its assets. Lehman reported that it had been in talks with Bank of America and Barclays for the company's possible sale; however, both Barclays and Bank of America ultimately declined to purchase the entire company, in the former case because the British government (in particular, the Chancellor of the Exchequer Alistair Darling and the CEO of the Financial Services Authority Hector Sants) refused to allow the transaction at the last minute, quoting stockholder regulations in the UK, despite a deal having apparently been completed.

The next day, Sunday, September 14, the International Swaps and Derivatives Association (ISDA) offered an exceptional trading session to allow market participants to offset positions in various derivatives on the condition of a Lehman bankruptcy later that day. Although the bankruptcy filing missed the deadline, many dealers honored the trades they made in the special session.

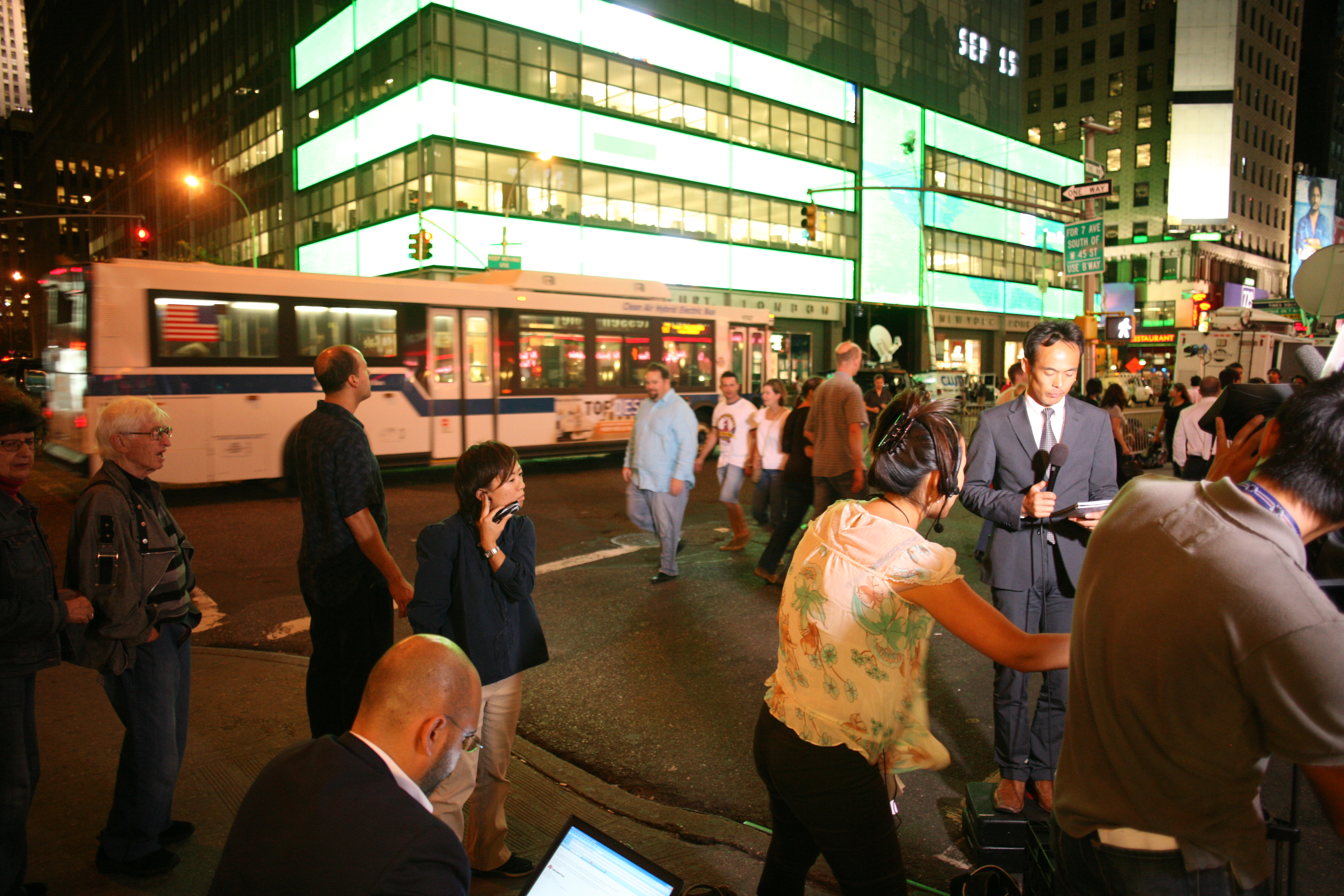
Lehman Brothers headquarters in New York City on September 15, 2008

Shortly before 1 am Monday morning (UTC−5), Lehman Brothers Holdings announced it would file for Chapter 11 bankruptcy protection citing bank debt of $613 billion, $155 billion in bond debt, and assets worth $639 billion. It further announced that its subsidiaries would continue to operate as normal. A group of Wall Street firms agreed to provide capital and financial assistance for the bank's orderly liquidation and the Federal Reserve, in turn, agreed to a swap of lower-quality assets in exchange for loans and other assistance from the government. The morning witnessed scenes of Lehman employees removing files, items with the company logo, and other belongings from the world headquarters at 745 Seventh Avenue. The spectacle continued throughout the day and into the following day.

Brian Marsal, co-chief executive of the restructuring firm Alvarez and Marsal was appointed as chief restructuring officer and subsequently chief executive officer of the company.

Later that day, the Australian Securities Exchange (ASX) suspended Lehman's Australian subsidiary as a market participant after clearing-houses terminated contracts with the firm. Lehman shares tumbled over 90% on September 15, 2008. The Dow Jones closed down just over 500 points on September 15, 2008, which was at the time the largest drop in a single day since the days following the attacks on September 11, 2001.

In the United Kingdom, the investment bank went to administration with PricewaterhouseCoopers appointed as administrators. In Japan, the Japanese branch, Lehman Brothers Japan Inc., and its holding company filed for civil reorganization on September 16, 2008, in Tokyo District Court. On September 17, 2008, the New York Stock Exchange delisted Lehman Brothers.

On March 16, 2011—some three years after filing for bankruptcy and following a filing in a Manhattan U.S. bankruptcy court—Lehman Brothers Holdings Inc announced it would seek creditor approval of its reorganization plan by October 14 followed by a confirmation hearing to follow on November 17.

=== Liquidation ===
==== Barclays acquisition ====
On September 16, 2008, Barclays PLC announced that they would acquire a "stripped clean" portion of Lehman for $1.75 billion, including most of Lehman's North America operations. On September 20, 2008, a revised version of the deal, a $1.35 billion (£700 million) plan for Barclays to acquire the core business of Lehman (mainly its $960-million headquarters, a 38-story office building at 745 Seventh Avenue in Midtown Manhattan, with responsibility for 9,000 former employees), was approved. After a 7-hour hearing, U.S. bankruptcy judge James Peck ruled:

"I have to approve this transaction because it is the only available transaction. Lehman Brothers became a victim, in effect the only true icon to fall in a tsunami that has befallen the credit markets. This is the most momentous bankruptcy hearing I've ever sat through. It can never be deemed precedent for future cases. It's hard for me to imagine a similar emergency."

Luc Despins, then a partner at Milbank, Tweed, Hadley & McCloy, the creditors committee counsel, said: "The reason we're not objecting is really based on the lack of a viable alternative. We did not support the transaction because there had not been enough time to properly review it." In the amended agreement, Barclays would absorb $47.4 billion in securities and assume $45.5 billion in trading liabilities. Lehman's attorney Harvey R. Miller of Weil, Gotshal & Manges, said "the purchase price for the real estate components of the deal would be $1.29 billion, including $960 million for Lehman's New York headquarters and $330 million for two New Jersey data centers. Lehman's original estimate valued its headquarters at $1.02 billion but an appraisal from CB Richard Ellis this week valued it at $900 million." Barclays were not to acquire Lehman's Eagle Energy unit, but to have entities known as Lehman Brothers Canada Inc, Lehman Brothers Sudamerica, Lehman Brothers Uruguay and its Private Investment Management business for high-net-worth individuals. Finally, Lehman would retain $20 billion of securities assets in Lehman Brothers Inc that are not being transferred to Barclays. Barclays acquired a potential liability of $2.5 billion to be paid as severance, if it chooses not to retain some Lehman employees beyond the guaranteed 90 days.

==== Nomura acquisition ====
Nomura Holdings, Japan's top brokerage firm, agreed to buy the Asian division of Lehman Brothers for $225 million and parts of the European division for a nominal fee of $2. It would not take on any trading assets or liabilities in the European units. Nomura negotiated such a low price because it acquired only Lehman's employees in the regions, and not its stocks, bonds or other assets. The last Lehman Brothers Annual Report identified that these non-US subsidiaries of Lehman Brothers were responsible for over 50% of global revenue produced.

==== Sale of asset management businesses ====
On September 29, 2008, Lehman agreed to sell Neuberger Berman, part of its investment management business, to a pair of private-equity firms, Bain Capital Partners and Hellman & Friedman, for $2.15 billion. The transaction was expected to close in early 2009, subject to approval by the U.S. Bankruptcy Court, but a competing bid was entered by the firm's management, who ultimately prevailed in a bankruptcy auction on December 3, 2008. Creditors of Lehman Brothers Holdings Inc. retain a 49% common equity interest in the firm, now known as Neuberger Berman Group LLC. In Europe, the Quantitative Asset Management Business has been acquired back by its employees on November 13, 2008 and has been renamed back to TOBAM.

=== Financial fallout ===
Lehman's bankruptcy was the largest failure of an investment bank since Drexel Burnham Lambert collapsed in 1990 amid fraud allegations. Immediately following the bankruptcy filing, an already distressed financial market began a period of extreme volatility, during which the Dow experienced its largest one day point loss, largest intra-day range (more than 1,000 points) and largest daily point gain. What followed was what many have called the "perfect storm" of economic distress factors and eventually a $700bn bailout package (Troubled Asset Relief Program) prepared by Henry Paulson, Secretary of the Treasury, and approved by Congress. The Dow eventually closed at a new six-year low of 7,552.29 on November 20, followed by a further drop to 6626 by March of the next year.

The fall of Lehman also had a strong effect on small private investors such as bond holders and holders of so-called minibonds. In Germany, structured products, often based on an index, were sold mostly to private investors, elderly, retired persons, students and families. Most of the derivatives were sold by the German arm of Citigroup, the German Citibank now owned by Crédit Mutuel.

== Merger and acquisition history ==
The following is an illustration of the company's major mergers and acquisitions and historical predecessors (this is not a comprehensive list):

- Lehman Brothers (1994, spun off by American Express; 2008, bankrupt)
  - Shearson Lehman Hutton (merged 1988)
    - Shearson Lehman Brothers (merged 1984)
      - Shearson/American Express (merged 1981)
        - American Express
          (est. 1850)
        - Shearson Loeb Rhoades (acquired 1981)
          - Shearson Hayden Stone (merged 1973)
            - Hayden Stone, Inc. (formerly CBWL-Hayden Stone, merged 1970)
              - Cogan, Berlind, Weill & Levitt
                (formerly Carter, Berlind, Potoma & Weill, est. 1960)
              - Hayden, Stone & Co.
            - Shearson, Hammill & Co.
              (est. 1902)
          - Loeb, Rhoades, Hornblower & Co. (merged 1978)
            - Loeb, Rhoades & Co. (merged 1937)
              - Carl M. Loeb & Co.
                (est. 1931)
              - Rhoades & Company
                (est. 1905)
            - Hornblower, Weeks, Noyes & Trask (merged 1953–1977)
              - Hornblower & Weeks
                (est. 1888)
              - Hemphill, Noyes & Co.
                (est. 1919, acq. 1963)
              - Spencer Trask & Co.
                (est. 1866 as Trask & Brown)
              - Paul H. Davis & Co.
                (est. 1920, acq. 1953)
      - Lehman Brothers Kuhn Loeb (merged 1977)
        - Lehman Brothers (merged 1975)
          - Abraham & Co.
            (est. 1938)
          - Lehman Brothers
            (est. 1850)
        - Kuhn, Loeb & Co.
          (est. 1867)
    - E. F. Hutton & Co.
      (est. 1904)
  - Neuberger Berman
    (est. 1939, acq. 2003,
    sold to management 2009)
  - Crossroads Group
    (est. 1981, acq. 2003)

== Litigation history ==
In June 2003, the company was one of ten firms which simultaneously entered into a settlement with the U.S. Securities and Exchange Commission (SEC), the Office of the New York State Attorney General and various other securities regulators, regarding undue influence over each firm's research analysts by its investment-banking divisions. Regulators alleged that the firms had improperly associated analyst compensation with the firms' investment-banking revenues, and promised favorable, market-moving research coverage, in exchange for underwriting opportunities. The settlement, known as the "global settlement", provided for total financial penalties of $1.4 billion, including $80 million against Lehman, and structural reforms including a complete separation of investment banking departments from research departments, no analyst compensation, directly or indirectly, from investment-banking revenues, and the provision of free, independent, third-party, research to the firms' clients.

On March 11, 2010, Anton R. Valukas, a court-appointed examiner, published the results of its year-long investigation into the finances of Lehman Brothers. This report revealed that Lehman Brothers used an accounting procedure termed repo 105 to temporarily exchange $50 billion of assets into cash just before publishing its financial statements. The action could be seen to implicate both Ernst & Young, the bank's accountancy firm and Richard S. Fuld Jr., the former CEO. This could have potentially lead to Ernst & Young being found guilty of financial malpractice and Fuld facing time in prison. According to The Wall Street Journal, in March 2011, the SEC announced that they weren't confident that they could prove that Lehman Brothers violated US laws in its accounting practices.

In October 2011, the administrators of Lehman Brothers Holding Inc. lost their appeal to overturn a court order forcing them to pay £148 million into their underfunded pensions plan.

As of January 2016, Lehman paid more than $105 billion to its unsecured creditors. In addition, JPMorgan will pay $1.42 billion in cash to settle a lawsuit accusing JPMorgan of draining Lehman Brothers liquidity right before the crash. The settlement would permit another $1.496 billion to be paid to creditors and a separate $76 million deposit.

The brokerage unit of Lehman Brothers completed its liquidation process on September 28, 2022, after paying out over $115 billion to its customers and creditors over the course of 14 years. As of December 2022, Lehman's British operations were being administrated by PricewaterhouseCoopers, which was expected to complete the administration process no earlier than 2025. In October of 2025, Lehman Brothers International Europe formally exited administration, having repaid creditors in full with 8% interest, 17 years after the original collapse.

The administrators of Lehman Brothers Holding stated in March 2026 that the company was anticipated its ability to pay its remaining statutory-interest obligations to unsubordinated creditors in full, including a potential return to subordinated creditors. The return was dependent on the outcome of remaining asset recoveries.

== Former officers ==
- Richard S. Fuld Jr.
- Scott J. Freidheim
- Rodger Krouse (born 1961)
- Jack Langer (born 1948/1949), basketball player and investment banker
- Bart McDade
- Hugh McGee
- George Herbert Walker IV
- Frederick M. Warburg
- Joseph Rosenberg

== In popular culture ==
The events of the weekend leading up to Lehman's bankruptcy are dramatized in the 2009 BBC television film The Last Days of Lehman Brothers.

In the 2010 animated film Despicable Me, the main character Gru visits the Bank of Evil, which funds all evil plots for villains around the world and has a sign reading "Formerly Lehman Brothers".

The 2011 drama film Margin Call focuses on the events of a 24-hour period at a large investment bank based on an amalgam of investment banks, drawing heavily from the culture of Lehman Brothers. However, the events in the film are primarily a depiction of the actions of Goldman Sachs.

The 2011 HBO film Too Big to Fail recounts the days before Lehman Brothers declared bankruptcy and the fallout afterward.

The 2011 film Horrible Bosses features a character by the name of Kenny Sommerfield (played by P. J. Byrne) who worked at Lehman Brothers until its bankruptcy, ending up broke.

The fall of Lehman Brothers is depicted in the 2015 film The Big Short, where two of the characters walk around the Lehman Brothers offices after the bankruptcy to see the main trading floor.

In Imbolo Mbue's 2016 debut novel Behold the Dreamers, an immigrant from Cameroon is a chauffeur for Clark Edwards, an executive at Lehman Brothers.

In the 2016 animated film Zootopia, there is a brief appearance of a bank called Lemming Brothers, which is staffed by lemmings.

The Lehman Trilogy is a three-act play by Italian dramatist Stefano Massini about the history of the Lehman Brothers.

In the 2019 Showtime comedy series Black Monday, a fictionalized version of Lehman Brothers with an altered spelling is central to the plot and represented by brothers Larry & Lenny Leighman.

== Principal locations (first year of occupancy) ==
- 17 Court Square, Montgomery, Alabama (1847)*
- 119 Liberty Street, New York, NY (1858)
- 176 Fulton Street, New York, NY (1865–1866?)
- 133–35 Pearl Street, New York, NY (1867)
- 40 Exchange Place, New York, NY (1876)
- 16 William Street, New York, NY (1892)
- One William Street, New York, NY (1928) **
- 55 Water Street (1980) ***
- 3 World Financial Center (1985)
- 745 Seventh Avenue, New York, NY (2002)

* Henry Lehman established his first store location on Commerce Street, in Montgomery, in 1845. In 1848, one year after Emanuel's arrival, the brothers moved "H. Lehman & Bro." to 17 Court Square, where it remained when Mayer arrived in 1850, forming "Lehman Brothers".
** Designated as a landmark by the New York City Landmarks Preservation Committee in 1996.
*** Sales and trading personnel had been in this location since 1977; they were joined by the firm's investment bankers and brokers in 1980.

== See also ==
- MF Global, the largest Wall Street firm to collapse, as it did in 2011, since the Lehman Brothers debacle in September 2008
- Valukas Report on the failure of Lehman
- Bankruptcy in the United States
- The Lehman Trilogy, a play about the Lehman family and the collapse of the firm in 2008
