= Fred Foreman =

American politician

United States Attorney for the Northern District of Illinois
- In office 1990–1993
- Preceded by: Anton R. Valukas
- Succeeded by: Jim Burns

Personal details
- Born: Oak Park, Illinois, U.S.
- Party: Republican
- Spouse: Stephanie
- Education: Carroll University (B.A.); John Marshall Law School (J.D.)
- Occupation: Attorney; Judge

Fred Foreman is an American politician who served as the United States Attorney for the Northern District of Illinois from 1990 to 1993.

== Biography ==
Foreman was born in Oak Park, Illinois. During his childhood, his family moved to Wildwood, Illinois. Foreman graduated from Warren Township High School. He was accepted to the United States Air Force Academy, but left due to an injury. He subsequently took classes at Loop College, the University of Illinois Chicago, and Carroll University. He played football at Carroll where he graduated in 1970. He earned his J.D. degree from John Marshall Law School and became a licensed lawyer in 1974.

In the 1980 election, Foreman defeated Democratic incumbent Dennis P. Ryan for the position of Lake County State's Attorney. A decade later, Foreman was Robert Michel's top pick to succeed Anton Valukas as the United States Attorney for the Northern District of Illinois at least in part due to the perception that Foreman would, unlike Dan K. Webb and Valukas, use the office as a stepping stone to statewide office. President Bill Clinton appointed Jim Burns to replace Foreman as U.S. Attorney.

He was elected as judge for Illinois's 19th circuit court in 2004 and retained in 2010. In 2014, Foreman retired from the bench and joined Freeborn & Peters LLP as senior counsel dealing with the government & regulatory law, anti-trust law, and complex litigation.
