= The Kinkaid School =

School in Piney Point Village, Texas, US

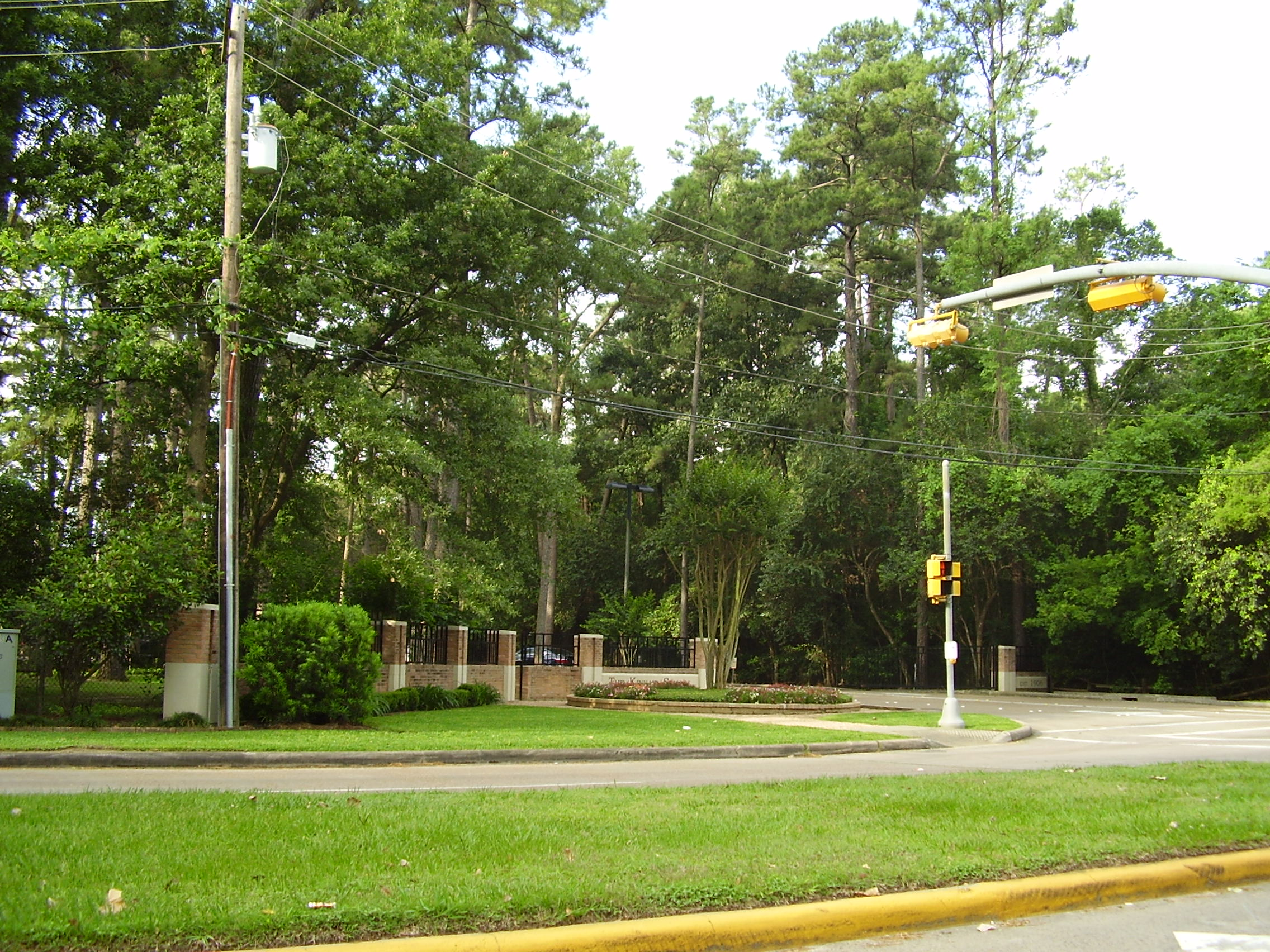

Location
- 201 Kinkaid School Drive; Piney Point Village, (Harris County), Texas; United States; 29°45′06″N 95°30′42″W

Information
- Type: Private; Independent; day; college-preparatory school
- Motto: Latin: Lux per Scientiam (Light through Knowledge)
- Religious affiliation: Nonsectarian
- Established: 1906; 120 years ago
- NCES School ID: Z1328448
- Head of School: Ed Harris
- Teaching staff: 142.9 (FTE) (2015–16)
- Grades: PK-12
- Gender: Co-educational
- Enrollment: 1,375 (2015–16)
- Student to teacher ratio: 9.6:1 (2015–16)
- Campus: Large suburb
- Colors: Purple; Gold
- Athletics: Basketball • Soccer • Swimming & Diving • Wrestling • Baseball • Golf • Lacrosse • Softball • Tennis • Track & Field • Cheerleading • Cross Country • Field Hockey • Football • Volleyball
- Athletics conference: Southwest Preparatory Conference
- Mascot: Falcon
- Nickname: Falcons
- Accreditation: Independent Schools Association of the Southwest
- Newspaper: The Falcon
- Yearbook: Kinkaidian
- Tuition: Lower school: $30,580; Middle school: $35,830; Upper school: $37,105 (2025-26)
- Website: Official website

The Kinkaid School is a private PK–12 non-sectarian college preparatory school in Piney Point Village, Texas, United States in Greater Houston.

The Kinkaid School is the oldest independent coeducational school in Greater Houston. The student body is divided into the Lower School (PreK – 4th Grade), the Middle School (5th grade – 8th grade) and the Upper School (9th grade – 12th grade). The school motto is: "Lux per Scientiam" meaning, "Light through Knowledge". The School colors are purple and gold, and the school mascot is the falcon. The school is accredited by the Independent Schools Association of the Southwest.

The current head of school is Ed Harris. The current chairman of the Board of Trustees is Steven P. Mach.

A feature of Kinkaid's Upper School is its Interim Term, which provides three weeks in January for teacher-designed and student-selected curricula. Teachers at the School provide classes that they would otherwise not be able to teach as part of the normal semester, including military histories of the Civil War and World War II, introductory courses in digital programming and engineering, courses in photography and art history, and a course in Disney films. Students may also go on international trips sponsored by the school, such as tours of China, Italy and Greece; homestays in Mexico and France are also possibilities. Finally, the School provides connections with companies throughout the greater Houston area and, if the students prefer, throughout the world, in which its senior students may find internships.

== Athletics ==
Kinkaid sports teams compete in the Southwest Preparatory Conference of the Independent Schools Association in the Southwest. An alumni event is the Kinkaid vs. St. John's School football game played each year at Rice Stadium, with the winning record belonging to Kinkaid.

Kinkaid offers multiple sports per each sports season (fall, winter and spring). In the fall, it offers football (boys only), cross country (often known as XC) , volleyball, cheerleading and field hockey (girls only). In the winter, it offers soccer, basketball, wrestling (boys only) and swimming. In the spring, it offers lacrosse, baseball (boys only), softball (girls only), track & field, tennis and golf.

For students who don't choose to play competitive team sports, Kinkaid offers yoga, badminton, cardio fitness, beginner golf, physical conditioning, and recreational tennis as alternatives.

== Arts ==
Kinkaid offers courses in the performing and visual arts to its upper and middle school students. The performing arts include dance, acting, choir, band, and orchestra. There are performances during the year. Visual arts courses include drawing and illustration, painting, printmaking, photography, film, and ceramics. Arts students can participate in the annual Independent Schools Association of the Southwest (ISAS) Arts Festival.

== History ==
The School was founded in 1906 by Margaret Hunter Kinkaid. When the School was first established, it was located in the dining room of Margaret Hunter Kinkaid's house, which was at the intersection of Elgin and San Jacinto in what is now Midtown Houston. Tuition at the School ranged from $90 per year for first and second grades to $130 per year for sixth graders. Tuition for the 2016–2017 school year was $20,500 for Pre-K through Grade 4, $23,720 for Grades 5 through 8, and $25,000 for Grades 9 through 12. Books, lunch, and a one-time $1000 new student fee are not included.

=== The Richmond Campus ===
The School's second location was at the intersection of Richmond and Graustark in the Neartown neighborhood. The School moved to this location in the fall of 1924. The School had its first Open House that year to celebrate the new facility. Kinkaid also added its upper school program beginning in the late 1920s. After more than thirty years, the school eventually outgrew its campus and was forced to look for a new location. The administration bought land in Piney Point Village.

=== Piney Point Village campus ===
Since 1957 and through the present day, the school has been on a 40-acre (16 ha) site in the city of Piney Point Village, an enclave of Houston, at the junction of 201 Kinkaid School Drive and San Felipe. Beginning in the early 1990s, the campus began a construction program in an effort to modernize its facilities. A new lower school building was constructed, and the old building was torn down, along with the "little" gym and lower school art and science buildings. A new middle school building was also constructed, and the existing upper school was expanded into the old middle school building. A new auditorium and cafeteria were built, and the remaining campus buildings were renovated.

Since 2022, improvements to the school have been made through Kinkaid's "All In" plan for campus renovations and restructuring. As of May 2024, the total amount raised for the campaign was over $141 million. In June 2025, the new Upper School was completed in time for the 2025-2026 school year.

== Formal headteachers ==
Jonathan Eades is now the sixth head of school.

- Margaret Hunter Kinkaid, the school's founder, was the first headmistress until 1951.
- John H. Cooper, worked at the school for over two decades. Cooper helped move the campus from its Richmond location to the current Memorial site. Cooper left to co-found The John Cooper School in Woodlands in 1972.
- Glenn Ballard was recruited to replace Cooper in 1972. Ballard retired after 24 years.
- Donald C. North was recruited to replace Ballard. North led Kinkaid from 1996 to 2013.
- Andrew D. Martire was appointed Kinkaid's fifth headmaster in 2013.

== The Kinkaid School Archives ==
The Kinkaid School Archives contain the historical materials of The Kinkaid School including some of the earliest records of founder Margaret H. Kinkaid, as well as yearbooks, scrapbooks, newspapers, and photographic materials.

The Archives became the repository of the School in 2005 when a committee of school faculty, staff, and volunteers began collecting and organizing the materials. Located in the Upper School Moran Library, the Archives has since grown to a collection of faculty manuscripts, school administrative records, athletics records, architectural plans, early student records, present-day digital records, and some of the earliest class photos. The Archives are accessible to the general public.

== Academics ==
In a 2015 national survey, Kinkaid was one of the 50 "Smartest Private Schools in the United States."

Kinkaid is also known for its quiz bowl team. Their team was ranked first place nationally in the 2021–2022 season.

== "The Tipping Point" controversy ==
On November 11, 2009, a Kinkaid parent, Hugh "Skip" McGee III, sent an irate letter (entitled "The Tipping Point") to the School's board of trustees. An investment banker, McGee was angry that a teacher's comment about bankers had upset his son. The letter led to tension among the student body in response to the letter's reference to the student body president dressing in drag for a skit used during his campaign.

== 2026 Culture Fest controversy and leadership change ==
Jonathan Eades was unanimously appointed the sixth head of The Kinkaid School by its Board of Trustees. Eades began his tenure on July 1, 2020.

On March 31, 2026, the school held its annual Culture Fest. The event began in the early 2000s and is primarily organized by students. The event includes presentations and exhibits focusing on different countries and cultures.During the 2026 event, a student presented a poster about Palestine. The poster included a map labeling Israel, the Gaza Strip, and the West Bank as Palestine. The presentation received a second-place award from faculty members. The display and award drew criticism from StopAntisemitism and U.S. Senator Ted Cruz. The Council on American-Islamic Relations (CAIR) Texas chapter also released a statement regarding the situation.

StopAntisemitism posted an image of the poster on social media. The organization also criticized the school’s handling of the presentation. The organization stated that it had learned about the display through concerned parents and members of the school community. Cruz also commented publicly on the incident through the social media platform X. In a statement, CAIR-Texas called on the school to “immediately cease all retaliatory investigations.” CAIR-Texas stated that the Palestinian cultural display had been approved by the school before Culture Fest. The organization expressed concern that the school had an initiated an organization into the families involving criticism on social media.CAIR-Texas also argued that schools should protect cultural expression and prevent outside political pressure from influencing the decisions of their administrations.

In a letter to the school’s community on May 2, Eades addressed the criticism.He stated that the school had launched an investigation into the incident. He argued against allegations that the school’s administration had failed to respond and restated the school’s opposition to antisemitism. Eades also criticized the discussion surrounding the incident on social media and encouraged members of the school community to avoid participating in online exchanges. He emphasized the school’s responsibility to prepare students to engage with difficult conversations. At the time of the reporting, the school had not specified whether disciplinary action had been taken in response to the presentation.

Eades announced his resignation, effective at the end of the school year. In a letter to the school community, Eades stated that his decision was personal and that he had not been pressured to resign. Eades stated that he wanted to prioritize his family. He also stated that his decision had been under consideration for some time. The school’s board of trustees also maintained that Eades had been considering his departure for more than a year. The Board of Trustees described his resignation as a personal decision. School officials also stated that his departure was not related to any specific events. The Washington Free Beacon, citing unnamed sources familiar with the situation, reported that the board had moved to remove Eades from his position. Board Chair Evan Katz was designated to lead the search for Eades’s replacement.

== In popular culture ==
Philip Roth's novel, Exit Ghost, features a character who is described as having been a valedictorian at Kinkaid, prior to attending Harvard.

In 1998, the movie Rushmore filmed scenes at Kinkaid. St. John's alumnus Wes Anderson used the now demolished Lower School Building for scenes set in an elementary school.

Kevin Kwan’s novel, Sex and Vanity, features a character who is described as having attended Kinkaid while living on Lazy Lane—the most expensive street in Houston.

== Notable alumni ==
- Audrey Jones Beck (Class of 1939) – American art collector and philanthropist
- James A. Baker III (Class of 1948) – 61st US Secretary of State, 67th US Secretary of the Treasury
- William P. Hobby, Jr. (Class of 1949) – 37th Lieutenant Governor of Texas
- A. J. Carothers (Class of 1950) – Screenwriter, notable for his work with Walt Disney
- Patrick F. Taylor (Class of 1955) – American businessman, the founder and former CEO of Taylor Energy Company
- John Cassidy (Class of 1968) – Klutz Press Founder / Children's book author
- Robert L. Bradley, Jr. (Class of 1973) – Founder of the Institute for Energy Research (IER)
- George W. Bush – 43rd president of the United States
- Clark Ervin (Class of 1977) – First Inspector General of the Department of Homeland Security
- Carolyn McCormick (Class of 1977) – Actress, notably played Dr. Elizabeth Olivet in the Law & Order franchise.
- Adam Ereli (Class of 1978) – Former United States Ambassador to Bahrain
- Jeff Martin (Class of 1978) – American television producer and writer, winner of four Emmys, writer for The Simpsons and Late Night with David Letterman
- Jeb Bush – 43rd governor of Florida and member of the Bush political family
- G. Philip Stephenson (Class of 1983) – American businessman
- Farshid Guilak (Class of 1982) – Noted bioengineer and researcher, member of 3 National Academies, National Academy of Medicine, National Academy of Engineering, National Academy of Inventors
- David Hornsby (Class of 1994) – Actor, notably played Matthew "Rickety Cricket" Mara on the FX comedy series It's Always Sunny in Philadelphia
- Katherine Howe (Class of 1995) – American Novelist, author of The Physick Book of Deliverance Dane
- Eric Ladin (Class of 1996) – Actor
- Lauren Bush (Class of 2002) – Member of the Bush political family
- Stephen Wrabel (Class of 2007) – American singer, songwriter and musician
- Graham Gaylor (Class of 2010) – Co-Founder and CEO of VRChat
- Raevyn Rogers (Class of 2014) – Olympic bronze medalist, the fourth fastest woman in U.S. history in the olympic 800 meters.
- Jaedon LeDee (Class of 2018) – College basketball player, winner of the Naismith Memorial Basketball Hall of Fame's 2024 Karl Malone Award
- Josh Williams (Class of 2019) – NFL running back for the Tampa Bay Buccaneers
