= Bankruptcy of Lehman Brothers =

2008 bankruptcy of American investment bank

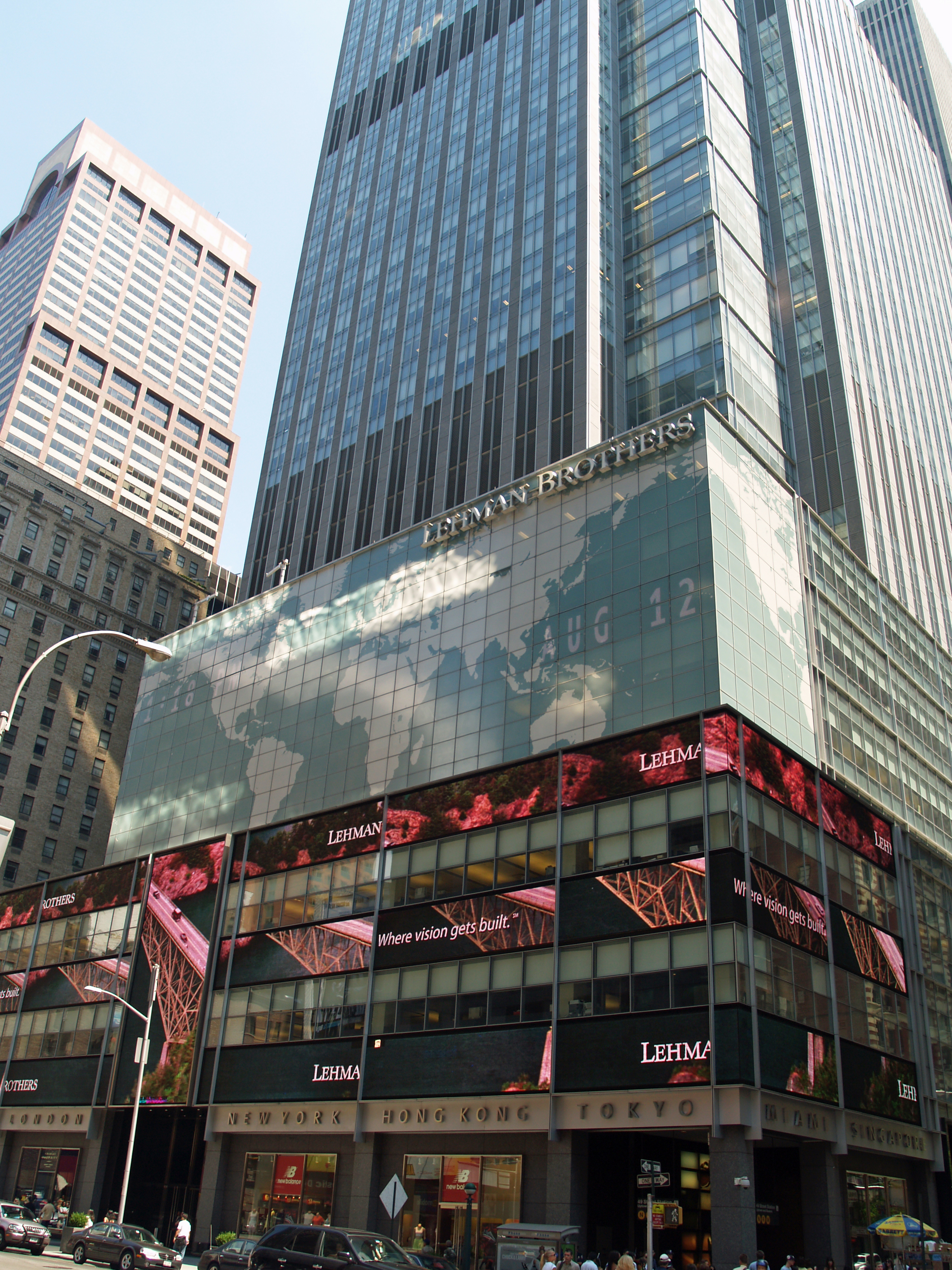
Lehman Brothers headquarters in New York City, one year prior to bankruptcy

The bankruptcy of Lehman Brothers, also known as the Crash of '08 and the Lehman Shock, on September 15, 2008, was the climax of the subprime mortgage crisis. After the financial services firm was notified of a pending credit downgrade due to its very heavy position in subprime mortgages, the Federal Reserve summoned several banks to negotiate financing for its reorganization. These discussions failed, and Lehman filed a Chapter 11 petition that remains the largest bankruptcy filing in U.S. history, involving more than US$600 billion in assets.

The bankruptcy triggered a 4.5% one-day drop in the Dow Jones Industrial Average, then the largest decline since the attacks of September 11, 2001. It shook confidence in the government's ability to manage the crisis and prompted a general financial panic. Money market mutual funds, a key source of credit, saw mass withdrawal demands to avoid losses, and the interbank lending market tightened, threatening banks with imminent failure. The government and the Federal Reserve system responded with several emergency measures to contain the panic.

Lehman Brothers' parent company, Lehman Brothers Holdings, remained in liquidation until September 28, 2022. Lehman's 110,000 customers received all $106 billion they were owed. General unsecured creditors received back $9.4 billion, or 41 cents on the dollar.

== Background ==
=== Rise of mortgage origination (1997–2006) ===
Lehman Brothers, one of the United States and the world's bulge-bracket investment banks, was one of the first Wall Street firms to move into the business of mortgage origination. In 1997, Lehman bought Colorado-based lender Aurora Loan Services, an Alt-A lender. In 2000, to expand their mortgage origination pipeline, Lehman purchased West Coast subprime mortgage lender BNC Mortgage LLC. Lehman quickly became a force in the subprime market. By 2003 Lehman made $18.2 billion in loans and ranked third in lending. By 2004, this number topped $40 billion. By 2006, Aurora and BNC were lending almost $50 billion per month.^{:129}

Lehman had morphed into a real estate hedge fund disguised as an investment bank.^{:135} By 2008, Lehman had assets of $680 billion supported by only $22.5 billion of firm capital. From an equity position, its risky commercial real estate holdings were thirty times greater than capital. In such a highly leveraged structure, a three- to five-percent decline in real estate values would wipe out all capital.

=== Exposure to the mortgage market ===
Lehman borrowed significant amounts to fund its investing in the years leading to its bankruptcy in 2008, a process known as leveraging or gearing. A significant portion of this investment was in housing-related assets, making it vulnerable to a downturn in that market. One measure of this risk-taking was its leverage ratio, a measure of the ratio of assets to owners equity, which increased from approximately 24:1 in 2003 to 31:1 by 2007. While generating tremendous profits during the boom, this vulnerable position meant that just a 3–4% decline in the value of its assets would entirely eliminate its book value of equity. Investment banks such as Lehman were not subject to the same regulations applied to depository banks to restrict their risk-taking.

In August 2007, Lehman closed its subprime lender, BNC Mortgage, eliminating 1,200 positions in 23 locations, and took a $25-million after-tax charge and a $27-million reduction in goodwill. The firm said that poor market conditions in the mortgage space "necessitated a substantial reduction in its resources and capacity in the subprime space".

=== Lehman's final months ===
In 2008, Lehman faced an unprecedented loss due to the continuing subprime mortgage crisis. Lehman's loss resulted from having held onto large positions in subprime and other lower-rated mortgage tranches when securitizing the underlying mortgages. Whether Lehman did this because it was simply unable to sell the lower-rated bonds or made a conscious decision to hold them is unclear. In any event, huge losses accrued in lower-rated mortgage-backed securities throughout 2008. Regulators began preparing contingencies, including unofficially approaching Barclays executive Robert Diamond about acquiring Lehman in April 2008; by then United States Treasury Secretary Henry Paulson had told Lehman CEO Richard Fuld that there would be no government bailout, so his firm needed to do a deal.

In the second fiscal quarter, Lehman reported losses of $2.8 billion and decided to raise $6 billion in additional capital by offering new shares. In the first half of 2008 alone, Lehman stock lost 73% of its value as the credit market continued to tighten. In August 2008, Lehman reported that it intended to lay-off 6% of its work force, 1,500 people, just ahead of its third-quarter-reporting deadline in September.

On August 22, shares in Lehman closed up 5% (16% for the week) on reports that the state-controlled Korea Development Bank was considering buying Lehman. Most of those gains were quickly eroded as news emerged that Korea Development Bank was "facing difficulties pleasing regulators and attracting partners for the deal." It culminated on September 9, when Lehman's shares plunged 45% to $7.79, after it was reported that the state-run South Korean firm had put talks on hold.

Investor confidence continued to erode as Lehman's stock lost roughly half its value and pushed the S&P 500 down 3.4% on September 9. The Dow Jones lost nearly 300 points the same day, on investors' concerns about the security of the bank. The U.S. government did not announce any plans to assist with any possible financial crisis that emerged at Lehman.

On September 10, Lehman announced a loss of $3.9 billion and their intent to sell off a majority stake in their investment-management business, which included Neuberger Berman. The stock slid 7% that day. On September 11, JPMorgan Chase, which cleared Lehman's trades, stopped the more than $100 billion Lehman borrowed daily via the interbank lending market. That day Paulson officially asked Diamond about purchasing Lehman.

On September 12, Timothy F. Geithner, then president of the Federal Reserve Bank of New York, called a meeting on the future of Lehman, which included the possibility of an emergency liquidation of its assets. Bankers representing all the major Wall Street firms were in attendance. The meeting goal was to find a private solution in rescuing Lehman and mitigate the 2008 financial crisis.^{:173} Lehman reported that it had been in talks with Bank of America and Barclays for the company's possible sale; both firms made offers, but the Treasury refused Bank of America's terms, so it purchased Merrill Lynch.

Barclays's purchase of Lehman seemed assured, but The New York Times reported on September 14, 2008, that Barclays had ended its bid to purchase all or part of Lehman and a deal to rescue the bank from liquidation collapsed. It emerged subsequently that a deal had been vetoed by the Bank of England and the UK's Financial Services Authority (FSA). FSA refused to waive the rule that shareholders approve such an acquisition. Leaders of major Wall Street banks continued to meet late that day to prevent the bank's rapid failure. Bank of America's rumored involvement also appeared to end as federal regulators resisted its request for government involvement in Lehman's sale. By Sunday, September 14, after the Barclays deal fell through, the news of impending doom swept through Lehman, and many employees arrived at the headquarters to clean out their offices. By Sunday afternoon, the government summoned Harvey Miller of Weil, Gotshal & Manges to file for bankruptcy before the markets opened on Monday.^{:176}

== Bankruptcy filing ==
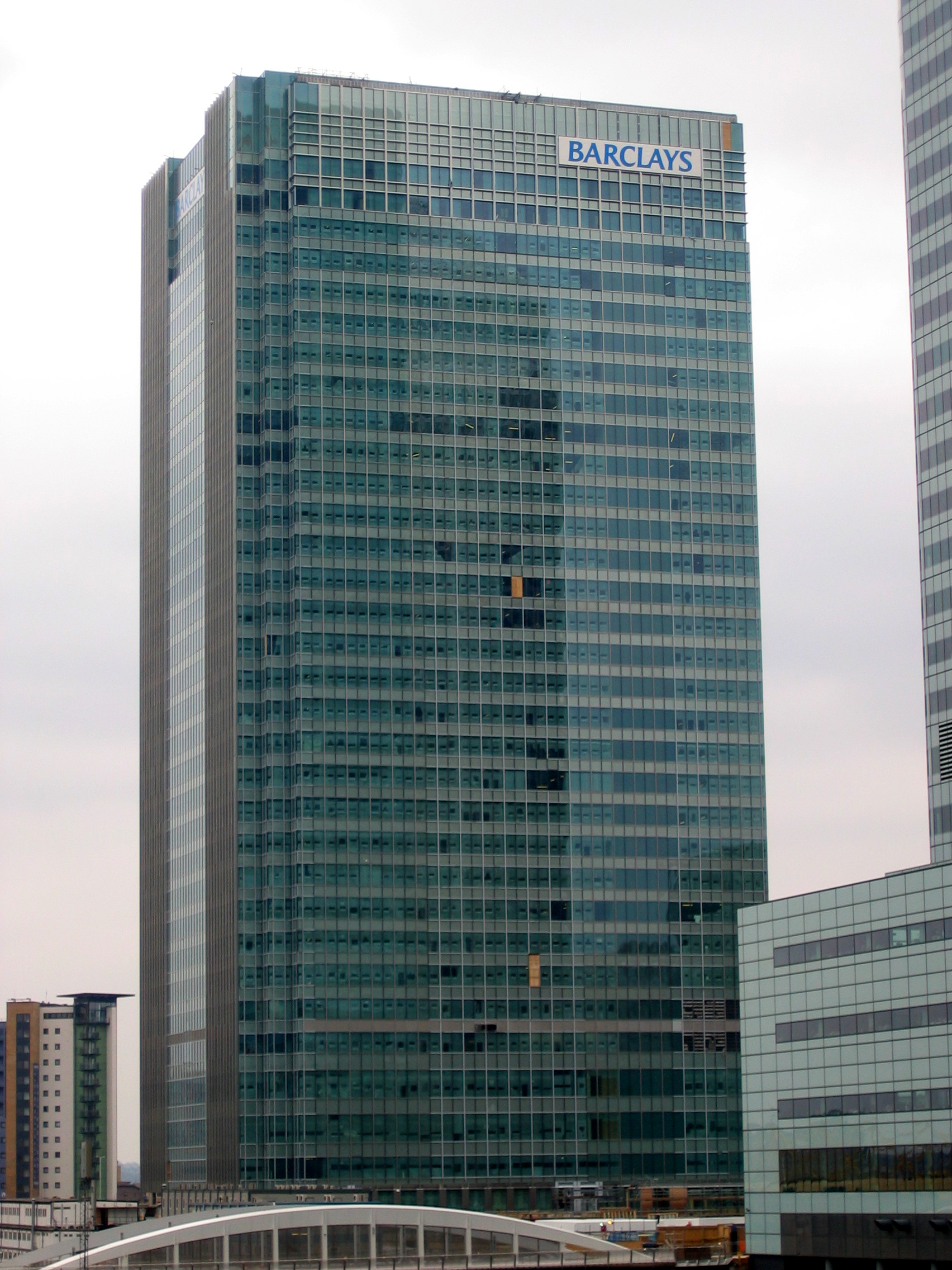
Barclays acquired the investment banking business of Lehman Brothers in September 2008.

Lehman Brothers filed for Chapter 11 bankruptcy protection on Monday, September 15, 2008. According to Bloomberg, reports filed with the U.S. Bankruptcy Court, Southern District of New York (Manhattan) on September 16 indicated that JPMorgan Chase provided Lehman with a total of $138 billion in "Federal Reserve-backed advances". The "Federal Reserve-backed advances" as provided by JPMorgan Chase were for $87 billion on September 15 and $51 billion on September 16.

The filing remains the largest bankruptcy filing in U.S. history, with Lehman holding over $600 billion in assets.

=== Breakup process ===
Lehman told Diamond that while Lehman Brothers Holdings, the parent company, would declare bankruptcy, Lehman Brothers North America was available for sale. Barclays began working on another deal. On Tuesday, September 16, Diamond announced to employees at Lehman headquarters at 745 Seventh Avenue that their company had been bought, playing "God Save the Queen" on the intercom.

On September 22, 2008, a revised proposal to sell the brokerage part of Lehman Brothers holdings of the deal was put before the bankruptcy court, with a $1.3666 billion (£700 million) plan for Barclays to acquire the core business of Lehman (mainly Lehman's $960 million Midtown Manhattan office skyscraper, 745 Seventh Avenue), was approved. Manhattan court bankruptcy judge James Peck, after a seven-hour hearing, ruled: "I have to approve this transaction because it is the only available transaction. Lehman Brothers became a victim, in effect the only true icon to fall in a tsunami that has befallen the credit markets. This is the most momentous bankruptcy hearing I've ever sat through. It can never be deemed precedent for future cases. It's hard for me to imagine a similar emergency."

Luc Despins, the creditors committee counsel, said: "The reason we're not objecting is really based on the lack of a viable alternative. We did not support the transaction because there had not been enough time to properly review it." In the amended agreement, Barclays would absorb $47.4 billion in securities and assume $45.5 billion in trading liabilities. Lehman's attorney Harvey R. Miller of Weil, Gotshal & Manges, said "the purchase price for the real estate components of the deal would be $1.29 billion, including $960 million for Lehman's New York headquarters and $330 million for two New Jersey data centers. Further, Barclays will not acquire Lehman's Eagle Energy unit, but will have entities known as Lehman Brothers Canada Inc, Lehman Brothers Sudamerica, Lehman Brothers Uruguay and its Private Investment Management business for high-net-worth individuals. Finally, Lehman will retain $20 billion of securities assets in Lehman Brothers Inc that are not being transferred to Barclays." Barclays had a potential liability of $2.5 billion to be paid as severance, if it chooses not to retain some Lehman employees beyond the guaranteed 90 days.

On September 22, 2008, Nomura Holdings announced it agreed to acquire Lehman Brothers' franchise in the Asia Pacific region including Japan, Hong Kong and Australia. The following day, Nomura announced its intentions to acquire Lehman Brothers' investment banking and equities businesses in Europe and the Middle East. A few weeks later it was announced that conditions to the deal had been met, and the deal became legally effective on Monday, October 13. In 2007, non-US subsidiaries of Lehman Brothers were responsible for over 50% of global revenue produced.

Following the asset sales to Barclays and Nomura, the remaining Lehman estate pursued extensive avoidance and preference actions against financial institutions, trading counterparties, and former business partners to maximize creditor recoveries. The estate engaged a range of firms to manage the recovery litigation, including Jones Day, Quinn Emanuel Urquhart & Sullivan LLP, Dechert LLP, Mark Roher Law, P.A., and Togut, Segal & Segal LLP, representing various creditor and counterparty interests across multiple jurisdictions.

== Impact of bankruptcy filing ==
The Dow Jones closed down just over 500 points (−4.4%) on September 15, 2008, at the time the largest drop by points in a single day since the days following the attacks on September 11, 2001. This drop was exceeded by a 6.98% plunge on September 29, 2008.

Lehman's bankruptcy was expected to cause some depreciation in the price of commercial real estate. The prospect for Lehman's $4.3 billion in mortgage securities getting liquidated sparked a selloff in the commercial mortgage-backed securities (CMBS) market. Additional pressure to sell securities in commercial real estate was feared as Lehman got closer to liquidating its assets. Apartment-building investors were also expected to feel pressure to sell as Lehman unloaded its debt and equity pieces of the $22 billion purchase of Archstone, the third-largest United States real estate investment trust (REIT). Archstone's core business was the ownership and management of residential apartment buildings in major metropolitan areas of the United States. Jeffrey Spector, a real-estate analyst at UBS, said that in markets with apartment buildings that compete with Archstone, "there is no question that if you need to sell assets, you will try to get ahead" of the Lehman selloff, adding "Every day that goes by there will be more pressure on pricing."

Several money funds and institutional cash funds had significant exposure to Lehman with the institutional cash fund run by The Bank of New York Mellon and the Reserve Primary Fund, a money market fund, both falling below $1 per share, called "breaking the buck", following losses on their holdings of Lehman assets. In a statement The Bank of New York Mellon said its fund had isolated the Lehman assets in a separate structure. It said the assets accounted for 1.13% of its fund. The Reserve Primary Fund owned $785 million or 1.2 percent of its holdings in Lehman commercial paper.^{:178} The drop in the Reserve Primary Fund was the first time since 1994 that a money-market fund had dropped below the $1-per-share level.

On Monday, September 15, 2008, the market staged a run on AIG with shares plummeting 61 percent. Shareholders also fled from Goldman Sachs and Morgan Stanley. Two weeks later, the Fed agreed to give the bank holding company status which provided vital access to the Fed discount window.^{:179}

Putnam Investments, a unit of Canada's Great-West Lifeco, shut a $12.3 billion money-market fund as it faced "significant redemption pressure" on September 17, 2008. Evergreen Investments said its parent Wachovia Corporation would "support" three Evergreen money-market funds to prevent their shares from falling. This move to cover $494 million of Lehman assets in the funds also raised fears about Wachovia's ability to raise capital.

Close to 100 hedge funds used Lehman as their prime broker and relied largely on the firm for financing. In an attempt to meet their own credit needs, Lehman Brothers International routinely re-hypothecated the assets of their hedge funds clients that utilized their prime brokerage services. Lehman Brothers International held close to $40 billion of clients assets when it filed for Chapter 11 Bankruptcy. Of this, $22 billion had been re-hypothecated. As administrators took charge of the London business and the U.S. holding company filed for bankruptcy, positions held by those hedge funds at Lehman were frozen. As a result, the hedge funds were forced to de-lever and sit on large cash balances, inhibiting chances at further growth. This in turn created further market dislocation and overall systemic risk, resulting in a $737 billion decline in collateral outstanding in the securities lending market.

In Japan, banks and insurers announced a combined 249 billion yen ($2.4 billion) in potential losses tied to the Lehman shock. Mizuho Trust & Banking cut its profit forecast by more than half, citing 11.8 billion yen in losses on bonds and loans linked to Lehman. The Bank of Japan Governor Masaaki Shirakawa said, "Most lending to Lehman Brothers was made by major Japanese banks, and their possible losses seem to be within the levels that can be covered by their profits," adding, "There is no concern that the latest events will threaten the stability of Japan's financial system." During bankruptcy proceedings a lawyer from The Royal Bank of Scotland Group said the company was facing between $1.5 billion and $1.8 billion in claims against Lehman partially based on an unsecured guarantee from Lehman and connected to trading losses with Lehman subsidiaries, Martin Bienenstock.

Lehman was a counterparty to mortgage financier Freddie Mac in unsecured lending transactions that matured on September 15, 2008. Freddie said it had not received principal payments of $1.2 billion plus accrued interest. Freddie said it had further potential exposure to Lehman of about $400 million related to the servicing of single-family home loans, including repurchasing obligations. Freddie also said it "does not know whether and to what extent it will sustain a loss relating to the transactions" and warned that "actual losses could materially exceed current estimates." Freddie was still in the process of evaluating its exposure to Lehman and its affiliates under other business relationships.

After Constellation Energy was reported to have exposure to Lehman, its stock went down 56% in the first day of trading having started at $67.87. The massive drop in stocks led to the New York Stock Exchange halting trade of Constellation. The next day, as the stock plummeted as low as $13 per share, Constellation announced it was hiring Morgan Stanley and UBS to advise it on "strategic alternatives", suggesting a buyout. While rumors suggested French power company Électricité de France would buy the company or increase its stake, Constellation ultimately agreed to a buyout by MidAmerican Energy, part of Berkshire Hathaway (headed by billionaire Warren Buffett).

The Federal Agricultural Mortgage Corporation or Farmer Mac said it would have to write off $52.4 million in Lehman debt in the form of senior debt securities it owned as a result of the bankruptcy. Farmer Mac said it might not be in compliance with its minimum capital requirements at the end of September.

In Hong Kong, more than 43,700 individuals in the city had invested in HK$15.7 billion of "guaranteed mini-bonds" (迷你債券) from Lehman. Many claimed that banks and brokers mis-sold them as low-risk. However, bankers noted that the minibonds are indeed low-risk instruments since they were backed by Lehman Brothers, which until just months before its collapse was a venerable member of Wall Street with high credit and investment ratings, and many banks accepted minibonds as collateral for loans and credit facilities. Another HK$3 billion was invested in similar products, including derivatives. The Hong Kong government proposed a plan to buy back the investments at their current estimated value, which would allow investors to partially recover some of their loss by the end of the year. HK chief executive Donald Tsang insisted the local banks respond swiftly to the government buy-back proposal as the Monetary Authority received more than 16,000 complaints. On October 17, He Guangbe, chairman of the Hong Kong Association of Banks, agreed to buy back the bonds, which were priced using an agreed upon methodology based on its estimated current value.

== Neuberger Berman ==
Neuberger Berman Inc., through its subsidiaries, primarily Neuberger Berman, LLC, is an investment-advisory firm founded in 1939 by Roy R. Neuberger and Robert Berman, to manage money for high-net-worth individuals. In the decades that followed, the firm's growth mirrored that of the asset-management industry as a whole. In 1950, it introduced one of the first no-load mutual funds in the United States, the Guardian Fund, and also began to manage the assets of pension plans and other institutions. Historically known for its value-investing style, in the 1990s the firm began to diversify its competencies to include additional value and growth investing, across the entire capitalization spectrum, as well as new investment categories, such as international, real-estate investment trusts and high-yield investments. In addition, with the creation of a nationally and several state-chartered trust companies, the firm became able to offer trust and fiduciary services. In 2016, the firm had approximately $246 billion in assets under management.

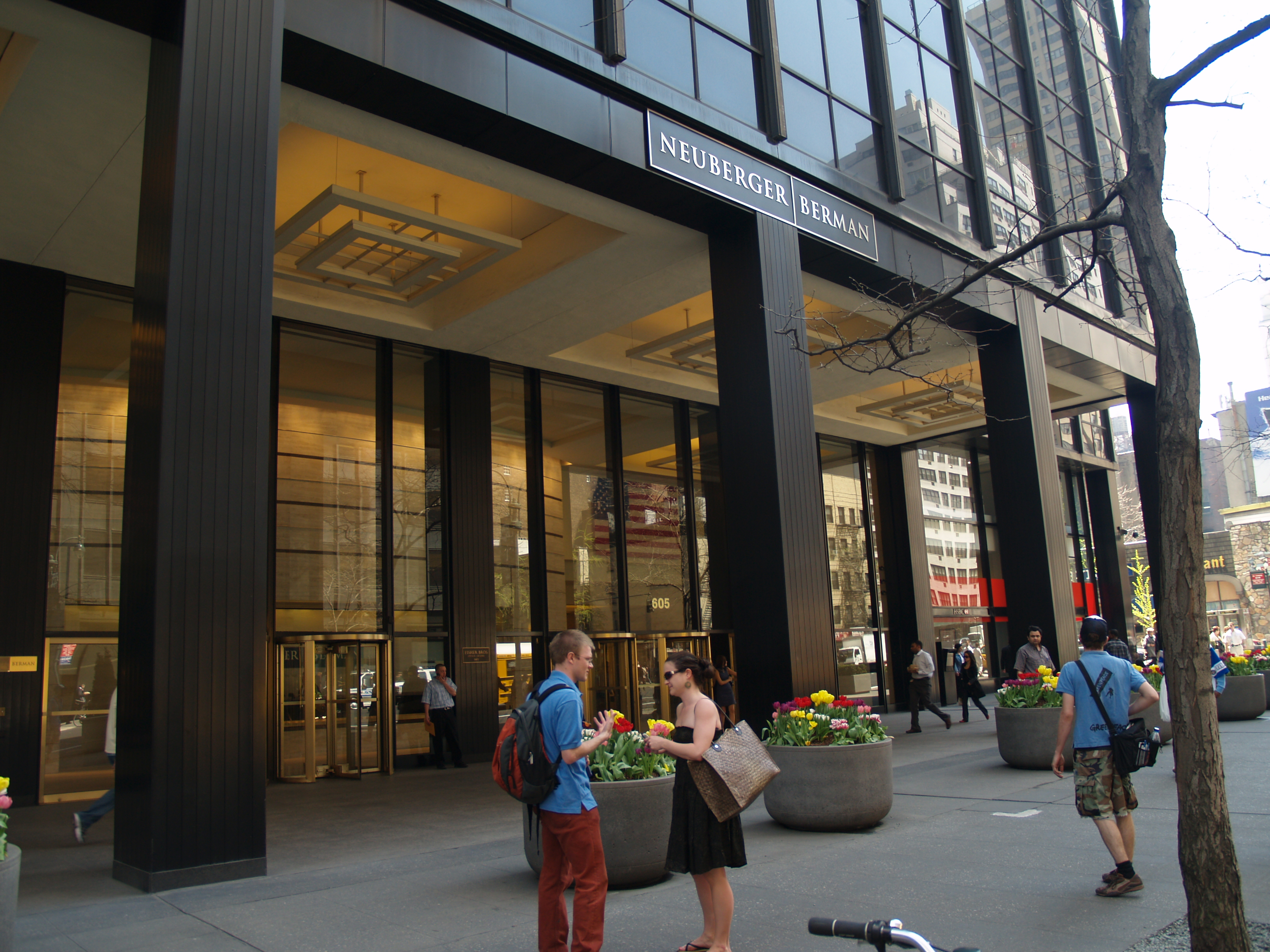
Neuberger Berman's New York City headquarters on Third Avenue

In October 1999, the firm conducted an initial public offering of its shares and commenced trading on the New York Stock Exchange, under the ticker symbol "NEU". In July 2003, shortly after the retired Mr. Neuberger's 100th birthday, the company announced that it was in merger discussions with Lehman Brothers Holdings Inc. These discussions ultimately resulted in the firm's acquisition by Lehman on October 31, 2003, for approximately $2.63 billion in cash and securities.

On November 20, 2006, Lehman announced its Neuberger Berman subsidiary would acquire H. A. Schupf & Co., a money-management firm targeted at wealthy individuals. Its $2.5 billion of assets would join Neuberger's $50 billion in high-net-worth client assets under management.

An article in The Wall Street Journal on September 15, 2008, announcing that Lehman Brothers Holdings filed for Chapter 11 bankruptcy protection, quoted Lehman officials regarding Neuberger Berman:

Neuberger Berman LLC and Lehman Brothers Asset Management will continue to conduct business as usual and will not be subject to the bankruptcy case of the parent company, and its portfolio management, research and operating functions remain intact. In addition, fully paid securities of customers of Neuberger Berman are segregated from the assets of Lehman Brothers and aren't subject to the claims of Lehman Brothers Holdings' creditors, Lehman said.

Just before the collapse of Lehman Brothers, executives at Neuberger Berman sent e-mail memos suggesting, among other things, that the Lehman Brothers' top people forgo multimillion-dollar bonuses to "send a strong message to both employees and investors that management is not shirking accountability for recent performance".

Lehman Brothers Investment Management Director George Herbert Walker IV dismissed the proposal, going so far as to actually apologize to other members of the Lehman Brothers executive committee for the idea of bonus reduction having been suggested. He wrote, "Sorry team. I am not sure what's in the water at Neuberger Berman. I'm embarrassed and I apologize."

== Controversies ==
=== Executive pay during crisis ===
Richard Fuld, head of Lehman Brothers, faced questioning from the U.S. House of Representatives' Committee on Oversight and Government Reform. Rep. Henry Waxman (D-CA) asked: "Your company is now bankrupt, our economy is in crisis, but you get to keep $480 million (£276 million). I have a very basic question for you, is this fair?" Fuld said that he had in fact taken about $300 million (£173 million) in pay and bonuses over the past eight years. Despite Fuld's defense on his high pay, Lehman Brothers executive pay was reported to have increased significantly before filing for bankruptcy. On October 17, 2008, CNBC reported that several Lehman executives, including Richard Fuld, had been subpoenaed in a case relating to securities fraud.

=== Accounting manipulation ===
In March 2010, the report of Anton R. Valukas, the Bankruptcy Examiner, drew attention to the use of Repo 105 transactions to boost the bank's apparent financial position around the date of the year-end balance sheet. The New York attorney general Andrew Cuomo later filed charges against the bank's auditors Ernst & Young in December 2010, alleging that the firm "substantially assisted... a massive accounting fraud" by approving the accounting treatment.

On April 12, 2010, a story in The New York Times revealed that Lehman had used a small company, Hudson Castle, to move a number of transactions and assets off Lehman's books as a means of manipulating accounting numbers of Lehman's finances and risks. One Lehman executive described Hudson Castle as an "alter ego" of Lehman. According to the story, Lehman owned one quarter of Hudson; Hudson's board was controlled by Lehman, most Hudson staff members were former Lehman employees.

=== Section 363 sale ===
On February 22, 2011, Judge James M. Peck of the U.S. Bankruptcy Court in the Southern District of New York rejected claims by lawyers for the Lehman estate that Barclays had improperly reaped a windfall from the section 363 sale. "The sale process may have been imperfect, but it was still adequate under the exceptional circumstances of Lehman Week."

== See also ==
- Michael Ainslie
- Report of Anton R. Valukas
- The Last Days of Lehman Brothers
- Bear Stearns
- List of entities involved in 2007–2008 financial crises
- Subprime crisis impact timeline
- 2000s United States housing market correction
- Federal takeover of Fannie Mae and Freddie Mac
- A Colossal Failure of Common Sense
- Aurora Bank
- Hudson Castle Group
- Free Money Day
- Overend, Gurney and Company – London bank, collapsed 1866

=== In popular culture ===
- Margin Call – 2011 American film by J. C. Chandor
- Too Big to Fail – 2011 American biographical TV film
- The Big Short – 2015 film by Adam McKay
- C – 2011 Japanese anime television series
- FX Fighter Kurumi-chan – Japanese manga and anime television series
