= Harvey R. Miller =

American lawyer

Harvey Robert Miller
- Born: March 1, 1933; Gravesend, Brooklyn, New York
- Died: April 27, 2015 (aged 82); Manhattan, New York
- Education: Brooklyn College; Columbia Law School
- Occupation: Lawyer
- Employer: Weil, Gotshal & Manges

Harvey Robert Miller (March 1, 1933 – April 27, 2015) was an American lawyer. The New York Times called him "the most prominent bankruptcy lawyer in the nation." Born in New York City, Miller graduated from Brooklyn College (A.B., 1954) and Columbia University (LL.B., 1959), and was admitted to the bar in New York State in 1959.

Miller was a partner in the New York City international law firm of Weil, Gotshal & Manges, LLP where he was a member of the firm's management committee for over 25 years and created and developed the firm's Business Finance & Restructuring department specializing in reorganizing distressed business entities. From September 2002 to March 2007, he was a managing director and vice chairman of Greenhill & Co., a boutique investment bank.

Miller represented the bankruptcy estate of Lehman Brothers.

Miller died in 2015 of amyotrophic lateral sclerosis, aged 82.
