= G. Philip Stephenson =

American businessman, philanthropist, and ocean conservationist

- Born: March 1965 (age 60–61)
- Education: The Kinkaid School; Harvard College (BA); Harvard Law School (JD)
- Occupations: businessman, philanthropist, ocean conservationist

G. Philip Stephenson (born March 1965) is an American businessman, philanthropist, and ocean conservationist. He is Chairman of the Freedom Group, a set of companies focused on portfolio investing, real estate and hotel development. Mr. Stephenson lives in Northern Virginia.

== Early life ==
Stephenson grew up in Houston, Texas, where he graduated from The Kinkaid School in 1983. He received a magna cum laude BA degree in government from Harvard College in 1986 and a J.D. magna cum laude from Harvard Law School in 1990.

== Career ==
After graduating from law school, Stephenson practiced corporate law in the Washington DC office of Baker & Botts (1990–1991). After briefly serving as a Schedule C appointee in the US Treasury (1991–1993), he founded and served as a General Partner of International Equity Partners (IEP), an investment firm specializing in Asian and East European markets (1993–2001). After selling IEP, he became a shareholder in and Vice Chairman of the Rompetrol Group, a large multinational oil refining and marketing company headquartered in the Netherlands. He sold his entire stake in the Rompetrol Group in late 2007.

== Personal life ==
Stephenson is married and has three children. He serves on nonprofit boards, including National Geographic's Pristine Seas advisory board and the Board of International Counselors at the Center for Strategic and International Studies ("CSIS"). In 2005, he created a foundation that has promoted the exploration and protection of the ocean, including the creation of marine protected areas, local education, and coral restoration.

Stephenson is a member of the Explorers Club and, as an avid sailor, of the New York Yacht Club.

== Freedom Group ==
Stephenson is Chairman of the Freedom Group, whose companies focus on portfolio investing, real estate, and hotel development. Freedom Capital Partners LLC (FCP) is a family office that makes and monitors public and private investments globally. FCP does not manage money for third parties. Freedom Development LLC owns and operates (with partners) multifamily residential housing in the Washington DC metropolitan area. Freedom Resorts Ltd purchased the freehold private island of Petit St. Vincent in St. Vincent and the Grenadines in 2010 and operates the award-winning 22-room boutique hotel there.

- Petit St. Vincent is an eco-friendly boutique resort In 2014 Jean Michel Cousteau opened a diving center on the island.
- The Philip Stephenson Foundation is a 501(c) (3) foundation which promotes ocean exploration and protection. The foundation's commitments include:
  - National Geographic Society "Pristine Seas" program
  - The Nature Conservancy's program in the Eastern Caribbean,
  - Dr. Robert Ballard's 'Ocean Exploration Trust'
  - Dr. Sylvia Earle's "Mission Blue/Hopespots"

Stephenson also serves on the National Geographic Society and International Council of Advisors.
