= Anton R. Valukas =

American lawyer

Anton Valukas

United States Attorney for the Northern District of Illinois
- In office 1985–1989
- President: Ronald Reagan
- Preceded by: Dan Webb
- Succeeded by: Fred Foreman

Personal details
- Born: 1943 (age 82–83)
- Education: Lawrence University (BA); Northwestern University (JD)

Anton R. Valukas (born 1943) is an American attorney who served as the United States Attorney for the Northern District of Illinois from 1985 to 1989. In 2007, he became the chairman of Jenner & Block. He was later appointed bankruptcy examiner during the bankruptcy of Lehman Brothers.

== Early life and education ==
Valukas is the son of Anton J. Valukas, a former Illinois Circuit Court judge. His grandfather, Anton Kasmir, migrated to the United States from Lithuania. He attended Lawrence University, graduating in 1965, and Northwestern University School of Law, graduating in 1968. He was admitted to the bar of Illinois in 1968.

== Career ==
Valukas became an Assistant United States Attorney in 1970. In 1974, he became Chief of the Special Prosecutions Division of the United States Department of Justice. Then, in 1975–76, he served as First Assistant United States Attorney. In addition to his duties at the Department of Justice, from 1972 to 1976, Valukas was an instructor at the John Marshall Law School.

A Republican, Valukas left the DOJ in 1976 when Jimmy Carter assumed office as President of the United States. Valukas joined Jenner & Block as a partner at this time. He also served as an adjunct professor at the Northwestern University School of Law from 1980 to 1982.

In 1985, President Ronald Reagan appointed Valukas as United States Attorney for the Northern District of Illinois. The most notable event of Valukas' four-year term as United States Attorney was Operation Greylord, an investigation into judicial corruption in Cook County, Illinois that ultimately resulted in the indictment of 92 people, including 17 judges.

At the end of his term as United States Attorney, in 1989, Valukas returned to Jenner & Block. There, his practice has focused on white collar criminal defense. He also tutored three young men from Chicago's projects, all of whom earned college degrees.

In 2009, Valukas was appointed bankruptcy examiner in the bankruptcy of Lehman Brothers. His Examiner's report was released to the public in March 2010.
