= Report of Anton R. Valukas =

Report on causes of Lehman brothers bankruptcy

The Report of Anton R. Valukas is an examination of the bankruptcy of Lehman Brothers during the 2008 financial crisis. Anton Valukas, chairman of the Chicago law firm Jenner & Block, was appointed by a bankruptcy court in New York in early 2009 to report on the causes of the Lehman bankruptcy.

With fellow authors, he produced a 2,200-page document detailing their views on the inner workings of Lehman Brothers, and possible avenues for proceedings against culpable directors and shareholders. The Valukas Report was made public following applications to the court on March 11, 2010.

== Outline ==
=== Section I Executive Summary ===
Introduction

Lehman failed for a variety of reasons and the responsibility for the failure is shared by management, Lehman's high-risk investment bank business model and the failure of government oversight. However, all of these problems were compounded by the actions of the executives. Some were simple errors in business judgement, but others were deliberate balance sheet manipulation.

Lehman's business model rewarded excessive risk-taking and high-leverage. Near the end Lehman had $700 billion in assets but only $25 billion (about 3.5%) in equity. Furthermore, most of the assets were long-lived or matured in over a year but liabilities were due in less than a year. Lehman had to borrow and repay billions of dollars through the "repo" market every day in order to remain in business. This was considered normal for investment banks, but if counterparties lost confidence in Lehman's ability to repay, this market would close to the bank and the business would fail.

Lehman's management did not foresee the depths of the sub-prime residential mortgage crisis, nor its broad-reaching effects on other markets. Instead they elected to "double-down" their bets, expecting to make high profits when the market "came back".

Bear Stearns' March 2008 failure revealed the flaws of both the at-that-time-typical investment bank model as well as the deepening sub-prime crisis. Counterparty confidence in Lehman began to decline and the executives felt they needed to manipulate their financial statements in order to halt further erosion. Lehman focused on the leverage ratio (debt-to-equity) and liquidity as metrics most watched by counterparties and credit rating agencies.

In the second quarter of 2008 Lehman tried to cushion reported losses by claiming improved leverage and liquidity. What Lehman failed to report was that they had used an accounting trick (known within Lehman as "Repo 105") to manage their balance sheet. Normal repo transactions consisted of selling assets with the obligation of repurchase within a few days. Considered a financing event, these "sold" items stayed on the bank's balance sheet. Repo 105 made use of an accounting rule where, if the assets sold were valued at more than 105% of cash received, the transaction could be called a true sale and the assets removed from Lehman's books. $50 billion of assets were removed from the balance sheet in this way, improving their net leverage ratio from 13.9 to 12.1 at the time.

Multiple sources from the time note there was no substance to transaction except to remove unwanted assets, a significant violation of generally accepted accounting principles in the United States. Ernst & Young, Lehman's auditors, were aware of Repo 105 and the non-disclosure of its scope.

Regarding liquidity, throughout 2008 Lehman made false claims of having billions of dollars in available cash to repay counterparties when in reality, significant portions of the reported amounts were in fact encumbered or otherwise unavailable for use. September 12, 2008, 2 days after reporting $41 billion in liquidity, true available funds totaled only $2 billion. Lehman filed for bankruptcy on September 15.

Summarized Conclusions

While the business decisions that brought about the crisis were largely within the realm of acceptable business judgement, the actions to manipulate financial statements do give rise to "colorable claims", especially against the CEO and CFOs but also against the auditors.

In the opinion of the Examiner, "colorable" is generally meant to mean that sufficient evidence exists to support legal action and possible recovery of losses.

Repo 105 was not inherently improper, but its use here violated accounting principles that require all legitimate transactions to have a business purpose. Repo 105 solely existed to manipulate financial information.

In a written letter in June 2008, Lehman Senior VP Matthew Lee advised the auditors and Audit Committee that he thought Repo 105 was being used improperly. The auditors failed to advise the Audit Committee about issues raised by this whistle-blower despite specific requests by the Committee. Auditors "Ernst & Young" failed to investigate the allegations and likely failed to meet professional standards.

=== Appendices ===
- Volume 6- Appendix 1
- Volume 7- Appendices 2 - 7
- Volume 8- Appendices 8 - 22
- Volume 9- Appendices 23 - 34

== Consequences ==
Following consideration of the report, the Accountancy and Actuarial Discipline Board announced an investigation into Ernst & Young's role in the bank's collapse.

== See also ==
- Re Barings plc (No 5) [1999] 1 BCLC 433
- Lehman Brothers
- Repo 105
- US corporate law
