= Joseph M. Gregory =

American chief operating officer

Joseph M. Gregory (born 29 February 1952) is an American former investment banker. Gregory held the last President/COO position of investment bank Lehman Brothers Holdings Inc, before their bankruptcy in September 2008. After working for Lehman for 30 years, not much news has emanated about any new business activities as of 2018.
