= Allan Corduner =

British actor (born 1950)

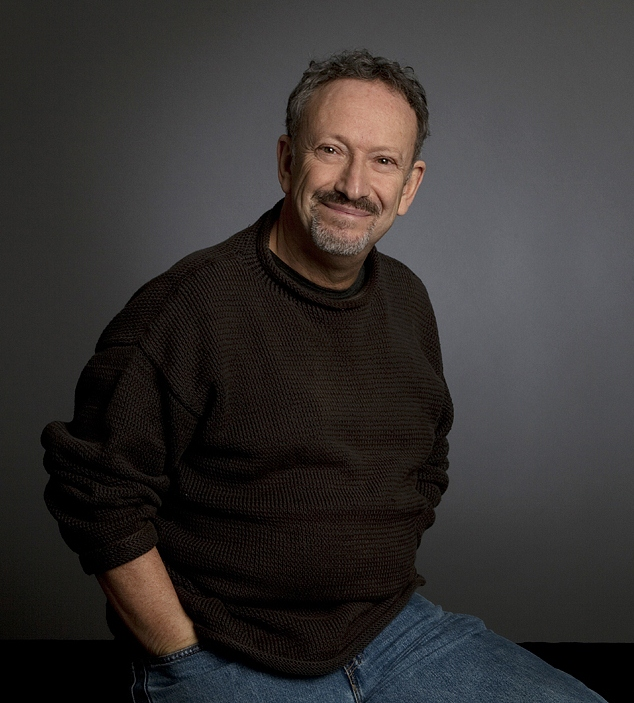
- Corduner in 2012
- Born: 2 April 1950 (age 76); Stockholm, Sweden
- Years active: 1973–present
- Spouse: Juha Leppäjärvi (m. 2013)

Allan Corduner (/kɔːrˈdjuːnər/; born 2 April 1950) is a British actor. Born in Stockholm to a German mother and a Ukrainian-Finnish father, Corduner grew up in a secular Jewish home in London. After earning a BA (Hons) in English and Drama at Bristol University he trained at the Bristol Old Vic Theatre School. He has worked extensively on stage, TV, and film, both in the UK and in the United States. His voice is familiar from many BBC radio plays, audio books and TV documentaries.

Corduner made his feature film debut in Yentl, with Barbra Streisand and Mandy Patinkin. Of his 44 films, he is perhaps best known for his portrayal of Sir Arthur Sullivan in Mike Leigh's Topsy-Turvy. He also voiced Gehrman the first hunter in the 2015 video game Bloodborne.

== Early life ==
Corduner grew up in a secular Jewish home in North London with his parents and younger brother. His mother had escaped to Great Britain from Nazi Germany with her family in 1938. His father was born in Helsinki, Finland, of a Finnish-born mother and a Ukrainian-born father. Corduner's parents first settled in Stockholm, where he was born, but the family moved to London when he was one year old.

Corduner's early ambition was to become either an orchestra conductor or a concert pianist. He attended University College School in Hampstead, London. Although a skilled jazz and classical pianist, musical aspirations had taken second place by the time he went to study at Bristol University and the Bristol Old Vic Theatre School.

== Career ==
Corduner has worked extensively in theatre in London's West End and on Broadway, television as well as in film. He has also appeared in several BBC Radio plays including The Resistible Rise of Arturo Ui, Insignificance, and Fanny and Alexander.

His voice is familiar to listeners of audio books including The Book Thief. TV appearances include Bookish, Call The Midwife, Midsomer Murders,and as Andrea Verrocchio in seasons 1 and 2 of the Starz original series Da Vinci's Demons. He appeared on seasons 5 and 6 of the Showtime TV series Homeland.

After drama school, Corduner's first two years as a professional actor were spent at Newcastle Repertory Theatre. Spells at the Birmingham Rep and the Actors' Company followed, until Corduner returned to London to make his West End debut in Mary O'Malley's Once a Catholic at the Wyndham's Theatre. Corduner has appeared several times at the Royal Court Theatre, in plays such as Three Birds Alighting on a Field, Fucking Games, Ice Cream, and most notably Caryl Churchill's satirical Serious Money, which subsequently transferred to London's West End and Broadway in New York City.

He garnered acclaim on Broadway for the role of Etches in the musical Titanic. In February 2014, he played Etches again in a one-off concert version of Titanic at Avery Fisher Hall (now David Geffen Hall) in New York City, re-uniting him with the original cast of the musical. He played Fritz Litten in Mark Hayhurst's Taken at Midnight, first at Chichester Festival Theatre, and subsequently at Theatre Royal Haymarket in West End.

One of his first film roles was in Yentl in 1982, with Barbra Streisand. He is probably best known for his portrayal of Sir Arthur Sullivan in Mike Leigh's Topsy-Turvy (1999), his first leading role in a feature film. Corduner's film work spans a variety of genres, such as action-adventure (Defiance), horror comedy (Burke and Hare), and western (Medicine Men). Recent films include Woman in Gold (2015) and Tár (2022).

=== Voice acting ===
Corduner's voice is familiar to listeners of BBC radio plays such as Insignificance, The Resistible Rise of Arturo Ui and Fanny and Alexander. He was also the subject of BBC Radio 3 Private Passions.

Corduner has provided voices for various video game characters, notably the first, second, third and fifth Harry Potter video games (namely as, among others, Severus Snape, Lucius Malfoy, Fillius Flitwick and Argus Filch). He also voiced Apus, the pet parrot belonging to Queen Cassiopeia, the primary antagonist, for the English version of Ni no Kuni: Wrath of the White White which was released in February 2013. In 2015, Corduner voiced Gehrman, the First Hunter in Bloodborne.

=== Audiobooks and narration ===
Corduner is also known for solo narration of TV documentaries such as Fish Warrior for the National Geographic Channel and various audiobooks for Simply Audiobooks, notably The Book Thief and Inkdeath. He also narrated Magyk written by Angie Sage and produced by Harper Audio. He has received two Earphones Awards by AudioFile.

== Personal life ==
Corduner was born in Stockholm but grew up in London. His mother was from Germany and his father from Finland.

Corduner and his partner Juha Leppäjärvi met in 2006 in London, forming their civil partnership in December 2009 and marrying in New York City in August 2013.

== Filmography ==
=== Film ===
Year	Title	Role	Notes
1972	Savage Messiah	Newspaper Vendor	Uncredited
1979	Phoelix		
1981	Sredni Vashtar	Mortimer	Short film
1982	The Return of the Soldier	Pianist	
1983	Yentl	Shimmele	
1985	Bad Medicine	Dr. Diaz the Bus Driver	
1986	Valhalla	Loke	English version, Voice only
1987	Hearts of Fire	Music Executive	
1988	Talk Radio	Vince	
1989	Fat Man and Little Boy	Franz Goethe	
1991	Edward II	Poet	
1992	Carry On Columbus	Sam	
1994	A Business Affair	Dinner Guest	
1995	Voices	Oscar Butterworth	
1996	Indian Summer	Therapist	
1996	Soup	Einstein	Short film
1998	The Impostors	Captain	
1999	Topsy-Turvy	Arthur Sullivan	
2000	Joe Gould's Secret	Francis McCrudden	
2000	Gladiator	Trainer	
2001	Zoe	Rupert	
2001	Kiss Kiss (Bang Bang)	Big Bob	
2001	Me Without You	Max	
2001	The Grey Zone	Miklós Nyiszli	
2001	The Search for John Gissing	Francois "Fuller" Feulliere	
2002	Food of Love	Joseph Mansourian	
2002	Moonlight Mile	Stan Michaels	
2002	The King's Beard		Voice role
2004	De-Lovely	Monty Woolley	
2004	The Merchant of Venice	Tubal	
2004	Vera Drake	Psychiatrist	
2005	Bigger Than the Sky	Kippy Newberg	
2005	A Higher Agency	Manager	Short film
2005	Against Nature	Des Esseintes	Short film
2005	The White Countess	Samuel Feinstein	
2007	The Waiting Room	Fiona's Dad	
2007	Fred Claus	Dr. Goldfarb	
2008	Defiance	Shimon Haretz	
2009	Mr. Nobody	Dr. Feldheim	
2010	Burke & Hare	Nicéphore Niépce	
2011	A Thousand Kisses Deep	Buddy	
2012	An Enemy To Die For	Martin	
2012	47 Orchard Street	Hirsch	Short film
2012	The Sweeney	Doctor	
2013	The Funeral	Rabbi Stephen	Short film
2013	Closer to the Moon	Flaviu	
2014	Amendment	Anthony	Short film
2015	Woman in Gold	Gustav Bloch-Bauer	
2016	Florence Foster Jenkins	John Totten	
2016	The Book of Gabrielle	Saul	
2017	Disobedience	Moshe Hartog	
2018	Miss Dalí	Captain Moore	
2018	Operation Finale	Gideon Hausner	
2022	Mosquito	Ozwald Godfrey	
2022	Tár	Sebastian Brix	
2023	The Offering	Saul	
TBA	Christmas Karma		Post-production
TBA	The Entertainment System Is Down		Post-production

=== Television ===
Year	Title	Role	Notes
1977	Wings	Harris	Episode: "Never Turn Back"
1977	Poldark	Manservant	Episode: "Series 2, Episode 9"
1979	Follow the Star	Shepherd	Television film
1980	Tales of the Unexpected	Store Assistant	Episode: "Mr Botibol's First Love"
1980	Buccaneer	Monty Bateman	Recurring role; 4 episodes
1980	The Onedin Line	Auctioneer	Episode: "Jonah's Luck"
1981	Roots	Melvin Solomons	
1981	Diamonds	Roger Marker	Recurring role; 4 episodes
1983	Maybury	Dr. Walker	Episode: "New Gods for Old: Part 1"
1984	Cold Warrior	Joachim	Episode: "Bright Sting"
1984	Freud	Oscar Rie	Miniseries; 2 episodes
1985	Girls on Top	Benny	Episode: "Hark"
1986	The Collectors	Joe Kalman	Episode: "Go for Gold"
1987	Mandela	Benny	Television film
1987	C.A.T.S. Eyes	Morrish	Episode: "Carrier Pigeon"
1988	Tales of the Unexpected	Hatchard's Bookshop Assistant	Episode: "The Colonel's Lady"
1989	The Fairy Queen	Quince	Television film
1990	ScreenPlay	Stephen Carlinsky	Episode: "Antonia and Jane"
1991	Spatz	Rex	Episode: "Talent Contest"
1992	The Bill	George Quigley	Recurring role; 2 episodes
1992	Boon	Dennis	Episode: "Whispering Grass"
1993	Minder	Marty	Episode: "I'll Never Forget Whats'ername"
1993	Inspector Morse	Gentile Bellocchio	Episode: "Twilight of the Gods"
1993	Teenage Health Freak	Dr. Lime	Recurring role; 2 episodes
1993	Heart of Darkness	Verme	Television film
1994	Headhunters	Saul Karkoff	Episode: "The Golden Hello"
1994	Birdland	Chip Rafferty	Episode: "Plan B"
1994	The Bill	Defence Barrister	Episode: "Backlash"
1994	Paris	Minotti	Series regular; 6 episodes
1994	Nobody's Children	Ion	Television film
1995	An Independent Man	Robert Flower	Episode: "Market Forces"
1996	Norma Jean & Marilyn	Billy Wilder	Television film
1996	Gadgetman	Professor McNeil	Television film
1996	No Bananas	Benjamin Marks	Episode: "Escape"
1996	Mad About You	Osofsky	Episode: "Burt's Building"
1996–1997	Nostromo	Hirsch	Miniseries; 4 episodes
1997	Love in the Ancient World	Member at Platon's Guest Meal	Television film
1998	Drop the Dead Donkey	Art Critic	Recurring role; 2 episodes
1999	Liverpool 1	Alan Pollock	Episode: "Sweet Dreams"
2000–2005	Fat Friends	Leonard Harris	Recurring role; 4 episodes
2001	The Way We Live Now	Croll	Miniseries; 4 episodes
2002	Foyle's War	Carlo Lucciano	Episode: "A Lesson in Murder"
2002	Daniel Deronda	Herr Klesmer	Miniseries; 3 episodes
2003	Trust	Michael Cohen	Miniseries; 1 episode
2004	Heartbeat	Gerard Lowe	Episode: "In the Bleak Midwinter"
2004	The Last Detective	Maurice Leyman	Episode: "Christine"
2004	La Femme Musketeer	Aramis	Television film
2005	The Strange Case of Sherlock Holmes & Arthur Conan Doyle	Herbert Greenhough Smith	Television film
2005	Friends and Crocodiles	Marcus	Television film
2006	Simon Schama's Power of Art	Mark Rothko	Episode: "Rothko"
2007	Rome	Clerk	Episode: "These Being the Words of Marcus Tullius Cicero"
2007	Heartbeat	Tristram Johnstone	Episode: "Seeds of Destruction"
2007	The Whistleblowers	Daniel Black	Episode: "Ghosts"
2007	The Last Days of the Raj	Lord Ismay	Television film
2008	No Heroics	Shopkeeper	Episode: "Supergroupie"
2010	A Passionate Woman	Mr Solomon	Miniseries; 1 episodes
2010	Grandma's House	Richard	Episode: "The Day Simon Felt the Family Was Ready to Be Healed"
2010	Lennon Naked	Arthur Janov	Television film
2011	Zen	Michelangelo Gattuso	Episode: "Cabal"
2011	Exile	Geller	Miniseries; 1 episode
2011	Nazi Underworld	Narrator	Episode: "Hitler's Family"
2012	Midsomer Murders	Michael Hipsman	Episode: "A Rare Bird"
2012	We'll Take Manhattan	Alex Liberman	Television film
2013	Spies of Warsaw	Viktor Rosen	Miniseries; 4 episodes
2013	Dancing on the Edge	Mr. Wax	Miniseries; 5 episodes
2013–2014	Da Vinci's Demons	Andrea Verrocchio	Recurring role; 11 episodes
2014	Utopia	Ross	Recurring role; 2 episodes
2015–2017	Homeland	Etai Luskin	Recurring role; 7 episodes
2016	The Musketeers	Van Laar	Recurring role; 2 episodes
2016	The Collection	Inspector Bompard	Recurring role; 4 episodes
2017	Fearless	Monty Berman	Miniseries; 5 episodes
2018	Call the Midwife	Arnold Gelin	Episode: "Series 7, Episode 1"
2018	FBI	Victor Beniov	Episode: "This Land Is Your Land"
2019	The Blacklist	Aaron Meyers	Episode: "The Corsican (No. 20)"
2021	Ridley Road	Rabbi Leslie Lehrer	Miniseries; 4 episodes
2022	Count Magnus	Deacon	Television film
2024	Dinner with the Parents	Irv Langer	3 episodes
2026	Bookish	Maxie Kleimann	2 episodes
2026	The Lord of the Rings: The Rings of Power	Secret Fire (voice)	Episode: "The Secret Fire"

=== Video games ===
Year	Game	Role	Notes
2001	Harry Potter and the Philosopher's Stone	Argus Filch / Filius Flitwick / Gringotts Goblin / Quirinus Quirrell / Severus Snape	Voice only
2002	Harry Potter and the Chamber of Secrets	Filius Flitwick / Lucius Malfoy / Severus Snape / Argus Filch	Voice only
2004	Harry Potter and the Prisoner of Azkaban	Filius Flitwick / Severus Snape	Voice only
2007	Harry Potter and the Order of the Phoenix	Argus Filch / Severus Snape / Basil Fronsac / Reginald Oddpick	Voice only
2007	Dragon Quest Swords: The Masked Queen and the Tower of Mirrors	Xiphos	English version, voice only
2009	Harry Potter and the Half-Blood Prince	Argus Filch	Voice only
2011	Ni no Kuni: Wrath of the White Witch	Apus	English version, voice only
2014	Transformers Universe	Ironhide	Voice only
2015	Bloodborne	Old Hunter Gehrman	Voice only
2015	Final Fantasy XIV: Heavensward	Eynzahr Slafyrsyn / Midgardsormr	English version, voice only
2018	Call of Cthulhu	James Fitzroy / Additional Voices	Voice only
2020	Assassin's Creed Valhalla	Trygve	Voice only
2021	Bravely Default II	Gwydion	English version, voice only
2021	Final Fantasy XIV: Endwalker	Quintus Cinna	Voice only

== Theatre ==
- Misalliance; Birmingham Rep
- The Amazons; Actor's Company
- The Entertainer; Actor's Company
- Once a Catholic as Cuthbert; Wyndham's Theatre (1977)
- No End of Blame as Grigor; Oxford Playhouse, Oxford & Royal Court Theatre (1981)
- A Midsummer Night's Dream as Puck; Regent's Park Open Air Theatre (1984)
- Serious Money as Durkfeld/Freville Todd/Duckett/Soat/Gleason; Royal Court Theatre & Wyndham's Theatre (1987); Broadway, New York City (1988)
- The Beaux' Stratagem as Scrub; Royal National Theatre (1989)
- Ice Cream as Man in Devon / Shrink / Fellow Guest / Hitcher / Professor; Royal Court Theatre (1989)
- Marya; Old Vic (1989)
- The Boys Next Door; Comedy Theatre (1990)
- Three Birds Alighting on a Field; Royal Court Theatre (1991)
- Rosmersholm as Headmaster Kroll; Young Vic (1992)
- Titanic as Henry Etches; Lunt-Fontanne Theatre, Broadway, New York City (1997)
- The Heart of Art as Arthur Dick; Off-Broadway, New York City (1999)
- Fucking Games as Terence; Royal Court Theatre (2001)
- Comedians as Sammy Samuels; Samuel Beckett Theatre, New York City (2003)
- Two Thousand Years as Danny; Royal National Theatre (2005)
- The Birthday Party as Goldberg; McCarter Theatre, Princeton, United States (2006)
- The Grouch as Alan; West Yorkshire Playhouse, Leeds (2008)
- Born in the Gardens as Maurice; Theatre Royal, Bath (2008)
- Hello, Dolly! as Horace Vandergelder; Regent's Park Open Air Theatre (2009)
- A View from the Bridge as Alfieri; Duke of York's Theatre (2009)
- Passion as Doctor Tambourri; Donmar Warehouse (2010)
- Taken at Midnight as Fritz Litten; Chichester Festival Theatre (2014), Theatre Royal Haymarket (2015)
- Show Boat as Cap'n Andy Hawks; Sheffield Crucible (2015)
- Murder on the Orient Express as Hercule Poirot; McCarter Theatre (2017)
- My Fair Lady as Colonel Pickering; Vivian Beaumont Theater, Broadway, New York City (2018)
- The Motive and the Cue as Hume Cronyn; Noël Coward Theatre, London's West End (2023)

== Audiobooks ==
- Inkdeath
- Magyk
- The Book Thief
- The Castle
- The Keys to the Kingdom
- Smoke
- The Vorrh
- Magpie Murders
- Moonflower Murders
- Good Omens
