= Litten =

Litten is a surname. Notable people with the surname include:

- Derren Litten (born 1970), English comedy writer
- Friedrich Litten (1873–1940), German jurist
- Hans Litten (1903–1938), German lawyer
- Irmgard Litten (1879–1953), German writer
- Moritz Litten (1845–1907), German physician
  - Litten's sign
- Peter Litten (born 1960), English film director
