= Taken at Midnight =

Play by Mark Hayhurst

Taken At Midnight
- Written by: Mark Hayhurst
- Genre: drama
- Setting: Nazi Germany

Premiere
- Date: 2 October 2014
- Place: Chichester Festival Theatre, London

Taken At Midnight is a 2014 play by Mark Hayhurst on the life of Hans Litten, his cross-examination of Adolf Hitler in court in 1931 and his mother's attempts to secure his release after his arrest by the Nazis in 1933. Hayhurst also produced a television drama on the same topic in 2011, entitled The Man Who Crossed Hitler. Taken At Midnight is Hayhurst's theatre debut.

== Production history ==
It premiered in the Minerva Theatre at the Chichester Festival Theatre from 2 October 2014 (previews from 26 September) to 1 November 2014, directed by Jonathan Church and starring Penelope Wilton. It transferred to the Theatre Royal Haymarket in London, opening on 26 January 2015 (previews from 15 January) until 14 March 2015.

It had its North American premiere at the Jedlicka Performing Arts Center, in Cicero, Illinois United States. It ran from February 20th thru March 7th, 2026

== Characters and original cast ==
Hans Litten - Martin Hutson
Irmgard Litten - Penelope Wilton
Carl von Ossietzky - Mike Grady
Erich Mühsam - Pip Donaghy
Dr. Conrad -John Light
Fritz Litten - Allan Corduner
Gustav Hammerman - Marc Antolin
Lord Clifford Allen - David Yelland
SA Officer - Dermot McLaughlin
Hotelier - Christopher Hogben
Hitler's Voice - Roger Allam

Other parts were played by members of the company.

== North American Cast ==
Hans Litten - Henry DelBello
Irmgard Litten - Jeanne Scurek
Carl von Ossietzky -Even Fenne
Erich Mühsam - Phillip Smith
Dr. Conrad - Alex Duty
Fritz Litten - Michael Lomenick
Gustav Hammerman - Felipe Escudero
Lord Clifford Allen - Ryan Christopherson
SA Officer - Reed Hickerson
Hotelier - Ben Sanchez
Hitler's Voice - Micheal Kott

The production was directed by Micheal Kott
