= Pokémon Jet =

Special livery for some Asian Airlines

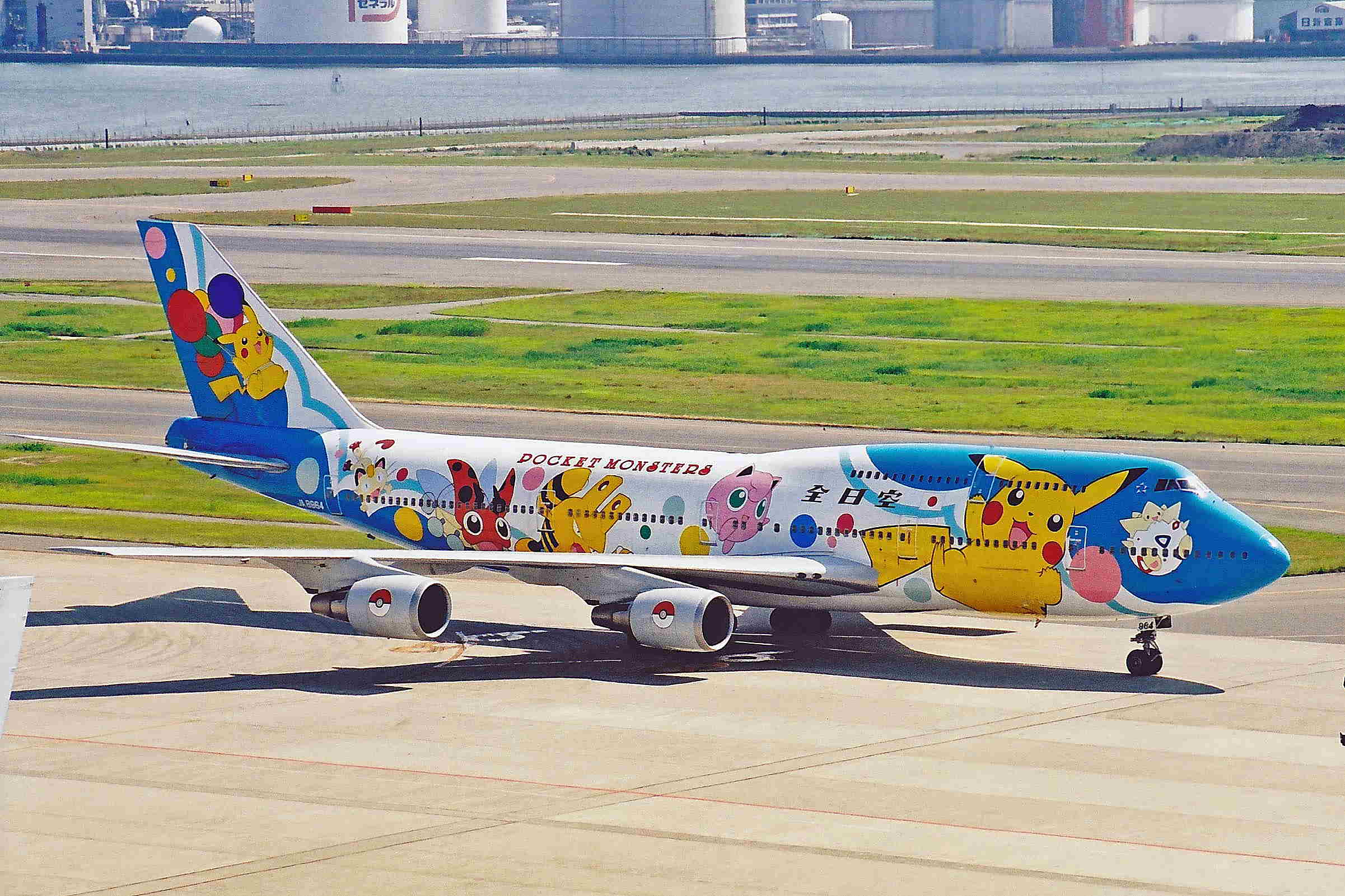
A Pokémon Jet (Boeing 747-400D) of All Nippon Airways, July 2001

Pokémon Jet (ポケモンジェット, Pokemon jetto) refers to a number of aircraft operated by multiple airlines in a promotional Pokémon livery. The exteriors of the aircraft were painted with pictures of various Pokémon and the interiors were decorated with a Pokémon theme. Though the use of these liveries by ANA ended in 2016, the scheme has since been revived, this time with Solaseed Air in 2020, and Air Do and Skymark Airlines in 2021. In 2022, Scoot became the first non-Japanese airline to introduce a Pokémon Jet, followed by China Airlines and T'way Air later that year. In 2023, ANA resumed producing Pokémon Jet liveries for their aircraft after a seven-year absence.

== History ==
After the release of the first Pokémon games for the Nintendo Game Boy in 1996, and the resultant Pokémon-related craze, All Nippon Airways unveiled the first Pokémon Jets on 1 July 1998, timed with the release of Pokémon: The First Movie. The first two to be unveiled were a Boeing 747-400 (JA8965) and a Boeing 767-300 (JA8569), and each displayed a number of the then-151 known Pokémon, including Pikachu. Due to the popularity of the aircraft, a third 767 was unveiled a matter of weeks later. The three aircraft were introduced on numerous domestic flights in Japan.

A fourth, standard Boeing 747-400 (JA8962) was painted in a Pokémon livery in February 1999, and was called the US version by the airline, as it was put into service on the airline's North American network. The aircraft was identical to the previous three aircraft, except the letters ANA were kept on the vertical stabiliser, and operated its first flight to New York City's JFK International Airport on 24 February 1999.

All Nippon Airways announced in March 1999 that a fifth aircraft would be painted in a Pokémon scheme, and a contest was held which saw children between the ages of six and twelve submitting entries. The announcement was timed to coincide with the release of Pokémon: The Movie 2000 in Japan in the summer of 1999. The winning design was rolled out at Osaka on 20 June 1999 on a Boeing 747-400D (JA8964), with the same design appearing shortly thereafter on two Boeing 767-300s (JA8288 and JA8357).

In 2011, a Boeing 777-300 (JA754A) was painted in a Pokémon livery featuring characters from the Pokémon Black and White video games. All Nippon Airways had originally intended to allow children to vote on the livery design for this Pokémon Jet, but the voting event was cancelled as a result of the 2011 Tōhoku earthquake and tsunami. The aircraft has been dubbed the Peace Jet, as the selected livery design is intended to express the wish for a world filled with peace. This Pokémon Jet was placed into service on the airline's domestic network on 18 July 2011, just two days after Victini and the Black Hero: Zekrom and Victini and the White Hero: Reshiram were released at movie theaters in Japan.

On 8 October 2013, JA8956 and JA8957 simultaneously retired as part of the airline's plan to retire all Boeing 747s, leaving JA754A the then-only Pokémon Jet in service. On 14 April 2016, the Pokémon theming of JA754A was removed and repainted into the standard ANA livery, leaving none with the former theme in operation from 2016 to late 2020.

On 19 December 2020, Solaseed Air inaugurated a Boeing 737-800 (JA812X) with an Exeggutor livery, making it the first Pokémon-themed plane to feature a single species of Pokémon, rather than an ensemble. Solaseed Air is headquartered at the Miyazaki Airport in the city of Miyazaki, Miyazaki Prefecture, Japan; which made Exeggutor its official "Support Pokémon" in October 2020.

On 21 June 2021, Skymark Airlines inaugurated a Boeing 737-800 (JA73AB) with a Pikachu livery, titled “Pokémon Air Adventures.” Skymark Airlines wants to use Pikachu to help promote tourism in the Okinawa Prefecture. When passengers come aboard this aircraft, aside from having Pokémon-themed seats and cabin crew, they are greeted by the Pokémon Center theme from Pokémon Sword and Shield. There are also Pokémon-themed cups (and amenities) and special limited edition KitKats as part of the in-flight refreshment service, and even the self check-in kiosks for the Pikachu route are decked out in Pikachu colours. For a limited time, Japanese Pokémon Go players could find a special Pikachu wearing a Kariyushi shirt at airports on the route the aircraft serves.

On 19 November 2021, Air Do inaugurated a Boeing 767-300 (JA607A) with a Vulpix livery called "Rokon Jet." The airline is planning to use the special livery for 5 years and began services with it in December 2021. The design consists of both forms of Vulpix on both sides: on the port side is the Alolan Vulpix, while the starboard side features the Kanto Vulpix.

On 30 May 2022, Skymark Airlines introduced a second Pokémon Jet onboard another Boeing 737-800 (JA73NG) called "Pikachu Jet BC2." It will operate on routes between Okinawa, Naha, and Simojishima, and will stay in service with this special livery for five years.

On 17 July 2022, Scoot introduced a Boeing 787-9 (9V-OJJ) painted in a Pokémon livery, becoming the first non-Japanese airline to introduce a Pokémon Jet.

On 30 September 2022, China Airlines introduced an Airbus A321neo (B-18101) painted with a special Pokémon livery called "Pikachu Jet CI", becoming the second non-Japanese airline to introduce a Pokémon Jet as well as the first Airbus jet to feature such. It will operate flights to various Japanese cities from its base at Taiwan.

On 28 December 2022, T'way Air introduced a Boeing 737-800 (HL8306) with a Pokémon livery called "Pikachu Jet TW", thus becoming the third non-Japanese airline to introduce a Pokémon Jet. The aircraft will operate flights to Japan and Taiwan from its base at South Korea.

On 26 March 2023, All Nippon Airways introduced a Boeing 787-9 (JA894A) with a painted Pokémon livery called "Pikachu Jet NH". It is their first Pokémon livery since 2016. It will operate on various international routes from its base at Tokyo's Haneda Airport and will stay in service with this special livery for five years.

On 18 January 2023, Solaseed Air inaugurated a Boeing 737-800 (JA803X) with a painted Pokémon livery called "Nassy Jet Miyazaki", featuring Exeggutor and a tropical nature design.

On 25 June 2023, All Nippon Airways introduced a Boeing 777-300ER (JA784A) with a painted Pokémon livery called "Eevee Jet NH." It will operate on USA and London long haul flight routes from its base at Haneda Airport.

On 22 February 2024, Garuda Indonesia introduced a Boeing 737-800 (PK-GMU) with water-themed Pokémon characters on the aircraft, becoming the fourth non-Japanese airline to introduce a Pokémon-themed aircraft livery.

On 1 April 2025, Garuda Indonesia introduced an Airbus A330-343 (PK-GPY) with Pikachu wearing batik on the aircraft, making the first Airbus widebody aircraft to feature with the theme.

On 26 February 2026, All Nippon Airways introduced a Pokémon series 30th Anniversary livery called "Pokémon Jet Red/Green/Blue", featuring a Boeing 787-8 with "Red" livery and a Boeing 737-800 with "Blue" livery operating on domestic routes, and a Boeing 787-9 with "Green" livery operating on various international routes.

On 1 April 2026, China Airlines introduced an Airbus A350-900 (B-18916) with a painted Pokémon livery called "Pikachu Jet CI-2", thus becoming the second widebody Airbus aircraft to feature a Pokémon-themed Livery.

== Passenger experience and response ==
Passengers on the Pokémon Jets receive a complete Pokémon experience. The aircraft and flight crews are decked out in Pokémon themes, including headrests, flight attendant uniforms, food containers, inflight entertainment, and souvenir bags. All Nippon Airways reported an increase in the number of passengers carried as a result of operating the Pokémon Jets.

== List of Pokémon Jets ==
=== All ===
Photo	Airline	Aircraft	Registration	Year unveiled	Year livery removed	Year jet retired (from the airline)	Port from nose to tail	Starboard from nose to tail
	All Nippon Airways	Boeing 747-481D	JA8965	June 1998	c. 2001	June 2013	Clefairy, Pikachu, Togepi, Mew, Mewtwo, Snorlax	Jigglypuff, Pikachu, Psyduck, Squirtle, Bulbasaur
	All Nippon Airways	Boeing 767-381	JA8569	June 1998	February 2000	December 2018	Clefairy, Pikachu, Togepi, Mew, Mewtwo, Snorlax	Jigglypuff, Pikachu, Psyduck, Squirtle, Bulbasaur
	All Nippon Airways	Boeing 767-381	JA8578	July 1998	March 2000	August 2017	Clefairy, Pikachu, Togepi, Mew, Mewtwo, Snorlax	Jigglypuff, Pikachu, Psyduck, Squirtle, Bulbasaur
	All Nippon Airways	Boeing 747-481	JA8962	March 1999	May 2006	December 2010^{a}	Clefairy, Pikachu, Togepi, Mew, Mewtwo, Snorlax	Jigglypuff, Pikachu, Psyduck, Squirtle, Bulbasaur
	All Nippon Airways	Boeing 747-481D	JA8964	June 1999	February 2006	October 2011	Pikachu, Marill, Dratini, Lapras, Slowpoke, Horsea	Togepi, Pikachu, Jigglypuff, Ledyba, Elekid, Meowth
	All Nippon Airways	Boeing 767-381	JA8288	June 1999	February 2006	September 2014	Pikachu, Marill, Dratini, Lapras, Slowpoke, Horsea	Togepi, Pikachu, Jigglypuff, Ledyba, Elekid, Meowth
	All Nippon Airways	Boeing 767-381	JA8357	June 1999	February 2001	February 2016	Pikachu, Marill, Dratini, Lapras, Slowpoke, Horsea	Togepi, Pikachu, Jigglypuff, Ledyba, Elekid, Meowth
	All Nippon Airways	Boeing 747-481D	JA8957	May 2004	October 2013	November 2013	Celebi, Plusle, Minun, Deoxys, Torchic, Munchlax, Jirachi, Latios, Latias	Mew, Pichu brothers, Treecko, Mudkip, Meowth, Lugia, Entei
	All Nippon Airways	Boeing 747-481D	JA8956	November 2004	October 2013	November 2013	Pikachu, Pichu brothers, Mew, Wynaut, Azurill, Castform, Bellossom	Pikachu, Minun, Plusle, Skiploom, Oddish, Igglybuff, Trapinch, Skiploom, Munchlax, Roselia
	All Nippon Airways	Boeing 777-381	JA754A	July 2011	May 2016	November 2025	Oshawott, Pikachu, Victini, Zekrom, Darumaka, Pansage, Scraggy	Tepig, Pikachu, Snivy, Reshiram, Meowth, Axew, Munna
	Solaseed Air	Boeing 737-86N	JA812X	December 2020	September 2022	N/A	Alolan Exeggutor (×4)	Exeggutor (×3)
	Skymark Airlines	Boeing 737-86N	JA73AB	June 2021	N/A (expected 2026)	N/A	Pikachu (×5)	Pikachu (×5)
	Air Do	Boeing 767-381ER	JA607A	December 2021	N/A (expected Summer 2026)	N/A	Alolan Vulpix (×4)	Vulpix (×4)
	Skymark Airlines	Boeing 737-86N	JA73NG	May 2022	N/A (expected Summer 2027)	N/A	Sky Form Shaymin, Wailord, Pikachu, Magikarp	Pikachu, Wailord, Sky Form Shaymin, Corsola
	Scoot	Boeing 787-9	9V-OJJ	July 2022	N/A (expected 2027)	N/A	Pichu, Pikachu, Sky Form Shaymin, Psyduck, Celebi, Lapras	Pikachu, Celebi, Pichu, Psyduck, Meganium, Lapras
	China Airlines	Airbus A321-271NX	B-18101	September 2022	N/A (expected 2027)	N/A	Pikachu, Jigglypuff, Snorlax, Munna, Slowpoke, Swablu	Pikachu, Togekiss, Snorlax, Teddiursa, Sky Form Shaymin
	T'way Air	Boeing 737-8AS	HL8306	December 2022	December 2025	N/A	Pikachu, Sky Form Shaymin, Squirtle, Eevee, Aria Forme Meloetta, Bulbasaur	Pikachu, Charmander, Arcanine, Pirouette Forme Meloetta, Jigglypuff
	Solaseed Air	Boeing 737-86N	JA803X	March 2023	N/A (expected 2026)	N/A	Alolan Exeggutor (×3), Wingull, Exeggutor (×4), Alolan Raichu, Exeggcute	Alolan Raichu, Alolan Exeggutor (×4), Exeggutor (×4), Bellossom, Mantine
	All Nippon Airways (Air Japan)	Boeing 787-9	JA894A	June 2023	N/A (expected 2028)	N/A	Vivillon (×4), Rayquaza, Celebi, Emolga, Rowlet, Charizard	Vivillon (×4), Togekiss, Pikachu, Rayquaza, Latios, Latias, Corviknight
	All Nippon Airways	Boeing 777-381ER	JA784A	September 2023	N/A (expected 2028)	N/A	Eevee, Jolteon, Flareon, Vaporeon, Espeon, Umbreon	Pikachu, Eevee, Sylveon, Leafeon, Glaceon
	Garuda Indonesia	Boeing 737-8U3	PK-GMU	February 2024	N/A (expected 2029)	N/A	Finneon, Squirtle, Horsea, Mantine, Butterfree, Pikachu	Aipom, Vileplume, Oddish, Eevee, Pikachu, Bounsweet
	Garuda Indonesia	Airbus A330-343	PK-GPY	April 2025	N/A (expected 2030)	N/A	Pikachu (×3)	Pikachu (×2)
	China Airlines	Airbus A350-941	B-18916	April 2026	N/A (expected 2031)	N/A	Hoppip, Pikachu, Jumpluff, Beautifly, Vivillon, Dragonite, Dratini	Altaria, Pikachu, Dragonair, Skiploom, Cresselia, Clefairy
	All Nippon Airways	Boeing 787-8	JA819A	July 2026	N/A (expected 2031)	N/A	Charmander, Fuecoco, Fennekin, Torchic, Pikachu, Pombon	Pikachu, Tepig, Chimchar, Cyndaquil, Scorbunny, Litten
	All Nippon Airways (Air Japan)	Boeing 787-9	JA923A	September 2026	N/A (expected 2031)	N/A	Bulbasaur, Sprigatito, Chespin, Snivy, Pikachu, Browt	Pikachu, Chikorita, Grookey, Rowlet, Treecko, Turtwig
	All Nippon Airways (ANA Wings)	Boeing 737-881	JA56AN	December 2026	N/A (expected 2031)	N/A	Squirtle, Quaxly, Piplup, Mudkip, Pikachu, Gecqua	Pikachu, Totodile, Froakie, Oshawott, Popplio, Sobble

^{a} Individual plane would later be written off as Emirates SkyCargo Flight 9788.

=== Airline wise summary ===
Airline	Current	Former	Total
(Japan) Air Do	1	—	1
(Japan) All Nippon Airways	4	10	12
(Taiwan) China Airlines	2	—	2
Garuda Indonesia	2	—	2
(Singapore) Scoot	1	—	1
(Japan) Skymark Airlines	2	—	2
(Japan) Solaseed Air	1	1	2
(South Korea) T'way Air	-	1	1
Total	11	12	23
