= BookSwim =

American online book rental service

BookSwim Corporation
- Company type: Private
- Industry: Electronic Commerce
- Founded: 2007
- Defunct: 2010
- Fate: Acquired by BookLender
- Headquarters: Newark, New Jersey
- Key people: Jeevan Padiyar, CEO; George Burke, Co-Founder/CMO; Nick Ruffilo; CTO/CIO; Georg Richter, Chairman; Shamoon Siddiqui, Co-founder
- Products: Book rental service

BookSwim was a private American online book rental service, offering rental-by-mail of both hardcover and paperback books. The company was launched in 2007.

== History ==
George Burke co-founded BookSwim with friend Shamoon Siddiqui in April 2007, in Shamoon's basement for the first ten months of the company's existence. The company branched out, briefly moving to Aberdeen, NJ before establishing headquarters in Newark, NJ with distribution facilities in eastern Pennsylvania.

== Rental service ==
BookSwim provided unlimited rental-by-mail of hardcover and paperback books on a monthly subscription basis. Subscribers add books to their online reading list, called a Rental Pool. When the subscriber returned finished books, the next books in the Rental Pool would ship out. The similarity to Netflix's business model led to the website informally being called the 'Netflix for books.' BookSwim's plans began at $9.99 per month and included only hardcover and paperback books.

== Recognition ==
BookSwim entered and won Rutgers University’s Business Plan Competition in 2008 and an accompanying cash prize of $20,000. The company was named a 'Startup to Watch' by Entrepreneur Magazine, and the New Jersey Technology Council.

== Market conditions ==
BookSwim's subscribers tended to be high-income avid readers who read over forty books a year; roughly 80% of them were female. As "the core of [the] business is in bestsellers," BookSwim cited its rental of hardcovers as its main competitive edge over competitor Booksfree.

=== Relationships with libraries ===
Though libraries’ reactions to BookSwim included anxiety and resentment, BookSwim claimed to not see itself as competition with libraries. The company expressed interest in taking libraries on as customers and its co-founders appeared at the 2008 Colorado Interlibrary Loan Conference to speak about potential partnerships with them. In October 2008, BookSwim donated an extra 13,000 books from its inventory to the Newark Public Library near its new offices.

== See also ==
- Book rental service
