= Elfriede Cohnen =

German lawyer (1901–1979)

Elfriede Cohnen (1901 - 1979) was a German lawyer and medical doctor. Like many intellectuals, she supported the political aid organization Rote Hilfe Deutschlands, which had set itself the task of providing legal assistance to needy prosecutors without regard to the person.

== Works ==
- Ein Leben wie andere. Ein autobiographischer Roman (A Life Like Any Other. An Autobiographical Novel). Verlag Salzer, Heilbronn, 1979. ISBN 3-7936-0211-7
- Über die Organisation der Inanspruchnahme der Sozialversicherung (On the Organization of the Use of Social Insurance). ZB MED – Informationszentrum Lebenswissenschaften, 1941.
