= Book rental service =

Temporarily lending books to readers

Libraries have been lending books to the public for thousands of years. First libraries date back to 2600 BC during Sumerian civilization. In the modern era, most book loans are done by public libraries, which are operated by governments (mostly local governments). They offer book lending services free to their patrons and are generally funded through taxes and donations or by the state. Public libraries are accessible to the general public and are run by civil servants, state employees, or volunteers. Some of the largest libraries in the world include the Library of Congress in the United States of America and the British Library with millions of titles in their catalogs. Besides the public libraries, private libraries also provide lending services, and are usually run by individuals, associations, or by corporate organizations and universities. Private libraries usually require a subscription or membership to the library (paid or unpaid) and provide services specific to the organization, area or university.

== Book rentals ==
Before the Industrial Revolution, books were too expensive for commoners to buy and some businesses made profit by renting out books for a fee such as the kashi-hon libraries of Japan. In developing and developed nations, for-profit book rental services have started to lend physical books, audiobook CDs, e-books, and audiobook MP3s through stores and online after the popularization of the World Wide Web. Most book rental companies provide books with doorstep delivery using logistic services. Following the popular Netflix model for video rental, many book companies have applied features such as unlimited rentals, free shipping, and no late fees to their book distribution services.

== Book rental models ==
=== Based on rental method ===
Based on the rental method the book rental companies can be categorized into two subgroups:

1. Book rental companies having a subscription-based models where a monthly or periodic subscription fee is charged and members can rent a number of books based on the subscription.
2. Book rental companies taking a fraction of book cost as rent. This is the most prevalent model in textbook and college book renting.

=== Based on type of book rented ===
Based on the type of books that the book rental service rents following classification can be done:

1. Physical or Printed Books. The category can further be subdivided into
  1. Companies focusing on fiction, non-fiction, and other non-academic books.
  2. Companies who primarily rent academic, reference, and educational publications.
2. E-book renters

Many companies renting physical books also rent e-books. Since e-book rental distribution rights are totally different from physical books many smaller companies are not able to rent e-books from standard publishers like McGraw-Hill, Pearson, Prentice Hall, Cengage, etc due to the high licensing fees required for rental rights.

== See also ==
- 3M Cloud Library
- Booksfree
- BookSwim
- Online book rental
- OverDrive, Inc.
- Simply Audiobooks
