= Maria Rentmeister =

German political activist, Women's and cultural policy maker

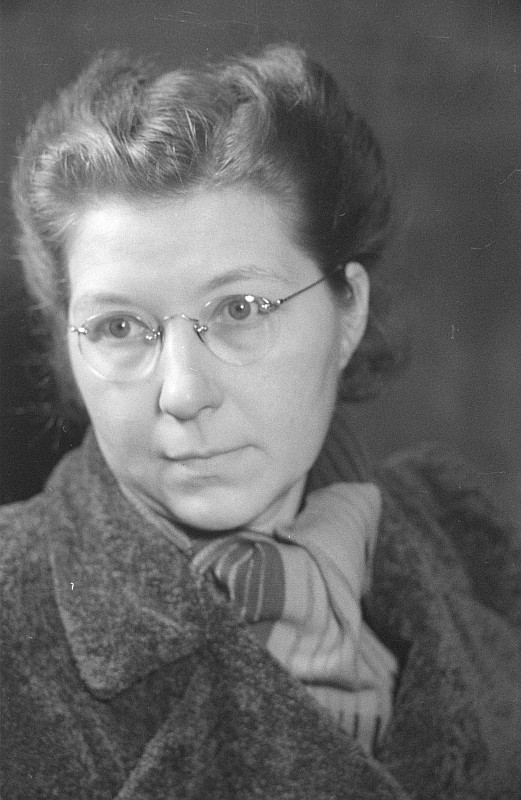
- Rentmeister in 1946
- Born: 27 January 1905; Sterkrade (Oberhausen), Rhine Province (Prussia), Germany
- Died: 10 May 1996 (aged 91); Berlin, Germany
- Occupations: Party activist Politician; Senior Party official General Secretary of the DFD
- Political party: KPD / SED / PDS
- Spouse(s): 1. Wilhelm Bettinger; 2. Fritz Rettmann (1902-1981)
- Partner: Wilhelm Beuttel (1900-1944)
- Parent(s): Franz Rentmeister; Katharina Rentmeister ("Die rote Käthe")

Maria Rentmeister (27 January 1905 – 10 May 1996) was a German Women's and cultural policy maker - who became an anti-government resistance activist after 1933. She spent much of the time during the twelve Nazi years abroad or, later, in state detention. In 1945 she relocated to what now became the Soviet occupation zone (after October 1949 East Germany) where she became the first General Secretary of the politically important Democratic Women's League ("Demokratischer Frauenbund Deutschlands" / DFD).

Since the 2020s, Rentmeister's life, work and achievements have been researched in more depth in contemporary German historiography of the post-war period and highlighted in a number of publications. For this purpose, her extensive legacy in the German Federal Archives in Berlin was also used, as well as radio and film documents.

== Life ==
=== Provenance and early years ===
Rentmeister was born in Sterkrade (Oberhausen) in Germany's heavily industrialised Ruhr/Rhine region, the eldest of her parents' six children. Her father was master tailor, independent entrepreneur, Chairman of the Tailors' Guild and Conservative city councillor in Sterkrade. In political terms it was Katharina Rentmeister (1881-1952), the mother of the six Rentmeister children, who was probably the more important influence. She is also identified in sources by her soubriquet, "die rote Käthe" ("Red Kathy"). Right from the outbreak of the First World War she opposed it, a political standpoint which the political left in Germany shared with increasing passion as the war inflicted ever more carnage on the fighting men and ever greater destitution on those they had left at home.

Nor did Red Kate miss an opportunity to share her political passions with her husband simply because he was away at the front. She used to send him stock market reports and financial statements in respect of the large industrial firms in the Ruhr regions. "That way you know what it is you are really fighting for: the 'Fatherland' is Krupp [a famously profitable armaments conglomerate]" ("Damit du weißt wofür du fällst ... das Vaterland ist die Firma Krupp""). Käthe Rentmeister was a member of the Social Democratic Party while her children were small, but in 1929 she would join the Communists.

Käthe Rentmeister's six children could not avoid the effects growing up in an atmosphere of heightened political awareness. Maria's younger brother Hans also left a significant footprint on history as an anti-Nazi activist.

=== Politics ===
After successful conclusion of her school career, Rentmeister underwent a commercial training. She joined the Young Socialists ("Sozialistische Arbeiter-Jugend"/ SAJ) in 1927. In 1929 she emigrated to the United States where, according to at least one widely requoted source, she remained for three years and worked as a "labourer" (als "Arbeiterin"). Elsewhere there are indications that her employment as a young woman may have been more clerical or secretarial than manual. Sources differ as to whether it was in 1930 or 1932 that Maria Rentmeister joined the Communist Party, but she was clearly a member before 1933. By the end of 1932 was heading up the women's section in the party's district leadership team ("Unterbezirksleitung") for Oberhausen, and was also a Communist town councillor.

=== Nazi years ===
The Nazis took power in January 1933 and lost no time in transforming the country into a one-party dictatorship. That made political activism on behalf of non-Nazi political parties illegal, and after the Reichstag fire it became obvious that political activism on behalf of the Communist Party was viewed with particularly savage disfavour by government agencies. Maria Rentmeister pursued her now illegal political activism for the Communist Party, but she did so in the Saarland (region) which for reasons of history and politics would not come under full German control till early 1935. In the Saarland she established a reputation with party comrades as a trainer and administrator. By 1935 the leadership of the German Communist Party had been arrested (or worse), or else had fled abroad. Two cities, in particular, were rapidly becoming the de facto head quarter locations for the German Communist Party in exile: Paris and Moscow. It was to Paris that Rentmeister fled during the Autumn/Fall of 1934. There she worked during 1934/35 for the ambitiously named "World Committee against War and Fascism" ("Weltkomitee gegen Krieg und Faschismus"). This also involved taking over administrative responsibility for the World Committee's newspaper, "Weltfront" which was produced under the editorship of Albert Norden who many years later would become an influential senior journalist in the German Democratic Republic (East Germany). More immediately, it was through Norden that Rentmeister become involved with the party's "Weltfrauenkomitee" ("World Women's Committee"), for which she also worked.

=== Wilhelm Beuttel ===
One senior activist comrade who escaped to Paris during the Autumn/Fall of 1935 was Wilhelm Beuttel, who took on a position of responsibility for political "education" within the exiled party leadership. Rentmeister and Beuttel teamed up and became partners. One source indicates that the two political exiles married at some stage, but most infer, that Beuttel and Rentmeister still had not taken this step when, in July 1944, Beuttel was executed at Cologne.

=== Party work from outside Germany ===
In 1936 Rentmeister transferred from Paris to the Netherlands where the focus of her party work was on political "education". At the same time she worked with others for the German Communist Party leadership's "western division" ("KPD-Abschnittsleitung West") on the "Westdeutsche Kampfblätter" (resistance newspaper), produced for (illegal) distribution among comrades living "underground" (unregistered at their town halls), across the frontier in Nazi Germany. There are also references to her having been involved in Amsterdam with the "Red Aid" international workers' welfare organisation.

In 1937 the party sent her to Switzerland where she worked for the German Party leadership's "southern division"("KPD-Abschnittsleitung Süd"). Her work, as before, involved political "education". One source also mentions collaboration with exiled German SPD activists, although this would at this time still have run counter to the policy of the powerfully influential Soviet Party Leadership over in Moscow. Wilhelm Beuttel was smuggled from Amsterdam to Zürich at the same time as Rentmeister. At the end of 1937 he was sent back to Amsterdam, however. In or before early 1938 Rentmeister was also sent back to Amsterdam by the party. From Amsterdam Rentmeister now took on responsibility for co-ordinating "Communist women's resistance" ("kommunistischen Frauenwiderstand") in western Germany.

=== Prison ===
The Netherlands had avoided full military involvement in the First World War, and Chancellor Hitler's guarantee of Dutch neutrality in November 1939 encouraged the already widespread belief that in this respect history might be about to repeat itself. However, the German army invaded the Netherlands on 10 May 1940 and very quickly took the country over. Rentmeister was caught and arrested by the Gestapo soon afterwards. In 1941 the regional high court of Hamm convicted her on the usual charge of "preparing to commit high treason" ("Vorbereitung zum Hochverrat"). She was imprisoned till 1945 in the Anrath prison on the edge of Krefeld.

=== After the war ===
War ended, formally, in May 1945 and Rentmeister was released. Her prison and her home region were now under military administration as part of the British occupation zone. Rentmeister, along with most of her relatives, relocated to the large central portion of Germany which was being administered as the Soviet occupation zone, and would be relaunched in October 1949 as the Soviet sponsored German Democratic Republic (East Germany). Communist Party membership was no longer illegal, and she took a lead in re-establishing a party branch in Dessau, where work was starting on rebuilding the destroyed town, between May and July 1945. She was soon able to move to Berlin, less than 100 km to the northeast, where during the Summer of 1945 she worked for the party on culture related matters. From 1945 till its dissolution in November 1947 she also served as chair of the Berlin party Women's Committee. A new political party was formed under contentious circumstances in April 1946 as a result of which Rentmeister was one of many thousand committed communists who signed their party memberships across to the new Socialist Unity Party ("Sozialistische Einheitspartei Deutschlands" / SED), which over the next few years would go on to become the ruling party in a different kind of German one-party dictatorship.

She served between 1946 and 1950 as a member of the Party Executive, generally seen as the precursor to the powerful Party Central Committee which emerged, formally, in July 1950. She also served, between 1946 and 1948, as a member of the Berlin City Parliament ("Berliner Stadtverordnetenversammlung"). Most of the members of the postwar Party Executive went on to become Central Committee members following the launch of the German Democratic Republic, but Rentmeister did not. At a meeting of the Party Executive in Autumn 1948 it fell to Rentmeister to deliver an unwelcome message to party comrades, including the future leadership of the German Democratic Republic. Among the workers in the country, a mood of desolation prevailed ("... eine desolate Stimmung unter den Arbeitern" herrschte). More alarmingly still, the workers displayed strongly anti-Soviet attitudes ("... starke antisowjetische Einstellungen"). It was not something that those present were equipped to address effectively, but report of that speech does provide an early glimpse of the slow-burn build-up to the 1953 uprising.

At the Second People's Congress, on 17/18 March 1948, she was elected for membership of the first German People's Council, mandated to draw up a new constitution (based on a document that had already been provided to it). She was also one of those selected, the next year, for membership of the second People's Council which replaced the first in May 1949 and went on to constitute itself, in October 1949, as the East German parliament (Volkskammer). At that point she did not remain as a Volkskammer member. Rentmeister's political career was very far from over, however.

In 1947 Rentmeister was one of the founders of the Democratic Women's League (Demokratischer Frauenbund Deutschlands/ DFD), serving as a member of its national executive. Between 1947 and 1949 she also served as its general secretary. The DFD was one of five mass organisations which, under the centralised Leninist government model being adopted, was designed to broaden the popular legitimacy of the overall political structure. Alongside the officially designated bloc parties, the mass organisations received from the ruling party their own fixed quotas of seats in the [[Volkskammer|national parliament (Volkskammer)]].

In 1949 Rentmeister took charge at the national Department for Cultural Enlightenment at the Ministry for Public Education. Here, till 1954, she was in charge of developing East German cultural relations with foreign countries. Between 1951 and 1954 she also took on the deputy chairmanship at the National Commission for Cultural Artifacts. Between 1954 and 1958 Rentmeister was the acting head of the National Arts Department within the Ministry for Culture. Between 1958 and 1960 she headed up the press and publicity activities of Progress Film, the country's monopoly film distributor. In 1960, officially on health grounds, she retired from her professional career.

After 1960 she worked as a volunteer for the Party Central Committee's Institute for Marxism-Leninism. She also involved herself with the Commission for the History of the Local Labour Movement which had been established by the Berlin party leadership team ("SED-Bezirksleitung Berlin").

== Personal ==
Rentmeister was married firstly to the Oberhausen communist Wilhelm Bettinger and secondly to Fritz Rettmann (1902-1981). Both were actively engaged in anti-Nazi resistance after 1933. Both spent time in prison and / or camps because of their resistance activities. Both nevertheless survived Nazi imprisonment. Aside from this, details, including the dates of the marriages, are not disclosed in sources. Rentmeister also had a daughter.
