= Terson =

Terson may refer to:

- Peter Terson (1932–2021), English playwright
- Terson syndrome, eye condition
