= BookLender =

Online book rental company

- Company type: Private
- Industry: Electronic Commerce
- Founded: September 2000
- Founder: W. Douglas Ross & Andrew E. Bilinski
- Headquarters: Sterling, Virginia, United States
- Products: Book rental service
- Services: Online book and audiobook rental service
- Website: booklender.com

BookLender is an online book rental company, the first to offer flat rate rental-by-mail to customers in the United States. Established in 2000 and headquartered in Vienna, Virginia. As of 2007, the company stated it had delivered its millionth book and claimed over 13,000 subscribers.

== History ==
The company was founded in 2000 by Douglas Ross, who had previously run a computer systems company, and Andrew Bilinski, who had worked for the US Air Force, Electronic Data Systems (EDS), and BDM International. Ross originally come up with the idea for Booksfree after selling his company. The company raised US$1 million of start-up funding from friends & associates.

In February 2009, they shipped their 2 millionth book. On November 2, 2016, Booksfree rebranded itself as BookLender.

Subscriptions to the site have grown from 4,000 in 2002 and 5,000 in 2003 to over 13,000 in 2007. A majority of Bookfree's subscribers are women.

== Business model ==
The company has been described as "the books version of Netflix", and therefore has a similar business model to DVD-by-mail companies. It is also possible to rent individual titles without having a membership.
