= Micheal Kott =

American actor (born 1961)

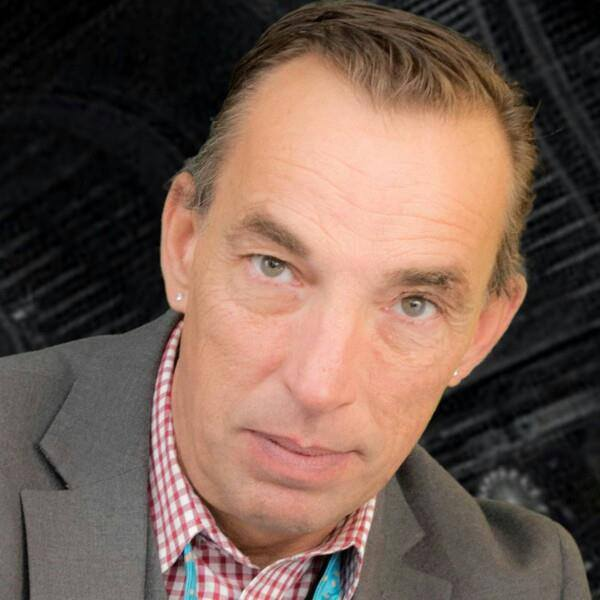
- Micheal A. Kott
- Born: June 17, 1961 (age 65); Riverside, California, U.S.
- Occupation: Actor

Micheal Andrew Kott (born June 17, 1961) is an American actor. He works in theatre, film and achieved recognition for his role in a Chicago production of Blood Brothers, winning a Jeni Award for Best Performance by a Supporting Actor in a Musical in 1997. He was also seen as Morrie in Tuesdays with Morrie. Most recently he received critical acclai for his role as the Psychic in the horror film Secrets of the Clown. Kott was most recently seen as Neville in JPAC's Production of The Secret Garden. He also starred in the Chicago premiere of Rupert Holmes' rarely produced Solitary Confinement. Before The Secret Garden, Kott was last seen as Bernadette in JPAC's production of Priscilla Queen of the Desert.

Currently, Kott is the Associate Dean of the Learning Resource and Performing Arts Center at Morton College, Cicero, Illinois. He served a one-year term on the CARLI Board of Directors. His one-year term ended in June 2019.

His directing credits include Chicago productions of Doubt, Exact Change, The Boys Next Door, Grey Gardens, Das Barbecue, Anthony Shaffer's Murderer and the North American Premiere of Mark Hayhurst's Taken at Midnight.

Kott hosted the Art Kott Polish American Polka Show on WSIV radio in Syracuse, NY from Jan 2019 thru March 2024.
