= Wilhelm Beuttel =

German communist and resistance fighter

Friedrich Wilhelm Beuttel
- Born: 10 August 1900; Karlsruhe, Germany
- Died: 27 July 1944 (aged 43); Cologne, Germany
- Education: International Lenin School, Moscow
- Occupations: Tailor, Politician, Resistance fighter
- Known for: Resistance against Nazism, Leadership in Rote Hilfe
- Office: City Councilor of Friedberg
- Political party: Communist Party of Germany (KPD)
- Movement: Anti-Nazi resistance
- Spouse: Maria Rentmeister

Friedrich Wilhelm Beuttel (10 August 1900 – 27 July 1944) was a German communist and resistance fighter against Nazism.

Beuttel, a tailor, was born into a metal workers' family in Karlsruhe but grew up in Friedberg. He joined the Independent Social Democratic Party of Germany (USPD) in 1917, but left it for the Communist Party of Germany (KPD) together with the left wing of the USPD in 1920. In 1922, Beuttel was elected city councilor of Friedberg for the KPD. From 1929 to 1931, he attended a communist training course at the International Lenin School in Moscow. After returning to Germany, he became organizational head of the Frankfurt am Main branch of the KPD and was elected to the state parliament of Hesse in 1932.

After the Nazi Party came to power in 1933, Beuttel fled to Paris. There, he took over the leadership of the Rote Hilfe, a communist aid organization supporting leftist victims of political repression. He was transferred from Paris to Amsterdam in 1936, and went underground before German troops invaded and occupied the Netherlands in 1940, while his partner, Maria Rentmeister, was arrested by the Gestapo. In the late summer of 1942, Beuttel returned to Germany in order to support the anti-Nazi resistance struggle.

In early February 1943, Beuttel was arrested by the Gestapo. He was sentenced to death by the People's Court and executed in Cologne on 27 July 1944.
