= Max Fürst =

German author (1905–1978)

Max Fürst (June 2, 1905 – June 21, 1978) was a German author. He wrote about his boyhood in Königsberg and his friendship with Hans Litten.

== Publications ==
- Gefilte Fisch. Eine Jugend in Königsberg (1973) and Verlag der Nation, Husum (2002) ISBN 978-3-373-00512-4
- Talisman Scheherezade. Die schwierigen zwanziger Jahre (1976)
  - Gefilte Fisch und wie es weiterging, dtv, Munich (2004) ISBN 3-423-13190-X
- "Hans Litten" in Sozialistische Warte, Vol. 13, 1938, No. 32 v. 12. August 1938, p. 758
- "Mein Judentum" in Mein Judentum. Selbstzeugnisse. Hans Jürgen Schultz (Ed.) Benzinger, Zurich (1999) ISBN 3-545-20153-8
