= Mary O'Malley (playwright) =

English playwright (1941–2020)

- Born: Mary Josephine O'Malley; 19 March 1941; Bushey, Hertfordshire, England
- Died: 19 September 2020 (aged 79); Lambeth, London, England
- Occupation: playwright
- Notable work: Once a Catholic

Mary Josephine O'Malley (19 March 1941 – 19 September 2020) was an English playwright of Irish-Lithuanian descent.

== Early career ==
In the 1960s Mary O'Malley studied drama at the City Literary Institute, and "Improvisation and Playmaking" with Dorothea Alexander. In the mid-1970s, while working in fringe theatre, she joined The Writers' Workshop run by Howard Brenton at the Royal Court Theatre. Early experimental work for theatre in the early 1970s included A 'Nevolent Society, a lunchtime production at the Open Space Theatre, Tottenham Court Road, Superscum and Oh if Ever a Man Suffered, lunchtime productions at the Soho Theatre, the latter play transferring to Hampstead Theatre for a short run as a late night production. Plays for television in the early to mid-1970s included two short plays by writers new to television, Percy and Kenneth and Shall I See You Now for the BBC in Birmingham, produced by Tara Prem.

== Later career ==
In 1975, The Royal Court commissioned O'Malley to write a play, which became Once a Catholic. The play, directed by Mike Ockrent, opened at the Royal Court in 1977 and later transferred to Wyndham's Theatre, where it ran for over two years. In 1977 the play won awards from The Evening Standard and Plays & Players, and in 1978 O'Malley was the first winner of the Susan Smith Blackburn Prize for women playwrights.

Once a Catholic has been performed on tours and at regional theatres in Britain, including the Lyric Theatre, Belfast. In 1979 a production directed by Mike Ockrent was taken on a short tour of theatres in the US before opening at the Helen Hayes Theatre in New York, where it closed after six performances. In 1987 the play was produced in Los Angeles at The Celtic Arts Centre (An Claidheamh Soluis) in North Hollywood, from which the author received the Hollywood Drama-Logue Critics Award for "outstanding achievement in theatre"; it was directed by Joe Praml from which the director received the Hollywood Drama-Logue Critics Award for Direction; Morgan Walsh and David Farjeon received the Award for Acting. There have been productions in Australia, New Zealand, Ireland, Germany, and Belgium, and in 1991 in Opole, Poland, at the Jan Kochanowski Theatre.

In 1977 O'Malley wrote Oy Vay Maria for BBC television, directed by Richard Loncraine. It won a Pye Television Award, was televised in Israel, and produced as a stage play at the Liberal Jewish Synagogue, St John's Wood in 1981 and the Oldham Coliseum Theatre in 1996. In 1978 she wrote Look Out...Here Comes Trouble for the Royal Shakespeare Company at the Donmar Warehouse, directed by John Caird. Set in a psychiatric hospital, it is an ensemble piece for fourteen actors, one of whom was Maxine Audley who received a London Critics Award for her performance as Olive, a clairvoyant.

Other work includes On the Shelf for television (1984) produced by Margaret Matheson, and Talk of the Devil at the Watford Playhouse (1986) directed by Bill Alexander.

== Personal life ==
In 1965, O'Malley married a Jewish man named David Kleinman but the marriage did not last.

From 1976 until 1982, O'Malley's agent was literary agent Michael Imison. In July 1978, the pair were involved in a car crash, hitting a lamp-post. O'Malley, in the passenger seat, received a devastating injury to her right arm, resulting in an ununited fracture that took four years to unite, affecting her writing career for two years. Seven years later, she sued her former agent for damages and was awarded £55,000 in costs.

== Stage plays ==
- 1972 – Superscum, Soho Theatre, London
- 1974 – A 'Nevolent Society, Open Space Theatre, London
- 1975 – Oh If Ever a Man Suffered, Soho Theatre, London
- 1977 – Once a Catholic, Royal Court Theatre, London
- 1978 – Look Out... Here Comes Trouble, Royal Shakespeare Company at the Donmar Warehouse, London
- 1986 – Talk of the Devil, Watford Playhouse, Hertfordshire
- 1996 – Oy Vay Maria, Oldham Coliseum

== Television plays ==
- 12.12.1976 – Percy and Kenneth, BBC Birmingham
- 15.4.1978 – Shall I See You Now?, BBC Birmingham
- 1977 – Oy Vay Maria
- 1984 – On the Shelf

== Awards ==
- 1977 – Evening Standard Award - Most Promising Playwright for Once a Catholic.
- 1977 – Plays & Players Award for Once a Catholic.
- 1977 – Pye Television Award for Oy Vay Maria.
- 1978 – Susan Smith Blackburn Prize winner for Once a Catholic.
- 1986 – Susan Smith Blackburn Prize runner-up for Talk of the Devil.
- 1987 – Hollywood Dramalogue Critics Award for Once a Catholic.
