= Moritz Litten =

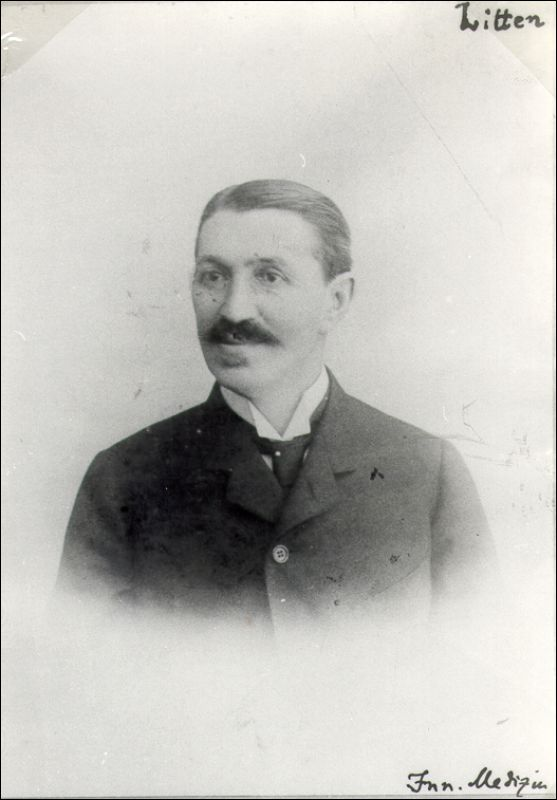
Moritz Litten

Moritz Litten (August 10, 1845 – May 31, 1907) was a German physician who was a native of Berlin. He was a son-in-law to pathologist Ludwig Traube (1818–1876).

== Biography ==
He studied medicine at the Universities of Heidelberg, Marburg and Berlin, earning his medical doctorate in 1868. From 1872 to 1876 he worked at the Allerheiligen Hospital in Breslau, and in the meantime, served as an assistant to Julius Friedrich Cohnheim (1839–1884). From 1876 to 1882 he worked in the clinic of Friedrich Theodor von Frerichs at Berlin-Charité. In 1884 he obtained the title of professor.

Litten is remembered for being the first physician to describe vitreous bleeding in correlation with subarachnoid hemorrhage (SAH). In 1881 he published his findings in Ueber einige vom allgemein-klinischen Standpunkt aus interessante Augenveränderungen (Berl Klin Wochenschr 18: 23– 27). Several years later, French ophthalmologist Albert Terson noticed these symptoms in a patient, and the condition is now known as "Terson's syndrome".

In 1880, Litten documented one of the earliest known cases of a paradoxical embolism in a patient undergoing anaesthesia.

== Associated eponym ==
- Litten's sign: (Roth's spots) in bacterial endocarditis.
