= Simply Audiobooks =

- Launched: 2003
- Platform: [Any]
- Pricing model: Monthly and yearly subscription service
- Availability: Canada, United States
- Website: www.audiobooks.com

Simply Audiobooks is a privately held e-commerce company that offers audiobooks for rental, downloading, and sale. Their primary product line is a subscription-based rent-by-mail model for books on CD, similar to Netflix's DVD-by-mail model. Although a Canadian company, based in Burlington, Ontario, the majority of Simply Audiobooks' customers reside in the United States.

== History ==
- 2003: Simply Audiobooks launched with its core rental service, offering unlimited audiobook rentals in both the United States and Canada with free direct-to-door delivery and no due dates or late fees.
- 2005: Simply Audiobooks launched audiobooks via download, through low-cost monthly subscriptions and a la carte purchases. These downloads are DRM-protected WMA files which can be downloaded to any Windows computer with Windows Media Player 10 or 11 and are compatible with most MP3 players.
- 2006: Simply Audiobooks launched the sale of audiobooks on CD and cassette online. They also purchased North America's largest audiobook store in downtown Toronto, near the company's headquarters in Oakville, Canada.
- 2008: Simply Audiobooks began offering DRM-free MP3 downloads which can be downloaded to any computer (running Linux, Mac OS X, or Windows) and are compatible with any MP3 player (iPod, Zansa, Zen, or Zune) or Smartphone.
- 2013: From July 1–6, in honor of Independence Day, Staples.com offered three downloadable Simply Audiobooks for $0.01 each: Bill of Rights Audiobook - Download, The Constitution & Historical Influences, and Gettysburg Address & Emancipation Audiobook-Download, which do not appear on the company's website and which lack such details as the items' narrators, producers, and release dates.

== Audiobooks.com ==
On January 24, 2012, Simply Audiobooks launched Audiobooks.com, the first cloud-based service for audiobooks, allowing users to access audiobooks on Internet-enabled devices, such as PCs, smart phones, and tablet computers. The application allows users to listen to audiobooks by clicking on a link and streaming their book within the web browser itself, rather than downloading a dedicated application. The audiobooks are stored in cloud storage, which means users can listen to books at any time without downloading files and taking up space on their device.

The service uses proprietary cloudmark synchronization technology that enables users to mark their place in an audiobook on one device and continue listening from the same spot when they switch to a different listening device, without needing a browser plug-in or special application.

As of February 2012, the company's library currently contained more than 11,000 titles from such publishers as Blackstone Audio, HarperCollins, and Simon & Schuster.

Audiobooks.com is compatible with Firefox, Internet Explorer, and Safari. Supported devices include Android devices (Android 2.3 and above), Apple iPads and iPhones (IOS4.0 or higher), and tablet devices using an HTML 5 web application. The company is currently working on apps for BlackBerry OS and Windows Mobile.

The company released native iOS and Android apps in mid-2012.

Audiobooks.com was acquired by RBmedia on April 11, 2017 for an undisclosed amount.

== Office locations ==
Simply Audiobooks' head office is located in Burlington, ON, Canada. They also have two distribution facilities in Buffalo, New York and Las Vegas, Nevada

== See also ==
- Book rental service
