= Terson syndrome =

- Eye anatomy (vitreous humor indicated)
- Specialty: Ophthalmology

Terson syndrome or Terson's syndrome is a rare condition where eye haemorrhages occur due to intracranial bleeding, most often associated with subarachnoid haemorrhage (SAH), commonly from a ruptured cerebral aneurysm. Patients may experience blurred vision, floaters, or complete vision loss due to retinal or vitreous haemorrhage, and neurological symptoms like severe headaches, nausea, seizures, and confusion may also arise. Diagnosis is challenging as the eye bleeding can resemble other conditions, such as diabetic retinopathy or retinal vein occlusion. A fundoscopic exam is the primary diagnostic method, but imaging like CT, MRI, and OCT can aid in confirming the diagnosis. Treatment involves managing intracranial pressure and haemorrhage, with options like vitrectomy or anti-VEGF injections for persistent eye bleeds. The prognosis depends on the severity of both neurological and ocular damage, with early intervention improving recovery chances. However, recurrence risks exist depending on the underlying cause of the haemorrhage. Research continues on improving early diagnosis, surgical approaches, and understanding the genetic and molecular factors influencing the disease.

== Signs and symptoms ==
Temporary Terson's Syndrome symptoms and indicators include abrupt vision loss or blurred vision in one or both eyes, being the most obvious signs of Terson's syndrome. The reason behind this is that blood in the vitreous or retinal layers blocks light from reaching the retina. The extent and location of the intraocular hemorrhage determine the degree of vision impairment. Because of clots or debris in the vitreous cavity, patients may suffer floaters, which are spots or threads in their field of vision. In extreme situations, extensive vitreous bleeding may result in a total loss of the red reflex. Patients frequently exhibit signs of Terson's syndrome because the illness frequently coexists with cerebral hemorrhages such as subarachnoid hemorrhage (SAH). These could include a severe headache (referred to as a "thunderclap headache" in situations of SAH), nausea and vomiting, changed mental status or confusion, and stiff neck (caused by meningism connected to SAH). The symptoms and indicators of Terson's syndrome that persist throughout time are Long-term vision impairments may result if the intraocular hemorrhage is not treated or resorbed naturally. These could include irreversible vision loss, particularly in cases of retinal detachment or macula damage. Retinal fibrosis or tractional retinal detachment can result from persistent, untreated intraocular bleeding. This scarring may necessitate surgery and significantly compromise vision. The fact that Terson's illness mostly affects the brain and eyes highlights the intimate relationship between intracranial pressure and ocular structures. Intraocular bleeding, which can happen in the retina, subhyaloid space (beyond the vitreous membrane), or vitreous body, is the main cause of ocular involvement. If treatment is not received, this bleeding can cause long-term problems such retinal detachment or scarring in addition to impairing eyesight.

== Causes ==
It appears as an aftereffect of an intracranial hemorrhage (such as traumatic brain injury or subarachnoid hemorrhage). Intraocular bleeding results from the condition's abrupt and severe rise in intracranial pressure, which is then conveyed to the eyes through the optic nerve sheath. Terson's syndrome's most frequent cause. A ruptured cerebral aneurysm is usually the cause of SAH, which can result in visual problems and elevated intracranial pressure. An increased risk of Terson's syndrome can result from severe head trauma that causes intracranial bleeding. elevated intracranial pressure brought on by diseases such as brain tumors, arteriovenous malformations, or extreme hypertension.

== Diagnosis ==
Terson's syndrome is frequently diagnosed by combining neurological and ophthalmological testing. Fundoscopy, which enables direct evaluation of the retina for indications of bleeding, usually in the vitreous or retinal areas, is the main diagnostic technique. Further confirmation of intraocular and cerebral hemorrhages can be obtained using further imaging modalities. Ocular ultrasonography can be used to evaluate the anatomy of the eye when the hemorrhage prevents retinal vision. Terson's syndrome is characterized by hemorrhages beneath the internal limiting membrane, which can be detected by optical coherence tomography (OCT).

Despite being uncommon, fluorescein angiography may be useful in assessing retinal blood flow and detecting issues. To verify whether brain hemorrhages are present, neurological imaging is essential. In order to identify subarachnoid hemorrhage and other forms of cerebral bleeding, a CT scan is frequently the initial step. While MRA or CTA (magnetic resonance or computed tomography angiography) can be useful in identifying vascular abnormalities, such as aneurysms, that may have contributed to the hemorrhage, MRI can offer better detailed imaging of mild brain hemorrhages. An important diagnostic criterion is the temporal correlation between the cerebral hemorrhage and the commencement of ocular bleeding; because of increased intracranial pressure, the eye hemorrhage usually happens soon after the brain bleed.

Other diagnostic assessments include visual acuity tests to measure the impact on vision and lumbar puncture to confirm subarachnoid hemorrhage when imaging results are unclear. This comprehensive approach ensures that Terson's syndrome is accurately diagnosed and managed.

=== Differential diagnosis ===
- Diabetic retinopathy: This condition can induce confusion, particularly in diabetic patients, by causing retinal and vitreous hemorrhages that resemble those in Terson's syndrome. Diabetic retinopathy might be the first thing considered in the absence of a complete neurological history.
- Hypertensive retinopathy: Because it also results in retinal hemorrhages, hypertensive retinopathy may be misdiagnosed in individuals with hypertension. This may cause a neurological bleed to go unnoticed, postponing the proper diagnosis.
- Retinal vein occlusion: Especially in older people or those with cardiovascular risk factors, retinal vein occlusion, which is a blockage in the retina's veins, causes retinal hemorrhage and visual loss that resembles the symptoms of Terson's syndrome.
- Primary vitreous hemorrhage: If there is no evident neurological event or other neurological symptoms at presentation, intraocular bleeding may be caused by primary vitreous hemorrhage or other isolated eye disorders.
- Ocular trauma: If a healthcare provider fails to take into account the likelihood that concurrent cerebral bleeding may be contributing to Terson's syndrome, intraocular hemorrhage in a patient with a history of head trauma may be mistakenly diagnosed as a direct eye injury.

== Treatment ==
=== Management of intracranial hemorrhage ===
- Surgical Intervention: Clipping or coiling to prevent re-bleeding and lower intracranial pressure.
- ICP Management: Medications or drainage to reduce pressure.
- Effectiveness: Crucial for preventing further ocular damage and stabilizing neurological function.

=== Observation and monitoring of intraocular hemorrhage ===
- Watchful Waiting: For mild cases, allowing natural blood reabsorption.
- Effectiveness: Effective in mild cases but not suitable for severe hemorrhages.

=== Vitrectomy (surgical removal of vitreous hemorrhage) ===
- Procedure: Removal of vitreous gel and blood to improve vision.
- When Used: Recommended for persistent or dense hemorrhages.
- Effectiveness: Highly effective for vision restoration; carries some risks.

=== Intravitreal anti-VEGF injections ===
- Medication: Off-label use of anti-VEGF injections to reduce inflammation.
- Effectiveness: Mixed results; beneficial for some cases, not standard.

=== Laser photocoagulation (rarely used) ===
- Procedure: Cauterizing blood vessels in cases of recurrent retinal bleeding.
- Effectiveness: Limited in Terson's syndrome; more suited for vascular retinal diseases.

=== Ocular rehabilitation and visual aids ===
- Supportive Measures: Low-vision aids and rehabilitative services for lasting impairment.
- Effectiveness: Improves quality of life for patients with residual vision loss.

== Prognosis ==
=== Vision recovery ===
- Patients with mild hemorrhages often regain full or near-full vision.
- Those with severe hemorrhages who undergo vitrectomy also have a strong chance of visual improvement, though outcomes depend on timely treatment.
- Permanent vision loss can occur if there's retinal damage or complications like retinal detachment.

=== Risk of recurrence ===
The underlying cause of the original episode has a significant impact on the recurrence of intracranial and intraocular hemorrhages in Terson's syndrome. For instance, the chance of rebleeding is greatly decreased in situations with ruptured aneurysms once the aneurysm is treated using techniques like coiling or clipping. Other factors, such poorly controlled hypertension, could raise the chance of more brain hemorrhages in the future, though. Similarly, if intracranial pressure is regulated, intraocular bleeding from a single brain event usually does not repeat. Recurrent intraocular bleeding, however, may result from any further bouts of elevated intracranial pressure, such as those caused by a fresh or recurrent brain hemorrhage. To reduce the chance of recurrence, the underlying ailment must be well managed.

== Epidemiology ==
Terson syndrome is relatively rare, and exact prevalence and incidence rates remain uncertain due to frequent underreporting, especially in patients with severe intracranial injuries. Estimates suggest that 8-15% of patients with subarachnoid hemorrhage (SAH) develop Terson syndrome, though detection methods and study populations can cause this rate to vary. Terson syndrome (TS) is characterized by intraocular hemorrhage following an intracranial bleed, such as SAH. Reported incidence rates for TS following SAH range from 8% to as high as 46%, depending on the study and patient demographics. In one study, up to 21% of SAH patients were found to have TS. However, the true prevalence may be underestimated due to the high mortality rate linked to SAH and other brain hemorrhages, which can limit the number of patients surviving long enough to receive a diagnosis. Although TS is uncommon, it is most often associated with ruptures of the anterior communicating artery (ACommA) aneurysms.

== Research directions ==
=== Improved early diagnosis ===
- Research is increasingly focused on identifying reliable biomarkers or imaging techniques that could lead to earlier detection of intraocular hemorrhage in patients with intracranial hemorrhages. Given that timely diagnosis is crucial for effective intervention and visual outcomes, exploring the role of advanced imaging techniques, such as OCT (Optical Coherence Tomography) and high-definition B-scan ultrasonography, is a promising research avenue.

=== Surgical advances in treatment ===
- The effectiveness of vitrectomy and the timing of the procedure continue to be key areas of study. Several studies suggest that early vitrectomy improves visual outcomes, but there is no universal consensus on the optimal timing for surgery. Research is exploring whether minimally invasive techniques and newer surgical tools can reduce complications and improve outcomes.

=== Long-term prognosis and rehabilitation ===
- Studies focusing on long-term outcomes of TS, including visual rehabilitation and the impact of sustained visual impairment, are essential for improving quality of life for affected individuals. The role of rehabilitation services, including the use of visual aids and therapy for those with permanent vision loss, is another emerging area of research.

=== Predictive models and risk stratification ===
- Developing predictive models that incorporate demographic, clinical, and radiological factors to better stratify risk and guide clinical decision-making is another active area of research. These models could help clinicians anticipate outcomes and personalize treatment plans for patients with TS.

== History ==
An instance of intraretinal hemorrhage coexisting with subarachnoid hemorrhage (SAH) was initially documented by German ophthalmologist Moritz Litten in 1881. In 1900, French ophthalmologist Albert Terson reported a link between SAH—later known as Terson syndrome—and vitreous hemorrhage. This syndrome includes many kinds of intraocular hemorrhages, usually caused by a sudden increase in intracranial pressure (ICP), which can happen in combination with SAH, intracerebral hemorrhage, or traumatic brain injury.

The vitreous, sub-hyaloid, subretinal space, intraretinal regions, or beneath the internal limiting membrane are some of the locations where the hemorrhages may occur in the eye. According to Sohan Hayreh, the rupture of capillaries in the optic nerve, which is most likely brought on by elevated retinal venous pressure from central retinal vein compression, is the source of these retinal hemorrhages. The intricate vascular connections between the brain and the eye are highlighted by the fact that Terson syndrome is most frequently observed after aneurysmal subarachnoid hemorrhages. This emphasizes how crucial it is to diagnose and treat the illness using a thorough, interdisciplinary approach. Terson syndrome occurs in about 13% of SAH patients, especially in more severe instances (shown by a higher Hunt-Hess score), and these cases are linked to a higher risk of death. Persistent vision impairment can cause problems carrying out daily tasks, which might lower one's quality of life or cause psychological suffering like anxiety or depression. In certain instances, vision may return to almost normal levels as the blood in the eye gradually clears itself without the need for major treatment. However, depending on how severe the initial bleeding was, this procedure may take weeks or months.
