= List of All Nippon Airways destinations =

All Nippon Airways flies to a total of 95 airports as of February 2025. This is a list of all of them.

Countries with destinations of All Nippon Airways (as of July 2025, including seasonal and future destinations).

Japan
Countries served
Terminated/Suspended

== List ==
Country/region	City	Airport	Notes	Refs
Australia	Brisbane	Brisbane Airport	Terminated	
Australia	Perth	Perth Airport	Passenger	
Australia	Sydney	Sydney Airport	Passenger	
Austria	Vienna	Vienna International Airport	Passenger	
Belgium	Brussels	Brussels Airport	Passenger	
Cambodia	Phnom Penh	Phnom Penh International Airport	Airport closed	
Canada	Calgary	Calgary International Airport	Terminated	
Canada	Vancouver	Vancouver International Airport	Passenger	
China	Beijing	Beijing Capital International Airport	Passenger	
China	Chengdu	Chengdu Shuangliu International Airport	Suspended	
China	Dalian	Dalian Zhoushuizi International Airport	Passenger + cargo	
China	Guangzhou	Guangzhou Baiyun International Airport	Passenger + cargo	
China	Hangzhou	Hangzhou Xiaoshan International Airport	Passenger	
China	Qingdao	Qingdao Jiaodong International Airport	Passenger + cargo	
China	Qingdao	Qingdao Liuting International Airport	Airport closed	
China	Shanghai	Shanghai Hongqiao International Airport	Passenger	
China	Shanghai	Shanghai Pudong International Airport	Passenger + cargo	
China	Shenyang	Shenyang Taoxian International Airport	Suspended	
China	Shenzhen	Shenzhen Bao'an International Airport	Passenger	
China	Tianjin	Tianjin Binhai International Airport	Terminated	
China	Wuhan	Wuhan Tianhe International Airport	Passenger	
China	Xiamen	Xiamen Gaoqi International Airport	Cargo	
France	Paris	Charles de Gaulle Airport	Passenger	
Germany	Düsseldorf	Düsseldorf Airport	Terminated	
Germany	Frankfurt	Frankfurt Airport	Passenger	
Germany	Munich	Munich Airport	Passenger	
Hong Kong	Hong Kong	Hong Kong International Airport	Passenger + cargo	
Hong Kong	Hong Kong	Kai Tak Airport	Airport closed	
India	Chennai	Chennai International Airport	Terminated	
India	Delhi	Indira Gandhi International Airport	Passenger	
India	Mumbai	Chhatrapati Shivaji Maharaj International Airport	Passenger	
Indonesia	Denpasar	Ngurah Rai International Airport	Terminated	
Indonesia	Jakarta	Soekarno–Hatta International Airport	Passenger	
Italy	Milan	Milan Malpensa Airport	Passenger	
Italy	Rome	Rome Fiumicino Airport	Terminated	
Japan (Chūbu region)	Komatsu	Komatsu Airport	Passenger	
Japan (Chūbu region)	Nagoya	Chubu Centrair International Airport	Passenger	
Japan (Chūbu region)	Nagoya	Nagoya Komaki Airport	Terminated	
Japan (Chūbu region)	Niigata	Niigata Airport	Passenger	
Japan (Chūbu region)	Shizuoka	Shizuoka Airport	Passenger	
Japan (Chūbu region)	Toyama	Toyama Airport	Passenger	
Japan (Chūbu region)	Wajima	Noto Airport	Passenger	
Japan (Chūgoku)	Hiroshima	Hiroshima Airport	Passenger	
Japan (Chūgoku)	Iwakuni	Iwakuni Kintaikyo Airport	Passenger	
Japan (Chūgoku)	Okayama	Okayama Airport	Passenger	
Japan (Chūgoku)	Ōnan	Iwami Airport	Passenger	
Japan (Chūgoku)	Tottori	Tottori Airport	Passenger	
Japan (Chūgoku)	Yamaguchi-Ube	Yamaguchi Ube Airport	Passenger	
Japan (Chūgoku)	Yonago	Miho-Yonago Airport	Passenger	
Japan (Hokkaidō)	Asahikawa	Asahikawa Airport	Passenger	
Japan (Hokkaidō)	Kushiro	Kushiro Airport	Passenger	
Japan (Hokkaidō)	Hakodate	Hakodate Airport	Passenger	
Japan (Hokkaidō)	Monbetsu	Monbetsu Airport	Passenger	
Japan (Hokkaidō)	Nakashibetsu	Nakashibetsu Airport	Passenger	
Japan (Hokkaidō)	Ōzora	Memanbetsu Airport	Passenger	
Japan (Hokkaidō)	Rishiri Island	Rishiri Airport	Passenger	
Japan (Hokkaidō)	Sapporo	New Chitose Airport	Passenger	
Japan (Hokkaidō)	Wakkanai	Wakkanai Airport	Passenger	
Japan (Kansai region)	Kobe	Kobe Airport	Passenger	
Japan (Kansai region)	Osaka	Kansai International Airport	Hub	
Japan (Kansai region)	Osaka	Itami Airport	Hub	
Japan (Kantō region)	Hachijō-jima	Hachijojima Airport	Passenger	
Japan (Kantō region)	Miyakejima	Miyakejima Airport	Terminated	
Japan (Kantō region)	Ōshima	Oshima Airport	Terminated	
Japan (Kantō region)	Tokyo	Haneda Airport	Hub	
Japan (Kantō region)	Tokyo	Narita International Airport	Hub	
Japan (Kyūshū)	Fukuoka	Fukuoka Airport	Passenger	
Japan (Kyūshū)	Ishigaki	New Ishigaki Airport	Passenger	
Japan (Kyūshū)	Kagoshima	Kagoshima Airport	Passenger	
Japan (Kyūshū)	Kumamoto	Kumamoto Airport	Passenger	
Japan (Kyūshū)	Miyakojima	Miyako Airport	Passenger	
Japan (Kyūshū)	Miyazaki	Miyazaki Airport	Passenger	
Japan (Kyūshū)	Nagasaki	Nagasaki Airport	Passenger	
Japan (Kyūshū)	Okinawa	Naha Airport	Passenger	
Japan (Kyūshū)	Ōita	Oita Airport	Passenger	
Japan (Kyūshū)	Saga	Saga Airport	Passenger	
Japan (Kyūshū)	Tsushima Island	Tsushima Airport	Passenger	
Japan (Shikoku)	Kōchi	Kōchi Airport	Passenger	
Japan (Shikoku)	Matsuyama	Matsuyama Airport	Passenger	
Japan (Shikoku)	Takamatsu	Takamatsu Airport	Passenger	
Japan (Shikoku)	Tokushima	Tokushima Airport	Passenger	
Japan (Tōhoku region)	Akita	Akita Airport	Passenger	
Japan (Tōhoku region)	Aomori	Aomori Airport	Passenger	
Japan (Tōhoku region)	Fukushima	Fukushima Airport	Passenger	
Japan (Tōhoku region)	Odate	Odate-Noshiro Airport	Passenger	
Japan (Tōhoku region)	Sendai	Sendai Airport	Passenger	
Japan (Tōhoku region)	Shōnai	Shonai Airport	Passenger	
Malaysia	Kuala Lumpur	Kuala Lumpur International Airport	Passenger	
Mexico	Mexico City	Mexico City International Airport	Passenger	
Myanmar	Naypyidaw	Naypyidaw International Airport	Terminated	
Myanmar	Yangon	Yangon International Airport	Suspended	
Northern Mariana Islands	Saipan	Saipan International Airport	Terminated	
New Zealand	Auckland	Auckland Airport	Terminated	
Philippines	Cebu	Mactan–Cebu International Airport	Terminated	
Philippines	Clark	Clark International Airport	Terminated	
Philippines	Manila	Ninoy Aquino International Airport	Passenger + cargo	
Russia	Moscow	Moscow Domodedovo Airport	Suspended	
Russia	Vladivostok	Vladivostok International Airport	Suspended	
Singapore	Singapore	Changi Airport	Passenger + cargo	
South Korea	Seoul	Gimpo International Airport	Passenger	
South Korea	Seoul	Incheon International Airport	Cargo	
Sweden	Stockholm	Stockholm Arlanda Airport	Passenger	
Taiwan	Taipei	Songshan Airport	Passenger	
Taiwan	Taipei	Taoyuan International Airport	Cargo	
Thailand	Bangkok	Don Mueang International Airport	Terminated	
Thailand	Samut Prakan	Suvarnabhumi Airport	Passenger + cargo	
Turkey	Istanbul	Istanbul Airport	Passenger	
United Kingdom	London	Heathrow Airport	Passenger	
United States	Chicago	O'Hare International Airport	Passenger + cargo	
United States	Honolulu	Daniel K. Inouye International Airport	Passenger	
United States	Houston	George Bush Intercontinental Airport	Passenger	
United States	Los Angeles	Los Angeles International Airport	Passenger + cargo	
United States	Miami	Miami International Airport	Terminated	
United States	New York City	John F. Kennedy International Airport	Passenger	
United States	San Francisco	San Francisco International Airport	Passenger	
United States	San Jose, CA	San Jose International Airport	Suspended	
United States	Seattle	Seattle–Tacoma International Airport	Passenger	
United States	Washington, D.C.	Dulles International Airport	Passenger	
Vietnam	Hanoi	Noi Bai International Airport	Passenger + cargo	
Vietnam	Ho Chi Minh City	Tan Son Nhat International Airport	Passenger + cargo	
