= Hans Litten =

German attorney (1903–1938)

- Hans Litten
- Born: Hans Achim Litten; 19 June 1903; Halle an der Saale, German Empire
- Died: 5 February 1938 (aged 34); Dachau concentration camp
- Occupation: Attorney
- Years active: 1928–1933
- Known for: Subpoenaed Adolf Hitler to appear as a witness in a 1931 trial

Hans Joachim Albert Litten (19 June 1903 – 5 February 1938) was a German attorney who represented opponents of the Nazis at important political trials between 1929 and 1932, defending the rights of workers during the Weimar Republic. During one trial in 1931, Litten subpoenaed Adolf Hitler to appear as a witness, and cross-examined him for three hours. After the Nazis took power in 1933, Litten was arrested when and sent to various concentration camps before committing suicide in Dachau in 1938.

Hitler was so rattled by the trial that, years later, he would not allow Litten's name to be mentioned in his presence. In retaliation, Litten was arrested on the night of the Reichstag fire along with other progressive lawyers and leftists. Litten spent the rest of his life in several concentration camps, enduring torture and many interrogations. After five years and a move to Dachau, where his treatment worsened and he was cut off from all outside communication, he committed suicide.

A number of memorials to him exist in Germany, but Litten was largely ignored for decades because his politics did not fit comfortably in either the West or the Communist postwar propaganda. Not until 2011 was Litten finally portrayed in the mass media, when the BBC broadcast The Man Who Crossed Hitler, a television film set in Berlin in summer 1931.

== Early life and education ==
Litten was born the eldest of three sons in a wealthy family in Halle. His parents were Irmgard (née Wüst) and Friedrich Litten (Fritz). Fritz was born and raised Jewish, but converted to Lutheranism in order to further his career as a law professor. He was a nationalist conservative, and served in the army in World War I, earning the Iron Cross, 1st and 2nd Class. He opposed the postwar Weimar Republic. A distinguished jurist and professor of Roman and civil law, he was dean of Königsberg's law school, later becoming rector of that institution. He was also privy counsel (Geheimer Justizrat) and adviser to the Prussian government. Irmgard was from an established Lutheran family in Swabia, the daughter of Albert Wüst, a professor at the University of Halle-Wittenberg. The family left Halle in 1906 and moved to Königsberg in Prussia.

Litten himself was baptized a Christian; his godfather was Franz von Liszt. Nonetheless, as a youngster he learned Hebrew, choosing it as one of the subjects for his Abitur examinations. From his mother, Litten acquired an interest in humanitarian ideas and art, and gained a strong sense of justice for the threatened, persecuted and disenfranchised. While his father was away at war, Litten once took food from the kitchen to give to a beggar, addressing him as "sir". Litten's relationship with his father was strained, and his initial interest in Judaism was out of rebellion; he felt his father's conversion was opportunistic. Litten became interested in a German-Jewish youth group with socialist-revolutionary ideas, joining with a school friend, Max Fürst. Nonetheless, at times, he considered himself a Christian. In Dachau he was registered as a Jew, and had to wear the yellow star on his clothing.

Litten sought out political debate in his youth. He was shaped by important political and social events of the era, such as World War I, the anti-war demonstration in Berlin on 1 May 1916, when Litten was not quite 13, the German Revolution of 1918–1919, and the arrest and murder of Karl Liebknecht and Rosa Luxemburg by Freikorps soldiers in January 1919. There is an anecdote from Litten's school years, when he was asked in the classroom if they should hang a picture of Paul von Hindenburg, victor of the 1914 Battle of Tannenberg. Litten stated, "I've always been in favour of hanging him."

Litten was pressed into studying law by his father. He was not interested in it, writing in his journal, "When the ox in paradise was bored, he invented jurisprudence." He wanted to study art history, but nonetheless, he approached his law studies in Berlin and Munich with intensity, inspired by the events of the day. The Kapp Putsch, the 1924 court case against Adolf Hitler and other events convinced Litten that Germany was approaching a very dangerous period. His perception that right-wing radicals were receiving more lenient treatment in court than their opponents led to his decision to become a lawyer.

== Legal career ==
Litten passed his examinations in 1927 with excellent grades and was offered a lucrative job in the Reich Ministry of Justice, as well as a good position in a flourishing law firm. He declined both choosing instead to open a law office in 1928 with Ludwig Barbasch, a friend who was close to the Communist Party of Germany (KPD). Politically, Litten was on the left, though independent. He valued his independence and once said, "two people would be one too many for my party." Culturally, Litten was conservative, enjoying classical music and poetry such as that of Rainer Maria Rilke, whose work he could recite. He was an internationalist and was able to read English, Italian, and Sanskrit, as well as enjoying the music of the Middle East. He had a photographic memory and was considered to have a brilliant intellect.

=== Ruhr Uprising and March Action trials (1921) ===
During one of his first trials, Litten caused a sensation, setting the stage for his future as a "labor lawyer". He represented workers who were sentenced in March 1921 to a long term at hard labor in a Zuchthaus for organized resistance against a police raid of a mass uprising in the central German industrial region a year earlier. The police raid was ordered by the Prussian Minister of the Interior, Carl Severing.

Litten was able to get some of the workers recognized as political actors, making them eligible under the amnesty law of August 1920. Through his law partner, Barbasch, Litten got involved with the Rote Hilfe, a solidarity organization founded by Wilhelm Pieck and Clara Zetkin that supported worker's families in dire need during the turbulent early years of the Weimar Republic. In addition, the Rote Hilfe arranged legal support and legal defense for workers who were under indictment for their political activities or views. By mid 1929, the Rote Hilfe had helped nearly 16,000 arrested workers with legal defense and supported the legal rights of another 27,000 cases.

=== May Day Trial (1929) ===
In 1929, Litten defended participants in the 1929 May Day rally in Berlin, known as Blutmai ("Bloody May 1929"). Annual rallies on 1 May had been taking place in Berlin since 1889. In 1929, however, the rally turned bloody when the city banned all demonstrations and the Berlin police intervened with excessive force. Confrontations between demonstrators and police erupted and the police began firing live ammunition into crowds and buildings, killing 33 and injuring hundreds, including many bystanders. The workers were charged with severe breach of the peace and with sedition.

In preparation for a defense, Litten founded a committee with Alfred Döblin, Heinrich Mann and Carl von Ossietzky to investigate the event. Litten himself had been at the demonstration and observed the actions of the police. When he went to one man's aid and began writing down the names of victims and eyewitnesses, he was himself beaten by a policeman, even though he had identified himself as a lawyer. Litten filed an indictment against Berlin Police President, Karl Friedrich Zörgiebel, charging him with 33 counts of incitement to commit murder. In his legal notice, he stated:

Zörgiebel has been a member of the Social Democratic Party for many years. He therefore knows that even in Imperial Germany and czarist Russia, workers have never foregone the right to May Day demonstrations because of a police ban. He also knows that a socialist-educated working class will never let this right be taken away. If the defendant still upheld the ban on demonstrations, he also knew there would still be a demonstration. As a person of normal intelligence, the defendant knew that lifting the ban on demonstration would not have come even close to the terrible effect from violent enforcement of the ban.

Litten's approach was to focus on the legality of the police use of lethal force. Rather than prosecute individual police officers, Litten sought to hold the President responsible and he accused Zörgiebel of ordering the police to use truncheons and live ammunition against the demonstrators. If the police action was illegal under the criminal code, the resulting deaths were murders and anything done by the demonstrators was "self-defense in the full legal sense". He argued that Zörgiebel had ordered the police to use lethal force for political, rather than law enforcement reasons. As proof, he produced a 2 May 1929 article from the Berliner Tageblatt, where Zörgiebel had written a defense of his actions that showed its political basis. According to Prussian law, police could use "necessary measures" to maintain public peace and security or prevent a public danger; in other words, it was to be police work and not the result of political conditions.

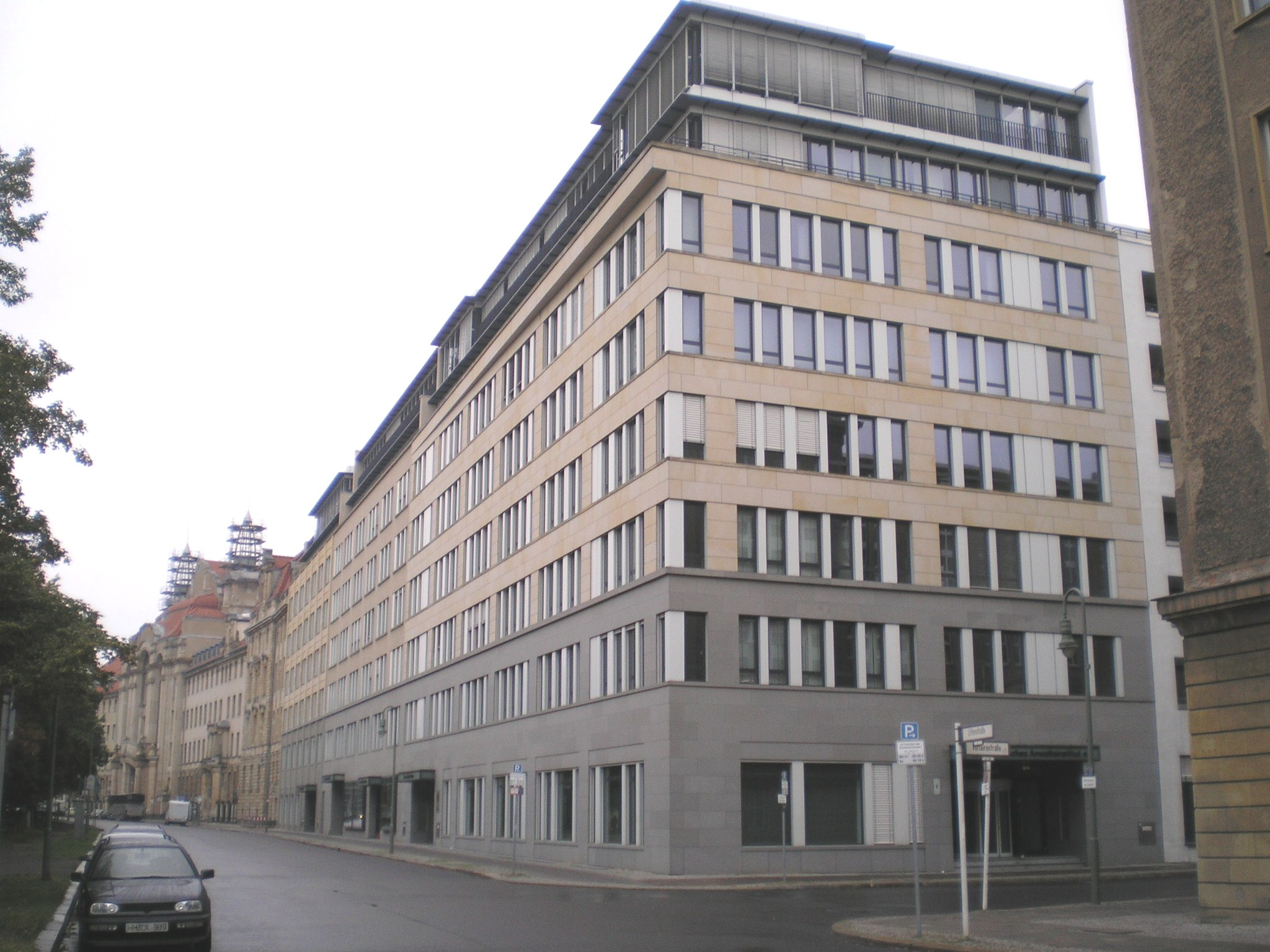
Hans Litten Haus on Littenstraße in Berlin

The indictment of Zörgiebel was rejected by the public prosecutors and Litten appealed to a higher court. Zörgiebel turned around and pressed charges against a Leftist who had slapped his ear. Litten then appeared for this worker's defense, arguing that the worker had acted out of justifiable anger about Zörgiebel's 33 murders. The justice rejected Litten's request to produce evidence on the grounds that the 33-count murder indictment against Zörgiebel could be accepted as fact without dropping the culpability of the worker who had hit Zörgiebel on the ear.

The objective in Litten's many lawsuits for the victims of police violence was not to litigate individual incidents, but rather to warn about the growing repression in Weimar Republic. He also worked to put paramilitary violence on display, in the hopes it would awaken the German people to the threat facing them. He saw the methods of the police as approaching those of civil war and as being illegal and worked to prove that in court and to prosecute the responsible parties, even if they were in the highest political circles. He wasn't interested in creating Left Wing martyrs, rather he sought acquittal or an appropriate sentence, which caused him multiple conflicts with the Rote Hilfe and the KPD.

=== Tanzpalast Eden Trial (1931) ===
On November 22, 1930, an SA Rollkommando attacked a popular dance hall frequented predominantly by left-wing workers. The victims were members of a migrant workers' association that was holding a meeting at the Tanzpalast Eden ("Eden Dance Palace") in Berlin. Three people were killed and 20 injured in an attack that was planned in advance. The subsequent police investigation was plodding and slow. Litten used four of the injured to represent the plaintiff, seeking to prove three cases of attempted manslaughter, breach of the peace and assault. In addition to pursuing criminal convictions of the offenders, Litten wanted to show that the Nazis intentionally used terror as a tactic to destroy the democratic structures of the Weimar Republic. Hitler was summoned to appear as a witness in court to that end. Shortly before, in September 1930, Hitler had appeared in Leipzig as a witness at the "Ulm Reichswehr Trial" against two officers charged with conspiracy to commit treason for having had membership in the Nazi Party, at that time, forbidden to Reichswehr personnel. Hitler had insisted that his party operated legally, that the phrase "National Revolution" was to be interpreted only "politically", and that his Party was a friend, not an enemy of the Reichswehr. Under oath, Hitler had described the SA as an organization of "intellectual enlightenment" and explained his statement that "heads will roll" as a comment about "intellectual revolution". (Note: After the Machtergreifung, however, Hitler elaborated further, saying "there will be a German State Court and the November 1918 [Revolution] will find atonement and heads will roll".)

Litten cross examined Hitler for three hours, exposing many points of contradiction and proving that Hitler had exhorted the SA to embark on a systematic campaign of violence against the Nazis' enemies. That was crucial because, to appeal to middle class voters, Hitler was trying to pose as a conventional politician and maintained that the activities of the Nazi Party were "strictly legal". Though a judge eventually halted Litten's questioning, thereby saving Hitler from further damning exposure, newspapers reported on the trial in detail and Hitler was investigated for perjury that summer. Although he survived that inquiry intact, he was rattled by the experience.

The court called Hitler to appear on the witness stand on 8 May 1931. Litten set out to show that the SA Sturm 33 ("Storm 33") was a rollkommando (a small, mobile paramilitary unit, generally murderous) and that its attack of the Eden and the resulting murders were undertaken with the knowledge of the party leadership. This would mean that the Nazi Party was not, in fact, a legal and democratic organization and would undermine Hitler's efforts to be seen as a serious politician and statesman. Hitler never forgot the Eden trial, and held a personal antipathy towards Litten. Years later, Litten's name still could not be mentioned in Hitler's presence. Roland Freisler quoted Franz Gürtner as saying, "No one will be able to do anything for Litten. Hitler turned red with rage from just hearing Litten's name, once bellowing at Crown Prince Wilhelm of Prussia, 'Anyone who advocates for Litten lands in the concentration camp, even you.'"

==== Excerpts from the trial ====
Litten: (...) Did you know that in the circles of the SA there is talk of a special rollkommando?
Hitler: I haven't heard anything about a rollkommando. (...)
Litten: You said that there will be no violent acts on the part of the National Socialist Party. Didn't Goebbels create the slogan, "one must pound the adversary to a pulp?"
Hitler: This is to be understood as "one must dispatch and destroy opposing organizations". (...)
(The presiding judge read a question formulated by Litten): Did Hitler, as he named Goebbels "Reichsleiter" (Leader for the empire) of Public Enlightenment and Propaganda, know of the passage from his book, where Goebbels declares that fear of the coup d'état cannot be permitted, that parliament should be blown up and the government hunted to hell and where the call to revolution was made again, letter-spaced?
Hitler: I can no longer testify under oath, if I knew Goebbels' book at the time. The theme (...) is absolutely of no account to the Party, as the booklet doesn't bear the Party emblem and is also not officially sanctioned by the Party. (...)
Litten: Must it not be measured against Goebbels' example, to awaken the notion in the Party, that the legality scheme is not far away, if you neither reprimanded nor shut out a man like Goebbels, rather straightaway made him head of Reich Propaganda?
Hitler: The entire Party stands on legal ground and Goebbels (...) likewise. (...) He is in Berlin and can be called here any time.
Litten: Has Herr Goebbels prohibited the further dissemination of his work?
Hitler: I don't know.

[In the afternoon, Litten returned to this subject.]

Litten: Is it correct that Goebbels' revolutionary journal, The Commitment to Illegality [Das Bekenntnis zur Illegalität], has now been taken over by the Party and has reached a circulation of 120,000? (...) I have concluded that the journal is sanctioned by the Party. (...)
Presiding judge: Herr Hitler, in point of fact, you testified this morning, that Goebbels' work is not official Party [material].
Hitler: And it isn't, either. A publication is an official Party [organ] when it bears the emblem of the Party.

Hitler (shouting, red-faced): How dare you say, Herr Attorney, that is an invitation to illegality? That is a statement without proof!
Litten: How is it possible that the Party publishing house takes over a journal that stands in stark contrast to the Party line?
Presiding judge: That doesn't have anything to do with this trial.

Hitler was reported to have been visibly embarrassed by this exchange. In a commentary on the cross-examination, liberal journalist Rudolf Olden summed up Litten's strategy as an attempt to force Hitler to uphold legality and renounce violence, which he hoped would cost him the support of his most revolutionary supporters. According to Olden, as few of Hitler's voters wanted to believe his own claims, Litten intended to send the following message to them: "Don't believe him anymore, he is telling the truth". However, Olden worried that the German people "do not catch on that fast".

=== Felseneck Trial (1932) ===
The Felseneck Trial was Litten's last major fight against the Nazi Party. On trial were five Nazis and 19 residents of the Felseneck arbour colony, where many left-wing workers, including Communists and Social Democrats, were living. In January 1932, there was a brawl involving about 150 storm troopers and colony residents. The troopers surrounded the colony and attacked with stones and firearms. Two people were killed, Ernst Schwartz, a member of the Berlin SA and Fritz Klemke, a Communist; several others, including two police officers, were injured. The resulting trial had numerous defendants and hundreds of witnesses.

Litten's meticulousness began to annoy both the presiding judge and the prosecutors, who began to conspire to get Litten removed from the trial. Although there were no legal grounds, the court expelled Hans Litten both as counsel and ancillary counsel for the plaintiff because he had "unfurled unrestrained partisan propaganda in the trial" and "made the courtroom a hotbed of political passions". This decision was set aside by the court of appeals, whereupon the presiding judge and an official from the criminal division declared the trial to be biased and the trial was unable to proceed.

Shortly after that, Litten was again removed from a high court, having been accused of influencing a witness. This time, the action was sustained by the Kammergericht (Supreme Court) and the court commented further during an investigation of the defense, that the main trial was generally inadmissible. This caused an uproar in the community of Berlin lawyers, including those who were not well-disposed toward Litten. A meeting of Berlin attorneys demanded a change to the law in order to prevent such a curtailment of the fundamental rights of defense attorneys. Litten was excoriated in the Nazi press as the "Red Death Defender" and readers were urged to "Put a stop to his dirty work". It was no longer possible for Litten to go out in public without a bodyguard.

== Imprisonment ==
By 1932, the Nazi Party was in ascendancy. Litten's mother and friends were urging him to leave Germany, but he stayed. He said, "The millions of workers can't leave here, so I must stay too." Hitler's hatred for Litten was not forgotten and in the early hours of 28 February 1933, the night of the Reichstag fire, he was roused from his bed, arrested and taken into protective custody. Litten's colleagues Ludwig Barbasch and Professor Felix Halle were also arrested.

Litten was first sent – without trial – to Spandau Prison. From there, he was moved from camp to camp, despite efforts by his mother to free him, along with jurists and prominent people from in and outside Germany, such as Clifford Allen and the "European Conference for Rights and Freedom", which had members from several countries. Litten was sent to Sonnenburg concentration camp, Brandenburg-Görden Prison, where he was tortured, along with anarchist Erich Mühsam. In February 1934, he was moved to the Moorlager, Esterwegen concentration camp in Emsland and a few months later, he was sent to Lichtenburg.

=== Torturous treatment ===
The treatment Litten suffered was later described to his mother by an eyewitness. Very early on, he was beaten so badly that the Nazis refused to let even his fellow prisoners see him. He was tortured and forced into hard labour. He attempted suicide in 1933 in an attempt to avoid endangering his former clients, but he was revived by the Nazis so that they could interrogate him further. Litten's suicide attempt came at Spandau Prison, after he buckled under torture administered to extract information about the Felsenecke trial (see below). After revealing some information, he was immediately accused in the press as an accomplice to the murder of an SA man. Litten then wrote a letter to the Gestapo, saying that evidence gained in such a manner was not true and that he recanted. Knowing what awaited him, he then attempted to take his life.

Litten's mother wrote about his ordeal, recounting how injuries sustained by him early on left his health permanently damaged. One eye and one leg were injured, never recovering; his jawbone fractured; inner ear damaged; and many teeth knocked out. She also related how, despite her access to many important people in Germany at that time, including Reichswehrminister Werner von Blomberg, Prince Wilhelm of Prussia, Reichsbischof Ludwig Müller, Minister of Justice Franz Gürtner and even then-State Secretary Roland Freisler, she was unable to secure her son's release.

Despite his injuries and suffering, Litten strove to maintain his spirits. At one point in 1934, his situation improved a little bit when he was moved to Lichtenburg. Initially, it was the same, with more beatings, but then he was allowed to work in the book bindery and the library. On occasion, he was able to listen to music on the radio on Sundays. He was well liked and respected by his fellow prisoners for his knowledge, inner strength and courage. One prisoner wrote about a party (allowed by the SS) at which a number of SS men were in attendance. Unafraid of their presence, Litten recited the lyrics of a song that had meant a lot to him in his youth, "Thoughts are free" (in German, Die Gedanken sind frei). The prisoner said that apparently the SS men did not grasp the significance of the words.

=== Death ===
In summer 1937, Litten was sent to Buchenwald concentration camp for a month, before finally being sent to Dachau. He arrived on 16 October 1937 and was put in the Jewish barracks. The Jewish prisoners were isolated from others because Jews in other countries were then spreading the grim news about Dachau. Litten's last letter to his family, written in November 1937, spoke of the situation, adding that the Jewish prisoners were soon to be denied mail privileges until further notice. All letters from Jewish prisoners at Dachau ceased at this time.

In the face of their depressing situation, the Jews at Dachau made efforts to have culture and discussion in their lives, to keep their spirits up. Litten would recite Rilke for hours and he impressed the other prisoners with his knowledge on many subjects. Underneath, however, Litten was losing hope. On 5 February 1938, after five years of interrogation and torture and a failed escape attempt, Litten was found by several friends from his barracks, hanging in the lavatory, a suicide.

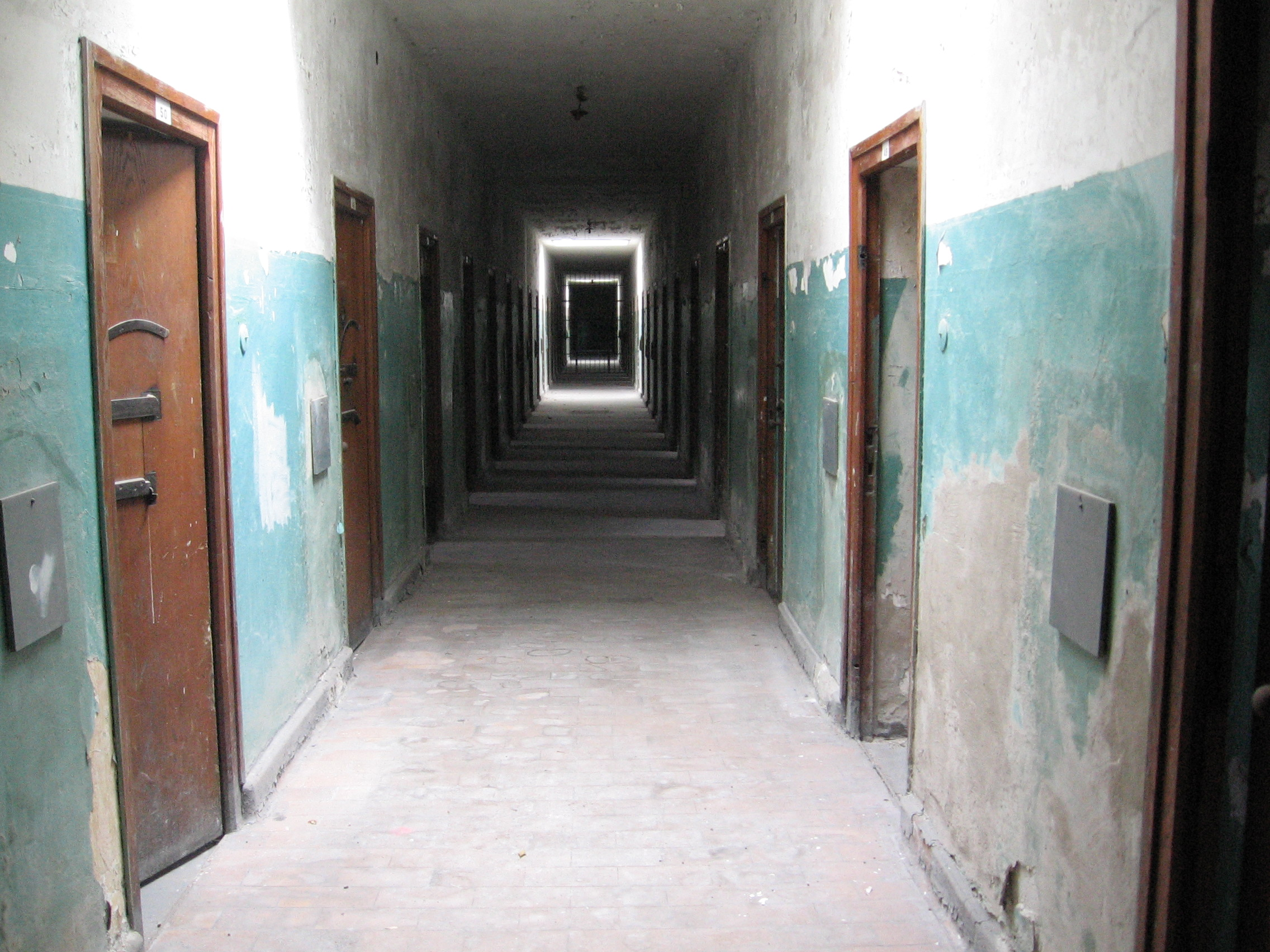
The "bunker", Dachau's prison

The day before his suicide, one of Litten's friends, Alfred Dreifuß, found a noose under Litten's pillow. He showed it to the blockälteste, who said it was not the first that had been found in Litten's possession. At the time, Litten was under interrogation in the "bunker" (see photo). When he came back, he was clearly in a suicidal frame of mind, repeating several times that he "must speak with Heinz Eschen", a prisoner who had just died. He also had recently told his friends that he had enough of being imprisoned. Another of Litten's Dachau friends, Alfred Grünebaum, said later that Litten was in constant fear of more brutal interrogations and that Litten had given up on ever being free. On the evening of 4 February 1938, it was clear what Litten had in mind, but no one kept watch. In the middle of the night, his bed was discovered empty and his friends found him hanging in the lavatory. Litten wrote a few parting words and that he had decided to take his life.

== Legacy ==
Aside from several memorials in Germany, after the war Litten remained unknown for decades because neither Western nor Communist governments found him suitable for their Cold War propaganda. For the West, Litten had been too involved with Communists and for Communists Litten's rejection of Stalinism made him a pariah.

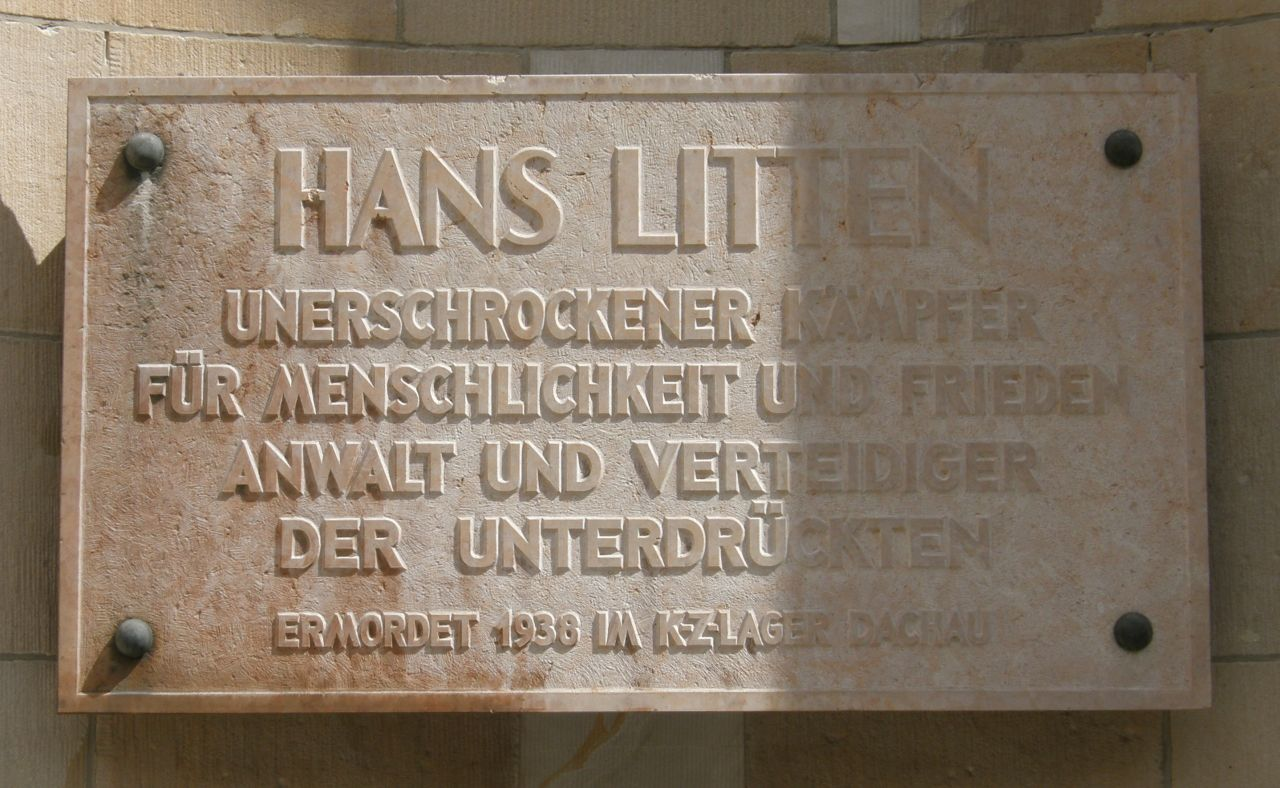
Memorial for Litten in Berlin-Mitte

When East and West Germany were reunited, the lawyers association of Berlin chose to call itself the Hans Litten Bar Association. Every two years, a lawyer is given the Hans Litten Prize by the German and European Democratic Lawyers Association. The Israeli lawyer Leah Tsemel and Michael Ratner, an American lawyer and the president of the Center for Constitutional Rights, have both received the award.

There is a memorial plaque for Litten located on the former Neue Friedrichstraße, renamed in Litten's honor in 1951. The federal and Berlin bar associations (Bundesrechtsanwaltskammer and Rechtsanwaltskammer Berlin) have their headquarters at the Hans Litten Haus, also on Littenstraße. In 2008, the first in-depth biography of Litten in English was written. Author Benjamin Carter Hett, a historian and former lawyer, came across Litten while working on another book. Commenting on the relevance of Litten's life today and the treatment he suffered while imprisoned, Hett said: (Note: In an interview, Hett said he wanted to find out how a country let the rule of law get corrupted. He noted that before the Nazi era, Germany was a law-abiding country with a relatively low crime rate, but that the country was fraught with economic problems and worried governments and there were bitter political divisions. As the crises became more severe, the government changed several times, growing more authoritarian and stripping away the rights of Germans.)

...it is startling to read the words of Werner Best, one of the top officials in Hitler's secret police, the Gestapo, explaining in 1935 why the Nazi regime would not allow concentration camp prisoners like Hans Litten to have lawyers: "The forms of procedure of the justice system are, under present conditions, absolutely inadequate for the struggle against enemies of the state." It is also startling to read that some of the tortures inflicted on Litten and his fellow prisoners – mock shootings, "stress positions" – were the same as those used at Abu Ghraib or Guantanamo.

In 2011, Litten's story was filmed by the BBC. The Man Who Crossed Hitler was written by Mark Hayhurst and directed by Justin Hardy. The role of Hans Litten was played by Ed Stoppard. Hayhurst has also written a play on Litten's life, entitled Taken At Midnight, which premiered at Chichester Festival Theatre in September 2014 and transferred to Theatre Royal, Haymarket, London in January 2015.

== In popular culture ==
Litten has been played by Ed Stoppard in the 2011 TV film The Man Who Crossed Hitler, by Martin Hutson in Taken at Midnight at Chichester Festival Theatre in 2014 and Theatre Royal Haymarket in 2015, and by German actor Trystan Putter in Seasons 3 and 4 of the 2017 TV show Babylon Berlin. Litten's work as a lawyer prior to Hitler becoming Chancellor is featured prominently in Politics, ep. 1 of Season 1 of the 2019 BBC documentary Rise of the Nazis. The book Crossing Hitler: The Man Who Put the Nazis on the Witness Stand (2008) by Benjamin Carter Hett recounts the episode from the trial in which Hans Litten summons Hitler to testify. This is the only time Hitler ever had to testify in court.

== See also ==
- Rollkommando Hamann for a more extensive explanation of a Rollkommando
- Mischling
- List of Germans who resisted Nazism
