= The Man Who Crossed Hitler =

2011 television film

- Written by: Mark Hayhurst
- Directed by: Justin Hardy
- Starring: Ed Stoppard; Ian Hart; Bill Paterson; Sarah Smart; Anton Lesser
- Country of origin: United Kingdom
- Original language: English

Production
- Producers: Susan Horth; Lucy Bassnett-McGuire
- Running time: 85 minutes
- Production companies: Hardy Pictures; Northern Ireland Screen; BBC Northern Ireland

Original release
- Release: 21 August 2011

The Man Who Crossed Hitler is a 2011 BBC film set in Berlin in the summer of 1931, dramatising the true story in which a lawyer, Hans Litten, subpoenaed Adolf Hitler as a witness in the trial of some Nazi thugs. Hitler has formally renounced the use of political violence and the young lawyer sees a chance to expose the Nazi leader's deceptions to the German establishment, thereby discrediting Hitler and the Nazi Party. The film was given an alternative title Hitler on Trial which was used when the Public Broadcasting Service in the United States aired the work.

== Cast ==
The cast included:

- Ed Stoppard as Hans Litten
- Ian Hart as Adolf Hitler
- Bill Paterson as Kurt Ohnesorge
- Sarah Smart as Margot Fürst
- Anton Lesser as Rudolf Olden
- Ronan Vibert as Walther Stennes
- Chris Simpson as Brownshirt
