= Litten's sign =

- Differential diagnosis: Infective endocarditis

Litten's sign is a clinical sign in which cotton wool spots are seen on fundoscopic examination of the retina in patients with infective endocarditis.

The sign is named after Moritz Litten.

== See also ==
- Roth's spot
