= Once a Catholic =

Play

- Written by: Mary O'Malley (playwright)

Premiere
- Date premiered: August 19, 1977
- Place premiered: Royal Court Theatre

Once a Catholic is a play by Mary O'Malley.

Once a Catholic is a comedy first performed at The Royal Court Theatre in London in 1977, directed by Mike Ockrent. It concerns a retrospective view of the values of 1950s Catholic convent schools and the female adolescent response to those values.

The play won awards from the Evening Standard newspaper and Plays & Players magazine. Mary O'Malley went on to be the Royal Court's resident dramatist for 1977. The production transferred to Wyndham's Theatre in the West End where it ran for over two years.

In 2009, it was revived by the LOST Theatre Company, Upstairs at the Gatehouse, London.

== Work ==
- "Once a Catholic: a comedy", Samuel French, Inc., 1978, ISBN 978-0-573-61359-3
