= Rote Hilfe =

Political aid organization

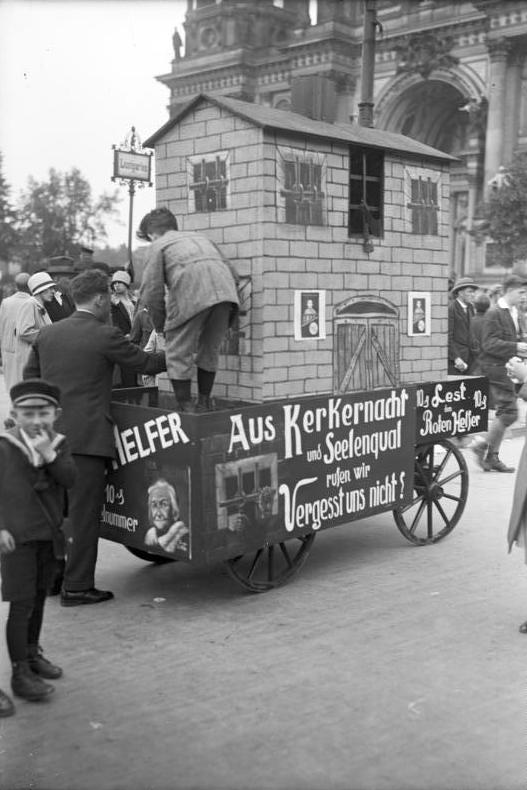
Whitsun gathering of Rotfrontkämpferbund with a wagon promoting the Rote Hilfe, May 1928

The Rote Hilfe ("Red Aid") was the German affiliate of the International Red Aid. The Rote Hilfe was affiliated with the Communist Party of Germany and existed between 1924 and 1936. Its purpose was to provide help to those Communists who had been jailed or were imprisoned.

== Origin ==
The Rote Hilfe was first organized as a result of the political repression in April 1921 following bloody strikes and communist rebellions in central Germany in March of that year. It was formed after a decision the Communist Party of Germany (KPD). In November 1921, a "Berlin Committee" was created as a central committee.

The Fourth World Congress of the Comintern in Moscow from 5 October - 12 November 1922, called for "the creation of organizations to render material and moral aid to all captives of capitalism in prison." This effort later became the International Red Aid, (also known by its Russian abbreviation, MOPR). The Rote Hilfe Deutschlands (RHD) was founded on 1 October 1924 as an organization affiliated with the KPD. Artist Heinrich Vogeler, was one of the founding members and was elected to the Central Committee. The first chairman was Wilhelm Pieck, later the first and only president of the German Democratic Republic. He was previously the leader of the Juristischen Zentralstelle of the Landtag of the Weimar Republic and the Reichstag faction of the KPD. After 1925, Clara Zetkin assumed leadership of the RHD. After the death of Julian Marchlewski that same year, she also led the MOPR.

In the beginning, the organization was active with the campaign, "Rote Hilfe for the victims of war and work", part of an international campaign to support war victims and those disabled at work. The main emphasis of the work was the support of arrested members of the Rotfrontkämpferbund, the Socialist Workers' Party of Germany, Communist Workers' Party of Germany, unionists, as well as unaffiliated individuals and their family members.

The Rote Hilfe proclaimed 18 March 1923 (anniversary of the Paris Commune) to be the "International Day of Aid for Political Prisoners" and observed this day till they were banned by the National Socialists in 1933.

In March 1930, the Rote Hilfe took part in the founding of a German section of the "International Juridical Union", which dealt with penal, popular, constitutional and labor rights.

In 1933, the Rote Hilfe was banned, following the issuing of the Reichstag Fire Decree. Hans Litten, Felix Halle, Alfred Apfel and other lawyers were arrested the very night of the Reichstag fire. The organization tried to continue its work through 1934, directed by exiled leadership in Paris. By 1935–1936, the Rote Hilfe had been dissolved by the Gestapo. Some members continued to work underground to help threatened individuals go into exile through the Saar (protectorate), then still an autonomous region. Wilhelm Beuttel took over the leadership of the organization from exile in Paris in 1933–1934.

== Membership and statistics ==
The chapters of the Rote Hilfe consisted of factory and neighborhood cells and were led by district chairmen who worked under a central chairman. An "auditing commission" was adjunct to the Central Committee and monitored compliance with applicable law. Each chapter had a "relief commission", which was supposed to also involve local politicians. The Rote Hilfe employed 60-80 people full-time. There were annual national congresses, at which lawyers such as Kurt Rosenfeld, Felix Halle and Hilde Benjamin gave lectures on criminal law and other legal issues.

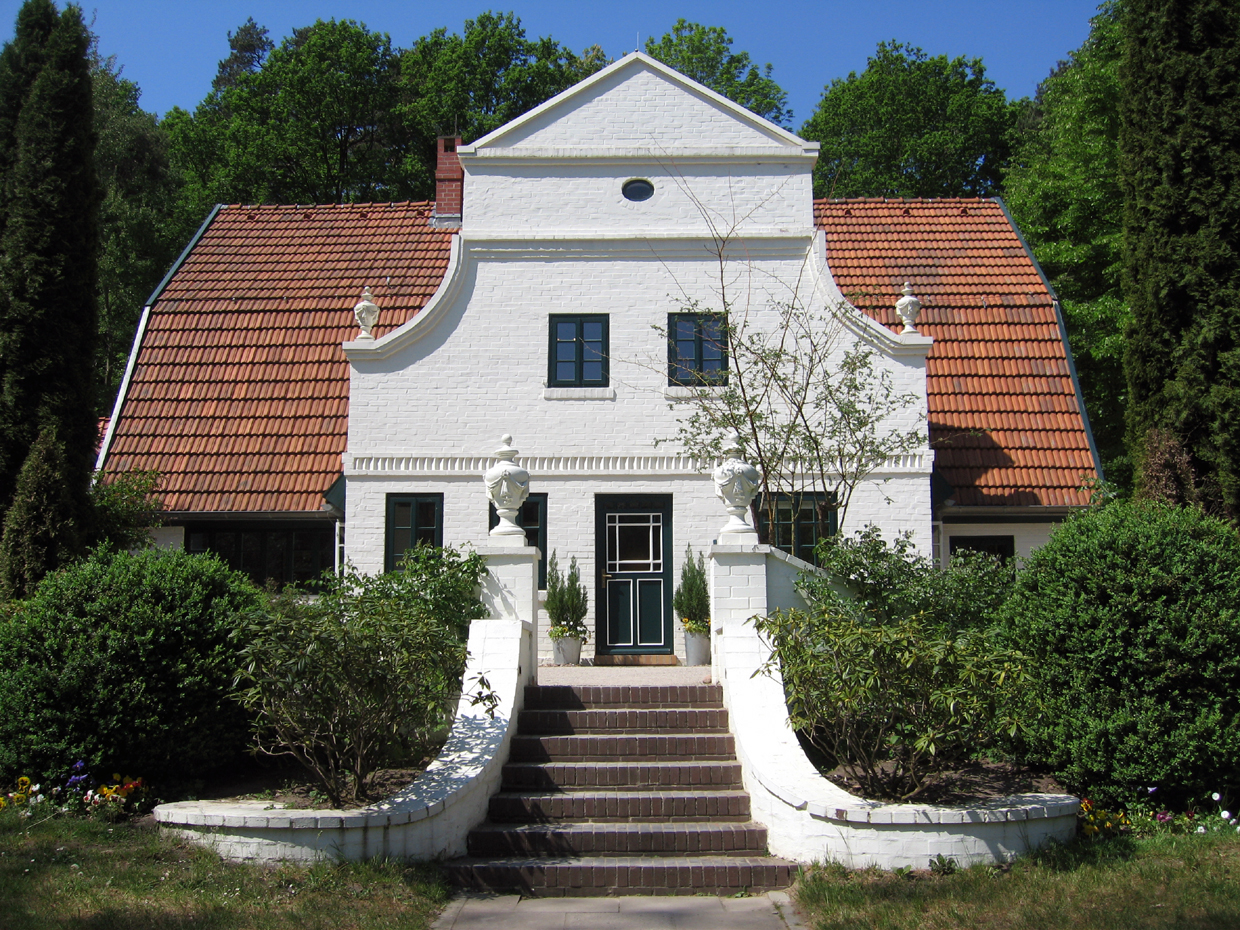
The Barkenhoff in Worpswede, 2007

In 1933, the Rote Hilfe had 530,000 members, of which 119,000 were also members of the KPD and 15,000 were members of the SPD. There were also 55,600 members who were also in the MOPR.

From 1924 to March 1929, the Rote Hilfe supported 27,000 people and 16,000 people in prison at a cost of four million Reichsmarks (equivalent to 15 million 2021 euros). There was a drop in membership in 1929, the result of partisan fighting. In 1932, the Rote Hilfe helped 9,000 political prisoners, 20,000 family members and 50,000 people on the left with preliminary investigations and trials. Its central committee was connected with the KPD's "juridical central office" and also worked with the Berlin MOPR.

Beginning in 1923, the Rote Hilfe maintained the Barkenhoff children's home at the Worpswede artists' colony after Heinrich Vogeler conveyed his property to them for a mere 15,000 goldmarks. In 1925, they began also maintaining the MOPR Children's Home in Elgersburg, as well. The two homes were managed by a 46-person administrative board, which included such well-known members as Albert Einstein and Thomas Mann.

The Rote Hilfe Deutschland community drew active support by about 600 notable individuals from democratic and leftist intellectual circles. Their campaigns, such as the amnesty for political prisoners in 1928, for freedom in the arts, or in favor of liberalizing the law on abortion were supported by Albert Einstein, Kurt Tucholsky, Käthe Kollwitz, Heinrich Zille, Heinrich Mann, Erich Mühsam, Magnus Hirschfeld, Otto Dix, Max Liebermann, Erwin Piscator, Carl von Ossietzky, Heinrich Vogeler and others.

== The lawyers ==
Hans Litten was especially well known for his activity with the Rote Hilfe. In a series of major political trials during the mid-1920s and into the early 1930s, he doggedly pursued justice for the leftist victims of the growing Nazi terror, once summoning even Adolf Hitler to appear as a witness. By the end of the Weimar Republic, Litten was unable to go out in public without a bodyguard. This was provided by members of the Rotfrontkämpferbund.

During the period of its activity, some 330 attorneys worked for the Rote Hilfe. Of these, 60% were of Jewish background, a fact that had special significance after 7 August 1933, when the Law for the Restoration of the Professional Civil Service came into effect and many lost their license to practice in German courts. (First World War veterans were able to continue till the end of 1941 as lay lawyers.) Other lawyers were also affected by the law for reasons of Communist activity, many becoming corporate lawyers after losing their license to practice in court.

According to Josef Schwarz, 22 of its lawyers were sent to Nazi concentration camps. Only a few of the Jewish lawyers who hadn't left Germany by 1942 survived the camps. Two lawyers who moved to the Soviet Union later became victims of the Stalinist purges. Some 30 of the lawyers who went into exile later returned to Germany, nine of them to the German Democratic Republic.

== Trials and campaigns ==
- "German Cheka Trial" (February–April 1925) against KPD members accused of high treason
- Series of trials resulting from the Hamburg Uprising (January–May 1925)
- 1926 "Free Max Hoelz and all political Prisoners" – amnesty campaign
- 1929 Berlin "Blutmai" Trial
- 1931 Saxon "Weapons Cache Trial" on the leftist take-over of a Der Stahlhelm camp on Reichswehr property
- 1932 "Röntgenstraßen Trial" – involving a murdered SA man
- 1932 "Felseneck Trial" – murder trial resulting from the SA attack of an arbor colony inhabited by SPD and KPD members
- Defense in other trials about "freedom of art", for the SPD and Reichsbanner Schwarz-Rot-Gold members

== See also ==
- Rote Hilfe e.V.

== Publications ==
- Material über den Hitlerdeutschland, Rote Hilfe Deutschland (February 1936), a compilation of allegations of murder and other crimes at Dachau, Börgermoor and Kemna concentration camps
