= Irmgard Litten =

German writer (1879–1953)

Irmgard Litten (née Wust; 30 August 1879 – 30 June 1953) was a German writer.

== Career ==
Her husband was Friedrich Litten, a German jurist. She was the mother of Hans Litten. Her account of her son's persecution and torture under the Nazi regime, and her efforts to support him, was published in Paris under the title Die Hölle sieht dich an: Der Fall Litten. An English translation, A Mother Fights Hitler, was published the same year in London. The American edition, titled Beyond Tears, was published in September 1940, with an added introduction and epilogue urging America to confront the threat of Nazi Germany.
