= Online book rental =

Online book rental is a service wherein users rent books via the internet. Users browse books online and have their choices home-delivered, rather than physically visiting a library to borrow a book. This e-commerce model is comparable to the video rental service provided Netflix.

In 2009, online book rental was gaining popularity in India, with a number of websites offering free doorstep delivery for a small monthly fee. The popularity of such websites can be attributed to increasing internet usage in the country; India is expected to have the third-largest number of internet users in the world by 2013. Statistics for the publishing industry are also promising. India is the world's third-largest market for English books, and its entire book market — in English, as well as regional languages — is estimated to generate Rs. 10,000 crore annually. The online book market in India is expected to grow at 30–35% annually for the next five years.

In the United States, Amazon.com offered a textbook rental system for students, but retired the program in 2022.

== Rental system ==
Online book-rental services save time by delivering books to a member's home or office. In addition to convenience, the service also offers an ease-of-use benefit; membership on most websites involves a simple registration form and payment through bank transfer or cash on delivery. This is important in a market that does not yet trust internet-based monetary transactions. Once membership is paid the user logs in to browse books, and clicks the "rent" button to receive the chosen books at home. The books are collected when the user logs in to indicate that he or she has finished reading. Another advantage of online rental services is that most do not have any due dates or late fees; borrowers may keep books for as long as they wish, provided they pay the regular subscription.

This era is changing, edits being made with education book selling. Engineering books are often taken on rent for a semester or 2 and returned after use. With the online space roaring, newer start ups have emerged in online book renting. In engineering book stores, you order books and pay Cash on Delivery, after usage you collect back up to 70% of the invoice back.

== Presence ==
Online libraries and rental companies have come with a national presence and are trying to reach other smaller cities by using courier companies and the postal service to deliver books. These new ventures have become popular with the trend towards internet-based marketing; almost all have their own blogs and Facebook pages. Ventures like Pustakkosh, Justbooks are major national level players in Indian online book rental scenario.

== Electronic versus print books ==
There is speculation as to the survival of these ventures, as more people use Amazon Kindle and read books online. However, most book-lovers prefer a physical book, and this is the premise on which these new ventures are based. Their success remains to be seen; however, they offer a ray of hope for young professionals in the country who currently lack access to books. Apart from the metropolitan areas, most cities and towns in India do not have good, well-stocked public libraries. For the residents of these cities, such ventures may offer an economical way to bridge the gap.
