= Friedrich Litten =

Friedrich Julius Litten
- Born: 22 February 1873; Elbing, West Prussia, German Empire (Elbląg, Poland)
- Died: February 1940 (aged 66–67); Belfast, Northern Ireland
- Education: Leipzig Freiburg Königsberg
- Spouse: Irmgard Litten
- Children: Hans Litten

Friedrich Julius Litten (22 February 1873 – February 1940) was a German jurist and a university college teacher. His father was Joseph Litten, the president of the Jewish community in Königsberg from 1899 to 1906. He married Irmgard Litten from an established Lutheran family in Swabia, the daughter of Albert Wüst, a professor at the University of Halle-Wittenberg.

Fritz was born and raised Jewish, but converted to Lutheranism in order to further his career as a law professor. He was a nationalist conservative, and served in the army in World War I, earning the Iron Cross, 1st and 2nd Class. He opposed the postwar Weimar Republic. A distinguished jurist and professor of Roman and civil law, he was dean of Königsberg's law school, later becoming rector of that institution. He was also an adviser to the Prussian government. Litten and his wife, Irmgard, were the parents of Hans Litten.
