= Belle du Seigneur (film) =

- Directed by: Glenio Bonder
- Written by: Glenio Bonder
- Based on: Belle du Seigneur by Albert Cohen
- Produced by: Thierry de Navacelle; Jimmy de Brabant
- Starring: Jonathan Rhys Meyers; Natalia Vodianova; Marianne Faithfull; Ed Stoppard
- Cinematography: Eduardo Serra
- Edited by: Philippe Ravoet
- Music by: Gabriel Yared
- Release date: 2012
- Running time: 104 minutes
- Countries: France; Luxembourg; Germany; Belgium; Switzerland; United Kingdom
- Language: English

Belle du Seigneur is a 2012 romantic drama film written and directed by Glenio Bonder and starring Jonathan Rhys Meyers, Natalia Vodianova, Marianne Faithfull and Ed Stoppard. It is based Albert Cohen’s novel of the same title.

== Cast ==
- Jonathan Rhys Meyers as Solal
- Natalia Vodianova as Ariane
- Marianne Faithfull as Mariette
- Ed Stoppard as Adrien

== Production ==
In September 2010, it was announced that Meyers, Vodianova and Faithfull were cast in the film.

On November 1, 2010, it was announced that filming had begun.

Filming occurred in Camogli in November 2010.

== Reception ==
Jordan Mintzer of The Hollywood Reporter gave the film a negative review and wrote as the bottom line: “Handsomely mounted period piece is both bloated and bland.”
