= Never Give a Sucker an Even Break =

1941 film by Edward F. Cline

- Theatrical poster
- Directed by: Edward F. Cline
- Screenplay by: John T. Neville; Prescott Chaplin
- Story by: "Otis Criblecoblis" (W. C. Fields)
- Produced by: Jack Gross
- Starring: W. C. Fields; Gloria Jean; Leon Errol
- Cinematography: Charles Van Enger
- Edited by: Arthur Hilton
- Music by: Charles Previn; Frank Skinner
- Production company: Universal Pictures
- Distributed by: Universal Pictures
- Release date: October 10, 1941 (U.S.)
- Running time: 70-70.5 minutes
- Country: United States
- Language: English

Never Give a Sucker an Even Break is a 1941 American comedy film directed by Edward F. Cline and starring W. C. Fields, Gloria Jean, and Leon Errol. Fields also wrote the original story, under the pseudonym Otis Criblecoblis. Fields plays himself, promoting an extravagant screenplay he has written. As he describes the script to a skeptical producer, the often surreal scenes are shown. It was produced and distributed by Universal Pictures.

The title is derived from lines from two earlier films. In Poppy (1936), he tells his daughter "If we should ever separate, my little plum, I want to give you just one bit of fatherly advice: Never give a sucker an even break!" In You Can't Cheat an Honest Man (1939), he tells a customer that his grandfather's last words, "just before they sprung the trap", were "You can't cheat an honest man; never give a sucker an even break, or smarten up a chump."

During his Hollywood career, Fields fought with studio producers, directors, and writers over the content of his films. He was determined to make a movie his way, with his own script and staging and his choice of supporting players. Pleased with the success of his previous film, The Bank Dick (1940), Universal finally gave him the chance, and Never Give a Sucker an Even Break was the result. Fields himself cast most of the supporting actors. He chose Universal's young singing star Gloria Jean to play his niece and hired two of his favorite comedians, Leon Errol and Franklin Pangborn, to play supporting roles. Margaret Dumont, best known as the matronly foil for the Marx Brothers, was cast as the haughty Mrs. Hemogloben. Universal paid Fields a total of $150,000 for this film; $125,000 for his performance and $25,000 for his original story. In some international releases it was known by the alternative title What a Man!

== Plot ==
At the Hollywood studios of Esoteric Pictures, W.C. Fields, playing himself, is seen admiring a billboard advertising his previous film The Bank Dick (1940). He encounters various hecklers and minor calamities, including a rude, sassy diner waitress, whom he calls "Blimpy Pie." Gloria Jean, his devoted niece, is on her way to rehearse some songs at the studio, where she demonstrates her classically trained coloratura soprano. Fields is also on the premises to pitch his surreal movie script to Mr. Pangborn, an excitable producer with Esoteric Pictures.

As Pangborn reads through the script, the story comes to life in a series of scenes. Fields and Gloria Jean are flying to an exotic location on an airplane, which Fields' script specifies has a unique open-air, rear observation deck. On the plane, Fields has encounters with a couple of eccentric characters: a tweedy Englishman and a corpulent Turk in the lower berth, whom Fields hits with a croquet mallet, then manages to convince him that the Englishman did it. At one point, Gloria Jean asks Uncle Bill why he never married, and he answers "I was in love with a beautiful blonde once, dear. She drove me to drink. That's the one thing I'm indebted to her for." When Fields accidentally drops his flask over the side of the plane's observation deck, he jumps after it, eventually catching up to it. He lands safely in a secluded "nest", atop a high cliff and occupied by a young, beautiful blonde who has never seen a man and her protective, cynical mother, Mrs. Hemoglobin. After the plane lands, Gloria Jean receives a phone call from Fields directing her to the Russian village at the bottom of the cliff where she sings the Russian song, "Ochi Chernye" to a group of peasants. She is reunited with Fields in the village, where he has learned that Mrs. Hemoglobin is very wealthy. Fields returns to Mrs. Hemoglobin's clifftop "nest", and finds a rival suitor who is also after her money. Fields disposes of his rival by kicking him over the cliff. Fields is about to marry Mrs. Hemoglobin when Gloria Jean takes him aside and convinces him that this is a bad idea and they make a swift exit.

At this point, Pangborn has had enough of the absurd script and yells at Fields, telling him to leave the studio. Fields goes to a soda fountain to drown his sorrows in an ice cream soda. Breaking the fourth wall, Fields remarks to the audience, "This scene is supposed to be in a saloon, but the censor cut it out!"

Back at the studio, when Gloria Jean learns Fields has been sent away, she tells the flustered Pangborn that she will quit if her uncle is fired. She and Fields make plans to travel, and she goes into a shop to buy some new clothes. Just then, a middle-aged matron asks for help getting to the maternity hospital, where her daughter is about to give birth. Fields volunteers, thinking the matron is in distress, and she takes the back seat of his car. He speeds her through the streets and expressways of Los Angeles, where he tangles with pedestrians, cars, and a hook-and-ladder fire truck. When his passenger passes out, Fields drives even more urgently. He arrives at the hospital, wrecking his car in the process, with his passenger shaken but unhurt. Gloria Jean, who has just arrived in a taxi, asks Uncle Bill if he's all right. He replies "Good thing I didn't have an accident. I'd never have gotten here." Gloria Jean smiles and says to the audience "My Uncle Bill...but I still love him!"

== Cast ==
- W. C. Fields as The Great Man, W. C. Fields / Uncle Bill
- Gloria Jean as Gloria Jean, his niece
- Franklin Pangborn as Mr. Pangborn, the producer
- Margaret Dumont as Mrs. Hemoglobin
- Leon Errol as Leon, Fields' rival for Mrs. Hemoglobin
- Susan Miller as Ouilotta Delight Hemoglobin
- Billy Lenhart and Kenneth Brown as His Hecklers (credited as Butch and Buddy)
- Mona Barrie as Mrs. Pangborn, the producer's wife
- Charles Lang as Peter Carson, the young engineer
- Anne Nagel as Madame Gorgeous, Gloria Jean's mother
- Jody Gilbert as The Waitress
- Irving Bacon as Tom, the soda jerk
- Minerva Urecal as Mrs. Pastrami, the cleaning woman
- Nell O'Day as Salesgirl
- Emmett Vogan as Steve Roberts, the engineer
- Carlotta Monti as Pangborn's Receptionist

Uncredited:

- Leon Belasco as Gloria Jean's accompanist
- Dave Willock as Johnson, the movie director
- Jack Lipson as The Turkish Plane Passenger
- Claud Allister as The British Plane Passenger
- Kay Deslys as Mrs. Wilson, visiting the hospital
- Michael Visaroff as a Russian Peasant
- Richard Alexander as A Burly Man

Cast notes:

- Carlotta Monti, who plays Pangborn's receptionist, was Fields' mistress. She later wrote an autobiography that was made into the 1976 film W. C. Fields and Me, which starred Rod Steiger and Valerie Perrine.

== Songs ==
Gloria Jean sings the following songs in this film:

- "Estrellita" ("Little Star") – in Spanish, music and lyrics by M. M. Ponce
- "Voices of Spring" – music by Johann Strauss II, with special lyrics in English
- "Hot Cha Cha" – nonsense song by Universal's musical director Charles Previn
- ""Очи чёрные" ("Ochi chyornye" or "Dark Eyes") – in Russian, traditional Russian folk song

== Production ==
Fields' preferred title for the film was The Great Man, which also had been his original title for The Bank Dick, but this title again was rejected by Universal. When the title was changed, Fields was afraid that "Never Give a Sucker an Even Break" would not fit on theater marquees, and it would be abbreviated to "W. C. Fields - Sucker".

Fields' first version of the script was only 12 pages long; Universal told him to expand it, which Fields' did, to 96 pages. This was still not enough, so Fields hired screenwriters John T. Neville and Prescott Chaplin to expand it. This version came in at 156 pages. This was the version of the script that was rejected in April, 1941 by the Hays Office because it was "filled with vulgar and suggestive scenes and dialogue" and had "innumerable jocular references to drinking and liquor", the producer was referred to as a "pansy", and the Fields character ogled women's breasts and legs. The censors also objected to "all dialogue and showing of bananas and pineapples", which they felt was "a play upon an obscene story." A revised script was approved two months later. The studio hired a number of writers to continue work on the script, none of them credited, but Fields hated their version, calling it "the worst script I ever read." He was inclined to "throw it in their faces", but director Eddie Cline told him not to—he would shoot Fields's own script, and the studio wouldn't know the difference, which was the case. Fields did sneak in a gag that got around The Breen Office's edict that a "raspberry sound" could not be made onscreen; the scene featured a fruit peddler crying "Raspberries!" as a leaky tire on his cart spurted jets of air that resembled the forbidden sound.

== Aftermath ==
After the positive reception of Fields' previous Universal picture, The Bank Dick, the studio had touted The Great Man as one of its major features of the year, to be released during the holiday season of 1941. "That was the plan until the studio heads saw the film," reported Gloria Jean's biographers. "In late September they conveniently forgot about their bonded schedule, changed the title from The Great Man back to Never Give a Sucker an Even Break, and moved the release date up to October 10, placing the Fields film among a succession of lesser releases... Universal, deciding that this would be Fields's last picture at the studio, gave a choice November release date to Olsen and Johnson instead. Sucker became a non-event." Parts of the film were reshot without Fields's participation and was re-edited and rearranged into a crazy-quilt of comedy sequences. "By keeping the film as nonsensical as possible, like [Olsen and Johnson's] Hellzapoppin', Universal could bridge Fields's chaotic continuity and gloss over his occasional absences." The outrageously zany film played to mixed reviews but is today considered one of Fields's classics. It has been called "a thinly disguised attack on the Hollywood studio system."

Upon release in October 1941, columnist Ted Strauss in The New York Times wrote "We are not yet quite sure that this latest opus is even a movie – no such harum-scarum collection of song, slapstick and thumbnail sketches has defied dramatic law in recent history. We are more certain that at its worst the film is extravagantly bad, no less that William Claude is wonderful...Yes, some parts of the film you will find incomprehensibly silly. Probably you also will laugh your head off." Writing in Time, critic James Agee stated, " ... it is strong drink for cinemaddicts who believe that the Great Man can do no wrong ... Sucker has no plot and needs none ... That much of it is truly comic is testimony to the fact that Comedian Fields is one of the funniest men on earth ... Fields is a beautifully timed exhibit of mock pomposity, puzzled ineffectualness, subtle understatement and true-blue nonchalance."

Never Give a Sucker an Even Break was Fields's last starring role. Now 61 years old and in declining health, he frequently had to recuperate in his dressing room between takes, a lifetime of alcoholism having taken its toll. Fields was planning his next film, with Gloria Jean and Anne Nagel from the cast of Sucker slated to star with him but after the lukewarm reception to Sucker, Universal dropped him. By the time Sucker was released in late 1941, the studio had made four films with the increasingly popular Abbott and Costello and Universal no longer needed Fields.

The climactic fire engine chase sequence from this film was actually lifted and used (with some judicious editing) in Abbott and Costello's 1944 Universal picture, In Society.
