= Jonathan Rhys Meyers =

Irish actor (born 1977)

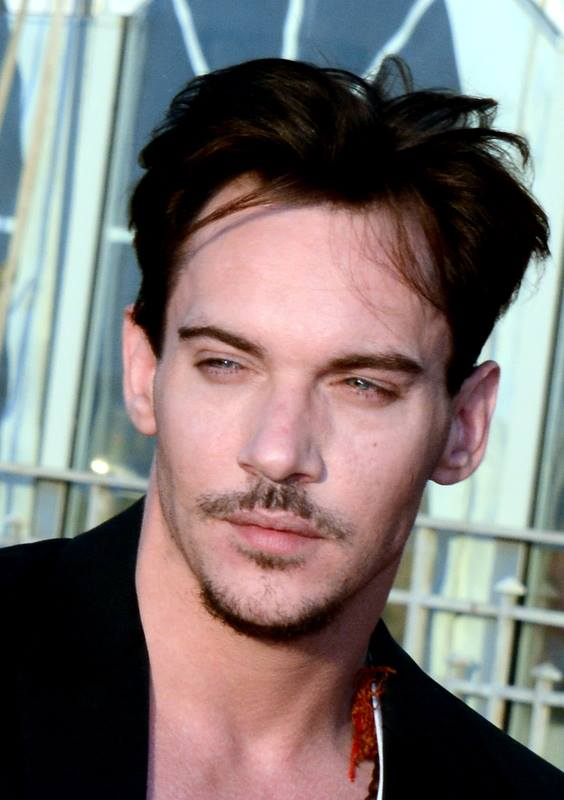
- Meyers at the Cabourg Film Festival in June 2013
- Born: Jonathan Michael Francis O'Keeffe; 27 July 1977 (age 49); County Cork, Ireland
- Occupations: Actor; singer
- Years active: 1994–present
- Spouse: Mara Lane (m. 2016; sep. 2022)
- Children: 1

Jonathan Rhys Meyers (born Jonathan Michael Francis O'Keeffe; 27 July 1977) is an Irish actor. He is known for his roles in the films Michael Collins (1996), Velvet Goldmine (1998), Titus (1999), Bend It Like Beckham (2002), Alexander (2004), Match Point (2005), Mission: Impossible III (2006) and his television roles as Elvis Presley in the biographical miniseries Elvis (2005), for which he won a Golden Globe Award and earned a Primetime Emmy Award nomination, as King Henry VIII in the historical drama The Tudors (2007–10), which earned him two Golden Globe Award nominations, and in the NBC drama series Dracula (2013–14) as the title character. He also starred as Bishop Heahmund, a character inspired by the Saint of the same name, in the History Channel television series Vikings.

Meyers has continued to star in other films, such as Albert Nobbs in 2011. In 2013, Meyers appeared as the villain Valentine Morgenstern in The Mortal Instruments: City of Bones, based on Cassandra Clare's novel, City of Bones; he appeared in the 2015 film Stonewall, directed by Roland Emmerich; in 2017, he starred in The 12th Man; and in 2018 he won the Best Actor award at the Manchester Film Festival for his starring role in Damascus Cover. In 2020, he was listed as number 44 on The Irish Times' list of Ireland's greatest film actors.

Meyers has been the face of several Hugo Boss advertising campaigns. He has also been involved in several charitable causes, including the Hope Foundation and the children's charity Barretstown. Meyers was married to Mara Lane, and they have one son together.

== Early life and education ==
Meyers was born on 27 July 1977 in Dublin, Ireland, the first of four boys for Geraldine (née Myers; 1957–2007) and folk musician John O'Keeffe, and brought up in County Cork. His family is Catholic, and his three younger brothers are professional musicians. He attended North Monastery Christian Brothers School.

After being expelled from North Monastery for truancy, he spent much of his time working and socialising in pool halls. Casting agents looking for Irish boys to appear in War of the Buttons spotted him at a Cork pool hall, the Victoria Sporting Club, and invited him to audition. Although passed over for War of the Buttons, the casting agents encouraged him to pursue a career in acting.

== Career ==
=== Early work (1994–2004) ===
O'Keeffe adopted the stage name Jonathan Rhys Meyers because he thought his real name was boring. His first acting role came in the film A Man of No Importance (1994). In 1996, he appeared in Michael Collins, as the Anti-Treaty IRA sniper who kills the title character. He played a David Bowie-inspired glam rock star in Velvet Goldmine (1998). He appeared in B. Monkey as Bruno, a small-time petty thief/criminal. In 1999, he appeared in Ride with the Devil as psychopathic Bushwhacker Pitt Mackeson, and in Titus as the sadistic Goth prince Chiron. He starred as Steerpike in the BBC's Gormenghast (2000); played a dedicated girls' football coach in Bend It Like Beckham (2002); played in Vanity Fair (2004) opposite Reese Witherspoon; and co-starred in 2004 in Oliver Stone's epic Alexander in which he played Cassander.

=== Breakthrough with Match Point and The Tudors (2005–2017) ===
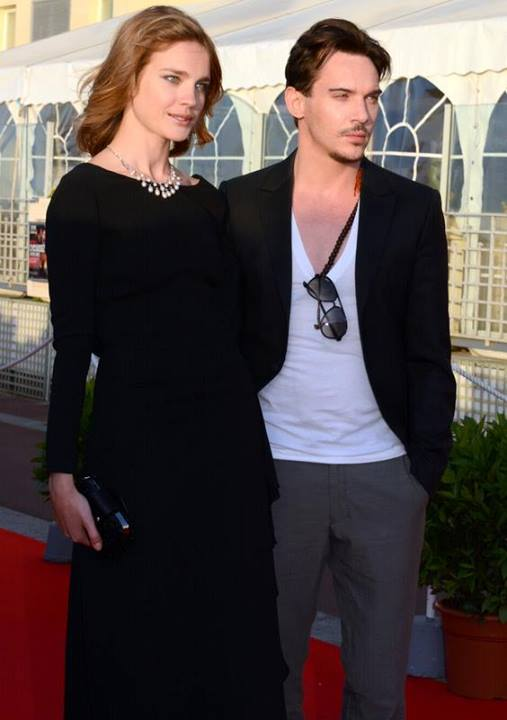
Meyers with Natalia Vodianova at the premiere of Belle du Seigneur in 2013

The following year Meyers starred in Woody Allen's drama Match Point (2005), for which he received a Chopard Trophy at the Cannes Film Festival, and in the CBS four-hour miniseries Elvis (2005) as Elvis Presley alongside Randy Quaid as Colonel Tom Parker, but did not sing for his role in the miniseries. The latter earned him an Emmy nomination and a Golden Globe win. In 2006, he appeared in Mission: Impossible III.

He starred in the CBC/Showtime co-production The Tudors (2007) as Henry VIII. He was nominated for the Golden Globe for Best Actor in a Television Drama in 2007 for the role.

Subsequent projects include August Rush (2007). In 2008, he appeared in The Children of Huang Shi, and in 2010, Shelter and From Paris with Love.

In 2011, he starred as Solal in Belle du Seigneur, an English language film adaptation of Albert Cohen's novel Belle du Seigneur. The film was released in Russia on 29 November 2012 and in France on 19 June 2013 after premiering at the Champs Elysees Film Festival.

In 2013, Meyers was cast as Dracula in NBC's television series Dracula alongside Oliver Jackson-Cohen and Jessica De Gouw. It was also announced in May 2013 that Meyers was to participate in the recording of his brothers' album entitled Blossom, which was released on 21 April 2014.

On 23 October 2014, he received The Irish Post Legend Award at the London Hilton on Park Lane in recognition of his remarkable achievements in film and television over the previous 20 years.

In 2017, He starred in the movie Black Butterfly and was nominated for Best Supporting Actor at the Madrid International Festival. Meyers later reunited with Michael Hirst and starred as Bishop Heahmund in the television series Vikings.

=== Independent films and varied roles (2018–present) ===
Meyers played the lead in the spy thriller Damascus Cover, based on the novel by Howard Kaplan. It premiered on 23 September 2017, at the Boston Film Festival and was released on July 20, 2018 by Vertical Entertainment. he won the best actor award at Boston and Manchester International Festival

Meyers portrays Patrick Pearse, a political activist and one of the leaders of the bloody 1916 Irish Easter Rising, in the centennial commemoration biopic film The Rising, written and produced by Kevin McCann.

In 2020, Meyers played in Edge of the World, a biographical picture of the British explorer Sir James Brooke, as well as the lead role in the movie American Night, a neo-noir thriller co-starring Emile Hirsch, Paz Vega, and Jeremy Piven.

In 2021, he starred as Shiro in Yakuza Princess, a Brazilian action thriller film directed by Vicente Amorim based on the graphic novel Samurai Shiro by Danilo Beyruth. He also starred in the horror-thriller Hide and Seek.

In 2022, he starred in The Good Neighbour and Wifelike.

In 2023, he starred in the thriller "Disquiet" with Rachelle Goulding. Meyers also starred in the hijacking thriller film 97 Minutes, directed by Timo Vuorensola.

=== Music ===
A self-taught singer and guitarist, Meyers has appeared in a number of musical roles. His first such role was as "Brian Slade" in Velvet Goldmine; two of the songs he sang ("Baby's on Fire" and "Tumbling Down") are on the film's soundtrack. He sang briefly in the television mini-series version of The Magnificent Ambersons, performed in studio scenes of the miniseries Elvis and played the flute in Gormenghast.

In the 2007 music drama August Rush, he performed on-screen as singer-songwriter Louis Connelly and is credited for four songs on the soundtrack – "Break", "Moondance", "Something Inside" and "This Time". Of the four, "This Time" and "Break" were considered in the Best Original Song category of the 80th Academy Awards. "This Time" was not released as a single but peaked at number 84 in the Canadian Hot 100.

==== Upcoming projects ====
In 2022, it was revealed that he would be joining the cast of the thriller Altitude.

== Personal life ==
=== Relationships and family ===
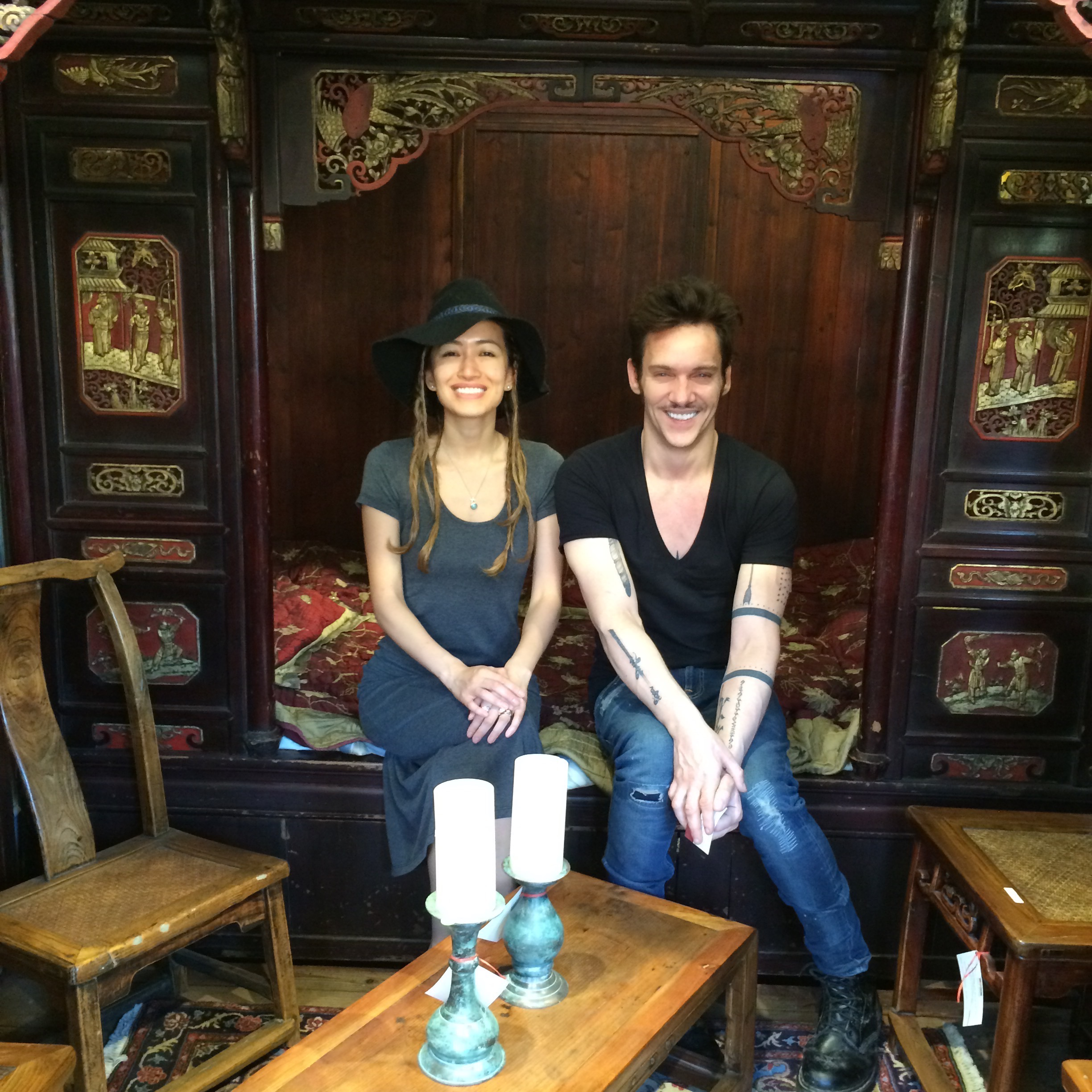
Mara Lane and Jonathan Rhys Meyers in 2019

For a year in the late 1990s, Meyers dated his Velvet Goldmine co-star Toni Collette. From 2004 until 2012, he was in a relationship with Reena Hammer that started when she was 17 years old and he was 27. Reena is the daughter of makeup artist Ruby Hammer.

On 20 November 2007, his mother, Mary Geraldine O'Keeffe, died at Mercy University Hospital, Cork, aged 51, following a short, undisclosed illness.

On 30 June 2011, it was reported that Meyers had been taken to hospital by ambulance after a suspected suicide attempt. In 2016, a second attempt was suspected when paramedics, responding to an emergency call, found him slumped on the floor. Anonymous sources variously claimed and denied that Meyers intended to take his own life.

In 2016, Meyers married Mara Lane. Their son was born in December 2016. In September 2017, Lane said she had miscarried a second child. Meyers and Lane separated in 2022.

In 2022, Myers listed his Nichols Canyon home in Los Angeles for sale. It was reported that the home had previously been listed for sale and was made available as a rental property until being listed for $1.6 million in 2012 and for $1.795 million in 2018. The 2022 listing had the home for sale at $1.85 million.

Meyers lost his home in Malibu to wildfires in 2025.

As of 2026, Meyers resides in Wexford, Ireland.

=== Issues with alcohol ===
In 2007, Meyers' representative confirmed that Meyers had entered an alcohol-treatment programme. In November 2007, he was arrested at Dublin Airport for intoxication and disturbing the peace.

In 2009, he was detained in Paris by police for allegedly assaulting an airport lounge employee while drunk. In 2010, at John F. Kennedy International Airport, he verbally abused and used racist language against airline staff and officials, who had refused him access to the boarding area after he had become intoxicated in the first-class lounge. United Airlines banned him as a result. His representative confirmed Meyers was receiving treatment again in 2010. In November 2011, he was ordered by a French court to pay restitution of €1,000 and was given a judgment of a suspended sentence for public intoxication 24 months earlier.

After his wife suffered a miscarriage in 2017, Meyers relapsed at Dublin Airport. In 2018, he broke his sobriety on a flight, resulting in a dispute with his wife at Los Angeles International Airport. In an interview with Larry King later that year, Meyers addressed the incident, saying, "I shouldn't drink. It doesn't suit me and I had been sober for a long time." He insisted that he had learned his lesson and was sober again. Meyers crashed his car in Malibu, California, in November 2020 and was charged with two drunk driving offences.

== Honours ==
On 5 October 2008, Meyers received an Honorary Patronage from the Trinity College Philosophical Society in Dublin.

In 2014, he was honoured at The Irish Post Awards by the presentation of the Legend Award for his contributions to the film and entertainment industry.

== Charity work ==
In February 2008, Meyers was named the ambassador for the Hope Foundation, a charity formed in his native Cork to support the street children of Calcutta.

He is also an ambassador for the Irish children’s charity Barretstown which supports children affected by serious illness. In 2019, he and fellow actor Aidan Gillen helped launch Barretstown's new Press Play campaign which aimed to raise additional funds to serve more children and their families.

== Filmography ==
=== Film ===
Year	Title	Role(s)	Director(s)
1994	A Man of No Importance	First Young Man	Suri Krishnamma
1996	Michael Collins	Denis "Sonny" O'Neill (Collins' Assassin)	Neil Jordan
1996	Killer Tongue	Rudolph	Alberto Sciamma
1996	The Disappearance of Finbar	Finbar Flynn	Sue Clayton
1997	The Maker	Josh Minnell	Tim Hunter
1997	Telling Lies in America	Kevin Boyle	Guy Ferland
1998	Velvet Goldmine	Brian Slade	Todd Haynes
1998	The Governess	Henry Cavendish	Sandra Goldbacher
1998	The Tribe	Adam	Stephen Poliakoff
1998	B. Monkey	Bruno	Michael Radford
1999	The Loss of Sexual Innocence	Nic (aged 16)	Mike Figgis
1999	Ride with the Devil	Pitt Mackeson	Ang Lee
1999	Titus	Chiron	Julie Taymor
2001	Happy Now?	Mark Wraith	Philippa Cousins
2001	Prozac Nation	Noah	Erik Skjoldbjærg
2001	Tangled	Alan Hammond	Jay Lowi
2002	Bend It Like Beckham	Joe	Gurinder Chadha
2003	The Tesseract	Sean	Oxide Pang Chun
2003	I'll Sleep When I'm Dead	Davey Graham	Mike Hodges
2003	Octane	The Father	Marcus Adams
2003	The Emperor's Wife	Chamberlain	Julien Vrebos
2004	Vanity Fair	Capt. George Henry Osborne	Mira Nair
2004	Alexander	Cassander	Oliver Stone
2005	Match Point	Chris Wilton	Woody Allen
2006	Mission: Impossible III	Declan Gormley	J. J. Abrams
2007	August Rush	Louis Connelly	Kirsten Sheridan
2008	The Children of Huang Shi	George Hogg	Roger Spottiswoode
2008	A Film with Me in It	Pierce 2	Ian Fitzgibbon
2010	From Paris with Love	James Reese	Pierre Morel
2010	Shelter	Reverend Christian Moore/Adam Sabre/David Bernberg/Wesley Crite	Måns Mårlind & Björn Stein
2011	Albert Nobbs	Viscount Yarrell	Rodrigo García
2012	A Grand Affair	Solal	Glenio Bonder
2013	The Mortal Instruments: City of Bones	Valentine Morgenstern	Harald Zwart
2013	Another Me	John Moffatt	Isabel Coixet
2013	6 Souls	David	Måns Mårlind, Björn Stein
2015	Stonewall	Trevor	Roland Emmerich
2016	London Town	Joe Strummer	Derrick Borte
2017	The Shadow Effect	Reese	Obin & Amariah Olsen
2017	Black Butterfly	Jack	Brian Goodman
2017	Holy Lands	David	Amanda Sthers
2017	Damascus Cover	Ari Ben-Sion/Hans Hoffmann	Daniel Zelik Berk
2017	The 12th Man	Sturmbannführer Kurt Stage	Harald Zwart
2018	The Aspern Papers	Morton Vint	Julien Landais
2019	Awake	John Doe/Michael Winslow	Aleksandr Chernyaev
2021	Edge of the World	James Brooke	Michael Haussman
2021	Yakuza Princess	Shiro	Vicente Amorim
2021	American Night	John Kaplan	Alessio Della Valle
2021	The Survivalist	Ben Grant	Jon Keeyes
2021	Hide and Seek	Noah Blackwell	Joel David Moore
2022	The Good Neighbour	Robert	Stephan Rick
2022	Wifelike	William Bradwell	James Bird
2022	Dangerous Game: The Legacy Murders	Kyle	Sean McNamara
2023	Ambush	Miller	Mark Burman
2023	97 Minutes	Alex	Timo Vuorensola
2023	Food Fight	Charlie	Rexal Ford
2023	Mercy	Sean Quinn	Tony Dean Smith
2023	Disquiet	Sam	Michael Winnick
2024	The Clean Up Crew	Alex	Jon Keeyes
2024	Operation Blood Hunt	Murphy	Louis Mandylor
TBA	Eyes in the Trees	Vince Henway	Timothy Woodward Jr.
TBA	The Rising: 1916	Patrick Pearse	Kevin McCann
TBA	Run	Orson Reed	Steven C. Miller
TBA	Altitude	TBA	Mark Fienberg

=== Television ===
Year	Title	Role	Notes
1996	Samson and Delilah	Young Samson	Television film
2000	Gormenghast	Steerpike	Complete four-part BBC series (each episode one hour)
2002	The Magnificent Ambersons	George Amberson Minafer	Television film
2003	The Lion in Winter	King Philip II	Television film
2005	Elvis	Elvis Presley	Television film Golden Globe Award for Best Actor – Miniseries or Television Film; Satellite Award for Best Actor – Miniseries or Television Film; Nominated—Primetime Emmy Award for Outstanding Lead Actor in a Miniseries or a Movie
2007–2010	The Tudors	King Henry VIII	38 episodes Golden Nymph Award for Outstanding Actor in a Drama Series; Irish Film and Television Award for Best Actor on Television; Nominated—Golden Globe Award for Best Actor – Television Series Drama (2008–09); Nominated—Golden Nymph Award for Outstanding Actor in a Drama Series (2009–11); Nominated—Irish Film and Television Award for Best Actor on Television (2009–11)
2013–2014	Dracula	Dracula / Alexander Grayson	10 episodes Nominated—People's Choice Award for Favorite Actor in a New TV Series
2016	Roots	Tom Lea	3 episodes
2017–2019	Vikings	Heahmund	17 episodes

=== Discography ===
Musical contributions to films
Year	Soundtrack	Song	Ref.
1998	Velvet Goldmine	Tumbling Down	
1998	Velvet Goldmine	Baby's on Fire	
2007	August Rush	Break	
2007	August Rush	This Time	
2007	August Rush	Something inside	
2007	August Rush	Moondance	

== Awards and nominations ==
Year	Award	Category	Work	Result
1999	London Critics Circle Film Awards	British Newcomer of the Year	Velvet Goldmine	Nominated
2002	Venice Film Festival	Canal Grande Award for the Best Young Promising Actor	The Magnificent Ambersons	Won
2005	Satellite Awards	Outstanding Actor in a Miniseries or a Motion Picture Made for Television	Elvis	Won
2005	Primetime Emmy Awards	Outstanding Lead Actor in a Miniseries or a Movie	Elvis	Nominated
2005	Cannes Film Festival	Outstanding Newcomer	Match Point	Won
2006	GQ UK	Men of the Year Awards / Lab Series Man of the Year		Won
2006	Golden Globes Awards	Best Performance by an Actor in a Mini-Series or a Motion Picture Made for Television	Elvis	Won
2008	Monte-Carlo Television Festival	Outstanding Actor – Drama Series	The Tudors	Won
2008	Irish Film and Television Awards	Best Actor in a Lead Role in Television	The Tudors	Won
2008	Golden Globe Awards	Best Performance by an Actor in a Television Series – Drama	The Tudors	Nominated
2009	Monte-Carlo Television Festival	Outstanding Actor – Drama Series	The Tudors	Nominated
2009	Irish Film and Television Awards	Best Actor in a Lead Role in Television	The Tudors	Nominated
2009	Golden Globe Awards	Best Performance by an Actor in a Television Series – Drama	The Tudors	Nominated
2010	Irish Film and Television Awards	Best Actor in a Lead Role in Television	The Tudors	Nominated
2010	Monte-Carlo Television Festival	Outstanding Actor – Drama Series	The Tudors	Nominated
2011	Monte-Carlo Television Festival	Outstanding Actor – Drama Series	The Tudors	Nominated
2011	Irish Film and Television Awards	Best Actor in a Lead Role in Television	The Tudors	Nominated
2014	People's Choice Awards	Favorite Actor in a New TV Series	Dracula	Nominated
2017	Madrid International Film Festival	Best Supporting Actor	Black Butterfly	Nominated
2017	Boston Film Festival	Best Actor	Damascus Cover	Won
2018	Manchester Film Festival	Best Actor	Damascus Cover	Won
