= Disquiet =

Disquiet may refer to:

- Disquiet (Strugatsky novel), a 1965 sci-fi novel by Boris and Arkady Strugatsky
- Disquiet (Leigh novel), a 2008 novel by Julia Leigh
- Disquiet (album), a 2015 album by Irish rock band Therapy?
- Disquiet, a webzine about ambient electronic music edited by Marc Weidenbaum
- Disquiet (film), a 2023 American horror film starring Jonathan Rhys Meyers
