= Eduardo Serra =

Portuguese cinematographer (1943–2025)

Eduardo Serra GOIH
- Born: Eduardo Martins Serra; 2 October 1943; Lisbon, Portugal
- Died: 19 August 2025 (aged 81); Paris, France
- Occupation: Cinematographer
- Years active: 1971–2013

Eduardo Martins Serra GOIH (2 October 1943 – 19 August 2025) was a Portuguese cinematographer who spent most of his career working in European film productions, mostly in French, Portuguese and British films, with frequent collaborations with directors Patrice Leconte and Claude Chabrol.

Serra is also known for his work on the M. Night Shyamalan film Unbreakable and the final two Harry Potter films, The Deathly Hallows – Part 1 and Part 2.

== Life and career ==
From 1960 to 1963, Serra studied engineering at Lisbon's Instituto Superior Técnico, but he had to leave the country after his involvement in students' protests against Salazar's dictatorship. He settled in France, where he was accepted to Vaugirard film school in Paris; he graduated in 1966. In 1970 he got his second degree from the Paris-Sorbonne University, in Art History and Archeology.

Serra was twice nominated for the Academy Award for Best Cinematography. His first nomination was for his work on The Wings of the Dove (1997), for which he also won a BAFTA. He received his second Academy Award and BAFTA nominations for Girl with a Pearl Earring.

In 2004, Serra was made Commander of the Order of Prince Henry the Navigator, a civilian award presented for services to Portuguese culture, by President Jorge Sampaio. In 2017, President Marcelo Rebelo de Sousa, promoted him to the senior rank of Grand Officer of the same Order.

Serra died on 19 August 2025, at the age of 81.

== Filmography ==
Short film

Year	Title	Director
1976	Les derniers beaux jours	Jean-Yves Rondière
1980	Une voix	Dominique Crèvecoeur
1982	Une histoire dérisoire	Michel Campioli
1985	Duty Free Shop	Michel Campioli
1993	Die Inschrift des Gottes	Heinz Peter Schwerfel
2012	A Therapy	Roman Polanski

Feature film

Year	Title	Director	Notes
1980	À vendre	Christian Drillaud	
1983	No Trace of Sin	José Fonseca e Costa	
1983	Itinéraire bis	Christian Drillaud	
1983	Debout les crabes, la mer monte!	Jean-Jacques Grand-Jouan	
1984	Le garde du corps	François Leterrier	
1984	Pinot simple flic	Gérard Jugnot	
1984	Marche à l'ombre	Michel Blanc	
1985	Slices of Life	François Leterrier	
1985	Les Spécialistes	Patrice Leconte	1st collaboration with Leconte
1985	Contes clandestins	Dominique Crèvecoeur	With Dominique Chapuis and Gérard Sterin
1985	Le mariage du siècle	Philippe Galland	With Gérard Sterin
1985	Moi vouloir toi	Patrick Dewolf	
1987	Tant qu'il y aura des femmes	Didier Kaminka	
1988	A Mulher do Próximo	José Fonseca e Costa	
1988	Tropical Snow	Ciro Durán	
1990	The King's Trial	João Mário Grilo	
1990	The Hairdresser's Husband	Patrice Leconte	
1991	Lapse of Memory	Patrick Dewolf	
1992	Map of the Human Heart	Vincent Ward	
1992	Le zèbre	Jean Poiret	
1992	Amor e Dedinhos de Pé	Luís Filipe Rocha	
1993	Tango	Patrice Leconte	
1993	Artcore oder Der Neger	Heinz Peter Schwerfel	
1994	Le parfum d'Yvonne	Patrice Leconte	
1994	Dead Tired	Michel Blanc	
1995	Funny Bones	Peter Chelsom	
1995	L'amour conjugal	Benoît Barbier	
1996	Les Grands Ducs	Patrice Leconte	
1996	The Jew	Jom Tob Azulay	
1996	Jude	Michael Winterbottom	
1996	The Disappearance of Finbar	Sue Clayton	
1997	The Wings of the Dove	Iain Softley	
1997	The Swindle	Claude Chabrol	1st collaboration with Chabrol
1998	What Dreams May Come	Vincent Ward	
1999	The Color of Lies	Claude Chabrol	
2000	Passion of Mind	Alain Berliner	
2000	The Widow of Saint-Pierre	Patrice Leconte	
2000	Unbreakable	M. Night Shyamalan	
2002	Papillons de nuit	John Randolph Pepper	
2002	Rue des plaisirs	Patrice Leconte	
2002	O Delfim	Fernando Lopes	
2003	The Flower of Evil	Claude Chabrol	
2003	Girl with a Pearl Earring	Peter Webber	
2004	Intimate Strangers	Patrice Leconte	
2004	The Bridesmaid	Claude Chabrol	
2004	Beyond the Sea	Kevin Spacey	
2005	Il ne faut jurer de rien!	Eric Civanyan	
2006	Comedy of Power	Claude Chabrol	
2006	Blood Diamond	Edward Zwick	
2007	A Girl Cut in Two	Claude Chabrol	
2008	Defiance	Edward Zwick	
2009	Bellamy	Claude Chabrol	
2010	Harry Potter and the Deathly Hallows – Part 1	David Yates	Shot back-to-back
2011	Harry Potter and the Deathly Hallows – Part 2	David Yates	Shot back-to-back
2012	Belle du Seigneur	Glenio Bonder	
2013	A Promise	Patrice Leconte	

Documentary film

Year	Title	Director	Notes
1983	Des terroristes à la retraite	Mosco Boucault	With Guy-Auguste Boléat, François Catonné, Guy Chanel, Jean Orjollet, Philippe Rousselot and Carlo Varini
1984	Nasdine Hodja au pays du business	Jean-Patrick Lebel	
1986	I Grandi Manoveri	Heinz Peter Schwerfel	
2007	Fados	Carlos Saura	With Jose Luis Lopez-Linares

Television

Year	Title	Director	Notes
1987	Die dritte Dimension	Heinz Peter Schwerfel	Miniseries
1991	Cycle Simenon	Jacques Fansten	Episode "Le mouchoir de Joseph"

== Awards and nominations ==
Academy Awards

Year	Title	Category	Result
1997	The Wings of the Dove	Best Cinematography	Nominated
2003	Girl with a Pearl Earring	Best Cinematography	Nominated

American Society of Cinematographers

Year	Category	Result
2014	International Award	Won

Australian Academy of Cinema and Television Arts

Year	Category	Title	Result
1992	Map of the Human Heart	Best Cinematography	Nominated

BAFTA Awards

Year	Title	Category	Result
1997	The Wings of the Dove	Best Cinematography	Won
2003	Girl with a Pearl Earring	Best Cinematography	Nominated

British Society of Cinematographers

Year	Title	Category	Result
1997	The Wings of the Dove	Best Cinematography	Nominated
2003	Girl with a Pearl Earring	Best Cinematography	Nominated

Camerimage

Year	Title	Category	Result
1996	Jude	Golden Frog	Nominated
1996	Jude	Silver Frog	Won
1997	The Wings of the Dove	Golden Frog	Nominated
1997	The Wings of the Dove	Bronze Frog	Won

César Awards

Year	Title	Category	Result
1990	Le mari de la coiffeuse	Best Cinematography	Nominated

Satellite Awards

Year	Title	Category	Result
2003	Girl with a Pearl Earring	Best Cinematography	Nominated
2010	Harry Potter and the Deathly Hallows – Part 1	Best Cinematography	Nominated

== Distinctions ==
National orders

- Grand Officer of the Order of Prince Henry the Navigator (27 March 2017)
- Commander of the Order of Prince Henry the Navigator (5 March 2004)
