= Sue Clayton (disambiguation) =

Sue or Susan Clayton may refer to:

- Sue Clayton (Coronation Street), character in 1985 in UK tv soap opera Coronation Street
- Sue Clayton (film director), British film director
- Susan Clayton, psychologist, see Society for the Psychological Study of Social Issues
