= The Gospel of John (2014 film) =

British film by David Batty

- Directed by: David Batty
- Written by: John Goldsmith
- Produced by: Hannah Leader
- Starring: Selva Rasalingam
- Narrated by: David Harewood (NIV); Brian Cox (KJV)
- Cinematography: Ben Hodgson
- Edited by: Ben Hilton
- Music by: Amory Leader
- Distributed by: Lumo Project
- Release date: 1 December 2014
- Running time: 161 minutes
- Countries: United Kingdom; Canada; United States
- Language: Aramaic (faux) with English narration

The Gospel of John is a 2014 biblical film directed by David Batty with Selva Rasalingam in the role of Jesus. The film is an adaption of the Gospel of John, the fourth book of the New Testament in the Christian Bible.

The film was initially released on Netflix and then on DVD. There is a narration from the New International Version English Bible and there is secondary narration of the Gospel of John read by actor Brian Cox from the King James Version English Bible. It is one of four gospel films featuring the same cast that have been collectively dubbed into over 1500 languages.

The cast includes Mourad Zaoui, El Mahmoudi M'Barek, Karima Gouit, Goutou Hicham. Cinematography by Ben Hodgson. The Gospel of John is one of four Gospel films produced by the Lumo Project.

== See also ==
- The Gospel of John, a 2003 word-for-word film adaptation
