= The Disappearance of Finbar =

- Theatrical release poster
- Directed by: Sue Clayton
- Starring: Luke Griffin; Jonathan Rhys Meyers; Sean McGinley; Fanny Risberg
- Cinematography: Eduardo Serra
- Edited by: J. Patrick Duffner
- Music by: Davy Spillane
- Distributed by: Buena Vista International (Ireland); Film Four Distributors (United Kingdom)
- Release date: 12 August 1996
- Running time: 105 minutes
- Countries: Ireland; United Kingdom
- Language: English
- Budget: $4 million

The Disappearance of Finbar is a 1996 Irish mystery drama film directed by Sue Clayton and starring Jonathan Rhys Meyers in an early role. The film also features an appearance of Colin Farrell, in an uncredited role.

== Plot ==
Finbar and Danny are close childhood friends who live in a depressing neighbourhood in an Irish town. Finbar gets the chance to play soccer on a team going to Sweden but can't handle it and comes back. His family, friends and even he himself realise that he will get nowhere in life. His relationship to Danny gets worse. In an act of desperation one night he falls from a motorway bridge but a body is never found. Several years later, after wondering what happened to Finbar, Danny receives a mysterious phone call from Sweden. Danny disappears from his neighbourhood in the hope of solving the mystery, and traces the call to Stockholm. Not finding Finbar, Danny follows leads to the far north, to Lappland, looking for Finbar. Up there, he eventually finds Finbar and discovers a new life for himself. The friendship with Finbar has changed, their lives eventually separate. Finbar disappears again, and Danny realises that he has disappeared himself.

== Awards ==
The film won Best First Feature Award at the Madrid Film Festival 1997. The film also won the Audience Prize at Midnight Sun Film Festival, Finland, 1997, and Best New Feature at the Galway Film Festival 1997. Jonathan Rhys Meyers received a nomination for British Newcomer of the Year at the London Film Critics Circle Awards 1998.
