= Man on the Flying Trapeze =

1935 film by Clyde Bruckman, W. C. Fields

- Theatrical release poster
- Directed by: Clyde Bruckman; W. C. Fields (uncredited); Sam Hardy (uncredited)
- Written by: W. C. Fields (story, as "Charles Bogle"); Sam Hardy (story); Ray Harris; Jack Cunningham (uncredited); John Sinclair (uncredited); Bobby Vernon (uncredited)
- Produced by: William LeBaron
- Starring: W. C. Fields; Mary Brian; Kathleen Howard
- Cinematography: Alfred Gilks
- Edited by: Richard C. Currier
- Distributed by: Paramount Pictures
- Release date: August 3, 1935
- Running time: 65 minutes
- Country: United States
- Language: English

Man on the Flying Trapeze (UK title: The Memory Expert) is a 1935 American comedy film starring W. C. Fields as a henpecked husband who experiences a series of misadventures while taking a day off from work to attend a wrestling match. As with his other roles of this nature, Fields is put-upon throughout the film, but triumphs in the end. This was the final film directed by Clyde Bruckman.

== Plot ==
Ambrose Wolfinger works as a "memory expert" for a manufacturing company's president. He keeps track of details about the clients President Malloy meets with, so that Malloy will never be embarrassed about not remembering things when meeting with them. But Ambrose doesn't keep files; all the documents are a huge mess of paper piled on his desk. Ambrose supports himself, his shrewish wife Leona, his loving daughter Hope (from a previous marriage), his freeloading brother-in-law Claude, and his abusive, sternly teetotal mother-in-law Cordelia.

At the start of the film, two burglars break into Ambrose's cellar after midnight, get drunk on his homemade applejack, and start singing "On the Banks of the Wabash, Far Away". Ambrose is forced to handle the situation, and he winds up being arrested for distilling liquor without a license. While on the way to the night court Ambrose talks about the big wrestling match scheduled for that day, for which he has a front-row ticket.

After Hope pays his bail, Ambrose returns home in time to have breakfast before reporting for work. He asks Malloy for the afternoon off, falsely claiming that Cordelia has died and her funeral is that day. He begins explaining that she was taken with a "chill" and that he poured her a drink. His story is interrupted by Malloy, who misconstrues it as a case of death from poisoned liquor, and Ambrose is too timid to contradict him. Malloy lets him go for the day. Ambrose's supervisor, Mr. Peabody, tells his department the tragic news so they can send condolences, and also notifies the newspaper.

Ambrose has a series of misfortunes on his way to the wrestling match: He has encounters with ticket-writing policemen, he has a flat tire, and he is nearly hit by a train while chasing a runaway tire. Finally, while trying to get into the wrestling arena (Claude has stolen his ticket), he gets knocked down by a wrestler who is hurled out of the building by his opponent. As spectators exit the arena, Claude sees Ambrose sprawled on the sidewalk and sees Ambrose's secretary, who had attended the wrestling match separately, bent over him expressing concern over his injury.

Meanwhile, a huge number of flowers, sympathy cards, and funeral wreaths are delivered to the Wolfinger home. This puzzles Cordelia and Leona, and when they see Cordelia's obituary in the newspaper—under the headline "Aged Woman Victim of Poisoned Alcohol"—they are furious, and quickly fix the blame on Ambrose. Ambrose returns home to a harsh reception. He confesses to deceiving his boss, but when Claude announces that he saw Ambrose and the secretary "drunk in the gutter", Ambrose, who has been meek through the entire film, finally has had enough. He knocks Claude unconscious, and frightens his wife and mother-in-law into hiding. He and his daughter leave the house to go live elsewhere.

Peabody has fired Ambrose, but Malloy demands that Peabody rehire him because no one else can figure out Wolfinger's filing system. Hope answers the telephone call from Peabody, and says (falsely) that Ambrose has a better offer from another company. After some bargaining, Ambrose is rehired with a huge raise in pay and four weeks' vacation. Meanwhile, Leona realizes that she still loves Ambrose, scolds Claude for his laziness, and stands up to her disagreeable mother.

The film ends with Ambrose taking the family for a ride in his new car. Hope and Leona ride inside the car with him, while Claude and Cordelia ride in the open rumble seat during a heavy rain.

== Cast ==
- W. C. Fields as Ambrose Wolfinger
- Kathleen Howard as Leona Wolfinger, his wife
- Mary Brian as Hope Wolfinger, his daughter
- Vera Lewis as Mrs. Cordelia Neselrode, mother-in-law
- Grady Sutton as Claude Neselrode, her son
- Tammany Young as Willie "The Weasel", a burglar
- Walter Brennan as "Legs" Garnett, a burglar
- Lew Kelly as Adolph Berg
- Arthur Aylesworth as Night Court Judge
- Michael Visaroff as Homicidal Maniac In Cell
- Oscar Apfel as Mr. Malloy, President of Company
- Lucien Littlefield as Mr. Peabody, Office Manager
- Carlotta Monti as "Ambrose's Secretary" (Note: Carlotta Monti had been Fields' girlfriend/companion since 1932. The credits do not assign a name to her, but on-screen Fields called her "Carlotta" in an early scene.)
- Patrick H. O'Malley Jr. as Police Officer
- James Flavin as Henry, chauffeur
- Joe Sawyer as Ambulance Driver
- Minerva Urecal as Italian Woman In Ambulance
- Eddy Chandler as Motorcycle Policeman
- Edward Gargan as Patrolman #1
- James Burke as Patrolman #2
- Tor Johnson as Tosoff, the 'Mad Russian', a wrestler
- Harry Ekezian as Hookalakah Meshobbab, a wrestler
- Sam Lufkin as Ticket Taker
- Billy Bletcher as Timekeeper
- George B. French as Clerk
- Rosemary Theby as Helpful Passerby

== Reception ==
Writing for The Spectator, Graham Greene characterized the film as "a slow worthy comedy". The movie's reputation has grown over time. Waxing more enthusiastic than Greene, film critic Danny Peary declared in 1993 that this was nothing less than Fields's best performance. "In contrast to his other roles," Peary wrote, "Fields isn't cantankerous, doesn't bully any imbecilic assistants, swindle anyone, or do a whole lot of bragging... But don't worry, as his nicest guy, Fields is still in peak form." Noting that Ambrose Wolfinger is still "a rebel and nonconformist" despite his kindness, Peary adds, "It's a pleasure to watch Fields stumble through life and emerge, impossibly, unscathed." Peary concludes by awarding Fields his "alternate" 1935 Academy Award for Best Actor: "For playing a marvelous character no other comic could conceive, and making us laugh nonstop for 65 minutes, Fields deserves the Oscar."
