= Sara Sampaio =

Portuguese actress and model (born 1991)

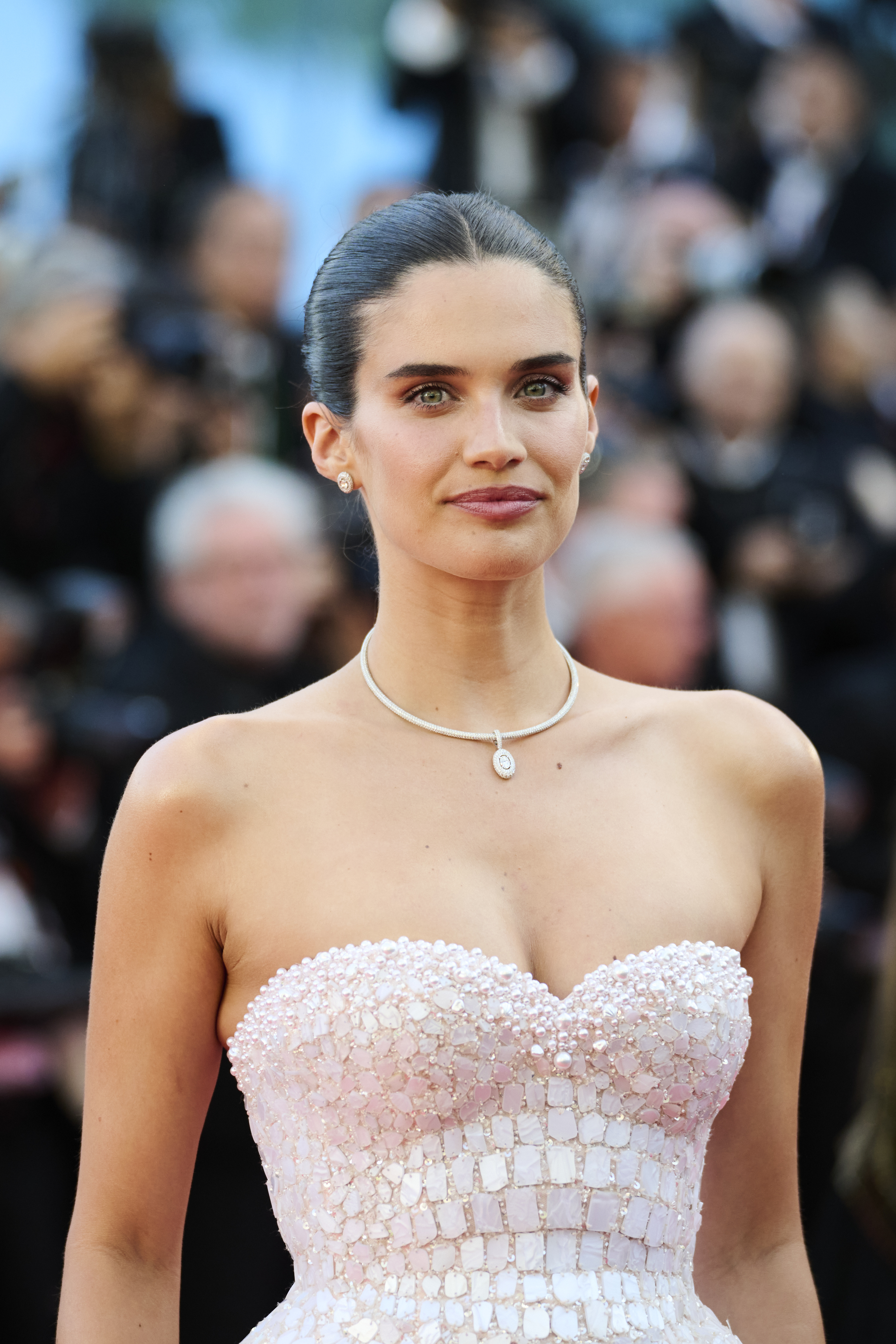
- Sampaio in 2026
- Born: Sara Pinto Sampaio; 21 July 1991 (age 35); Porto, Portugal
- Occupations: Model; actress
- Years active: 2006–present
- Modeling information
- Height: 5 ft 8 in (1.72 m)
- Hair color: Brown
- Eye color: Green
- Agency: The Lions (New York, Los Angeles); Elite Model Management (Paris); Central Models (Lisboa)

Sara Pinto Sampaio (born 21 July 1991) is a Portuguese model and actress, best known for being a Victoria's Secret Angel. She is a Giorgio Armani beauty ambassador and works for Calzedonia.

She was named Best Female Model at the Portuguese Golden Globes (Globos de Ouro) in 2011, 2012, 2014, 2015, and 2016. In 2019, she was the winner of the Globos de Ouro for Fashion Personality of the Year.

== Early life ==
Sampaio grew up on the outskirts of Porto, in northern Portugal. Her father, Armando Sampaio, works for a professional scuba diving company, and her mother, Cristina Sampaio, works for an import company. She has a brother named André.

After completing high school, Sampaio attended the University of Lisbon. She had initially wanted to pursue acting in university, having loved theater classes in school, but her parents convinced her to get a different degree instead.

== Career ==
Sampaio was first discovered at the age of 15, though she was not allowed to compete in modeling competitions until the age of 16. At 16, she won a hair modeling contest in Portugal called Cabelos Pantene 2007. After the contest, she acted in a commercial in Portugal. Afterward, she was signed up with an agency; however, her parents encouraged her to finish high school before becoming a professional model.

Sampaio's dream was to work for Victoria's Secret. After her agency sent in headshots, she was asked to audition. However, she did not make it to the Fashion Show. She continued to pursue the runway and made her debut in the 2013 Victoria's Secret Fashion Show, where she walked in one segment. During her sophomore performance in 2014, she walked in two segments. In 2015, she was chosen as one of the newest Angels for the 2015 runway, and in December of the same year, she walked for the brand for the first time as an Angel. Sara walked with the other Angels in the 2016 Fashion Show in Paris, France.

She has been featured prominently in television ads for Axe body spray in the United States. In 2012, she was chosen for the cover of the April edition of Portuguese Vogue and to be the face of the international advertising campaign for Calzedonia Mar, Summer 2012, which was photographed by Raphael Mazzucco in Greece and Jamaica. She was the face of Calzedonia again in 2013, 2014, and 2015. She also appeared in the Replay Fall/Winter 11/12 campaign, alongside Irina Shayk, in the Blumarine Fall/Winter 11/12 campaign, with Adriana Lima, and in the Armani Fall/Winter 11/12 campaign. In 2013, she appeared in the first edition of the year of the Portuguese GQ, where she was presented as the "eighth wonder of the world". She appeared in Rosa Cha 2013 campaign alongside Barbara Palvin.

On 13 November 2013, she made her debut in the Victoria's Secret Fashion Show 2013. She walked into the Pink segment. She walked the following year in two segments. In 2015, she walked in two segments, for the first year, as an Angel. She has appeared in the 2014 and 2015 editions of the Sports Illustrated Swimsuit edition and won the "Rookie of the year" award in 2014. Sampaio has been on the cover of L'Officiel, Vogue, Marie Claire, Glamour, Elle, Harper's Bazaar, GQ, Telva, etc. In 2015, Maxim honored the 20th anniversary of the brand Victoria's Secret and included Sampaio on the list of "The 20 Most Beautiful Angels of All time". In May, she got her first cover in the United States, photographed by Gilles Bensimon for Maxim.

In 2018, Sampaio moved to Los Angeles to pursue acting, having wanted to perform since childhood but set it aside for her modeling career. She focused on acting classes during the COVID-19 lockdowns. In November 2023, Sampaio was cast as Eve Teschmacher in the DC Studios film Superman, which premiered in July 2025.

== Personal life ==
In a 2015 interview with Vogue, Sampaio discussed being photographed nude, which she said she found empowering, and her view of modeling more generally as a form of artistic expression. In the interview, she says "At the end of the day, we were born naked, and that's the way we are gonna go". However, in October 2017 she accused Lui magazine of sexual harassment and bullying her into posing nude for their cover when she requested that her contract stipulate a no-nudity clause. Sampaio has also spoken out against body-shaming stating that "everybody is different and every metabolism is different". The model was part of Victoria’s Secret’s "A Body for Everybody" campaign.

=== Health ===
Sampaio has stated on Instagram that she has trichotillomania. She was praised by fans and the media for raising awareness of the little-known condition and has received many messages of support from fellow sufferers.

=== Relationships ===
She was in a relationship with entrepreneur Oliver Ripley from 2015 to 2020. From April 2022 to early 2023, she was in a relationship with American producer Zac Frognowski. From July 2023 to December 2025, she was in a relationship with Ray Nicholson, son of actor Jack Nicholson.

== Filmography ==
=== Film ===
Key
†	Denotes films that have not yet been released

Year	Title	Role	Notes
2017	The Clapper	Herself	
2018	Carga	Anna	
2021	Crisis	Inez	
2021	Sombra	Marta	
2022	Wifelike	Wendy	
2023	At Midnight	Elisabetta	
2024	Silence	Maggie	Short film
2025	Superman	Eve Teschmacher	
2025	Billy Knight	Gia	
2027	Man of Tomorrow †	Eve Teschmacher	Post-production

=== Television ===
Year	Title	Role	Notes
2016	Victoria's Secret Swim Special	Herself	Season 2
2017	Billions	Prianca	Episode: "Optimal Play"
2019	Celebrity Family Feud	Herself	Episode: "Victoria’s Secret Angels vs. Bachelor Men and Gaten Matarazzo vs. Maddie & Mackenzie Ziegler"
2022	Shadow - A Mother Knows	Marta	

=== Music videos ===
Year	Title	Artist
2015	"Hands to Myself" (Victoria's Secret version)	Selena Gomez
2016	"Chainsaw"	Nick Jonas
2016	"Wolves" (Balmain Campaign version)	Kanye West
2016	"Body Moves" (Victoria's Secret version)	DNCE
2017	"2U"	David Guetta featuring Justin Bieber
2026	“Mr Charm”	The Rolling Stones

== Awards ==
- First place, Cabelos Pantene Contest 2007
- Best Female Model, Portuguese Golden Globes 2011
- Best Female Model, Vogue Portugal Fashion Awards 2011
- Best Female Model, Portuguese Golden Globes 2012
- Best Female Model, Vogue Portugal Fashion Awards 2012
- 2013 Revelation Model of the Year by ¡Hola! magazine
- Best Female Model, Portuguese Golden Globes 2014
- 2014 Rookie of the Year, Sports Illustrated Swimsuit Issue
- Best Female Model, Portuguese Golden Globes 2015
- Best Female Model, Portuguese Golden Globes 2016
- Fashion Personality of the Year, Portuguese Golden Globes 2019
