= Eve Teschmacher =

DC Comics character

- DC Entertainment character
- First appearance: Superman (1978)
- Created by: Richard Donner; Mario Puzo
- Portrayed by: Valerie Perrine (Superman and Superman II); Cassidy Freeman (Smallville); Andrea Brooks (Supergirl); Sara Sampaio (Superman)

In-universe information
- Full name: Eve Teschmacher
- Species: Human
- Gender: Female
- Title: Miss Teschmacher
- Family: Original Unnamed mother Smallville; Lachlan Luthor (paternal grandfather; deceased); Eliza Luthor (paternal grandmother; deceased); Lionel Luthor (biological father; deceased); Pamela Jenkins (biological mother; deceased); Lex Luthor (half-brother); Julian Luthor (half-brother; deceased); Lucas Luthor (half-brother) Arrowverse Unnamed father DCU Unnamed mother
- Significant other: Lex Luthor

Eve Teschmacher is a character created by Richard Donner and Mario Puzo for Superman: The Movie (1978). She is the personal assistant and love interest of Superman's archenemy, Lex Luthor. In the 1978 film and Superman II, the character was portrayed by Valerie Perrine.

Teschmacher has subsequently made further appearances in film, television, and comics, including the television series Supergirl, portrayed by Andrea Brooks.The character appears in the DC Universe franchise portrayed by Sara Sampaio in the film Superman (2025), and will return in Man of Tomorrow (2027).

== Film ==
=== Superman (1978) and Superman II ===
Created by Richard Donner and Mario Puzo for Superman, Miss Teschmacher, portrayed by Valerie Perrine, is one of Lex Luthor's two main assistants, alongside the bumbling Otis. She operates from Luthor's subterranean lair beneath Grand Central Terminal, aiding Luthor in his plan to destroy the West Coast of the United States using hijacked nuclear missiles in order to increase the value of his desert land holdings. Despite her complicity, she shows reluctance when Luthor reveals he is willing to let millions die—including her mother who lives in Hackensack, New Jersey. After Superman is weakened by kryptonite and left to die, Teschmacher, disturbed by Luthor's cruelty and attracted to Superman, removes the kryptonite and rescues him, on the condition that he first intercepts the missile headed toward Hackensack.

In Superman II, she reappears as Luthor escapes from prison and infiltrates the Fortress of Solitude. Although her role is reduced, she continues to show dissatisfaction with Luthor's obsession with power and his disregard for human life. She ultimately abandons Luthor after he allies with General Zod and betrays her trust.

=== Superman (2025) ===
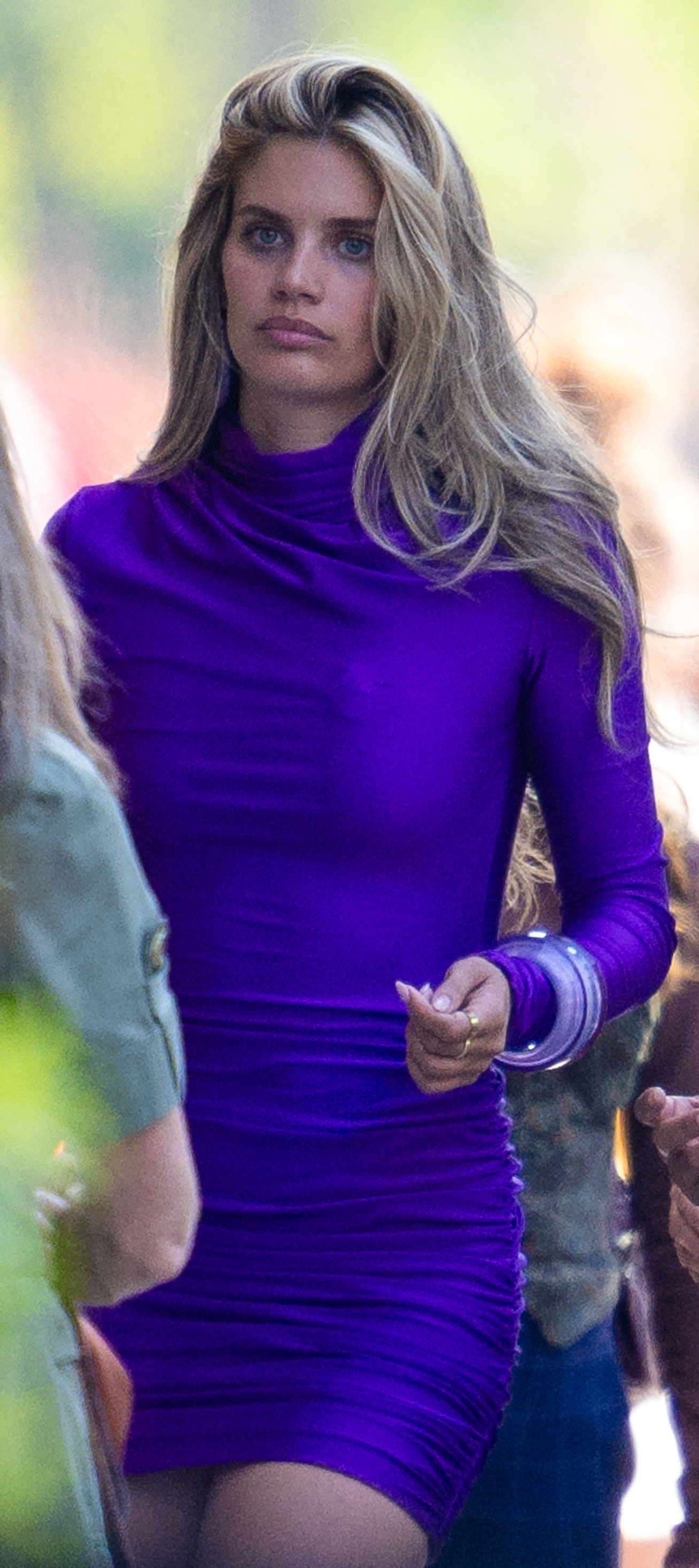
Sara Sampaio as Teschmacher in the 2025 film Superman

Eve Teschmacher appears in Superman (2025), portrayed by Sara Sampaio. This version is Lex Luthor's girlfriend who previously dated Jimmy Olsen, who she still stays in contact with. Having grown disillusioned with Luthor's plan to defame Superman and take over the country of Jarhanpur, she sends Jimmy a collection of selfies that contain incriminating information against Luthor in the background. Luthor finds out about her correspondence with Jimmy (though not realizing the hidden in plain sight background documents), and imprisons her in an artificial pocket universe, while Jimmy's friend Lois Lane releases the images on the Daily Planet's website. After Luthor is arrested and his plans are thwarted by Superman and the Justice Gang, Eve is freed from the pocket universe and resumes her relationship with Jimmy.

== Comics ==
Eve Teschmacher appears in JLA: Earth 2 and Superman Family Adventures as Lex Luthor's secretary.

Teschmacher appears in the film tie-in Superman Returns: Prequel Comic #3.

Eve Teschmacher appears in the DC Rebirth comic Superman's Pal Jimmy Olsen.

== Television ==
- Tess Mercer, a composite character based on Eve Teschmacher, Mercy Graves, and Lena Luthor, appears in Smallville, portrayed by Cassidy Freeman. She is introduced after Lex Luthor's disappearance and is appointed CEO of LuthorCorp. Tess is responsible for executing Lex's remaining plans, managing his covert operations, and protecting his legacy. She conceals his involvement in illegal experiments, including those related to the cloning of Lex. Tess operates as Lex's proxy, delivering messages, enforcing threats, and negotiating with Clark Kent and Oliver Queen. She infiltrates the Veritas society, attempts to control alien technology, and works with the Checkmate organization. Though she begins as a loyal operative, she gradually resists Lex's influence, questions his methods, and pursues her own objectives. Her shifting loyalties place her in direct conflict with both Lex and his enemies, leading to her eventual betrayal and death at Lex's hands.
- Eve Teschmacher (Andrea Brooks) appears in Supergirl as media executive Cat Grant's and later CEO James Olsen's assistant. Teschmacher also serves as assistant to corporate scientist Lena Luthor when Lena conducts research on Black Kryptonite at L-Corp and later the DEO to produce superhuman abilities in humans. Teschmacher is later discovered to be a mole sent by Lex Luthor. After Lex is killed, Teschmacher tries to flee but is coerced into working for covert organization Leviathan as their assassin after her father is killed. Lena captures her and uploads the artificial intelligence Hope into her brain, enabling Hope to control Teschmacher's body. After an attempt to use a weapon satellite, Hope in Teschmacher's body takes the blame and Teschmacher is arrested by the FBI. Lex, now returned to life, persuades her to work as his mole while providing protection for her mother and offering to identify who killed her father. Teschmacher serves as Lex's accomplice, and is tricked into killing former DEO agent Jeremiah Danvers, who Lex claims killed her father. Lex later reveals his lie and blackmails her with the footage. Teschmacher is followed by investigative journalist William Dey but Teschmacher captures and wounds him. Teschmacher is subdued by Lena and Supergirl learns that Lex manipulated Teschmacher and sympathizes with her. Teschmacher's testimony at Lex's trial is discarded due to her emotional involvement with him.

== Analysis ==
Teschmacher has been subject to academic analysis, including the interpretation that her first name functions as a reference to the biblical Eve, reinforcing her thematic role as a morally ambivalent woman influencing powerful men.
