= American Night =

- Poster
- Directed by: Alessio Della Valle
- Written by: Alessio Della Valle
- Produced by: Martha Capello
- Starring: Jonathan Rhys Meyers; Emile Hirsch; Paz Vega; Jeremy Piven; Michael Madsen
- Cinematography: Ben Nott
- Edited by: Zach Staenberg
- Music by: Marco Beltrami
- Production companies: Martha Production; QMI; Rai Cinema
- Distributed by: Lionsgate (Italy/Worldwide); Saban Films (U.S.)
- Release dates: 9 September 2021 (Venice); 1 October 2021 (United States); 19 May 2022 (Italy)
- Running time: 123 minutes
- Countries: Italy; United States
- Language: English

American Night is a 2021 neo-noir film written and directed by Alessio Della Valle, in his directorial debut. It stars Jonathan Rhys Meyers, Emile Hirsch, Jeremy Piven, Paz Vega and Michael Madsen.

== Plot ==
Andy Warhol's famous "Pink Marilyn" painting arrives in New York City, triggering a battle between an art dealer and a mafia boss.

== Cast ==
- Jonathan Rhys Meyers as John Kaplan
- Emile Hirsch as Michael Rubino
- Paz Vega as Sarah Flores
- Jeremy Piven as Vincent
- Fortunato Cerlino as Shakey
- Michael Madsen as Lord Samuel Morgan
- Annabelle Belmondo as Katie
- Mara Lane as Asia
- Lee Levi as Ashley
- Marco Leonardi as Tony Rubino
- Maria Grazia Cucinotta as Donna Maria
- Dimo Alexiev as Harvey
- Phil Ross as Mr Yang
- Manal El-Feitury as DJ
- Marc Fiorini as Jack
- Anastacia as Herself

== Production ==
The film was shot in Sofia, Bulgaria and at Nu Boyana Film Studios. The title song was sung by Anastacia, who also appears in the film.

== Release ==
In August 2021, it was announced that Saban Films acquired North American distribution rights to the film. It premiered at the Venice Film Festival in September 2021 and was released in select theaters in the U.S.

== Reception ==
On the review aggregator website Rotten Tomatoes, 37% of 19 critics' reviews are positive, with an average rating of /10.
