= Night Cargo =

1936 film

- Directed by: Charles Hutchison
- Written by: Sherman L. Lowe
- Produced by: Sam Efrus
- Starring: Lloyd Hughes; Julie Bishop; Walter Miller
- Cinematography: Walter Lundin
- Edited by: Fred Bain
- Production company: Peerless Pictures
- Distributed by: Marcy Pictures
- Release date: January 7, 1936
- Running time: 66 minutes
- Country: United States
- Language: English

Night Cargo is a 1936 American crime drama film directed by Charles Hutchison and starring Lloyd Hughes, Julie Bishop and Walter Miller. It was the final film produced by the low-budget Peerless Pictures studio.

== Plot ==
In Singapore a young American Bruce Donaldson searches for his former fiancee, a showgirl who fled America when his wealthy family refused to consent to the marriage. Bruce gets brief employment with Shark Moran who owns a nearby plantation, unaware that Shark is in love with a dancer in a Singapore bar who is Bruce's old lover using an alias. Things are complicated when Shark is murdered and two smugglers muscle in.

== Cast ==
- Lloyd Hughes as Bruce Donaldson
- Julie Bishop as Claire "Marty" Martineau
- Walter Miller as "Shark" Moran
- Carlotta Monti as Tiana
- Lloyd Whitlock as "Spider" Blake
- George Regas as Gus Noble
- Jimmy Aubrey as Huggins
- John Ince as Boat Captain

== Bibliography ==
- Fetrow, Alan G. . Sound films, 1927-1939: a United States Filmography. McFarland, 1992.
- Pitts, Michael R. Poverty Row Studios, 1929–1940: An Illustrated History of 55 Independent Film Companies, with a Filmography for Each. McFarland & Company, 2005.
