= Book of My Mother =

1954 book by Albert Cohen

- 1978 French edition (publ. Editions folio)
- Author: Albert Cohen
- Original title: Le Livre de ma mère
- Cover artist: Mary Cassatt
- Language: French
- Publisher: Éditions Gallimard
- Publication date: 1954
- Publication place: France
- English publication date: 1997
- Pages: 206

Book of My Mother (French: Le Livre de ma mère) is a 1954 memoir by the Swiss writer Albert Cohen. It focuses on the life of Cohen's mother. It was published in English in 1997.

== Reception ==
The book was reviewed in Publishers Weekly in 1998: "In this intensely public forum, Cohen seems to be coming to grips with his mother's death through all the typical stages of mourning--numbness, denial, anger, guilt--with pen in hand. Although this process is not without its bouts of melodrama ('O Maman, my youth that is no more!'), other outbursts powerfully reflect a disgust with mortality and a baffled sense of abandonment. ... This is a heartbreaking little volume, worth reading twice."

== See also ==
- 1954 in literature
- Swiss literature
