= Nailcruncher =

1938 book by Albert Cohen

- Author: Albert Cohen
- Original title: Mangeclous
- Translator: Vyvyan Holland
- Language: French
- Publisher: Éditions Gallimard
- Publication date: 1938
- Publication place: France
- English publication date: 1940
- Pages: 326

Nailcruncher (French: Mangeclous) is a 1938 novel by the Swiss writer Albert Cohen. It is the second part in a loosely connected series of four; it was preceded by Solal of the Solals, and followed by Belle du Seigneur and Les Valeureux. Nailcruncher was adapted into a 1988 film with the same title, directed by Moshé Mizrahi.

== See also ==
- 1938 in literature
- Swiss literature
