= Damascus Cover =

2017 political thriller film

- Theatrical release poster
- Directed by: Daniel Zelik Berk
- Written by: Daniel Zelk Berk; Samantha Newton
- Produced by: Huw Penallt Jones; Hannah Leader; Jonathan Rhys Meyers; Joe Thomas
- Starring: Jonathan Rhys Meyers; Olivia Thirlby; Jürgen Prochnow; Igal Naor; Navid Negahban; John Hurt
- Cinematography: Chloë Thomson
- Edited by: Martin Brinkler
- Music by: Harry Escott
- Production companies: Xeitgeist Entertainment Group; Marcys Holdings; BBM
- Distributed by: Vertical Entertainment
- Release dates: September 23, 2017 (Boston); July 20, 2018 (United States)
- Running time: 93 minutes
- Countries: United States; United Kingdom
- Box office: $19,532

Damascus Cover is a 2017 political thriller film, directed by Daniel Zelik Berk, from a screenplay by Berk and Samantha Newton. It is based upon the 1977 novel of the same name by Howard Kaplan. It stars Jonathan Rhys Meyers, Olivia Thirlby, Jürgen Prochnow, Igal Naor, Navid Negahban and John Hurt. This was Hurt's final film appearance before his death; the film was dedicated to his memory.

The film had its world premiere at the Boston Film Festival on September 23, 2017. It was released on July 20, 2018, by Vertical Entertainment. The film received negative reviews from critics.

== Plot ==
Ari Ben-Sion (Jonathan Rhys Meyers), an Israeli spy posing as a German businessman named Hans Hoffmann in 1989 Berlin, receives orders to travel to Damascus to help a Jewish family escape Ba'athist Syria. During his mission, he encounters Kim Johnson (Olivia Thirlby), an attractive American photojournalist, and begins a relationship with her. Soon, however, he realizes that the local security services are aware of his true identity as an Israeli spy and are monitoring him closely, leaving him uncertain as to why he hasn’t been eliminated.

As a series of unexpected twists unfold, Ben-Sion discovers that his real mission is to help exfiltrate a senior Israeli agent known only as "The Angel" from Syria. He then learns that the mission’s true aim is to discredit Suleiman Sarraj (Navid Negahban), the ruthless head of the Syrian secret service. Shockingly, Ben-Sion finds out that Kim is, in fact, a spy and assassin working under Sarraj's orders.

Determined to complete his mission, Ben-Sion presses on with The Angel's exfiltration plan, bringing Kim along. She assists him in eliminating several Syrian agents, convincing Ben-Sion that she, like him, has grown weary of deception and violence. However, when they reach the rendezvous point, The Angel, who has long known of Kim's allegiance to the Syrians, is horrified to see her. Just as Syrian forces close in on them, Kim denies alerting them, but The Angel, mistrustful, shoots her dead. Ben-Sion holds off the approaching Syrians, buying time for The Angel to escape, before he is ultimately captured.

In a final twist, it is revealed that General Fuad (Igal Naor), Sarraj's professional rival, is the true Angel. He orchestrated the escape of the 'false' Angel as part of a scheme to ruin Sarraj’s career. After explaining this to Ben-Sion, General Fuad arranged a prisoner exchange, trading Ben-Sion for several Syrians held in Israeli custody.

== Cast ==
- Jonathan Rhys Meyers as Ari Ben-Sion / Hans Hoffmann
- Olivia Thirlby as Kim Johnson
- John Hurt as Miki
- Jürgen Prochnow as Franz Ludin
- Navid Negahban as Suleiman Sarraj
- Wolf Kahler as Colonel Ludwig Streicher
- Igal Naor as General Fuad
- Selva Rasalingam as Sabri
- Neta Riskin as Yael
- Tsahi Halevi as Rami Elon
- Ben Affan as Mustapha
- Herzl Tobey as Ehud
- Aki Avni as Shaul
- Hassani Shapi as Syrian Trade Minister
- Shani Aviv as Rachel

== Production ==
In February 2015, it was announced Jonathan Rhys Meyers, John Hurt, Olivia Thirlby, Igal Naor, Jürgen Prochnow, and Navid Negahban joined the cast of the film, with Daniel Zelik Berk directing from a screenplay he wrote alongside Samantha Newton, from the novel of the same name by Howard Kaplan. Hannah Leader will serve as a producer on the film.

== Release ==
The film had its world premiere at the Boston Film Festival on September 23, 2017. Shortly after, Vertical Entertainment acquired distribution rights to the film. The film was released on July 20, 2018.

== Reception ==
On the review aggregator website Rotten Tomatoes, 14% of 22 critics' reviews are positive, with an average rating of 4.2/10. The website's consensus reads: "Damascus Cover is essentially every bit the hackneyed espionage drama that any veteran of '90s action thrillers might expect after reading its title." Metacritic gives it a weighted average score of 36 out of 100 based on reviews from 8 critics.
