= The Children of Huang Shi =

- US theatrical poster
- 黄石的孩子
- Directed by: Roger Spottiswoode
- Written by: Jane Hawksley; James MacManus
- Produced by: Arthur Cohn; Wieland Schulz-Keil; Jonathon Shteinman
- Starring: Jonathan Rhys Meyers; Radha Mitchell; Chow Yun-fat; Michelle Yeoh; David Wenham
- Cinematography: Zhao Xiaoding
- Edited by: Geoffrey Lamb; Dominique Fortin
- Music by: David Hirschfelder
- Production companies: Screen Australia; Ming Productions; Zero West Filmproduktion; Cheerland Entertainment; Bluewater Pictures
- Distributed by: 20th Century Fox (Australia); Hyde Park Entertainment (International); Concorde Film (Germany); Cheerland Entertainment Corporation (China); Sony Pictures Classics (United States)
- Release date: April 3, 2008
- Running time: 125 minutes
- Countries: Australia; China; Germany
- Languages: English; Chinese; Japanese
- Budget: $40 million
- Box office: $8.2 million

The Children of Huang Shi (Chinese: 黄石的孩子; working title: The Bitter Sea, also known as Escape from Huang Shi and Children of the Silk Road) is a 2008 historical war drama film directed by Roger Spottiswoode, and starring Jonathan Rhys Meyers, Radha Mitchell, Chow Yun-fat, Michelle Yeoh and David Wenham. The film centers on the true story of George Hogg and the sixty orphans that he led across China in an effort to save them from conscription during the Second Sino-Japanese War. The film depicts the Rape of Nanjing and the Japanese "kill all, burn all, loot all" practices.

== Plot ==
George Hogg (Jonathan Rhys-Meyers) is a young British journalist from Hertfordshire. A year after the Japanese invasion and occupation of northern China in 1937, he sneaks into Nanjing by pretending to be a Red Cross aid worker where he photographs the poverty, ruins, and corpses left on the streets. Hogg witnesses Japanese soldiers massacre Chinese refugees and is captured by the Japanese in the act of photographing their atrocities. He is saved from execution by Chen Hansheng (Chow Yun-fat), a Chinese communist resistance fighter. While hiding in the rubble they witness the execution of two resistance fighters and inadvertently reveal their presence. Hogg is wounded in the ensuing firefight. Hogg wakes up in a rebel camp where Lee Pearson (Radha Mitchell) checks his wounds. Hansheng and Lee suggest he rest at an orphanage where 56 boys are cared for by a single aged grandmother. On the night he arrrives, Hogg is lured outside by one of the boys and beaten with sticks by the orphans. Lee rescues him and threatens to cut off aid to the orphanage.

Lee and Hogg convince the boys to permit treatment of their lice with flea powder. Lee leaves Hogg to take care for the boys when she leaves for two months. Hogg tries to refuse, preferring to write about the front lines and spread word about the war, but the sight of the grandmother looking down at him convinces him to stay. Hogg gains the boys' respect by repairing the lighting, cleaning up the orphanage, and teaching them. Hogg travels with one of the boys to bargain for food with a well-known wealthy lady, Mrs. Wang (Michelle Yeoh). He navigates around her cash only policy by promising to provide her with fresh vegetables in exchange for food and seeds, and passing her tests of his agricultural knowledge. With the help of one of hte orphans, he cultivates a flourishing vegetable garden along with tall stalks of sunflowers.

The boys are forced to flee from the Nationalists who want to conscript them into the army to fight the Japanese. They make a three-month journey across the snow-bound Liu Pan Shan mountains to safety on the edge of the Mongolian desert, the first 900 km on foot. They travel the last leg of the journey on four trucks, and move into a new orphanage. Hogg dies of tetanus in 1945. The film ends with snippets of interviews with surviving orphans.

== Cast ==
- Jonathan Rhys Meyers as George Hogg
- Radha Mitchell as Lee Pearson
- Chow Yun-fat as Chen Hansheng
- Michelle Yeoh as Mrs. Wang
- Guang Li as Shi-Kai
- Lin Ji as Horse Rider
- Matt Walker as Andy Fisher
- Anastasia Kolpakova as Duschka
- Ping Su as Eddie Wei
- David Wenham as Barnes

== Critical reception ==
The film received mixed reviews from Western critics. On the review aggregator website Rotten Tomatoes, 30% of 77 critics' reviews are positive, with an average rating of 4.7/10. The website's consensus reads: "This beautifully photographed but dramatically flat war drama recounts an important chapter in history with little cinematic freshness." Metacritic reported the film had an average score of 49 out of 100, based on 22 reviews. The New York Times gave the film an overall positive review, praising the acting and its "realistic depiction of war-ravaged China".

The film has been criticized for ignoring the role of Rewi Alley, a Communist New Zealander celebrated in China's revolution. Conversion of the nurse played by Radha Mitchell from a New Zealander (Kathleen Hall, associated with Alley) to an American also received negative attention. The omission of Alley in particular has been called a blatant misrepresentation by Paul Byrnes of The Sydney Morning Herald.

=== Awards and nominations ===
- AACTA Award for Best Production Design: Steven Jones-Evans (Nomination)
- AACTA Award for Best Costume Design: Kym Barrett & Wenyan Gao (Nomination)
- Australian Screen Music Award for Feature Film Scores: David Hirschfelder (Won)
- Young Artist Award for Best Performance in an International Feature Film - Leading Young Performers: Guang Li (Nomination)

== Box office performance ==
The film grossed around $7.4 million worldwide, including $1.6 million in China and Spain, and $1 million in the U.S. and Australia.

== Film and history ==
The film's original writer, James MacManus, said "His entry to China was February 1938. He did not go to Nanjing. The movie has been dramatized. It's not the fact." Hogg wrote travel writings. But articles that he saw atrocities have not been found in the archives of Associated Press and United Press International.
