= Hide and Seek (2021 film) =

American horror film

- Release poster
- Directed by: Joel David Moore
- Screenplay by: Joel David Moore
- Based on: Hide and Seek by Huh Jung
- Produced by: Joel David Moore; Yeonu Choi
- Starring: Jonathan Rhys Meyers; Jacinda Barrett; Joe Pantoliano; Mustafa Shakir
- Production company: CJ Entertainment
- Distributed by: Saban Films
- Release date: November 19, 2021
- Running time: 83 minutes
- Country: United States
- Language: English

Hide and Seek is a 2021 American horror-thriller film written and directed by Joel David Moore. It is a remake of the 2013 Korean film of the same name. The film stars Jonathan Rhys Meyers, Jacinda Barrett, Joe Pantoliano and Mustafa Shakir. It premiered theatrically and on video on demand platforms on November 19, 2021.

== Cast ==
- Jonathan Rhys Meyers as Noah Blackwell
- Jacinda Barrett as Samantha Blackwell
- Joe Pantoliano as Collin Carmichael
- Mustafa Shakir as Frankie Pascarillo
- Quinn McColgan as Hannah Blackwell

== Production ==
On December 13, 2017, was announced that an English remake of the Korean film of the same name would be adapted and directed by Moore. Saban Films acquired North American, UK and Irish rights in the spring of 2021 giving the film a limited theatrical release in the U.S. in November 2021.

== Reception ==
Common Sense Media rated the film 2 out of 5 stars. The film has a 13% rating on Rotten Tomatoes based on 8 reviews.
