= Carlotta Monti =

American actress

- Born: Carlotta Montijo; January 25, 1907; Los Angeles, California, U.S.
- Died: December 8, 1993 (aged 86); Woodland Hills, Los Angeles, California, U.S.
- Occupation: Actress
- Years active: 1925–1976
- Partner: W.C. Fields (1933-1946; his death)

Carlotta Monti (January 25, 1907 – December 8, 1993) was an American film actress, who was W. C. Fields' companion in his last years.

Born Carlotta Montijo in Los Angeles, Monti appeared in B-movies and uncredited bit parts, including Kiss of Araby (1933), Tarzan the Fearless (1933) and Night Cargo (1936). She met Fields in 1932, and their relationship lasted until his death in 1946. She had small roles in his films Man on the Flying Trapeze (1935) and Never Give a Sucker an Even Break (1941).

Monti died of complications from Alzheimer's disease in December, 1993 at the age of 86.

== Memoir ==
Monti's best-selling memoir W. C. Fields & Me, published in 1971, described her life and experiences with Fields. It was adapted for the 1976 film W.C. Fields and Me, starring Valerie Perrine as Monti and Rod Steiger as Fields. Monti appeared in the film as an extra.

== Writings ==
- with Cy Rice. W. C. Fields & Me. Englewood Cliffs, New Jersey: Prentice-Hall, 1971. ISBN 978-0-13-944454-8

== Selected filmography ==
- Night Cargo (1936)
