= George Hogg (adventurer) =

British adventurer

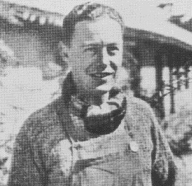
- Born: George Aylwin Hogg; 26 January 1915; United Kingdom
- Died: 22 July 1945 (aged 30); Shandan, Gansu, China
- Resting place: Shandan, Gansu, China
- Education: University of Oxford
- Known for: Shandan Bailie School

George Aylwin Hogg (Chinese: 何克; pinyin: Hé Kè; Wade–Giles: Ho^{2} K'o^{4}, 26 January 1915 – 22 July 1945) was a British adventurer. He studied economics at University of Oxford and was best known for saving 60 orphaned boys during the Second Sino-Japanese War and leading them 700 miles (1,100 km) through dangerous mountain passes, escaping the approaching Japanese and Chinese Nationalist forces in the Shaanxi area.

== Early life ==
George Aylwin Hogg was the son of Robert Hogg a merchant tailor from Belfast, Co. Antrim & his wife Kathleen née Lester. Hogg grew up in the small town of Harpenden in the United Kingdom. He attended St George's School, Harpenden, where he was head boy. Afterwards, he went to Wadham College in Oxford, studied economics, obtaining a degree of Bachelor of Arts. He then became a freelance journalist for the Manchester Guardian.

In 1937 he sailed on the Queen Mary to New York City, hitchhiked across the United States, and joined his aunt Muriel Lester (a well-known English pacifist and friend of Mahatma Gandhi). They continued their trip to Japan.

== Life in China ==
In January 1938, during the undeclared war between China and Japan, he left Japan to visit Shanghai, China for two days. He helped Kathleen Hall, a nurse from New Zealand, smuggle food and medicine to the communists. During this, he witnessed first hand the brutality of the Imperial Japanese Army towards the Chinese and chose to stay in China. In Shaanxi Province, Hogg befriended communist General Nie Rongzhen and participated with the Eighth Route Army in guerrilla raids against the Japanese. While on the front lines, he wrote the book "I See a New China".

There have been claims that Hogg was an independent reporter for the Associated Press, supposedly writing on the atrocities which he witnessed during the war. However, these are unsubstantiated and there are no articles authored by him in either the archives of Associated Press and United Press International.

=== Shandan Bailie School ===
Hogg started to assist the Gung Ho movement operated by New Zealand-born communist Rewi Alley in Shaanxi. He helped Alley operate a lice-infested facility (without books, beds or food) for 60 orphaned boys. He converted a nearby cottage into a dormitory. With credit established in town, he was able to supply millet and vegetables to the children. Funds for the facility came from the Chinese Industrial Cooperatives (CIC), also organised by Alley. CIC regional headquarters in Baoji was 60 miles (97 km) over the Qinling Mountain pass. Hogg occasionally traveled by bicycle to CIC.

The boys called him Ho Ke. To get respect and control over the boys, Hogg participated in many activities with them, including singing, swimming, sports and hiking. The children tended a vegetable garden for food and Hogg made a basketball court for recreation. He personally adopted four boys (brothers Nie Guangchun, Nie Guanghan, Nie Guangtao and Nie Guangpei).

In late 1944, the Nationalist army searched classrooms for boys to recruit. The army arrested Hogg for resisting recruitment.

=== Relocation ===
Hogg then decided to relocate the boys to Shandan in Gansu Province 700 miles (1,100 km) away. The first 33 left in November 1944, and the remaining 27 boys followed in January 1945. They travelled heavily snow-covered mountain roads by foot. After a month of walking, 450 miles (720 km), they arrived in Lanzhou. Hogg hired six diesel trucks to complete the trip.

In early March 1945, Hogg and his boys arrived in Shandan. Alley rented some old temples, turned them into classrooms and workshops, and appointed Hogg as headmaster. From the beginning, the school was aided by a group of friendly New Zealanders who later formed the New Zealand China Friendship Society.

== Death ==
In July 1945, Hogg stubbed his toe while playing basketball with the boys. It became infected with tetanus and two boys went to Lanzhou by motorcycle, a 500-mile round trip to get medicine. To comfort Hogg until he died, the boys sang nursery rhymes he had taught them.

He died on 22 July after three days. He was laid to rest outside town. His headstone is engraved with lines from his favourite poem.

He never saw the end of the Sino-Japanese War with the surrender of Japan just one month after his death.

== In popular culture ==
Hogg's life is dramatised in the film The Children of Huang Shi (2008), also called Children of the Silk Road or Escape from Huang Shi, starring Jonathan Rhys Meyers as Hogg and Chow Yun-fat as a Chinese communist resistance fighter Chen Hansheng. Writer James Macmanus has emphasised that the events in the film are fictionalised, with some events, such as his entry into Nanjing being constructed for dramatic effect.

His life is chronicled in Ocean Devil: The Life and Legend of George Hogg by James MacManus. His own account is George Aylwin Hogg, I See a New China, which includes his participation in the Chinese Industrial Cooperatives project in rural industrialization.

== Books ==
- Blades of Grass - The Story of George Aylwin Hogg by Mark Aylwin Thomas, ISBN 978-1524676971
- I See a New China by George Hogg, ISBN 0-7089-1503-5
- Ocean Devil: The Life and Legend of George Hogg by James MacManus, ISBN 0-00-727075-5
- Fruition: The story of George Alwin Hogg by Rewi Alley,
