= Selva Rasalingam =

British film actor (born 1968)

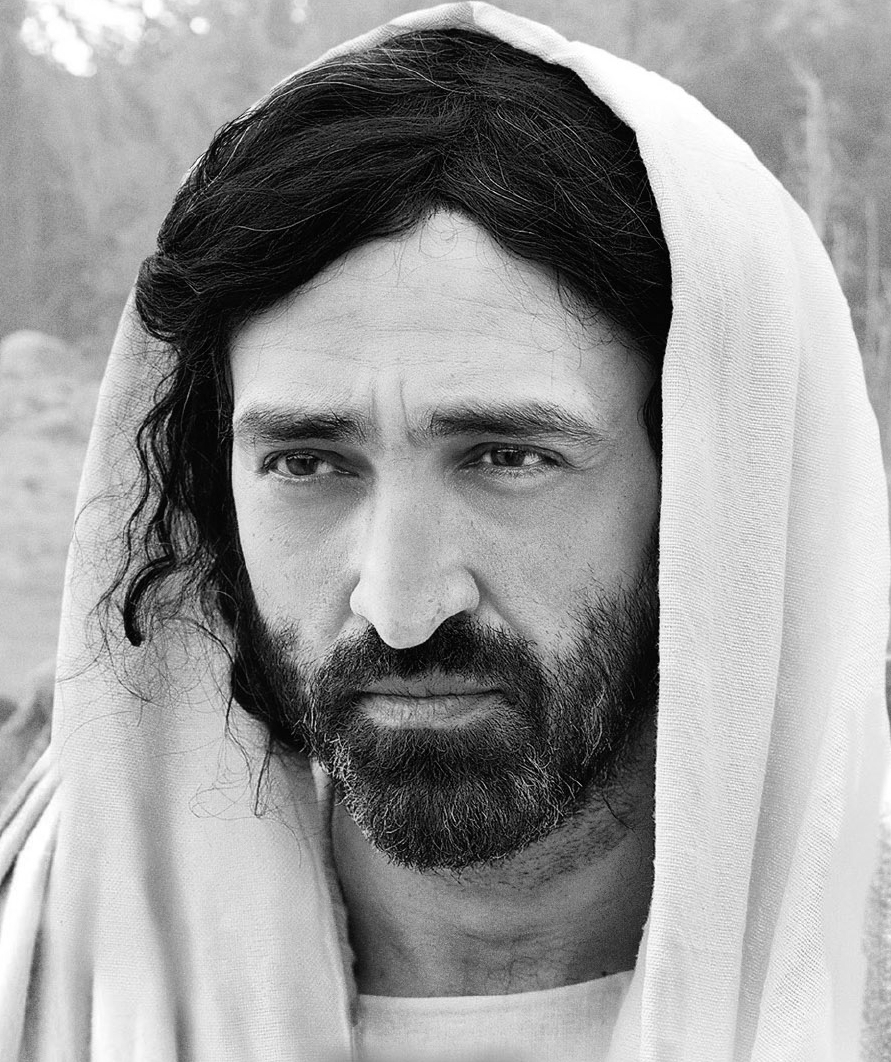
- Selva Rasalingam as Jesus in The Gospel of Luke (2016)
- Born: October 15, 1968 (age 58); Tottenham, London, England, U.K.
- Education: Guildhall School of Music and Drama
- Occupation: Actor
- Years active: 1991–present

Selva Rasalingam (born in 15 October 1968) is a British actor. He has appeared on stage in London's West End and the Royal Shakespeare Company, on television in Marie-Antoinette, Doctor Who, Luther and Hustle, and film in Damascus Cover, Prince of Persia: The Sands of Time and Skyfall, on which he was a member of the stunts cast. He played the role of Jesus in the 2014 version of The Gospel of John.

== Life ==
Rasalingam was born in Tottenham in North London to a Tamil father and English mother. He trained at the Guildhall School of Music and Drama (1988–91), London.

== Career ==
Rasalingam portrayed Jesus in The Gospel of John and the other three Gospels produced by the Lumo Project, which was well received as dramatisation and academically for its Biblically accurate depiction. He studied diverse historical and academic sources in preparation for the role, and filming spanned five years.

Other stage appearances include An Adventure by Vinay Patel (The Bush Theatre) Guantanamo: Honor Bound to Defend Freedom in the West End, the award-winning The Riots (Tricycle Theatre), and Amir in Pulitzer-Prize winning play Disgraced (The English Theatre Frankfurt).

== Performances ==
=== Filmography ===
- The Way of the Wind (film, release TBA)
- Damascus Cover (2018 film)
- The Intent 2: The Come Up (2018 film)
- Profile (2018 film)
- The Mummy (2017 film)
- The Gospel of Matthew (2016 film)
- The Gospel of Mark (2016 film)
- The Gospel of Luke (2016 film)
- Risen (2016 film)
- The Gospel of John (2014 film)
- Skyfall (2012 film)
- The Veteran (2011 film)
- The Devil's Double (2011 film)
- Prince of Persia: The Sands of Time (2010 film)
- Man About Dog (2005 film)

=== Television ===
- Marie-Antoinette (2025 TV series) Canal+ / Banijay Studios France / CAPA Drama / BBC / PBS
- Renegade Nell (2024 TV series) Disney+ / Lookout Point
- Bodies (2023 TV series) Netflix
- Cœurs noirs (2022 TV series) France Télévisions / Mandarin Télévision / Prime Video
- D'argent et du sang (2022 TV series) Curiosa Films / Canal+
- Ten Percent (2022 TV series) (2022 Amazon Prime Video)
- The Good Karma Hospital (2022 ITV)
- Doc Martin (2022 TV series) Buffalo Pictures / ITV
- Honour (2020 ITV)
- Cursed (2020 Netflix)
- Doctors (2019 BBC)
- Versailles (2018 BBC / Canal+)
- Eastenders (2018 BBC)
- Strike Back: Retribution (2018 Left Bank Pictures / Cinemax / Sky)
- Silent Witness - series 21 (2018 BBC), as Asst. Commissioner Khan
- The Missing - series II (2016 BBC)
- Luther - series III (2013 BBC)
- Run (2012 Acme Films for Channel 4)
- Doctor Who (2012 BBC)
- Hustle (TV series) VII, final episode (2012 Kudos Film and Television / BBC)
- The Borgias (2011 TV series), (Showtime / Sky Atlantic)
- Londyńczycy (2008 TVP1)
- Waking the Dead, (2008 BBC)
- Spooks, (2007 Kudos Film and Television / BBC)

=== Theatre ===
- An Adventure, Bush Theatre, 2018
- The Captive Queen, Sam Wanamaker Playhouse / Shakespeare's Globe, 2018
- Disgraced, The English Theatre Frankfurt, 2016
- The Nightmares of Carlos Fuentes, Arcola Theatre, 2014
- The Riots, Tricycle Theatre, 2012
- On the Record, Arcola Theatre, 2011
- Guantanamo: Honor Bound to Defend Freedom, Ambassadors Theatre, 2004
- Midnight's Children, Royal Shakespeare Company, 2003

=== Radio ===
- Fall of the Shah, BBC Radio Drama, 2019
- The Bethlehem Murders, BBC Radio 4 Drama, 2018
- Tommies: 11 November 1917 (S8E2), BBC Radio 4 Drama, 2017
- Tommies: 10 November 1917 (S8E1), BBC Radio 4 Drama, 2017
- Midnight's Children, BBC Radio 4 Drama, 2017
- Tommies: 2 December 1916 (S5E4), BBC Radio 4 Drama, 2016

=== Other ===
- Final Fantasy XVI, Square Enix Company, 2023
- Baldur's Gate 3, Larian Studios, 2023
- Watch Dogs: Legion, Ubisoft, 2020
