= Wifelike =

2022 American science fiction film

- Directed by: James Bird
- Written by: James Bird
- Starring: Jonathan Rhys Meyers; Elena Kampouris
- Release date: August 12, 2022
- Running time: 105 minutes
- Country: United States
- Language: English

Wifelike is a 2022 American science fiction thriller film written and directed by James Bird and starring Jonathan Rhys Meyers and Elena Kampouris.

== Plot ==
In the future, the company "Wifelike" creates expensive android replicas of dead women for their widowers. The companions are subservient to their respective owners while gradually developing consciousness. S.C.A.I.R., a group of militant activists, seek to destroy the company for their AI exploitation, seeing the companions as slaves. A branch of their group is committing terrorist acts to accomplish their mission; these supposedly involve stealing robots from their owners, reprogramming them, and using them to perform various crimes, including bombing buildings. The police cannot locate their leader, nicknamed "the Ringmaster".

Seasoned agent William Bradwell works in finding stolen androids and returning them home. He orders one made to resemble his deceased love, Meredith. Once activated, the companion starts learning about Meredith to become more like her. According to William, Meredith used to be a S.C.A.I.R activist, until she fell in love with him, abandoned her cause, and married him. This is not the first time that William has gone through this process; previous iterations of his Meredith replica have already been stolen by S.C.A.I.R. and recovered by him, with her memory of the experience being wiped every time.

While becoming more like Meredith, William's companion starts dreaming about a masked man who claims to know her from before the last memory wipe. She also starts receiving visits from Louise, a member of S.C.A.I.R. who seems to have talked to the companion's previous iterations. Meanwhile, William discovers that some companions have voluntarily joined S.C.A.I.R. to escape their owners. One of them kills herself after William finds her, not wanting to lose her memory and return to her subservient life.

After learning of his companions' dreams, William convinces his partner, Jack Doerksen, to help him get into the "dreamscape" that manages the companions and their thoughts to arrest the masked man, who claims to be the Ringleader. The two have a physical confrontation, but the companion disconnects him from the Dreamscape before he can strangle the Ringleader to death. Furious, William storms out of the room, refusing to explain to Jack why he lied to him about his intentions.

William takes his companion to Wifelike to have her memory wiped again. Before being submitted to the procedure, the companion talks to other androids; most of them seem to be members of S.C.A.I.R. and recognize her as one of their own. According to them, she has hidden memories in her hard-drive and can access them even after they reboot her. She has been maintaining her role as William's companion in the hopes of learning something important. After her memory is wiped again, the companion fools William into believing that she does not remember anything from the night before.

Jack's girlfriend is visited by Louise, who delivers proof that the man who they have identified as the Ringleader, Keene Morrison, has been dead for a long time and only exists in the hard drive of William's companion. Jack confronts William with this information. William admits that he killed Keene, who was Meredith's actual boyfriend, and forced Meredith to live with him as he was in love with her. Their abusive relationship ended with William smothering her with a pillow and putting an engagement ring on her dead body so he could have her remade as an android by Wifelike.

Having been caught, William kills Jack. The companion reveals that William has been manipulated from the start, with Louise using a mask and voice changer to impersonate Keene and reveal his true character to Jack; she now has proof that he also murdered the real Keene and stole the ring he planned to give to Meredith. The companion overrides her safety protocols, kills William, and returns to her S.C.A.I.R. base, where she meets with other free companions. She is the actual Ringmaster, and decides to take the next step in the coming revolution.

The founder of Wifelike puts out a public message announcing that his company is prepared to take a more active role in the fight against S.C.A.I.R. and the rogue companions. He reveals that William, now an android himself, will be in charge of this new effort.

== Cast ==
- Jonathan Rhys Meyers as William Bradwell
- Elena Kampouris as Meredith
- Doron Bell as Agent Jack Doerksen
- Agam Darshi as Louise
- Sara Sampaio as Wendy
- Alix Villaret as Lydie
- Fletcher Donovan as Keene Morrison
- CJ Perry as Holly
- Stephen Lobo as Marion Venner

== Release ==
The film was released in select theaters, on demand and on digital on August 12, 2022. As of December 2023 it is available on Netflix.

== Reception ==
The film has a 13% rating on Rotten Tomatoes based on eight reviews.
