= Solal of the Solals =

1930 book by Albert Cohen

- Title page for Solal (1933)
- Author: Albert Cohen
- Translator: Wilfrid Benson
- Language: French
- Publisher: Éditions Gallimard
- Publication date: 1930
- Publication place: France
- English publication date: 1933
- Pages: 350

Solal of the Solals (French: Solal) is a 1930 novel by the Swiss writer Albert Cohen. It was published in English in 1933. It was Cohen's first novel, and the first part in a loosely connected series of four; it was followed by Nailcruncher, Belle du Seigneur and Les Valeureux.

== Reception ==
The book was reviewed in Time in 1933: "Publishers, like other advertisers, cry 'Wolf! Wolf!' to a semi-attentive public. ... Consequently, in those blue moons when they have something to shout about, a sharp-toothed masterpiece may slip undetected into the gentle reader's fold, cause much silent havoc before the alarm is given. Though Publisher Dutton has sounded no extra-special warning, Solal is such a masterpiece-in-sheep's-clothing. Wolf would be a misnomer: nothing so leonine has come down the pike in many a blue moon."

== See also ==
- 1930 in literature
- Swiss literature
