= A Therapy =

- Official poster
- Directed by: Roman Polanski
- Written by: Roman Polanski; Ronald Harwood
- Produced by: Hi! Production; R.P. Productions
- Starring: Helena Bonham Carter; Ben Kingsley
- Cinematography: Eduardo Serra
- Edited by: Hervé de Luze
- Music by: Alexandre Desplat
- Distributed by: Prada
- Release date: 22 May 2012
- Running time: 4 minutes
- Country: France
- Language: English

A Therapy is a 2012 comedy short film created by Prada to promote their brand. The short was written and directed by Roman Polanski and stars Ben Kingsley and Helena Bonham Carter.

== Premise ==
A female patient walks into a therapist's office, dressed head to toe in Prada design. She lies down on the couch and begins to talk about her problems, completely unaware of the therapist's growing obsession with her fur coat.

== Cast ==
- Ben Kingsley as Therapist
- Helena Bonham Carter as Patient

== Reception ==
The short was shown at the Cannes Film Festival and received strong applause and praise from the audience there, as part of the Cannes Classic section. The short film was later released on Prada's official website.

== Filming ==
The short was filmed in Paris, France and director Roman Polanski had the following to say about the experience:

"A game, a thought, that through friendship and mutual respect has become true. When I was asked to shoot a short movie for Prada, I did not think that I could really be myself, but the reality is that in the total freedom I was given, I had the opportunity to reunite my favorite group of people on set and just have fun.

The chance to dwell on what the fashion world represents nowadays and the fact that it is accompanied by so many stereotypes is fascinating and at the same time a bit upsetting, but you definitely can not ignore it.

It's very refreshing to know that there are still places open to irony and wit and, for sure, Prada is one of them."
