= Belle du Seigneur =

1968 book by Albert Cohen

- Author: Albert Cohen
- Translator: David Coward
- Language: French
- Publisher: Éditions Gallimard
- Publication date: 1968
- Publication place: Switzerland
- English publication date: 1995
- Pages: 848
- ISBN: 2-07-026917-5

Belle du Seigneur is a 1968 novel by the Swiss writer Albert Cohen. Set in Geneva in the 1930s, the narrative revolves around a Mediterranean Jew employed by the League of Nations, and his romance with a married Swiss aristocrat. The novel is the standalone third part in a series of four; it follows Solal of the Solals and Nailcruncher, and precedes Les Valeureux. It received the Grand Prix du roman de l'Académie française. In 1995, it was published by Viking in an English translation by David Coward.

== Reception ==
Emma Klein of The Independent wrote in 1995: "Notwithstanding passages of lyricism which rival the Song of Songs, Belle du Seigneur is more than a love story. At root, with its superb, minutely observed satire of human pretensions and frailties, its frequent, haunting allusions to death lurking in wait, it is the scriptural 'Vanity of Vanities' made pulsating, exuberant flesh."

== Film adaptation ==
An English-language film adaptation starring Jonathan Rhys Meyers and Natalia Vodianova was completed in 2012 and was released in Russia in November and in France in June 2013.

== See also ==
- 1968 in literature
- 20th-century French literature
