= Valerie Perrine =

American actress (1943–2026)

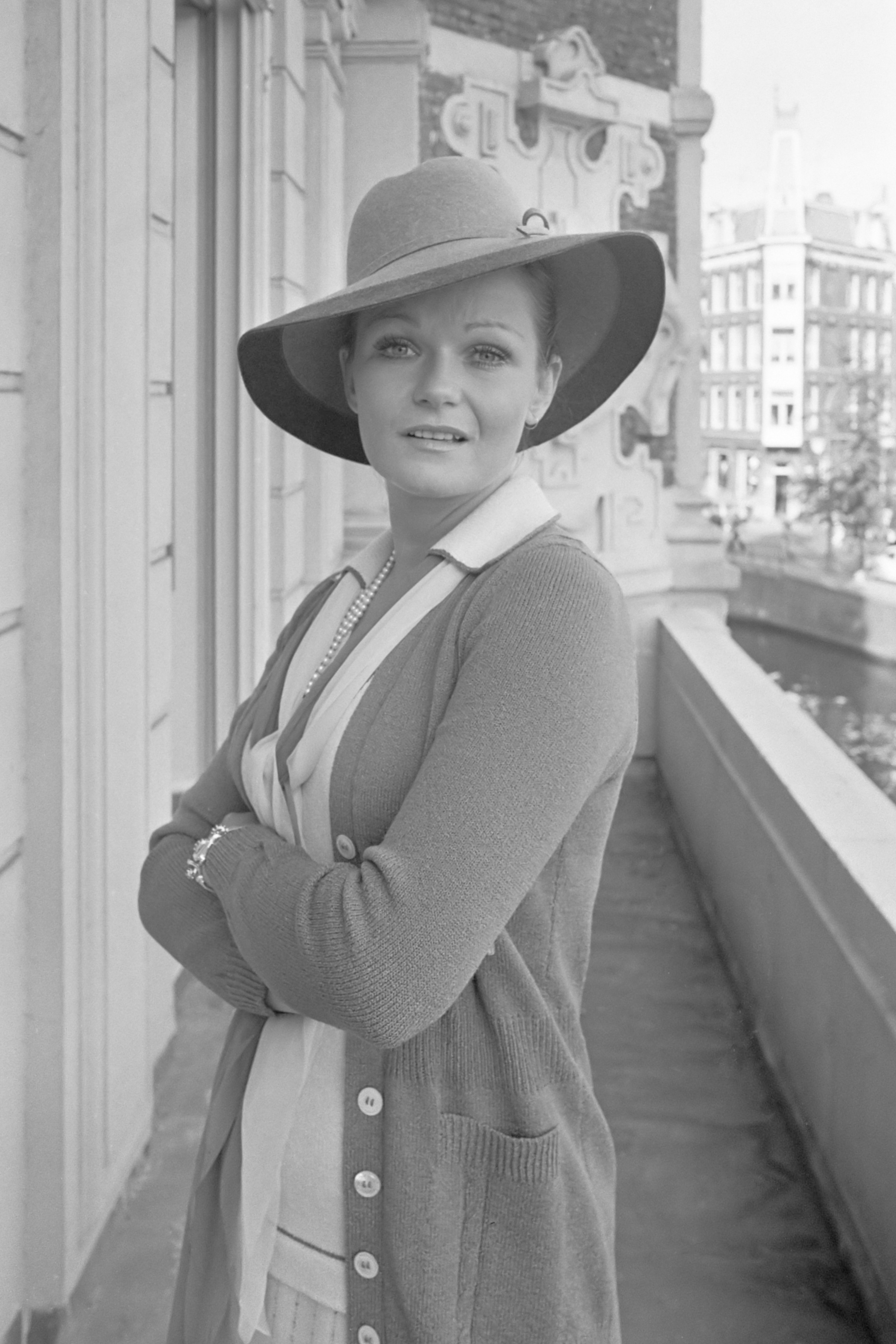
- Perrine in 1975
- Born: Valerie Ritchie Perrine; September 3, 1943; Galveston, Texas, U.S.
- Died: March 23, 2026 (aged 82); Beverly Hills, California, U.S.
- Occupation: Actress
- Years active: 1971–2016

Valerie Ritchie Perrine (September 3, 1943 – March 23, 2026) was an American actress. She was best known for her portrayal of Honey Bruce in the film Lenny (1974). For the role, she won the BAFTA Award for Most Promising Newcomer to Leading Film Roles and the Best Actress Award at the Cannes Film Festival, and she received an Academy Award nomination for Best Actress.

Perrine also appeared in Slaughterhouse-Five (1972), Superman (1978), The Electric Horseman (1979), and Superman II (1980).

== Early life ==
Valerie Ritchie Perrine was born on September 3, 1943, in Galveston, Texas, the daughter of Winifred "Renee" (nee McGinley), a dancer who appeared in The Earl Carroll Vanities, and Kenneth I. Perrine, a lieutenant colonel in the United States Army. She had a younger brother, Ken. Because of her father's military career, the family moved frequently, and Perrine lived several locations during her childhood. When she was three, the family relocated to Japan, where her father was stationed, and later moved to a ranch in Arizona during her teenage years.

Her mother was of Scottish and Irish descent and came from Helensburgh in Dunbartonshire. Her father was of English and French ancestry and was the grandson of Alfred Perrine of Wallkill, Orange County, New York, and a descendant of Staten Island Huguenot Daniel Perrin. The Perrine family traces its lineage to the French Perrin line, which intermarried with other Norman families dating back to the era of William the Conqueror in 1066.

== Career ==
In 1968, Perrine worked as a showgirl in "Lido de Paris" at the Stardust Resort and Casino in Las Vegas.

After several years in Las Vegas, Perrine moved to Los Angeles. "Acting wasn’t something I pursued," she later recalled. "I was at a small dinner party where an agent was looking for someone to play the role of Montana Wildhack in George Roy Hill’s film production of Slaughterhouse-Five. The agent saw something in me and thought I would be perfect for the part. That’s how I became an actress." Her performance as Montana Wildhack, a softcore pornography actress, established Perrine as a rising actress in Hollywood.

Perrine was photographed nude for a pictorial in the May 1972 issue of Playboy, and she later appeared on the magazine's cover in August 1981. She became the first actress to appear nude intentionally on American network television during the May 4, 1973, PBS broadcast of Bruce Jay Friedman's Steambath on Hollywood Television Theater. Later in 1973, she appeared in the episode "When the Girls Came Out to Play" of the romantic anthology television series Love Story (1973).

In 1975, Perrine received an Academy Award nomination for Best Actress and a Golden Globe nomination for Best Motion Picture Actress (Drama), and she won the Best Actress Award at the Cannes Film Festival for her portrayal of Honey Bruce, the wife of comedian Lenny Bruce, in Bob Fosse's Lenny (1974).

She portrayed Carlotta Monti, the longtime companion of W. C. Fields, in the biographical film W. C. Fields and Me (1976). Perrine then played Miss Eve Teschmacher, the accomplice of criminal mastermind Lex Luthor, in Superman (1978), earning a 1979 Saturn Award nomination for Best Supporting Actress. She later reprised the role in the sequel Superman II (1980).

Perrine appeared as Charlotta Steele, the ex‑wife of a rodeo champion played by Robert Redford, in The Electric Horseman (1979). Her career became more uneven after her role in Can't Stop the Music (1980), for which she received a Razzie Award nomination for Worst Actress; the film has since developed a cult following. She played Marcy Smith, the wife of a corrupt police officer, in The Border (1982) with Jack Nicholson, and in 1986 starred opposite Harvey Korman in the short-lived CBS sitcom Leo & Liz in Beverly Hills.

In the following years, Perrine appeared in lower‑profile projects, though she had a small supporting role in Mel Gibson's film What Women Want (2000). In 1995, she guest‑starred on Homicide: Life on the Street, playing an ex-wife of Richard Belzer's character, Detective John Munch.

Stacey Souther directed and produced Valerie, a 45-minute documentary about Perrine's career and her experience with Parkinson's disease. The film screened at the Edmonton Film Festival in 2020.

== Personal life ==
While living in Las Vegas, Perrine became engaged to gun collector and importer Bill Haarman, who died in January 1969 from an accidental gunshot wound to the lung, one month before their planned wedding.

After his death, Perrine began a relationship with hairstylist Jay Sebring. On August 8, 1969, he invited her to a dinner party with his former girlfriend, actress Sharon Tate, and their friends Abigail Folger and Wojciech Frykowski at the El Coyote Cafe on Beverly Boulevard in Los Angeles, but she was unable to attend. Shortly after midnight on August 9, all four were murdered by members of the Manson Family at Tate's home in Benedict Canyon, Los Angeles

According to The Hollywood Reporter, a performer at the now‑demolished Stardust joked, 'If you don’t like somebody, fix them up with Valerie and he’ll be dead within three months."

=== Illness and death ===
Perrine was diagnosed with Parkinson's disease in 2015. In 2017, she underwent dental surgery to repair her teeth damaged by medication used to manage the condition.

Perrine died at her home in Beverly Hills on March 23, 2026, at the age of 82. The official cause of death was acute cardiopulmonary arrest with Parkinson's disease being the underlying cause of death and dementia being a contributing factor.

Perrine was interred at Forest Lawn Memorial Park (Hollywood Hills). It had been her final wish, but due to medical expenses, a GoFundMe was started to cover the cost of the funeral. It reached its goal, and she was buried on April 16.

== Filmography ==
=== Film ===
Year	Title	Role	Notes
1972	Slaughterhouse-Five	Montana Wildhack	Film debut
1973	The Last American Hero	Marge	
1974	Lenny	Honey Bruce	
1976	W. C. Fields and Me	Carlotta Monti	
1977	Mr. Billion	Rosie Jones	
1978	Superman	Eve Teschmacher	
1979	The Magician of Lublin	Zeftel	
1979	The Electric Horseman	Charlotta Bell	
1980	Agency	Brenda Wilcox	
1980	Can't Stop the Music	Samantha "Sam" Simpson	
1980	Superman II	Eve Teschmacher	
1981	The Cannonball Run	Female Cop (uncredited)	
1982	The Border	Marcy Smith	
1985	Water	Pamela Weintraub	
1985	Mask of Murder	Marianne McLaine	
1987	Maid to Order	Georgette Starkey	
1990	Bright Angel	Aileen	
1991	Reflections in a Dark Sky	Caterina	
1993	Boiling Point	Mona	
1995	The Break	Delores Smith	
1995	Girl in the Cadillac	Tilly Baker	
1998	Curtain Call	Monica Gilroy	a.k.a. It All Came True
1998	Brown's Requiem	Marguerita Hansen	
1998	A Place Called Truth	Estelle	
1998	My Girlfriend's Boyfriend	Rita Lindgross	
2000	What Women Want	Margo	
2001	Directing Eddie	Gloria Vassick	Short
2002	The End of the Bar	Mrs. Duncan	
2005	The Amateurs	V	
2005	The Californians	Lenora Tripp	
2006	Superman II: The Richard Donner Cut	Eve Teschmacher	
2008	Redirecting Eddie	Gloria Vassick	
2016	Silver Skies	Ethel	
2017	The Fabulous Allan Carr	Herself	Documentary

=== Television ===
Year	Title	Role	Notes
1972	The Couple Takes a Wife	Jennifer Allen	Television movie
1973	Lady Luck	Lady Luck	Television movie
1973	Steambath	Meredith	Television movie
1973	Love Story	Marlene	Episode: "When the Girls Came Out to Play"
1978	Ziegfeld: The Man and His Women	Lillian Lorraine	Television movie
1982	Marian Rose White	Stella White	Television movie
1983	Malibu	Dee Staufer	Television movie
1983	When Your Lover Leaves	Ronda Thompson	Television movie
1985	Faerie Tale Theatre	Tina	Episode: "The Three Little Pigs"
1986	Leo & Liz in Beverly Hills	Liz Green	Main role
1987	CBS Summer Playhouse	Molly	Episode: "Changing Patterns"
1988	Una casa a Roma	Julie	Television movie
1989	Quattro storie di donne	Rose	Episode: "Rose"
1989	Sweet Bird of Youth	Lucy	Television film
1991	Burning Shore	Isabelle	Television film
1992	Northern Exposure	Jackie Vincoeur	Episode: "The Bad Seed"
1993	Ghostwriter	April Flowers	Episode: "Who's Who: Part 3"
1993	The Secrets of Lake Success	Honey Potts Atkins	Television miniseries
1994	Burke's Law	Suzanne Dubonet	Episode: "Who Killed the Romance?"
1995	Homicide: Life on the Street	Brigitta Svendsen	Episode: "Law & Disorder"
1995	ER	Cookie Lewis	Episodes: "Motherhood", "And Baby Makes Two"
1996	Nash Bridges	Mrs. Nassiter	3 episodes
1997	The Practice	Jane Elaine	Episode: "Hide and Seek"
1998	Walker, Texas Ranger	Marge Wyman	Episode: "Eyes of a Ranger"
1998–1999	As the World Turns	Dolores Pierce	Soap opera
2001	Just Shoot Me!	Carol	Episode: "Where's Poppa?"
2001	Family Law	Helen Watson	Episode: "The Gay Divorcee"
2001	The Beast	Mrs. Silberger	Episode: "The Delivery"
2002	Grounded for Life	Maureen Bustamante	Episode: "I Fought the In-Laws"
2005	Third Watch	Merlene	Episode: "Welcome Home"
2011	Lights Out	Mae	2 episodes

== Awards and nominations ==
Year	Association	Category	Nominated work	Result
1974	New York Film Critics Circle	Best Supporting Actress	Lenny	Won
1974	New York Film Critics Circle	Best Actress	Lenny	Nominated
1974	National Board of Review	Best Supporting Actress	Lenny	Won
1975	Cannes Film Festival	Best Actress	Lenny	Won
1975	Golden Globe Award	Best Actress in a Motion Picture – Drama	Lenny	Nominated
1975	Academy Awards	Best Actress in a Leading Role	Lenny	Nominated
1976	British Academy Film Awards	Most Promising Newcomer to Leading Film Roles	Lenny	Won
1976	British Academy Film Awards	Best Actress	Lenny	Nominated
1979	Academy of Science Fiction, Fantasy and Horror Films	Best Supporting Actress	Superman	Nominated
1980	Golden Raspberry Awards	Worst Actress	Can't Stop the Music	Nominated
1985	CableACE Award	Best Actress in a Comedy Series	Faerie Tale Theatre	Nominated
