= W. C. Fields and Me =

1976 film by Arthur Hiller

- Theatrical poster
- Directed by: Arthur Hiller
- Written by: Bob Merrill
- Based on: W. C. Fields & Me; 1971 book by Carlotta Monti; Cy Rice
- Produced by: Jay Weston
- Starring: Rod Steiger; Valerie Perrine; Jack Cassidy; John Marley
- Cinematography: David M. Walsh
- Edited by: John C. Howard
- Music by: Henry Mancini
- Production company: Universal Pictures
- Distributed by: Universal Pictures
- Release date: March 31, 1976
- Running time: 111 minutes
- Country: United States
- Language: English

W. C. Fields and Me is a 1976 American biographical film directed by Arthur Hiller and starring Rod Steiger and Valerie Perrine. The screenplay by Bob Merrill is based on a memoir by Carlotta Monti, mistress of actor W. C. Fields during the last 14 years of his life. The film was released by Universal Pictures.

== Plot ==
The story begins in 1924 in New York City, where W. C. Fields is a Ziegfeld Follies headliner, and ends with his 1946 death in California at age 66. In between, it dramatizes his life and career with emphasis on the latter part of both, when the "Me" of the title, Carlotta Monti, played a prominent role, with a number of fictionalized events added for dramatic impact.

Having lost his girlfriend Melody to another man and most of his life savings due to careless investments by his broker, Fields heads west to Santa Monica, where he operates a wax museum until he's offered a film role. He quickly becomes a major screen presence and a notorious drinker.

While at a party with his friends John Barrymore, Gene Fowler and restaurant owner Dave Chasen, Fields is introduced to starlet Carlotta Monti, whom he hires as a live-in secretary. In order to stifle her theatrical aspirations, he arranges a screen test. The studio boss Harry Bannerman decides she has some talent, but Fields threatens to quit Paramount Pictures unless she is discouraged from pursuing a career in films. When she learns the truth, Carlotta leaves him and goes to New York.

When Barrymore passes away, she returns to Hollywood to comfort Fields. On the set of My Little Chickadee, she learns why her efforts to get him to marry her have routinely been rebuffed: His first marriage never had been dissolved legally. Although hurt by the revelation, Carlotta resigns herself to a life of unwedded bliss that often crumbles into sorrow and frustration as the relentlessly mean-spirited Fields continues to drink heavily and as his health steadily declines. The comic is hospitalized, and after enduring great physical pain, dies on Christmas Day, a holiday he had despised with a passion.

== Principal cast ==
- Rod Steiger as W.C. Fields
- Valerie Perrine as Carlotta Monti
- Jack Cassidy as John Barrymore
- John Marley as Bannerman
- Bernadette Peters as Melody
- Dana Elcar as Dockstedter
- Paul Stewart as Florenz Ziegfeld
- Billy Barty as Ludwig
- Allan Arbus as Gregory LaCava
- Milt Kamen as Dave Chasen
- Louis Zorich as Gene Fowler
- Andrew Parks as Claude Fields

== Production notes ==
Karen Black was offered the role of Carlotta. However, she turned it down in order to work with Alfred Hitchcock on his final feature-film Family Plot.

Rod Steiger's makeup was an early assignment for makeup artist Stan Winston.

The Pacific Electric Railway car used in the film had been saved from the scrap heap, refitted with an internal combustion engine, rubber tires, and a steering mechanism, and used in several period films set in Los Angeles before its appearance in this film. In 2001, it was refurbished to operate on a rail line serving San Pedro, California.

The mansion used for this film was located at 700 Berkshire Avenue, LaCanada Flintridge, Los Angeles County, and it previously was owned by William Joseph Connery, a silent-movie era independent movie producer. He called the home Villa Ardaree, and it was known before that as Dryborough, named after the original owners.

== Critical reception ==
In his review in The New York Times, Vincent Canby called the film "dreadful" and added "It holds up a wax dummy of a character intended to represent the great misanthropic comedian and expects us to feel compassion but only traps us in embarrassment...the movie needn't have been quite as brainless as it is. That took work. First off, Bob Merrill...has supplied a screenplay that originally may have been meant as the outline for a musical. It exhibits a tell-tale disregard for facts and the compulsion to make a dramatically shapeless life fit into a two-act form...Then there's Arthur Hiller, a director who makes intelligent films when the material is right... and terrible ones when the writers fail. Most prominent in the mess is Rod Steiger, who...reads all of his lines with the monotonous sing-song manner used by third-rate nightclub comics doing Fields imitations. He also speaks most of them out of the corner of his mouth as if he'd had a stroke."

Judith Crist in her TV Guide review wrote that Steiger as Fields looked "like Van Johnson with a clown nose".

Time Out London calls it a "witless biopic [that] leaps through pseudo-history with cretinous inaccuracy. Sloppily slung together, hell-bent on wringing hearts with the drama of the last, lonely, drink-sodden years, it can't get even the simplest facts straight, and doesn't do much of a job on the tear-jerking either...Steiger makes a brave stab at the part, but the reality and genius of Fields never get a look in."

However, TV Guide awarded it three out of a possible four stars with the comment: "Though the great comedian would have hated this film [and Fields purists undoubtedly will be outraged with the many inaccuracies in it], this movie biography...has a certain appeal thanks to Steiger's handling of the lead role...Rather than ape Fields, [he] creates his own interpretation of the man, capturing subtle nuances that create a better-rounded character."

As of 2021, the film is available on digital video.
