= Disquiet (film) =

- Directed by: Michael Winnick
- Written by: Michael Winnick
- Produced by: Steven Paul
- Starring: Jonathan Rhys Meyers
- Release date: February 10, 2023
- Running time: 85 minutes
- Country: United States
- Language: English

Disquiet is a 2023 American mystery horror thriller film written and directed by Michael Winnick and starring Jonathan Rhys Meyers.

== Cast ==
- Jonathan Rhys Meyers as Sam
- Lochlyn Munro as Frank
- Elyse Levesque as Monica
- Bradley Stryker as Gaunt Man
- Anita Brown as Sarah
- Garry Chalk as Virgil
- Rachelle Goulding as Lily
- Mila Jones as Little Girl

== Release ==
The film was released in theaters, on digital platforms and on demand on February 10, 2023.

== Reception ==
The film has a 0% rating on Rotten Tomatoes based on eight reviews. Randy Myers of The Mercury News awarded the film one star.
