= Albert Cohen (novelist) =

Greek-born Swiss novelist (1895–1981)

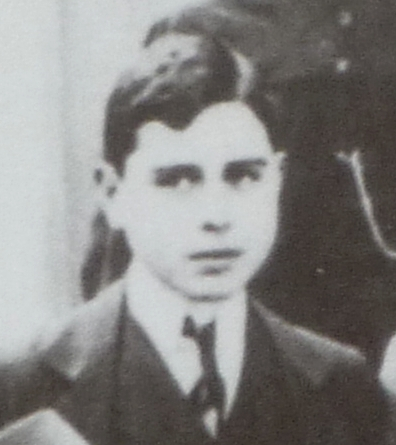
- Cohen in 1909
- Born: Abraham Albert Cohen; August 16, 1895 Corfu, Kingdom of Greece
- Died: October 17, 1981 (aged 86) Geneva, Switzerland
- Occupation: Novelist

Abraham Albert Cohen (August 16, 1895 – October 17, 1981) was a Greek-born Romaniote Jewish Swiss novelist who wrote in French. He worked as a civil servant for various international organizations, such as the International Labour Organization. He became a Swiss citizen in 1919.

== Biography ==
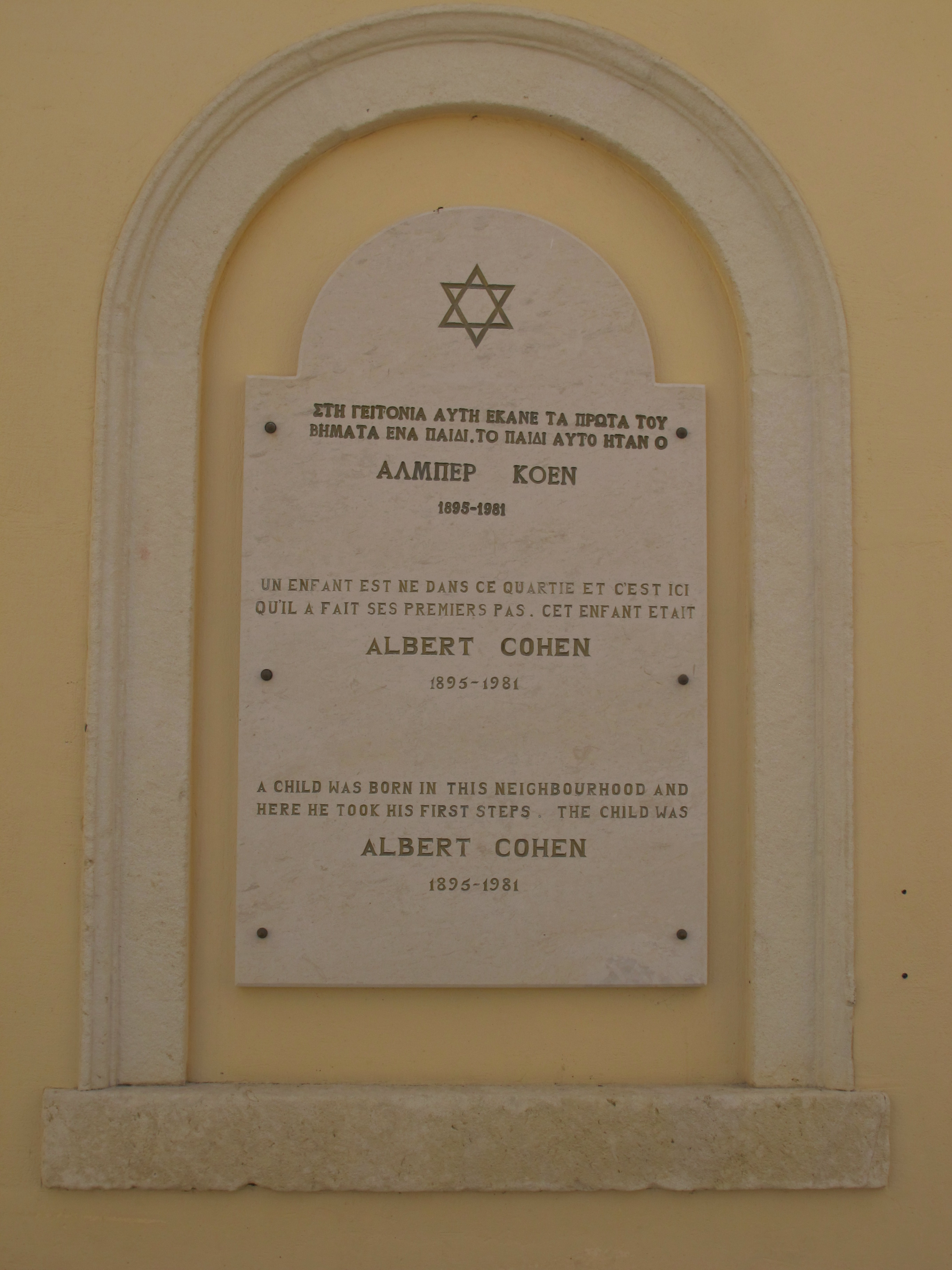
A plaque in the synagogue of Corfu

Abraham Albert Cohen (Greek: Αβραάμ Αλβέρτος Κοέν) was born in Corfu, Greece, in 1895, to Greek Jewish parents. Albert's parents, who owned a soap factory, moved to Marseille, France, when he was a child. Albert Cohen discusses this period in his novel Le Livre de ma mère (The Book of My Mother). He studied at a private Catholic school. In 1904, he started high school at Lycée Thiers, where he met and started a lifelong friendship with Marcel Pagnol, and graduated in 1913.

In 1914, he left Marseille for Geneva, Switzerland, and enrolled in law school. He graduated from law school in 1917 and enrolled in literature school in 1917, where he remained until 1919. In 1919, he became a Swiss citizen. That same year he married Elisabeth Brocher, who in 1921 gave birth to their daughter, Myriam. In 1924, his wife died of cancer. In 1925, Albert Cohen became director of Revue Juive (The Jewish Review), a periodical whose writers included Albert Einstein and Sigmund Freud. From 1926 to 1932, he worked in International Labour Organization in Geneva. In 1933, he married his second wife, Marianne Goss.

In 1939, living in France, he became a personal representative of Chaim Weizmann, the president of the Zionist Organization. He helped Jewish refugees from Nazism to reach Palestine. In 1940, after the German invasion in France, Cohen fled to London. The Jewish Agency for Palestine then made him responsible for establishing contacts with exiled governments. On January 10, 1943, Cohen's mother died in Marseille. That same year, he met his future third wife, Bella Berkowich. In 1944, he became an attorney for the Intergovernmental Committee on Refugees. In 1947, Cohen returned to Geneva where he held a senior post in International Refugee Organization until 1954. In 1957, he turned down the post of Israeli Ambassador in order to pursue his literary career.

He died in Geneva at the age of 86 and is buried in the Jewish Cemetery of Veyrier, near Geneva.

== Cohen's literature ==
Through four different books, Cohen's fiction can be considered as one long autobiographical fiction. It is the story of the radiant Solal – Cohen's double – a handsome and successful civil servant of the League of Nations whose charismatic identity is a constant struggle between his Jewish roots and his social status.

His masterpiece, Belle du Seigneur, originally included the novel that was later published as Les Valeureux. Belle du Seigneur is called "the book of love", and tells Solal's passionate, cruel yet realistic love affair with Ariane Deume, a married non-Jewish woman. In 1968, the novel received the French Academy award. Since then, the novel has been one of the biggest sellers of the prestigious Gallimard White Collection. In 2022, Cohen's works were published in the prestigious Bibliothèque de la Pléiade.

== Novels, plays, autobiographical works ==
- Paroles juives - (1921) (Jewish Words)
- Ézéchiel - (1927) - play
- Solal - (1930) translated as Solal of the Solals - (1933)
- Mangeclous - (1938) translated as Nailcruncher - (1940)
- Le Livre de ma mère - (1954) translated as Book of my Mother - (1997)
- Belle du Seigneur - (1968) Grand Prix du roman de l'Académie française translated under the same title - (1995)
- Les Valeureux - (1970)
- Ô vous, frères humains - (1972) (O Humans, My Brothers)
- Carnets - (1978, 1979) (Notes)

== See also ==
- Le Monde's 100 Books of the Century, a list which includes Belle du Seigneur
