= Sue Clayton =

Film director, professor and activist

Professor Sue Clayton
- Born: Newcastle upon Tyne
- Occupation: Film Director
- Employer: Goldsmiths University of London
- Notable work: Films: The Stansted 15 On Trial (2019); Calais Children: A Case to Answer (2017); Hamedullah: The Road Home (2012); The Disappearance of Finbar (1996) Books: The New Internationalists: Activist Volunteers in the European Refugee Crisis (2020)

Sue Clayton is a UK film director, writer and activist, best known for her work on the rights of refugee children. Her documentary films have been cited as evidence in UK court cases involving asylum seekers.

As well as making films, and consulting and producing for ITV and BBC, Clayton is professor of film and television at the new Screen School at Goldsmiths, University of London, and visiting senior research fellow at the Centre for Urban Research at York University.

In 2015, Clayton co-founded the Goldsmiths Human Rights Film Festival.

== Career ==
Clayton grew up in a working-class suburb of Newcastle and attended a state school. At 17, she won a scholarship to Cambridge University to read English, where she became active in the women's movement. She studied photography at Polytechnic of Central London (PCL, now Westminster University) where she met Jonathon Curling and together they started working on an experimental video about women's experiences in the clothing trade. It evolved into a three-part series called The Song of the Shirt. Clayton was still working on the film when she started her Masters in Film at Royal College of Art. She cites this period in the late 70s as transformative. "It transformed as, and many like me, from a fairly conservative young woman with still limited work options, into an artist and activist who would traverse music, film and video making, exhibition, writing and political organisation."

In 1990 Clayton turned the short story, The Last Crop, by noted Australian author Elizabeth Jolley, into a feature film, starring Kerry Walker and Noah Taylor.

She was the subject of a Channel Four documentary Upstarts, broadcast on Channel 4 in August 1999.

Calais Children: A Case To Answer came about after Clayton visited the notorious refugee camp in France, Calais Jungle, intending to make a short documentary. She was shocked to see so many unaccompanied children and returned with a team of human rights lawyers from Duncan Lewis solicitors in London.

The Stansted 15 On Trial follows the court trial of 15 activists who blocked the deportation of 60 undocumented migrants at Stansted Airport in March 2017, by locking themselves around a government-chartered Boeing 767 to prevent take-off. Judge Christopher Morgan found them guilty of a terrorism-related offence but gave suspended sentences or community orders after he accepted they were motivated by "genuine reasons". Clayton's 20-minute film is available for free broadcast.

In 2003 Diet Coke commissioned her to research what ingredients made a box office hit so they could better choose which films to sponsor. Clayton came up with the formula Action: 30% Comedy: 17% Good v Evil: 13% Love/sex/romance: 12% Special effects: 10% Plot: 10% and Music: 8%. She identified Toy Story 2 as the best example.

Clayton's 2011 documentary, Hamedullah: The Road Home, was filmed by a young refugee who had been sent back to Kabul. Clayton gave him a digital camera and turned the resulting footage into an award-winning film. The film has been used as evidence in UK court cases to make the case that returning young refugees to Afghanistan is not safe.

Her 2017 documentary Calais Children: A Case to Answer, played a role in the British High Court's determination that some unaccompanied minors had rights to settlement under the Dubs Amendment. The documentary follows her and a team of lawyers she brought to the Calais Jungle Camp, as well as the story of their successful challenge in the High Court. Clayton won seven international awards for the film.

== Selected filmography ==
2019 The Stansted 15 On Trial

2017 Calais Children: A Case to Answer — A multi-award-winning documentary

2013 Too Sensitive To Touch — US feature documentary co-directed with Michael Oblowitz

2013 Teenagers In War Zones, for BBC television

2011 Hamedullah: The Road Home

2008 The Lost Girl

2007 Jumolhari

2005 Music And Dance Of Southern Italy

2003 The Memories

1997 The Disappearance of Finbar

1993 Dracula, The Undiscovered Country

1992 Heart Songs — Nominated for a British Academy Award for Best Short Film

1990 The Last Crop — Winner Irish Film Festival Award 1991

1983–6 The Commodities Series

1983 Women on Film

1982 Too Sensitive To Touch — Sex and Talk in the USA

1976–9 The Song Of The Shirt
