= 1979 Union Island Uprising =

Date	7th-9th December, 1979
Location	Union Island, Grenadines Parish, Saint Vincent and the Grenadines
Result	Vincentian victory: Secession attempt quashed

Belligerents
Union Island separatists Covert support: Grenada	Saint Vincent and the Grenadines Barbados

Commanders and leaders
Lennox 'Bumba' Charles	Milton Cato Ruthford Cox Tom Adams

Strength
54 rebels	44 Royal Saint Vincent and the Grenadines Police Force Officers 50 Barbados Defence Force Soldiers

Casualties and losses
- 1 rebel dead, 40+ arrested 1 civilian killed

The 1979 Union Island Uprising was a short lived and unsuccessful secession attempt by a small group of Unionite rebels.

== Background ==
Saint Vincent and the Grenadines peacefully achieved its independence from the United Kingdom on October 27, 1979. The Lesser Antillies were in a period of turmoil at the time, with Grenada undergoing revolution, La Soufrière erupting, and disarray from independence. Conditions on Union Island were especially poor at the time, fueling resentment across towards the central government across the island, further cemented by the community witnessing the tremendous progress being undertaken in neighboring Grenada, Carriacou and Petite Martinique.

== Independence plot ==
A group of disgruntled Unionites arranged a meeting with Maurice Bishop, Prime Minister of Grenada, on the neighboring island of Carriacou, where Bishop agreed to lend a boat full of Soviet weaponry as well as 50 soldiers. A plot was concocted wherein the rebels were to arrest any police officers on the island and declare independence, where they then would be recognized and supported by Grenada. However, the ship on which the weapons were loaded on sank, killing its driver with it, and causing all arms to be lost. Panicked, fearing that potential police investigation into the disappearance of the boat's driver would cause the arms to be uncovered, the rebels decided to begin the revolt early, against the wishes of Grenada.

== Uprising and suppression ==
On the 7th of December, 1979, a group of men led by Lennox 'Bumba' Charles, a Rastafarian man disillusioned by the conditions on the island led a group of like-minded rebels towards the Union Island police station, where the station was be bombed, causing the four police officers on the island to flee with no resistance. The men proceeded to seize facilities on the island, with the intention of declaring independence. They used the PA system of a local church to tell Union Islanders about the uprising.

The Saint Vincent Labour Party government led by Milton Cato, elected only two days prior and believing the revolt was a simple distraction away from a future coup, was immediately sent into a state of panic following news of the revolt, declaring a state of emergency and enforcing a dusk through dawn curfew across the nation until June the following year. Cato appealed to the United States, United Kingdom, and Barbados for assistance. Barbados was the only country who sent aid, a decision that was very controversial domestically. Barbados sent 50 soldiers to Kingstown. Vincentian police officers readied themselves on neighboring Palm Island, where they remained for a day due to them being uncertain about the size of the rebel group. Only 6 men are believed to have guarded the island at the time, with Bumba fleeing the island only a few hours after the revolt to nearby Carriocou, with many rebels soon going into hiding following his departure. Inspector Ruthford Cox, himself a native of the island, landed near Clifton and restore order, and soon embarked on an arrest spree, arresting anyone with dreadlocks and many innocent senior citizens, who soon were all shipped off to Fort Charlotte. There they were beaten, given little food, and forced to sleep on the cold floors of the prison with little bedding material available. One citizen, a supporter of the arriving policemen, was fatally shot as he was mistaken for a rebel. Shortly after the rebellion was crushed, Grenadian authorities arrested Bumba and extradite him to Saint Vincent where he was tried and put in jail. He served the longest prison sentence of everybody involved with the uprising.

== Aftermath and legacy ==
Only four men were ever charged for the revolt, including Bumba. The Barbados Defense Force, instrumental in the suppression of the revolt, later went on to participate in the U.S. led invasion of Grenada 3 years later. Public facilities on Union Island vastly improved in the decade following the uprising, largely quelling separatism and Unionite resentment towards the central government. Bumba, later released, is still viewed very positively in Union Island today, with him producing the island's first newspaper, starting the first steel orchestra and bringing the sport of basketball to the island.
