= Station Hill =

Station Hill may refer to:

- Station Hill development, Reading, a proposed redevelopment project in Reading, Berkshire, UK
- Station Hill, Saint Vincent and the Grenadines, a town located on the island of Mayreau

== See also ==
- Hill Station
