= Jacques Daudin =

Chinese-born French naturalist (1926-2011)

Jacques Pierre Marie Daudin
- Born: October 30, 1926; China
- Died: October 15, 2011 (aged 84); Union Island
- Education: Nancy-Université
- Occupation: Agronomist
- Known for: Union Island gecko
- Spouse: Monique Landreat
- Children: 1

Jacques Pierre Marie Daudin was a Chinese-born French agronomist and environmentalist, who lived and worked in the Caribbean and west Africa. Much of his later life was spent on Union Island, in Saint Vincent and the Grenadines. The Union Island gecko, scientifically described in 2005, is endemic to the island and named in his honor. He was the author of the books Socio-Political History of Union Island and A Natural History Monograph of Union Island.

== Life and career ==
Daudin was born in China to French ambassador Pierre Daudin and his wife Marie-Louise Daudin. His early schooling took place in China and in Vietnam, where he was childhood friends with future Cambodian King Norodom Sihanouk.

Daudin graduated in 1949 with a degree in Agronomic Science from the University of Nancy in France. After graduation, he married Monique Landreat (1926–2020).

In the 1950s, Daudin moved with his wife to the West Indies, first in Guadeloupe and then in Martinique, where he worked to improve crop diversification and banana production. His first and only child, Sylvie Ordon, was born in Martinique during this time. His wife worked as an audio/visual broadcaster for the Office de Radiodiffusion Télévision Française.

In 1962 he was published as an inventor on a patent for a new method of preserving banana plants, which used a wax emulsion to help protect bananas against the spread of Sigatoka disease.

He owned a house on Union Island and reportedly adopted as many as 30 children.

== Death ==
Near the last decade of his life, Daudin's health declined. He had a cancerous kidney removed in the year 2000 and later died of cancer on October 15, 2011, two weeks before his 85th birthday.
