= Robert Powell (herpetologist) =

American herpetologist (b.1948)

Robert ″Bob″ Powell (born 17 August 1948 in Germany) is an American herpetologist. His main research interest is in the herpetofauna of the Caribbean.

== Career ==
Powell was born in Germany but raised in Missouri. He received his Bachelor of Arts in 1970 from the University of Missouri and his Master of Arts in 1971 from the University of Missouri–Kansas City. In 1984, he received his Ph.D. from the University of Missouri with the thesis ″Variation in Spotted Salamanders (Ambystoma maculatum) from Missouri". In 1989, he became professor and coordinator in the biology department at the Avila College in Kansas City. From 1994 until 2018 he was professor for biology at the Avila University in Kansas City. In 2005, he described the gecko species Gonatodes daudini from Union Island, Saint Vincent and the Grenadines in collaboration with Robert W. Henderson.

Powell is member in the following organisations: American Society of Ichthyologists and Herpetologists, American Society of Mammalogists, Association of College and University Biology Educators, Association of Systematics Collections, Biological Society of Washington, Chicago Herpetological Society, Council on Undergraduate Research, Deutsche Gesellschaft für Herpetologie und Terrarienkunde, Herpetologists’ League, International Iguana Society, IUCN Diminishing Amphibian Task Force, IUCN Iguana Specialist Group, Kansas City Herpetological Society, Kansas Herpetological Society, Maryland Herpetological Society, Missouri Academy of Science, Missouri Herpetological Association, Missouri Prairie Foundation, Societas Europaea Herpetologica, Society for the Study of Amphibians and Reptiles, and Vida Silvestre Neotropical.

== Publications ==
- Henderson, R.W., and R. Powell (editors) (2018). Amphibians and Reptiles of the St. Vincent and Grenada Banks, West Indies Frankfurt am Main: Edition Chimaira. ISBN 978-3-89973-483-6
- Powell, R., R. Conant, and J.T. Collins (2016). Peterson Field Guide to Reptiles and Amphibians of Eastern and Central North America. Boston and New York: Houghton Mifflin Harcourt. ISBN 978-0-544-12997-9.
- Powell, R., J.T. Collins, and E.D. Hooper, Jr. (2012). A Key to the Herpetofauna of the Continental United States and Canada. Second edition, revised and updated. Lawrence, Kansas: University of Kansas Press.
- Henderson, R.W., and R. Powell (2009). Natural History of West Indian Reptiles and Amphibians. Gainesville, Florida: University of Florida Press.
- Henderson, R.W., and R. Powell (eds.) (2007). The Biology of Boas and Pythons. Eagle Mountain, Utah: Eagle Mountain Publishing LC.
- Powell, R., R.W. Henderson, and J.S. Parmerlee, Jr. (2005). The Reptiles and Amphibians of the Dutch Caribbean: St. Eustatius, Saba, and St. Maarten. Gallows Bay, St. Eustatius, Netherlands Antilles: St. Eustatius National Parks Foundation.
- Henderson, R.W., and R. Powell (eds.) (2003). Islands and the Sea: Essays on Herpetological Exploration in the West Indies. Ithaca, New York: Society for the Study of Amphibians and Reptiles Contributions in Herpetology. Vol. 20.
- Hodge, K.V.D., E.J. Cenksy, and R. Powell (2003). The Reptiles and Amphibians of Anguilla, British West Indies. The Valley: Anguilla National Trust.
- Powell, R., J.T. Collins, and E.D. Hooper, Jr. (1998). A Key to the Amphibians and Reptiles of the Continental United States and Canada. Lawrence, Kansas: University of Kansas Press.
- Powell, R., and R.W. Henderson (eds.) (1996). Contributions to West Indian Herpetology: A Tribute to Albert Schwartz. Itahaca, New York: Soc. Study Amphib. Rept. Contrib. Herpetol. No. 12.
