= Mayreau =

Island in Saint Vincent and the Grenadines

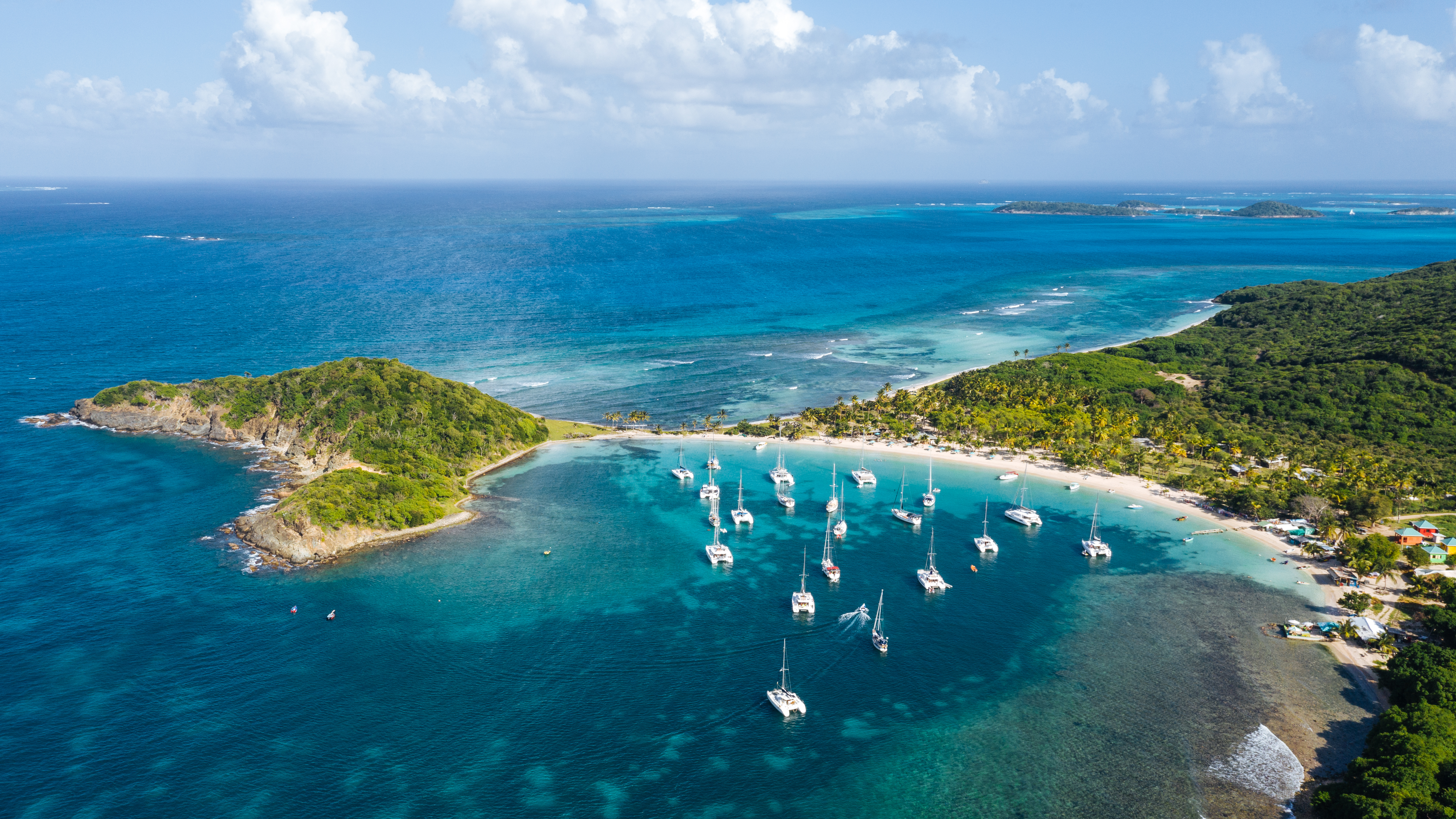
- Salt Whistle Bay on Mayreau

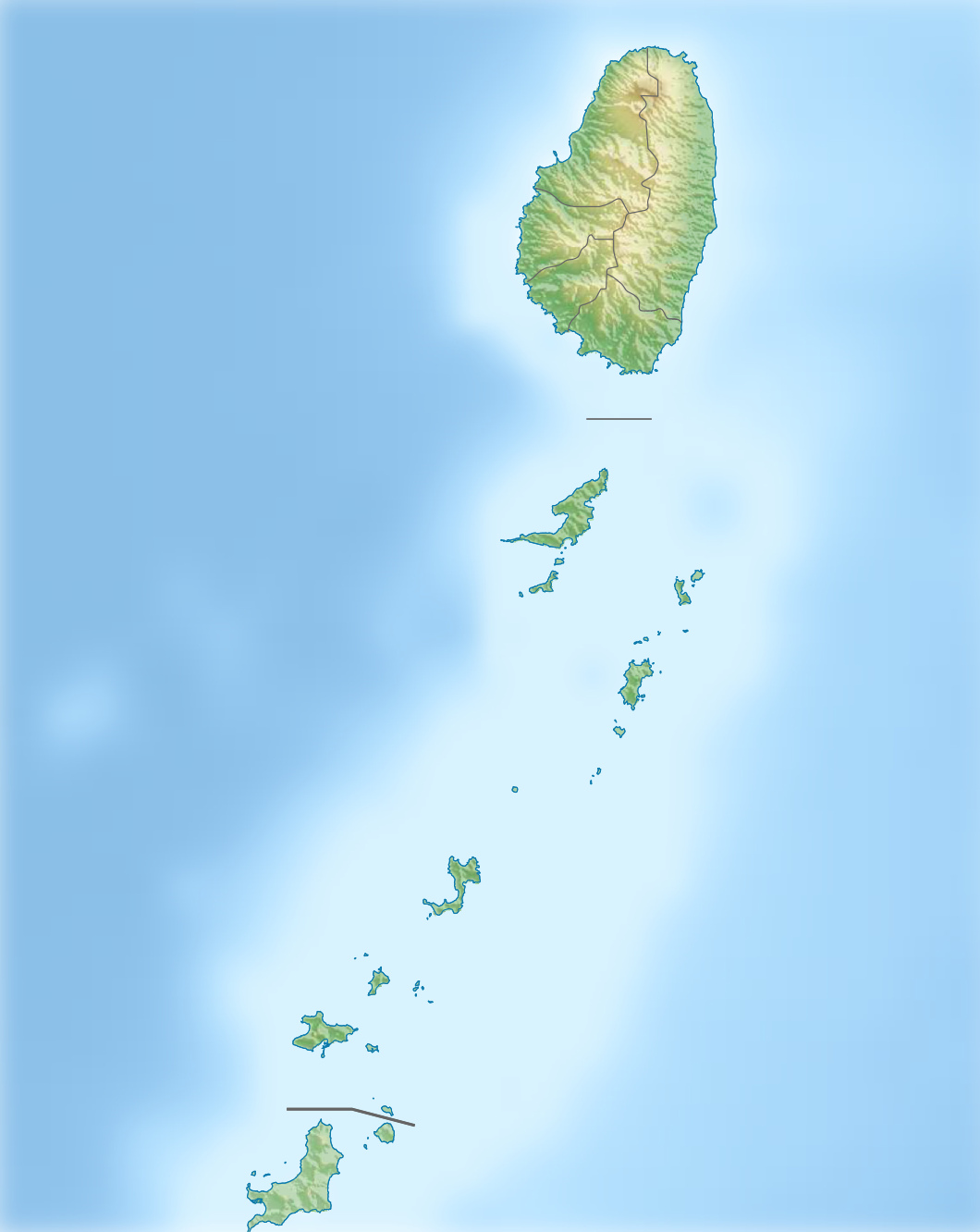
- Location within Saint Vincent and the Grenadines Location within Lesser Antilles Location within the Caribbean

Geography
- Location: Caribbean Sea
- Coordinates: 12°38.4′N 61°23.4′W
- Area: 0.46 sq mi (1.2 km^{2})
- Highest elevation: 280 ft (85 m)
- Highest point: Unnamed Hill

Administration
- Saint Vincent and the Grenadines

Demographics
- Population: 271

Additional information
- Official website: Mayreau and the Tobago Cays at grenadines.net

Mayreau is the smallest inhabited island of the Grenadines, with an area of about 0.46 sq. miles and a population of about 271. The population is centered in an unnamed village, located on Station Hill, a hilltop in the south-west of the island. It is an isolated community, accessible only by boat. Electricity was only recently (2002) provided by a central generator located on Saline Bay. There is a single-lane concrete road leading from the wharf on Saline Bay through the village to Saltwhistle Bay. The top of the island is crested with the small elementary school; the telecommunications building; the brick and stone Catholic Church of the Immaculate Conception, christened on May 12, 1930, and a Pentecostal church. From the crest of the hill behind the Catholic Church, there is an overlook of the Tobago Cays, Canouan and Union Island.

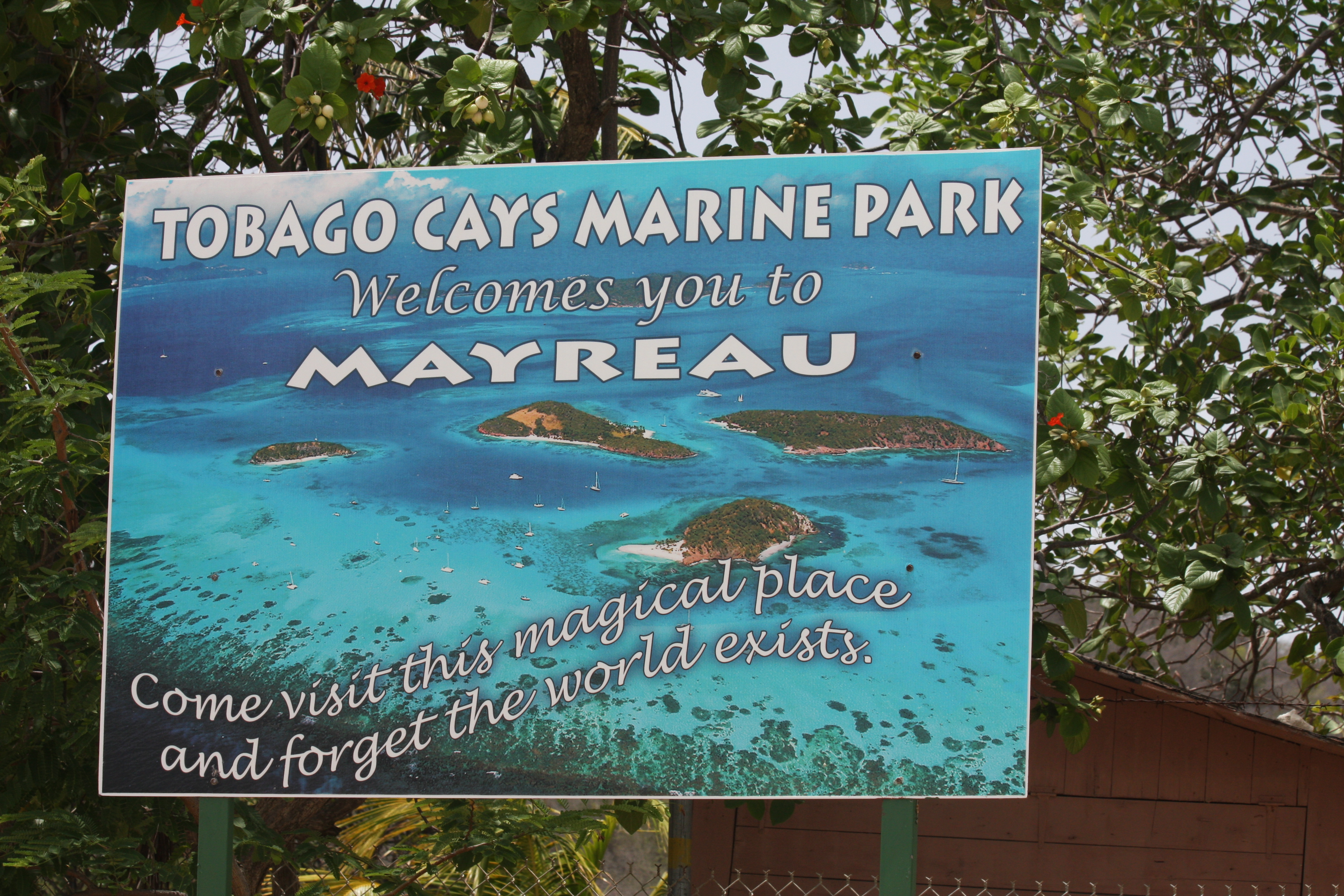
Welcome sign at Saline Bay, Mayreau Island

The island gets much of its water from three catchments set on the east side of the island. One serves the resort at Saltwhistle Bay and two serve the village. Saline Bay is named for the salt pond just east of the sandy beach. Salt was harvested and exported in times past but is now harvested only for local use. The island is populated mostly by fishermen and supported by tourism. The school has about 50 students from kindergarten to Grade 6. Upon completing their primary/elementary education, students attend secondary schools on neighbouring Union Island or the main island, St. Vincent. Mayreau also has a small resort area on Saltwhistle Bay, a very popular spot for anchoring yachts.

The Grenadines mail boat calls at Mayreau, but boarding can be difficult, as the vessel remains in deeper waters, with passengers being required to embark and leave through the use of smaller craft, which land on the nearby beach.
