= Tobago Cays =

Archipelago in the Southern Grenadines of Saint Vincent and the Grenadines

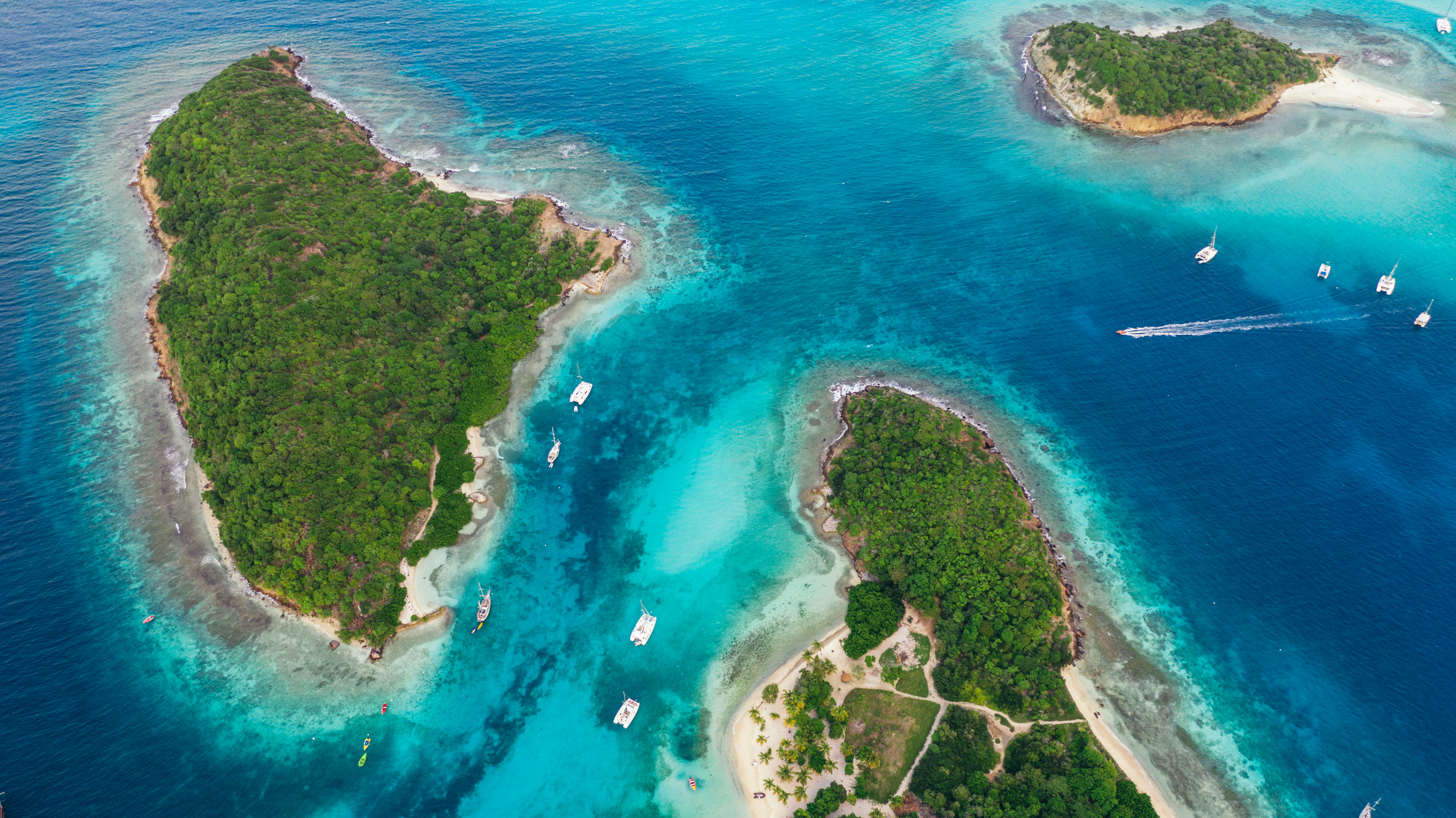
- Area view of the Tobago Cays

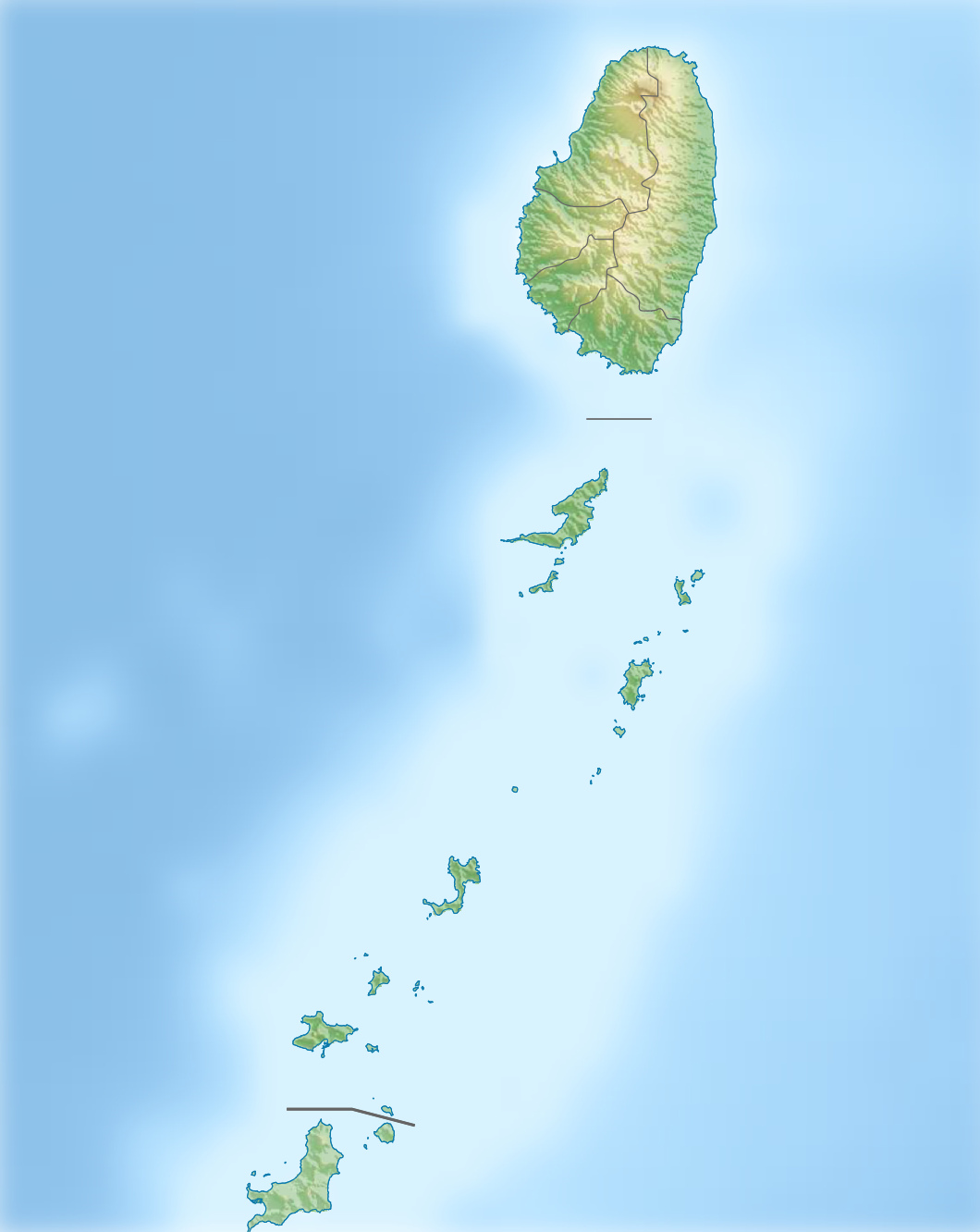
- Location within Saint Vincent and the Grenadines Location within Lesser Antilles Location within the Caribbean

Geography
- Location: Caribbean Sea
- Coordinates: 12°37.9′N 61°21.3′W
- Archipelago: Tobago Cays
- Total islands: 5
- Major islands: Petit Rameau, Petit Bateau, Baradal, Petit Tabac and Jamesby

Administration
- Saint Vincent and the Grenadines

Additional information
- Official website: The official site of the Tobago Cays Marine Park

The Tobago Cays are an archipelago located in the Southern Grenadines of Saint Vincent and the Grenadines comprising five small islands and extensive coral reefs. The cays – Petit Rameau, Petit Bateau, Baradal, Petit Tabac and Jamesby – are a popular tourism destination.

The Tobago Cays are now the key element of the Tobago Cays Marine Park, run and owned by the Saint Vincent and the Grenadines government. The marine park consists of a 1,400-acre (5.7 km^{2}) sand-bottom lagoon which encompasses the five cays, the inhabited island of Mayreau and the 4 km Horseshoe Reef. The marine park was listed as a regionally significant ecosystem under the SPAW (Specially Protected Areas and Wildlife) Protocol in December 2014. The most extensive and well-developed coral reef complexes in Saint Vincent and the Grenadines occur on shallow shelves around the windward sides of Mayreau and Union islands and the cays themselves. In addition, principal vegetation types include beach vegetation and dry forest. With the exception of a small mangrove in Petit Rameau and salt pond in Mayreau, there are no wetlands in the cays.

Major users of the area include: cruise ships (an estimated 50,000 visitors each year, of whom 10,000 visit the cays); yachts (an estimated 3,000 yachts anchor in the lagoon each year); day charters (from nearby hotels); sport divers and snorkelers; and fishing enthusiasts.

== Geology ==
The Grenadines are geologically older than St. Vincent and are situated on an extensive shallow bank of volcanic origin – known as the southern Lesser Antilles arc platform (SLAAP). The SLAAP is a product of Miocene uplift (23–16 Ma) and characterized by Eocene to Pliocene extrusive to intrusive igneous rocks along with sedimentary rocks such as limestone, marl, and chert, and epiclastic arc-derived volcaniclastic units composed of mudstone, sandstone, and conglomerate. The islands are composed of a variety of volcanic and sedimentary rocks. The area is an active subduction zone, and lies along the interface of the Caribbean and South American Tectonic plates. Kick 'em Jenny is an undersea volcano north of Grenada, and there is also another less active volcano named Kick 'em Jack in the area. The shallow bank of the Grenadines extends from St Vincent to Grenada, and has a natural boundaries of the Tobago Trough to the east and the Grenada Trough to the west, where the depth increases rapidly. The shallow bank creates ideal conditions for the formation of productive seagrass beds, mangroves and coral reefs.

== Coral reefs and seagrass beds ==
Surrounding the Tobago Cays are several shallow fringing reefs around the islands, and a major bank-barrier reef known as Horseshoe Reef. Other major reefs in the park include World's End Reef, Egg Reef and Mayreau Gardens. The fringing reefs around Mayreau and the Mayreau Gardens reef are considered to be the most biodiverse and healthy, with Horseshoe Reef and the reef around Petit Tabac being the next richest. Finally, the World's End and Egg reef, as well as the other fringing reefs are considered to be the most degraded and least diverse in the park. The common corals on the reefs are Orbicella annularis, Montastraea, Porites, Acropora, Millepora and Siderastrea species, as well as patches of soft corals such as gorgonians (sea fans) and sponges. Large fish, such as barracuda and jacks, are occasionally found in the park, although most of the fish species are small. Algae and disease are prominent across all reefs and affect coral health. Surveys in 2007 concluded that most reefs were dominated by dead coral rubble and had live coral cover between 5% and 30%, and all reefs are considered to be in decline.

Most sea grass beds lie within the shallow 'lagoon' south of Baradal in the centre of the cays, although there are tiny patches of sea grass near the Horseshoe back reef. The main species of seagrass are Thalassia testudinum and Syringodium, with small colonies of loggerhead sponges (Spheciospongia vesparium), various soft corals and small colonies of Porites and Siderastrea. The sea grass beds support several species of juvenile fish, green turtles (Chelonia mydas), starfish (Oreaster reticulatus), conchs (Strombus gigas) and sea eggs (Tripneustes ventricosus), however there are also significant areas of algae.

== Flora ==
The terrestrial flora consists mainly of dry forest, grasses and shrubs, including species such as coconut, agave, cactus, Coccoloba sp. and Diospyros sp. In the Tobago Cays Marine Park, highly poisonous manchineel trees (Hippomane mancinella) are well established on Petit Rameau, Baradal, and Jamesby islands. They appear more as low growth shrubs, rather than the tall trees found elsewhere in the Grenadines. There is one patch of red mangroves (Rhizophora mangle) on Petit Rameau – this species is rare within the country (although listed as least concern under the IUCN Red List). There are some Melocactus broadwayi on the cays, which are listed as near threatened under the IUCN Red List. Underwater, there are areas of seagrass beds which contain two threatened species - manatee grass (Syringodium filiforme) and turtle grass (Thalassia testudinum).

== Fauna ==
The marine park contains a number of important threatened species, both terrestrial and marine. There are populations of brown pelicans, bridled terns and iguanas in the park, and there are many migratory birds which pass through the area. The beaches and sea grass beds are feeding and nesting grounds for green turtles, hawksbill turtles and leatherback turtles. The reefs are home to many species of coral from the families Milleporidae, Octocorallia and Scleractinia. There are also populations of queen conch and Caribbean spiny lobster. Health of the reef is generally good with sharks sighted on dives regularly.

== History ==
The islands of Mayreau and the Tobago Cays were under private ownership from at least the 16th century up until 12 April 1999, when the cays were purchased after long negotiations by the state of Saint Vincent and the Grenadines. The purchases were restricted to the five islands of the cays, while the larger island of Mayreau remained in private hands.

In 1985, the Government of St. Vincent and the Grenadines (GOSVG) requested assistance from the Organization of American States (OAS) to develop tourism within the Grenadines. This led to a detailed proposal for the formation of a Tobago Cays National Park with initial investment costs estimated at US$1 million.

In 1987, the Fisheries Division established the Tobago Cays as a conservation area, along with nine other such areas, in which spear fishing was prohibited. The rectangular boundary of this area included the whole of Mayreau, the cays and most of the coral reefs, but was slightly smaller than the area now designated as a marine park. It has also been pointed out (ECLAC, 2002; IJA, 2004a) that the 1986 Fisheries Act only provided for the designation of marine reserves, not conservation areas.

=== Tobago Cays Marine Park ===
In September 1993 (as described by Espeut, 2006), the governments of France and St. Vincent and the Grenadines signed and launched the Tobago Cays Marine Park Project and produced an updated action plan (FMC, 1995).

In 1995 while the Tobago Cays were still under private ownership, Cabinet then approved a proposal to establish the Tobago Cays Marine Park (TCMP) including the island of Mayreau. On 25 November 1997, the Government enacted the Marine Parks Act and thereby created a Marine Parks Board that was to oversee the management and conservation of the TCMP, and any other marine parks to be designated in future.

The Tobago Cays were then declared a marine park in December 1997 by order published in the Official Gazette No. 40 of that year. Cabinet appointed the first Marine Parks Board in May 1998. On 8 July 1998, the Government gazetted the Marine Parks (Tobago Cays) Regulations, and in August 1998 a draft copy of the Tobago Cays management plan was submitted to the Marine Parks Board (Cordice, 1998). At this point, a series of problems began to appear. The regulations enacted for the park were not implemented, nor was the proposed fee structure, and the first draft management plan was never officially endorsed or adopted.

A set of revisions to the management plan was prepared in July 2000 (Cordice, 2000), but this also was never formally approved. Part of the problem was the uncertainty in the legal status and boundaries of the park. It has since been observed that the 1997 designation as a 'marine park' only included the actual islands of the park, and none of the surrounding sea area (Espeut, 2006).

In November 2001, a study by Caribbean marine park manager, Tom van't Hof (ECLAC, 2002), described the slow progress with implementation up to this time and outlined some of the problems. With legal discrepancies in the appointment of its members, the board ceased to operate in 2001, and French financial assistance to the park was discontinued at the end of that year. Since this time, various studies have been conducted, and alternative plans put forward for management of the park.

=== Private management controversy ===
In May 2003, it was announced that the Government was considering a proposal for the day-to-day management of the Tobago Cays to be contracted to the nearby but foreign-owned Palm Island Resort. While the proposal clearly provided some attractions for government, not least a guaranteed income from the park, there were also concerns over the proposer's apparent prioritization of profitability over biodiversity conservation. The plan would have seen several structures erected on the islands and the concept of handing a prized national asset to a private company caused a public outcry.

In September 2003, a local NGO – the Mayreau Environmental Development Organization (MEDO) – then submitted a counter-proposal to the Marine Parks Board. The Palm Island proposal was eventually withdrawn by the resort company, and in the end, neither proposal was accepted by government. In the meantime, additions were being suggested to the 'management plan' for the park, but still little was happening on the ground. Subventions provided by government paid the salaries of some park staff, but were usually insufficient to keep the boats running and maintain a regular presence in the park.

The June 2, 2003 plan by Palm Island Resort Limited (PIRL) for the management of the Tobago Cays clearly offended the public, including those in the southern Grenadines. On September 9 the Mayreau Environmental Developmental Organization (MEDO) made a counter proposal in response to the PIRL Proposal and this was soon followed by the formation of the Friends of the Tobago Cays - a not for profit, non-partisan group - in support of the MEDO's Proposal. The government swiftly and adamantly rejected the MEDO Management Proposal and alternatives to the PIRL's proposal and information regarding funding activities, namely, the Organization of Eastern Caribbean States (OECS) OPAAL Project funded by the World Bank, were discarded and referred to as "rubbish" by local authorities. The PIRL proposal had in fact violated parts of an earlier agreement to return the Tobago Cays from private investor ownership to the government of St. Vincent and the Grenadines, a deal made under the auspices of the Multilateral Investment Guarantee Agency (U.I.G.A.). Part of this agreement was that no commercial activity would be permitted in the Tobago Cays. The June 10–11, 1998 round of negotiations in Barbados formed the basis for Prime Minister Mitchell's public statement on this matter a year later. "I wish to warn that my government fully understands that should we ever entertain or engage or permit commercial activity in Tobago Cays we are creating opportunity for the original owners to re-open their claim for US $6.5 million plus interest accruing from today".(James Mitchell, April 12, 1999). Local stakeholders clearly viewed Palm Island's control of the Tobago Cays not to be in the interests of the local communities. The PIRL management proposal held no real benefits to local stakeholders, including those in the diving, yachting and day excursion industries. Concern over PIRL proposals cemented the formation of the Alliance of Union Island Environmental Organizations, which in turn approached other Vincentians for assistance. The Friends of the Tobago Cays (FOTC) had as its core element some members of the defunct National Trust of St. Vincent and the Grenadines and emerged as the organization that would bring the issues to the public's attention. The FOTC took up the challenge and embarked on an education program aimed at demonstrating the folly in handing over the management of the cays to a foreign private operator. The FOTC was animated in its quest to ensure that the Tobago Cays, a most valuable piece of our national heritage, was not handed over to a "foreign for-profit management" but that the cays be maintained and managed in a sustainable way for the benefit of all Vincentians and users of the park.

After critiquing the management plans of the PIRL, the FOTC expressed concerns in respect of (a) maintaining the integrity of our cultural and natural heritage; (b) financial arrangements; (c) the legal implications of commercial activity in the Tobago Cays; and (d) the handing over of regulatory functions of government to a private entity. The FOTC felt that the government was not being honest and transparent in its dealings with the local people. Government on the other hand took the view that the intervention of FOTC and others was undesirable to the government's agenda and this attitude was encapsulated in a comment made to an FOTC representative by Senator Julian Francis, Minister of Communication and Works at a Chamber of Commerce meeting that "lay people should stay out of certain issues". In a four-hour meeting between Prime Minister Ralph Gonsalves and the FOTC late 2003 the Prime Minister stated categorically "there was absolutely nothing that Friends of the Tobago Cays would be able to contribute that would sway his decision."

The FOTC's proceeded to conduct meetings with various stakeholders, including those in the Grenadines, the Government, Service Clubs and the Chamber of Industry and Commerce. Information was disseminated to the public through press releases, newspaper articles and radio programmes. A public petition which attracted thousands of signatures was sent to the Prime Minister. Following this, the FOTC hosted two major environmental conferences that were held on Union Island on April 24 and Kingstown April 26, 2004. Those sessions hosted facilitators from the Centre for Resource Management and Environmental Studies (CERMES), University of the West Indies - Cave Hill, the Florida Cays Natural Marine Sanctuary, MEDO, the Soufriere Marine Management Area in St. Lucia, Coral Resource Management, Bonaire and other regional consultants.

By late 2004 PIRL announced the withdrawal of its proposal to manage the Tobago Cays Marine Park, after a failed final attempt at a new management policy via a "Strategic Alliance Agreement between the government of St. Vincent and the Grenadines and Palm Island Resort Limited". This withdrawal notice was greeted with much satisfaction by many Vincentians but equally resented by the government. The government chided the critics of PIRL Management Proposal as "a small minority of Vincentians" who were at the same time accused of being "dishonest, vindictive, untruthful and malignant". But the reversal of the PIRL's Tobago Cays Management Proposal and the government's plan to hand over management to PIRL must be seen as the direct result of the collective efforts of Vincentians throughout the multi-island state who supported appropriate management structures to be put in place for the Tobago Cays Marine Park.

The challenge to the government and PIRL initially came from the people of the Southern Grenadines who brought the matter to the attention of mainland Vincentians. It was also the support of many stakeholders in the business sector and the tremendous effort put out by the Friends of the Tobago Cays in highlighting the negative social and environmental problems that would have resulted if the management of the Tobago Cays was handed over to Palm Island Resorts.

=== Relaunch of the marine park ===
At the present time, the Marine Parks Board (that was created to oversee the management and conservation of all marine parks in SVG), functions as the Board of Management for the TCMP, overseeing its day-to-day operations. The current arrangement lacks local involvement in decision making and gives too much responsibility to the board for operational matters rather than policy issues and national coordination. With four other marine parks proposed in the 2004 Protected Areas Systems Plan (IJA, 2004a), there is an urgent need to put the management of the TCMP and any future marine parks on firmer ground. Progress towards this was made in 2005 with the preparation of a fully revised draft Marine Parks Bill, but further challenges remain.

Towards these aims, the TCMP was 're-launched' by government on 2 December 2006 at a ceremony in Union Island, coinciding with the start of the main 2006-07 tourist season. From this time, the park administration has implemented a new user fee policy, as approved by cabinet on 1 November 2006.

== Issues and threats ==
Despite being described in various sources as one of the largest remaining pristine coral reef groups in the Windward Island, there is growing evidence that this ecosystem is being affected by non-sustainable use and natural environmental impacts. Significant sources of "natural" threats to corals are storm damage and white band disease and bleaching.

Key human induced impacts include: (i) overfishing attributed to both local fisher folks and visiting yachts (particularly in the use of spear guns); (ii) physical impacts associated with visiting yachts (anchor damage and running aground); (iii) snorkeling and diving; and (iv) bilge and wastewater discharge from yachts. Visitation is difficult to control due to number of boats (many of which are under an international flag) exacerbated by the absence of regular coast guard patrols.

Major stakeholder groups include "boat boys" (locals who service the visiting yachts); diver and hotel operators; and the fishers. There appears to be a growing perception among many of the locals that despite the increasing number of tourists and the presence of a world-class resource, they are not benefiting from the development area.

== Current management ==
The TCMP is governed by a Marine Parks Board, which contains ten members, including a chairperson and vice-chairperson. The ten members are two NGO representative, on nominee of the SVG National Trust, one nominee of the Hotel and Tourism Association, one nominee of the Minister of Tourism, one nominee of the Minister for Parks, the Chief Fisheries Officer, the Director of Finance (or nominee), the Solicitor General (or nominee) and the Commander of the Coast Guard (or nominee).

There are 13 staff working at the Marine Park Authority in Union Island. The authority is self-financed (from fees), it does not rely on government subventions. The Park Manager runs the operations of the TCMP, with a number of rangers, wardens, office attendants and administrative assistants. There is a total of 13 staff. The Tobago Cays Marine Park offices are located at Clifton harbour, Union Island.

Coral reefs are protected by a series of regulations which specify areas to anchor and windsurf, and prohibit fishing within most of the park. There are also measures to reduce the likelihood of coral damage from boats including speed restrictions and buoys setting out sailing areas. Regulations prevent waste dumping. Diving is limited to registered local dive shops. The flora or fauna is not allowed to be touched, and the substrate is not to be disturbed.

Sea grass beds are protected by a series of regulations which specify areas to anchor, and prohibit fishing within most of the park. There is a specific sea grass conservation area which is off limits to boats, although swimming and snorkelling is allowed.

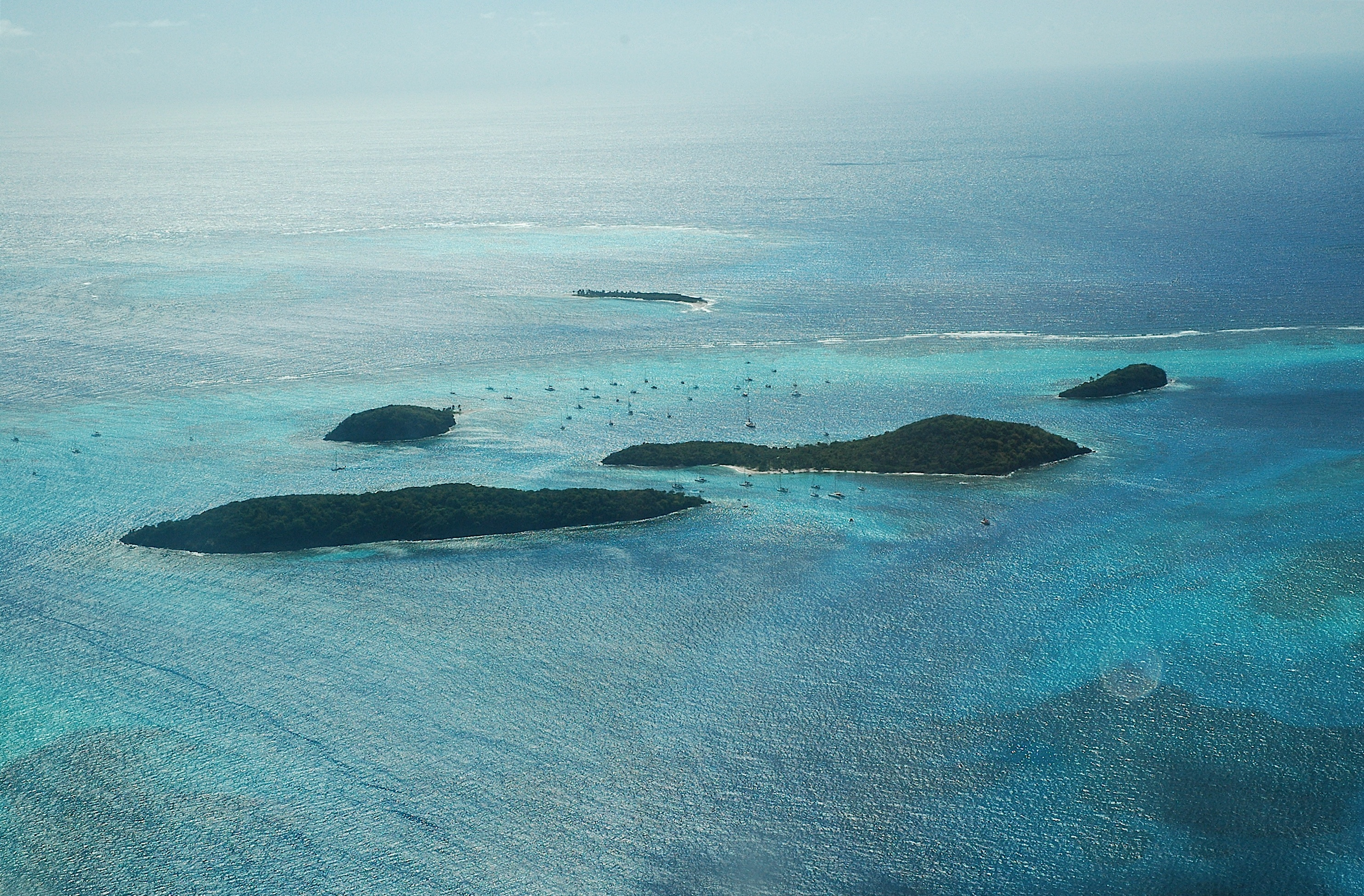
Tobago Cays Marine Park from the air

== Tourism ==
Tourism is the main activity within the marine park. Around 8000 yachts visit the cays each year, which includes many charter yachts, and day trips. Snorkelling and scuba diving is a popular activity within the park, there are four local dive shops in the surrounding islands – the most popular sites for scuba diving are Mayreau Gardens, Horseshoe Reef and World's End Reef. Cruise ships visit the park mainly in the high season from November to April. Visitors also use water taxis to visit the cays for a day trip, there are around 40 taxis in Union and 5–10 in Mayreau. There are a number of vendors in the park, selling T-shirts, handicrafts, ice, bread, fresh fish, fruits and vegetables to the visiting yachts. Vendors are restricted to the north beach of Petit Bateau. Wind surfing also occurs in the park. Hotels and restaurants in the surrounding islands are dependent on the park for drawing tourists to the area.
