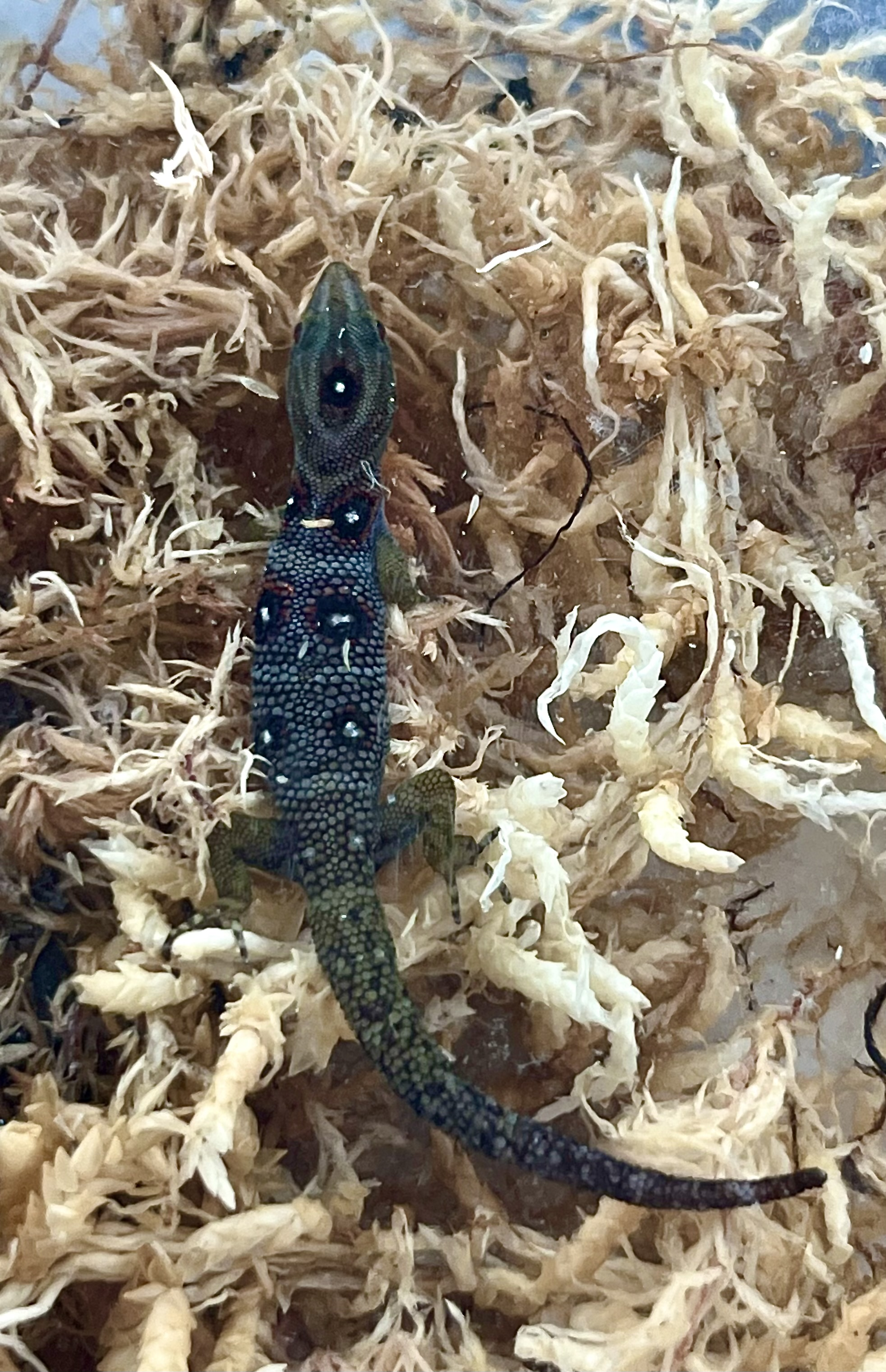
- A captive bred Gonatodes daudini in the USA (Terrarium Station LLC)

Conservation status
- Critically Endangered (IUCN 3.1)
- CITES Appendix I

Scientific classification
- Kingdom: Animalia
- Phylum: Chordata
- Class: Reptilia
- Order: Squamata
- Suborder: Gekkota
- Family: Sphaerodactylidae
- Genus: Gonatodes
- Species: G. daudini

Binomial name
- Gonatodes daudini Powell & Henderson, 2005

= Gonatodes daudini =

Species of lizard

Gonatodes daudini, also known commonly as the Grenadines clawed gecko or the Union Island gecko, is a species of lizard in the family Sphaerodactylidae. The species is endemic to Union Island in Saint Vincent and the Grenadines.

== Conservation status ==
The Union Island gecko is threatened by demand from the international pet trade. Due to its distinct markings, it is one of the most trafficked reptiles in the Eastern Caribbean. Although it is granted domestic protection from export, reportedly wild-caught animals have been reported as offered for sale in several European countries. The species listed on Appendix I of the Convention on International Trade in Endangered Species of Wild Fauna and Flora (CITES). Trained local residents have patrolled the tropical dry forest the gecko inhabits since 2017 in an attempt to deter poachers.

== Etymology ==
The specific name, daudini, is in honor of naturalist Jacques Daudin (1926–2011) who lived on Union Island.

== Habitat ==
The preferred habitat of G. daudini is remnant dry forest.

== Behavior ==
G. daudini is diurnal and terrestrial.

== Reproduction ==
A captive-bred hatchling on a fingertip for scale, beside its egg

G. daudini is oviparous. G. daudini females will lay 1 egg instead of a clutch of two. Eggs can be found under leaf litter. Can not be kept in trios. 1 male and 1 female only. Will breed year round if kept in appropriate conditions.
