= Ashton, Union Island =

Ashton
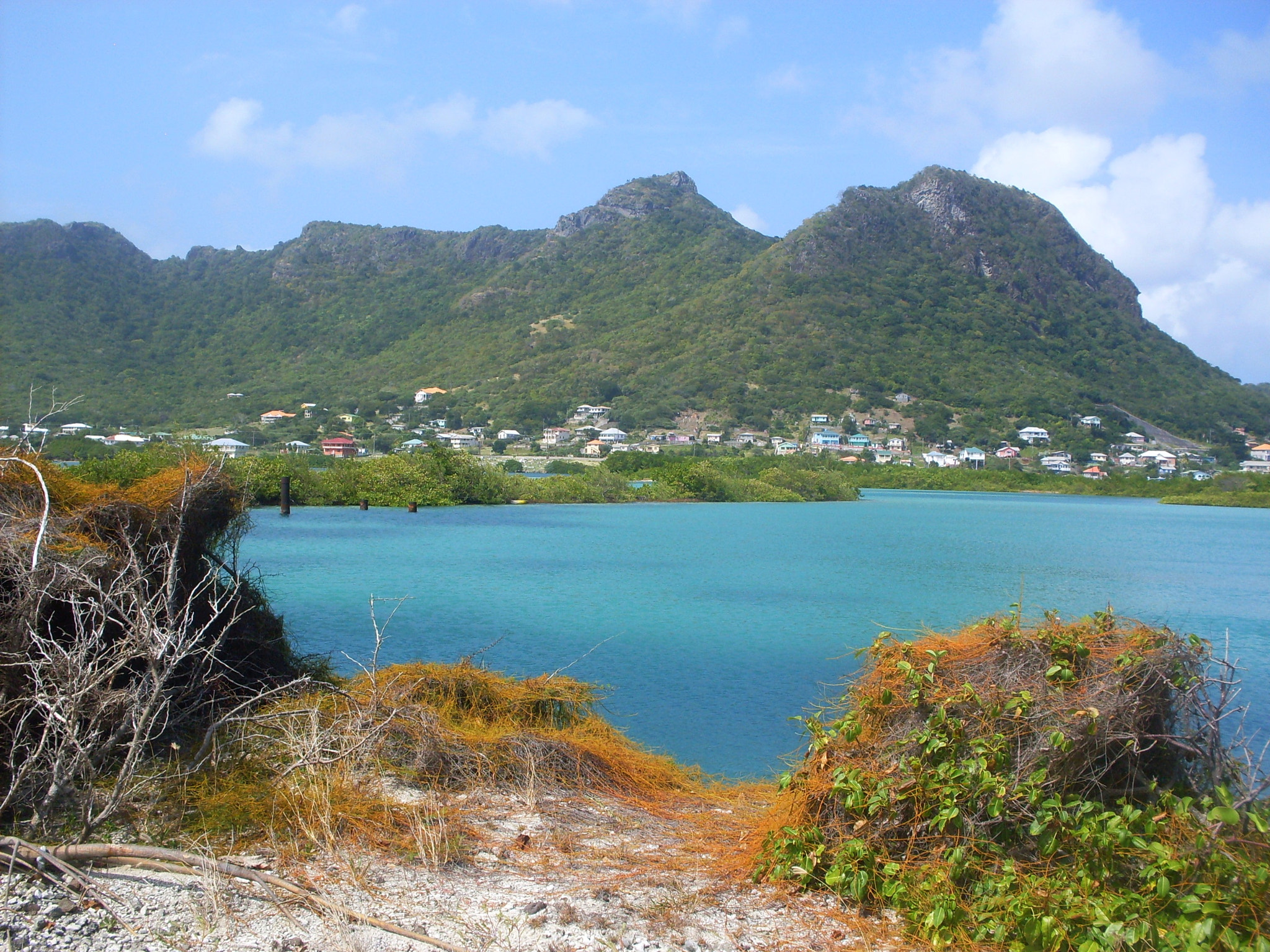

- Location in Saint Vincent and the Grenadines
- Coordinates: 12°35′41″N 061°26′05″W
- Country: Saint Vincent and the Grenadines
- Island: Union Island
- Parish: Grenadines

Ashton is a town located on Union Island, which is part of the Grenadines island chain of Saint Vincent and the Grenadines, located on the island's south coast. It has a Köppen climate classification code of Af.
