= Martinique Channel =

Strait in the Caribbean Sea

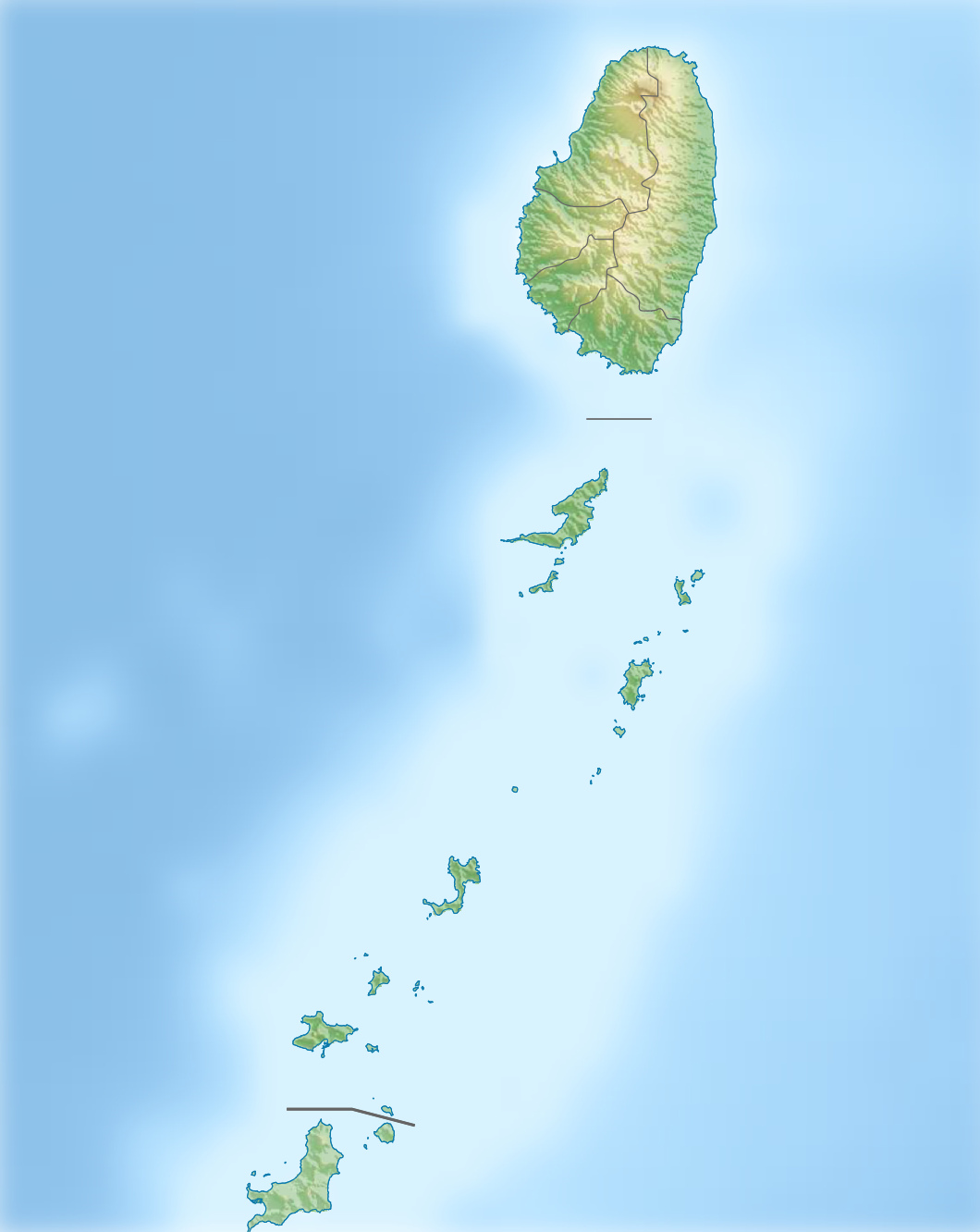
- Location within Saint Vincent and the Grenadines Location within Lesser Antilles Location within the Caribbean
- Coordinates: 12°34′00″N 61°25′00″W
- Basin countries: Saint Vincent and the Grenadines; Grenada

The Martinique Channel is a strait in the Caribbean Sea that separates Saint Vincent and the Grenadines from Grenada.

== See also ==
- Martinique
- Grenadines
- Carriacou and Petite Martinique
- Palm Island, Grenadines
