= Palm Island, Grenadines =

Island in the Grenadines

Palm Island
Native name: Prune Island
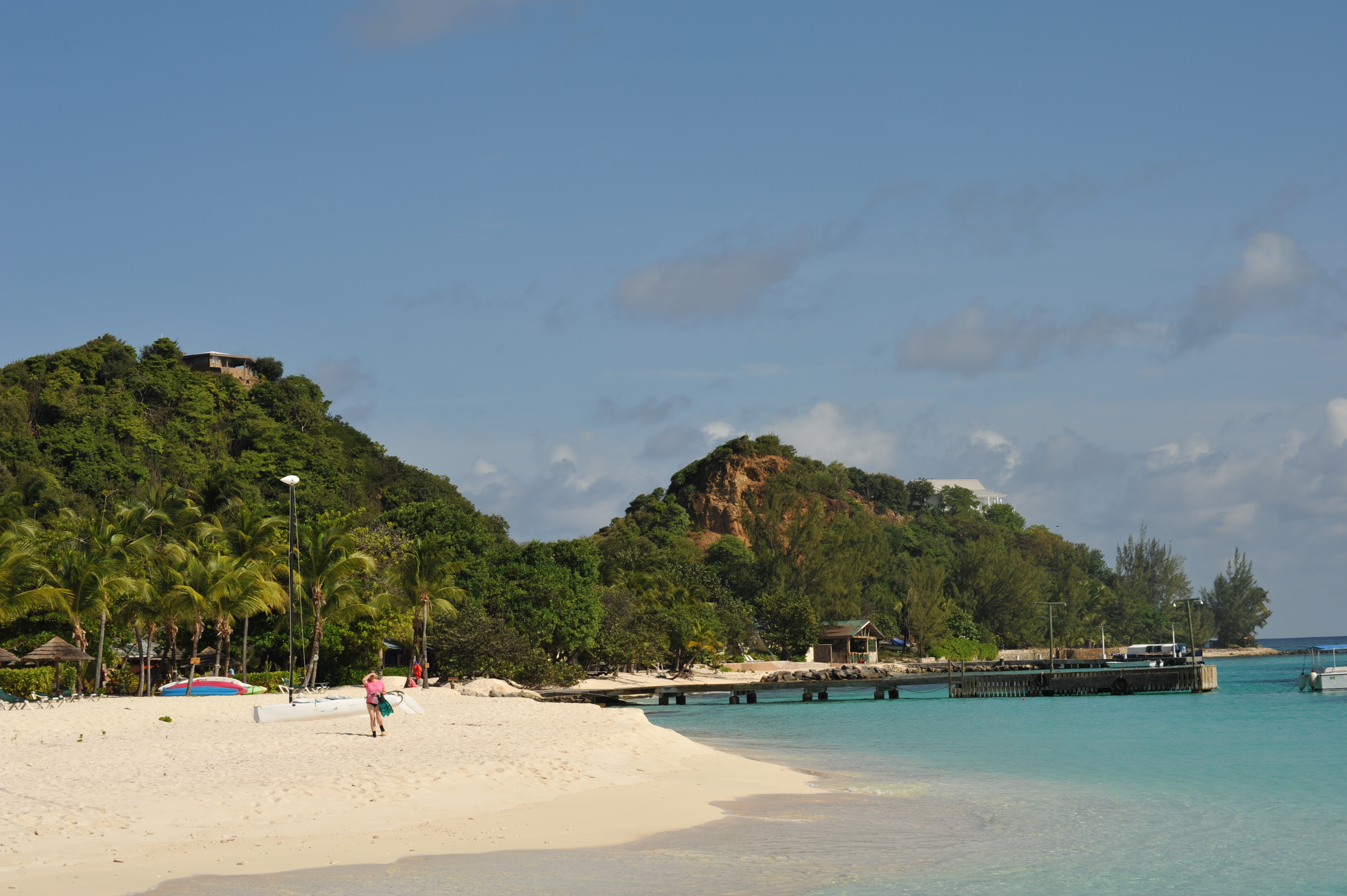
- Palm Island

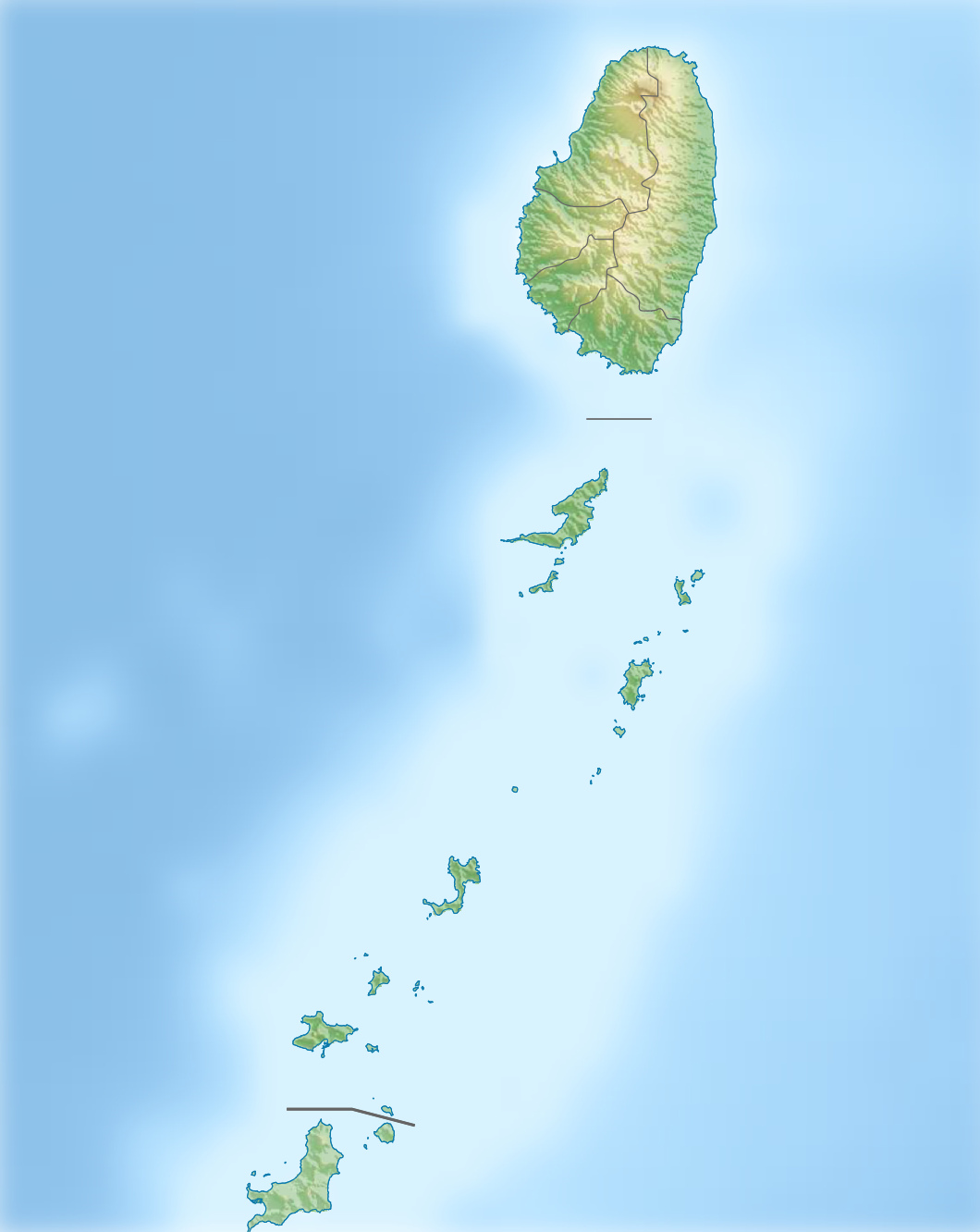
- Location within Saint Vincent and the Grenadines Location within Lesser Antilles Location within the Caribbean

Geography
- Location: Caribbean
- Coordinates: 12.585853°N 61.396537°W
- Archipelago: Grenadines
- Area: 135 acres (55 ha)

Administration
- Saint Vincent and the Grenadines

Additional information
- private island

Palm Island in the Grenadines is a small island one mile from Union Island, only accessible by boat. It has an area of 135 acres (0.55 km^{2}) and has five beaches.

Originally known as Prune Island, Palm Island got its current name when the former owners, the late John Caldwell ("Johnny Coconut") and his wife Mary, planted hundreds of coconut palms (Cocos nucifera), transforming the deserted, swampy, and mosquito infested island into a palm covered one. Its grass airstrip was sacrificed to the planting of more palms following the construction of a 752-metre (2,467 ft) concrete airstrip on Union Island. The circular air traffic control building remains although it is now used as a nursery for young palms.

== Nature ==
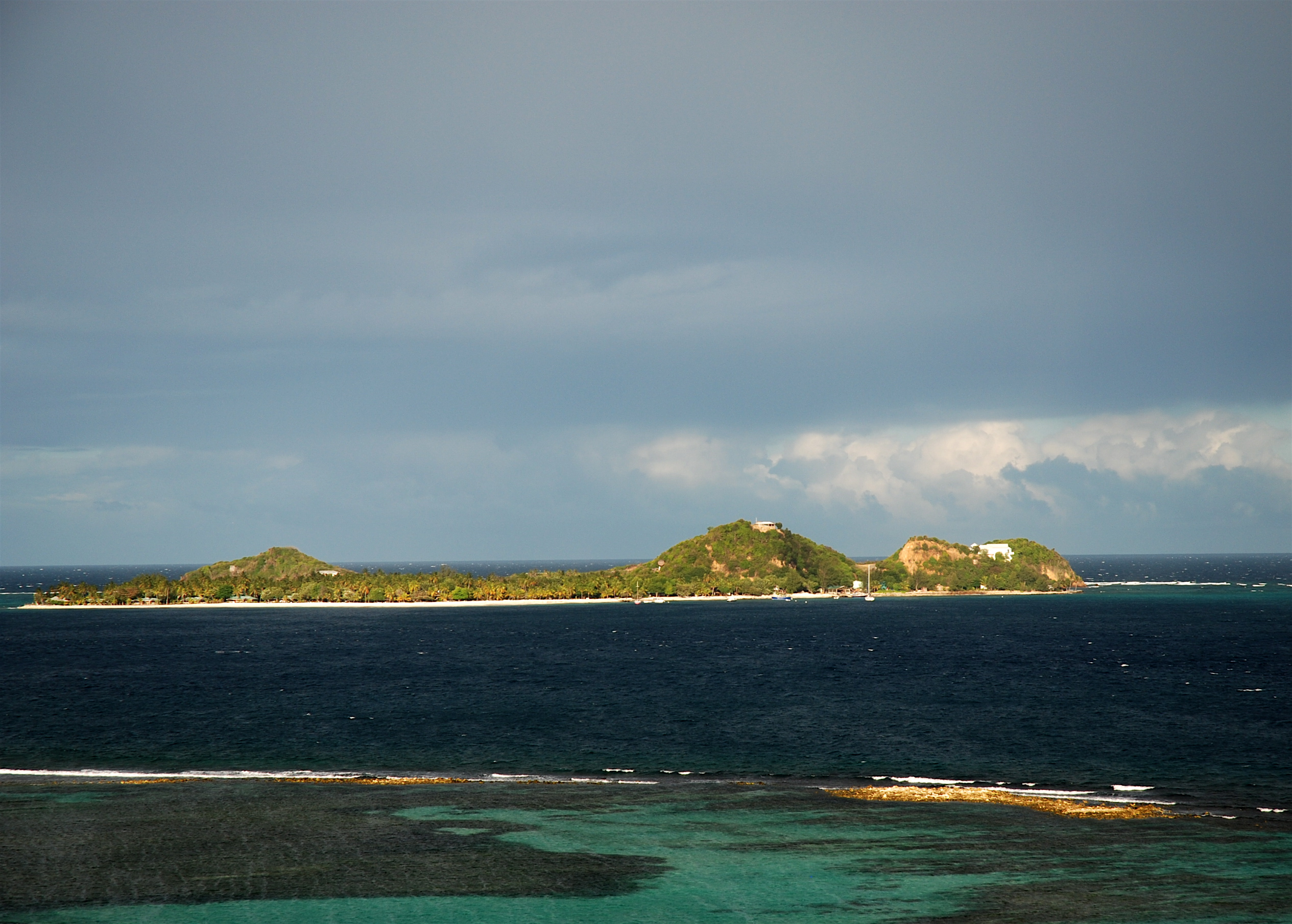
Palm Island from Union Island

The island is a haven for wildlife and during 2015, 125 land turtles were introduced to replace the small population that was washed away by Hurricane Ivan in 2004. Although not indigenous, the vegetation is akin to Union Island where the turtles were sourced and they are released from nursery cages as soon as they grow past the size where they would be prey to the native land iguanas.

Other wildlife easily seen are house geckos (Gekkonidae), ground and tree lizards, hermit crabs, land crabs (Coenobitidae). Sea turtles are reputed to come ashore to lay eggs but rare tracks are usually the only indication that they have visited. The island also provides habitation for pigeons and doves (Columbidae), common blackbird, tropical mockingbird, sandpipers, bananaquit, blue and crowned herons (Botaurus) and hummingbirds. The skies above are populated by osprey, laughing gull and frigatebird. Sand flies or "noseeums" (no-see-em, no-see-ums) as they are known colloquially combined with the ubiquitous mosquito occasionally annoy the hotel guests but blanket spraying by the hotel ground staff keeps their effect to a minimum.

== Tourism ==
Palm Island is the home of Palm Island Resort and Spa, with 40 rooms and suites and several private villas. There are two restaurants (the Royal Palm Restaurant and the Sunset Grill) and two bars, a spa, swimming pool, gym, library, tennis court, table tennis room and TV/Internet Room plus other facilities for guests. Typically the resort hosts 100 guests with 92 staff.

The island golf course has been reclaimed by the natural habitat with just the flagsticks remaining although a 300-metre (980 ft) driving range parallel to the Casuarina Beach still exists but is rarely used.

== See also ==
- Martinique Channel
