= Station Hill, Saint Vincent and the Grenadines =

Station Hill
- Location in Saint Vincent and the Grenadines
- Coordinates: 12.639°N 61.394°W
- Country: Saint Vincent and the Grenadines
- Island: Mayreau
- Parish: Grenadines

Station Hill is a town located on the island of Mayreau, which is part of the Grenadines island chain.

== See also ==
- Saint Vincent and the Grenadines
