= Clifton, Union Island =

Clifton
- Town
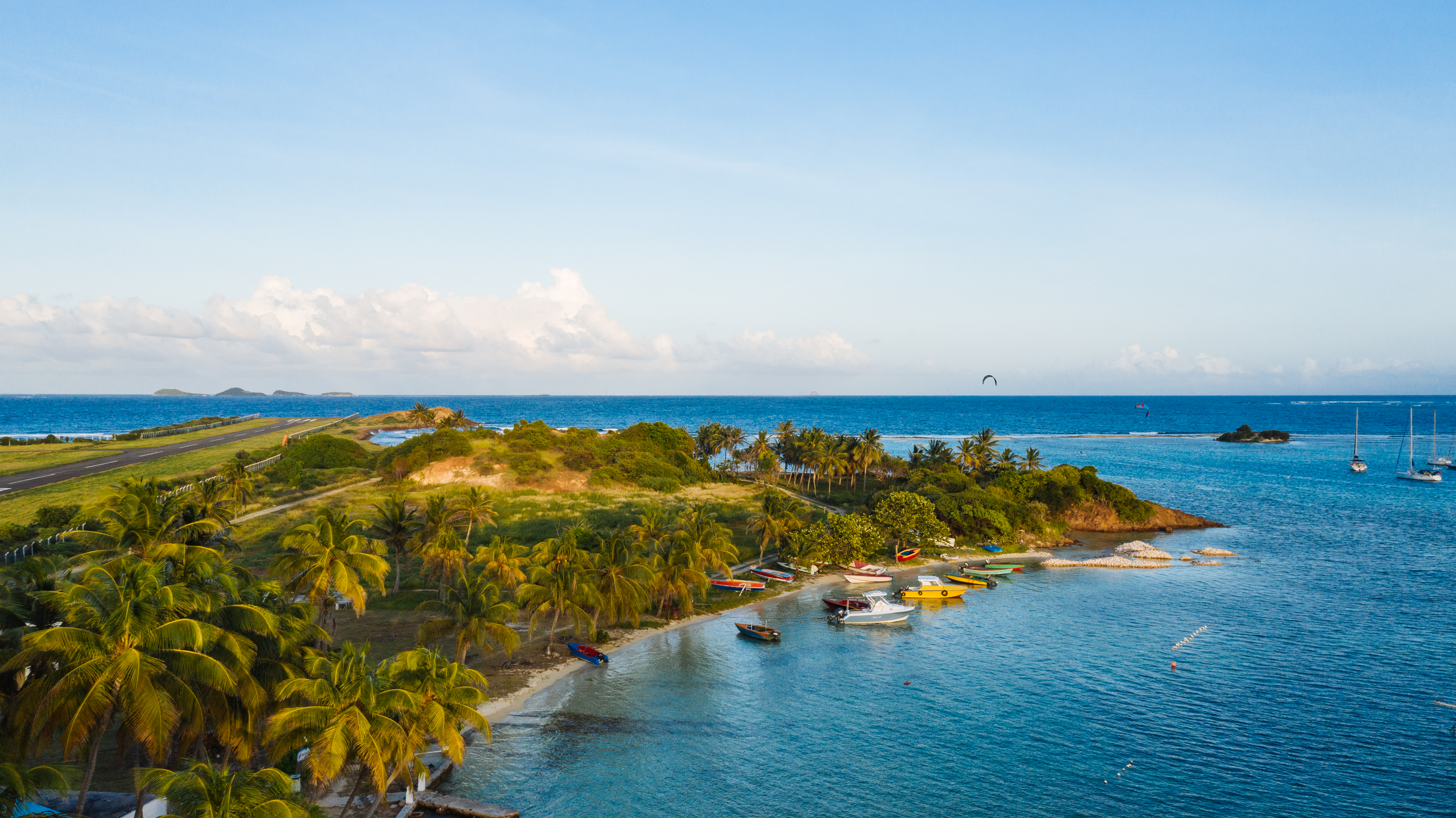
- View of Clifton

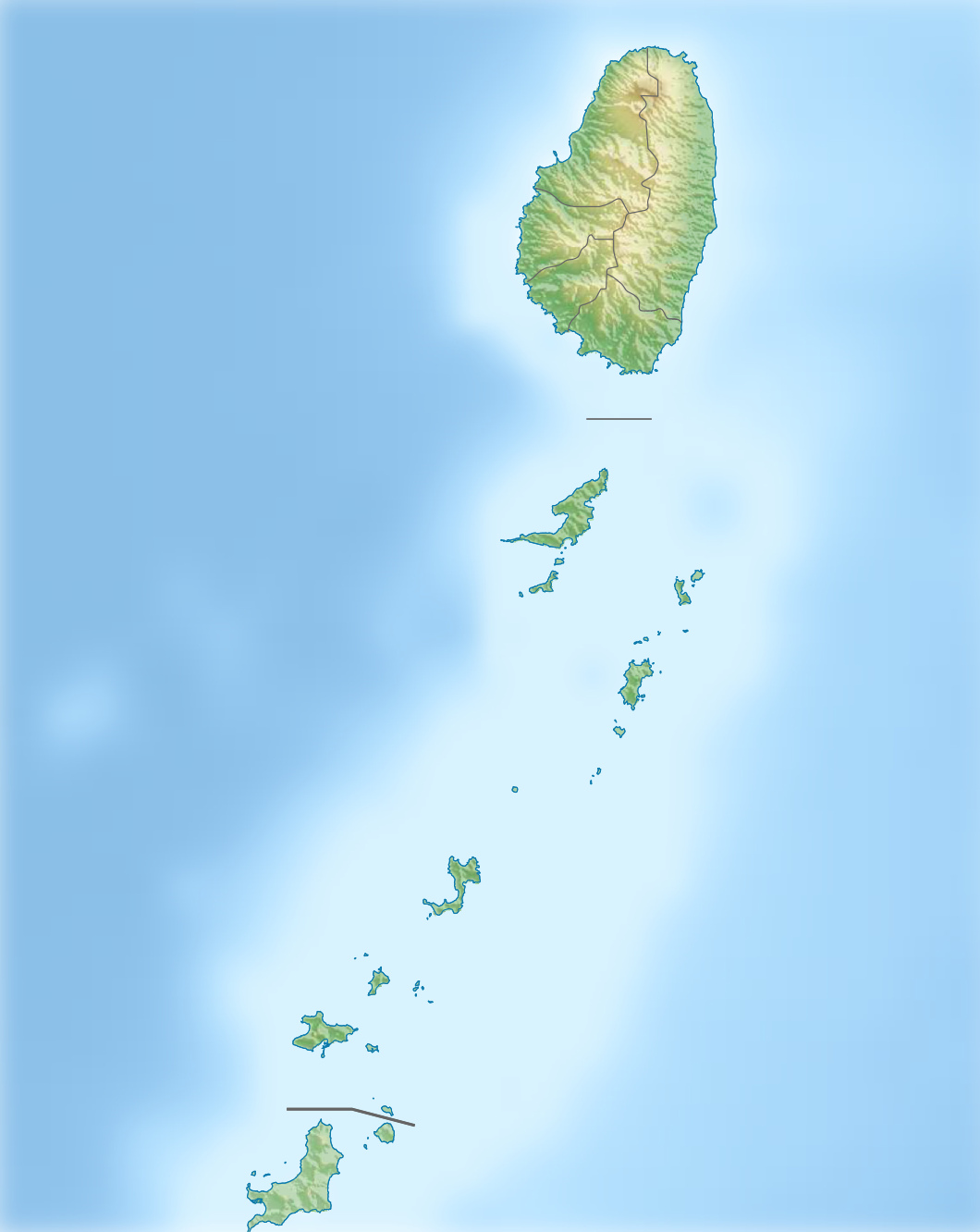
- Location in Saint Vincent and the Grenadines
- Coordinates: 12°35′45″N 061°25′07″W
- Country: Saint Vincent and the Grenadines
- Island: Union Island
- Parish: Grenadines
- Elevation: 11 m (35 ft)
- Time zone: UTC-04:00 (AST)

Clifton is a town located on Union Island, which is part of the Grenadines island chain of Saint Vincent and the Grenadines. It is located on the island's southeast coast.

== Transportation ==
Clifton is served by Union Island Airport.

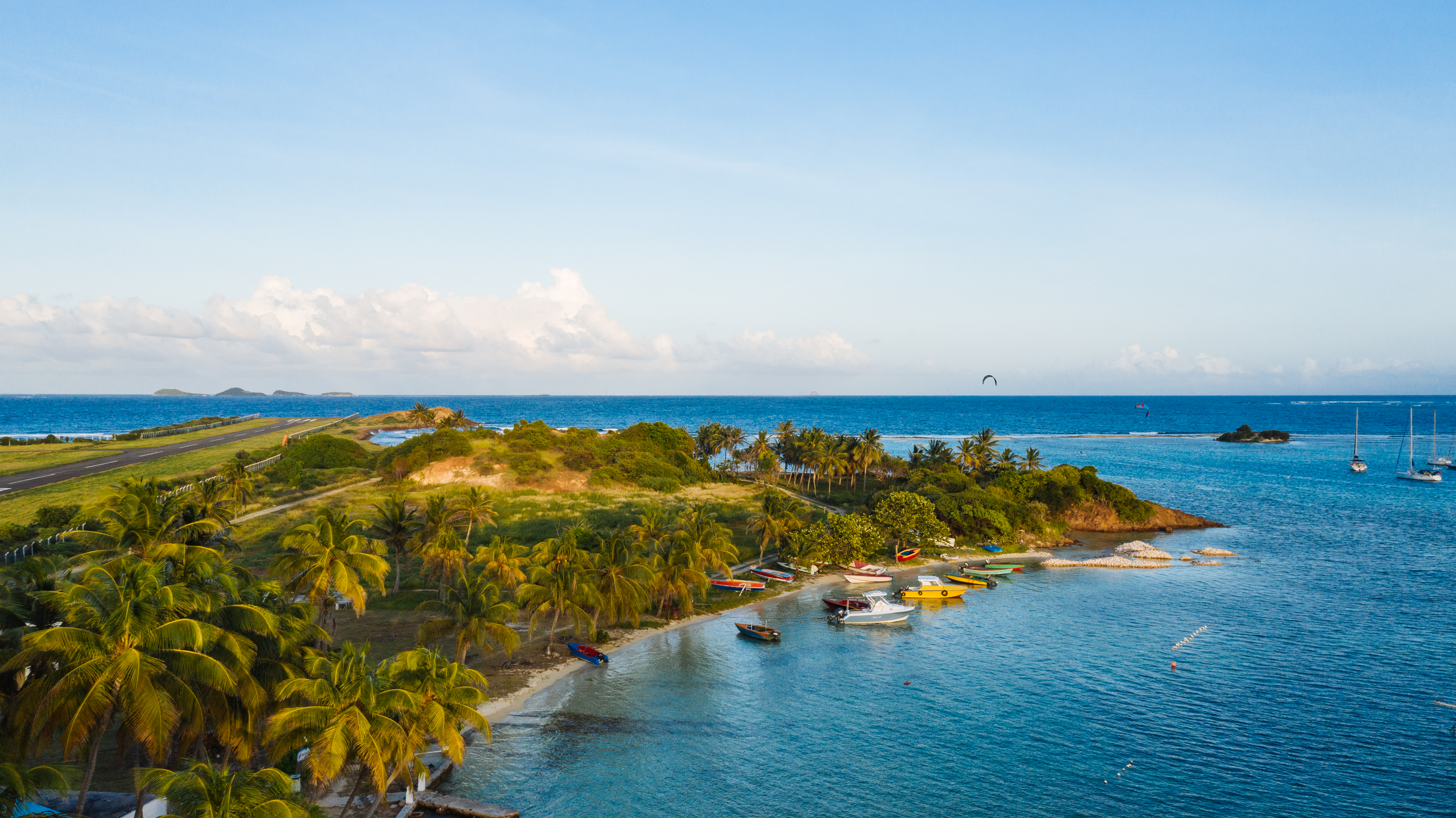
Aerial view of a beach on Union Island near Clifton with the Union Island Airport in the background.

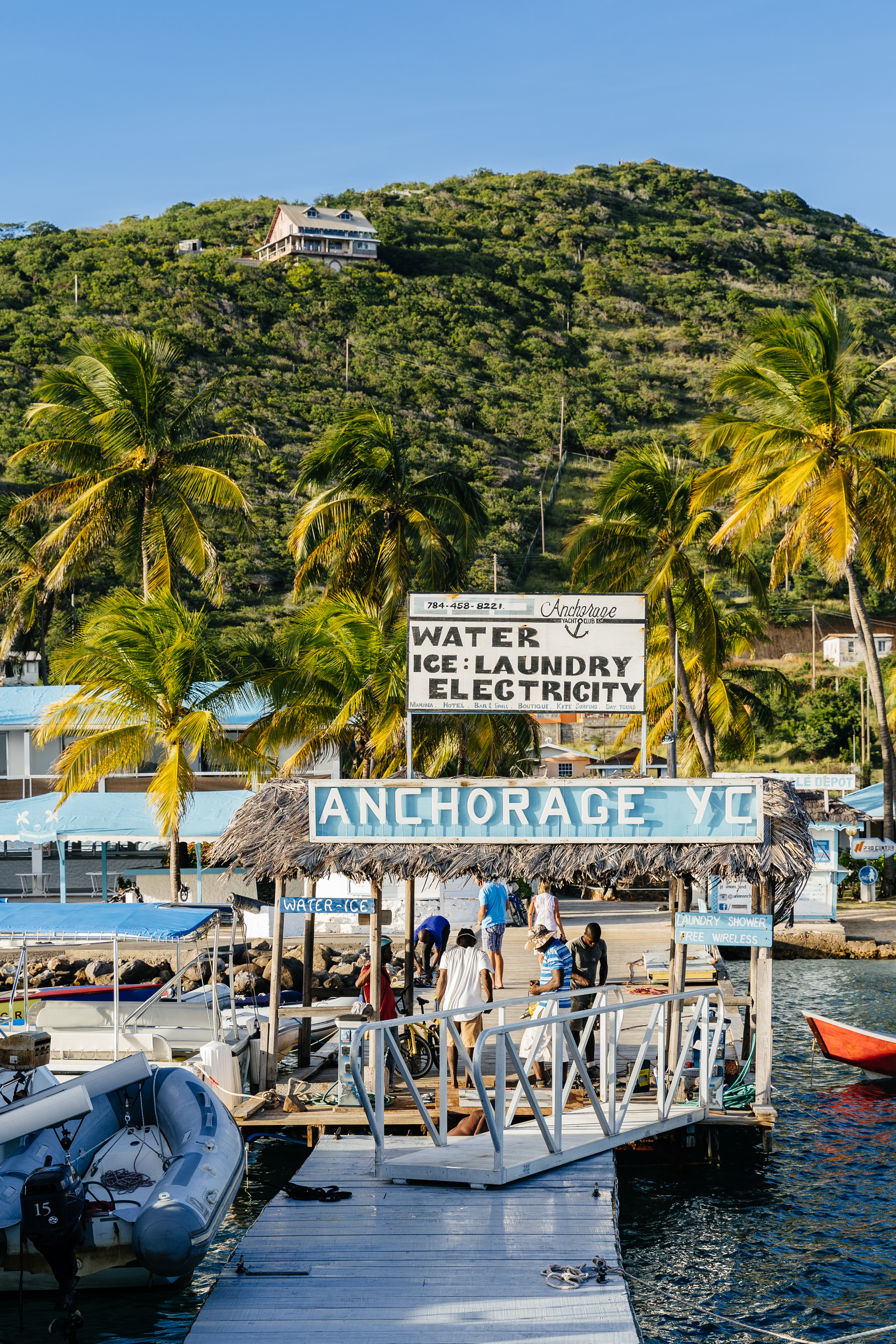
Harbour at Clifton, Union Island - Jetty of Anchorage Yacht Club

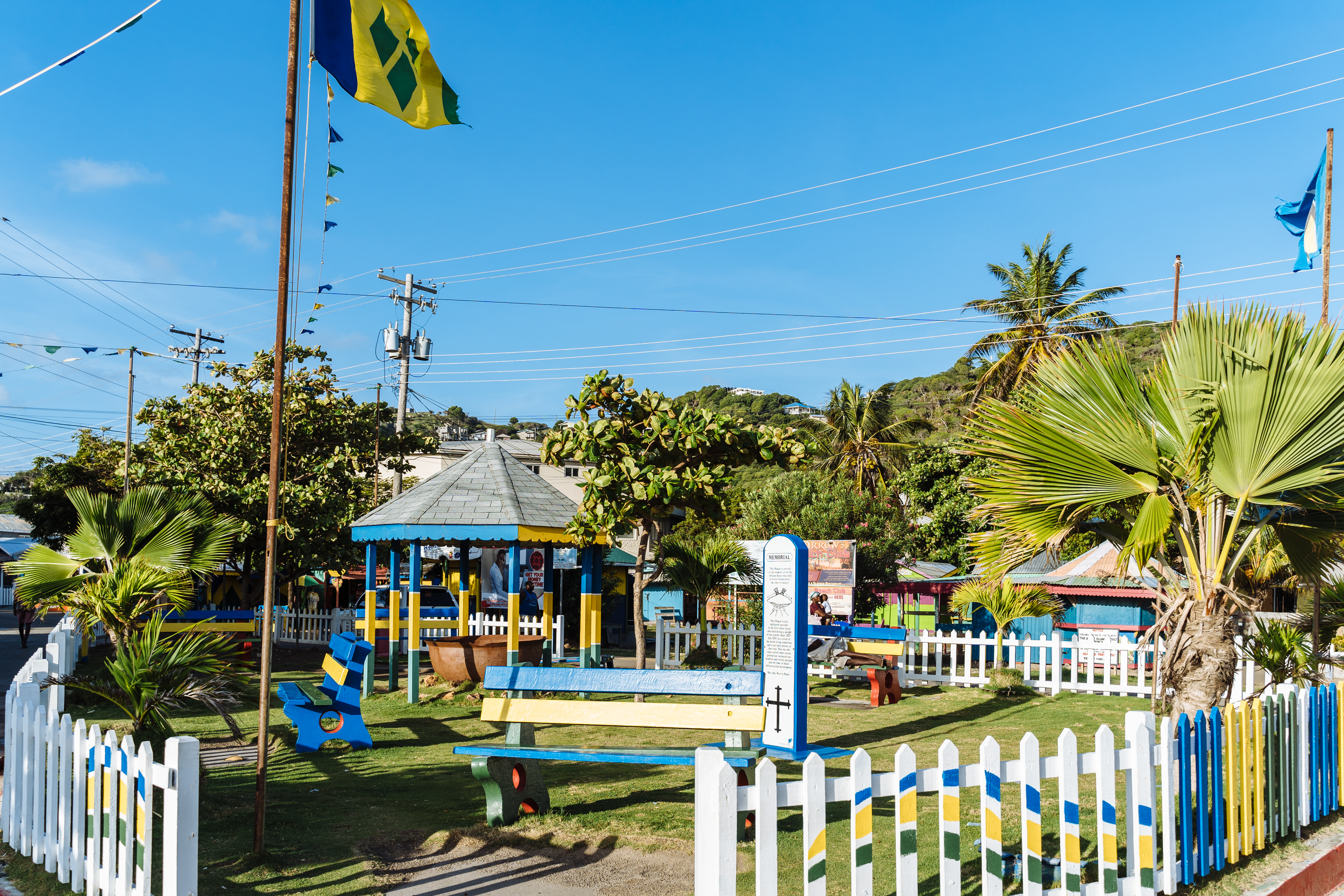
Memorial at central square of Clifton, Union Island.

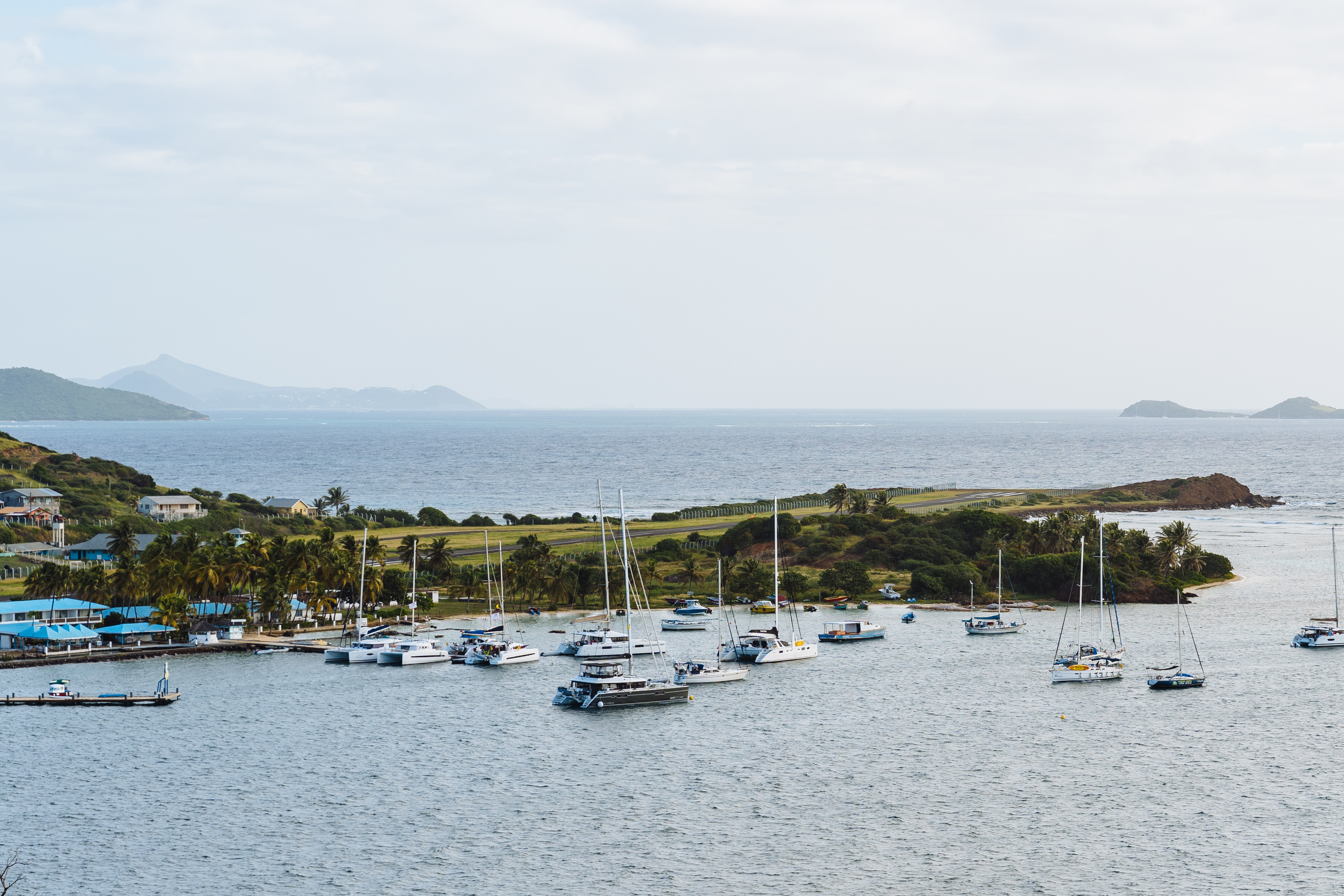
Union Island Airport in Clifton.
