= Union Island =

Island southwest of Saint Vincent

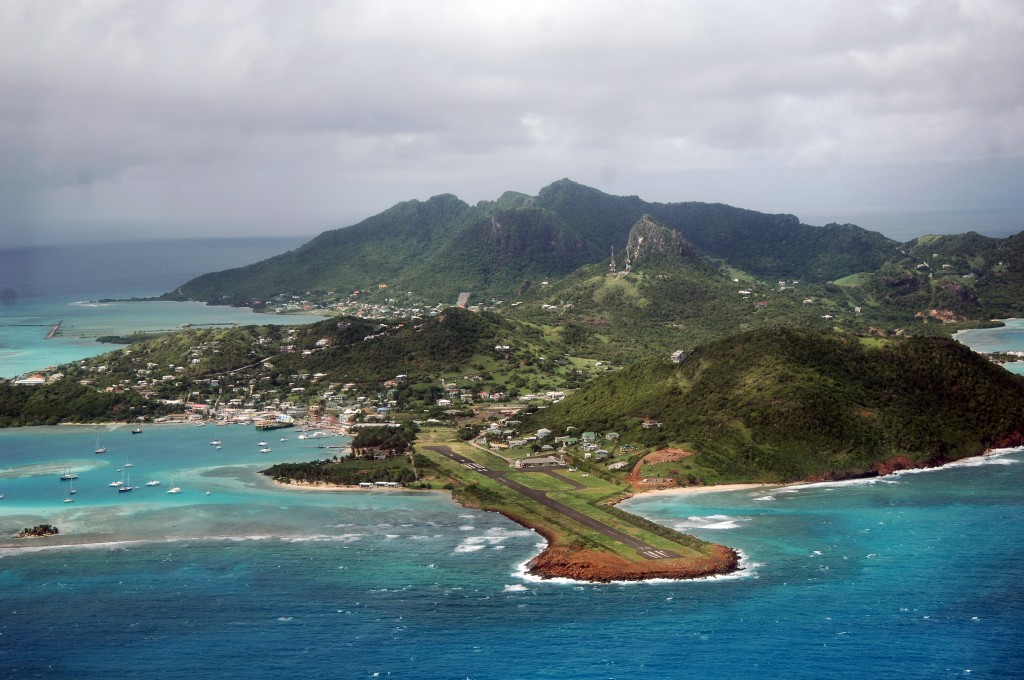
- Union Island International Airport from the air

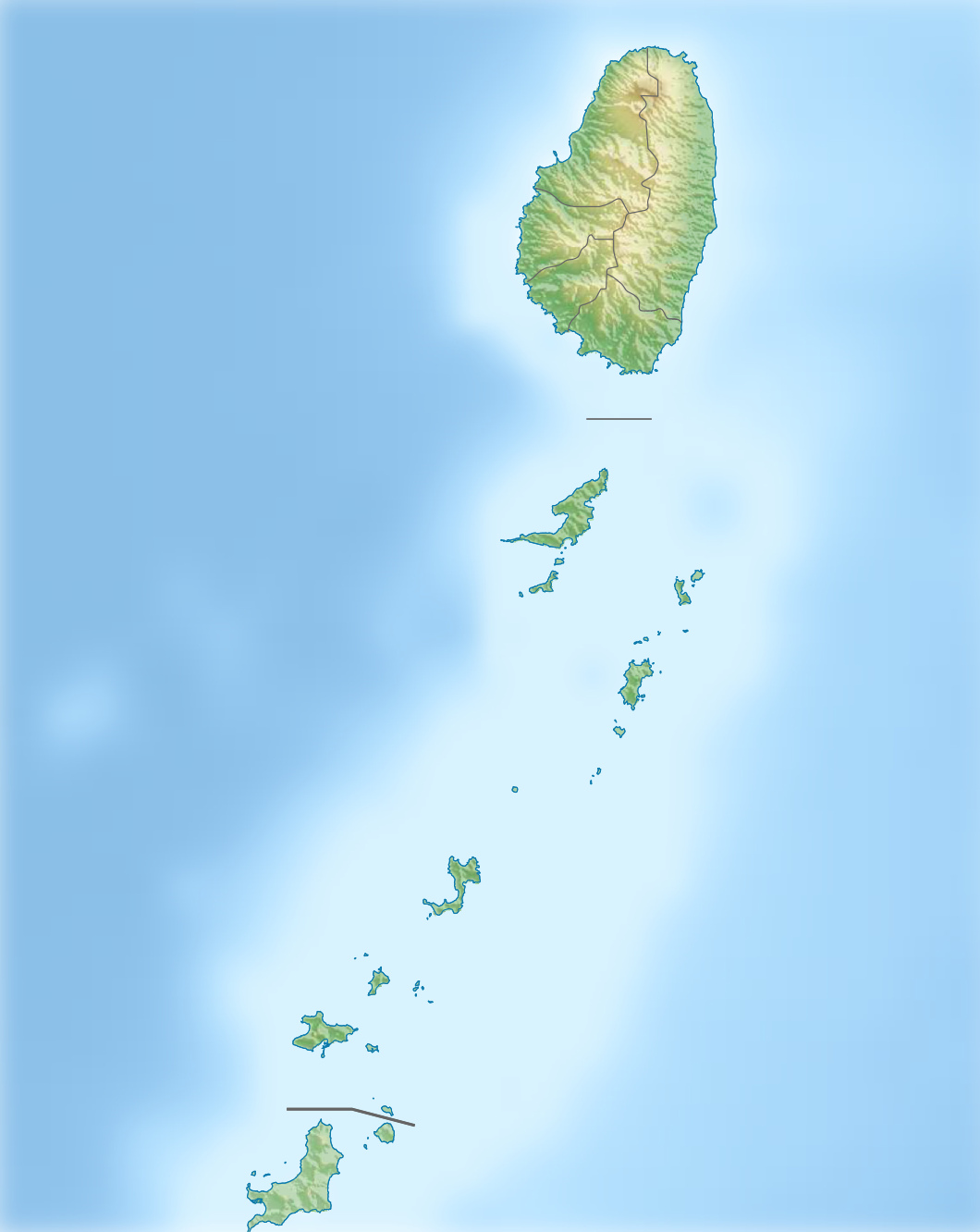
- Location within Saint Vincent and the Grenadines Location within Lesser Antilles Location within the Caribbean

Geography
- Location: Caribbean Sea
- Coordinates: 12°36′N 61°26′W
- Area: 3.5 sq mi (9.1 km^{2})
- Length: 3 mi (5 km)
- Width: 1 mi (2 km)
- Highest elevation: 999 ft (304.5 m)
- Highest point: Mount Taboi

Administration
- Saint Vincent and the Grenadines
- Largest settlement: Clifton

Demographics
- Population: ~ 3,000 (2012)
- Languages: English, French, German

Additional information
- Time zone: Eastern Caribbean (UTC-4)
- Official website: Travel guide of Union Island with street map of the town

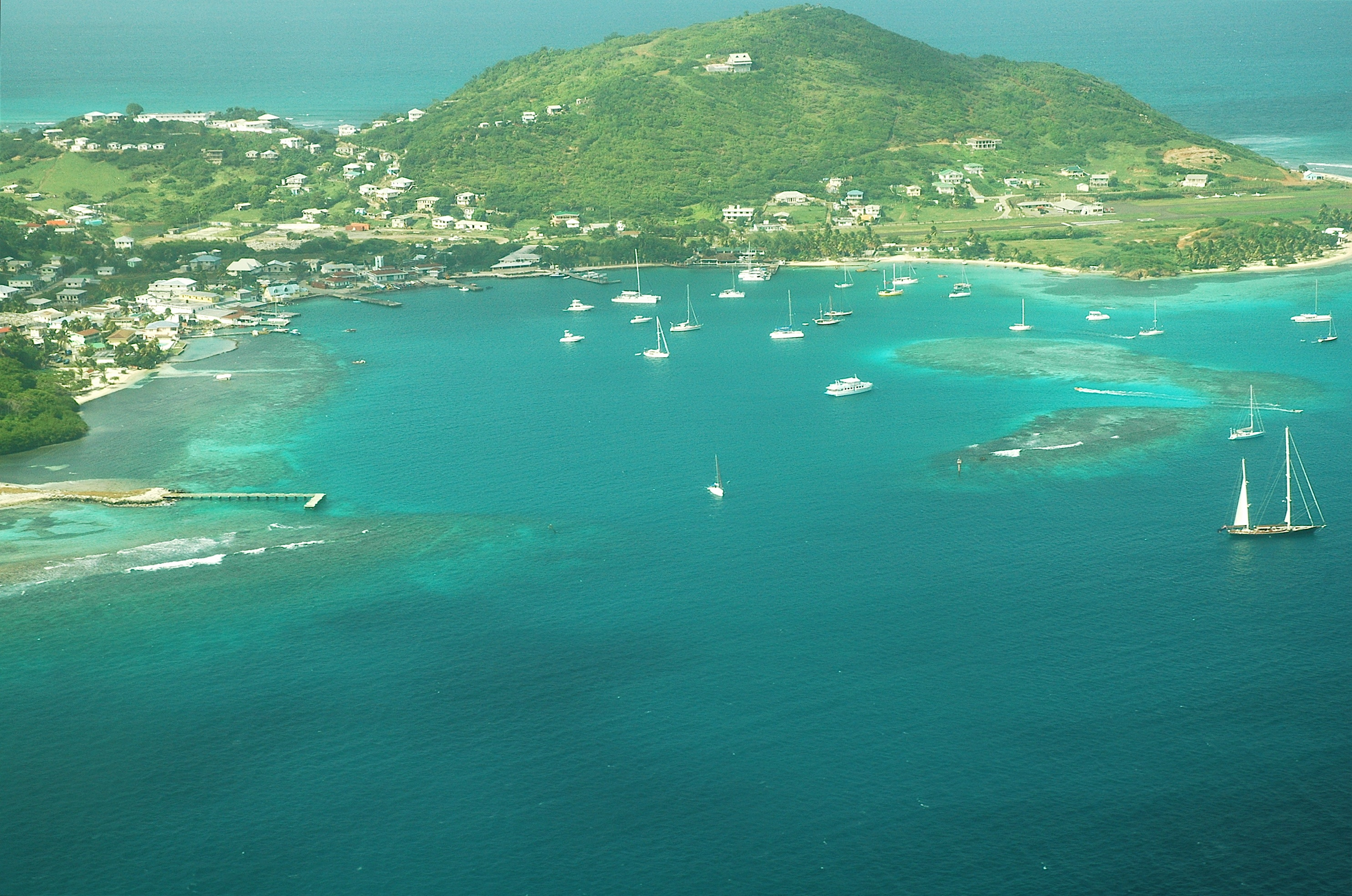
Clifton Harbour from the air

Union Island is part of the nation of Saint Vincent and the Grenadines. It has a surface of 9 square kilometres (3.5 sq mi) and lies about 200 km (120 miles) west-southwest of Barbados within view of the islands of Carriacou and the mainland of Grenada, which lies directly south.

Clifton and Ashton are the two principal towns. The island is home to just under 3,000 residents. The official language is English; however, French and German are spoken by some merchants in Clifton as well.

The island has an airport, Union Island Airport, with domestic flights to Saint Vincent and some of the Grenadines, as well as international flights to Barbados, Carriacou, Grenada and Martinique.

In July 2024, it was devastated by Hurricane Beryl, an extremely powerful hurricane, leaving majority of the island’s residents homeless and most of its infrastructure in ruins.

== Geography ==
Due to its volcanic silhouette, it is also called the Tahiti of the West Indies. The island is approximately three miles (4.8 kilometres) long and one mile (1.6 kilometres) wide. Surrounding islands are Tobago Cays, Mayreau, Palm Island, and Petit Saint Vincent. The highest peak is Mount Taboi, which is 999 feet (304 metres) above sea level.

Union Island has a semi-arid climate. Its hills are not high enough to produce the rainfall that transforms Grenada's northern coastal areas into rainforests. During the dry season (December to June), the only source of water on the island is the water stored during the rainy season (June to December).

== History ==
After the original settlers, the Arawak and Caribs, the island has been in the possession of French and English slave traders and plantation owners. They brought hundreds of Africans to the island, mostly from regions of Africa that are now Nigeria, Cameroon, Angola, and Ghana. Sea island cotton was an important export crop.

When slavery was abolished, people still relied on farming and fishing. As a result, a lot of men went to sea to work on freighters to support their families. Union Island was the centre of some political unrest in the late 1970s when a group of residents were in favor of secession from Saint Vincent and the Grenadines and merger with southern neighbors Grenada. The insurrection was put down by forces of the Saint Vincent and the Grenadines Government.

The U.S. Army Corps of Engineers spent much of a year working on Union Island and completed a new Coast Guard Jetty and shore office at the mouth of Clifton Harbor.

== Economy ==
Today the yacht services business and tourist day-chartering business provide many jobs. There are also numerous boutiques, supermarkets, bars, restaurants, internet cafes and, a dive operator.

There are several hotels and guest houses on Union Island, as well as schools, churches and a small health clinic.

The official currency is the Eastern Caribbean dollar (XCD), though U.S. dollars (USD) and euros (EUR) are widely accepted.

Telecommunications services are provided by Cable & Wireless, which offers landline and wireless services (GSM). Digicel offers competing for wireless services, including the network formerly operated by AT&T Wireless/Cingular. High-Speed Internet services are provided by Cable and Wireless (512 kbit/s down, 128 kbit/s up). The island is connected to the Saint Vincent mainland by a series of digital microwave towers (through connections to neighboring islands of Canouan and Bequia).

Wi-Fi service in the harbor is offered through Internet Cafe-Clifton. Also through Hohhot Spot, a service offered in Union through Erika's Marine Services, which is also offered in Bequia in the Grenadines, as well as Dominica and Antigua (both Falmouth and English Harbours and Jolly Harbour). Other computer and electronic support is also offered by The Internet Cafe — Clifton.

Local piers and docks earn money by renting their open space to tourists who have chartered sailboats or yachts, charging them by boat length.

In the middle of Clifton harbour sits Happy Island, a man-made island featuring a bar.

Ferry services operate between Clifton and Saint Vincent, Monday, Tuesday, Thursday, Friday and Saturday on the MS Barracouda and the MS Gemstar. Ferry services also operate bi-weekly between Ashton and Hillsborough, Carriacou (Grenada) on Mondays and Thursdays.

== Fauna ==
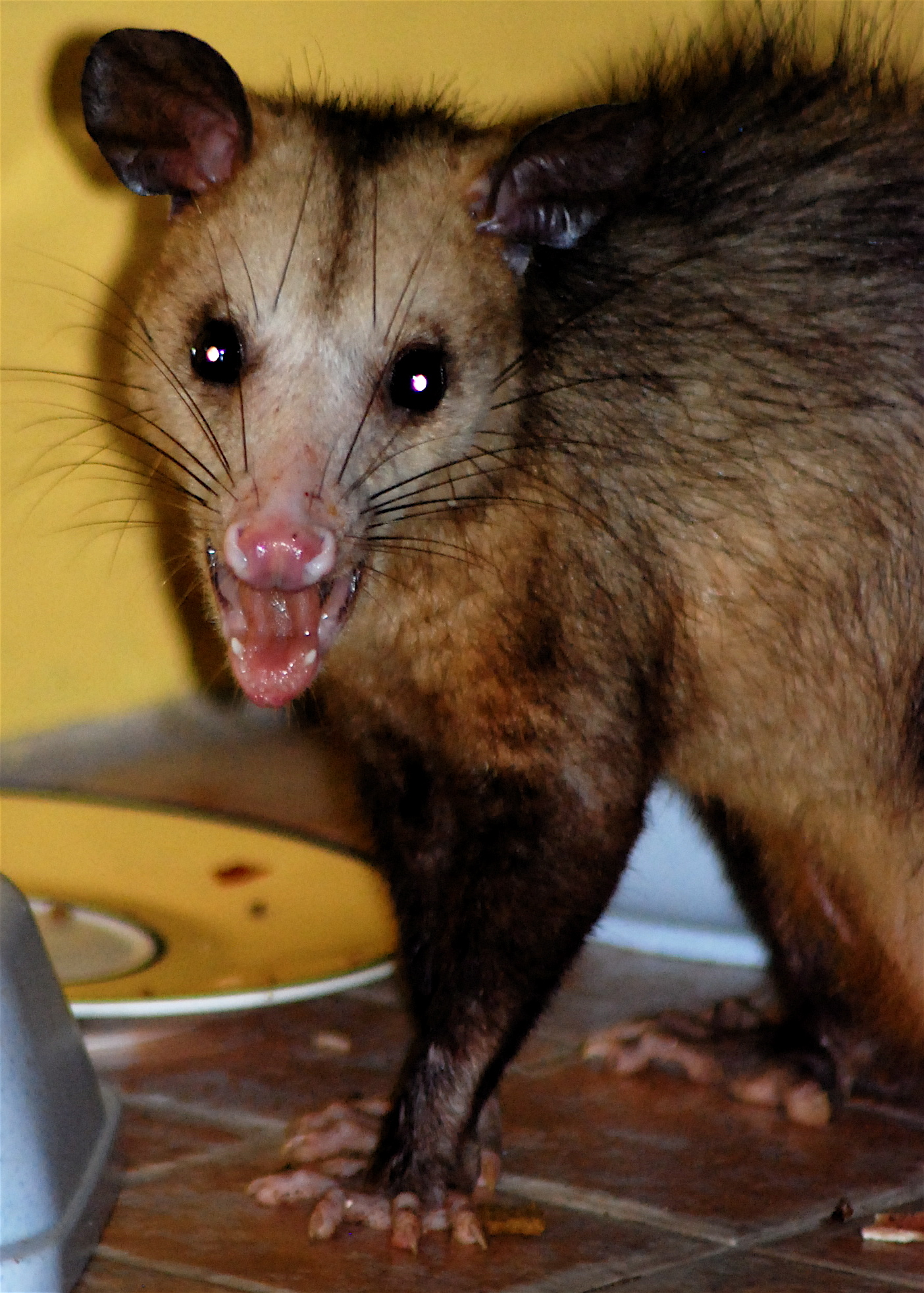
A manicou bares its teeth

The common opossum, locally known as "manicou", can usually be seen only at the end of the dry season. Common Caribbean birds like the bananaquit are found on the island, as is the ubiquitous blackbird. A 2006 book on the fauna of Mustique, a neighboring island, is a notable reference. The Union Island gecko, discovered in 2005 is endemic to the island and is currently listed as critically endangered by the International Union for Conservation of Nature.

== Tourism ==
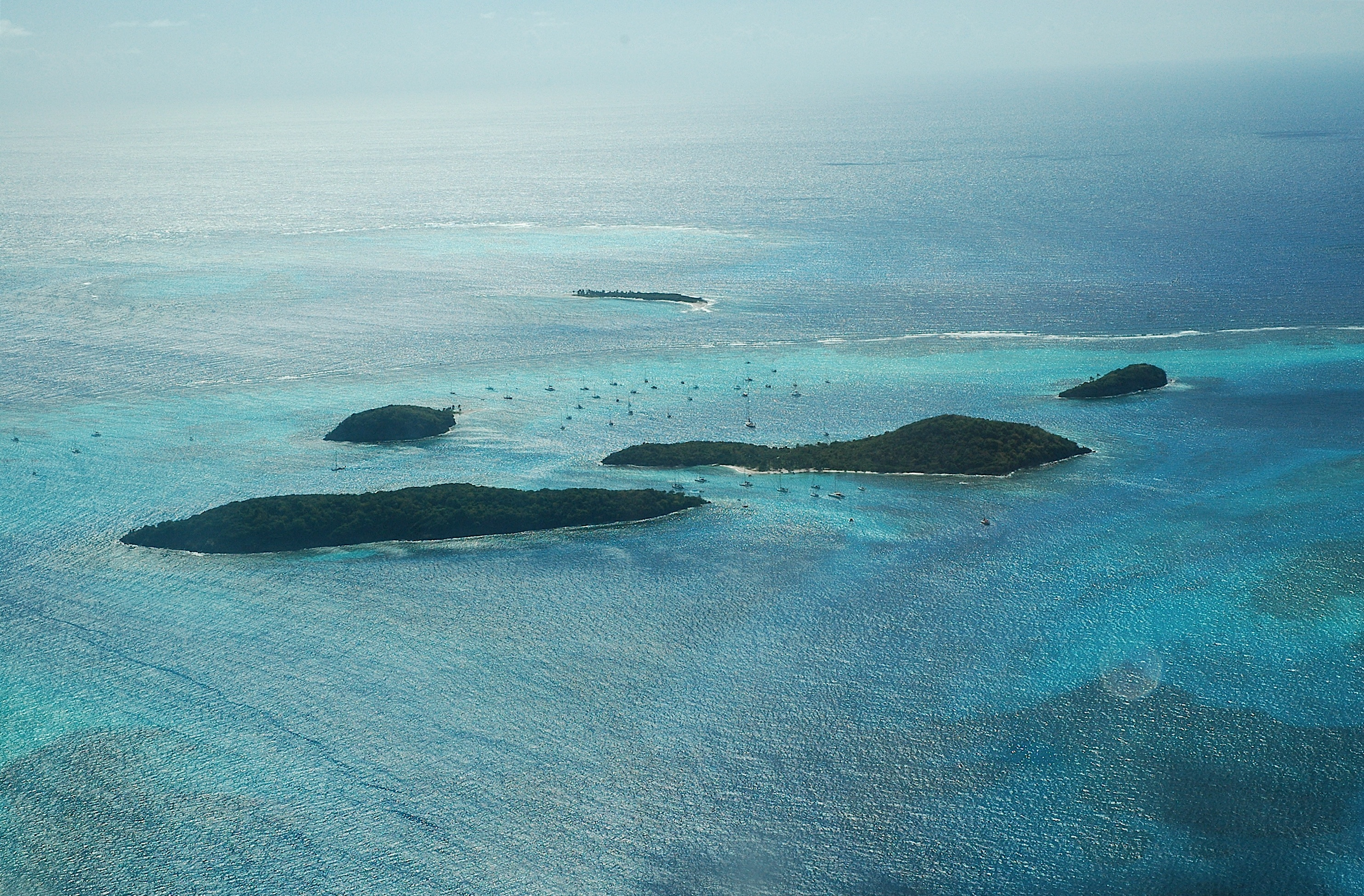
Aerial view of the Tobago Cays Marine Park

The tourism industry plays an increasing role in Union Island's economy. A large number of yachts visit the island each year, often on their way to the nearby Tobago Cays. There are a number of local guest houses, including St. Joseph's Roman Catholic Church, the Anchorage Yacht Club, and a small hotel at the Bougainville in Clifton.

Turtle watching is conducted by the Union Island Environmental Attackers (UIEA), an environmental non-governmental organization seeking to preserve Union Island. Turtle watching occurs during the Turtle Closed Season (March 1 to July 31), during which time catching or killing of turtles for consumption is forbidden.

There are also a number of bars and restaurants on the island.

Chatham Bay, on the west side of the island, is popular for its remote beach and snorkeling.

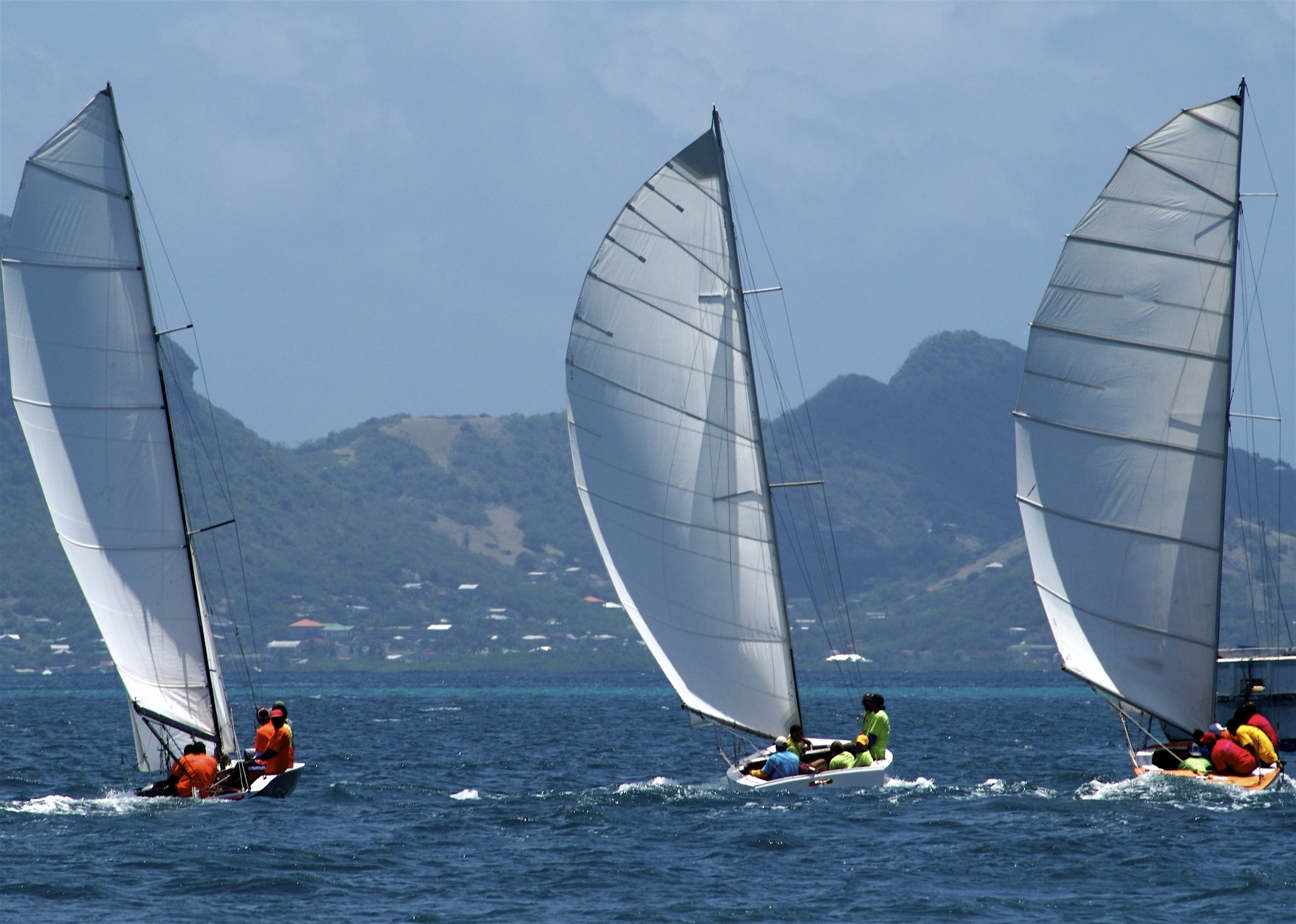
Local sailboats compete in regatta, Union Island in background

A key feature of the Union Island region is the Tobago Cays National Marine Park. The Tobago Cays are a group of small, uninhabited islands surrounded by reefs. Snorkeling, scuba diving and swimming with sea turtles are offered.

The Union Island Sailing Club sponsors two sailing dinghies that participate in local regatta.

== Culture ==
The culture of Union Island reflects the laid-back atmosphere of the Caribbean. The island is home to a diverse population, including descendants of African slaves, indigenous Caribs, and people of European and East Indian descent. This multicultural mix has shaped the cultural fabric of Union Island.

One of the most prominent aspects of Union Island's culture is its music. Calypso, reggae, and soca music are popular genres that can be heard throughout the island. Music plays a significant role in local celebrations, festivals, and social gatherings, providing a rhythmic backdrop to daily life.

Carnival is a popular event on Union Island. The festival takes place annually and involves parades, music, and traditional dance performances. The Carnival season is known as an opportunity for locals and visitors alike to come together to celebrate.

The cuisine of Union Island is another reflection of its culture. The island offers a delectable array of dishes influenced by African, Indian, and Creole culinary traditions. Fresh seafood, tropical fruits, and locally sourced ingredients are often incorporated into traditional recipes, creating flavorful and distinctive meals.

Easter is one of the biggest events on Union Island. Festivities take place in both Ashton and Clifton throughout Holy Week in a festival called "Easterly".

In late May, at the end of the dry season, a significant event is "the Maroon", a celebration which is a day-long event beginning before dawn and lasting late into the night. The Maroon is known for its drums, dancing and plentiful food. These are meant to entice the Gods to bring on the rains.

== Gallery ==
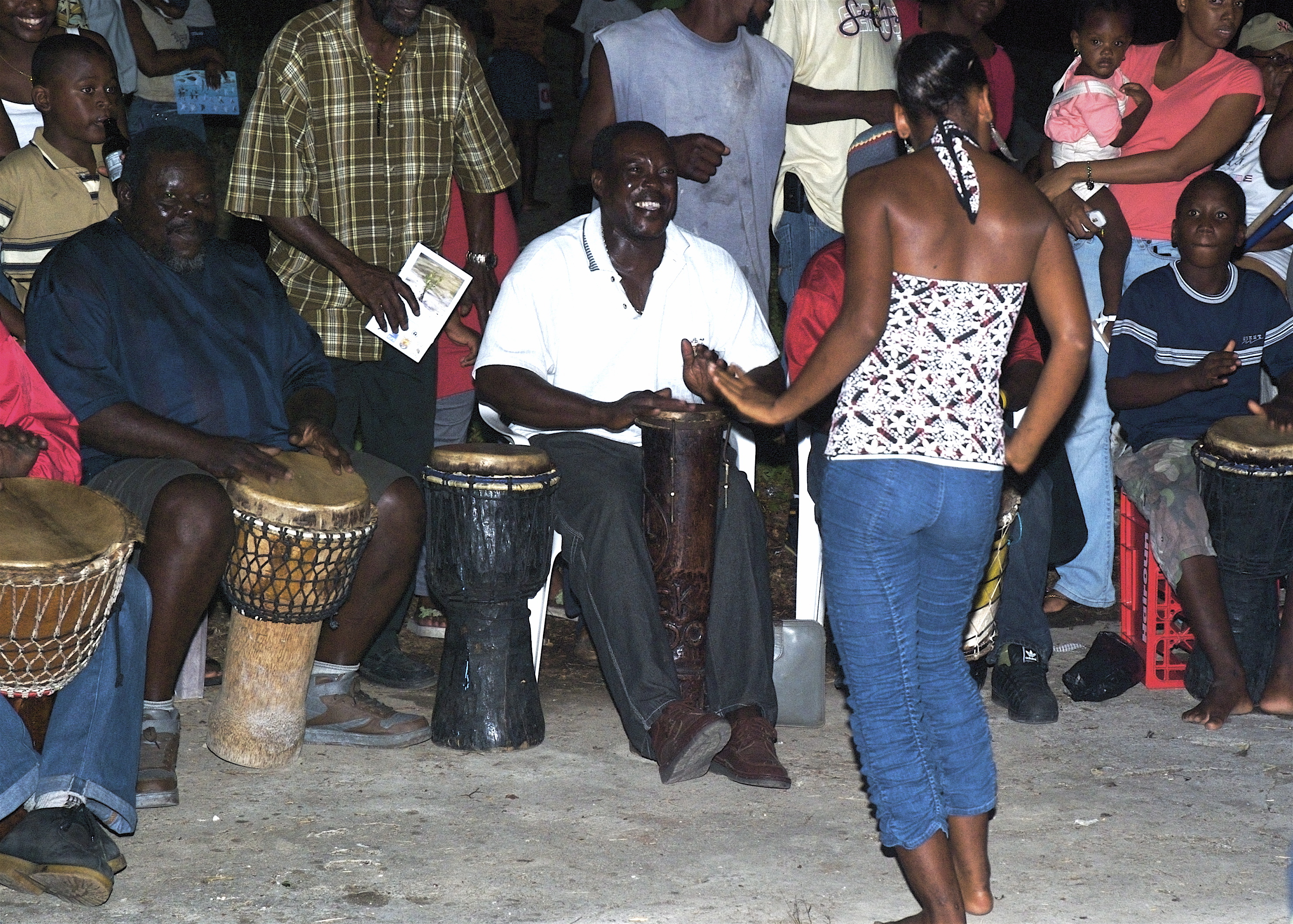
Maroon celebration in Ashton, May 2007

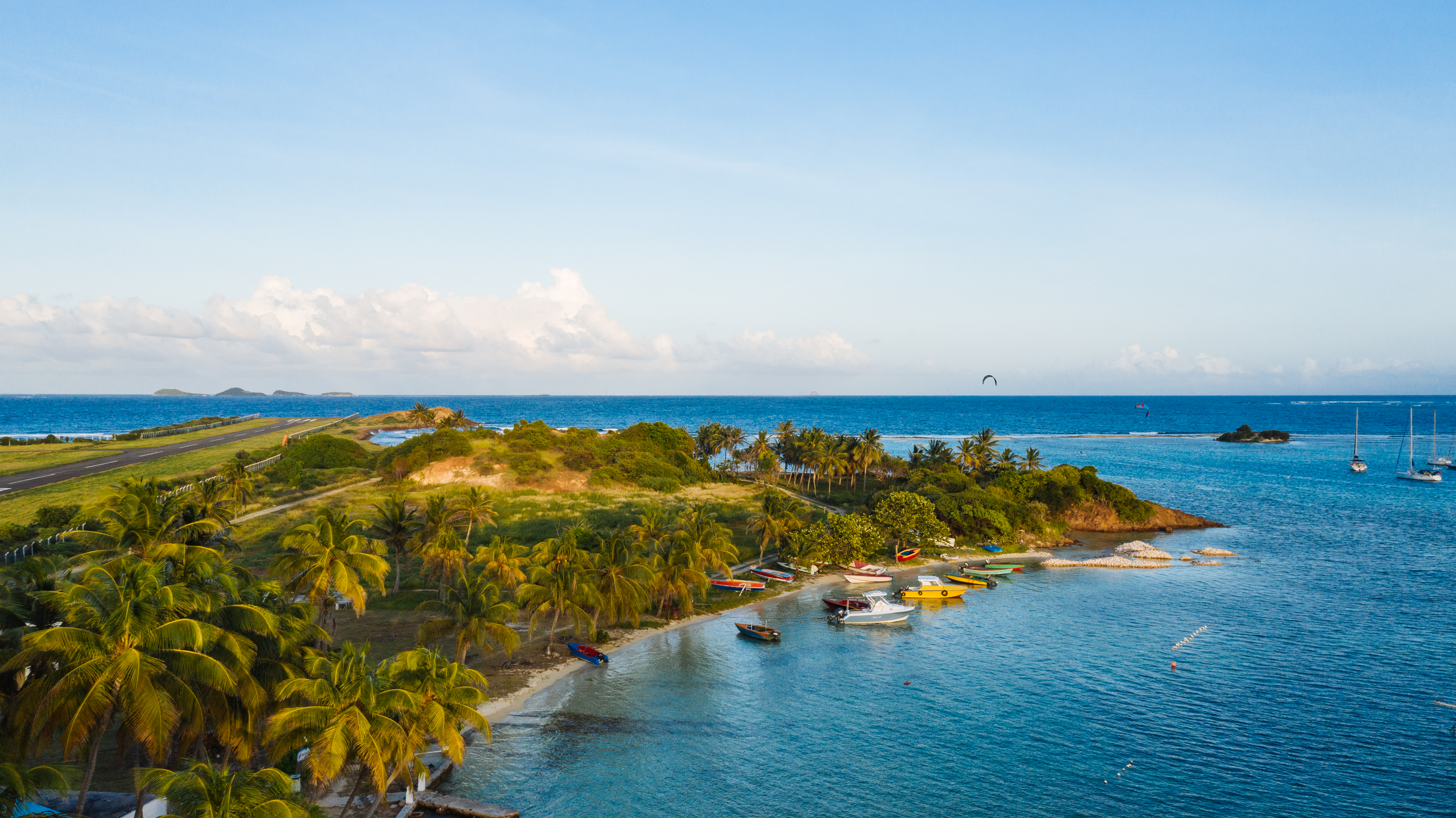
Areal view of a beach on Union Island near Clifton with the Union Island Airport in the background.

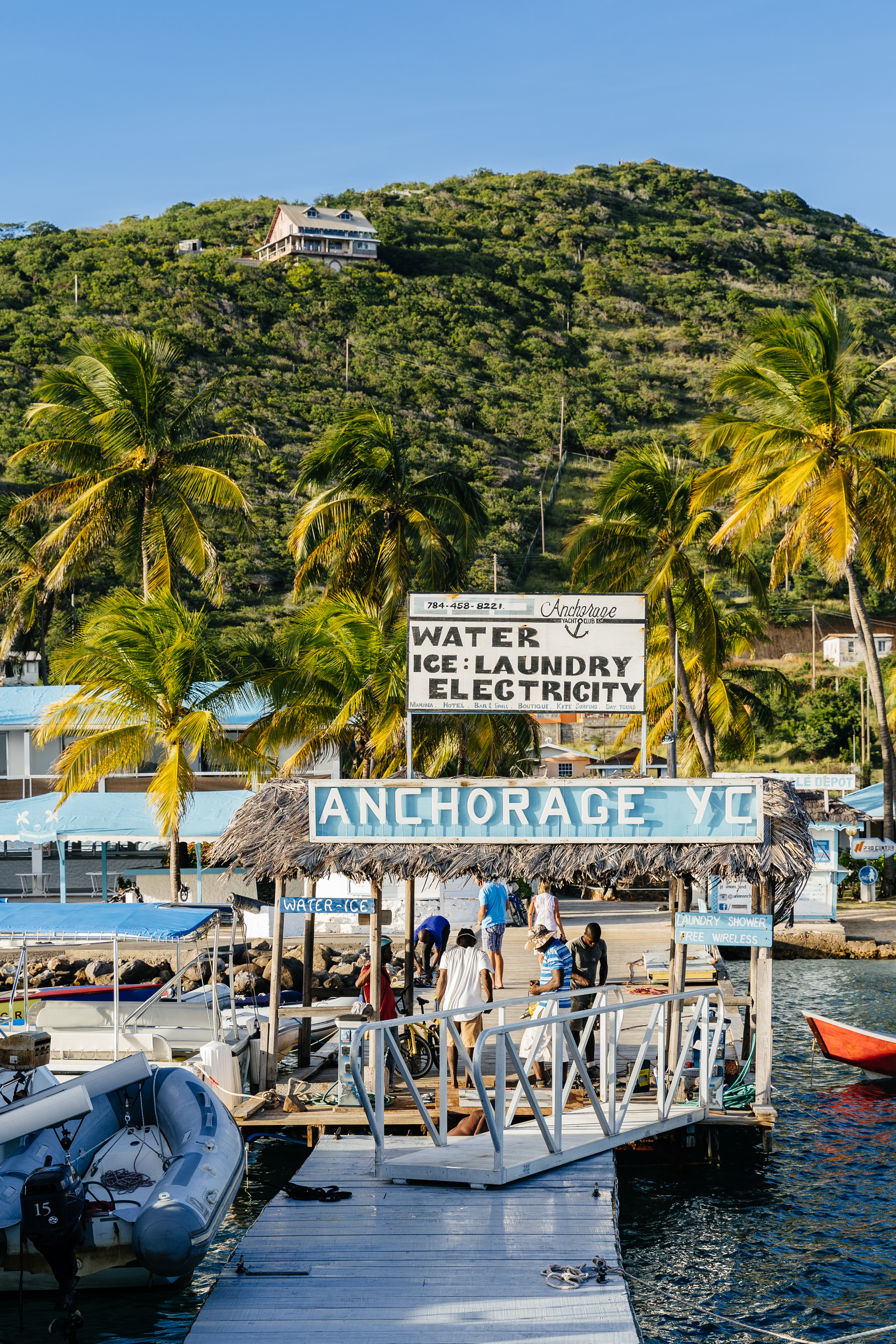
Harbour at Clifton, Union Island - Jetty of Anchorage Yacht Club

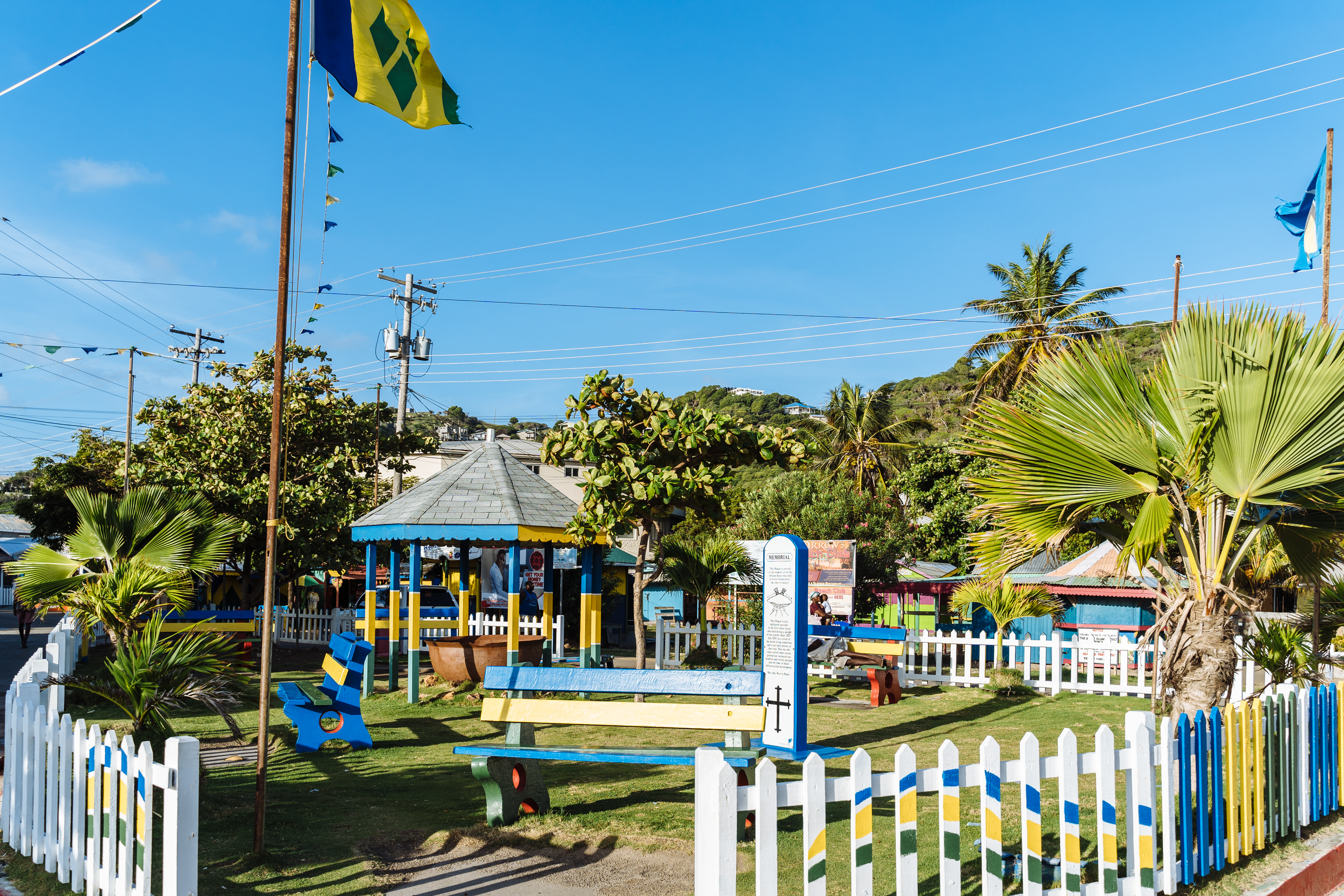
Memorial at central square of Clifton, Union Island.

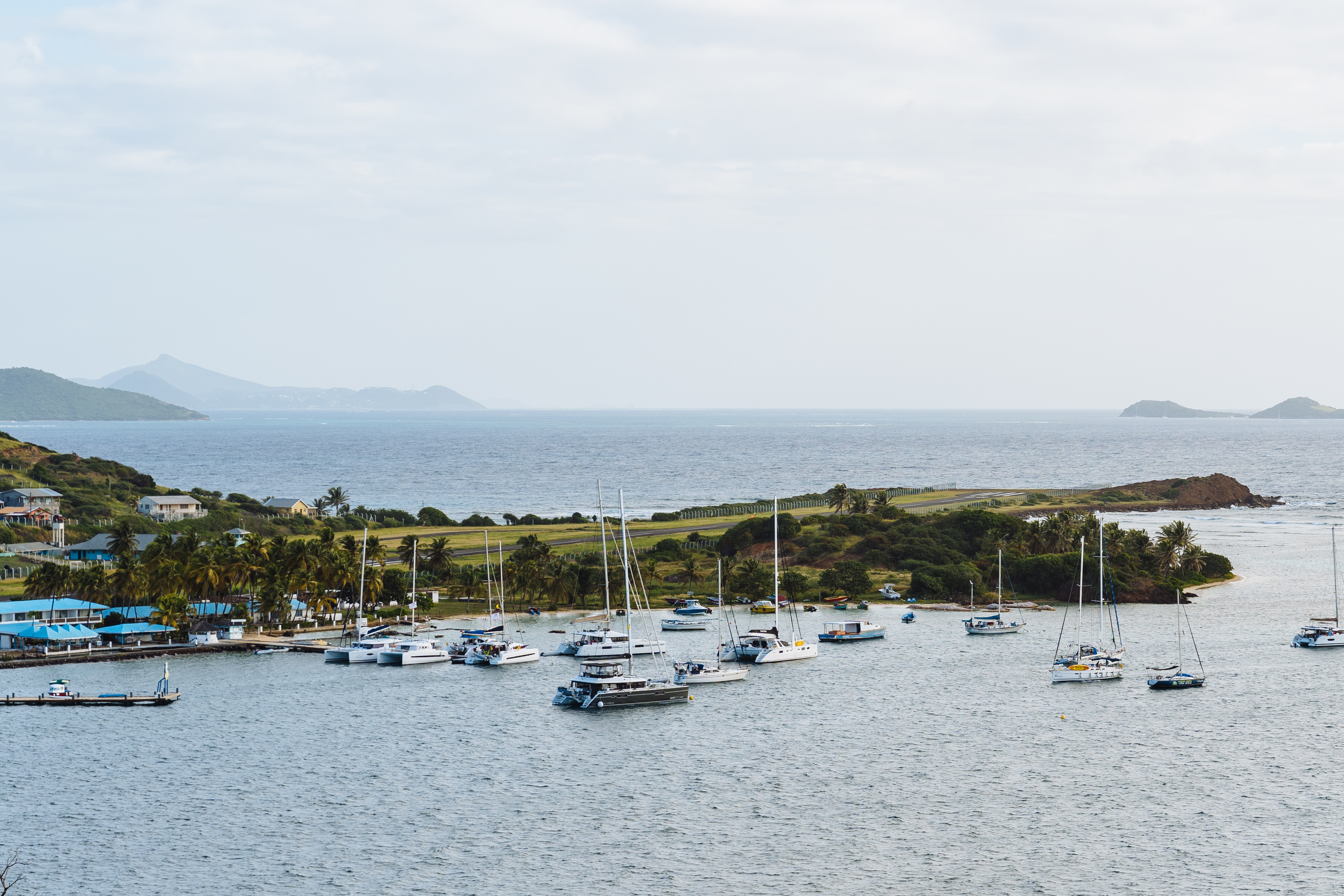
Union Island Airport in Clifton.

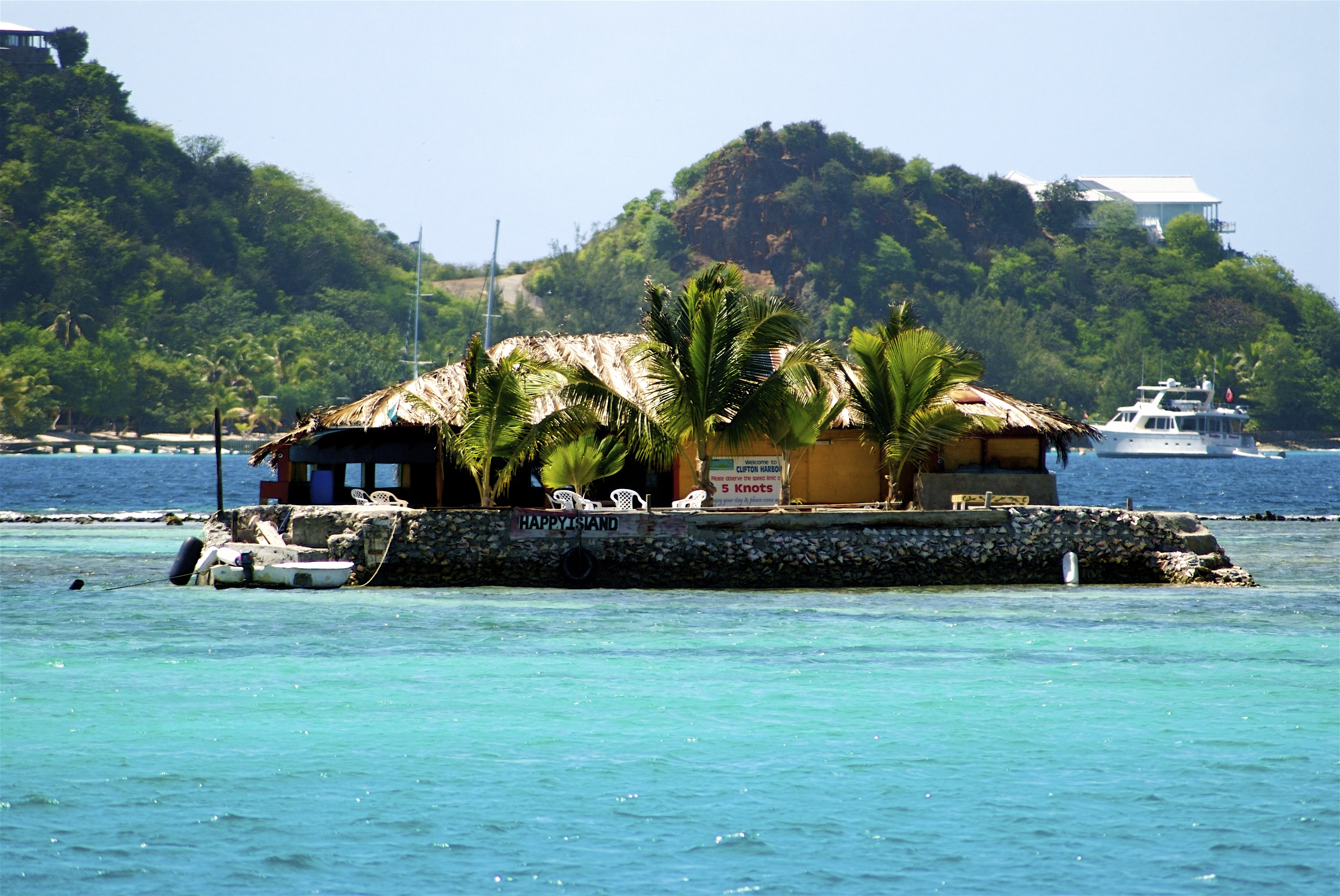
Happy Island sits in the outer harbour of Clifton, Union Island

== See also ==
- Union Island - a West Indiaman that sailed between 1794 and 1821
