= Grenadines Parish =

Grenadines
- Parish
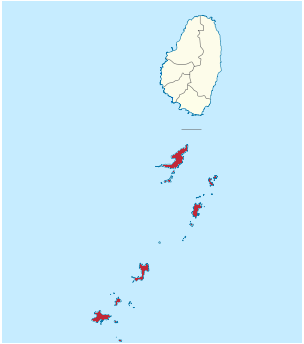
- Coordinates: 13°01′N 061°14′W
- Country: Saint Vincent and the Grenadines
- Capital City: Port Elizabeth

Area
  - Total: 17 sq mi (44 km^{2})
- Elevation: 999 ft (304 m)

Population
  - Total: 9,200

Grenadines is an administrative parish of Saint Vincent and the Grenadines, comprising the islands of the Grenadines other than those belonging to Grenada. The capital is Port Elizabeth. It's the only parish in the country that's not located on the main island.

- Area: 44 km² (17 mi²)
- Population: 9,200 (2000 estimates)

== Islands ==
The parish includes the northern Grenadine Islands:

- All Awash Island (12°55′N 061°08′W)
- Baliceaux (Baliceaux Island, 12°57′N 061°08′W)
- Battowia (Battowia Island, 12°58′N 061°08′W)
- Bequia (13°01′N 061°13′W)
- Canouan (Canouan Island, 12°43′N 061°20′W)
- Catholic Island (12°40′N 061°24′W)
- Church Cay (12°57′N 061°08′W)
- Dove Cay (12°41′N 061°21′W)
- L'Islot (12°41′N 061°21′W)
- Mayreau (12°39′N 061°23′W)
- Mustique (12°53′N 061°11′W)
- Petit Canouan (12°47′N 061°17′W)
- Petit Cay (12°50′N 061°12′W)
- Petit Mustique (12°51′N 061°12′W)
- Petit Nevis (12°58′N 061°15′W)
- Petit Saint Vincent (12°32′N 061°23′W)
- Pigeon Island (12°57′N 061°17′W)
- Prune Island (Palm Island, 12°35′N 061°24′W)
- Quatre (Isle à Quatre, 12°57′N 061°15′W)
- Rabbit Island (12°51′N 061°10′W)
- Red Island (12°36′N 061°25′W)
- Saint Elairs Cay (12°59′N 061°14′W)
- Sand Cay (12°36′N 061°26′W)
- Savan (Savan Island, 12°48′N 061°12′W)
- The Pillories (Les Piloris, 12°54′N 061°10′W)
- Tobago Cays (12°38′N 061°21′W)
- Union Island (12°36′N 061°26′W)

== Populated places ==
The following populated places are located in the parish of Grenadine:

Name	Coordinates	Island
Ashton	12°35′41″N 061°26′05″W	Union Island
Bednoe	12°57′N 061°15′W	Quatre
Charlestown	12°42′03″N 061°19′53″W	Canouan
Cheltenham	12°53′N 061°11′W	Mustique
Clifton	12°35′45″N 061°25′07″W	Union Island
Derrick	12°59′N 061°15′W	Bequia
Dovers	12°53′N 061°11′W	Mustique
Friendship	12°59′32″N 061°14′10″W	Bequia
Lovell Village	12°52′57″N 061°11′16″W	Mustique
Old Wall	12°38′19″N 061°23′38″W	Mayreau
Paget Farm	12°59′17″N 061°15′11″W	Bequia
Port Elizabeth	13°00′40″N 061°14′04″W	Bequia
