= Carriacou and Petite Martinique =

Dependency of Grenada

Carriacou and Petite Martinique Carriacou et Petite Martinique
- Dependency of Grenada
- Location of Carriacou and Petite Martinique
- Part of British Grenada: 1763
- Constituency: 1944
- Part of Grenada: February 7, 1974
- Capital and largest city: Hillsborough; 12°28.9′N 61°27.5′W
- Official languages: English; Grenadian Creole French
- Demonym(s): Carriacouan; Petit Martiniquian

Government
  - Monarch: King Charles III
  - Governor General: Cécile La Grenade
  - Prime Minister: Dickon Mitchell
  - Member of Parliament: Tevin Andrews
  - Minister for Carriacou and Petite Martinique Affairs: Tevin Andrews

Area
  - Total: 37.7 km^{2} (14.6 sq mi)

Population
  - Estimate: 6,081
- Currency: East Caribbean dollar (XCD)
- Time zone: UTC−4
  - Summer (DST): UTC−4
- ISO 3166 code: GD-10
- Internet TLD: .gd
- The main patois (or Creole) language is French-based.

Map of Carriacou and Petite Martinique

Carriacou and Petite Martinique, also known as the Southern Grenadines, is a dependency (part) of Grenada, lying north of Grenada island and south of Saint Vincent and the Grenadines in the Lesser Antilles.

Carriacou Island is the largest island of the Grenadines, an archipelago in the Windward Islands chain. The island is 13 square miles (34 km^{2}) with a population of 9,595 (2019 census). The main settlements on the island are Hillsborough, L'Esterre, Harvey Vale, and Windward.

The neighbouring island of Petite Martinique is 2.5 miles (2.2 nmi) away from Carriacou, and also a part of Grenada. With its 586 acres (2.37 km^{2}) and population of 900, it is smaller than Carriacou. Carriacou and Petite Martinique are known for its Regatta and Village Maroon.

== Colonial history ==
On 27 September 1650, Jacques du Parquet bought Grenada from the Compagnie des Iles de l'Amerique, which was dissolved, for the equivalent of £1160. In 1657, Jacques du Parquet sold Grenada to Jean de Faudoas, Comte de Sérillac, for the equivalent of £1890. In 1664, King Louis XIV bought out the independent island owners and established the French West India Company. In 1674, the French West India Company was dissolved. Proprietary rule ended in Grenada, which became a French crown colony as a dependency of Martinique.

Carriacou and Petite Martinique was part of the French colony in 1762. It was part of the British Grenada colony from 1763 to 1779 and 1783–1974. It was part of the French Grenada colony from 1779 to 1783. During this turbulent period, most of the land on Carriacou and all of the property on Petite Martinique was owned by a free black woman, Judith Philip, and her family members. It has been a dependency of Grenada since 1974.

== Geography ==
Carriacou is the largest of the Grenadines and is characterized by hilly terrain sloping to white sand beaches. The island stretches from Pegus Point in the south to Gun Point in the north and it is about 7 miles (11 km) long.

The island has several natural harbors and many coral reefs and small offshore islets.

The highest point on the island is High Point North at 955 feet (291 m) above sea level. Carriacou has no rivers. Residents rely on rainfall for their water.

=== Islands ===
Name	Area	Population
Carriacou	34 km^{2} (13 sq mi)	9,595
Petite Martinique	2.37 km^{2} (0.92 sq mi)	900
Large Island	0.50 km^{2} (0.19 sq mi)	none
Frigate Island	0.40 km^{2} (0.15 sq mi)	none
Saline Island	0.30 km^{2} (0.12 sq mi)	none

=== Climate ===
There are two seasons, wet and dry. The dry season is between January and June when the trade winds dominate the climate; the rainy season is from July to December. The climate is tropical. Temperatures range from 27–32 °C (81–90 °F) on land, with 26–30 °C (79–86 °F) water temps.

== Politics ==
Carriacou and Petite Martinique is a Grenadian Constituency. Tevin Andrews, NDC, is the representative for Carriacou and Petite Martinique Constituency and also the Minister of Carriacou and Petite Martinique Affairs. The Grenadian constitution of 1974 guarantees a right to autonomy and local government for Carriacou and Petite Martinique, but this has never been implemented. In 2022, the government of Dickon Mitchell introduced a bill to parliament to establish a local Council for Carriacou and Petite Martinique.

== Festivals ==
There are four major cultural festivals held on Carriacou and one on Petite Martinique. Carriacou Carnival, called "Kayak Mas", is held during the days leading up to Lent in late February or early March. The Carriacou Regatta, held on the first weekend in August, is a racing event for locally built boats. The Regatta began in 1965, making it the longest running regatta in the Caribbean. The Parang, on the weekend prior to Christmas, celebrates the island's traditional Christmas music and culture. Village Maroons take place year round, and involve villagers partaking in cooking traditional foods and the "Big Drum Dance". The Carriacou Maroon & String Band Music Festival is held in the last weekend of April of the year. Petite Martinique's Whitsuntide Regatta Festival takes place annually on Whitsuntide weekend, and consists of boat races, performances, and other activities.

== Transport ==
Carriacou and Petite Martinique's main transport system includes roads and ferries. The people of Carriacou travel mainly by privately run 15 seater buses. Rental cars and taxis are also available and boats are commonplace. Lauriston Airport, located in Lauriston, Carriacou, is the island's major airport, and a small ferry boat known as the Osprey runs between Carriacou, Grenada, and Petite Martinique. The short distances between the Grenadines also enable travel between them by small boats.

== Radio stations ==
- KYAK106.com Carriacou's Home Grown Radio Station.
- The Harbour Light of the Windwards is a local Christian radio station.
- Sister Isles – 92.9 FM

== See also ==
- Rough Science, a BBC documentary television series made in Carriacou
- List of Caribbean islands
