= Derrick, Saint Vincent and the Grenadines =

Derrick
- Location in Saint Vincent and the Grenadines
- Coordinates: 12°59′N 061°15′W
- Country: Saint Vincent and the Grenadines
- Island: Bequia
- Parish: Grenadines

Derrick is a town located on the island of Bequia, which is part of the Grenadines island chain.

== See also ==
- Saint Vincent and the Grenadines
