= Petit Canouan =

Island of Saint Vincent and the Grenadines

Petite Canouan
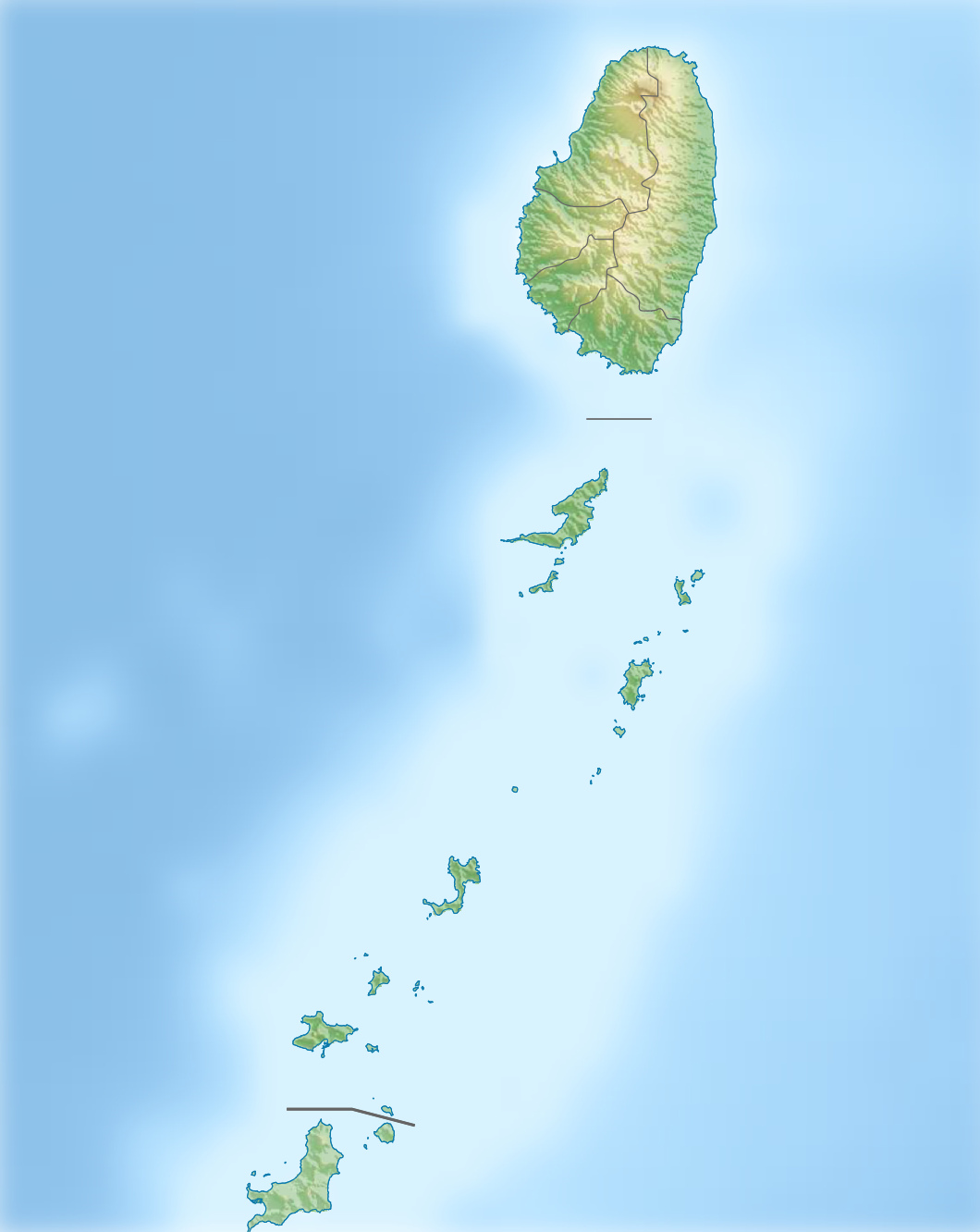
- Location within Saint Vincent and the Grenadines Location within Lesser Antilles Location within the Caribbean

Geography
- Location: Caribbean
- Coordinates: 12°47′32″N 61°16′47″W
- Archipelago: Grenadines
- Area: 15 ha (37 acres)

Administration
- Saint Vincent and the Grenadines

Additional information
Petit Canouan Wildlife Reserve
- IUCN category IV (habitat/species management area)
- Interactive map of Petit Canouan Wildlife Reserve
- Area: 19.2 km^{2} (7.4 sq mi)
- Established: 1987

Petite Canouan is one of the Grenadines, a chain of small islands which lie between the larger Caribbean islands of Saint Vincent and Grenada. Politically, it is part of the nation of Saint Vincent and the Grenadines. It is protected as the Petit Canouan Wildlife Reserve and is also an Important Bird Area (IBA) recognised by the BirdLife International. It supports seabird colonies with tens of thousands of breeding birds, including magnificent frigatebirds, brown boobies, laughing gulls, and sooty, roseate and royal terns.

== Description ==
Petit Canouan is a small island in the northern Grenadines, a chain of islands between the larger Caribbean islands of Saint Vincent and Grenada. It is part of the country of Saint Vincent and the Grenadines and is located around 7–8 kilometres northeast of Canouan. The island is roughly round shaped and has one small hill 60 metres high. The island was historically covered by dry scrubland, but the repeated setting of fires to facilitate the poaching of seabird eggs has left its flora highly degraded and dominated by invasive grasses, with only 28 species of vascular plants found on the island. Most of the island is open expanses of grassland populated by Sporobolus virginicus and the invasive Panicum maximum. There are small patches of Ficus citrifiolia and Hylocereus trigonus woodland on the rocky ridge. There are cactuses such as Piloecerus royenii and Hylocereus trigonus along both the edges of the island, near the cliffs, and in the undergrowth of the woodland.

The island has wildlife refuge status and is protected as Petit Canouan Wildlife Reserve. It was designated a wildlife reserve in 1987, with a total protected area of 19.2 hectares. The island was also designated an Important Bird Area (IBA) by BirdLife International in 2008.

The island suffers heavily from poaching to collect seabird eggs. There is poor enforcement of the island's protected status, although signs denoting its protected status were set up in 2020. Poachers illegally set fires at the start of the migratory season, in March or April, every year. This allows them to collect eggs more easily, but has also left the island extremely degraded, although it does not seem to negatively affect nesting terns beyond the facilitation of poaching.

=== Fauna ===
It has been designated IBA because it supports seabird colonies with tens of thousands of breeding birds, including magnificent frigatebirds, brown boobies, laughing gulls, and sooty, roseate and royal terns. There are three species of reptiles native to the island: the ameiva Ameiva ameiva, the anole Anolis aeneus, and the gecko Thecadactylus rapicauda. The anoles are restricted to the small patches of woodland remaining on the island, while the ameivas and geckos are observed below rocks in the open grass. The ameivas are known to feed on tern carcasses.
