= Judith Philip =

Grenadian planter (c. 1760–1848)

- Born: 1760; Carriacou or Petite Martinique, La Grenade, Colony of France
- Died: 1848 (aged 87–88) "Grand Anse" estate, Carriacou, Grenada, British Windward Islands Administration
- Occupation: plantation owner

Judith Philip (c. 1760 – 1848) was a free, Afro-Grenadian business woman who amassed one of the largest estates in Grenada. By the time Britain emancipated slaves in the West Indies she owned 275 slaves and was compensated 6,603 pounds sterling, one of the largest settlements in the colony.

== Early life ==
Judith Philip was born around 1760 on one of her parents' estates on either Carriacou or Petite Martinique, which at the time was part of La Grenade, a French colony. Her father, Honoré Philip, a French baker, had immigrated from France in the 1750s with two brothers and his mother. Settling on the island of Petite Martinique, Honoré married the African slave Jeanette, probably manumitting her under the provisions of the Code Noir. By 1760, the couple owned estates which were producing cotton and indigo on both Petite Martinique and Carriacou. Judith was the oldest daughter in a family of eight siblings, which included Honoré Jr., Nicholas Regis, Jean Baptiste-Louis, Joachim, Judith, Susanna, Michel and Magdalen. Within three years, the territory of La Grenade was ceded to Britain, at the end of the Seven Years' War.

In the early 1770s, Philip began a relationship with the British merchant Edmund Thornton. The couple never married, though they had five children together: Ann Rachel, Magdalen, Judith, Louis Edmund and Philip. Thornton managed estates on Carriacou for the Clan Urquhart of Aberdeen. The couple's alliance was beneficial to both. Thornton, an Englishman living in the predominantly French colony was able to use Philip's business contacts to negotiate business with other French planters across the Grenadines. In turn, Thornton taught Philip how to read and conduct business in English, broadening her business networks as well. In 1779, the French retook the island of Carriacou. Philip's father, Honoré died that same year and her mother along with the children became the owners of his estates, worth 400,000 livres. The estate contained all of the property on Petite Martinique and a 160-acre estate known as "Grand Anse" near Tyrrel Bay on Carriacou, as well as several lots in the town of Hillsborough. The signing of the Treaty of Paris in 1783, returned Grenada to British control and at that time, Philip and her children moved with Thornton into the town of St. George's. By the time of Philip's mother, Jeanette's death in 1788, the family additionally owned townhouses in Hillsborough, St. George's and Gouyave and more than 200 slaves.

== Career ==
Philip initially took over management of the estate "Grand Anse" from her brother Jean Baptiste-Louis and inherited the estate outright when her mother died in 1788. Over the next ten years, Philip's siblings sold their various properties to her. Nicholas Regis died in 1789 and part of his estate was inherited by Philip. Honoré Jr. sold her his properties on Petite Martinique, St. George's and Hillsborough in 1792 and 1793. Soon after Jean Baptiste-Louis moved to Trinidad and sold his properties to her. In addition to earnings from the three estates on Carriacou, "Grand Ance", "Susannah", and "Petite Ance", Philip collected rents from her town properties. The three plantations formed a triangle on opposite sides of the island allowing Philip to transport slaves as needed from her various estates. Besides the cotton and indigo from her other holdings, she produced cacao at "Susannah". In 1794, Thornton returned to England and married Jane Butler, daughter of Thomas Butler, the Archdeacon of Chester. Philip and her children also moved to England and established a residence at 33 Great Coram Street, a short walk from Thornton and his new wife. She and Thornton had their last two children in London, and Philip remained for a decade while her five children pursued their education.

Soon after Philip and Thornton left Grenada, an uprising known as the Fédon Rebellion was launched in 1795. The rebellion pitted the free coloured population against the British and the administrative policies which denied them the privileges they had seen under French rule. Philip's brother Joachim, who had fallen deeply into debt and was sued by his creditors, became a trusted lieutenant of the revolutionary leader Julien Fédon. In 1804, Joachim was captured and executed by the British for his participation in the rebellion. Though the British took reprisals against the rebels, Philip for the most part was spared, in part because she, through Thornton, had made strategic connections with British community, and in part because her estates on outlying islands had little involvement in the uprising. During her years abroad, Philip's estates were managed by her sister Susannah, who was living in Trinidad and from whom, Philip had acquired the plantation "Susannah".

Returning to Grenada in 1808, Philip took over the control of her estates, managing many of her siblings holdings as well. She continued to purchase property both in Grenada and London and managed the investments of her children. The slave registers of 1817, show that Philip's main property at "Grand Anse" exceeded 400 acres of land and was worked by 276 slaves. She also had slaves registered in Trinidad, probably working on her siblings' estates there. Through the 1820s, Philip was among the most influential Grenadian planters, taking an active role in the social and business life of the colony. In 1822, when one of her slaves was sentenced to death for a domestic dispute with another slave, she organized a petition and obtained signatures from the island's elite to have his sentence commuted. That she was a French, free coloured female planter and was able to secure a commutation from the British colonial secretary, speaks to her high regard and position in the colony. In 1833, when she received compensation under the Abolition Act, Philip was paid over 6,603 pounds sterling for her 275 slaves, making her one of the wealthiest planters on the island.

== Death and legacy ==
Philip died in 1848 and her estate was bequeathed to her children and grandchildren. Four months after her death, her daughters put the property in Grenada, with the exception of "Grand Anse", up for sale with the intent of returning to England, where they owned other property.
