= Large Island =

Island near Carriacou in the Caribbean

- Location of Large Island in Grenada

Geography
- Location: Caribbean Sea, Grenada
- Coordinates: 12°24′00″N 61°30′00″W
- Area: 0.15 km^{2} (0.058 sq mi)

Demographics
- Population: 0

Large Island is an islet between the main island and Grenadines of Grenada. It is an uninhabited island and forms part of Carriacou and Petite Martinique, a dependency of Grenada.

== Geography ==
Large Island is an islet in the Carriacou and Petite Martinique, a dependency of Grenada, located south of the Saint Vincent and the Grenadines. It is one of the eight smaller satellite islands of Granada. It lies 29 km (18 miles) to the north of the main island of Granada, and 8.0 km (5 miles) to the south of Carriacou in the Grenadines, which is shared between Grenada and Saint Vincent and Grenadines. Spread across a land area of roughly 0.15 km^{2} (0.058 sq mi), it is the third smallest of the Grenadine islands, and does not have a permanent population.

== Flora and fauna ==
The island is surrounded by coral reefs, and forms the habitat of various marine organisms. The island itself is home to smaller reptiles such as Grenada bush anole.
