= Fort Duvernette =

Fort in Saint Vincent and the Grenadines

Coordinates: 13°7′41″N 61°12′14″W

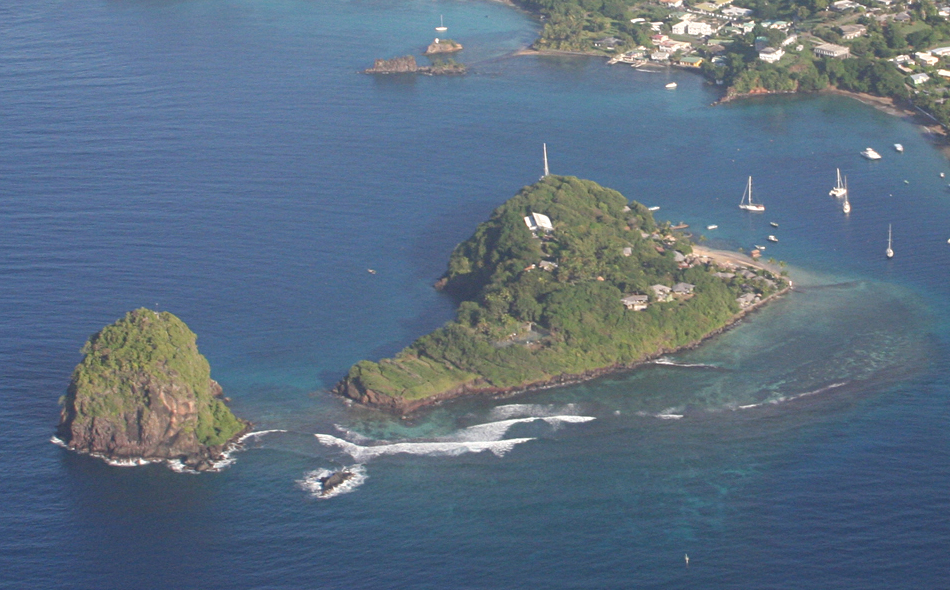
2005 aerial photograph of Fort Duvernette (left) and Young Island (right)

Fort Duvernette (also known as Rock Fort) is a ruined fortification in Saint Vincent and the Grenadines. It sits atop a 190-foot (58 m) tall basalt volcanic plug off Young Island. During the British colonial period, the fort, which has two batteries, was manned by British Marines. In 1795, the fort and its garrison played a role in saving the survivors of a Carib attack on a British convoy during the Second Carib War. The fort ceased to have a military purpose by 1878 and in 1971 was handed to the St. Vincent and the Grenadines National Trust.

== Military use ==
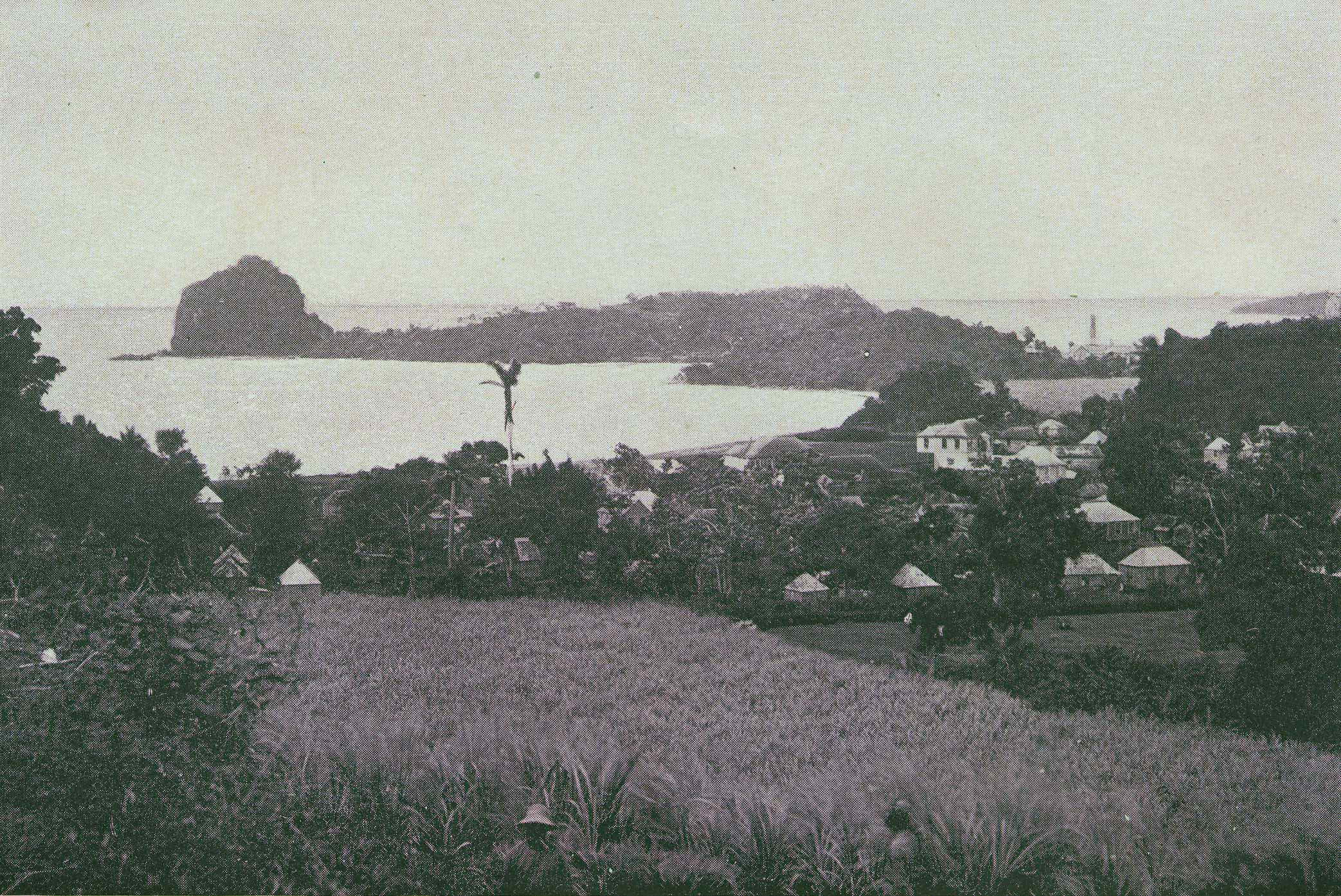
1890s photograph showing Fort Duvernette at left with Young Island to the right and Calliaqua on the mainland in the foreground

The fort is constructed on a basalt volcanic plug, rising some 190 feet (58 m) above sea level off Young Island in the bay off Calliaqua on the south coast of Saint Vincent. The fort was constructed to protect the anchorage in the bay which was important for the British sugar trade. In its final configuration it consisted of two batteries; one on the summit and one 40 feet (12 m) down the slope. the lower battery has two positions, one facing south and one west. The west position currently holds a mortar, water cistern and powder store. The summit battery currently has four cannons, a mortar and the ruins of the officers' quarters. The surviving artillery pieces are believed to be original and their markings date them to the reigns of George II (1727–1760) and George III (1760–1820). The cannons are 24-pounder long guns and the mortars are 8 inches (200 mm) in calibre. Access to the batteries was by a flight of 255 steps cut into the rock, running up from the landing stage. By the late 18th century, a battery on the mainland at Arnos Vale supported the fort, which was typically manned by a detachment of British marines.

In September 1795, during the Second Carib War, a convoy escort of 300 men under Colonel Ritchie attempted to carry supplies from Kingstown to a British post known as Vigie near Fort Duvernette. The convoy was attacked by Caribs and defeated; Ritchie was mortally wounded while leading survivors in holding a defensive position during the retreat. A number of British troops escaped to safety at Fort Duvernette; though it is unlikely they would have survived had a detachment not been present there. The fort's commander, Major Henry Sharpe, opened fire with his artillery to protect the survivors and buy them time to enter the fortification. Around 60 men from the convoy escort were killed or taken prisoner during the action and the supplies lost.

In 1878, the fort, which had ceased to serve a military purpose, was designated a lazaretto to be administered by the Lieutenant governor of Saint Vincent.

== Heritage site ==
The site was given to the St. Vincent and the Grenadines National Trust in 1971. It is now an important wildlife habitat, hosting Ramie (scaly-naped) pigeons, blue herons, and sea hawks while the surrounding seas hold Tripneustes ventricosus urchins and seagrass. Young Island is now a private resort and national wildlife reserve.

In 2010, the National Trust, supported by the embassy of Finland to Venezuela (that also provides representation to the Caribbean Community and the Organisation of Eastern Caribbean States, both of which Saint Vincent and the Grenadines is a member of), began a series of works on the fort that included repair of the landing jetty, improvements to the steps, placement of rubbish bins, installation of protective netting to the rocks, refurbishment of the artillery pieces, and erection of gazebos. Works commenced in October 2010 and were expected to be complete by December. The fort reopened late, on 19 May 2011, and the works cost a total of 100,000 Eastern Caribbean dollars; the reopening ceremony was attended by Minister of Tourism Saboto Caesar.

The body of an elderly Saint Vincentian man was recovered by the coastguard from the sea between the fort and Young Island on 9 March 2021. The fort was closed to public for repairs from 15 August 2022, due to dangerous conditions. On 1 August 2023, a Nigerian medical student died nearby after slipping from a rock and falling into the sea while attempting to return to the fort from Young Island. His visit was made during the closure period. The fort was closed again over safety concerns on 31 January 2025.
