= Petite Mustique =

Uninhabited island in Saint Vincent and the Grenadines

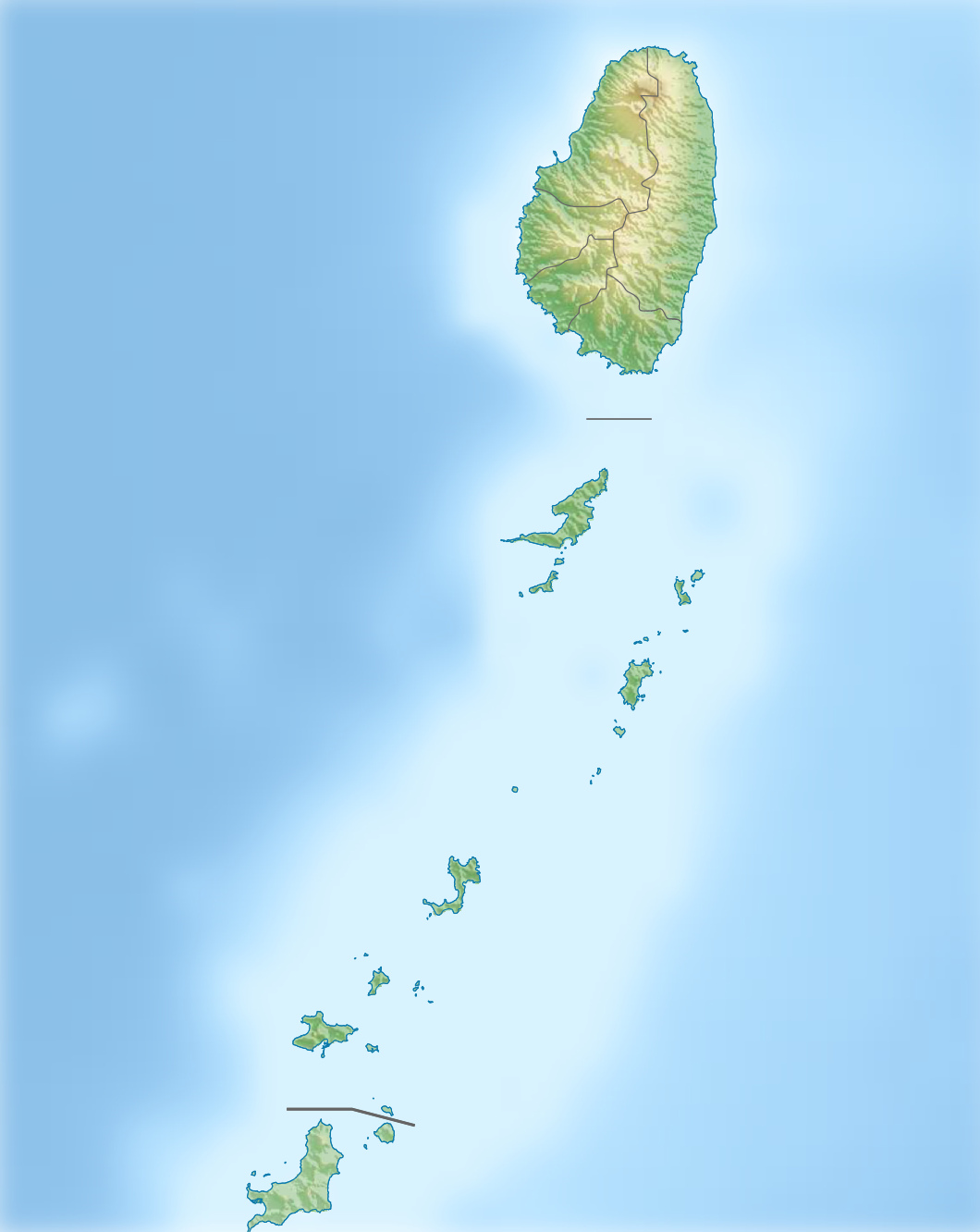
- Location within Saint Vincent and the Grenadines Location within Lesser Antilles Location within the Caribbean

Geography
- Location: Caribbean
- Coordinates: 12°50′21″N 61°11′41″W
- Archipelago: Grenadines
- Area: 0.4 km^{2} (0.15 sq mi)
- Highest elevation: 340 ft (104 m)

Administration
- Saint Vincent and the Grenadines

Additional information
- Time zone: AST (UTC-4)
- Private island

Petite Mustique (also called Petit Mustique) is a small island in the Caribbean nation of Saint Vincent and the Grenadines. About 100 acres (40 ha) in size, Petite Mustique is located 2 miles (3.2 km) northeast of Savan and 1 mile (1.6 km) south of the larger island of Mustique. Petite Mustique is uninhabited and undeveloped. Sedimentary in nature, the island is hilly, reaching 340 ft (100 m) high, and has no easy landings or large beaches. Locally, the name of the island is pronounced "petty."

== Geography ==
The island is just over 2 km south of Mustique's southernmost point. In between lies the tiny rocky land Petit Cay, which represents the continuation of the north-western tip of the island. Petite Mustique, like all islands of the Grenadines, is severely rugged. Six gullies fall away into the sea and enclose the bays of the island, with the southernmost gully slightly longer than the others. South of the south-western panhandle stands Dry Rock, and about 500 m south-west of that is a reef.

The island's shore is characterized by almost continuous cliffs. There are few opportunities to get to the island from the sea, and the hills of the island are covered with dense vegetation. There is no permanent water source available. The Windward Islands (Lesser Antilles) continue a number of miles south with the Savan group.

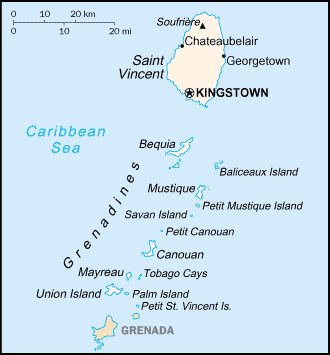
Petite Mustique is located south of Mustique, near the center of this map.

== History and scam ==
The island was sold to the government of Saint Vincent sometime shortly before 1806. There may have been an attempt to establish a leper colony on the island; four individuals were listed as living there in 1817, but the island was uninhabited by 1867. A skull found on the island has been dated to that period and shows evidence of leprosy.

Petite Mustique is privately owned by a dual-national Belgian and Vincentian citizen named Thierry Nano. Nano acquired the island for little money while living in Saint Vincent and the Grenadines in the early 1990s, and was later involved in several schemes to sell the property for far more than its actual value. In early 2007, Nano approached Vizzion Europe, a Belgian development company founded by Turko-Belgian CEO Şefik Birkiye. By April, Vizzion Europe agreed to buy Petit Mustique for $62 million in order to develop a luxury hotel and resort, as Nano assured the company the island was flat, clear, and with a large and easily accessible beach. However, Nano did not allow any Vizzion Europe employees or surveyors to visit or see the island during the negotiations.

In October 2007, however, after $2.1 million had already been paid to Nano, Vizzion Europe discovered that the island was hilly, without beaches, and surrounded by powerful currents that prevented easy landing. Nano refused to return the money. While filing a lawsuit against Nano, Vizzion Europe discovered that he was already wanted on charges of fraud and money laundering in the United States and Italy as well as Belgium. Nano had narrowly escaped arrest by the FBI in Saint Vincent and the Grenadines in 2001, possibly due to inaction by the Vincentian government.

While contending with Vizzion Europe in Belgian court, Nano continued to shop Petite Mustique to private buyers, arranging a sale to Ilyas Khrapunov, son of the Kazakh oligarch and government minister Mukhtar Ablyazov. Nano sealed the deal with Khrapunov by offering him a free Monet painting in addition to the island. An appraisal revealed the painting to be fake. Upon Khrapunov's subsequent discovery that the island was not what he had been promised, Nano refused to return the $500,000 deposit he had received and moved to South America, managing to carry off a scam against the Paraguayan government in 2010 also involving the sale of property.

However, in 2012, Nano was arrested in France and extradited to Italy, where he was sentenced to six years in prison for conspiracy and fraud in an unrelated case. After serving his sentence, he was subsequently extradited to Belgium to face charges related to the fraudulent sales of Petite Mustique. Nano now asserts that he remains the owner of Petite Mustique Island. In November 2018, Nano was sentenced to 30 months in prison and ordered to pay a fine of €192,500 for defrauding Vizzion Europe about the condition of Petite Mustique.
