= Saline Island =

Island in Grenada

Nickname: Land of reefs
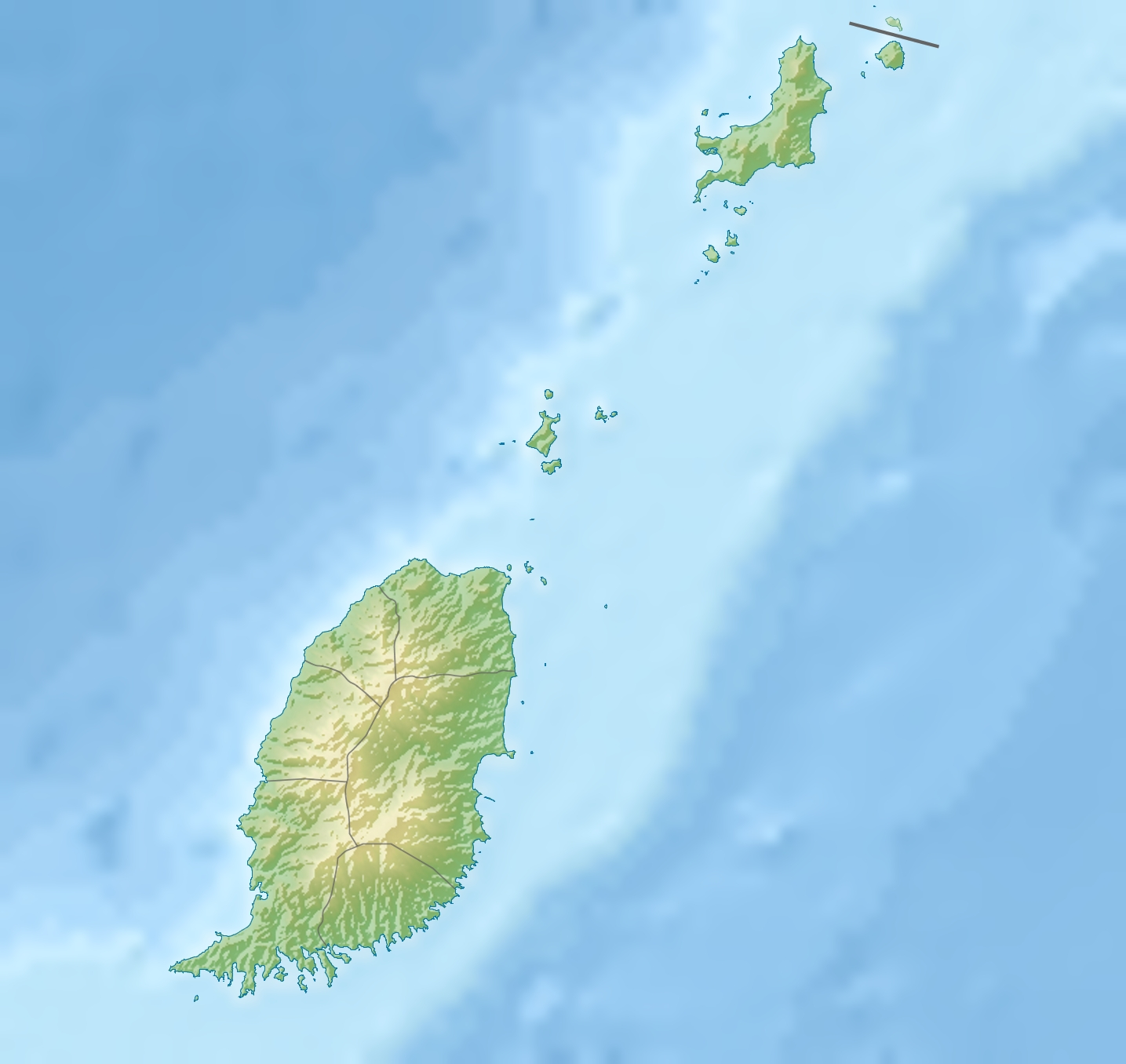
- Location within Grenada Location within Lesser Antilles Location within the Caribbean

Geography
- Location: Caribbean
- Coordinates: 12°25′50″N 61°28′20″W
- Archipelago: Grenadines
- Area: 0.11 sq mi (0.28 km^{2})

Administration
- Grenada
- Prime Minister of Grenada: Dr. Keith Mitchell

Demographics
- Population: 1
- Pop. density: 0/sq mi (0/km^{2})

Saline Island is a small, 64 acre islet between Grenada and Carriacou (Grenadines). It is located next to Frigate Island. There is a single watchman living in a 2 bedroom house. The island contains a large salt pond and has a wildlife population consisting of wild goats, sea turtles, and birds. The remains of an ancient lime kiln are also on the island.
