= Young Island (Grenadines) =

Island of Saint Vincent and the Grenadines

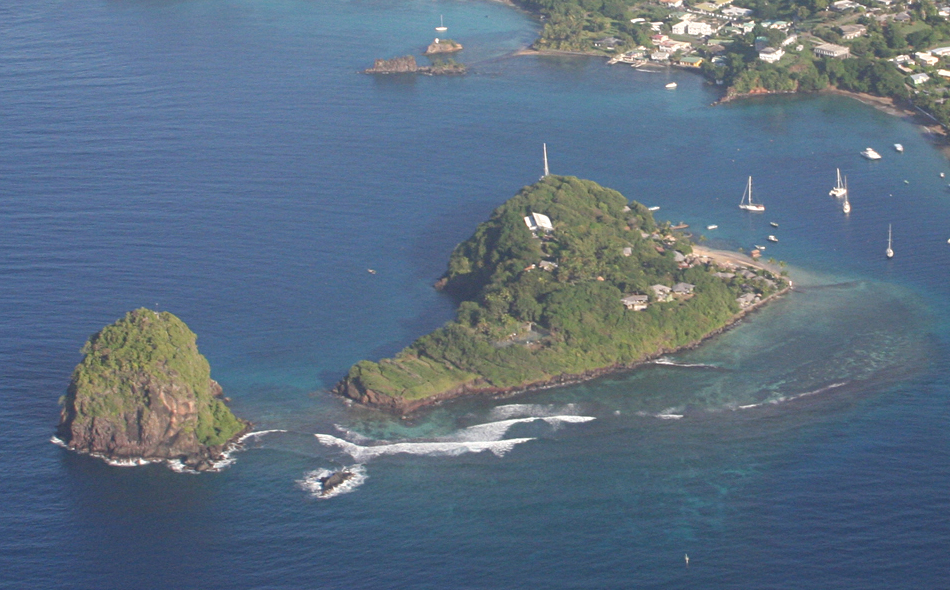
- Fort Duvernette and Young Island (2006)

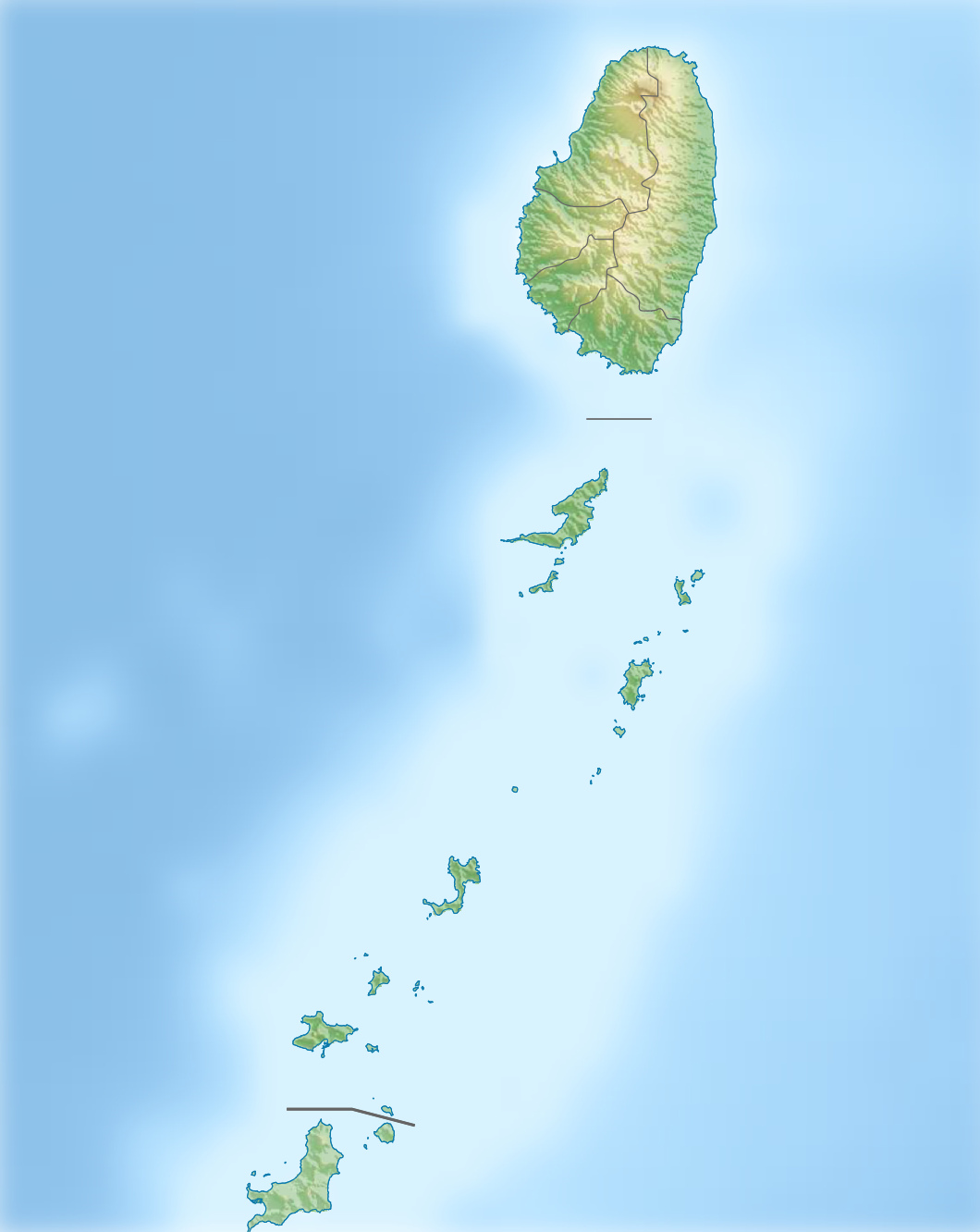
- Location within Saint Vincent and the Grenadines Location within Lesser Antilles Location within the Caribbean

Geography
- Location: Caribbean Sea
- Coordinates: 13°07′50″N 61°12′09″W

Administration
- Saint Vincent and the Grenadines

Additional information
- Official website: Young Island
- Private island

Young Island is one of the smallest islands of Grenadines and part of the state St. Vincent and the Grenadines. It lies immediately south of St. Vincent island, separated from it by a channel approximately 180 m (590 ft) wide. The name goes back to the former British Governor of St. Vincent William Young.

== Geography ==
Young Island belongs to the Grenadines, an archipelago of the Lesser Antilles, and administratively belongs to the Saint George Parish. The island is 180 m (590 ft) south of the main island St. Vincent at the entrance of Calliaqua Bay and consists of volcanic rock. Immediately south of Young Island, less than 55 metres (60 yd) from the island, stands the Fort Duvernette, dating from the 18th century and partially carved out of a 60-metre (200 ft) conical rocky outcropping.

== Traffic and tourism ==
Young Island can only be reached by a small ferry that travels regularly to and from St. Vincent. The island is privately owned, and prior to 1974 work began on building a luxury holiday resort. Currently, the settlement includes 29 cottages.
