= Quatre =

Island in Grenadines Parish, Saint Vincent and the Grenadines

Native name: Isle à Quatre
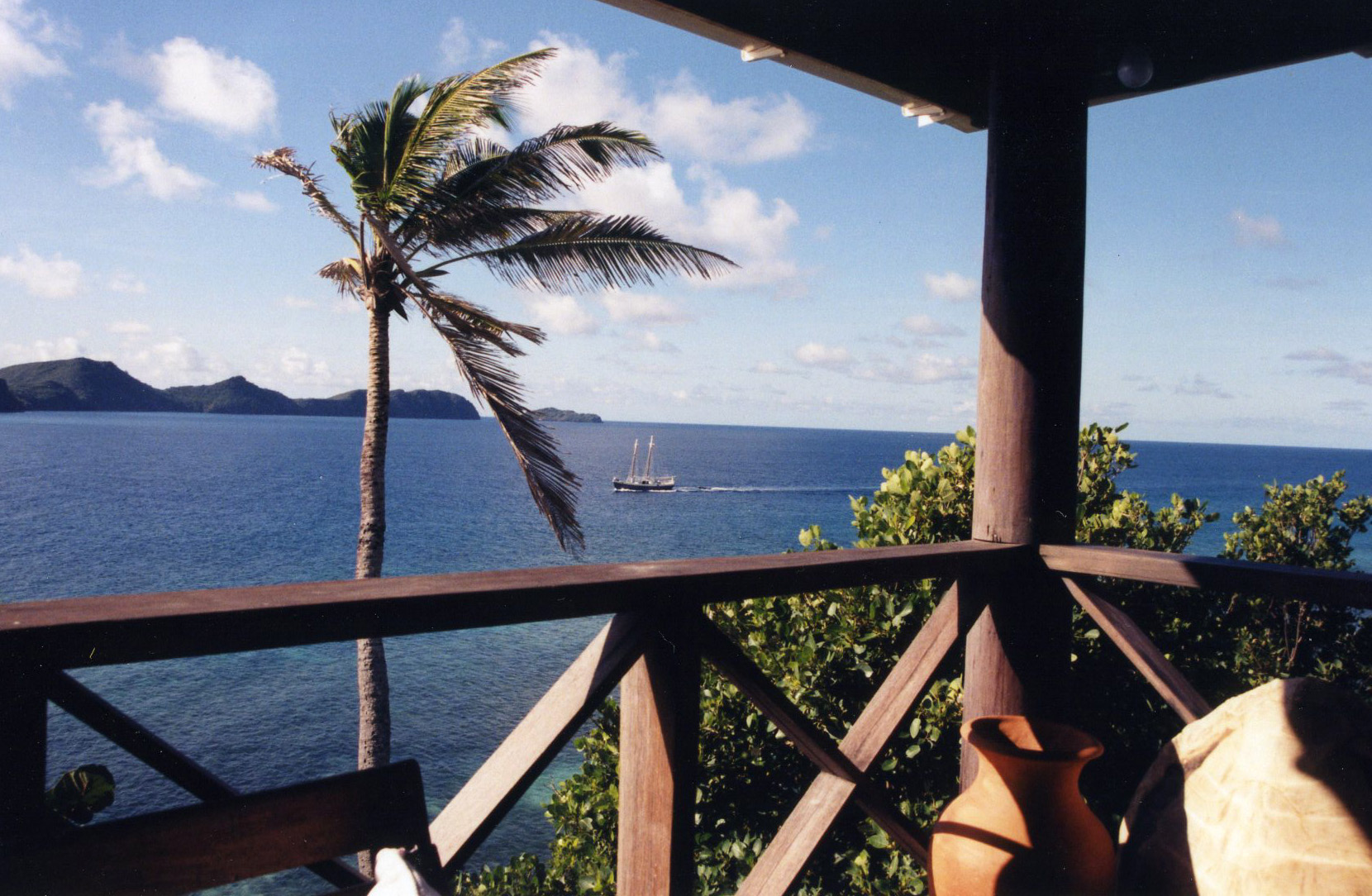
- View S-W from Bequia island. Isle Quatre is on the horizon in the left side of the picture.

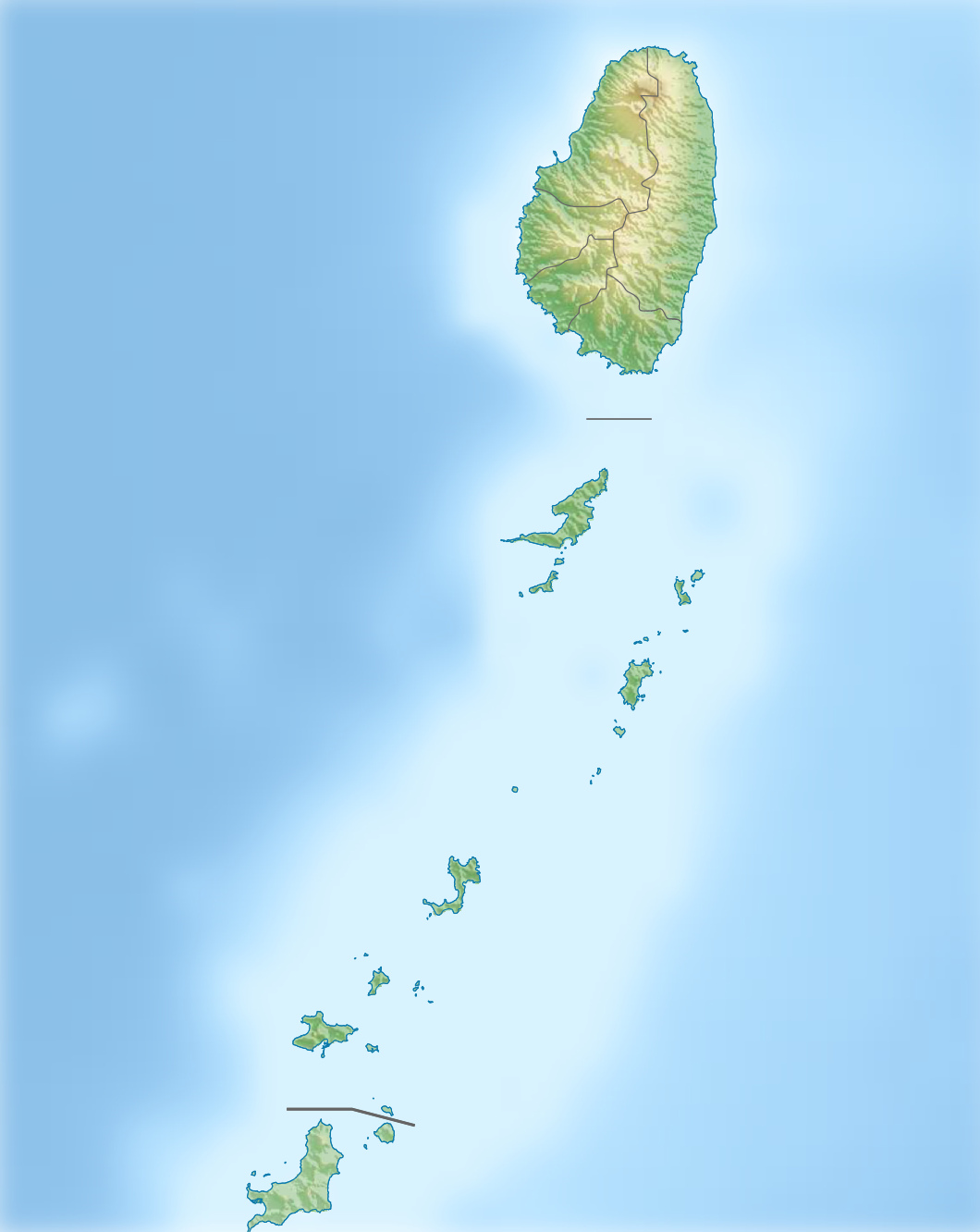
- Location within Saint Vincent and the Grenadines Location within Lesser Antilles Location within the Caribbean

Geography
- Location: Caribbean
- Coordinates: 12°57′15.4″N 61°15′09.5″W
- Archipelago: Grenadines
- Area: 1.52 km^{2} (0.59 sq mi)
- Highest elevation: 146 m (479 ft)

Administration
- Saint Vincent and the Grenadines

Additional information
- Time zone: AST (UTC-4)
Private island
Isle Quatre Marine Reserve / Marine Conservation Area
- IUCN category IV (habitat/species management area)
- Interactive map of Isle Quatre Marine Reserve / Marine Conservation Area
- Area: 332.3 km^{2} (128.3 sq mi)
- Established: 1987
- Website: Isle Quatre in Saint Vincent and the Grenadines

Quatre is one of the Grenadines islands which lies between the Caribbean islands of Saint Vincent and Grenada. It is part of Saint Vincent and the Grenadines.

== Geography ==
Quatre island lies southwest of Petit Nevis Island, south of the larger island Bequia,and north of Canouan. About 8 km (5.0 mi) to the southeast is the private island of Mustique. It has an area of 1.52 km^{2} (0.59 sq mi), a length of 3 km (1.9 mi), and a width of 250 to 950 m (820 to 3,120 ft). The highest point reaches 146 m (479 ft) above sea level, and the average height is 38 m (125 ft).

== History ==
The island, along with the other islands of Saint Vincent and the Grenadines, was a French colony until it was ceded to the British Empire in the aftermath of the Seven Years' War, in 1763.

For more than a hundred years, the island has been owned by the Mitchell family, a lineage which includes Sir James Mitchell.

== Ecology ==
=== Flora ===
There are cactuses and a few deciduous, tropical trees located in the central forest of the island, along with some manchineel trees, one of the deadliest plants in the world. The island was formerly home to pink manjack trees, which were used for shipbuilding.

=== Fauna ===
Chickens, goats, and some biting insects are known to inhabit the island.
