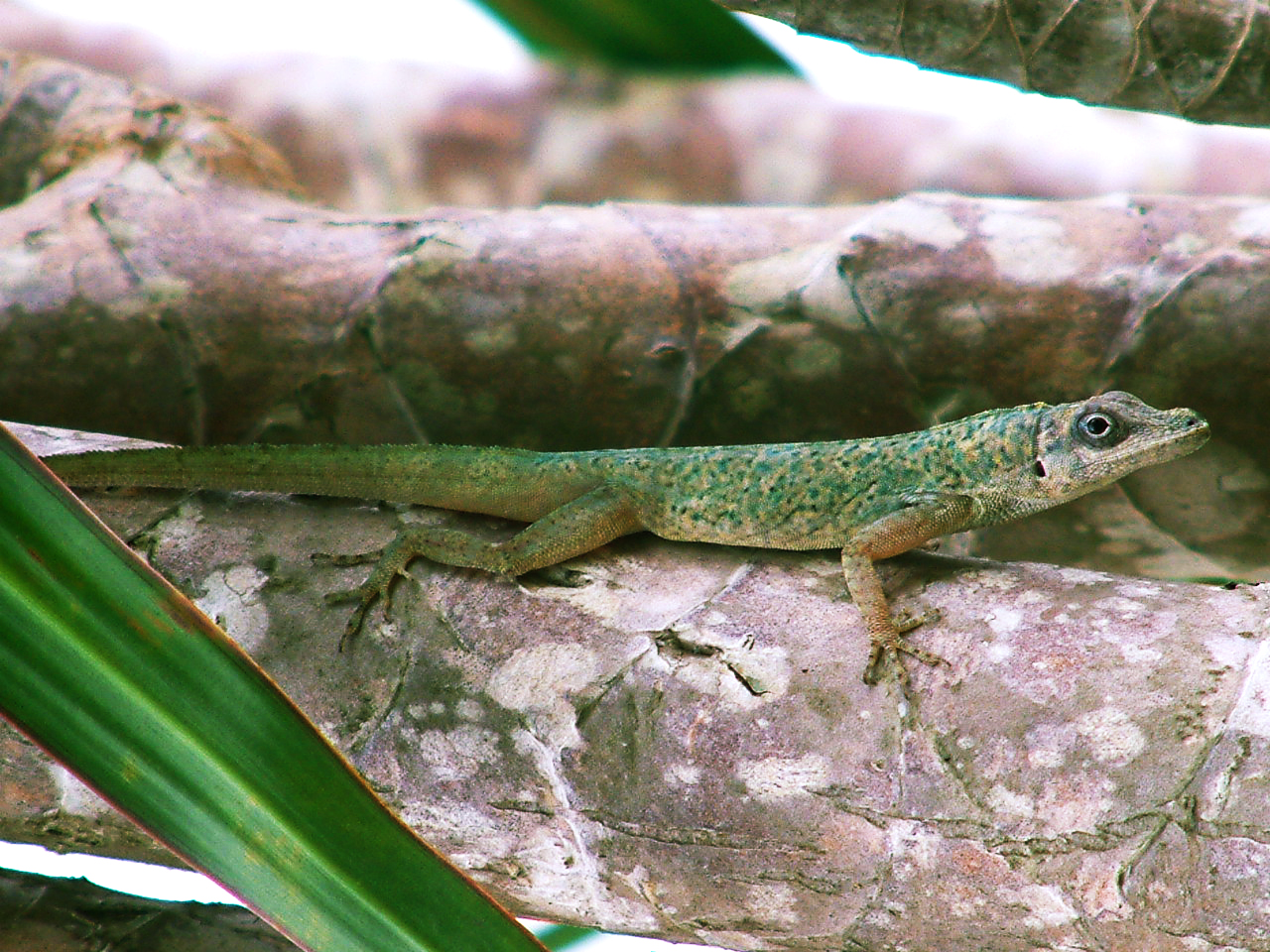

Conservation status
- Least Concern (IUCN 3.1)

Scientific classification
- Kingdom: Animalia
- Phylum: Chordata
- Class: Reptilia
- Order: Squamata
- Suborder: Iguania
- Family: Dactyloidae
- Genus: Anolis
- Species: A. aeneus

Binomial name
- Anolis aeneus Gray, 1840

Synonyms
- Anolis gentilis Garman, 1888; Anolis roquet var. cinereus Garman, 1888

= Bronze anole =

Species of lizard

The Grenada bush anole or bronze anole (Anolis aeneus) is a species of anole lizard found in the Caribbean Lesser Antilles and South America. It is distributed on Grenada and throughout the Grenadines islands, and it has been introduced to Trinidad and Tobago. It can also be found in Guyana on the mainland, where it is locally abundant, though these populations are not native, either.

Males reach a length of 77 mm snout-to-vent. Its dorsal surface color is either pale gray, olive, or chocolate-brown, and it is marked with a pattern of mottling or fine speckles. Its ventral surface is pale, often with dark mottling along the sides. Its dewlap is white or dull green, with a yellow or orange spot near its front edge. Females are brown, with a middorsal stripe or ladder-like marking, and a light flank stripe.

It has been the focus of numerous studies of the behavior and ecological strategies employed by Anolis species.

== See also ==
- List of Anolis lizards

== Sources ==
- Malhotra, Anita; Thorpe, Roger S. (1999). Reptiles & Amphibians of the Eastern Caribbean. Macmillan Education Ltd. pp. 103–104, 106–107. ISBN 0-333-69141-5..
