= Battowia =

Island of Saint Vincent and the Grenadines

Battowia Island
Native name: Battowia
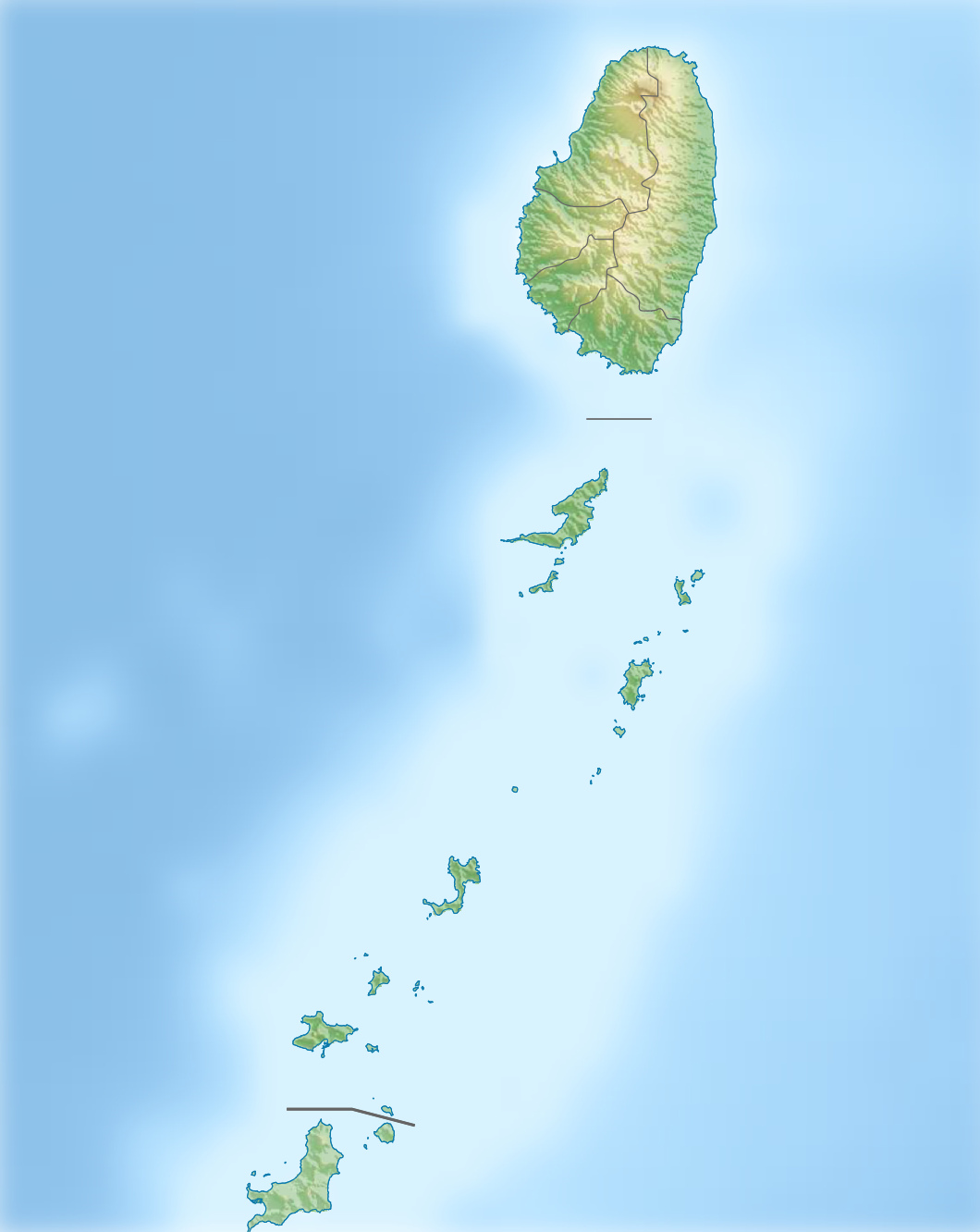
- Location within Saint Vincent and the Grenadines Location within Lesser Antilles Location within the Caribbean

Geography
- Location: Caribbean
- Coordinates: 12°57′45″N 61°07′50″W
- Archipelago: Grenadines
- Highest elevation: 427 ft (130.1 m)

Administration
- Saint Vincent and the Grenadines

Additional information
- Time zone: AST (UTC-4)
- Private island
- IUCN category IV (habitat/species management area)
- Area: 65.9 km^{2} (25.4 sq mi)
- Established: 1987
- Website: Battowia Island in Saint Vincent and the Grenadines

Battowia or Bettowia is one of the Grenadine islands which lie between the Caribbean islands of Saint Vincent and Grenada. Politically, it is part of the nation of Saint Vincent and the Grenadines. It has been declared a Wildlife Reserve.

== Fauna ==
Battowia is locally known as "Bird Island" as it is a roosting and nesting site for a variety of seabirds, including frigatebirds, gulls, boobies, brown pelicans, brown noddies and sooty terns. The island has been designated an Important Bird Area (IBA) by BirdLife International because it is a key roosting and nesting site for seabirds. Land birds include tropical mockingbirds, eared doves and Antillean crested hummingbirds.

Other inhabitants are goats and the rare Barbour's tropical racer.
