= Frigate Island, Grenada =

Coordinates: 12°25′00″N 61°29′00″W

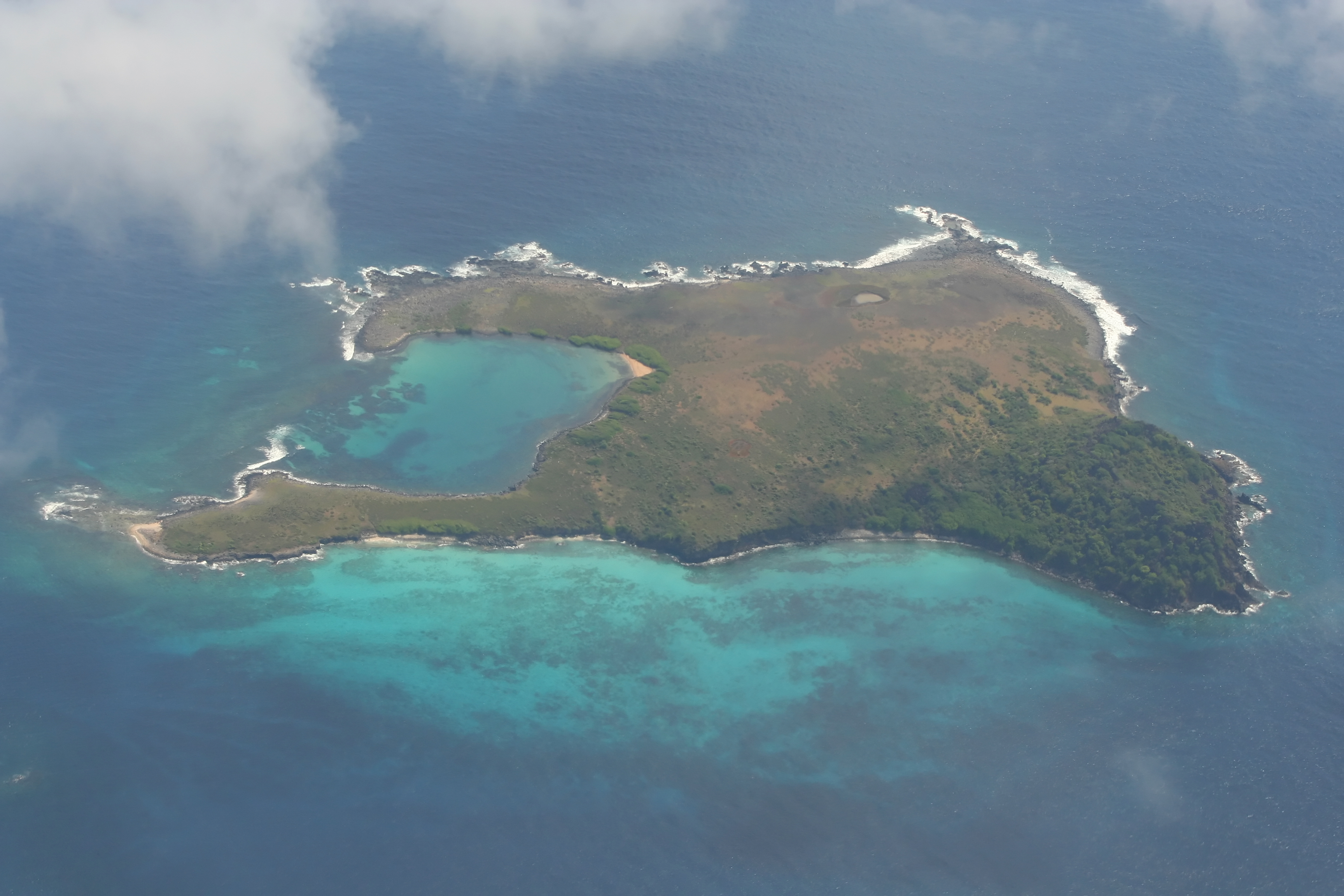
Frigate Island (2009)

Frigate Island is a small islet between Grenada and Carriacou (Grenadines).

Situated just 0.463 miles (0.745 km) north-east of “Large Island” and 0.792 miles (1.275 km) south-west from ”Saline Island”, and 1.596 miles (2.568 km) from Grenada's sister island of Carriacou, one mile due south of Ashton, and half mile from the nearest part of Union Island. Frigate Island, is one of the small rocky islands between St. Vincent's and Grenada, called the Grenadines.

An early yachters pilot book described the sea nearby "A rock, one foot high, lies 2 cables north—west from the north point of Frigate island. There is also a narrow channel with 4 fathoms water northward of Saline island, and southward of Cassada rock (20 feet high) and White islet, together with the reef connecting the two latter".

On the 7 February 1971, Janet Wall of Manchester, Vermont, reported the finding of a fair amount of pottery on a sand spit extending from Frigate Island northward.
