= Savan (island) =

Grenadine island

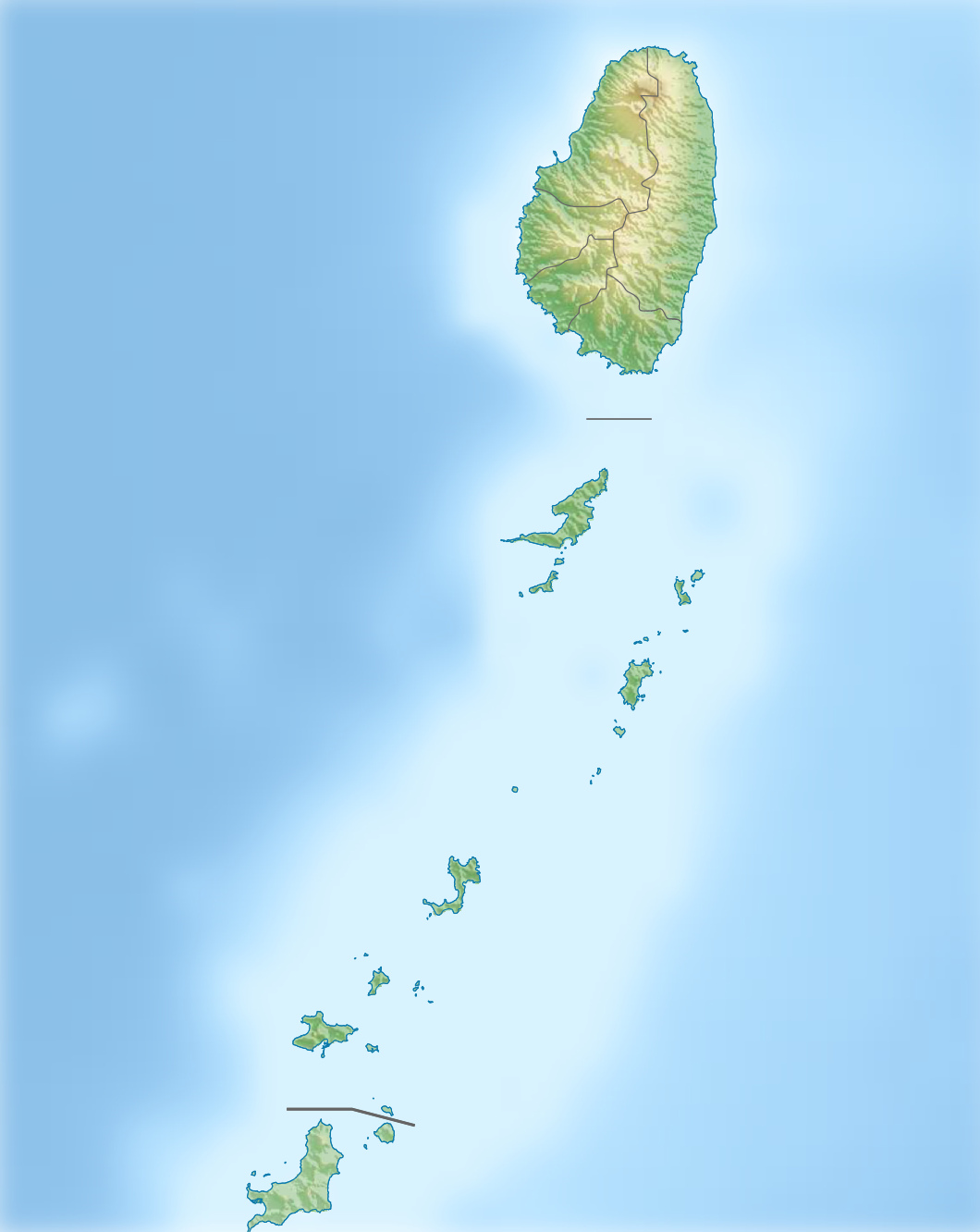
- Location within Saint Vincent and the Grenadines Location within Lesser Antilles Location within the Caribbean

Geography
- Location: Caribbean
- Coordinates: 12°48′25″N 61°12′38″W
- Area: 0.11 km^{2} (0.042 sq mi)

Administration
- Saint Vincent and the Grenadines

Additional information
- Time zone: AST (UTC-4)
Savan Island Wildlife Reserve
- IUCN category IV (habitat/species management area)
- Interactive map of Savan Island Wildlife Reserve
- Area: 10.5 km^{2} (4.1 sq mi)
- Established: 1987
- Website: Savan Island in Saint Vincent and the Grenadines

Savan is one of the Grenadine islands which lie between the Caribbean islands of Saint Vincent and Grenada. Politically, it is part of the nation of Saint Vincent and the Grenadines.
