= Petit Nevis =

Private island in the Caribbean

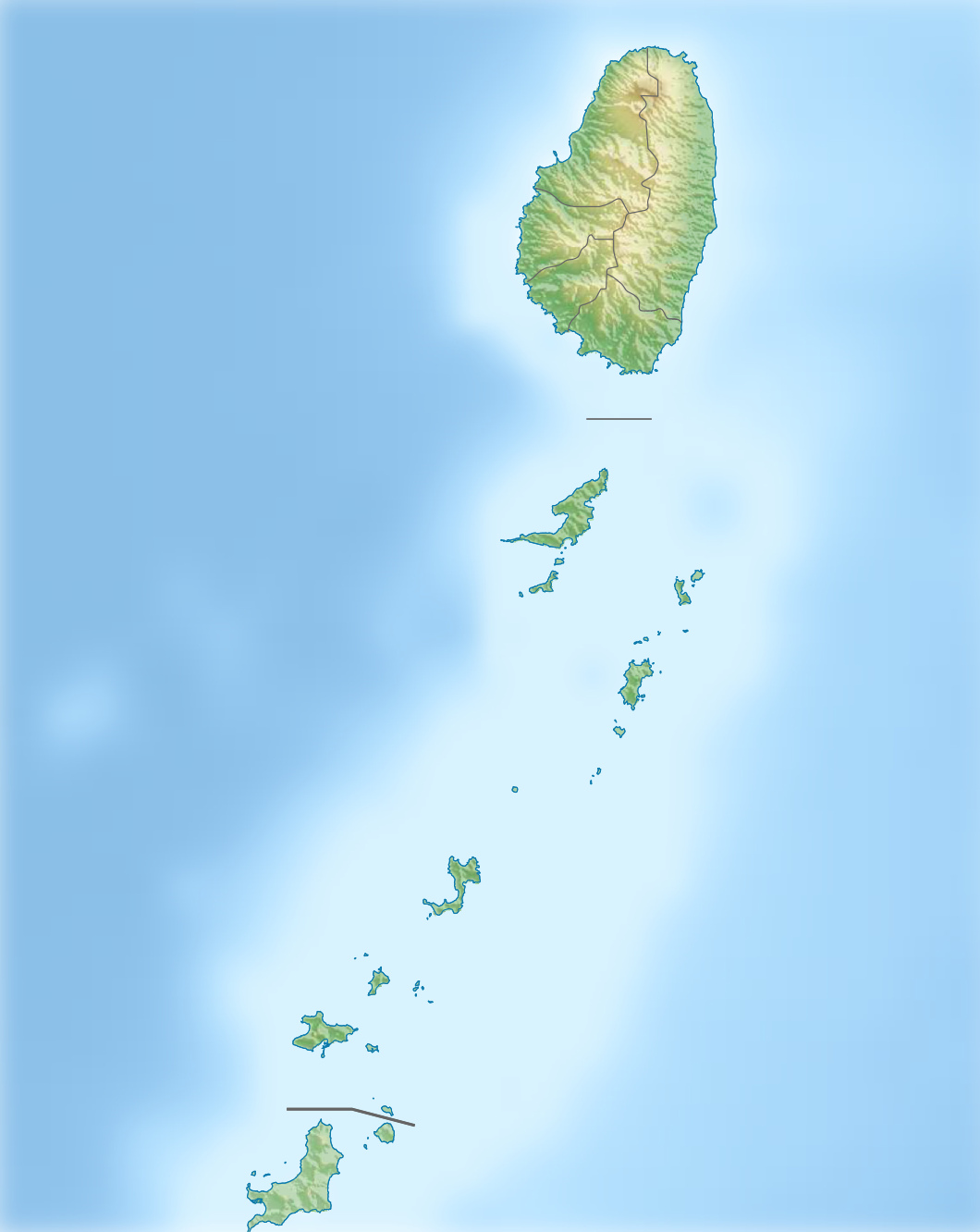
- Location within Saint Vincent and the Grenadines Location within Lesser Antilles Location within the Caribbean

Geography
- Location: Caribbean Sea
- Coordinates: 12.974031°N 61.243522°W
- Area: 71 acres (29 ha)

Administration
- Saint Vincent and the Grenadines

Petit Nevis is a small, privately owned island in the Grenadines, off the coast of Bequia.

== History and Whaling ==
Petit Nevis was historically used as a whaling station, where whalers would process their catches. Whaling was a traditional practice in Bequia, passed down through generations.

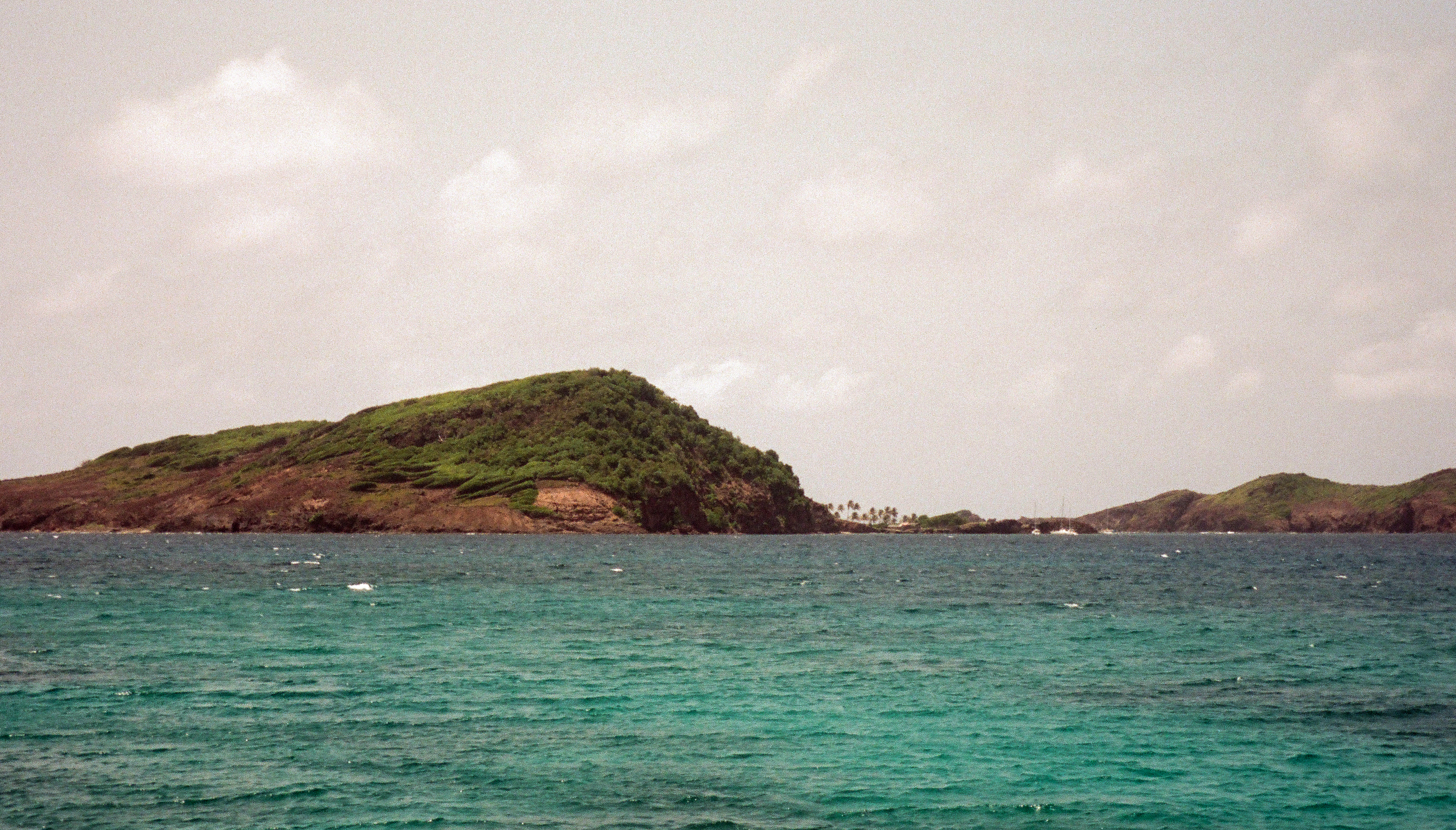
Petit Nevis

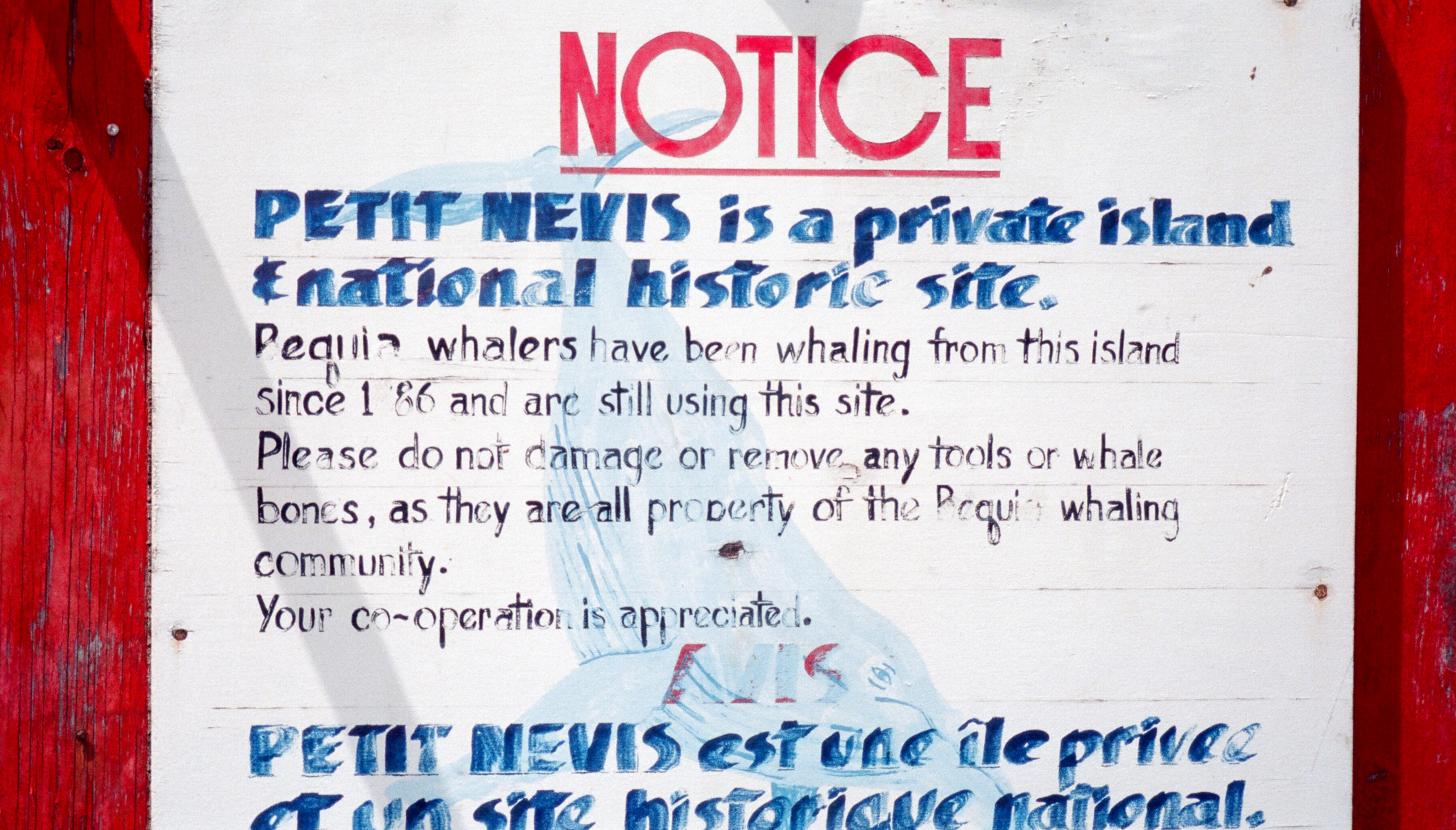
Private island notice on Petit Nevis

However, whaling activities ceased on Petit Nevis in 2006 when the owners of the island decided to distance themselves from the practice. The processing of whales was subsequently relocated to Semplers Cay.

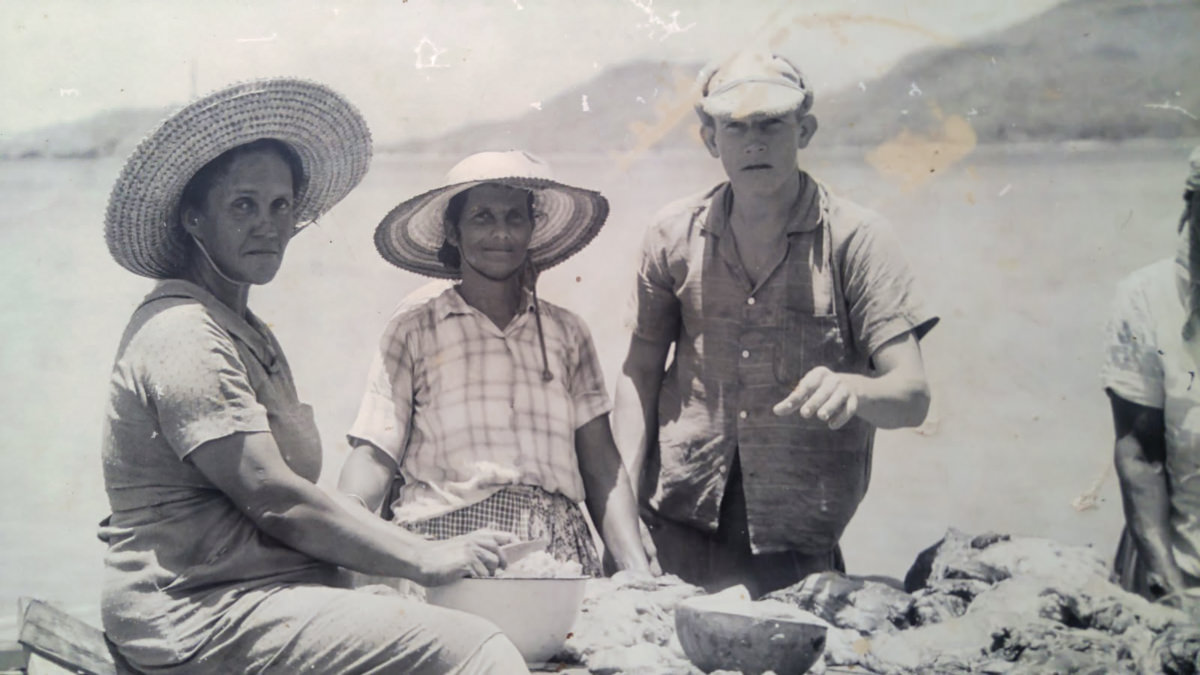
Women cooking whale meat on Petit Nevis, 1960s. Celina Ollivierre is in the center.

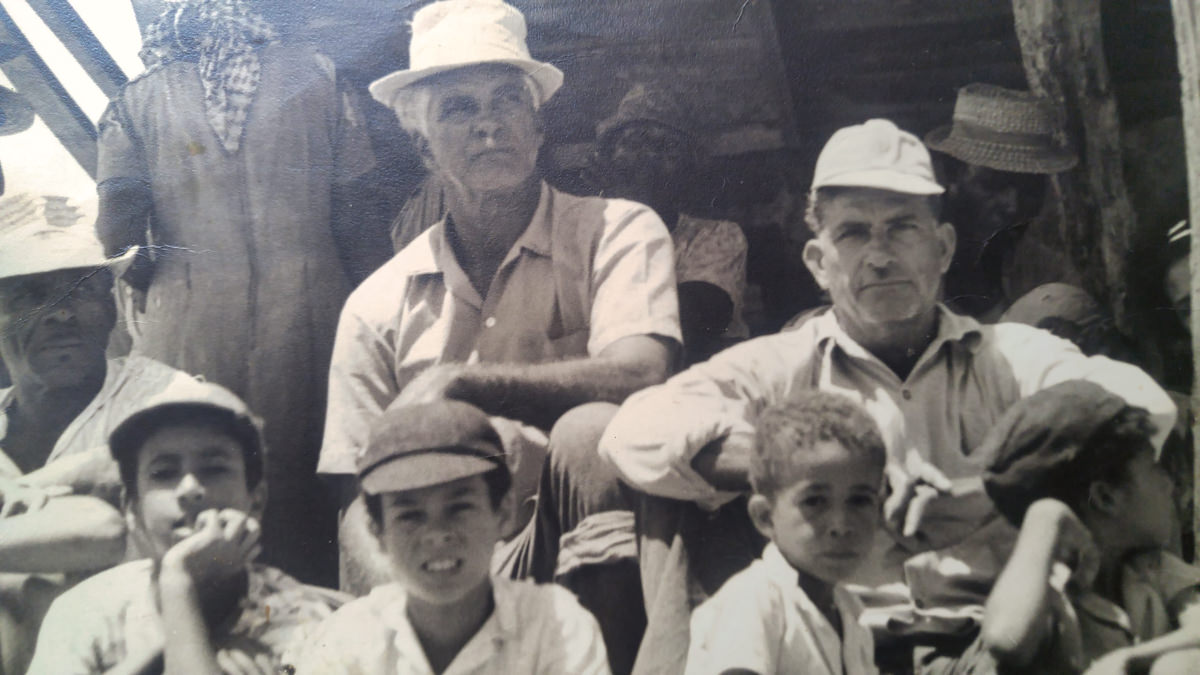
Louis George Ollivierre (left) and his brother Athneal Ollivierre (right), the main harpoonist.

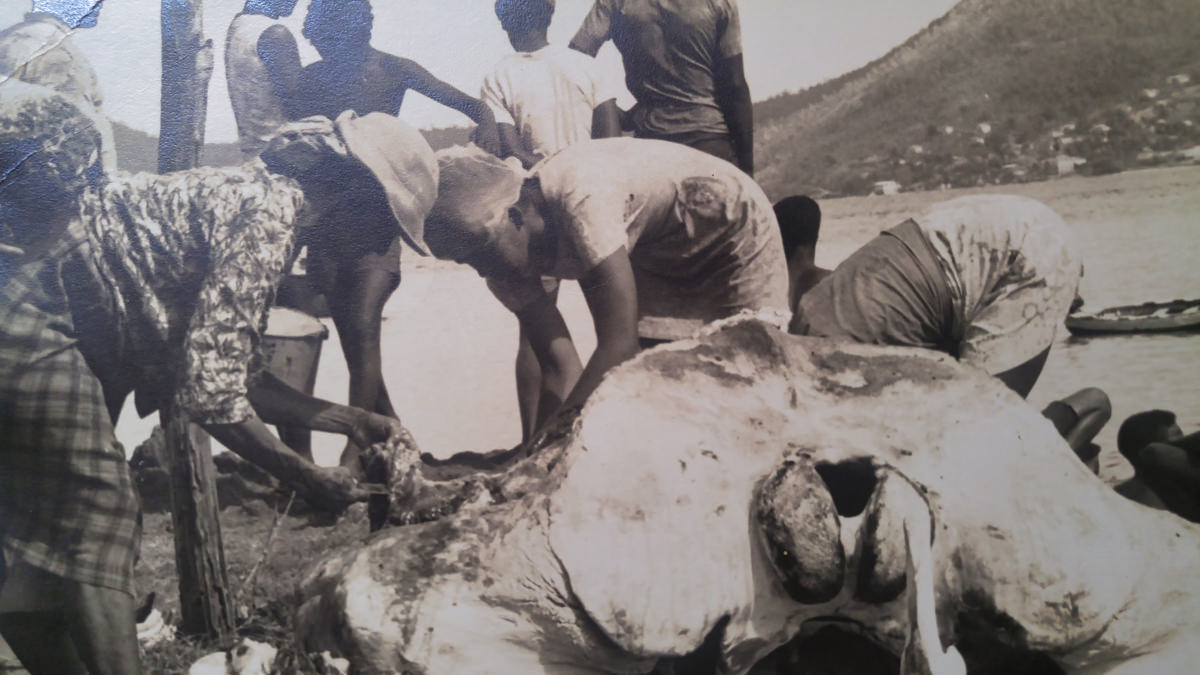
Flensing a Whale on Petit Nevis, 1960s

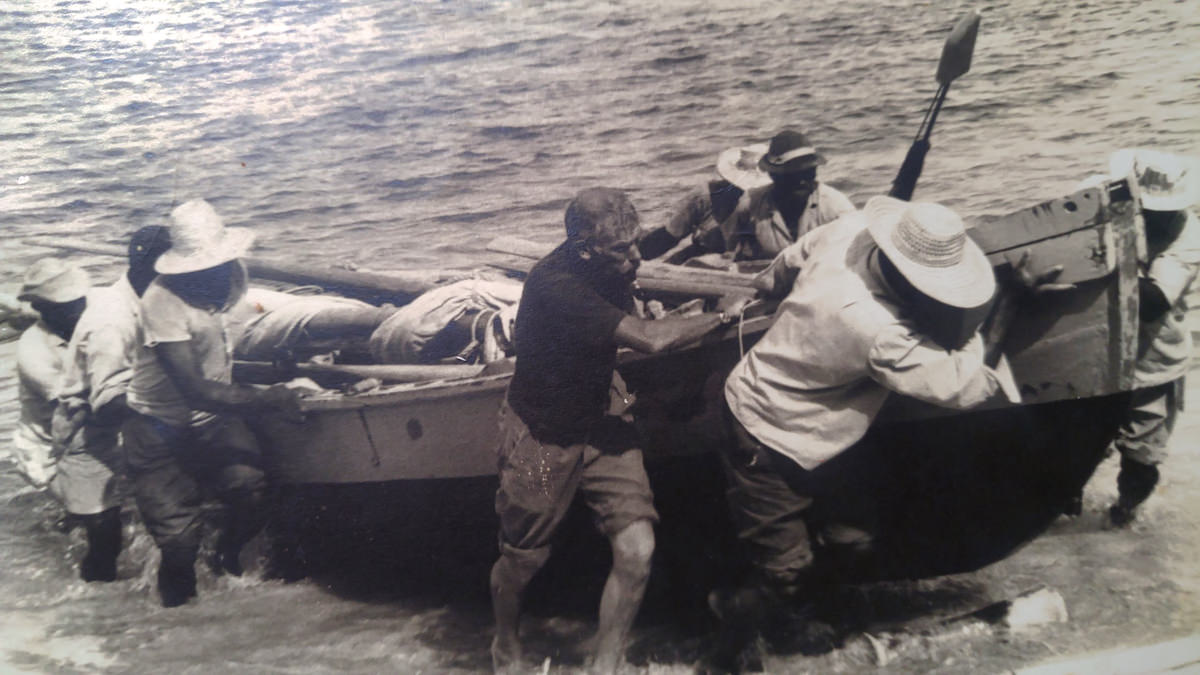
Flensing a Whale on Petit Nevis, 1960s

While limited subsistence whaling still occurs in Bequia, Petit Nevis itself is no longer used for whaling. The transition away from whaling on Petit Nevis aligns with conservation efforts and legal restrictions aimed at protecting whale populations.

Eileen Corea, the last surviving, direct, legal owner of the island, died in July 2011. The island is now owned by the descendants of the previous owners.
