= Grenadines =

Chain of small islands

Coordinates: 12°44′N 61°21′W

Grenadine Islands

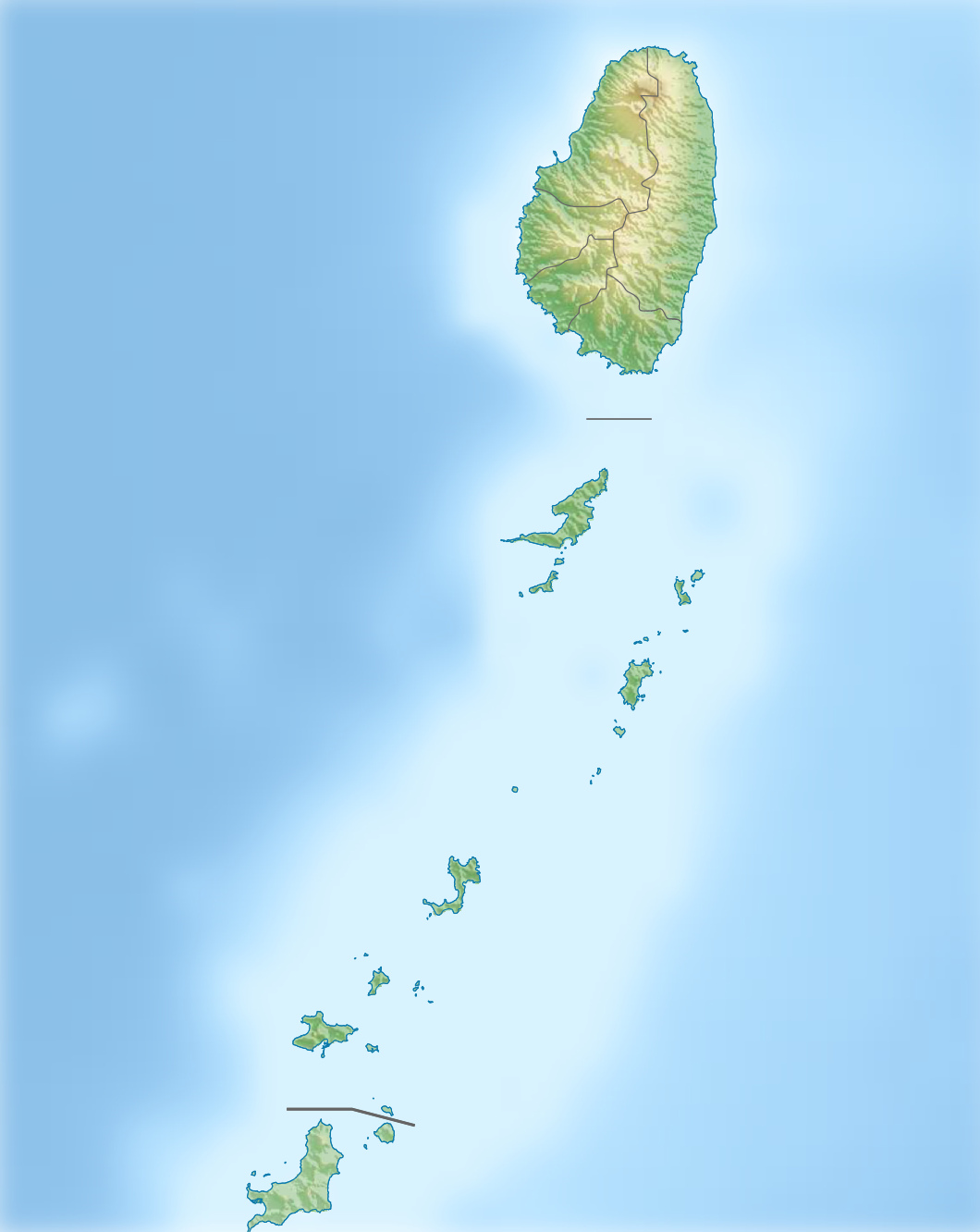
- Location within Saint Vincent and the Grenadines Location within Lesser Antilles Location within the Caribbean

Geography
- Location: Caribbean
- Archipelago: Lesser Antilles
- Total islands: 32
- Major islands: Carriacou, Young Island, Bequia, Mustique, Canouan, Union Island, Mayreau, Petit St Vincent, and Palm Island.
- Area: 86 km^{2} (33 sq mi)

Administration
- Saint Vincent and the Grenadines
- Grenada

Demographics
- Demonym: Grenadinese

Additional information
- Time zone: AST (UTC-4)
Grenadines
- Nickname: Grenadine
- Interactive map of Grenadines
Population
  - Total: est. 20,880
  - Density: 242.8/km^{2} (629/sq mi)

The Grenadines (/ˈɡrɛnədiːnz/) is a chain of small islands that lie on a line between the larger islands of Saint Vincent and Grenada in the Lesser Antilles. Nine are inhabited and open to the public (or ten, if the offshore island of Young Island is counted): Bequia, Mustique, Canouan, Union Island, Petit St Vincent, Palm Island and Mayreau, all in Saint Vincent and the Grenadines, plus Petite Martinique and Carriacou in Grenada. Several additional privately owned islands, such as Calivigny, are also inhabited. Notable uninhabited islands of the Grenadines include Petit Nevis, formerly used by whalers, and Petit Mustique, which was the centre of a prominent real estate scam in the early 2000s.

The northern two-thirds of the chain, including about 32 islands and cays, is part of the country of Saint Vincent and the Grenadines. The southern third of the chain belongs to the country of Grenada. Carriacou is the largest and most populous of the Grenadines.

== Geographic boundaries ==
The islands are politically divided between the island nations of Saint Vincent and the Grenadines and Grenada. They lie between the islands of Saint Vincent in the north and Grenada in the south. Neither Saint Vincent nor Grenada are Grenadine islands. The islands north of the Martinique Channel belong to Saint Vincent and the Grenadines, and the islands south of the channel belong to Grenada.

== History ==
The history of the Grenadines is not well studied due to their relative lack of geopolitical importance, the paucity of original documents and lack of serious research. The islands were sparsely populated by the Kalinago, who used them mainly for fishing and food gathering. When the French claimed Grenada in 1650, the Grenadines were included (St Vincent to the north remained Kalinago country). Because of their small size, dangerous reefs and lack of fresh water, the French used them mainly for fishing, turtle catching and lime-making. They were also used by smugglers and pirates. Permanent settlements began about 1740. When the British took over in 1762 there were a fair number of French plantations on Bequia and Carriacou. In 1791 the islands were divided between Grenada and Saint Vincent.

== Larger islands of the Grenadines ==
=== Saint Vincent and the Grenadines ===
The total population of the Grenadine islands within Saint Vincent and the Grenadines is estimated to be 10,234. The following islands make up the Grenadines Parish:

Island	Area	Pop.	Capital
Northern Grenadines			
Bequia	18.3 km^{2} (7.1 sq mi)	5,300	Port Elizabeth
Mustique	5.70 km^{2} (2.20 sq mi)	800	Lovell (private island)
Southern Grenadines			
Union Island	9 km^{2} (3.5 sq mi)	2,700	Clifton
Canouan	7.60 km^{2} (2.93 sq mi)	1,200	Port Charlestown
Mayreau	1.20 km^{2} (300 acres)	280	Old Wall
Uninhabited Grenadines			
Palm Island	0.55 km^{2} (140 acres)		Cactus Hill (private island)
Petit Saint Vincent	0.46 km^{2} (110 acres)		Telescope Hill (private island)
Tobago Cays	0.25 km^{2} (62 acres)		marine reserve
Isle à Quatre	1.52 km^{2} (380 acres)		
Baliceaux	1.20 km^{2} (300 acres)		
Bettowia	0.71 km^{2} (180 acres)		
Petit Mustique	0.40 km^{2} (99 acres)		
Petit Nevis	0.29 km^{2} (72 acres)		
Petit Canouan	0.20 km^{2} (49 acres)		
Savan	0.11 km^{2} (27 acres)		

=== Grenada ===
Carriacou and Petite Martinique is a dependency of Grenada and has a population of 10,900 people. Carriacou is the largest of the Grenadine chain. These islands contain:

Island	Area	Pop.	Capital
Southern Grenadines			
Carriacou	32.73 km^{2} (12.64 sq mi)	10,000	Hillsborough
Petite Martinique	2.37 km^{2} (590 acres)	900	North Village
Non-inhabited Islands			
Ronde Island	8.1 km^{2} (2,000 acres)		
Caille Island	1.62 km^{2} (400 acres)		
Saline Island	0.11 km^{2} (27 acres)		
Large Island	0.15 km^{2} (37 acres)		
Frigate Island	0.09 km^{2} (22 acres)		
Petite Dominique	0.05 km^{2} (12 acres)		
Fota	0.003 km^{2} (0.74 acres)		
