= Saint Vincent and the Grenadines =

Archipelagic country in the Caribbean

- Flag Coat of arms
- Motto: "Pax et Justitia" (Latin) "Peace and Justice"
- Anthem: "Saint Vincent, Land So Beautiful" Royal anthem: "God Save the King" (Note: As a Commonwealth realm, Saint Vincent and the Grenadines retains "God Save the King" as its royal anthem by precedent, with the song played on royal and vice-regal occasions.)
- Capital and largest city: Kingstown; 13°10′N 61°14′W
- Official languages: English
- Vernacular language: Vincentian Creole
- Ethnic groups (2020): 66% Afro-Caribbean; 19% Mixed; 6% Indian; 4% European; 2% Kalinago; 3% others
- Religion (2023 Census): 82.4% Christian; 26.4% Pentecostal; 11.6% Seventh-day Adventist; 10.5% Anglican; 9.9% Baptist; 4.4% Catholic; 19.6% Other Christians; 14.0% No religion; 0.8% Rastafari; 0.2% Other religions; 3.6% Not stated
- Demonyms: Vincentian; Grenadinian; Saint Vincentian
- Government: Constitutional monarchy
  - Monarch: Charles III
  - Governor-General: Sir Stanley John
  - Prime Minister: Godwin Friday
- Legislature: House of Assembly

Independence
  - Associated State: 27 October 1969
  - from the United Kingdom: 27 October 1979

Area
  - Total: 389 km^{2} (150 sq mi) (184th)
  - Water (%): negligible

Population
  - 2023 census: 109,296 (180th)
  - Density: 281/km^{2} (727.8/sq mi) (50th)
- GDP (PPP): 2023 estimate
  - Total: ▲$2 billion
  - Per capita: ▲$17,840
- GDP (nominal): 2023 estimate
  - Total: ▲$1 billion
  - Per capita: ▲$9,360
- HDI (2023): ▲0.798 high (76th)
- Currency: East Caribbean dollar (XCD)
- Time zone: UTC-4 (AST)
- Calling code: +1
- ISO 3166 code: VC
- Internet TLD: .vc

Saint Vincent and the Grenadines, (Note: /ˌɡrɛn.əˈdiːnz/; GREN-ə-DEENZ) sometimes known simply as Saint Vincent, is an archipelagic country in the eastern Caribbean. It is located in the southeast Windward Islands of the Lesser Antilles, which lie in the West Indies, at the southern end of the eastern border between the Caribbean Sea and the Atlantic Ocean. To the north lies Saint Lucia, to the east is Barbados and Grenada lies to the south.

Spanning a land area of 389 km^{2} (150 sq mi), most of its territory consists of the northernmost island of Saint Vincent, which includes the capital and largest city, Kingstown. To the south lie the northern two-thirds of the Grenadines, a chain of 32 smaller islands; the remaining southern third make up Grenada. Seven of the islands are inhabited, of which the largest and most populous are Bequia, Mustique, Canouan and Union Island. (Note: The remaining inhabited islands are Petit Saint Vincent, Palm Island, Mayreau; additionally, Young Island is an inhabited privately owned island. Uninhabited islands include Tobago Cays, Baliceaux, Battowia, Quatre, Petite Mustique, Savan and Petit Nevis.)

With a population of around 109,296, Saint Vincent and the Grenadines has a population density of 281 inhabitants/km^{2} (730 per sq mi). The majority of its people are descendants of enslaved Africans brought by France and then later Great Britain, which contested the islands during the 18th century. SVG remained a colony of the British Empire from 1783 until 1979, when it peacefully achieved independence; the country's culture, language, government and legal system reflect the long legacy of British rule. It is part of the Commonwealth of Nations and is a Commonwealth realm, with King Charles III as its official head of state.

Saint Vincent is a member of the Organisation of Eastern Caribbean States, CARICOM, the Bolivarian Alliance for the Americas, and the Community of Latin American and Caribbean States (CELAC).

In April 2021, the La Soufrière volcano erupted several times with "explosive events" continuing for two weeks, resulting in the evacuation of 16,000 residents. Assistance and emergency financial support was provided by several nearby islands, the United Kingdom, and agencies such as the United Nations. The first significant offer of long-term funding of US$20 million was announced on 13 April 2021 by the World Bank.

== Etymology ==
Christopher Columbus, the first European to reach the island, named it after St. Vincent of Saragossa (San Vicente de Zaragoza) whose feast day was on the day Columbus first saw it (22 January 1496). The name of the Grenadines refers to the Spanish city of Granada, but to differentiate it from the island of the same name, the diminutive was used. Before the arrival of the Spaniards, the Kalinago natives who inhabited the island of St. Vincent called it Youloumain, in honour of Youlouca, the spirit of the rainbows, whom they believed inhabited the island.

== History ==
=== Pre-colonial period ===
Saint Vincent was first inhabited by Indigenous people from South America around 5000 B.C. They were succeeded by the Arawaks around the 3rd century A.D., who were later displaced by the Kalinago in the 14th century. The Kalinago named the island Youloumain.

=== European arrival and early colonial period ===
It is thought that Christopher Columbus sighted the island in 1498, giving it the name St Vincent. The Kalinago people aggressively opposed European settlement on Saint Vincent.

=== French and British colonisation and First Carib War ===
Various attempts by the English and Dutch to claim the island proved unsuccessful, and it was the French who were first able to colonise the island, settling in the town of Barrouallie on the leeward side of St Vincent in 1719. The French imported Black slaves to work on plantations producing sugar, coffee, indigo, tobacco, cotton and cocoa.

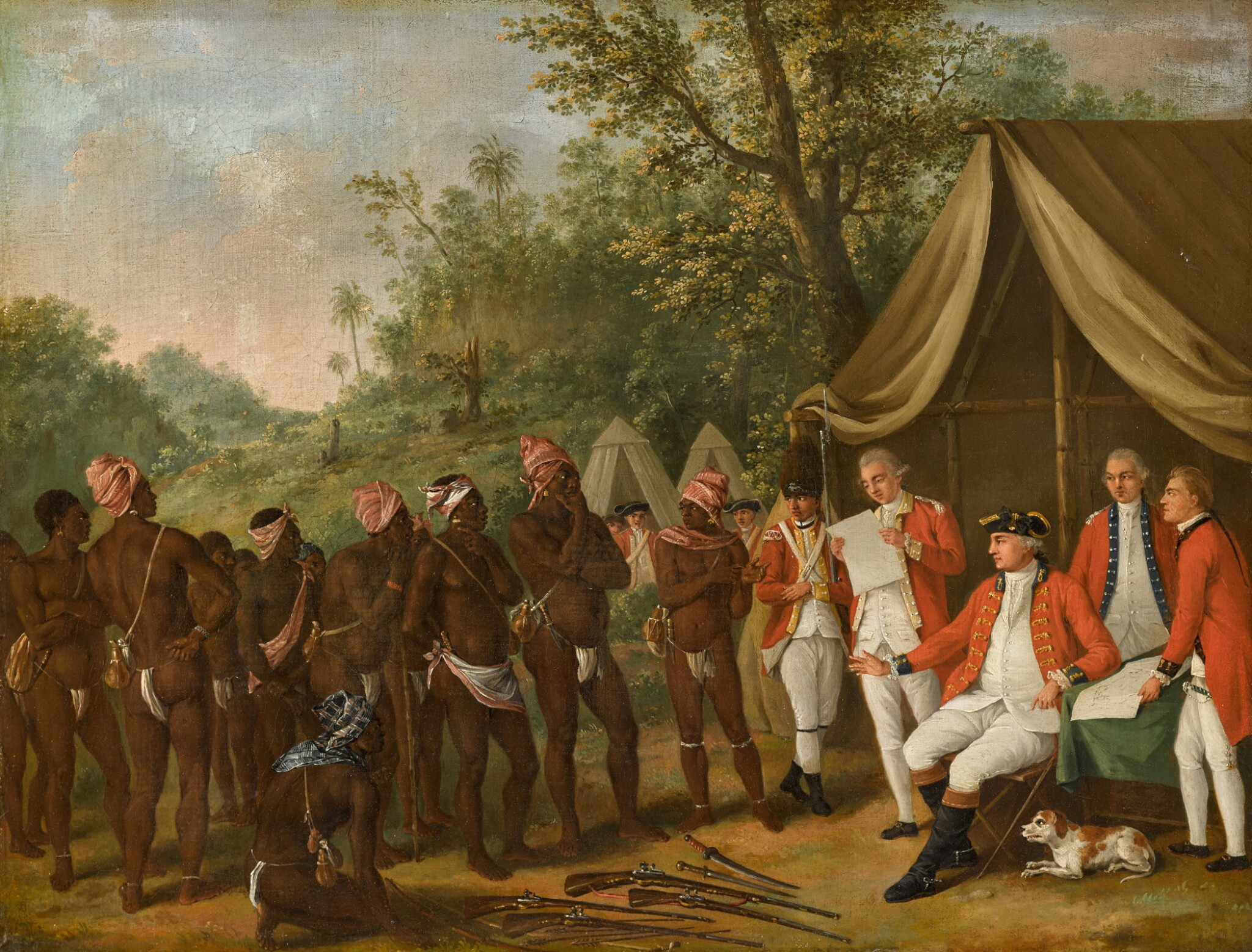
Depiction of the 1773 treaty negotiations between the British and the Garifuna

The British captured the island and drove out the French from Barrouallie during the Seven Years' War, a claim confirmed by the Treaty of Paris (1763). On taking control of the island in 1763, the British laid the foundations of Fort Charlotte and also continued the importation of slaves to work on the island's plantations. The Garifuna, an Afro-Indigenous creole people on the island, were opposed to the British presence and entered into open conflict against the British, starting the First Carib War, which lasted from 1772 to 1773.

During the Anglo-French War (1778–1783), the French recaptured St Vincent in 1779. However, the British regained control under the Treaty of Versailles (1783).

=== British colonial period and Second Carib War ===
The uneasy peace between the British and the Garifuna led to the Second Carib War, which lasted from 1795 to 1797. The Garifuna were led by paramount chief Joseph Chatoyer and supported by the French, notably Victor Hugues who was based on the island of Martinique. They were eventually defeated in 1797 by British forces under the command Sir Ralph Abercromby; a peace treaty agreement was made which resulted in almost 5,000 Garifuna being deported to Roatán, an island off the coast of Honduras, and to Belize and Baliceaux in the Grenadines.

In 1806, the construction of Fort Charlotte was completed.

The La Soufrière volcano erupted in 1812, resulting in considerable destruction.

Colonial flag (to 1979)

The British abolished slavery in Saint Vincent (as well as in all other British West Indies colonies) in 1834, and an apprenticeship period followed which ended in 1838. After its end, labour shortages on the plantations resulted, and were initially addressed by the immigration of indentured servants; starting from 1845, many Portuguese Catholic settlers arrived from Madeira, with around 2,100 arrivals from Portugal recorded from 1845 to 1850. Between 1861 and 1888, a new wave of immigration occurred, with shiploads of Indian labourers arriving.

=== 20th century ===
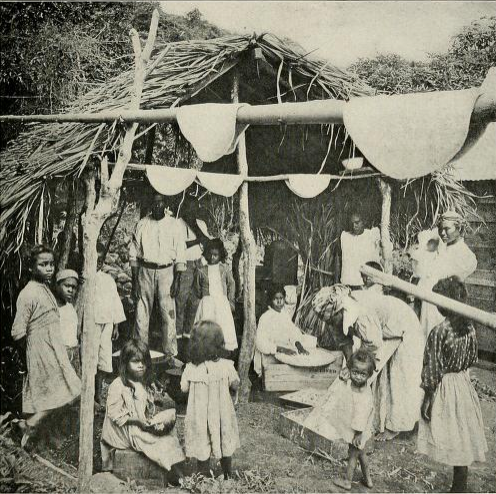
Residents of Saint Vincent making casabe (cassava bread) in the 1910s

In 1902, the La Soufrière volcano erupted again, killing 1,500–2,000 people; much farmland was damaged, and the economy deteriorated.

Saint Vincent and the Grenadines passed through various stages of colonial status under the British. A representative assembly was authorised in 1876, Crown Colony government was installed in 1877, a legislative council was created in 1925 with a limited franchise, and universal adult suffrage was granted in 1951. During the period of its control of Saint Vincent and the Grenadines, Britain made several attempts to unify the island with the other Windward Islands as a single entity, to simplify British control in the sub-region through a single unified administration. In the 1960s, the British again tried to unify all of its regional islands, including Saint Vincent, into a single politically unified entity under British control. The unification was to be called the West Indies Federation and was driven by a desire to gain independence from the British government. However, the attempt collapsed in 1962.

Saint Vincent was granted "associate statehood" status by Britain on 27 October 1969. This gave Saint Vincent complete control over its internal affairs but fell short of full independence in law.

In April 1979, La Soufrière erupted once more. Although no one was killed, thousands were evacuated and extensive agricultural damage occurred.

On 27 October 1979, Saint Vincent and the Grenadines gained full independence; the date is now the country's Independence Day, a public holiday. The country opted to remain within the Commonwealth of Nations, retaining the then-Queen Elizabeth II as Monarch, represented locally by a Governor-General.

=== Post-independence era ===
Milton Cato of the centre-left Saint Vincent Labour Party (SVLP) was the country's first Prime Minister (he had been Premier since 1974), ruling until his defeat in the 1984 Vincentian general election by James Fitz-Allen Mitchell of the centre-right New Democratic Party (NDP). During Cato's time in office, there was a brief rebellion on Union Island in December 1979 led by Lennox 'Bumba' Charles. Inspired by the recent revolution on Grenada, Charles alleged neglect of the Union by the central government. However, the revolt was swiftly put down and Charles was arrested. There were also a series of strikes in the early 1980s. James Mitchell remained Prime Minister for 16 years until 2000, winning three consecutive elections. Mitchell was at the forefront of attempts to improve regional integration. In 1980 and 1987, hurricanes damaged many banana and coconut plantations. Hurricane seasons were also very active in 1998 and 1999, with Hurricane Lenny in 1999 causing extensive damage to the west coast of the island.

In 2000, Arnhim Eustace became Prime Minister after taking over the leadership of the NDP following Mitchell's retirement; he was defeated a year later by Ralph Gonsalves of the Unity Labour Party (successor party to the SVLP). Gonsalves, a left-winger known in the country as "Comrade Ralph", argued that European nations owe Caribbean nations reparations for their role in the Atlantic slave trade. Gonsalves won a second term in 2005, a third in 2010, and a fourth in 2015.

In 2009, a referendum was held on a proposal to adopt a new constitution that would make the country a republic, replacing Queen Elizabeth II as head of state with a non-executive President, a proposal supported by Prime Minister Gonsalves. A two-thirds majority was required, but the referendum was defeated 29,019 votes (55.64 per cent) to 22,493 (43.13 per cent).

In November 2020, Ralph Gonsalves, Prime Minister of Saint Vincent and the Grenadines since 2001, made history by securing the fifth consecutive victory of his Unity Labour Party (ULP) in general election.

In 2021, on 9 April, the La Soufrière volcano erupted, sending ash several miles into the atmosphere. Approximately 16,000 people were evacuated in the days leading up to the eruption.

In the 2025 general election, Godwin Friday's NDP defeated Gonsalves' ULP, forming government by winning 14 out of 15 seats.

== Geography ==
A map of Saint Vincent and the Grenadines

Saint Vincent and the Grenadines lies to the west of Barbados, south of Saint Lucia and north of Grenada in the Windward Islands of the Lesser Antilles, an island arc of the Caribbean Sea. The islands of Saint Vincent and the Grenadines include the main island of Saint Vincent (344 km^{2} (133 sq mi)) and the northern two-thirds of the Grenadines (45 km^{2} (17 sq mi) in total), which are a chain of smaller islands stretching south from Saint Vincent to Grenada.

There are 32 islands and cays that make up St Vincent and the Grenadines (SVG). Nine are inhabited, including the mainland St Vincent and the Grenadines islands: Young Island, Bequia, Mustique, Canouan, Union Island, Mayreau, Petit St Vincent and Palm Island. Prominent uninhabited islands of the Grenadines include Petit Nevis, used by whalers, and Petit Mustique, which was the centre of a prominent real-estate scam in the early 2000s.

The capital of Saint Vincent and the Grenadines is Kingstown, Saint Vincent. The main island of Saint Vincent measures 26 km (16 mi) long, 15 km (9.3 mi) in width and 344 km^{2} (133 sq mi) in area. From the most northern to the most southern points, the Grenadine islands belonging to Saint Vincent span 60.4 km (37.5 mi), with a combined area of 45 km^{2} (17 sq mi).

The island of Saint Vincent is volcanic and heavily forested and includes little level ground. The windward side of the island is very rocky and steep, while the leeward side has more sandy beaches and bays. Saint Vincent's highest peak is La Soufrière volcano at 1,234 m (4,049 ft). Other major mountains on St Vincent are (from north to south) Richmond Peak, Mount Brisbane, Colonarie Mountain, Grand Bonhomme, Petit Bonhomme and Mount St Andrew.

The country is home to two terrestrial ecoregions: Windward Islands moist forests and the Lesser Antillean dry forests. It had a 2019 Forest Landscape Integrity Index mean score of 6.95/10, ranking it 61st globally out of 172 countries.

Most of Saint Vincent and the Grenadines lies within the Main Development Region for Atlantic tropical cyclones. Recently, in 2023, the islands were directly impacted by Tropical Storm Bret.

== Government and politics ==
Main office-holders

King of Saint Vincent and the Grenadines:
Charles III
since 8 September 2022

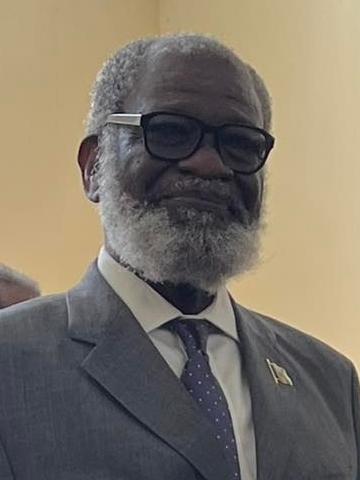
Governor-General of Saint Vincent and the Grenadines:
Stanley John
since 5 January 2026

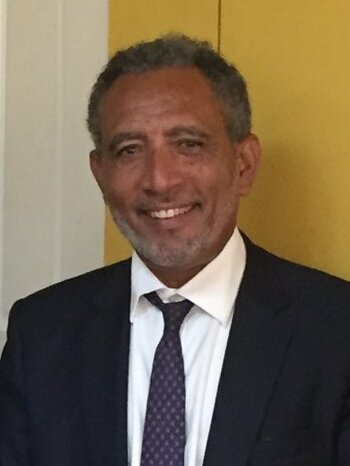
Prime Minister of Saint Vincent and the Grenadines:
Godwin Friday
since 28 November 2025

Saint Vincent and the Grenadines is a parliamentary democracy and constitutional monarchy, with Charles III as King of Saint Vincent and the Grenadines. He does not reside in the islands and is represented as head of state in the country by the Governor-General of Saint Vincent and the Grenadines, currently Stanley John (since 5 January 2026).

The office of Governor-General has mostly ceremonial functions including the opening of the islands' House of Assembly and the appointment of various government officials. Control of the government rests with the elected Prime Minister and their cabinet. The current Prime Minister is Godwin Friday, elected in 2025.

The legislative branch of government is the unicameral House of Assembly of Saint Vincent and the Grenadines, seating 15 elected members representing single-member constituencies and six appointed members known as Senators. The parliamentary term of office is five years, although the Prime Minister may call elections at any time.

The judicial branch of government is divided into district courts, the Eastern Caribbean Supreme Court and the Privy Council of the United Kingdom in London being the court of last resort.

=== Political culture ===
The two political parties with parliamentary representation are the New Democratic Party (NDP) and the Unity Labour Party (ULP). The parliamentary opposition is made up of the largest minority stakeholder in the general elections, headed by the Leader of the Opposition. The current opposition leader is Ralph Gonsalves.

=== Administrative divisions ===
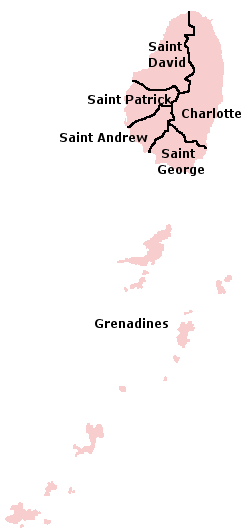
Map of the Parishes of Saint Vincent and the Grenadines

Administratively, Saint Vincent and the Grenadines is divided into six parishes. Five parishes are on Saint Vincent, while the sixth, Grenadines Parish, is made up of the northern two-thirds of the Grenadine islands. Kingstown is located in the Parish of Saint George and is the capital city and central administrative centre of the country.

For census purposes, however, Saint Vincent and the Grenadines is divided into thirteen census divisions, eleven of which are on Saint Vincent, and the other two comprising the Grenadines.

Parish	Area (km^{2})	Population (2000)	Capital
Charlotte Parish	149	38,000	Georgetown
Grenadines Parish	43	9,200	Port Elizabeth
Saint Andrew Parish	29	6,700	Layou
Saint David Parish	80	6,700	Chateaubelair
Saint George Parish	52	51,400	Kingstown
Saint Patrick Parish	37	5,800	Barrouallie

=== Foreign relations ===
==== International and regional relationships ====
Saint Vincent and the Grenadines maintains close ties to Canada, the United Kingdom and the US, and cooperates with regional political and economic organisations such as the Organisation of Eastern Caribbean States (OECS) and CARICOM. The island nation's sixth embassy overseas was opened on 8 August 2019 in Taipei, Taiwan, after Prime Minister Ralph Gonsalves's official visit to the Republic of China (Taiwan); the other five are located in London (a High Commission as Commonwealth countries have high commissions rather than embassies in each other's countries), Washington D.C., Havana, Caracas and Brussels.

===== The Double Taxation Relief (CARICOM) Treaty =====
On 6 July 1994 at Sherbourne Conference Centre in Barbados, a representative of the Government of St. Vincent and the Grenadines, James Mitchell signed the Double Taxation Relief (CARICOM) Treaties. There were seven other signatories to the agreement on that day. The countries which were represented were Antigua and Barbuda, Belize, Grenada, Jamaica, Saint Kitts and Nevis, Saint Lucia, and Trinidad and Tobago. An eighth country, Guyana signed the agreement on 19 August 2016. This treaty covered taxes, residence, tax jurisdictions, capital gains, business profits, interest, dividends, royalties and other areas.

===== FATCA =====
On 30 June 2014, St. Vincent and the Grenadines signed a Model 1 agreement with the United States of America with respect to Foreign Account Tax Compliance (Act) or FATCA. According to the updated site as of 16 January 2017, on 13 May 2016 the agreement went to "In Force" status.

===== International and regional bodies to which Saint Vincent and the Grenadines belong =====
Saint Vincent and the Grenadines is a member of the United Nations, the Commonwealth of Nations, the Organization of American States, and the Association of Caribbean States (ACS).

In September 2017, at the 72nd Session of the UN General Assembly, the Prime Ministers of the Solomon Islands, Tuvalu, Vanuatu and Saint Vincent and the Grenadines called for UN action on alleged human rights abuses committed by Indonesia on Western New Guinea's indigenous Papuans. In 2019, Saint Vincent and the Grenadines became the smallest country to ever be elected to the UN Security Council.

===== Organisation of American States =====
St Vincent and the Grenadines joined the Organisation of American States on 27 October 1981. It participates in the Summits of the Americas and the Indigenous Leaders’ Summits of Americas. In June 2022, St Vincent and the Grenadines boycotted the 9th Summit of the Americas.

==== European nations ====
In 2013, Saint Vincent called for European nations to pay reparations for the slave trade. Upon a visit in April 2022, the British Duke and Duchess of Edinburgh were confronted with protesters calling for reparations for Britain's participation in the slave trade. Among the protesters was Jomo Thomas, former chair of the St. Vincent and the Grenadines National Reparations Committee, who called for reparations from the former colonial power.

==== Venezuela ====
Saint Vincent protests against Venezuela's claim to give full effect to Aves (Bird) Island, which creates a Venezuelan EEZ/continental shelf extending over a large portion of the Caribbean Sea.

=== Military ===
Saint Vincent has no formal armed forces, although the Royal Saint Vincent and the Grenadines Police Force includes a Special Service Unit as well as a militia that has a supporting role on the island.

In 2017, Saint Vincent signed the UN treaty on the Prohibition of Nuclear Weapons.

=== LGBT rights ===
"Acts of gross indecency", which may be defined to include homosexual activity, are illegal in Saint Vincent and the Grenadines. Section 148 of the Criminal Code states:

Any person, who in public or private, commits an act of gross indecency with another person of the same sex, or procures or attempts to procure another person of the same sex to commit an act of gross indecency with him or her, is guilty of an offence and liable to imprisonment for five years.

== Economy ==
Agriculture, dominated by banana production, is the most important sector of this lower-middle-income economy. The services sector, based mostly on a growing tourist industry, is also important. The government has been relatively unsuccessful at introducing new industries, and the unemployment rate remains high at 19.8% in the 1991 census to 15% in 2001. The continuing dependence on a single crop represents the biggest obstacle to the islands' development as tropical storms wiped out substantial portions of bananas in many years.

There is a small manufacturing sector and a small offshore financial sector serving international businesses; its secrecy laws have caused some international concern. There are increasing demands for international financial services like stock exchange and financial intermediaries financial activities in the country. In addition, the natives of Bequia are permitted to hunt up to four humpback whales per year under IWC subsistence quotas.

=== Tourism ===
Tourist arrivals of 2024 in %

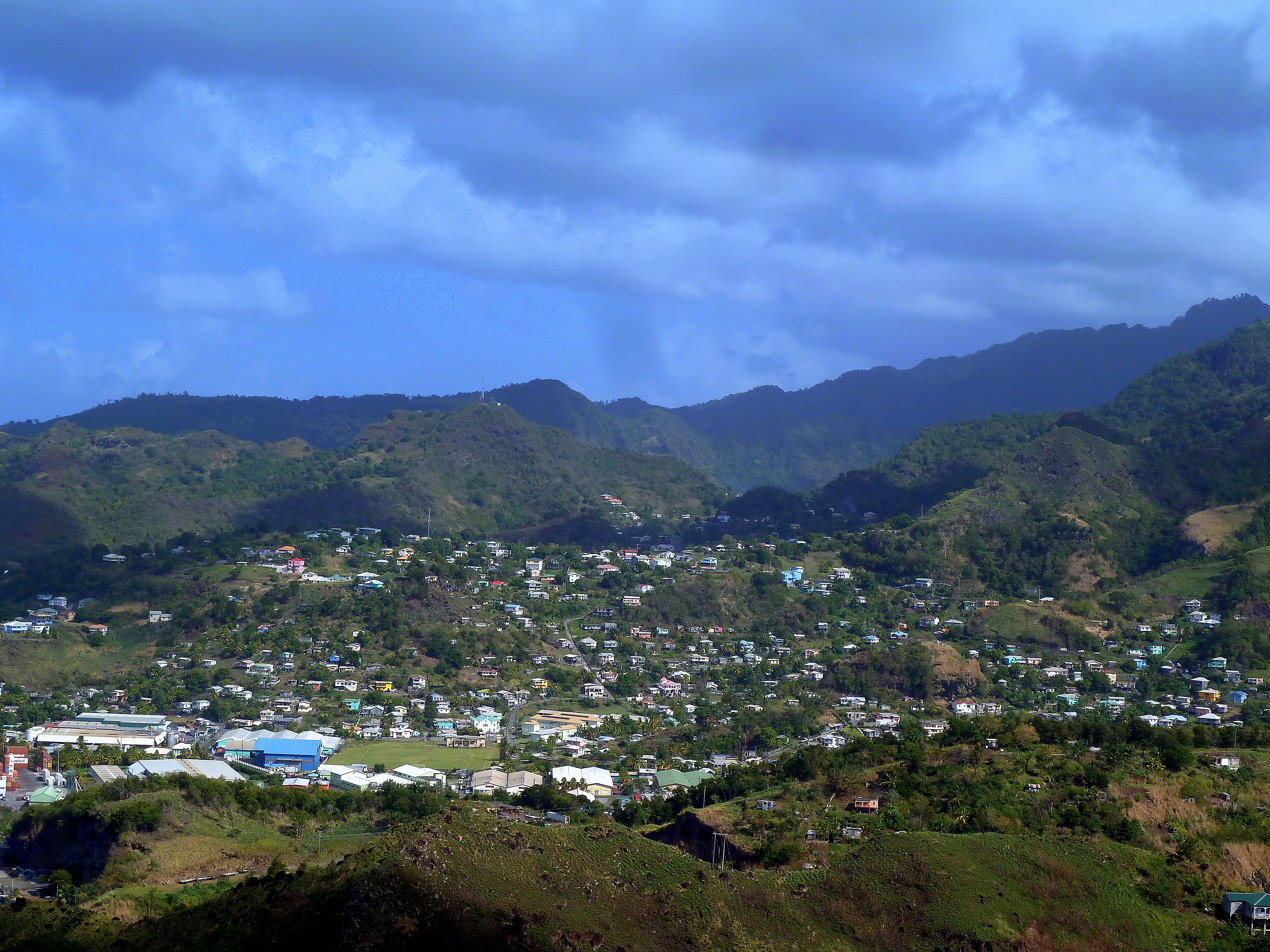
Campden Park, St. Vincent

The tourism sector has considerable potential for development. The filming of the Pirates of the Caribbean films on the island has helped to expose the country to more potential visitors and investors. Recent growth has been stimulated by strong activity in the construction sector and an improvement in tourism.

=== Transportation ===
Argyle International Airport is the country's new international airport. The new facility opened on 14 February 2017, replacing the existing E.T. Joshua Airport. The airport is on the island's east coast about 8.3 km (5.17 miles) from Kingstown.

=== Communications ===
In 2010, Saint Vincent and the Grenadines had 21,700 telephone land lines. Its land telephone system is fully automatic, covering the entire island and all of the inhabited Grenadine islands. In 2002, there were 10,000 mobile phones. By 2010, this number had increased to 131,800. Mobile phone service is available in most areas of Saint Vincent as well as the Grenadines.

Saint Vincent has two ISPs (Digicel, Flow) that provide cellular telephone and internet service.

== Demographics ==
The population as estimated in 2021 was 104,332. The ethnic composition was 66% African descent, 19% of mixed descent, 6% East Indian, 4% Europeans (mainly Portuguese), 2% Kalinago and 3% others. Most Vincentians are the descendants of West-Central African people brought to the island to work on plantations. There are other ethnic groups, such as Portuguese (from Madeira) and East Indians, both brought in to work on the plantations after the abolishing of slavery by the British living on the island. There is also a growing Chinese population.

=== Languages ===
English is the official language. Most Vincentians speak Vincentian Creole. English is used in education, government, religion, and other formal domains, while Creole (or 'dialect' as it is referred to locally) is used in informal situations, such as in the home and among friends.

=== Religion ===
Religion in Saint Vincent and the Grenadines (2023 Census)
1. Pentecostalism (26.4%)
2. Seventh-day Adventism (11.6%)
3. Anglicanism (10.5%)
4. Baptist (9.90%)
5. Other Christian denominations (9.00%)
6. Methodism (6.30%)
7. Catholicism (4.40%)
8. Evangelicalism (4.30%)
9. No religion (14.0%)
10. Not stated (3.60%)

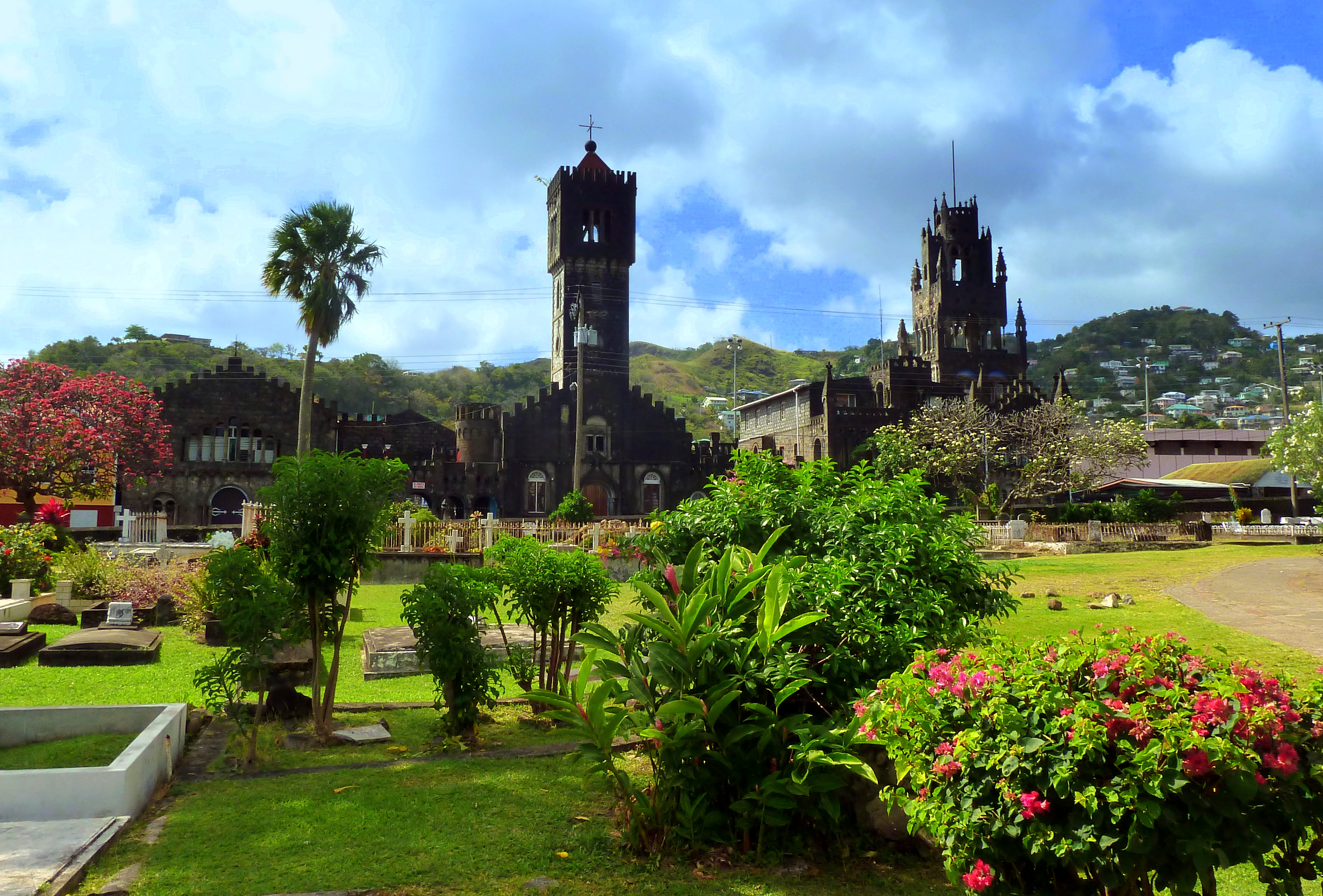
Assumption Cathedral, Kingstown

According to the 2023 census, 78.1% of the population of Saint Vincent and the Grenadines identified themselves as Christian, a modest decrease from 82.3% in 2012 census. The percentage of people with No religious affiliation nearly doubled from 7.5% in 2012 to 14.0% in 2023.

Though Christianity remains the dominant faith, the denominational composition of the country has changed drastically between 2001 and 2023. Traditional mainline churches like the Anglican, Methodist, and Catholic churches experienced steady declines, with Anglicans falling from 17.8% to 10.5%, Methodists from 10.9% to 6.3%, and Roman Catholics from 7.5% to 4.4%. Meanwhile, Pentecostalism grew substantially from 17.6% to 26.4%, becoming the largest Christian denomination in the country, Evangelicals almost doubled their share from 2.8% to 4.3%. Seventh-Day Adventists grow marginally from 10.2% to 11.6% of the population.

Rastafarianism is the largest non-Christian faith in the country followed by 0.8% of the population, a decline from 1.5% from 2001. Other minority faiths include Muslim whose share increased to 0.2% from 0.1 % and Hinduism, which remained largely unchanged at around 0.1% of the population in both censuses.

== Culture ==
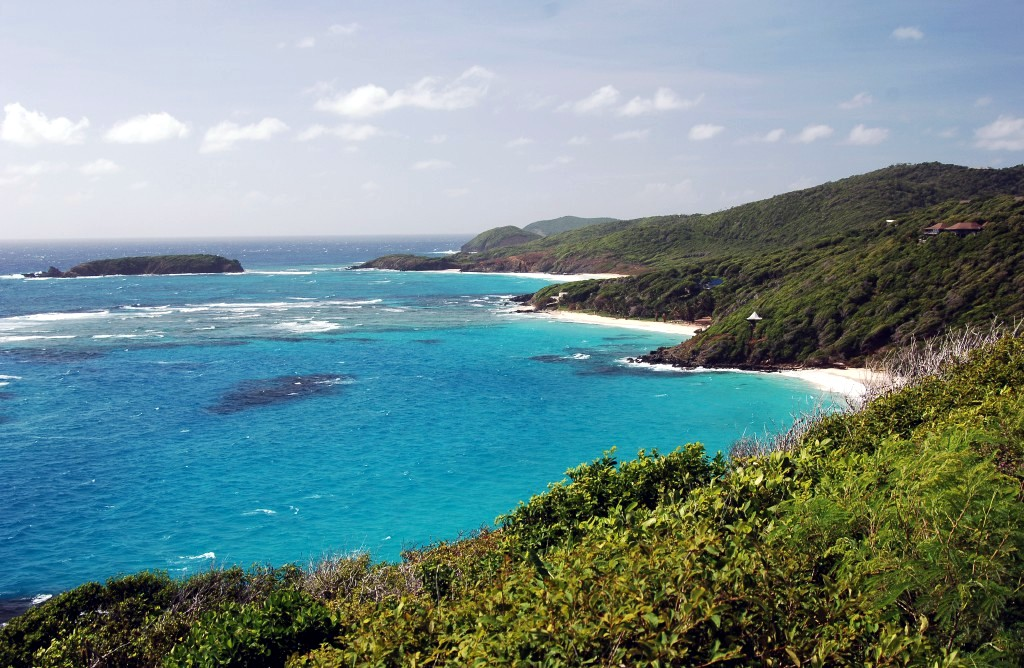
The island of Mustique in the Grenadines

=== Music ===
Music popular in Saint Vincent and the Grenadines includes big drum, calypso, soca, steelpan and reggae. String band music, quadrille and traditional storytelling are also popular. One of the most successful St Vincent natives is Kevin Lyttle. He was named Cultural Ambassador for the Island 19 September 2013. The national anthem of Saint Vincent and the Grenadines is "Saint Vincent, Land so beautiful", adopted upon independence in 1979.

=== Media ===
Saint Vincent has twelve FM radio stations: 88.9 Adoration Fm, 89.1 Jem Radio, 89.7 NBC Radio, 95.7 and 105.7 Praise FM, 96.7 Nice Radio, 97.1 Hot 97, 98.3 Star FM, 99.9 We FM, 103.7 Hitz, 102.7 EZee radio, 104.3 Xtreme FM and 106.9 Boom FM. There are several Internet radio stations including Chronicles Christian Radio. It has one television broadcast station ZBG-TV (SVGTV) and one cable television provider.

St Vincent and the Grenadines Broadcasting Corporation is the parent company for SVGTV, Magic 103.7.

=== Sport ===
Cricket, association football, and athletics are most popular among men whereas netball is most popular among women. Basketball, volleyball, rugby and tennis are also very popular.

The country's prime football league is the NLA Premier League, which provides its national (association) football team with most players. A notable Vincentian footballer is Ezra Hendrickson, former national team captain who played at several Major League Soccer clubs in the United States and was head coach with the Chicago Fire FC from 2021–23.

The country regularly participates at the Caribbean Basketball Championship where a men's team and a women's team compete. Saint Vincent and the Grenadines also has its own national rugby union team which is ranked 84th in the world. Other notable sports played at the regional level include track and field. Natasha Mayers won a gold medal in the 100m at the 2010 Commonwealth Games. Kineke Alexander won a bronze medal in the women's [400m] at the 2015 Pan American Games. Eswort Coombs got a bronze medal in the 400m at the 1995 Pan American Games.

At the Olympics Games France 2024, Saint Vincent and the Grenadines had two athletes, Shafiqua Maloney and Handal Roban. Maloney became the first Vincentian athlete to reach the final stage of an Olympic event when she placed 4th in the women's 800m.

=== Holidays ===
Public holidays of Saint Vincent and the Grenadines
Date	Name in English
1 January	New Year's Day
14 March	National Heroes' Day
15 April	Good Friday
18 April	Easter Monday
1 May	Labour Day
6 June	Whit Monday
8 July	Carnival Monday
1 August	Emancipation Day
27 October	Independence Day
25 December	Christmas Day
26 December	Boxing Day

== See also ==
- Outline of Saint Vincent and the Grenadines
- Index of Saint Vincent and the Grenadines-related articles
