= List of cities, towns and villages in Saint Vincent and the Grenadines =

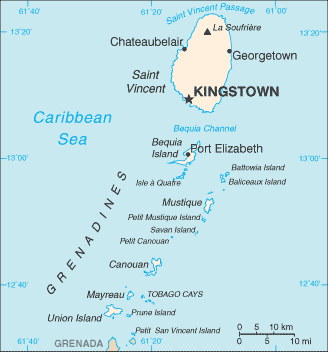
Map of the Saint Vincent and the Grenadines

This is a list of cities, towns and villages in Saint Vincent and the Grenadines:

Name	Coordinates	Parish	Island
Adelphi	13°11′37″N 061°08′25″W	Charlotte	Saint Vincent
Arnos Vale	13°08′33″N 061°12′34″W	Saint George	Saint Vincent
Ashton	12°35′41″N 061°26′05″W	Grenadines	Union Island
Barrouallie	13°14′09″N 061°16′19″W	Saint Patrick	Saint Vincent
Bednoe	12°57′N 061°15′W	Grenadines	Quatre
Belmont	13°09′49″N 061°10′48″W	Saint George	Saint Vincent
Biabou	13°11′52″N 061°08′18″W	Charlotte	Saint Vincent
Bridgetown			Saint Vincent
Brighton Village	13°07′57″N 061°10′27″W	Saint George	Saint Vincent
Brittania Bay		Grenadines	Mustique
Buccament			Saint Vincent
Byera Hill	13°15′33″N 061°07′05″W	Charlotte	Saint Vincent
Byera Village	13°15′24″N 061°07′33″W	Charlotte	Saint Vincent
Calder			Saint Vincent
Calliaqua	13°07′51″N 061°11′34″W	Saint George	Saint Vincent
Camden Park	13°10′21″N 061°14′29″W	Saint Andrew	Saint Vincent
Cane Garden	13°08′46″N 061°13′15″W	Saint George	Saint Vincent
Carriere Village			Saint Vincent
Chapmans	13°17′N 061°07′W	Charlotte	Saint Vincent
Charlestown	12°42′03″N 061°19′53″W	Grenadines	Canouan
Chateaubelair	13°17′18″N 061°14′25″W	Saint David	Saint Vincent
Chauncey	13°10′N 061°14′W	Saint Andrew	Saint Vincent
Cheltenham	12°53′N 061°11′W	Grenadines	Mustique
Clare Valley	13°10′N 061°15′W	Saint Andrew	Saint Vincent
Clifton	12°35′45″N 061°25′07″W	Grenadines	Union Island
Colonarie	13°14′36″N 061°08′09″W	Charlotte	Saint Vincent
Cumberland	13°15′44″N 061°15′07″W	Saint Patrick	Saint Vincent
Derrick	12°59′N 061°15′W	Grenadines	Bequia
Diamond Village	13°14′N 061°08′W	Charlotte	Saint Vincent
Dovers	12°53′N 061°11′W	Grenadines	Mustique
Dubois	13°11′N 061°14′W	Saint Andrew	Saint Vincent
Edinboro	13°09′35″N 061°14′11″W	Saint Andrew	Saint Vincent
Enhams			Saint Vincent
Evesham			Saint Vincent
Fancy	13°22′N 061°10′W	Charlotte	Saint Vincent
Fountain			Saint Vincent
Francois	13°12′N 061°13′W	Saint Andrew	Saint Vincent
Friendly	13°13′41″N 061°07′45″W	Charlotte	Saint Vincent
Friendship	12°59′N 061°14′W	Grenadines	Bequia
Georgetown	13°17′14″N 061°07′48″W	Charlotte	Saint Vincent
Gomea			Saint Vincent
Greathead	13°08′39″N 061°13′15″W	Saint George	Saint Vincent
Green Hill		Saint George	Saint Vincent
Greiggs	13°12′18″N 061°09′33″W	Charlotte	Saint Vincent
Hermitage	13°14′N 061°13′W	Saint Patrick	Saint Vincent
Keartons			Saint Vincent
Kingstown (capital)	13°09′28″N 061°13′30″W	Saint George	Saint Vincent
Kingstown Park			Saint Vincent
La Croix			Saint Vincent
Lauders			Saint Vincent
Layou	13°12′12″N 061°16′07″W	Saint Patrick; Saint Andrew	Saint Vincent
Liberty Lodge	13°09′57″N 061°13′54″W	Saint Andrew	Saint Vincent
Lodge (Lodge Village)			Saint Vincent
Lovell Village	12°52′57″N 061°11′16″W	Grenadines	Mustique
Lowmans Hill			Saint Vincent
Lowmans Windward			Saint Vincent
Mesopotamia	13°10′N 061°10′W	Charlotte	Saint Vincent
Montrose	13°10′N 061°14′W	Saint Andrew	Saint Vincent
Mount Grennan			Saint Vincent
New Ground			Saint Vincent
New Sandy Bay Village	13°21′08″N 061°07′53″W	Charlotte	Saint Vincent
North Union	13°13′04″N 061°08′08″W	Charlotte	Saint Vincent
O'Briens Valley			Saint Vincent
Old Wall	12°38′19″N 061°23′38″W	Grenadines	Mayreau
Orange Hill (Overland)	13°18′50″N 061°07′45″W	Charlotte	Saint Vincent
Owia	13°22′31″N 061°08′35″W	Charlotte	Saint Vincent
Paget Farm	12°59′N 061°15′W	Grenadines	Bequia
Park Hill			Saint Vincent
Paul Over			Saint Vincent
Pembroke	13°11′N 061°15′W	Saint Andrew	Saint Vincent
Penniston			Saint Vincent
Peruvian Vale	13°10′37″N 061°08′45″W	Charlotte	Saint Vincent
Peter's Hope			Saint Vincent
Petit Bordel			Saint Vincent
Port Elizabeth	13°00′40″N 061°14′04″W	Grenadines	Bequia
Prospect			Saint Vincent
Queen's Drive			Saint Vincent
Questelles	13°10′N 061°14′W	Saint Andrew	Saint Vincent
Rabacca	13°18′N 061°09′W	Charlotte	Saint Vincent
Redemption	13°09′52″N 061°13′46″W	Saint Andrew	Saint Vincent
Ribishi	13°08′53″N 061°11′06″W	Saint George	Saint Vincent
Richland Park	13°11′59″N 061°10′00″W	Charlotte	Saint Vincent
Richmond	13°18′N 061°13′W	Saint David	Saint Vincent
Richmond Hill			Saint Vincent
Richmond Vale	13°17′41″N 061°14′02″W	Saint David	Saint Vincent
Rillan Hill			Saint Vincent
Rose Bank	13°17′05″N 061°15′13″W	Saint David	Saint Vincent
Rose Hall	13°16′13″N 061°14′25″W	Saint David	Saint Vincent
Rutland Vale	13°12′N 061°17′W	Saint Patrick	Saint Vincent
Sandy Bay			Saint Vincent
Sans Souci	13°13′N 061°07′W	Charlotte	Saint Vincent
Sharps			Saint Vincent
Sion Hill			Saint Vincent
South Rivers	13°14′N 061°08′W	Charlotte	Saint Vincent
Spring Village	13°15′N 061°14′W	Saint Patrick	Saint Vincent
Stubbs	13°08′57″N 061°09′35″W	Saint George	Saint Vincent
Troumaka (Troumaca)	13°16′54″N 061°15′25″W	Saint David	Saint Vincent
Turema	13°19′15″N 061°08′38″W	Charlotte	Saint Vincent
Vermont	13°12′N 061°13′W	Saint Andrew	Saint Vincent
Villa			Saint Vincent
Wallibou	13°19′N 061°13′W	Saint David	Saint Vincent
Waterloo	13°17′57″N 061°08′30″W	Charlotte	Saint Vincent

== See also ==
- Parishes of Saint Vincent and the Grenadines
- Grenadines Parish#Islands
- Grenadines#Saint Vincent and the Grenadines
- Geography of Saint Vincent and the Grenadines#Table of Islands
