= Gertrude Protain =

Vincentian/Grenadian educator, politician, and tourism expert (1914–2005)

- Born: Gertrude Isabel Blackman; 8 July 1914; Edinboro, Saint Andrew Parish on the island of Saint Vincent in Saint Vincent and the Grenadines
- Died: 14 May 2005 (aged 90); Grenada
- Other names: Gert Protain
- Occupations: Teacher, politician, tourism director
- Years active: 1933-1992
- Known for: Women's rights and tourism development
- Spouse(s): Errol Protain, m. 1940
- Children: 1

Gertrude Protain MBE (8 July 1914 – 14 May 2005) was a Vincentian/Grenadian educator, politician, and tourism expert, as well as one of the influential feminists working in the Caribbean in her era. She was the first woman to serve on the Legislative Council of Grenada and became the island's "First Lady of Tourism".

== Early life ==
Gertrude Isabel Blackman was born on 8 July 1914 in Edinboro, Saint Andrew Parish on the island of Saint Vincent, in Saint Vincent and the Grenadines, to Victoria Isabel and Joseph Elliot Blackman. Her father was a teacher and an inspector for the Windward Islands schools. Blackman was educated in Kingstown, attending the St. Vincent Girls' High School and soon after her graduation, her family relocated to the nearby island of Grenada.

== Career ==
Upon arriving in Grenada in 1933, Blackman began teaching at the Church of England High School, now the Anglican High School. On 8 August 1940, Blackman married Errol Protain and they subsequently had one son, Gary, who would become a noted pianist. During this same time, Protain worked as a broadcaster for media, creating a series of radio episodes, "Mainy for Women", to air on the Windward Islands Broadcasting Station. After enjoying twenty-five years in teaching, she left the field.

Protain was one of the founding members of the Soroptomist Club, an organization for business and professional women to provide worldwide volunteer services for the improvement of the lives of women and girls. Protain, along with other feminists including Grenadian Louise Rowley, Jamaican Una Marson, and Trinidadians Beatrice Greig and Audrey Jeffers led the spread of feminism throughout the Caribbean. In 1957, Protain became the first woman nominated to the Grenadian Legislative Council, serving on the Education and Social Services Committee. The following year, she acted as a delegate for Grenada in the launching of the Parliament of the West Indies Federation. Her four years of work on the Education Committee stressed the education of women and Protain pressed for scholarships for girls and their higher education opportunities.

In 1960, Protain became the executive secretary of the Grenada Board of Tourism and the following year she co-founded the Grenada Hotel Association, as a means of solving industry issues and creating networks for common interests. She was honoured in 1968 with the Order of the British Empire. Protain attended several international exhibits to promote Grenadian products to markets abroad and in 1978, led the delegation for the Calgary Stampede trade exhibition, in which Greneda took first prize. After two decades of service, Protain retired, only to return four years later to work for the Ministry of Tourism as the government's cruise administrator. This was the period immediately following the US-led Invasion of Grenada and news of the event led to an upsurge in interest about the island. Protain organized tourism seminars for taxi drivers and street vendors so that they were able to provide high quality service and were knowledgeable about the island.

Protain retired from government service in 1986, to work as a marketing manager for the firm of George F. Huggins, an international shipping firm. She worked diligently to have Grenada included in the routes of the Carnival Cruise Lines and successfully overcame their hesitation to add Grenada to their itinerary in 1991, earning the acclaim as the island's "First Lady of Tourism". Receiving many accolades and honours, Protain was the appointed MBE in the 1968 Birthday Honours, recipient of the Grenada Board of Tourism Award (1990), the Grenada Independence Award (1995), the 35th Anniversary Award of the Grenada Hotel Association (1996), as well as the Grenada Silver Jubilee Certificate of Honour (1999). In 2004, Shadel Nyack Compton wrote Gertrude Protain: Glimpses into the Life of a Great Grenadian, which was published by the Belmont Estate Heritage Foundation to recognize Protain's contributions to her homeland.

== Death and legacy ==
Protain died in May 2005, in Grenada. In 2010, she was profiled in the University of the West Indies publication Women in Grenadian History, 1783–1983.
