= Cumberland, Saint Vincent and the Grenadines =

Cumberland
- Location in Saint Vincent and the Grenadines
- Coordinates: 13°15′44″N 061°15′07″W
- Country: Saint Vincent and the Grenadines
- Island: Saint Vincent
- Parish: Saint Patrick

Cumberland is a village in Saint Vincent and the Grenadines. It is located in the west of the main island of Saint Vincent, between the towns of Barrouallie and Chateaubelair, and just to the south of the small settlement of Troumaka.
