= Gema Ramkeesoon =

Trinidadian social worker and womans right activist (1910 - 1999)

Gema Ramkeesoon MBE HBM
- Ramkeesoon at a Republic Day celebration in 1960, from Ebony
- Born: Gema Wellesley Julumsingh; 1910; Curepe, Trinidad and Tobago
- Died: 1 March 1999; Port of Spain, Trinidad and Tobago
- Other name: Gemma Ramkeesoon
- Occupations: social worker, women's rights activist
- Years active: 1926–1986

Gema Ramkeesoon MBE HBM (née Julumsingh; 1910-1 March 1999) was a Trinidadian and Tobagonian social worker and women's rights activist who was one of the early pioneers of the women's movement in Trinidad and Tobago. She was honored for her social service work as a member of the Order of the British Empire in 1950 and received the gold Hummingbird Medal from Trinidad and Tobago in 1976.

== Early life ==
Gema Wellesley Julumsingh, a mixed race Trinidadian, was born in 1910 in Curepe, when Trinidad was part of the British West Indies to Florence (née Arindell) and Julumsingh, an educated man of Indian heritage. Her mother, of White Scottish and Afro-Caribbean heritage died when she was around two years old and her father sent Gema and her younger sister to live with her maiden aunt, Ada Arindell, in Newtown, Port of Spain. She attended a private elementary school, run by Miss Moore and took violin lessons. At age thirteen, she began attending Bishop Anstey High School, where she passed her Junior Cambridge Examination, earning a distinction in geography. She left school at fifteen and married at All Saints Church in Port of Spain the following year, with John Dyal Ramkeesoon, a priest at St Agnes Anglican Church in Saint James.

== Career ==
Influenced during her schooling by Beatrice Greig, a white activist, but one who spoke about the empowerment of Indo-Trinidadian women, Ramkeesoon became involved in the Cedros Bees, in 1926. The group was a mentoring program for young girls. After her marriage, as the wife of a clergyman, she was required to assist in parish activities. Joining the Mother's Union, she became the first local president of the organization. She joined the Coterie of Social Workers, founded by Audrey Jeffers and was one of the few woman of Indo-Trinidadian descent involved in the organization. Ramkeesoon worked to improve the relationship between Afro-Caribbean and Indo-Caribbean women, as both groups were often ignored by mainstream feminist groups. The group participated in campaigns for women’s right to education, public office, and divorce, but also provided community assistance to those in need, such as establishing homes for the blind and school feeding programs.

Ramkeesoon campaigned against discrimination based on skin color, a distinct prejudice from racism as it is based on biases against people of varying shades within their own racially identified communities, and in 1949 co-founded the Indo-Caribbean Cultural Council with Patrick Solomon, to find means for the two largest ethnic groups in the country to work together. She participated in and led social work conferences internationally; such as the 1949 Social Welfare Conference held in Jamaica, the 1950 Anglican World Conclave in London, and the 1953 Bridgetown meeting of the Barbados Women's Alliance, which she chaired. Ramkeesoon was in favor of regional cooperation and was a proponent of the development of the Federation of Social Welfare Workers in 1950, proposed to unite women across the British West Indies in their projects to improve their communities. In 1956, she was one of the women considered for appointment to the Senate of the West Indies Federation.

Among her many contributions, Ramkeesoon served as chair of the Women's Prison Visiting Committee; was Executive Director of the YWCA; served as a president of the Women's Corona Society; was the secretary of St. Mary's Home in Tacarigua and of the Day Nursery Association; and served as secretary and treasurer of Bishops Centenary College of Port of Spain She was honored as a member of the Order of the British Empire in 1950 and was awarded the golden Hummingbird Medal from Trinidad and Tobago in 1976 for her social service work. In 1989 the Oral and Pictorial Records Programme of the University of the West Indies selected her as one of the pioneers of the women's movement to be interviewed. The five audio cassettes of the interview conducted by Maureen Cain are held in the Alma Jordan Library, on the St. Augustine campus of the University of the West Indies.

== Death and legacy ==
Ramkeesoon died on 1 March 1999. In 2013, she was honored by the University of the West Indies at its 20th Anniversary Conference on Gender Transformations in the Caribbean as one of the pioneers of feminism and human rights activism in the region.
