= Valcina Ash =

- Born: c. 1939; Layou
- Occupation: Politician
- Awards: Member of the Order of the British Empire

Valcina Agatha Ash MBE (born c. 1939) is a Vincentian politician. She is the second woman and the first Vincentian-born woman to be elected to House of Assembly of Saint Vincent and the Grenadines.

Valcina Ash was born in Layou, Saint Vincent. She worked as a schoolteacher there until marrying and moving to Barrouallie, where she ran a general store. Her husband died in 1972, leaving her to raise four children. She helped found a local women's group which supported women in the community and aided evacuees of the 1979 La Soufrière eruption.

Following independence, she was appointed in 1979 to the House of Assembly as a senator with the Saint Vincent Labour Party. After the death of A. T. Woods, in 1983 she ran in a special election to fill his seat, representative of Central Leeward in the House of Assembly, winning by only 65 votes. The next year, she lost the general election.

In 2006, she was awarded Member of the Order of the British Empire for "services to business and the community".
