= Rose Bank =

- Location in Saint Vincent and the Grenadines
- Coordinates: 13°17′05″N 061°15′13″W
- Country: Saint Vincent and the Grenadines
- Island: Saint Vincent
- Parish: Saint David

Rose Bank is a town in Saint David Parish in Saint Vincent and the Grenadines. It is located on the west coast of the main island of Saint Vincent, to the north of Kingstown, just to the west of Chateaubelair, and northwest of Rose Hall.
