= Leslie Lett =

Leslie Alexander Lett was an Anglican priest in the second half of the twentieth century.

He was educated at Laurentian University and Codrington College, Barbados; and ordained in 1960. After curacies in Antigua and St Kitts he was Priest in charge of St George Montserrat. After this he held incumbencies in Barbados before becoming Dean of St. George's Cathedral, Kingstown St Vincent, a post he held from 1974 to 1977.
