= Admiralty Bay, Bequia =

Coordinates: 13°0′N 61°15′W

Admiralty Bay

Admiralty Bay is the largest bay on the coast of the island of Bequia, in Saint Vincent and the Grenadines.

The bay encompasses over a third of the island's west coast, stretching 4 km from the island's south-eastern tip. The island's main settlement, Port Elizabeth, is situated in the bay's north-east and extends around the bay's edge. The settlement of Lower Bay is located on the southern part of the bay.

The edge of the bay is the site of several beaches, notably Princess Margaret Beach to the south of Port Elizabeth. The waters at the edge of the bay are popular with divers.

The bay was an important haven during the early years of European colonisation, as it was a safe place to anchor during hurricane season. It was also the site of freshwater springs and nearby forested land, and soon attracted shipwrights and chandlers, and became a hub for local trade. It remains the island's main harbour for pleasure craft, and also contains a deep harbour in the north for visiting ships.

An image of the bay is featured on the reverse of the 2019 East Caribbean ten-dollar bill.
