= Saint Patrick Parish =

Saint Patrick Parish may refer to:

- Saint Patrick Parish, New Brunswick, Canada
- Saint Patrick Parish, Dominica
- Saint Patrick Parish, Grenada
- Saint Patrick Parish, Saint Vincent and the Grenadines
