= Vermont, Saint Vincent and the Grenadines =

Vermont
- Location in Saint Vincent and the Grenadines
- Coordinates: 13°12′N 061°13′W
- Country: Saint Vincent and the Grenadines
- Island: Saint Vincent
- Parish: Saint Andrew

Vermont is a town in Saint Andrew Parish of Saint Vincent and the Grenadines. It is located in the inland southwest of the main island of Saint Vincent, north of Kingstown and east of Layou.
