= Rose Hall =

Rose Hall may refer to:

- Rose Hall, New York City, a concert hall as part of Jazz at Lincoln Center.
- Rose Hall, Guyana, a town in Guyana
- Rose Hall, Saint Vincent and the Grenadines, a village in Saint Vincent and the Grenadines
- Rose Hall, Oxford, a historic building, now part of St Peter's College, Oxford
- Rose Hall, Montego Bay, the great house of the Rose Hall Plantation near Montego Bay, Jamaica, a tourist destination and setting of the legend of the White Witch of Rose Hall
- Rose Hall Beach, Jamaica
