= Coterie of Social Workers =

Women's organization in Trinidad and Tobago

The Coterie of Social Workers is a women's organization, established in 1921 in Trinidad and Tobago, British West Indies to engage in empowering women as well as providing benevolent assistance to the poor and disadvantaged. It was the first organization to target for membership, middle-class women of colour and focus on the needs of working class women, regardless of their marital status and was the leading women's organization in the country from its establishment through the 1940s. Though it has branches throughout the country, its headquarters is located at 3 Longden Street in Port of Spain.

== History ==
In 1921, Audrey Jeffers, an educated, middle-class Afro-Trinidiadian teacher recognized that the needs of her students were far greater than education. She founded the Coterie of Social Workers in Port of Spain to help with their health and welfare needs. Prior to forming the organisation, assistance to the disadvantaged was provided solely by upper-class white and coloured women and focused mainly toward assisting women to become better wives. Jeffers believed the focus of assistance should be on working class women and their children, regardless of their marital status, and she recruited like minded women to engage in the work of the Coterie. The organisation was headquartered in Briarsend, at the end of Briar Street in the Saint Clair district, and held fundraising events to raise money for improvement projects. In 1926, they opened a school lunch program in Newtown, which provided free meals and became known as the "Breakfast Shed". Quickly the need for providing nutritious meals spread and other sheds were established. By 1934, there were locations in Barataria, on Edward Street in the center of Port of Spain, in San Fernando, Siparia and on Tobago.

The Coterie continued expanding services to assist the less advantaged and raise the status of middle class women of colour, but focused primarily on black women. One of the few exceptions was Afro- and Indo-Trinidadian, social worker and Coterie member, Gema Ramkeesoon, who campaigned for cooperation among various ethnic groups, as well as against shadism. In addition to providing homes for the blind and elderly, the Coterie pressed for higher education for girls and employment opportunities for middle class women. They sought reform of laws to address illegitimacy and alimony, and pressed to change laws which barred women from participating in governmental boards and councils, or serving as jurors. The Coterie would be the leading women's rights organization for middle-class women in Trinidad and Tobago from the 1920s to the 1940s.

In 1936, the Coterie hosted a conference in Port of Spain and invited social workers from throughout the British West Indies and British Guiana. Marking the 15th anniversary of the Coterie, the conference held from 30 April to 10 May, aimed to promote regional cooperation between women involved in social welfare projects to improve educational, social and political spheres for women. The same year that this conference occurred, the government was taking steps to limit women's roles, passing legislation in Trinidad to ban married women as teachers. A few years later, they barred women from working at night, in an attempt to curtail them from being away from their primary duty of caring for their children. At the conference, women such as Jeffers, Beatrice Greig, Jessie Masson, and Gertie Wood spoke about women's intellectual capacity, their subordination and suppression, and the need for women to become educated and press for their right to be included in social and political structures. The conference was notable in that it did not allow men to speak throughout the majority of the sessions and that Jeffers emphasized that the government was failing in its obligation to address the needs of citizens.

At the conclusion of the conference the public opinion was mixed, with some sectors understanding the problem of unequal policies for men and women, while others blamed women for their lack of action to improve their situation. The conference, however, marked a turning point. Following the conference, Jeffers ran for a seat on the Port of Spain City Council and won the first seat ever awarded to a woman in the country. The following year in Jamaica, Amy Bailey and Mary Morris Knibb formed the Women's Liberal Club, along the lines of the Coterie, which focused on improving socio-economic and political status for middle class women of colour. In 1938, the Coterie submitted a response to the West India Royal Commission enquiry calling for reform of education systems which did not allow girls to compete for Island Scholarships, did not provide vocational training, had no adult education programs to train women, and did not provide nursery schools, among other issues. They also pointed out the need for measures to prevent employment discrimination on the basis of color and gender, to facilitate forming of trade unions to protect women and girls, the need for women police officers to deal with women offenders and reform of child support laws.

In 1940, the Coterie opened its first day nursery, called Cipriani House, in Laventille and In the 1940s and 1950s, working with the Child Welfare League, the Day Nursery Association, the League of Women Voters and the Union of Women Citizens, the Coterie instigated the establishment of National Health Centers. Attending government meetings, Parliament sessions and lectures from health professionals, the women pressed to have health services available throughout Trinidad and Tobago.

== Present ==
The organisational headquarters is now located at 3 Longden Street in Port of Spain and celebrated its 85th year of operation in 2007 at which time, complaints surfaced that the house at 22 Sweet Briar Road, the original site of the Coterie, was in disrepair. It was restored and is now a Cultural Heritage Site. The organization continues to provide food through its meal centers, located throughout the island.
