= Beatrice Greig =

Trinidadian writer and activist (born 1869)

- Born: 1869; St. John's, Newfoundland, Canada
- Died: Trinidad and Tobago
- Occupations: Social worker, women's rights activist
- Years active: 1920-1940s

Beatrice Greig (born 1869 - date of death unknown) was a Trinidadian writer, editor and women's rights activist in the period between 1900 and 1940. She was one of the most influential voices for women's civil, economic and political equality during this time frame. She was one of the first women to run in an election in Trinidad.

== Biography ==
Greig was born in 1869 in St. John's, Newfoundland, Canada. She moved with her missionary Scottish parents to Trinidad at the age of sixteen and then studied in India, becoming exposed to the ideas of theosophy and Katherine Mayo's work on the subjugation of Indian women. Returning to Trinidad, in 1891, she married William Greig and took up residence on his Cedros Estate. Widowed at a young age, she turned to activism and social work.

Greig formed the Trinidad Union of Girls Clubs and organized branches throughout the island. She also worked with the Teacher's Trade Union and Trinidad Labor Party. Beginning in the late 1920s, she began contributing to the East Indian Weekly, becoming an activist speaking on behalf of Indo-Trinidadian women on issues like girls' education and child marriage. She also served as an advisor to Pandit Āyodhyā Prasād when he visited the island and established Arya Samaj in Trinidad and Tobago. In 1927, when the issue of women being able to hold positions on the Port of Spain Council was being hotly debated, Greig gave a public speech, "The Position of Women in Public Life", arguing that women were ready to serve and paid taxes. Her arguments were rejected by the Port of Spain Gazette, but two years later, women were granted the right to serve. By 1929, Greig was the associate editor of The Beacon and had a regular column in The Library. Her journalistic efforts focused on social issues, such as a 1931 piece in the Labor Leader about the involvement of religion in civil marriage and divorce. She argued that without divorce, marriage imprisoned women, allowing men to use their wives at their convenience.

In 1936, Greig became one of the first three women to run for a seat on the City Council. Though she was one of the most respected citizens and one of the most influential voices for women's rights, Greig's qualification papers were rejected. That same year, she made a presentation, "The New Age and Women's Place in It", at the Conference of British West Indies and British Guiana Women Social Workers organized by Audrey Jeffers and the Coterie of Social Workers. In the speech, she argued that women had equal mental abilities to men and that though often subordinated and suppressed, women were ready to be integrated as equal participants in society.

== Legacy ==
Greig along with Gertrude Protain and Louise Rowley of Grenada, May Farquharson and Una Marson of Jamaica, and Audrey Jeffers helped spread feminism throughout the Caribbean. She has been called one of the most important feminists of her era and her work influenced other feminists like Gema Ramkeesoon.
