= Clare Valley, Saint Vincent and the Grenadines =

Clare Valley
- Location in Saint Vincent and the Grenadines
- Coordinates: 13°10′N 061°15′W
- Country: Saint Vincent and the Grenadines
- Island: Saint Vincent
- Parish: Saint Andrew

Clare Valley is a town on the southwestern coast of Saint Vincent, in Saint Vincent and the Grenadines. It is located to the northwest of the capital, Kingstown, and southeast of Layou.
