= Troumaka =

- Location in Saint Vincent and the Grenadines
- Coordinates: 13°16′54″N 061°15′25″W
- Country: Saint Vincent and the Grenadines
- Island: Saint Vincent
- Parish: Saint David

Troumaka (Troumaca) is a village in Saint David Parish in Saint Vincent and the Grenadines. It is located in the west of the main island of Saint Vincent, between the larger towns of Barrouallie and Chateaubelair, and just to the north of the small settlement of Cumberland.
