= 2002 Davis Cup Americas Zone Group IV =

International tennis competition

The Americas Zone was one of the three zones of the regional Davis Cup competition in 2002.

In the Americas Zone there were four different tiers, called groups, in which teams competed against each other to advance to the upper tier. The six teams in Group IV played in a single Round-robin tournament . The top two teams were promoted to the Americas Zone Group III in 2003. All other teams remained in Group IV.

== Draw ==
- Venue: National Tennis Centre, Calliaqua, Saint Vincent (outdoor hard)
- Date: 1–6 April

Team	Pld	W	L	MF	MA
Bolivia	5	5	0	13	2
Saint Lucia	5	4	1	12	3
Bermuda	5	3	2	8	7
Barbados	5	2	3	7	8
Eastern Caribbean	5	1	4	4	11
U.S. Virgin Islands	5	0	5	1	14

- Bolivia and Saint Lucia promoted to Group III for 2003.

== Results ==
=== U.S. Virgin Islands vs. Bermuda ===
U.S. Virgin Islands
1
National Tennis Centre, Saint Vincent and the Grenadines
1 April 2002

Bermuda
2

			1	2	3
1	(United States Virgin Islands) (Bermuda)	John Richards; Jenson Bascome	4; 6	2; 6
2	(United States Virgin Islands) (Bermuda)	Terrance Eugene Highfield; James Collieson	6; 2	6; 1
3	(United States Virgin Islands) (Bermuda)	Terrance Eugene Highfield / John Richards; Jenson Bascome / James Collieson	4; 6	6; 3	3; 6

=== Barbados vs. Saint Lucia ===
Barbados
0
National Tennis Centre, Saint Vincent and the Grenadines
1 April 2002

Saint Lucia
3

			1	2	3
1	(Barbados) (Saint Lucia)	Jonathan Lewis; Vernon Lewis	1; 6	2; 6
2	(Barbados) (Saint Lucia)	James Betts; Kane Easter	0; 6	1; 6
3	(Barbados) (Saint Lucia)	Damien Applewhaite / Haydn Lewis; Sirsean Arlain / Yves Sinson	5; 7	6^{2} 7^{7}

=== Bolivia vs. Eastern Caribbean ===
Bolivia
3
National Tennis Centre, Saint Vincent and the Grenadines
1 April 2002

Eastern Caribbean
0

			1	2	3
1	(Bolivia) (Eastern Caribbean)	Alberto Sottocorno; Dexter Christian	6; 3	6; 3
2	(Bolivia) (Eastern Caribbean)	Javier Taborga; Glynn James	6; 1	7; 5
3	(Bolivia) (Eastern Caribbean)	Alberto Sottocorno / Gonzalo Ulloa; Hayden Ashton / Glynn James	3; 6	7; 5	8; 6

=== U.S. Virgin Islands vs. Barbados ===
U.S. Virgin Islands
0
National Tennis Centre, Saint Vincent and the Grenadines
2 April 2002

Barbados
3

			1	2	3
1	(United States Virgin Islands) (Barbados)	John Richards; Jonathan Lewis	0; 6	0; 6
2	(United States Virgin Islands) (Barbados)	Terrance Eugene Highfield; James Betts	3; 6	4; 6
3	(United States Virgin Islands) (Barbados)	John Richards / Bruce Wray; Damien Applewhaite / Haydn Lewis	5; 7	2; 6

=== Bermuda vs. Eastern Caribbean ===
Bermuda
2
National Tennis Centre, Saint Vincent and the Grenadines
2 April 2002

Eastern Caribbean
1

			1	2	3
1	(Bermuda) (Eastern Caribbean)	Jenson Bascome; Dexter Christian	2; 6	6; 3	6; 3
2	(Bermuda) (Eastern Caribbean)	James Collieson; Glynn James	6; 3	0; 6	1; 6
3	(Bermuda) (Eastern Caribbean)	Jenson Bascome / James Collieson; Hayden Ashton / Glynn James	7^{7} 6^{4}	6; 1

=== Bolivia vs. Saint Lucia ===
Bolivia
2
National Tennis Centre, Saint Vincent and the Grenadines
2 April 2002

Saint Lucia
1

			1	2	3
1	(Bolivia) (Saint Lucia)	Alberto Sottocorno; Vernon Lewis	5; 7	3; 6
2	(Bolivia) (Saint Lucia)	Javier Taborga; Kane Easter	6; 3	6; 4
3	(Bolivia) (Saint Lucia)	Alberto Sottocorno / Javier Taborga; Kane Easter / Yves Sinson	6; 4	7^{7} 6^{4}

=== U.S. Virgin Islands vs. Eastern Caribbean ===
U.S. Virgin Islands
0
National Tennis Centre, Saint Vincent and the Grenadines
3 April 2002

Eastern Caribbean
3

			1	2	3
1	(United States Virgin Islands) (Eastern Caribbean)	John Richards; Dexter Christian	2; 6	3; 6
2	(United States Virgin Islands) (Eastern Caribbean)	Terrance Eugene Highfield; Glynn James	4; 3			retired
3	(United States Virgin Islands) (Eastern Caribbean)	John Richards / Bruce Wray; Hayden Ashton / Deron Grant	2; 6	3; 6

=== Barbados vs. Bolivia ===
Barbados
0
National Tennis Centre, Saint Vincent and the Grenadines
3 April 2002

Bolivia
3

			1	2	3
1	(Barbados) (Bolivia)	Jonathan Lewis; Alberto Sottocorno	6^{6} 7^{8}	3; 6
2	(Barbados) (Bolivia)	James Betts; Javier Taborga	2; 6	2; 6
3	(Barbados) (Bolivia)	Damien Applewhaite / Haydn Lewis; Alberto Sottocorno / Javier Taborga	3; 6	0; 6

=== Bermuda vs. Saint Lucia ===
Bermuda
1
National Tennis Centre, Saint Vincent and the Grenadines
3 April 2002

Saint Lucia
2

			1	2	3
1	(Bermuda) (Saint Lucia)	Jenson Bascome; Vernon Lewis	4; 6	2; 6
2	(Bermuda) (Saint Lucia)	James Collieson; Kane Easter	6; 4	3; 6	6; 2
3	(Bermuda) (Saint Lucia)	Jenson Bascome / James Collieson; Vernon Lewis / Yves Sinson	5; 7	3; 6

=== U.S. Virgin Islands vs. Bolivia ===
U.S. Virgin Islands
0
National Tennis Centre, Saint Vincent and the Grenadines
5 April 2002

Bolivia
3

			1	2	3
1	(United States Virgin Islands) (Bolivia)	John Richards; Gonzalo Ulloa	1; 6	1; 6
2	(United States Virgin Islands) (Bolivia)	Terrance Eugene Highfield; Javier Taborga	7; 5	1; 6	1; 6
3	(United States Virgin Islands) (Bolivia)	John Richards / Bruce Wray; Alberto Sottocorno / Javier Taborga	2; 6	0; 6

=== Barbados vs. Bermuda ===
Barbados
1
National Tennis Centre, Saint Vincent and the Grenadines
5 April 2002

Bermuda
2

			1	2	3
1	(Barbados) (Bermuda)	Jonathan Lewis; Jenson Bascome	6^{7} 7^{9}	7; 5	2; 6
2	(Barbados) (Bermuda)	Damien Applewhaite; James Collieson	3; 6	2; 6
3	(Barbados) (Bermuda)	Damien Applewhaite / Haydn Lewis; Jenson Bascome / James Collieson	5; 7	7^{8} 6^{6}	6; 4

=== Eastern Caribbean vs. Saint Lucia ===
Eastern Caribbean
0
National Tennis Centre, Saint Vincent and the Grenadines
5 April 2002

Saint Lucia
3

			1	2	3
1	(Eastern Caribbean) (Saint Lucia)	Deron Grant; Sirsean Arlain	6; 4	5; 7	5; 7
2	(Eastern Caribbean) (Saint Lucia)	Glynn James; Vernon Lewis	2; 6	0; 6
3	(Eastern Caribbean) (Saint Lucia)	Hayden Ashton / Glynn James; Sirsean Arlain / Yves Sinson	6; 3	3; 6	2; 6

=== U.S. Virgin Islands vs. Saint Lucia ===
U.S. Virgin Islands
0
National Tennis Centre, Saint Vincent and the Grenadines
6 April 2002

Saint Lucia
3

			1	2	3
1	(United States Virgin Islands) (Saint Lucia)	John Richards; Yves Sinson	2; 6	6; 4	2; 6
2	(United States Virgin Islands) (Saint Lucia)	Terrance Eugene Highfield; Vernon Lewis	2; 6	1; 6
3	(United States Virgin Islands) (Saint Lucia)	Terrance Eugene Highfield / John Richards; Vernon Lewis / Yves Sinson	4; 6	1; 6

=== Barbados vs. Eastern Caribbean ===
Barbados
3
National Tennis Centre, Saint Vincent and the Grenadines
6 April 2002

Eastern Caribbean
0

			1	2	3
1	(Barbados) (Eastern Caribbean)	Haydn Lewis; Dexter Christian	6; 1	6; 3
2	(Barbados) (Eastern Caribbean)	Damien Applewhaite; Glynn James	6; 2	4; 6	8; 6
3	(Barbados) (Eastern Caribbean)	James Betts / Jonathan Lewis; Hayden Ashton / Deron Grant	6; 1	5; 7	6; 1

=== Bermuda vs. Bolivia ===
Bermuda
1
National Tennis Centre, Saint Vincent and the Grenadines
6 April 2002

Bolivia
2

			1	2	3
1	(Bermuda) (Bolivia)	Jenson Bascome; Gonzalo Ulloa	5; 7	6; 1	6; 1
2	(Bermuda) (Bolivia)	James Collieson; Alberto Sottocorno	4; 6	6; 4	0; 6
3	(Bermuda) (Bolivia)	Ryan Swan / Jovan Whitter; Alberto Sottocorno / Gonzalo Ulloa	3; 6	3; 6
