= Belmont, Saint Vincent and the Grenadines =

Belmont
- Location in Saint Vincent and the Grenadines
- Coordinates: 13°09′49″N 061°10′48″W
- Country: Saint Vincent and the Grenadines
- Island: Saint Vincent
- Parish: Saint George

Belmont is a village in southern inland Saint Vincent, in Saint Vincent and the Grenadines. It is located to the east of the capital, Kingstown and northwest of Stubbs.
