= Diamond Village, Saint Vincent and the Grenadines =

Diamond Village
- Location in Saint Vincent and the Grenadines
- Coordinates: 13.23°N 61.13°W
- Country: Saint Vincent and the Grenadines
- Island: Saint Vincent
- Parish: Charlotte

Diamond is a small farming village on the windward (East or Atlantic) side of St. Vincent, the main island of the archipelago nation of Saint Vincent and the Grenadines.

Diamond Village, often referred to as simply "Diamonds," is located in the Parish of Charlotte and is part of the South Central Windward Parliamentary Constituency. Located approximately 18 miles north-east of Kingstown, the capital of St. Vincent and the Grenadines, it actually takes about an hour to drive to or from Kingstown along the winding Windward Highway. Diamond Village proper has a population of approximately 500, although when grouped with small surrounding villages such as New Adelphi and Stinking Tree, the population increases to about 900. There is a primary school in the village, Diamond Government School, a district clinic, a post office, a small community center, two churches, and about 8 small shops. The majority of Diamond Village inhabitants are engaged in agriculture, specifically banana farming. However, as the profitability of bananas declines and the level of education increases, more young people are employed in the civil service in Kingstown.

Recently, Diamonites, the active youth group in the village, produced a documentary recounting the village's history through the oral histories of village elders. The documentary is entitled Connecting Generations: A History of Diamond Village.

== Notes ==
Coordinates are estimated from a map provided by the St Vincent and the Grenadines Ministry of Tourism and Culture.
