= Bequia =

Island in the Grenadines

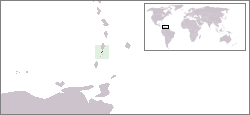

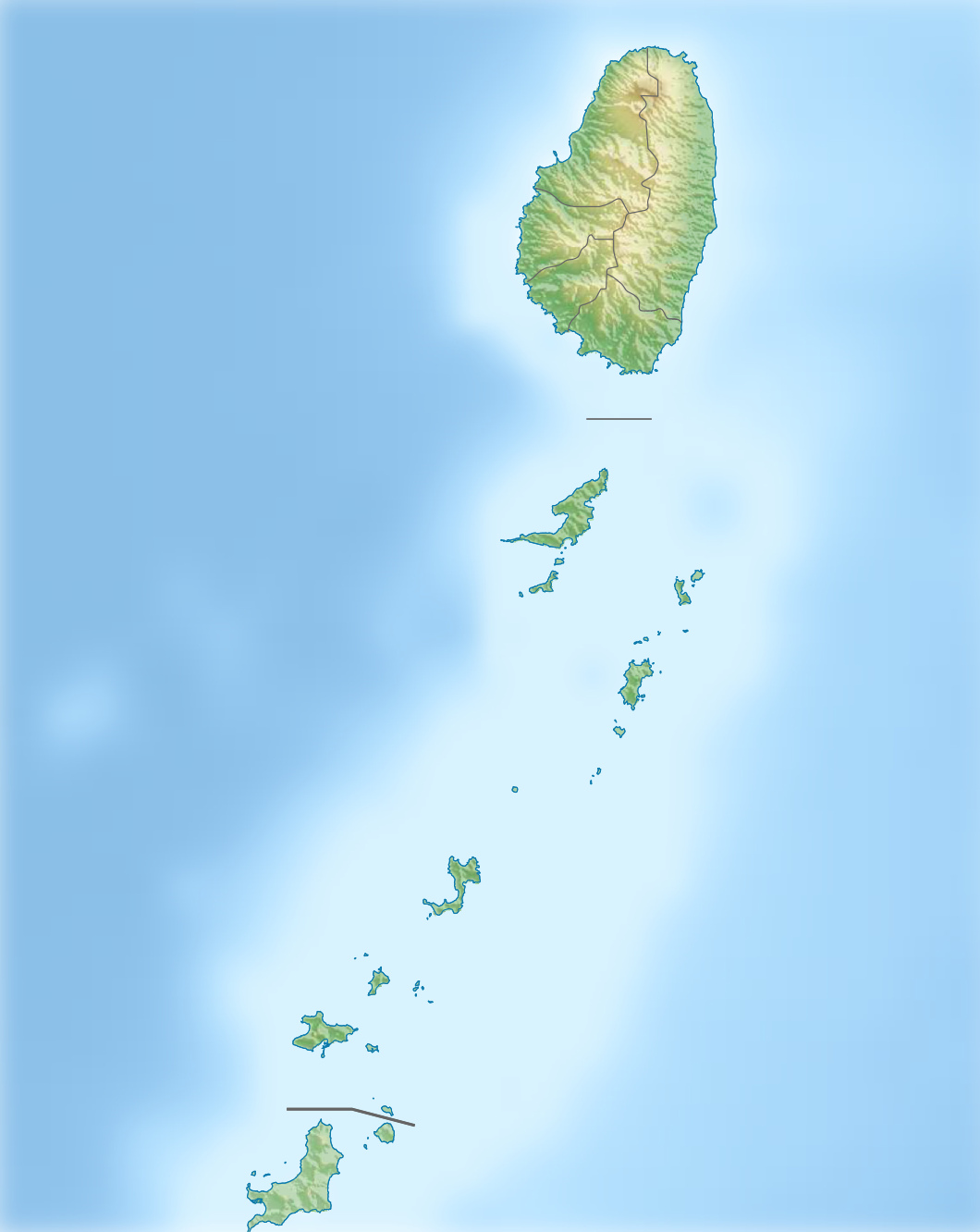
- Location within Saint Vincent and the Grenadines Location within Lesser Antilles Location within the Caribbean

Geography
- Location: Caribbean
- Coordinates: 13°00′54″N 61°13′48″W
- Area: 7 sq mi (18 km^{2})

Administration
- Saint Vincent and the Grenadines

Demographics
- Population: about 5,300
- Ethnic groups: African, Scottish and Carib

Additional information
Bequia Marine Conservation Area
- IUCN category VI (protected area with sustainable use of natural resources)
- Interactive map of Bequia Marine Conservation Area
- Area: 367.5 km^{2} (141.9 sq mi)
- Established: 1987
- Website: Bequia Marine in Saint Vincent and the Grenadines

Bequia (/ˈbɛkwiː/ BEK-wee or /ˈbɛkweɪ/ BEK-way) is the second-largest island in the Grenadines at 7 square miles (18 km^{2}). It is part of the country of Saint Vincent and the Grenadines and lies approximately 15 kilometres (9.3 mi) from the nation's capital, Kingstown, on the main island, Saint Vincent.

The name Bequia is said to derive from the Carib word becouya, meaning "island of the clouds". The island's early inhabitants were the Kalinago (Caribs), who lived throughout the Grenadines before the arrival of Europeans.

In the eighteenth century, Bequia was colonised by European powers, first claimed and settled by the French, who established small plantations producing indigo, cotton, and sugar worked by enslaved Africans. Following the Treaty of Paris (1763), France ceded Bequia and the neighbouring islands to Britain, which continued the plantation system and maintained colonial rule until independence in 1979 as part of Saint Vincent and the Grenadines.

Bequia also has a history of whaling, introduced by Yankee whalers in the nineteenth century. Its people are allowed to catch up to four humpback whales per year using traditional hunting methods. The limit is rarely met, with no catches at all in some years.

== Geography ==
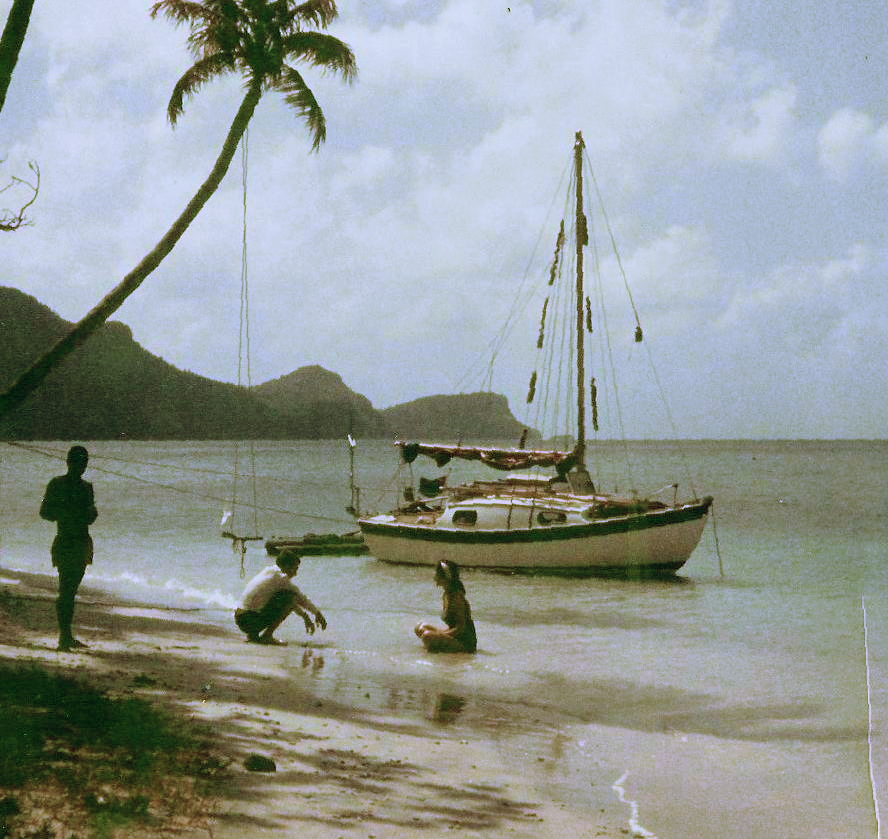
Admiralty Bay, Bequia, in 1966

Bequia is a small island, measuring 7 square miles (18 km^{2}) with a population of approximately 5,300. The native population are primarily a mixture of people of African, Scottish and Kalinago descent. A substantial number of white Barbadians also settled the Mount Pleasant area of Bequia in the 1860s. Many of their descendants still inhabit the area. Other highly populated areas include the island capital, Port Elizabeth, which hosts the ferry terminal, and Paget Farm, which hosts the airport. There are also villages at Lower Bay, La Pompe, Hamilton and Belmont. Other prominent areas of Bequia include Spring, the site of a former coconut plantation and home to agricultural animals, Industry Bay and Park Bay.

The island's hills are much lower than the peaks of St. Vincent, 10 miles (16 km) to the north, so they do not receive as many rain showers.

Princess Margaret, who had a home on nearby Mustique, visited Bequia in the 1950s and had a beach renamed in her honour. Princess Margaret Beach is next to Port Elizabeth and is situated inside Admiralty Bay on the west coast. The beach was originally known as Tony Gibbons, and continues to be known by that name locally, though the origin of this name is uncertain. Also on the west coast are the island's main port and a large natural harbour.

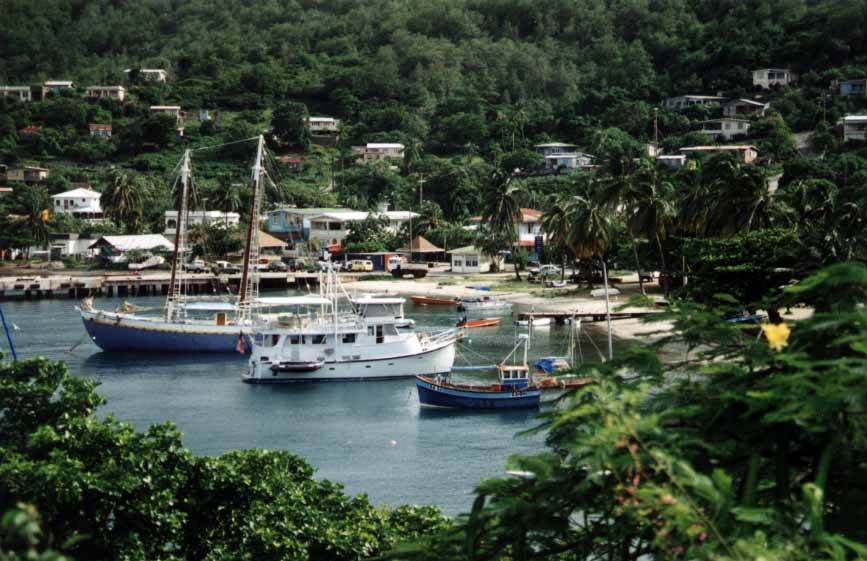
Port Elizabeth, Bequia, in 2005

== Tourism ==
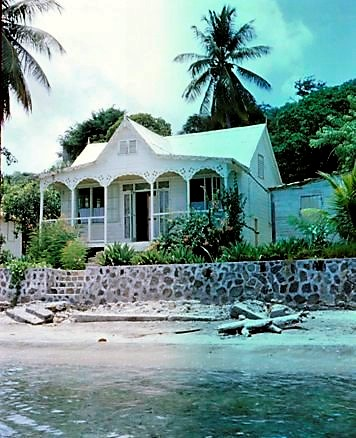
Gingerbread House, Bequia, in 1967

Bequia is popular among cruising yachts, expatriates and tourists. One of the busiest times of the year is the annual Easter Regatta and Music Fest.

Two scuba diving stores run dive trips to 28 identified dive sites around Bequia. There are several wrecks and shallow caves accessible to advanced divers. It is not unusual to see hawksbill turtles, lobsters, moray eels and many kinds of fish when diving around Bequia.

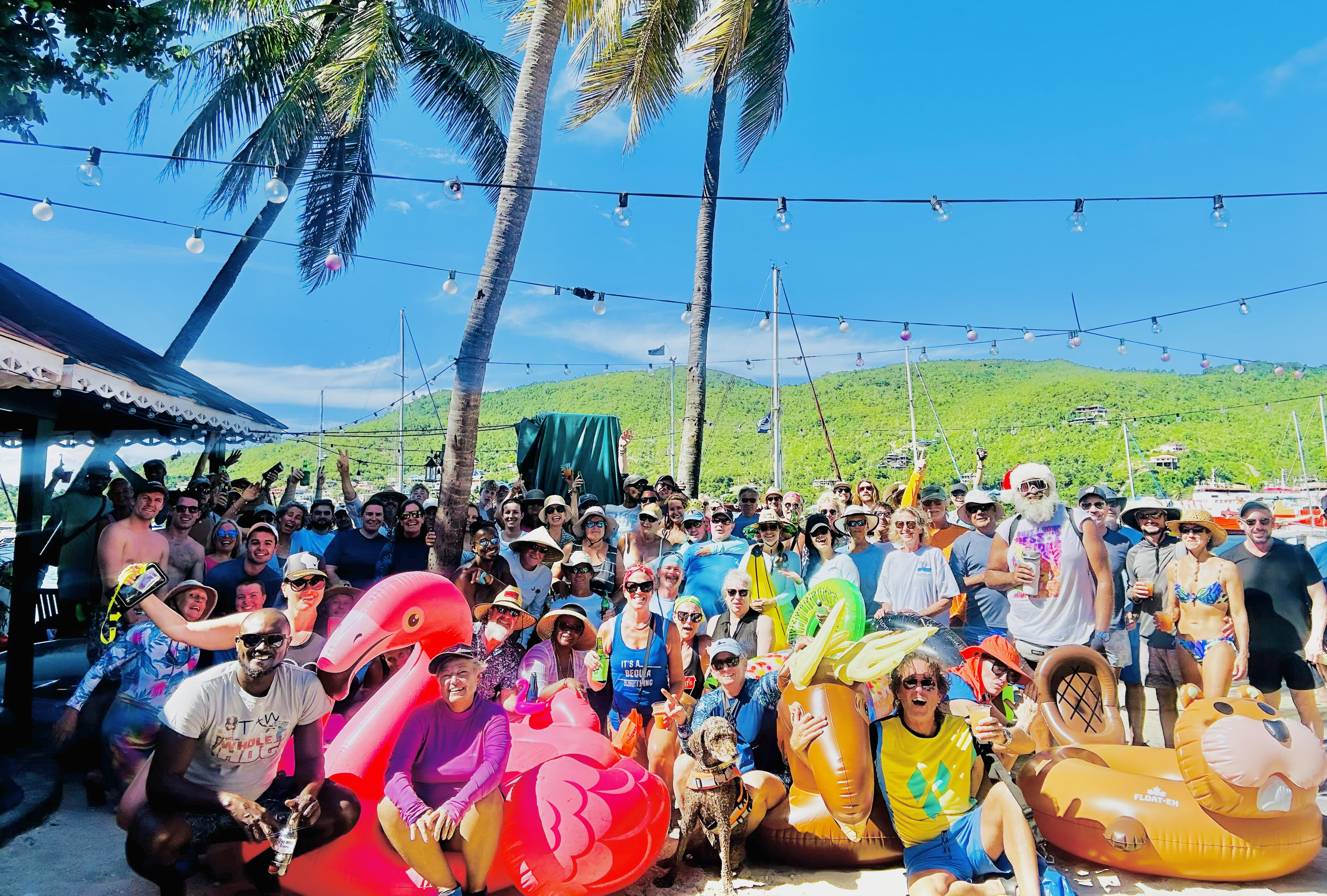
Record-setting attendance at 2025's New Year's Day Lilo Regatta

A tradition growing in popularity among locals and tourists is Bequia's New Year's Day Lilo Regatta. Held since 2010 as a way to recover from Old Year's Night festivities, it draws nearly 100 participants, who gather at the Frangipani and Whaleboner bars in the early afternoon for a trip across the bays on any unmotorised device that floats.

== History ==
Map of Bequia c. 1769

Runaway and shipwrecked enslaved Africans settled on the island of St. Vincent in the 17th century. According to early accounts of the French West Indies, which at the time considered Bequia part of Grenada, the island was regarded as too inaccessible for permanent colonisation. The Kalinago and Arawak peoples used it primarily for fishing and farming. A few Portuguese and Dutch ships transporting enslaved Africans from West Africa to Sint Eustatius were reportedly wrecked on the Grenadine reefs. Following the Treaty of Utrecht (1713–1715), which ended the War of the Spanish Succession and established peace between the Spanish and British empires, Great Britain secured the monopoly over the asiento slave trade.

In the decades that followed, Bequia and the wider Grenadines became sites of increasing European interest and conflict. French settlers established small plantations cultivating indigo, cotton, and sugar, worked by enslaved Africans brought through the Atlantic slave trade. The island's Indigenous Kalinago population was gradually displaced or assimilated during this period, a pattern common across the Lesser Antilles as European powers expanded their control. Although the terrain and limited freshwater discouraged large-scale settlement, Bequia's protected harbours and position along inter-island trade routes made it a useful stopover for colonial shipping and privateers.

Bequia was under French control in the 18th century. During the Seven Years' War against Great Britain, the island was used by the fleets of France's Spanish allies to take on supplies, while British ships were banned. The 1763 Treaty of Paris produced a significant re-alignment in the map of the Caribbean; St. Vincent and the Grenadine islands, including Grenada, were given to the British in exchange for Guadeloupe, Martinique and St. Lucia. The name Petit Martinique comes from this era, as does Petit Saint Vincent. In 1779, the French seized the island, despite the treaty, but were forced to relinquish control to Britain again soon after.

The early 18th century saw the development of a sugar industry and the production of related products including molasses and rum. Other major produce included coffee, indigo and arrowroot. At one point in time, the islands of St. Vincent and the Grenadines were the single largest producer of arrowroot starch in the world. Currently, Hairoun and Vincy strong rum are major export products primarily to the European Union.

Under a programme instituted by Great Britain to give land to indigent settlers, James Hamilton, father of Alexander Hamilton, moved from St. Croix to Bequia in 1774 where he remained until 1790. The land granted to Hamilton lies along the shore of Southeast Bay. Despite his son's frequent gifts of money and entreaties to immigrate or at least visit him, neither visited the other.

Some historians believe that the famous pirate Edward "Blackbeard" Teach had his base in Bequia. The opening shot of the movie Blackbeard, Pirate of the Caribbean, made by the BBC, displays a replica of his first ship off the coast of Bequia in the St. Vincent passage. According to local legend, Saint Vincent and the Grenadines was not only Teach's base, but also the place from which Sir Francis Drake planned his attacks on the Spanish admiralty in Don Blas de Lezo's Cartagena. Indeed, it is thought that Henry Morgan may also have anchored in Admiralty Bay, as it was then the safest natural harbour in the Eastern Caribbean during hurricane season. Bequia was used as a repair facility for ships. Beside Nelson's Dockyard on Antigua, and the Carlyle in Bridgetown, Barbados, there were no other drydocks or shipyards in the area. Wooden shipbuilding and ship-repair on Bequia was possible due to the presence of cedar trees on the island and a sufficiently deep and sheltered harbour.

== Whaling ==
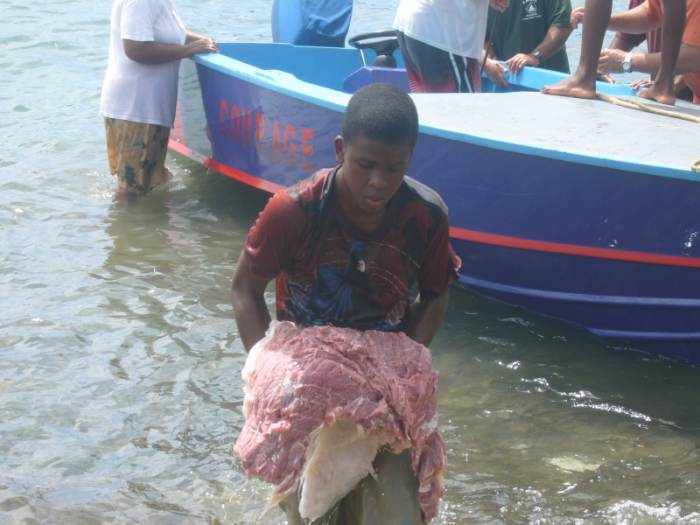
Boy carrying whale meat

Bequia is one of the few places in the world where limited whaling is still allowed. The International Whaling Commission (IWC) classifies the island's hunt under the regulations concerning aboriginal whaling. Natives of Bequia are allowed to catch up to four humpback whales per year using traditional hunting methods of hand-thrown harpoons in small, open sailboats. In practice, fishermen in speedboats also help to kill the whale with a darting gun, and boats with outboard motors help to tow it. The limit is rarely met, with no catch some years. Bequians took up whaling in the late 19th century, and the practice continues as of 2025.

At the 2012 meeting of the IWC, the Whaling Commissioners renewed the annual quota of whales for all three groups who submitted joint bids: Alaskan Inupiat, Russian indigenous people in Chukotka in eastern Siberia, and St Vincent and the Grenadines, despite protestations of the delegations from the Dominican Republic, Ecuador, Chile, and Costa Rica. Dominican Republic delegate Peter Sanchez said the St Vincent and the Grenadines hunt was "artisanal whaling out of control", and that the hunters have "repeatedly broken the rules—hunting for young whales and pregnant females". Other delegates argued that St. Vincent and the Grenadines' bid "should not qualify under ASW [Aboriginal Subsistence Whaling] rules because the Bequians, the group that maintains the hunt, are not truly indigenous". The Whaling Commissioner for Monaco, Frederic Briand, argued that whaling "started by a settler's family as recently as 1875 does not qualify as 'aboriginal'". Louise Mitchell, speaking on behalf of the Eastern Caribbean Coalition of Environmental Awareness stated that there was no documented history of whaling in the islands, and that "there have been many archaeological excavations conducted, and there was no evidence found whatsoever of whale hunting by aboriginal peoples. Neither whale remains nor weapons that could have been used to kill such a large mammals were ever found; neither are any images of whales inscribed on our petroglyphs."

There is a small whaling museum on the island chronicling local whaling's history. A feature of the Port Elizabeth waterfront is the Whaleboner Bar & Restaurant. This bar has an entrance onto the beach consisting of an arch of two whale ribs, as well as whale vertebrae mounted on the bar seats and a whale rib running the length of the bar.

== Transportation ==
=== Air ===
Constructed in 1992, the James F. Mitchell International Airport for small planes is located near Paget Farm. It has a runway 3,609 feet (1,100 metres) long, and Bequia can be reached by plane with daily connections from Kingstown, Bridgetown (Barbados) and surrounding islands.

=== Sea ===
Regularly scheduled ferries run from the main island of Saint Vincent. Three ferries operate between the capital, Kingstown, and the local port of Port Elizabeth. The other islands in the Grenadines can be reached by the Bequia-built schooner Friendship Rose, as well as other charter/tour boats that are widely available and based in Port Elizabeth. The Friendship Rose offers daytime as well as overnight charters, and onboard picnics are locally renowned. This has resulted in significant increases in mostly domestic tourism.

The ferry pier in Kingstown is located 45 minutes' drive from Argyle International Airport and is served by two companies, Bequia Express and Admiralty Transport. Bequia Express uses a family-owned ferry that is 148 feet (45 m) long with a cargo space measuring 4,440 square feet (412 m^{2}) of which 3,000 square feet (280 m^{2}) is sheltered with a 14-foot (4.3 m) ceiling. The approximate capacity of the ship is 28 cars or 10 to 20 containers and is licensed for 400 passengers. The Admiral II is a similarly sized vessel with a capacity for 250 passengers. Travellers on the Admiral II have a choice between air-conditioned indoor seating and covered outdoor seating. The passage between Kingstown and Port Elizabeth is a 9-mile (14 km) trip taking approximately one hour.

Pedestrians such as hitchhikers and backpackers have the option of the Grenadines mail boat which travels to Port Elizabeth at irregular intervals. The mail boat calls at Canouan, Mayreau and Union Island, although boarding at Mayreau can be difficult, as the vessel remains in deeper waters, with passengers being required to embark and leave through the use of smaller craft, which land on the nearby beach.

== Communications ==
The island has a variety of communication systems including standard telephone and fax lines, a mobile network, and internet access. The old telex system still operates. Bequia has its own heavy-duty, long-range shortwave radio antenna. Many inhabitants use the marine VHF radio system on channel 68 for local communication.

== Notable people ==
Despite its small population, Bequia has produced several notable politicians.

- Sydney Gun-Munro, first Governor-General of Saint Vincent and the Grenadines.
- James Fitz-Allen Mitchell (1931–2021), Vincentian politician who served as the second Prime Minister of Saint Vincent and the Grenadines from 1984 to 2000 and as the second Premier of Saint Vincent from 1972 to 1974.
- Sarah Louise Mitchell (born 1970), Attorney General of Saint Vincent and the Grenadines since 2025 and daughter of former Prime Minister James Mitchell.

== See also ==
- Moonhole – a private community on Bequia
