= St. Vincent Girls' High School =

Coordinates: 13°09′22.4″N 61°13′21.0″W

St Vincent Girls' High School
- Crest of St Vincent Girls' High School

Location
- Murray Road, Kingstown; Saint Vincent and the Grenadines

Information
- Type: Public Secondary School
- Motto: Latin: Per Ardua Ad Alta (Through Difficulty to Heights)
- Established: May 8, 1911; 114 years ago
- Headmistress: C. Latoya Deroche-John
- Staff: 58
- Gender: Female
- Age range: 10 - 18
- Enrollment: 692
- Language: English
- Hours in school day: 8
- Classrooms: 25
- Colours: Blue and White
- Website: svghs.com

St. Vincent Girls' High School is a secondary education facility opened in Kingstown on the island of St. Vincent in Saint Vincent and the Grenadines. The school was founded by Mary L. Ince in 1911 at the corner of Linley and Tyrell Street in Kingstown. In 1914, the government took over operation of the school and made Ince the headmistress. The following year, students began participating for the first time in the Cambridge Examinations. By 1918, the school had a staff of 3 teachers and 16 students and functioned as a secondary school for middle-class pupils, who were able to afford the £6 per year fee, as elites could afford to send their children to Barbados or Britain for higher education. In 1935, the school relocated to its present location on Murray Road in Kingstown to a site known as the Judges Lodge. The school's students consistently rank highly in the Caribbean Secondary Education Certificate examinations, with pass rates over 95%. In every year since 2000, the school has had the highest rate of students passing the examination in the country.

The original school colors were green and brown and the students wore uniforms consisting of a long-sleeved sailor-collared shirt with a brown and green tie. Heads were covered with a wide brimmed Panama hat which had a green hatband. In 1934, the required dress was changed to the present uniform, a white shirt over a navy skirt worn with a blue and silver tie. The curricula includes English and French language studies, geography, mathematics and physical education, with a variety of humanities and technical skills courses, and study in both the social and natural sciences. There are active alumni organizations in New York State in the U.S. and Toronto, Canada, which regularly host events and make donations to their alma mater.
