= Byera Hill =

- Location in Saint Vincent and the Grenadines
- Coordinates: 13.25912°N 61.11802°W
- Country: Saint Vincent and the Grenadines
- Island: Saint Vincent
- Parish: Charlotte

Byera Hill is a town on the east coast of Saint Vincent, in Saint Vincent and the Grenadines. It is located to the south of Georgetown, on the coast road linking it with the capital Kingstown.
