= Gertie Wood =

Guyanese social worker and activist (1892–1976)

- Born: September 18, 1892
- Died: August 26, 1976 (aged 83)
- Awards: Order of the British Empire; King George V Silver Jubilee Medal

Gertie Lucina Wood OBE (September 18, 1892 – August 26, 1976) was a Guyanese social worker and women's rights activist. She was the first woman to run for political office in the British West Indies.

Gertie Wood was born on September 18, 1892 of Barbadian parents, businessman George Walter Wood and Catherine Louisa Briggs Wood.

In 1931, Wood founded the Circle of Sunshine Workers in 1931 with the motto "Feed my lambs, feed my sheep." The Sunshine Workers provided thousands of free meals for children and later provided education for working class women. Wood attended the Coterie of Social Workers' 1936 First Inter-Colonial Conference of Women Social Workers in Trinidad and Tobago and organized the 1938 Second Inter-Colonial Conference of Women Social Workers in British Guiana. In 1939, she testified before the Royal West Indian Commission regarding economic conditions and the lack of social services. She founded British Guiana’s League of Social Services and with Audrey Jeffries co-founded the West Indies and British Guiana Women Social Workers Association.

In 1933, following the resignation of Alfred Crane, she ran in a snap election for his vacant seat on the Georgetown City Council. Though she lost to J. L. Wills, she received positive press coverage.

In the late 1940s she emigrated to the United States following the death of her parents and only sibling. She settled in Harlem, where she befriended James Baldwin and worked as a cleaning woman and music teacher. She refused to become an American citizen due to rampant anti-black racism in the US.

== Awards and legacy ==
She was awarded the King George V Silver Jubilee Medal and the Order of the British Empire in 1936 for her work with children. In 2019, she was one of the first group of 25 women inducted into the Women's Hall of Fame by the Guyana Women and Gender Equality Commission (WGEC).
