= Moonhole =

Grenadine private community

Coordinates: 12.9917°N 61.2761°W

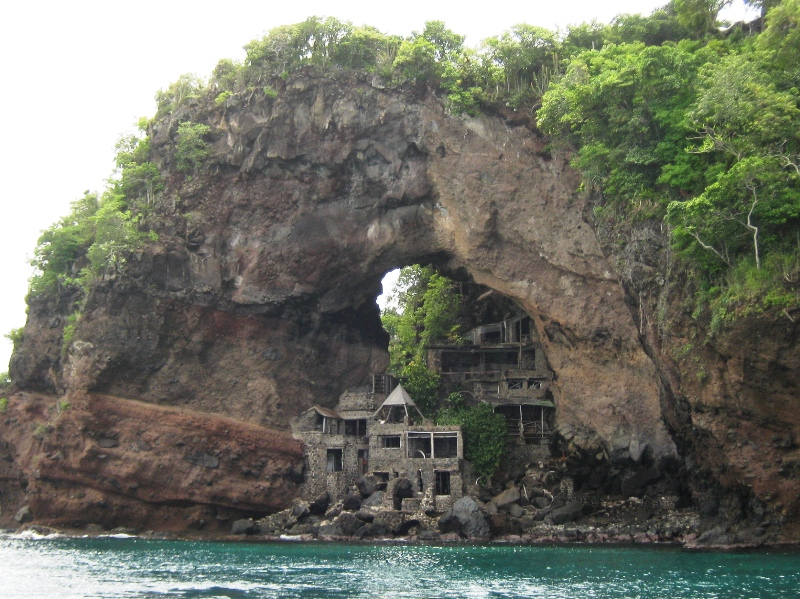
Moonhole

Moonhole is a private community on the island of Bequia (Bek-way) in the Grenadines. Its name is derived from a massive arch formed in volcanic substrate, through which the setting moon is sometimes visible. Founded by Thomas and Gladys Johnston in the 1960s, Moonhole is now a private nature preserve.

The Johnstons retired from an advertising business in New York in the late 1960s, and founded the Moonhole community on the narrow western tip of the island. They began building a house beneath the arch with the aid of local masons from the nearby village of Paget Farm. Using whalebones, native hardwoods, and objects recovered from the sea, they built large open rooms with sea views. Without wells or electricity, they collected rainwater from the roofs and stored it in cisterns for bathing and washing. The master bath had a large tree that grew up through a large hole in the roof. Large windows facing the prevailing trade winds had plexiglass panes that could be lowered into place. The bedrooms surrounded a central dining room, veranda and large bar made from a humpback whale's jaw bone. In the early years there was no road to Moonhole, and people from Paget Farm walked there daily to take them fruit and freshly baked bread and to cook.

The Johnstons formed Moonhole Company Limited, and donated the approximately 30-acre (12 ha) property to the company. Tom bequeathed his controlling interest in Moonhole Company Limited to a trust for the protection and preservation of Moonhole for posterity. The Thomas and Gladys Johnston Moonhole Conservation Trust Limited is dedicated to preserving the unique architecture, lifestyle, and vision of the Johnstons and to protecting the birds, wildlife and marine life on the peninsula at the western end of Bequia. There are now eleven privately owned homes at Moonhole. and four houses owned by Moonhole Company Limited. Some of these properties are available for rent throughout the year.

In 2004 The New York Times described Moonhole as "a quirky 19-home ecologically oriented development built of native stone, with whalebone accents, on the steep hills of the island's southern tip. The name comes from a soaring natural arch on the shore through which the moon can be seen at times. The whalebones, remnants of aboriginal whaling by the islanders, are big enough to work as elements like stair railings. The houses, which rely on solar electricity, rainwater and propane tanks, are mostly fanciful open-air affairs with lines blurred between indoors and out."
