= Charlestown, Saint Vincent and the Grenadines =

Charlestown
- Town
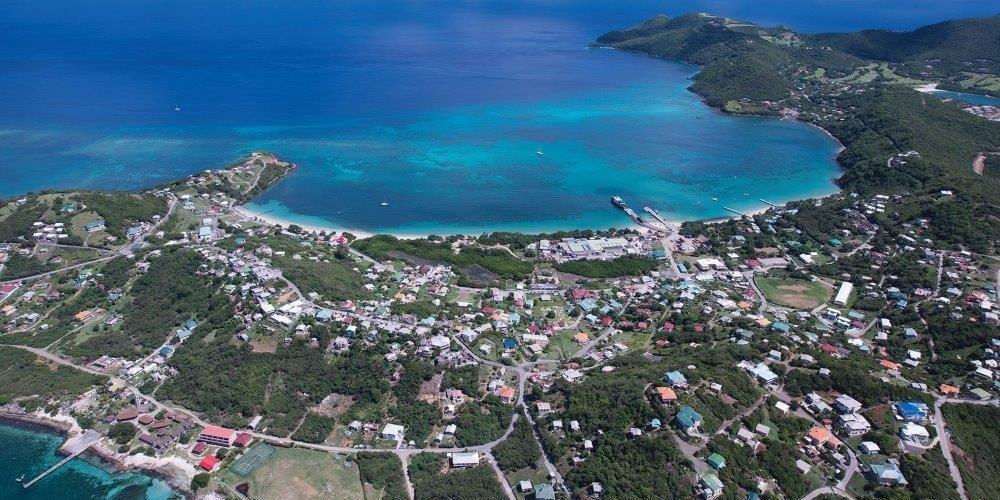
- The town of Charlestown

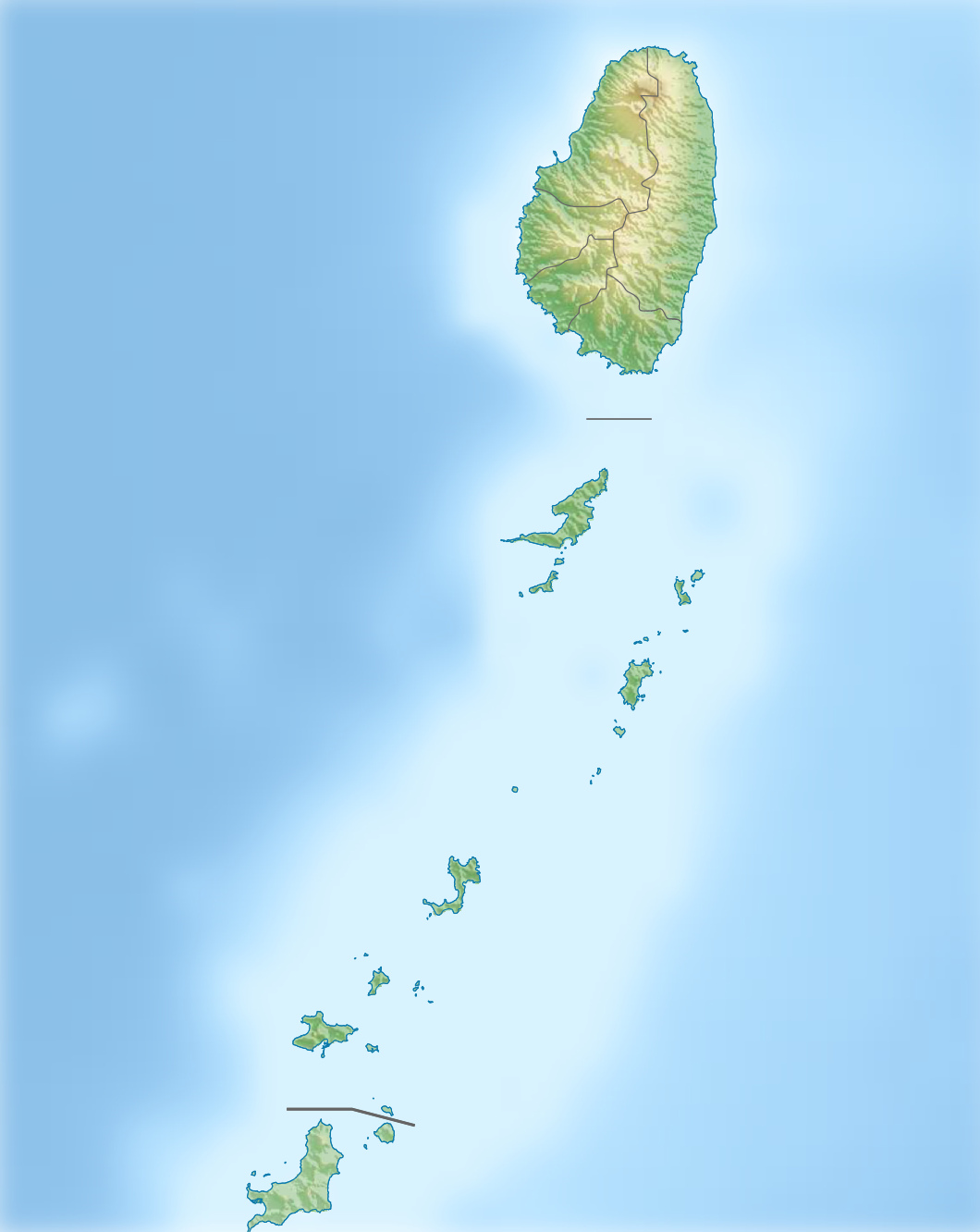
- Location in Saint Vincent and the Grenadines
- Coordinates: 12°42′03″N 61°19′53″W
- Country: Saint Vincent and the Grenadines
- Island: Canouan
- Parish: Grenadines
- Elevation: 23 m (76 ft)

Population (2012)
  - Total: 513
- Time zone: UTC-04:00 (AST)

Charlestown is a town located on the island of Canouan, which is part of the Grenadines island chain. It is the largest town on the island and had a population of 513 in 2012.

== See also ==
- Saint Vincent and the Grenadines
