= Port Elizabeth, Saint Vincent and the Grenadines =

Port Elizabeth
- Town
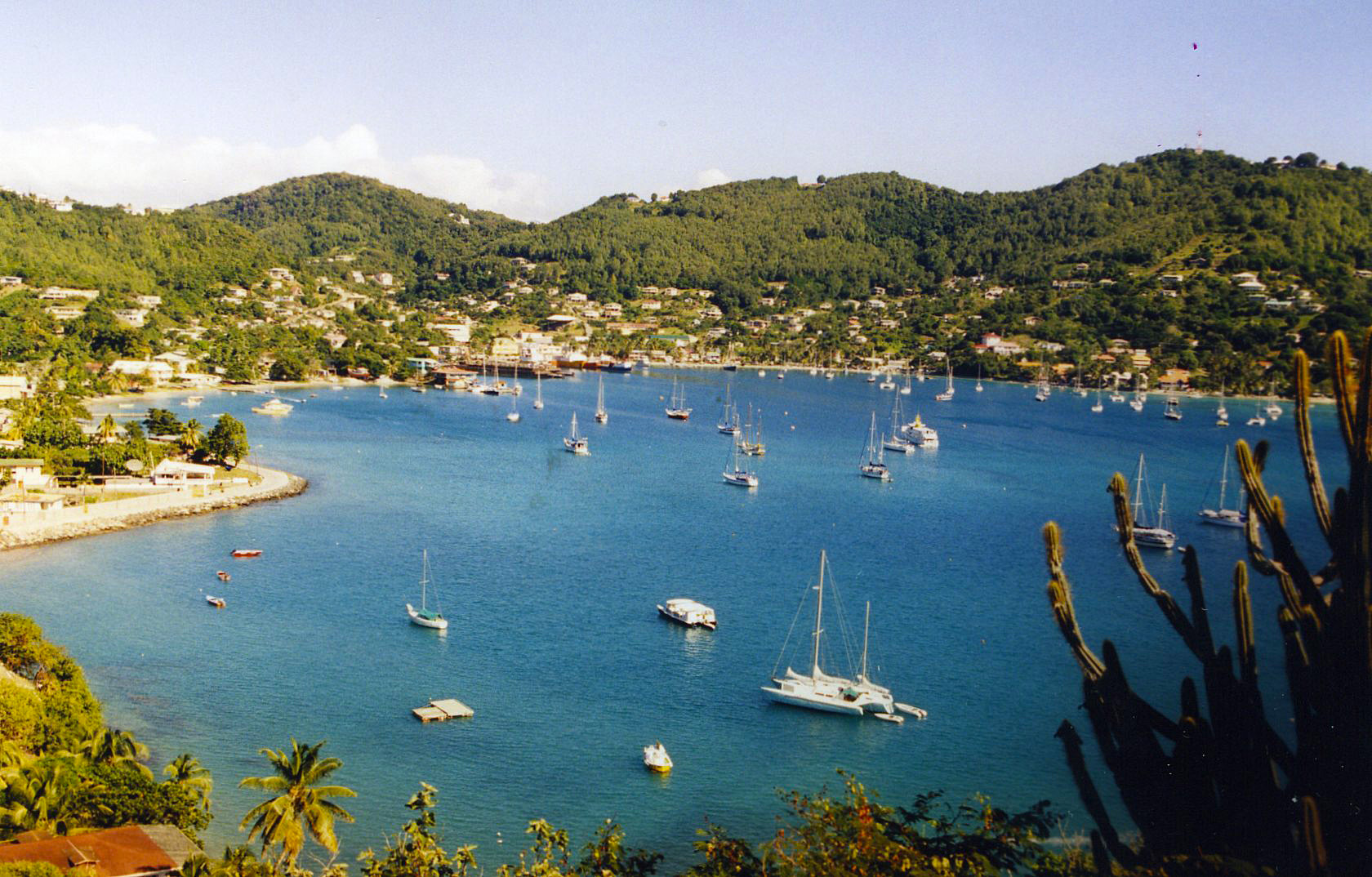
- View of Port Elizabeth

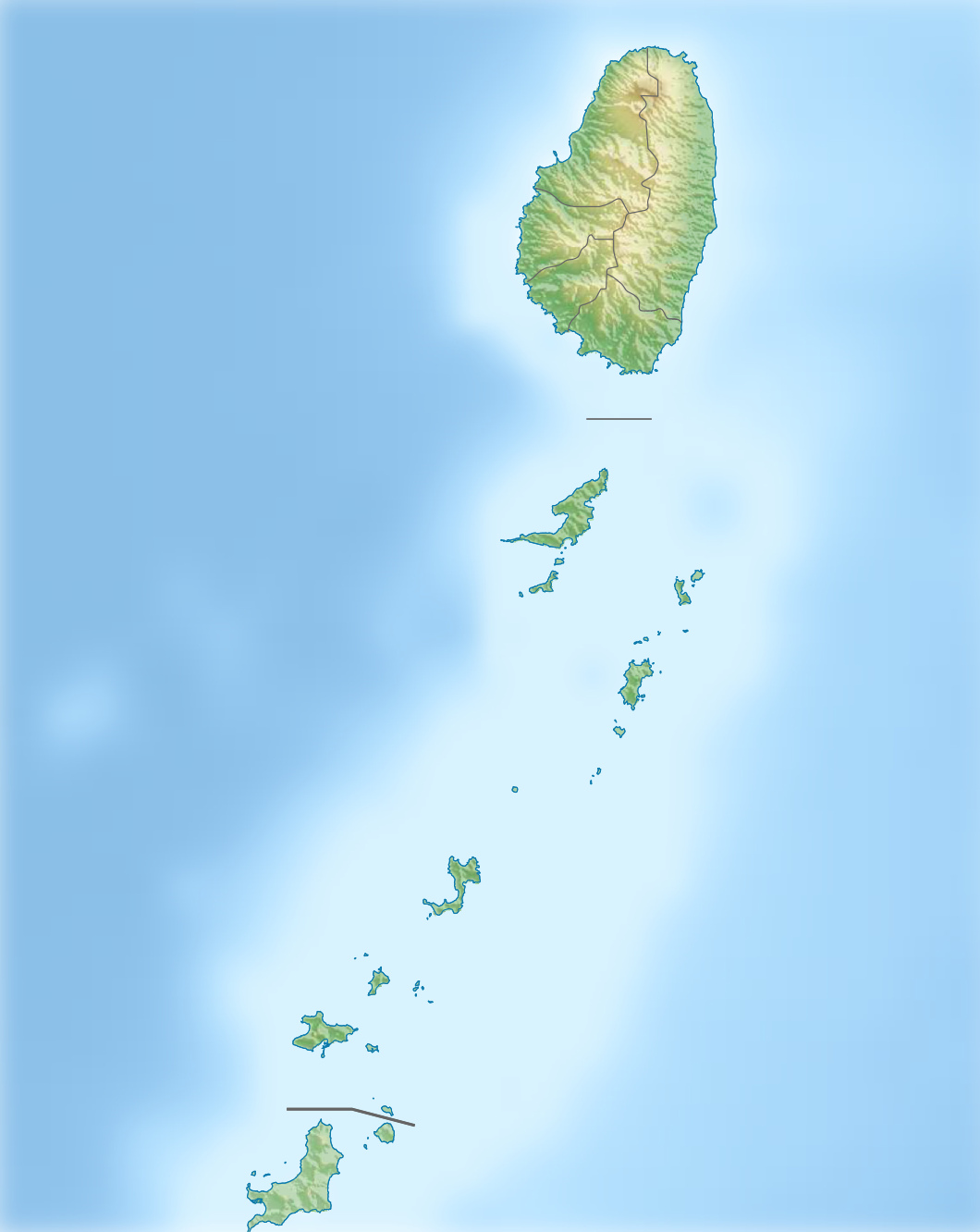
- Location within Saint Vincent and the Grenadines
- Coordinates: 13°00′40″N 61°14′04″W
- Country: Saint Vincent and the Grenadines
- Island: Bequia
- Parish: Grenadines
- Elevation: 32 ft (9.8 m)
- Time zone: UTC-04:00 (AST)

Port Elizabeth is a town located on the island of Bequia, which is part of the Grenadines island chain. It is the capital of Grenadines Parish. The town was named after Princess Elizabeth (later Queen Elizabeth II) in 1937 to commemorate the coronation of her parents.
