= Spring Village, Saint Vincent and the Grenadines =

Spring Village
- Location in Saint Vincent and the Grenadines
- Coordinates: 13°15′N 061°14′W
- Country: Saint Vincent and the Grenadines
- Island: Saint Vincent
- Parish: Saint Patrick

Population
  - Total: 310
- Time zone: Atlantic Standard Time (AST), UTC-4

Spring Village is a village in Saint Patrick Parish on the island of Saint Vincent in Saint Vincent and the Grenadines. It is located to the southeast of Westwood, just to the south of Rose Hall.
