= Stubbs, Saint Vincent and the Grenadines =

Stubbs
- Location in Saint Vincent and the Grenadines
- Coordinates: 13°08′57″N 061°09′35″W
- Country: Saint Vincent and the Grenadines
- Island: Saint Vincent
- Parish: Saint George

Stubbs is a village in Saint George Parish on the island of Saint Vincent in Saint Vincent and the Grenadines. It is located to the east of the capital, Kingstown, at the southern end of Argyle Beach. Stubbs lies on the coast road linking the capital with Georgetown, Saint Vincent and the Grenadines in the island's northeast. The next village to the north of Stubbs is Calder Peruvian Vale.
