= Edinboro, Saint Vincent and the Grenadines =

Edinboro
- Location in Saint Vincent and the Grenadines
- Coordinates: 13°09′N 61°15′W
- Country: Saint Vincent and the Grenadines
- Island: Saint Vincent
- Parish: Saint Andrew Parish

Edinboro is a town located on the outskirts of the capital, Kingstown, Saint Vincent in the country of St. Vincent and the Grenadines. It is located in Saint Andrew Parish and serviced by Argyle International Airport. The town was named after the Scottish capital Edinburgh, from whence its first settlers came. Fort Charlotte, a tourist attraction for the island, is located in Edinboro.
