= Questelles =

- Location in Saint Vincent and the Grenadines
- Coordinates: 13°10′N 061°14′W
- Country: Saint Vincent and the Grenadines
- Island: Saint Vincent
- Parish: Saint Andrew

Questelles is a coastal community in Saint Andrew Parish, Saint Vincent and the Grenadines.

== Submarine feature ==
The seaward face of Questelles Point presents a notable dive site for recreational scuba divers, a near-vertical 'wall' with a brief ledge at around 70 ft. depth. The 'wall' continues down to around 1,300 ft. depth, and then transitions to a 45-degree mud-slope, as assessed by a Johnson Sea Link II submersible investigation, in April 1989.
