= Newtown, Port of Spain =

Newtown Newtown, Port of Spain
- District of Port of Spain
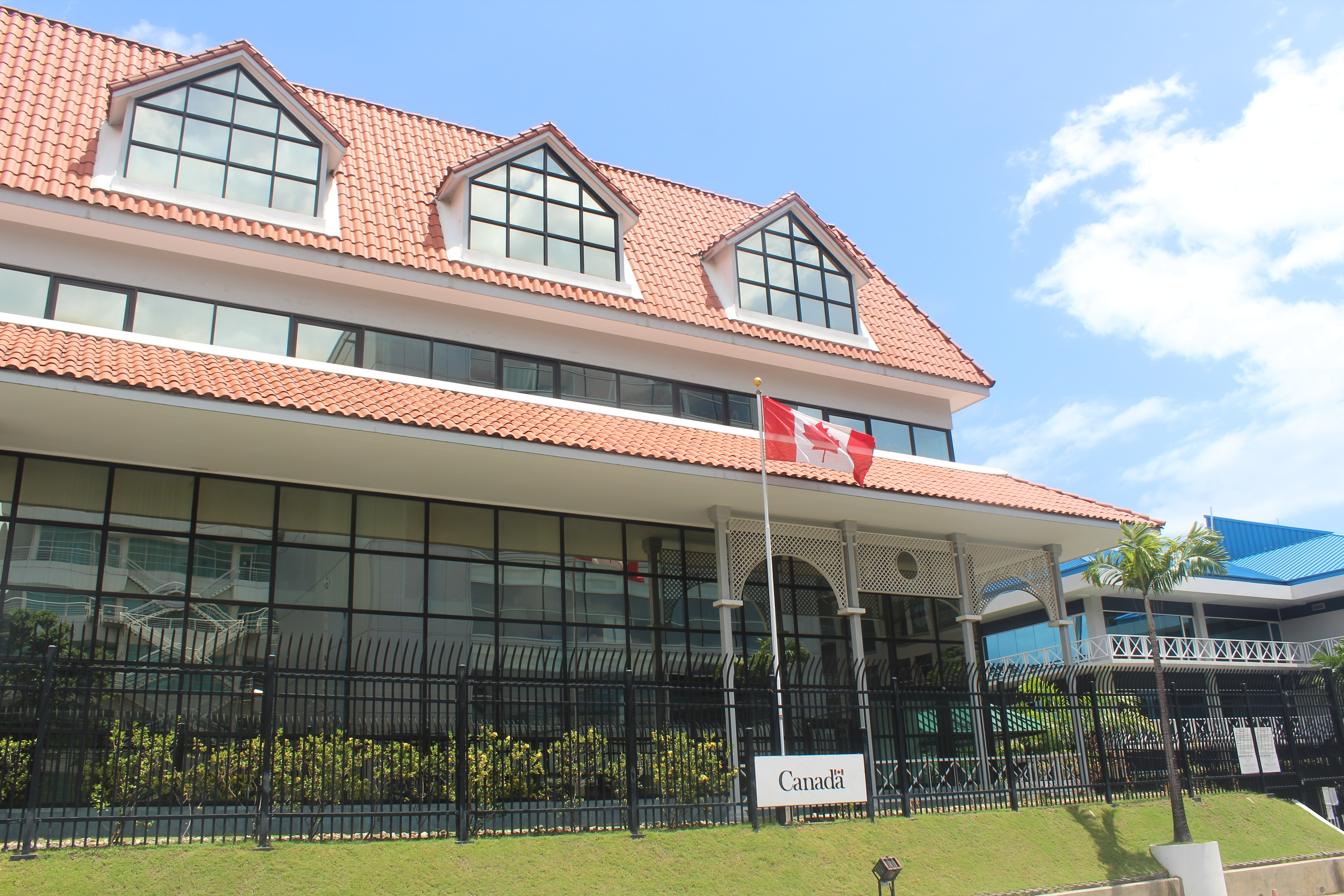
- Canadian High Commission in Newtown, Port of Spain
- Country: Trinidad and Tobago
- County: Saint George County
- City: Port of Spain
- District: Newtown
- Time zone: UTC-4 (AST)
  - Summer (DST): UTC-4 (DST)

Newtown, is a district in the Port of Spain, Trinidad and Tobago. Over the years Newtown has evolved into a well developed business area with large residences being converted into business places or being torn down with the intention to build a more business like location.

Newtown is an Urban and Business Center, which houses restaurants like Jenny's on the Boulevard, Mario's Pizza, and various other businesses, including Trinidad and Tobago Television (TTT), Newtown Medical Center, as well as residents. It also houses the American Embassy, Sagicor, First Citizens Bank, Rituals, Tatil, the Canadian Embassy and the City with Foundations Church.

== Churches ==
One of the older buildings which has retained most of its historical look is the St. Patrick's R.C. Church. In 2014, renovations to the roof and other areas were completed with funds raised by the parishioners over a number of years. This church boasts of several stained glass windows and is styled in a similar manner to the St. Crispin's Anglican Church which is located a few streets away, near Siegert Square. Both churches have antique baptismal fonts at the back of the church.

The City with Foundations Church, located in the Newtown Urban and Business Center (POS, Trinidad and Tobago), was founded by Dr. Glendon Rudder. Rudder also serves as a Special Advisor to I Change Nations (ICN) for Caribbean States, Territories, and Jerusalem, and is the creator of the Human Equity Value Concept and Institute as well as The Pan Evangelistic World Outreach.

== Schools ==
Newtown is one of the areas which had at least one primary school for boys and one for girls, which is the Newtown Boys and Newtown Girls. Known for success in academics and Music Festival competitions, these schools are located on either side of the St. Patrick's R.C. Church with access from Maraval Road.

There are also private secondary schools and Government run schools located in close proximity to Maraval Road and Tragarete Road, such as Wood Brook Secondary School and St. Cecelia's Private Secondary School.

Over the years a branch of a tertiary educational institute, SBCS, has offered its services from two locations on Picton Street.
