= Saint David Parish, Saint Vincent and the Grenadines =

Saint David Parish
- Parish
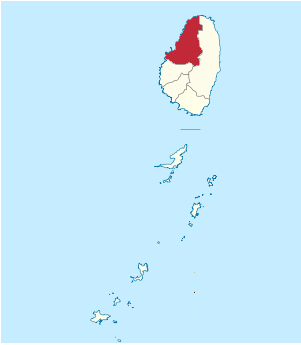
- Coordinates: 13°17′03″N 061°14′29″W
- Country: Saint Vincent and the Grenadines
- Capital City: Chateaubelair

Area
  - Total: 31 sq mi (80 km^{2})
- Elevation: 4,049 ft (1,234 m)

Population
  - Total: 6,700

Saint David is an administrative parish of Saint Vincent and the Grenadines, on the island of Saint Vincent. Its capital is Chateaubelair.

- Area: 80 km^{2} (31 mi^{2})
- Population: 6,700 (2000 estimates)

== Populated places ==
The following populated places are located within the parish of Saint David:

- Chateaubelair (13°17′18″N 061°14′25″W)
- Richmond (13°18′N 061°13′W)
- Richmond Vale (13°17′41″N 061°14′02″W)
- Rosehall (Rose Hall, 13°16′13″N 061°14′25″W)
- Troumaka (13°16′54″N 061°15′25″W)
- Wallibou (13°19′N 061°13′W)
