= Saint Andrew Parish, Saint Vincent and the Grenadines =

Saint Andrew Parish
- Parish
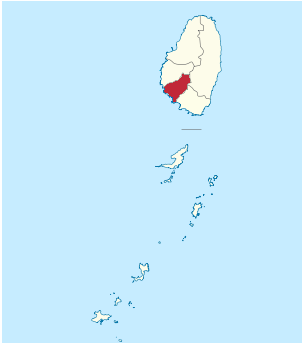
- Map of the Parish of Saint Andrew
- Coordinates: 13°12′00″N 061°15′58″W
- Country: Saint Vincent and the Grenadines
- Capital City: Layou

Area
  - Total: 11 sq mi (29 km^{2})

Population
  - Total: 6,700

Saint Andrew is an administrative parish of Saint Vincent and the Grenadines, on the island of Saint Vincent. Its capital is Layou.

- Area: 29 km² (11 mi²)
- Population: 6,700 (2000 estimates)

== Populated places ==
The following populated places are located in the parish of Saint Andrew:

- Campden Park (13°10′21″N 061°14′29″W)
- Chauncey (13°10′N 061°14′W)
- Clare Valley (13°10′N 061°15′W)
- Dubois (13°11′N 061°14′W)
- Edinboro (13°09′35″N 061°14′11″W)
- Francois (13°12′N 061°13′W)
- Liberty Lodge (13°09′57″N 061°13′54″W)
- Montrose (13°10′N 061°14′W)
- Pembroke (13°11′N 061°15′W)
- Questelles (13°10′N 061°14′W)
- Redemption (13°09′52″N 061°13′46″W)
- Vermont (13°12′N 061°13′W)
