= Saint George Parish, Saint Vincent and the Grenadines =

Saint George
- Parish
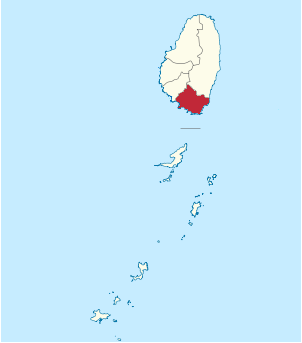
- Map of the Parish of Saint George
- Coordinates: 13°09′35″N 061°13′31″W
- Country: Saint Vincent and the Grenadines
- Capital City: Kingstown

Area
  - Total: 20 sq mi (52 km^{2})

Population
  - Total: 52,400
  - Density: 2,609.9/sq mi (1,007.69/km^{2})

Saint George is an administrative parish of Saint Vincent and the Grenadines, situated in the most southerly portion of the island of Saint Vincent. With an area of 52 km^{2} it is the country's third largest parish by total area. According to the 2000 census it has a population of approximately 52,400 making it the most populous parish in Saint Vincent and the Grenadines and by extent, the most densely populated as well. Its population accounts for 44% of that of the country and its area, only 13%.

Kingstown, the largest settlement and the capital of Saint George, also happens to be the capital of Saint Vincent and the Grenadines. Other major towns include Arnos Vale, Calliaqua, Enhams and Villa. The parish also includes the offshore islets Milligan Cay and Young Island.

== Populated places ==
The following populated places are located in the parish of Saint George:

- Arnos Vale (13°08′33″N 061°12′34″W)
- Belmont (13°09′49″N 061°10′48″W)
- Brighton Village (13°07′57″N 061°10′27″W)
- Calliaqua (13°07′51″N 061°11′34″W)
- Greathead (13°08′39″N 061°13′15″W)
- Kingstown (13°09′28″N 061°13′30″W)
- Ribishi (13°08′53″N 061°11′06″W)
- Stubbs (13°08′57″N 061°09′35″W)
