= Rose Hall, Saint Vincent and the Grenadines =

Rose Hall
- Location in Saint Vincent and the Grenadines
- Coordinates: 13°16′13″N 061°14′25″W
- Country: Saint Vincent and the Grenadines
- Island: Saint Vincent
- Parish: Saint David

Rose Hall at 1,142 feet, is the highest settlement in St. Vincent and the Grenadines. It is located in Saint David Parish on the island of Saint Vincent in Saint Vincent and the Grenadines. It is located to the east of Westwood, south of Rose Bank, just to the north of Spring Village and far west of Byera on the windward coast.
