= Saint Patrick Parish, Saint Vincent and the Grenadines =

Saint Patrick Parish
- Parish
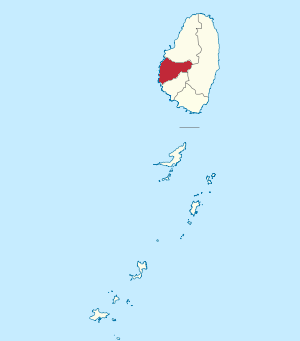
- Map of the Parish of Saint Patrick
- Coordinates: 13°13′59″N 061°16′01″W
- Country: Saint Vincent and the Grenadines
- Capital City: Barrouallie

Area
  - Total: 14 sq mi (37 km^{2})

Population
  - Total: 5,800

Saint Patrick is an administrative parish of Saint Vincent and the Grenadines, on the island of Saint Vincent. According to the 2000 census, it had a population of 5,800, which makes Saint Patrick the least populous parish of Saint Vincent and the Grenadines. The parish consists of the middle portion of the leeward side of the main island. Its capital is Barrouallie.

- Area: 37 km^{2} (14 mi^{2})
- Population: 5,800 (2000 estimates)

== Populated places ==
The following populated places are located within the parish of Saint Patrick:

- Barrouallie (13°14′09″N 061°16′19″W)
- Hermitage (13°14′N 061°13′W)
- Layou (13°12′12″N 061°16′07″W)
- Rutland Vale (13°12′N 061°17′W)
- Spring Village (13°15′N 061°14′W)
