= Audrey Jeffers =

Trinidadian social worker and politician (1898–1968)

Audrey Jeffers CM, OBE
- Born: Audrey Layne Jeffers (12 February 1898; Woodbrook, Port of Spain, Trinidad
- Died: 24 June 1968 (aged 70); Trinidad
- Education: Tranquillity Girls School; Alexander College, London
- Occupation: Social worker
- Known for: First female member of the Legislative Council of Trinidad and Tobago
- Relatives: Tony Martin (nephew)

Audrey Layne Jeffers CM, OBE (12 February 1898 – 24 June 1968) was a Trinidadian social worker and the first female member of the Legislative Council of Trinidad and Tobago.

== Life ==
Born in Woodbrook, Port of Spain, Trinidad, to an upper-middle-class family, Jeffers was educated at Tranquillity Girls School and went to England when she was aged 15, later taking a diploma in social science at Alexander College, north London. While in London, she was involved in founding the Union of Students of African Descent, which would become known as the League of Coloured Peoples. After the outbreak of the First World War, she worked among West African troops and set up a West African soldiers' fund, mobilising financial contributions from fellow West Indians.

She returned to Trinidad in 1920 and ran a junior school in her family home, Briarsend. Moved by the sufferings of the underprivileged and dispossessed, she established the Coterie of Social Workers in 1921, which provided free lunches to poor school children. The first "Breakfast Shed" was established in Port of Spain in 1926. Others were established in Barataria, San Fernando, Trinidad and Tobago, Siparia and Tobago. They went on to establish homes for the elderly, the blind, "women in distress" and day nurseries. The first day nursery, established in John John, Port of Spain, was named Cipriani House after the labour leader Arthur Andrew Cipriani.

In 1936, Jeffers became the first woman elected to the Port of Spain City Council. In 1946, she was appointed to the Legislative Council by Governor Sir Bede Clifford.

She was appointed an Officer of the Order of the British Empire in 1959. In 1969, she was posthumously awarded the Chaconia Gold Medal for Social Service.

Her nephew was the historian Tony Martin.

== Legacy ==
The Audrey Jeffers Highway is named in her honour. Her legacy also lives on in The Coterie of Social Workers of Trinidad and Tobago, who continue to honour her memory by celebrations and commemorations.
