= Chateaubelair =

Village in Saint Vincent, Saint Vincent and the Grenadines

- Location in Saint Vincent and the Grenadines
- Coordinates: 13°17′18″N 061°14′25″W
- Country: Saint Vincent and the Grenadines
- Island: Saint Vincent
- Parish: Saint David

Population (2012)
  - Total: 5,756

Chateaubelair is a town on the Leeward (west) coast of the Caribbean island of Saint Vincent, the main island of Saint Vincent and the Grenadines. It is located just south of the volcano of Soufrière. Commonly referred to as just "Chateau", it is the focus and the largest community in the North Leeward constituency of St. Vincent, and the fourth largest town in the country.

Local attractions include Trinity Falls, Dark View Falls, and rock carvings which are an archaeological find and are believed to have been left by the Indigenous Kalinago people.

The local economy is mainly supported by farming.

In the 1790s, Chateaubelair was the scene of some parts of the anti-British rebellion led by Joseph Chatoyer.

== Chateaubelair Island ==
As a geological extension of Chateaubelair Point out to the North, Chateaubelair Island protrudes into deep water, providing scuba-divers with a dramatic 'wall' dive, similar to that found at Questelles.

== See also ==
- Saint David Parish
