= Calliaqua =

- Location in Saint Vincent and the Grenadines
- Coordinates: 13°07′51″N 061°11′34″W
- Country: Saint Vincent and the Grenadines
- Island: Saint Vincent
- Parish: Saint George

Population (2012)
  - Total: 24,205

Calliaqua is a town in Saint Vincent and the Grenadines.

It is located in the far south of the main island of Saint Vincent, close to the island's southernmost point.

The town is home to a local fishing market, a local basketball court, sports field, as well as restaurants and bars.

== Notable Person ==
- Actor Franklyn Seales, best known for his portrayal as Dexter Stuffins in the 80s sitcom Silver Spoons, was born in Calliqua.
