= Layou =

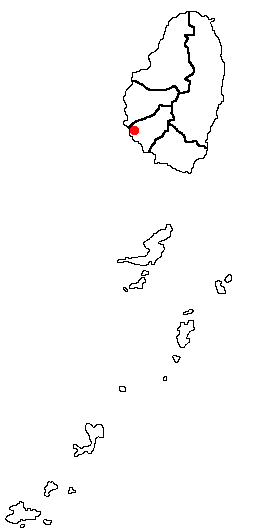
- Layou in Saint Vincent and the Grenadines
- Coordinates: 13°12′12″N 061°16′07″W
- Country: Saint Vincent and the Grenadines
- Island: Saint Vincent
- Parish: Saint Andrew

Layou is a small town located on the island of Saint Vincent, in Saint Andrew Parish. It has two quarries, a post office, a police station and a library.

== History ==
Layou is located on the western coast of Saint Vincent and the Grenadines and was one of the first areas of settlement by the French, who were the first Europeans to settle in St. Vincent and The Grenadines in the early part of the eighteenth century. Even before then the Caribs used it as one of their settlements, as it is evident from the petroglyphs which are found in the area.

In 1763, St. Vincent was taken over by the British and the lands in Layou were bought by them to cultivate sugar. Layou was still a small area formed around Jackson Bay. The cultivation of sugar cane started growing and larger estates were needed, so that the smaller holdings of the French were consolidated into larger estates.

There were 3 main estates: Ruthland Vale estate, Akers estate and Palmiste Park estate. During slavery, most people lived on the estates but began to leave after slavery was abolished and to establish villages.

Immediately after Emancipation, the lands of one of the estates, Akers, were sold to form Cowdrey's Village. In 1861, Layou had a population of 140 people, Cowdrey's Village 227, while 333 people lived on the Ruthland Vale estate, 15 on what remained of the Akers estate and just five at the Palmiste Park estate.

The Ruthland Vale estate was sold after the eruption of the La Soufriere volcano in 1902. 450 acres (1.8 km^{2}) were set aside for refugees from areas affected by the eruption.

Other changes began to take place in the area. The owner of what remained of the Ruthland Vale estates began to sell land to residents of Layou, and also residents of the estates began to move into Layou because employment possibilities on the estates were decreasing. Added to this, estate residents wanted to take advantage of social amenities, the school, clinic, church and cricket pitch among others. This led to an increase in population of Layou and also an enlargement of the town, since many of the smaller villages and estates settlements eventually became incorporated into the town of Layou.

Layou is located in the Constituency of Central Leeward.

== Geography ==
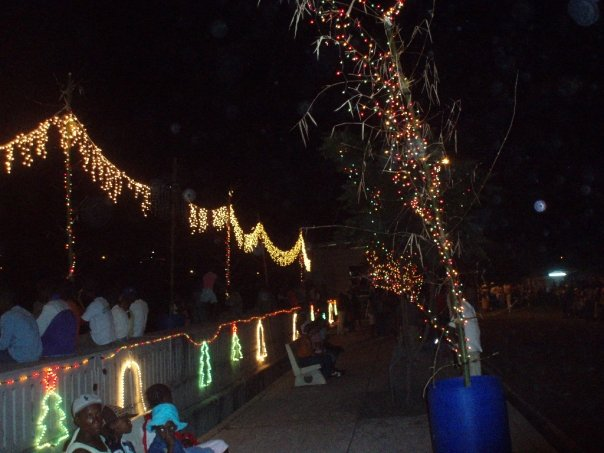
Christmas lights on the waterfront

Layou is located on the western coast of the island of Saint Vincent and the Grenadines. Located after the small fishing village of Buccament and before the town of Barrouallie on the Central leeward highway.

== Climate ==
Layou has a seasonal tropical climate with a wet season lasting from May to November and a dry season lasting from January to May.

== Urban structure ==
Layou is divided into various sections:

East:

- Cowdrey's Village
- Akers

Downtown:

- Bottom Garden
- Plan
- Bethrome

Uptown

- Swamp Gut
- Texier Road
- Ruthland Vale

West

- Bambereux

== Education ==
Layou serves as an important educational centre for the people of Layou, Buccament and surrounding areas. The Layou Government School is located downtown in the Plan district of Layou. The Louis Straker Resource Centre is also an educational facility for evening classes and learning and literacy programs.

== Petroglyphs ==
The petroglyphs in Layou are a short distance inland from the Leeward Highway in Layou. They are more visible if outlined them with a chalk. They were made by the Island Caribs before the 18th century.
