= Barrouallie =

- Location in Saint Vincent and the Grenadines
- Coordinates: 13°14′09″N 061°16′19″W
- Country: Saint Vincent and the Grenadines
- Island: Saint Vincent
- Parish: Saint Patrick

Population (2012)
  - Total: 5,884

Barrouallie is a town located on the island of Saint Vincent. Barrouallie was established by French settlers in 1719, the first European colony on St. Vincent. Once it was the capital of St.Vincent and the Grenadines. With the rest of the island, it passed back and forth between the French and the British, finally remaining in the hands of the latter.

Within Saint Patrick Parish Barrouallie is both the largest city and the parish capital. The area is known for fishing and is famous for "blackfish". Due to the surrounding mountains, the town is shaped into a hole that over time has protected the town from volcanic eruptions.

== History ==
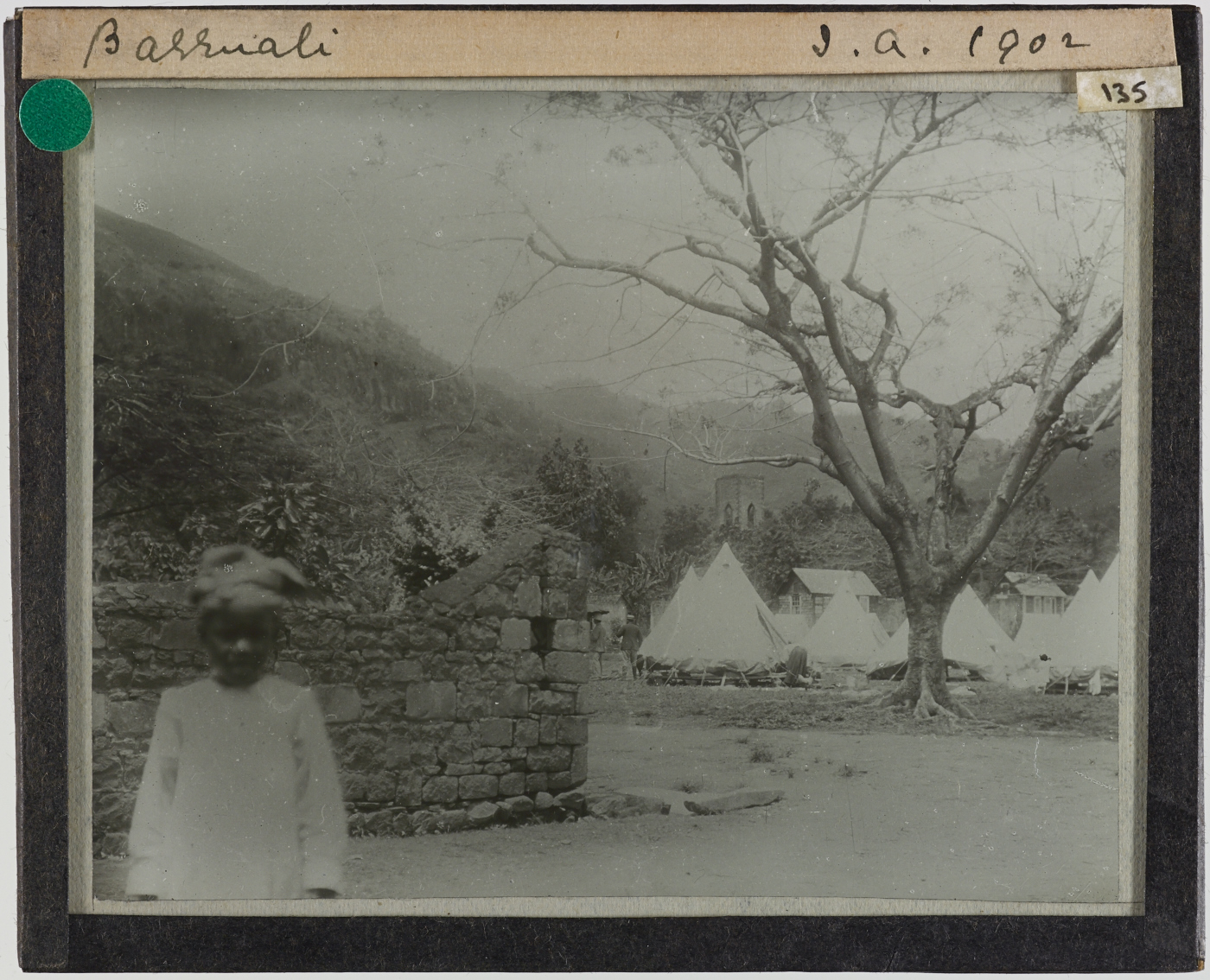
Barrouallie, tent camp for people displaced by the 1902 eruption of the Soufrière

The Native American Caribs who lived in what would become Barrouallie left a petroglyph which would become a well-known a local landmark. The figure depicted has a stylized head surrounded by a halo of thirteen rays.

While the English were the first to lay claim to St. Vincent island in 1627, the French centered on the island of Martinique would be the first European settlers on the island when they established their first colony at Barrouallie on the Leeward side of St. Vincent in 1719. The French settlers cultivated coffee, tobacco, indigo, corn, and sugar on plantations worked by African slaves. In the time of slavery, Barrouallie was the center of a sugar cane-growing area on the leeward coast of Saint Vincent, with a number of flourishing estates on the nearby volcanic slopes. It was renowned for its beautiful little Anglican Church with a distinguished bell tower and black and white marble tiles (brought as ballast on the sugar ships) on the floor of its interior.

The Emancipation of Slaves in the British Empire, resolved on by the British Parliament in 1833 and actually implemented in St. Vincent and other Caribbean islands by 1838, proved a mixed blessing - releasing people from bondage but also causing an economic crisis in a society hitherto based on slave labor. This was exacerbated by the rise of beet sugar cultivation in Europe.

The local people's situation was precarious, and many of them emigrated to other islands in an effort to escape the poverty. Among these were Caroline Arindell, who was born in Barrouallie about 1850, and her husband John McShine - both of whom emigrated in the 1860s to Trinidad, where their descendants were to become well-known.

On September 11, 1898, six hours of a terrible hurricane devastated St. Vincent in general and Barrouallie in particular. The Church and almost all houses were destroyed. A photo of Barrouallie taken in the direct aftermath shows only two or three houses still with their roofs.

It took considerable time for Barrouallie to recover from this blow, and the destruction of the Church's records was an irreversible blow to knowledge of local history.

== See also ==
- Saint Vincent and the Grenadines
