= Kingstown =

Capital of Saint Vincent and the Grenadines

- Capital city
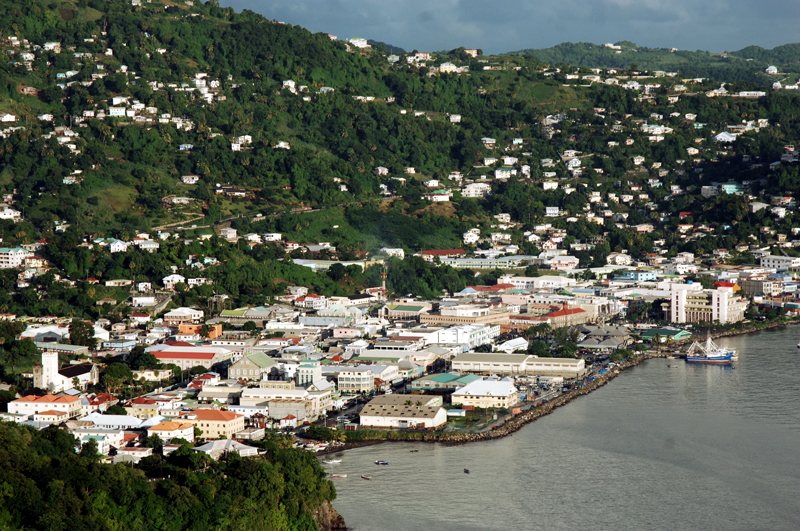
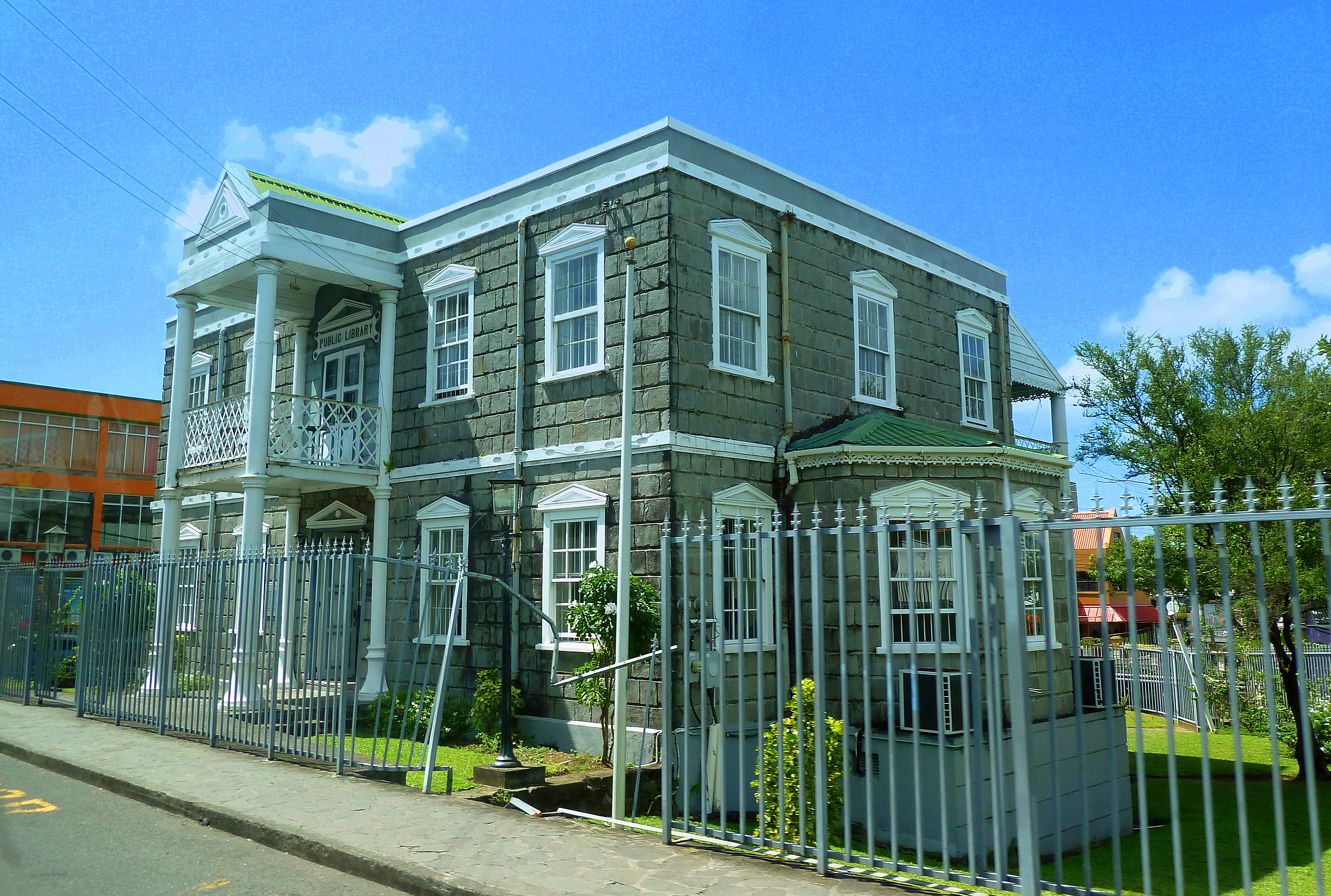
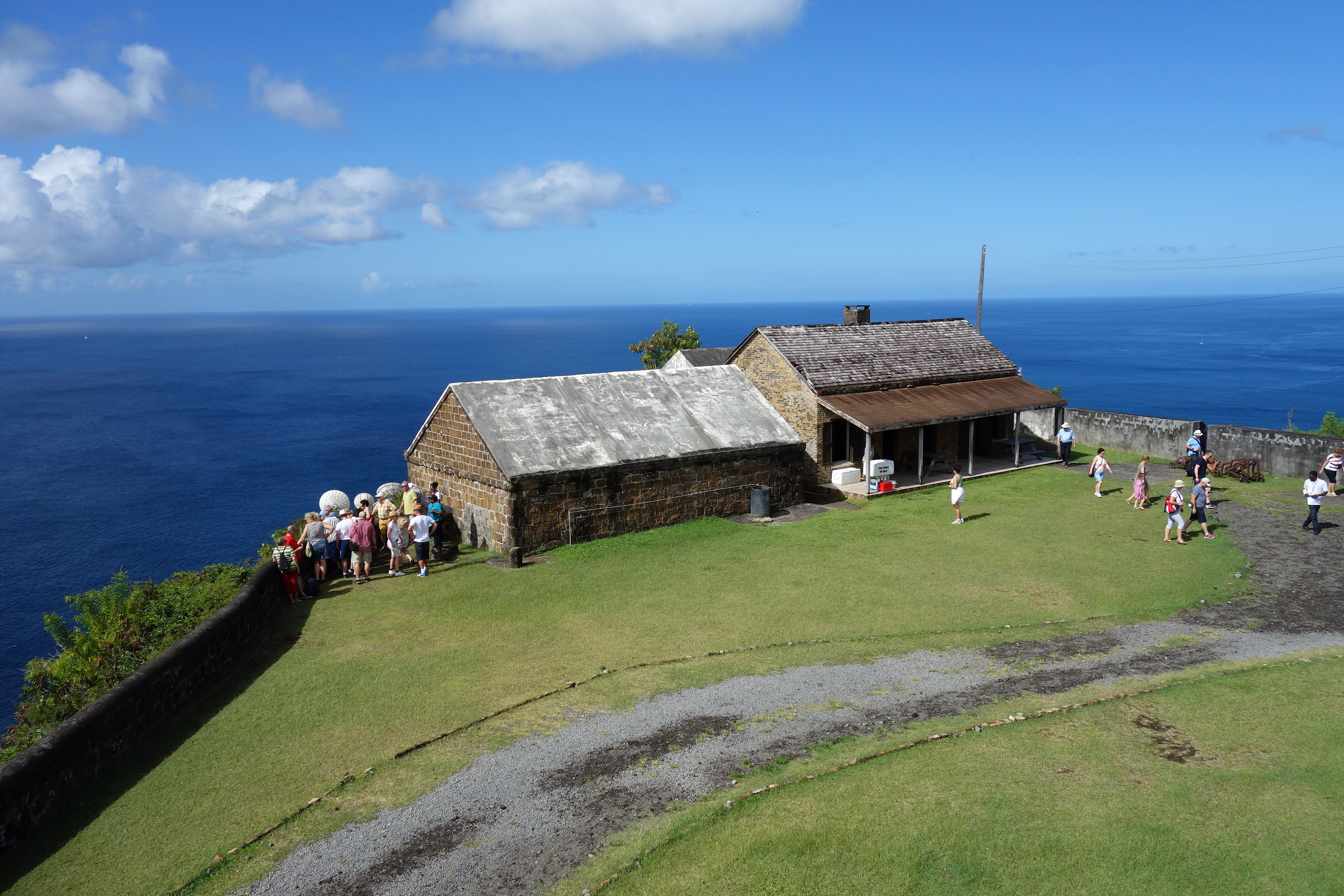
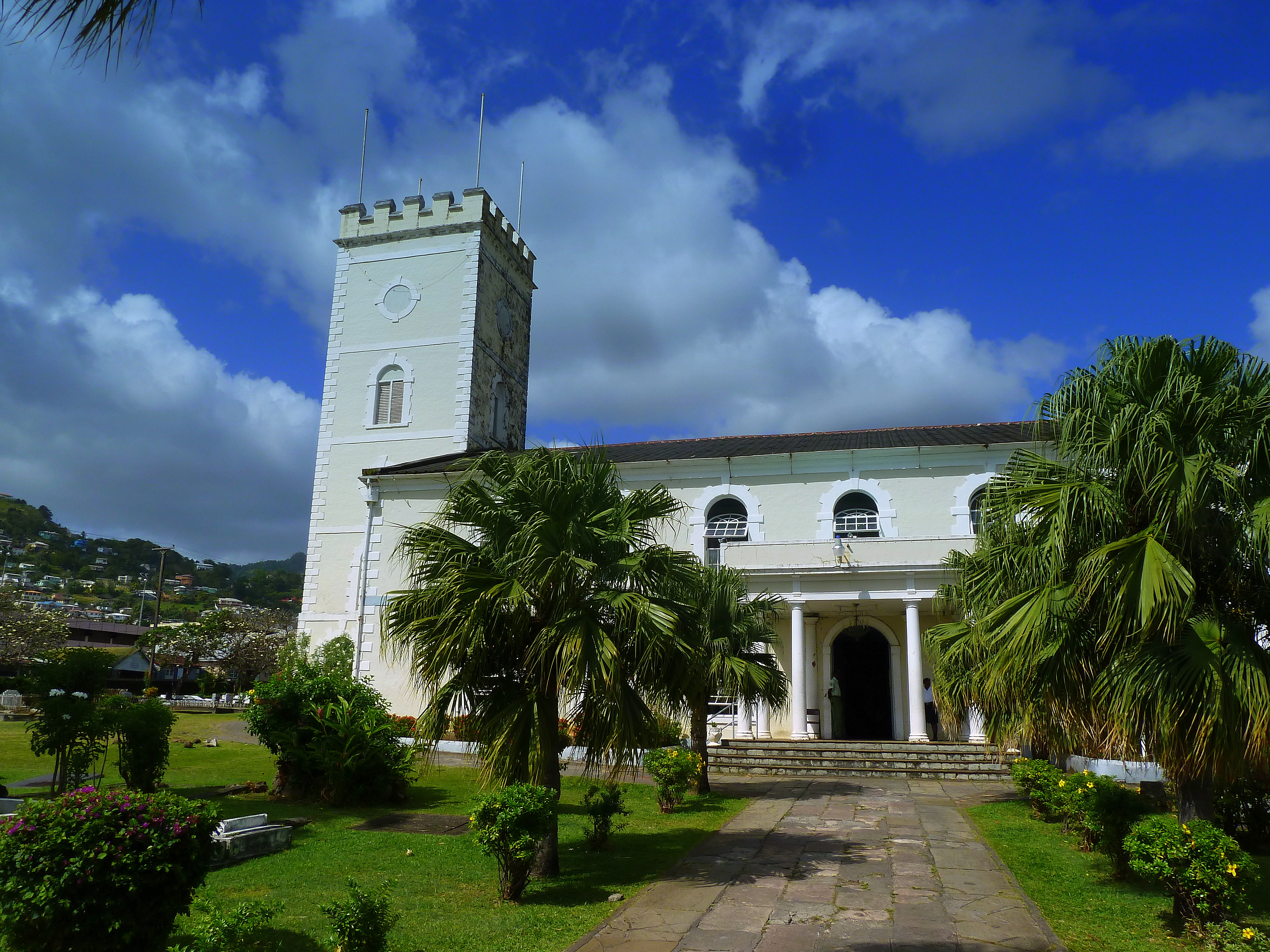
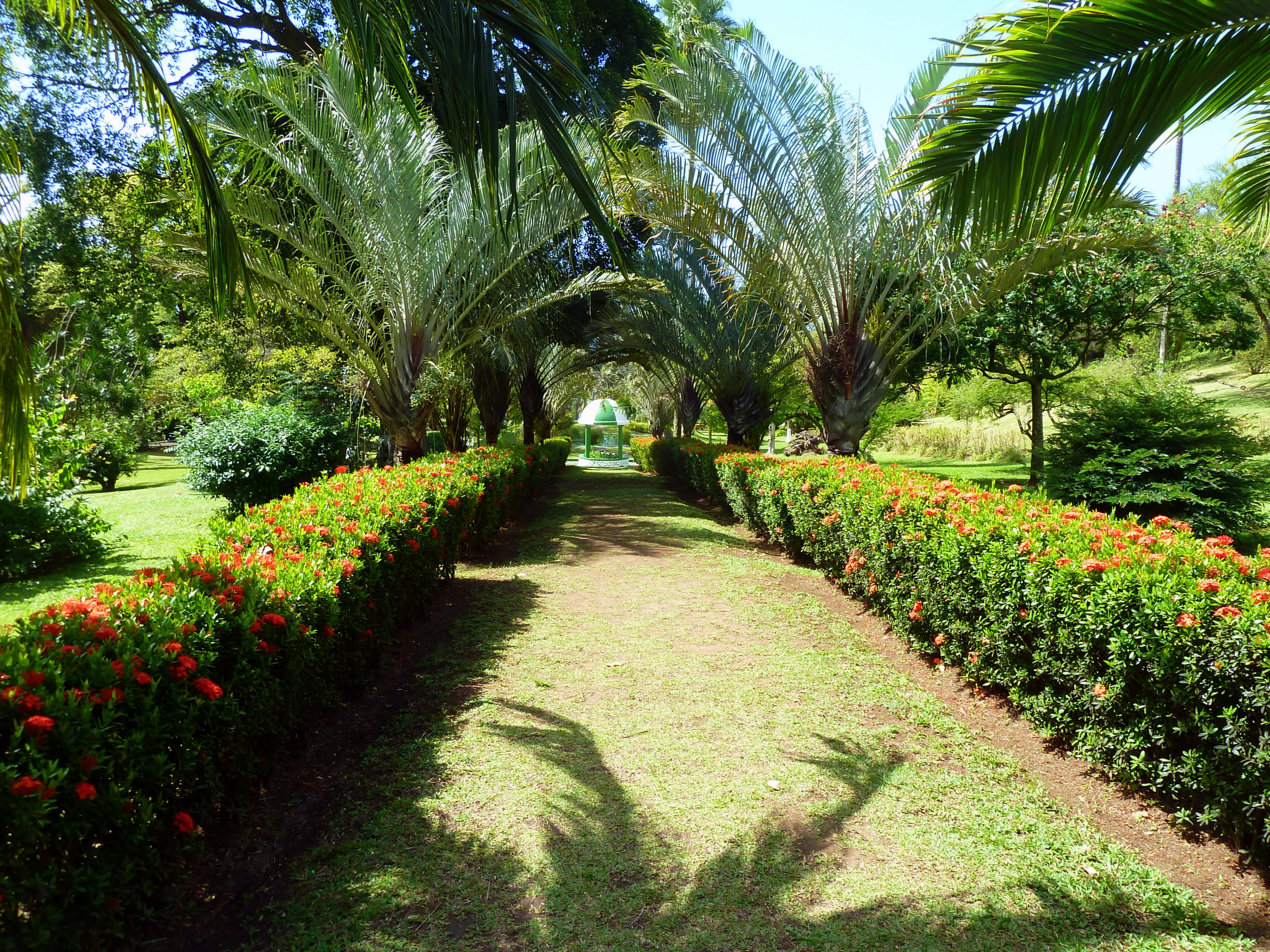
- Top: Aerial view of Kingstown; Middle: Carnegie Old Public Library, Fort Charlotte; Bottom: St. George's Cathedral, Saint Vincent and the Grenadines Botanic Gardens
- Nickname: City Of Arches
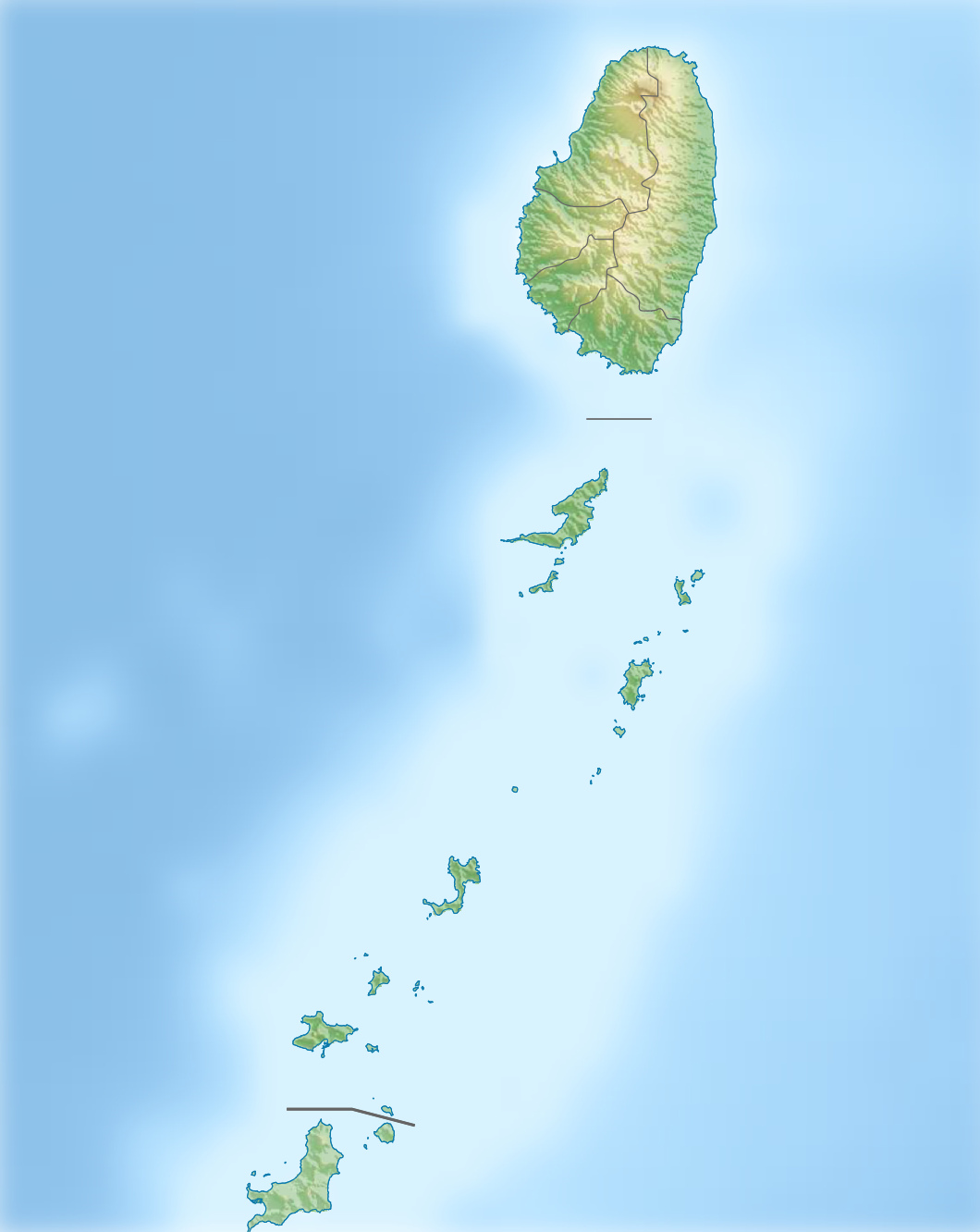
- Location within Saint Vincent and the Grenadines Location within North America
- Coordinates: 13°09′28″N 61°13′30″W
- Country: Saint Vincent and the Grenadines
- Island: Saint Vincent
- Parish: Saint George
- Founded: 1722
- Constituencies: East Kingstown; Central Kingstown; West Kingstown

Government
  - MPs: Fitzgerald Bramble; St Clair Leacock; Daniel Cummings
- Elevation: 112 ft (34 m)

Population (2012)
  - Total: 12,909
- Time zone: UTC-04:00 (AST)
- Area code: 784
- Climate: Aw

Kingstown /ˈkɪŋsˌtaʊn/ is the capital and largest city of Saint Vincent and the Grenadines. The city, located on the main island of Saint Vincent, has the main port and the biggest commercial center of the islands. With a population of 12,909 (2012), Kingstown is the most populous settlement in the country. It is the island's agricultural industry centre and a port of entry for tourists. The city lies within the parish of Saint George in the south-west corner of Saint Vincent.

== History ==
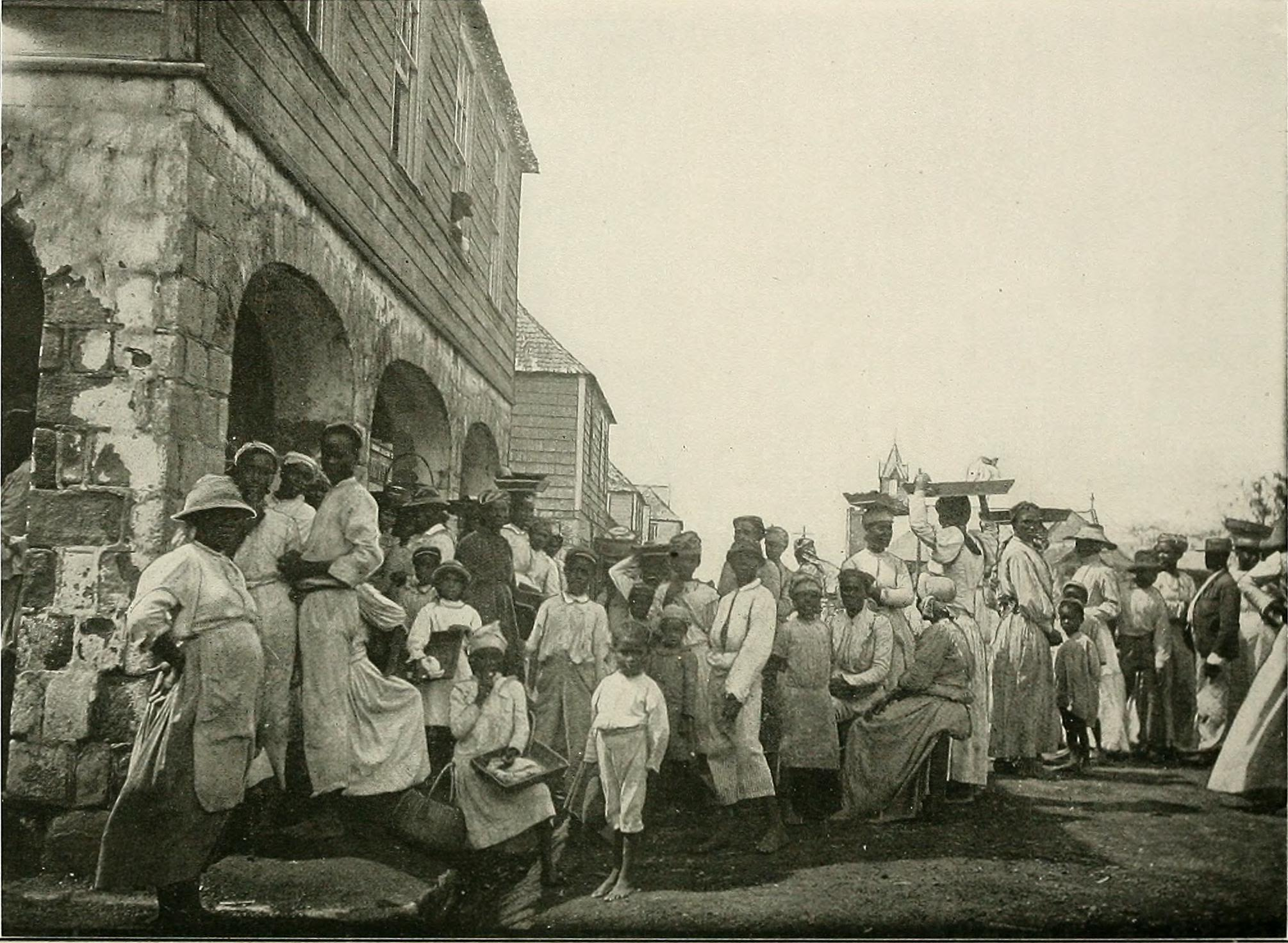
People of Kingstown, ca. 1902

The modern capital, Kingstown, was founded by French settlers shortly after 1722, although Saint Vincent was under British rule for 196 years before its independence.

The botanical garden, conceived in 1765, is one of the oldest in the Western Hemisphere. William Bligh, made famous from the mutiny on the Bounty, brought seed of the breadfruit tree here for planting, c. 1793.

During the Second Carib War the fort at Dorsetshire Hill, just outside the city, was taken by rebels on 12 March 1795.

In 1841, three militia men fired their guns into the air to celebrate the end of their duty. They were arrested for riotous behaviour, but a crowd of people protested their arrest. A riot involving 200 to 300 people broke out after a police officer knocked down a woman and this resulted in the destruction of the police station. 30 people were convicted for participating in the riot. Multiple riots broke out under Governor Edward John Eyre.

Plans for water supply were conceived in 1866, after a large fire destroyed large sections of the town, but this was not completed until 1871.

Minister of Finance Camillo Gonsalves announced in 2025 that the government was going to rename areas of the country as part of a decolonization project. Kingstown was included among the areas to be renamed.

== Demographics ==
There were around 3,000 people in Kingstown in 1825, and this rose to 4,769 by 1844, and 5,101 by 1861, despite cholera and small pox epidemics in the 1850s. In 1861, people under 30 accounted for 67% of the population and those under 20 accounted for 47%. Over 60% of the population was female.

The population of Kingstown fell from 17,117 in 1970, to 16,998 in 1980, and to 15,670 in 1991. From 1980 to 1991, Kingstown saw a 7.81% decline in its population while its suburbs expanded by 25.56%. 43.90% of the population lived in Kingstown, its suburbs, and Calliaqua in 1991.

== Geography ==
=== Topography ===
The town is surrounded by steep hills.

=== Climate ===
Climate data for Kingstown（temperature, precipitation, humidity 1991～2021/sunshine hours 1999～2019）
Month	Jan	Feb	Mar	Apr	May	Jun	Jul	Aug	Sep	Oct	Nov	Dec	Year
Mean daily maximum °C (°F)	25.7 (78.3)	25.7 (78.3)	26.1 (79.0)	26.7 (80.1)	27.3 (81.1)	27.3 (81.1)	27.2 (81.0)	27.4 (81.3)	27.7 (81.9)	27.4 (81.3)	26.9 (80.4)	26.3 (79.3)	26.8 (80.3)
Daily mean °C (°F)	24.8 (76.6)	24.7 (76.5)	25.0 (77.0)	25.6 (78.1)	26.2 (79.2)	26.2 (79.2)	26.1 (79.0)	26.4 (79.5)	26.7 (80.1)	26.5 (79.7)	26.0 (78.8)	25.5 (77.9)	25.8 (78.5)
Mean daily minimum °C (°F)	23.9 (75.0)	23.7 (74.7)	24.0 (75.2)	24.6 (76.3)	25.2 (77.4)	25.3 (77.5)	25.1 (77.2)	25.3 (77.5)	25.6 (78.1)	25.4 (77.7)	25.0 (77.0)	24.6 (76.3)	24.8 (76.7)
Average rainfall mm (inches)	49 (1.9)	32 (1.3)	34 (1.3)	45 (1.8)	62 (2.4)	105 (4.1)	132 (5.2)	155 (6.1)	152 (6.0)	162 (6.4)	147 (5.8)	67 (2.6)	1,142 (44.9)
Average rainy days	11	9	8	8	11	14	17	18	15	17	16	12	156
Average relative humidity (%)	76	74	74	76	77	78	80	81	80	80	80	77	78
Mean daily sunshine hours	8.8	9.0	9.2	9.4	9.5	9.4	9.3	9.1	9.0	8.5	8.5	8.7	9.0
Source: "Climate Data".

== See also ==
- Saint George Parish

== Works cited ==
=== Books ===
- Murphy, Tessa (2021). The Creole Archipelago: Race and Borders in the Colonial Caribbean. University of Pennsylvania Press. ISBN 9780812299977.

=== Journals ===
- Boa, Sheena (2002). ""Setting the Law in Defiance": Urban Protests and Lieutenent-Governor Edward John Eyre in Post-Emancipation St. Vincent, 1838-1861". Caribbean Studies. 30 (2). University of Puerto Rico, Río Piedras Campus: 130–169. doi:10.2307/25613374. JSTOR 25613374.
- Potter, Robert (1992). "Migrations et frontière: le cas de Saint-Martin". Geography. 77 (4). Taylor & Francis: 374–376. doi:10.2307/40572260. JSTOR 40572260.

=== News ===
- "SVG to phase out Colonial-era names of places". St. Vincent Times. 27 May 2025. Archived from the original on 9 July 2025.
