= Fancy =

Fancy may refer to:

== Music ==
=== Artists ===
- Fancy (band), an early-mid 1970s pop group
- Fancy (singer), German Eurodance and Eurodisco artist Manfred Alois Segieth (born 1946)

=== Albums ===
- Fancy (Bobbie Gentry album), 1970
- Fancy (Idiot Flesh album), 1997
- Fancy (video), a 2007 video album by Les Claypool

=== Songs ===
- "Fancy" (Bobbie Gentry song), 1969, covered by Reba McEntire in 1990
- "Fancy" (Drake song), 2010
- "Fancy" (Iggy Azalea song), 2014
- "Fancy" (Twice song), 2019
- "Fancy" a song by The Kinks from Face to Face (1966)
- "Fancy", a song by Destiny's Child from Survivor (2001)
- "Fancy", a song by Doja Cat from Amala (2018)
- "Fancy", a song by Fitz and the Tantrums on the deluxe edition of Let Yourself Free (2023)

=== Other music ===
- Fantasia (music), also known as fancy, a type of musical composition
- Fancies, a choral composition and an album by John Rutter

== People ==
- Fancy (given name)
- Fancy (surname)

== Fictional characters ==
- Arthur Fancy, on the TV series NYPD Blue
- Fancy Crane, on the soap opera Passions
- Fancy-Fancy, in the animated sitcom series Top Cat
- Fancy Lala, the main character of the Japanese anime series of the same name
- 'Fancy' Smith on UK TV's Z Cars

== Places ==
- Fancy, Saint Vincent and the Grenadines, a settlement
- Fancy River, Saint Vincent and the Grenadines

== Ships ==
- HMS Fancy, three Royal Navy vessels
- USS Fancy (AM-234), a World War II minesweeper
- Fancy (pirate ship), a frigate commanded by pirate Henry Every from 1694 to 1695
- Fancy, involved in the Capture of the schooner Fancy in 1723

== Other uses ==
- Fancy.com, a social photo sharing website and app

== See also ==
- Fancy Farm (disambiguation)
- Fancy goods
