= Bonhomme =

Bonhomme, Bon Homme or Bonhommes may refer to:

== Places ==
- Le Bonhomme, a village and commune in the Haut-Rhin département of north-eastern France
- Col du Bonhomme, Vosges Mountains, France, a mountain pass
- Bonhomme, a community in the city of Chesterfield, Missouri, United States
- Bonhomme Township, St. Louis County, Missouri
- Bonhomme Creek, Missouri
- Bon Homme County, South Dakota, United States

== Other uses ==
- Bonhomme (surname)
- Brothers of Penitence, a religious order also known as the Bonhommes
- Bonhomme, a name used for the heretical Albigensian sect's Elect Parfait
- Bonhomme, the ambassador of the Quebec City Winter Carnival
- "Bonhomme", a song by Georges Brassens, French singer-songwriter and poet

== See also ==
- Grand Bonhomme, a mountain on the island of Saint Vincent
- "Petit bonhomme", the Luxembourgish entry in the Eurovision Song Contest 1962
- Bonhomme Richard (disambiguation), several meanings
- "Jacques Bonhomme", a nickname for Guillaume Cale (died 1358), leader of the Jacquerie
- Jacques Bonhomme, a derisive name given to French peasants by the nobility - see Jacquerie
