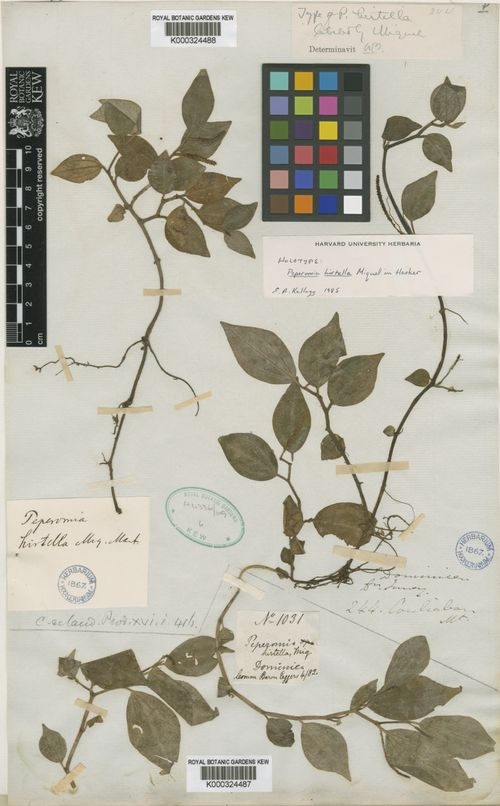

Scientific classification
- Kingdom: Plantae
- Clade: Embryophytes
- Clade: Tracheophytes
- Clade: Angiosperms
- Clade: Magnoliids
- Order: Piperales
- Family: Piperaceae
- Genus: Peperomia
- Species: P. vincentiana

Binomial name
- Peperomia vincentiana Miq.

= Peperomia vincentiana =

Species of epiphyte

Peperomia vincentiana is a species of epiphyte from the genus Peperomia. It was first described by Friedrich Anton Wilhelm Miquel and published in the book "London Journal of Botany 4: 415. 1845.". Its etymology came from "Saint Vincent".

== Distribution ==
It is endemic to Saint Vincent and the Grenadines and Grenada.

- Grenada
  - Qua Qua
  - Saint Catherine
  - Grand Etang
- Saint Vincent and the Grenadines
  - Richmond Peak
  - Richmond River
  - Grand Bonhomme
  - Cumberland Valley

== Description ==
Creeping, filiform, vaguely branched succulent, with erect branches and tenderly pubescent petioles, alternate leaves shortly petioled, lower broad-elliptic rounded or ovate, upper elliptic obtuse, base usually acute, fleshy on both sides with very tender pubescence quickly glabrous, above bright green, subtly pale brown-dotted single-nerved, solitary terminal anthers shortly pedunculated with terete strict remotiflora. Close to the preceding, the shape of the leaves is distinct. Branches filiform dichotomously or oppositely branched. Petiole 2 mm. long leaves 5–10 mm. long 4-7 wide, whitish below and dotted with slowly raised brown glands, almost completely glabrous when grown. Peduncles glabrous or glabrous, 3–5 mm. long, catkins 3-4 cent. long straight Bracts shortly pedicellate-peltate orbicular brown and punctate. Ovary elliptic at the stigmatic apex. Filaments short, bilocular whitish anthers.
