= List of rivers of Saint Vincent and the Grenadines =

This is a list of rivers of Saint Vincent and the Grenadines. Rivers are listed in clockwise order, starting at the north end of the island.

== Saint Vincent ==
- Fancy River
- Rabacca Dry River
- Caratal River
- Grand Sable River
- Byera River
- Colonarie River
- Union River
- Yambou River
- Greathead River
- Buccament River
- Rutland River
- Cumberland River
- Richmond River
- Wallibou River (Wallilabou River)
- River 14 (South Rivers)
