= Union River =

The Union River is the name of multiple rivers.

In the United States

- Union River (Maine)
- Union River (Michigan)
- Union River (Washington)

Other

- Union River (St. Vincent) in Saint Vincent and the Grenadines
