= Fancy Farm =

Fancy Farm may refer to:

- Fancy Farm, Kentucky, a census-designated place
- Fancy Farm (Bedford, Virginia), a plantation home on the National Register of Historic Places

== See also ==
- Fancy's Family Farm, a community farm and tourist attraction in Dorset, England
