= Harold Stead =

Vincentian priest

Harold Craddock Stead was an Anglican priest in the twentieth century.

He was educated at Salisbury Theological College; and ordained in 1957. After a curacy in Eastleigh he was the Rector of Layou and Buccament from 1962 to 1966 when he became Archdeacon of St Vincent.
