= Richland Park =

- Location in Saint Vincent and the Grenadines
- Coordinates: 13°12′N 061°10′W
- Country: Saint Vincent and the Grenadines
- Island: Saint Vincent
- Parish: Charlotte

Richland Park is a village in Charlotte Parish on the island of Saint Vincent in Saint Vincent and the Grenadines. It is located to the northwest of Mesopotamia, to the west of Biabou, and to the southwest of Greiggs.
