= Col des Bagenelles =

Mountain pass in the Vosges, France

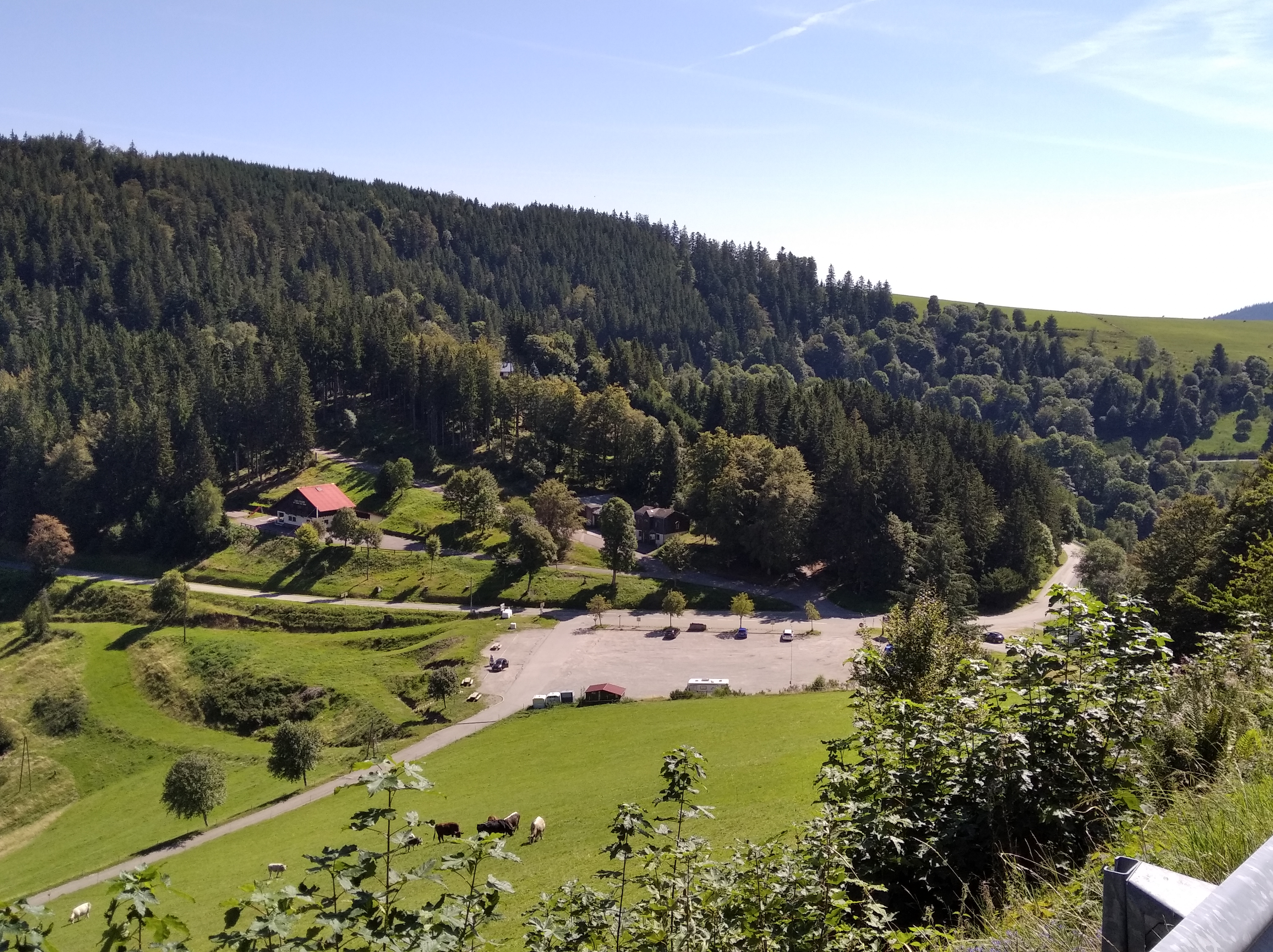
- View of the pass from the D148.

- Location within France
- Elevation: 904 m (2,966 ft)
- Traversed by: D48

Third Approach
- Location: Haut-Rhin, France
- Range: Vosges Mountains
- Coordinates: 48°11′33″N 7°06′50″E

The Col des Bagenelles (French pronunciation: [kɔl de baʒnɛl]) is a mountain pass at an altitude of 904 meters (2,966 ft) in the Vosges.

== Geography ==
The Col des Bagenelles lies at an altitude of 904 metres. The pass offers a panorama of both the Lièpvrette and Béhine valleys. Close to the pass is the Grand Brézouard (1,229 meters (4,032 ft)), a peak between Les Bagenelles, Le Bonhomme, Sainte-Marie-aux-Mines and Aubure.

The pass is a ten-minute drive from Sainte-Marie-aux-Mines on the D48, which passes through the hamlet of Échéry. It descends to Le Bonhomme, 5 km below. A side road, the D 148, joins the Route des Crêtes via the Col du Pré de Raves at 1,009 m.

== Tourism ==
=== Wintersports ===
There are 46 km of cross-country ski trails and four snowshoe itineraries. There's also a small alpine ski area near the Graine Johé farmhouse inn, with three alpine ski runs (one green, one blue, one red) culminating at the summit of the tête des Chats, and two ski lifts.

=== Museum ===
Tellure is a museum and mining park showcasing the Sainte-Marie-aux-Mines and Val d'Argent mines, and a partner in the annual Mineral & Gem event. The Tellure silver mine is the largest manmade cavern in the Vosges mountains, and provides an opportunity to discover the Saint-Jean-Engelsbourg mine, which has been in operation since the 16th century.

== Tour de France ==
The Col des Bagenelles has so far been climbed once in the Tour de France, in 1992 on stage 11 between Strasbourg and Mulhouse. The first to cross the pass was German cyclist Rolf Gölz.
