= Fancy (given name) =

- Gender: Unisex
- Language: English

Origin
- Meaning: Caprice, fantasy

Fancy is a given name in occasional use in the Anglosphere. It is derived from the English vocabulary word fancy, a shortened version of the word fantasy. The word is also used in reference to an unusual, novel idea. The word is also used to describe elaborate ornamentation or an individual preference for a person or object. In some instances the name might be a diminutive of the name Frances. Fancy is also an English surname.

It might refer to:

== Women ==
- Fancy Bermudez (born 2002), Canadian rugby union player
- Fancy Cherono (born 2001), Kenyan track and field athlete
- Fancy Chemutai (born 1995), Kenyan long-distance runner

== Female stage name ==
- My Fancy, stage name of American dancer Mae Rose Bawn (1878–1933)

== Male stage name ==
- Fancy (singer) (born 1946), stage name of German singer, songwriter, and record producer Manfred Segieth
- Fancy Gadam (born 1988), stage name of Ghanaian afropop, dancehall and reggae musician Mujahid Ahmed Bello
- Fancy Hagood (born 1991), stage name of American singer Jake Hagood
- Fancy Ray, stage name of American stand-up comedian and advertising pitchman Ray McCloney

== Fictional characters ==
- Fancy Crane, a character on the American soap opera Passions
