= Col du Bonhomme =

Mountain pass in France

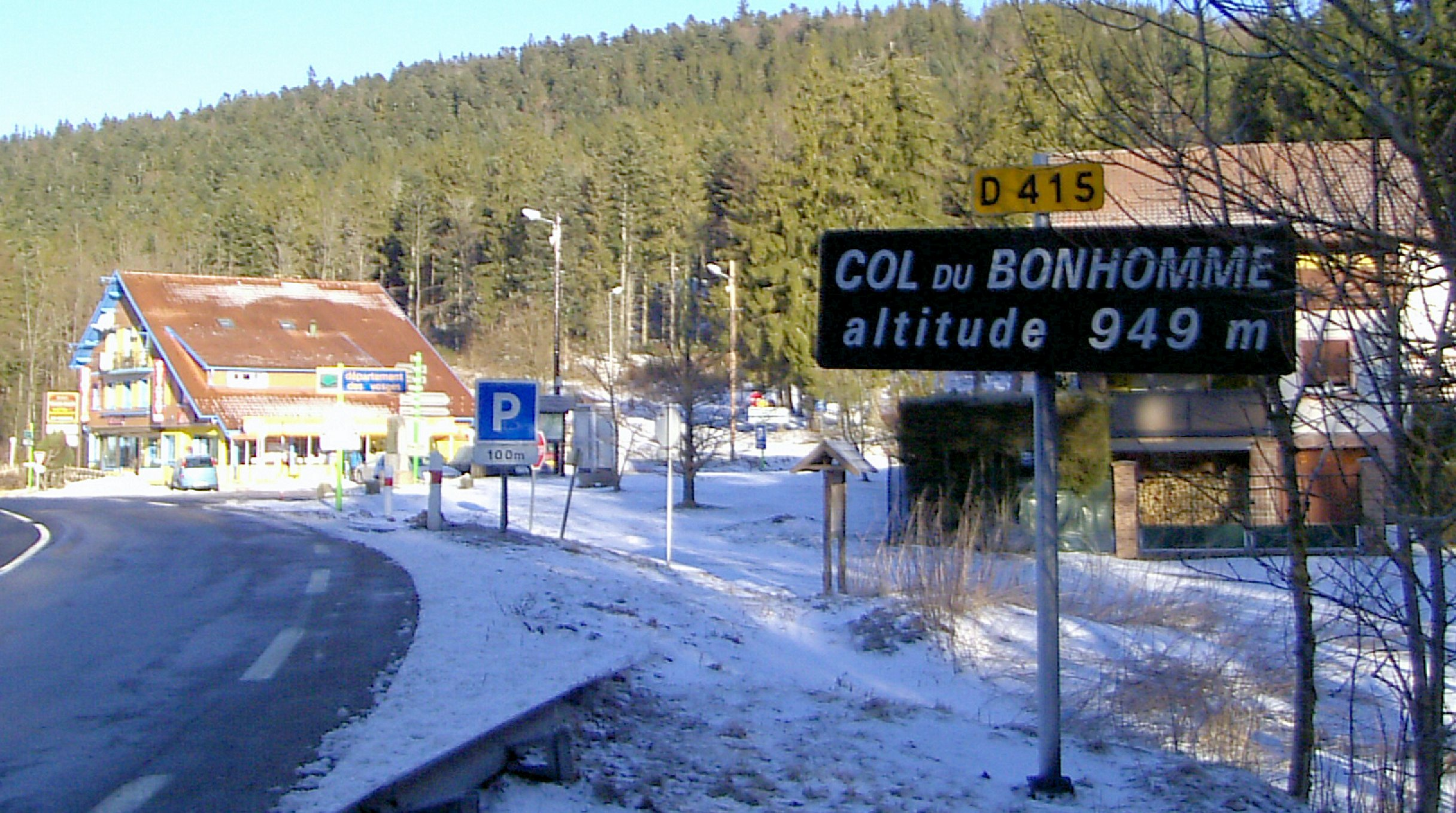
- The Col du Bonhomme in winter (January 2009)

- Location within Alps
- Elevation: 949 metres (3,114 ft)
- Traversed by: D415

Third Approach
- Location: Haut-Rhin / Vosges, France
- Range: Vosges Mountains
- Coordinates: 48°9′53.8″N 7°4′46″E

The Col du Bonhomme (French pronunciation: [kɔl dy bɔ.nɔm]) (elevation 949 m (3,114 ft)) is a mountain pass in the Vosges Mountains of France. The pass connects Kaysersberg (Haut-Rhin) with Saint-Dié-des-Vosges (Vosges) (east–west) and is also crossed by the Route des Crêtes (north–south). The pass takes its name from the nearby village of Le Bonhomme, 6 km to the east.

== History ==
Between 1871 and 1918, the pass was a border crossing between Lorraine (France) and Alsace, which had been ceded to Germany under the Treaty of Frankfurt. A stone marking the former border is situated 100 m south of the pass on D148 (Route des Crêtes).

During World War I, the pass was the scene of fighting between French and German soldiers. On 8 September 1914, the commander of the French 41st Infantry Division, 69-year-old General Bataille, and six of his men were killed in a German artillery attack. A memorial to the General and his men stands at the pass.

== Details of climbs ==
From the east, the climb starts at Ammerschwihr, passing through Kaysersberg and Le Bonhomme en route. From this direction, the total ascent is 22.1 km (13.7 mi) long climbing 714 m (2,343 ft) at an average gradient of 3.2%, with a maximum of 7.4%.

From the west, the climb starts at Saulcy-sur-Meurthe passing through Fraize. This climb is 20.0 km (12.4 mi) long, at an average gradient of 2.8%, climbing 564 m (1,850 ft). The maximum gradient is 6.5%.

The pass can also be reached from Sainte-Marie-aux-Mines via the Route des Crêtes (D48), passing Col des Bagenelles (904 m (2,966 ft)) and Col du Pré de Raves (1,009 m (3,310 ft)) en route, with the highest point reached at 1,062 m (3,484 ft), 3.5 km (2.2 mi) before the Col du Bonhomme. The total distance is 18.4 km (11.4 mi) gaining 589 m (1,932 ft) in height at an average gradient of 3.2%. The central section, the last 7 km (4.3 mi) before the Col du Pré de Raves averages 6.5%.

== Tour de France ==
The climb over the pass has been used in the Tour de France cycle race, the first time being on the penultimate stage of the 1949 tour, an individual mountain time trial won by Fausto Coppi.
