= Greiggs =

- Location in Saint Vincent and the Grenadines
- Coordinates: 13°12′N 061°09′W
- Country: Saint Vincent and the Grenadines
- Island: Saint Vincent
- Parish: Charlotte

Greiggs is a town in eastern inland Saint Vincent, in Saint Vincent and the Grenadines. It is located to the northwest of Biabou and northeast of Richland Park.
