= Colonarie =

- Location in Saint Vincent and the Grenadines
- Coordinates: 13°14′N 061°07′W
- Country: Saint Vincent and the Grenadines
- Island: Saint Vincent
- Parish: Charlotte

Population (2012)
  - Total: 6,849

Colonarie is a town in the east of the island of Saint Vincent in Charlotte Parish, Saint Vincent and the Grenadines. It stands on the banks of the Colonarie River, five kilometres south of Georgetown.

Colonarie Vale was a plantation owned by Walter Conningham in 1829. The plantation was 407 acres in extent.

Ralph Gonsalves, prime minister of Saint Vincent and the Grenadines from 2001 to 2025, and Susan Dougan, Governor-General of Saint Vincent and the Grenadines since 2019, were both born in Colonarie.
