= Fancy, Saint Vincent and the Grenadines =

Fancy
- Location in Saint Vincent and the Grenadines
- Coordinates: 13°22′N 061°10′W
- Country: Saint Vincent and the Grenadines
- Island: Saint Vincent
- Parish: Charlotte

Fancy is the northernmost settlement in both the island of Saint Vincent and in the jurisdiction of Saint Vincent and the Grenadines. It is located in Charlotte Parish, on the coast close to the country's northernmost point. The town of Owia lies to the southeast of Fancy.
