= Byera Village =

- Location in Saint Vincent and the Grenadines
- Coordinates: 13°15′22″N 61°07′10″W
- Country: Saint Vincent and the Grenadines
- Island: Saint Vincent
- Parish: Charlotte

Byera Village is a historic settlement in Saint Vincent and the Grenadines.It is located in Charlotte Parish. It has a population over 4,000 residents is considered being one of the country's largest settlemenst. During the colonial period it served as a boundary between the local natives and the white planters in the parish. It was settled by the free slaves after emancipation. Many of older residents migrated from Barbados and Trinidad.
