= Caratal River =

Coordinates: 13°16′N 61°06′W

Location
- Country: Saint Vincent and the Grenadines

The Caratal River is a river of Saint Vincent and the Grenadines.

== See also ==
- List of rivers of Saint Vincent and the Grenadines
