= Peruvian Vale =

- Location in Saint Vincent and the Grenadines
- Coordinates: 13°10′37″N 061°08′45″W
- Country: Saint Vincent and the Grenadines
- Island: Saint Vincent
- Parish: Charlotte

Peruvian Vale is a village in southeastern Saint Vincent, in Saint Vincent and the Grenadines. It is located to the east of the capital, Kingstown, at the northern end of Argyle Beach. Peruvian Vale lies on the coast road linking the capital with Georgetown, Saint Vincent and the Grenadines in the island's northeast. Peruvian Vale lies to the north of Stubbs, and south of Adelphi and Biabou.
