= Bonhomme Township, St. Louis County, Missouri =

Township in St. Louis County, Missouri, U.S.

Coordinates: 38°34′20″N 90°25′4″W

Bonhomme Township is a township in St. Louis County, in the U.S. state of Missouri. Its population was 36,316 as of the 2010 census.

Bonhomme Township takes its name from Bonhomme Creek.
