= New Sandy Bay Village =

- Village
- Location in Saint Vincent and the Grenadines
- Coordinates: 13°21′08″N 061°07′53″W
- Country: Saint Vincent and the Grenadines
- Island: Saint Vincent
- Parish: Charlotte
- Elevation: 62 ft (19 m)
- Time zone: UTC-4 (Eastern Caribbean Time Zone (ECT))

New Sandy Bay Village is a village in Charlotte Parish, Saint Vincent and the Grenadines. The village is located on the north shore of the island of Saint Vincent at only 62 feet above sea level.

== See also ==
- Charlotte Parish
