= Shackell Bobb =

Vincentian lawyer

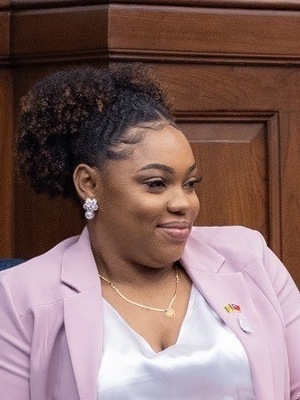

Shackell Bobb is a Vincentian lawyer serving as senator and parliamentarian secretary since 2023.

== Career ==
Bobb is a lawyer from Mesopotamia, Saint Vincent and the Grenadines. In July 2023, she was appointed by prime minister Ralph Gonsalves as a senator and parliamentarian secretary. She succeeded Rochard Karim Ballah and is the youngest member of the cabinet of Saint Vincent and the Grenadines.
