= Rabacca Dry River =

River in Saint Vincent and the Grenadines

Coordinates: 13°17′N 61°07′W

Rabacca Dry
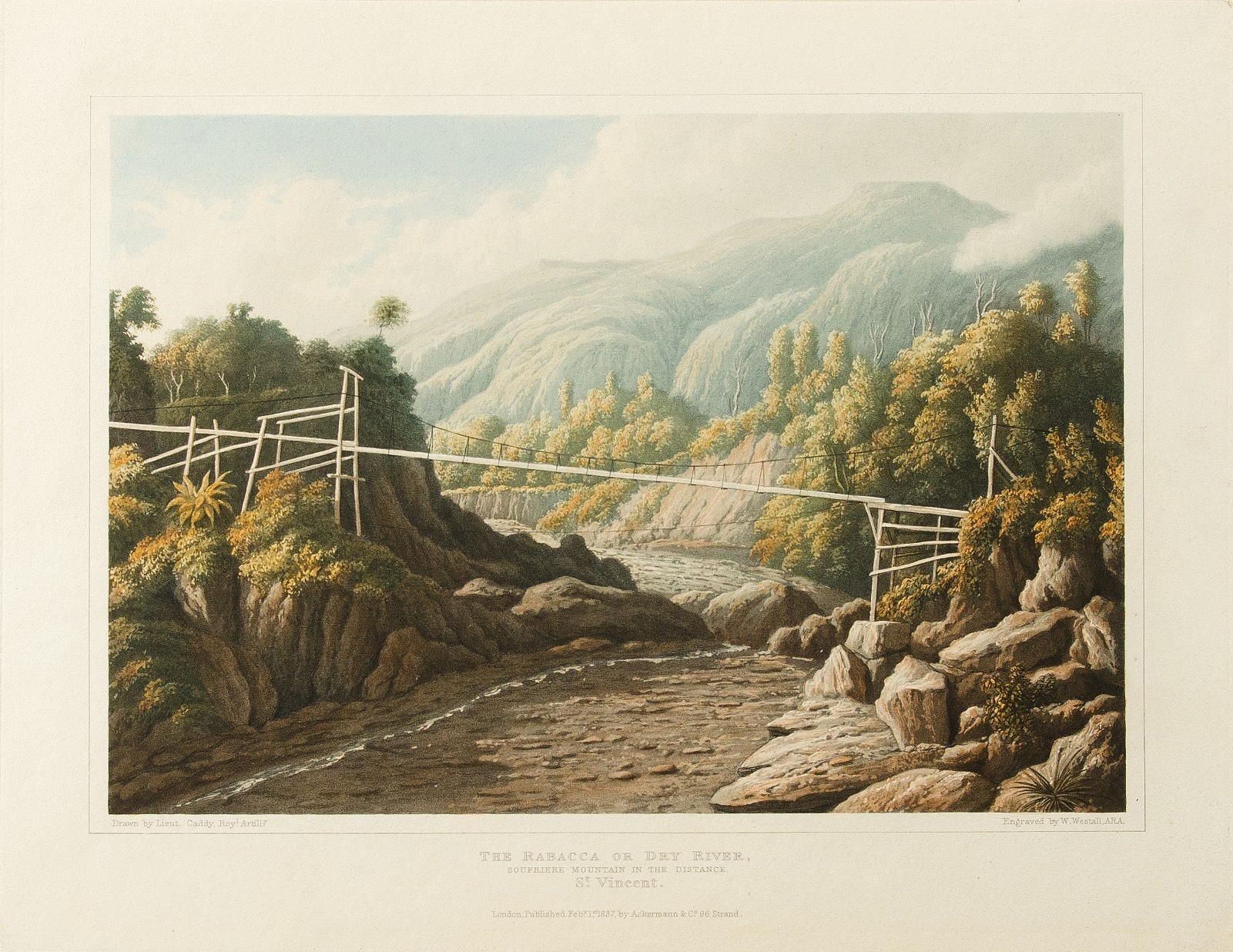
- The Rabacca or Dry River, Soufriere Mountain in the distance. Painted ca. 1836
- Nickname: Dry River

Location
- Country: Saint Vincent and the Grenadines
- Region: Charlotte

Physical characteristics
- Source: La Soufrière
  - elevation: 4,048 m (13,281 ft)
- Mouth: Rabacca
  - location: Atlantic Ocean
  - coordinates
  - elevation: 0 m (0 ft)
- Length: 8 km (5.0 mi)

The Rabacca Dry River is a river of Saint Vincent and the Grenadines. It is a seasonal river and will only flow like a normal when there is heavy rainfall. It is located on the outskirts of Georgetown. It was formed as a result of the eruption of the La Soufriere volcano, there is its source.

== See also ==
- List of rivers of Saint Vincent and the Grenadines
