= Brézouard =

Peak in the Vosges Mountains

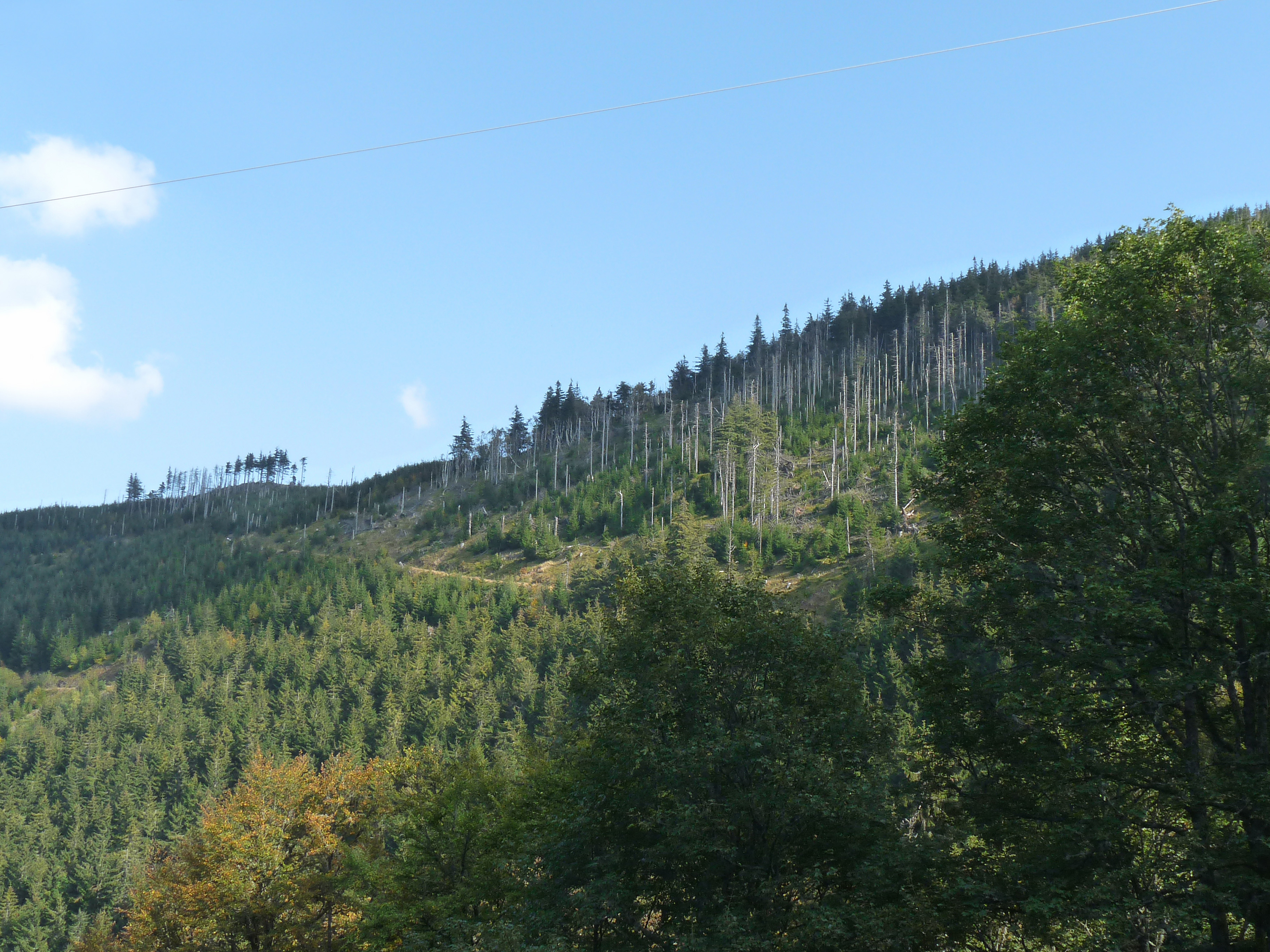
- View of the Petit Brézouard on the left and the Grand Brézouard on the right.

Highest point
- Elevation: 1,229 m (4,032 ft)
- Coordinates: 48°11′22″N 7°09′00″E

Geography
- Location within France
- Location: Alsace, France
- Parent range: Vosges Mountains

The Brézouard (French pronunciation: [bʁezwaʁ]) is a summit in the Vosges Mountains, part of the canton of Lapoutroie. It is located eight kilometers from Sainte-Marie-aux-Mines, which can be reached by taking the small Échéry road.

== Toponymy ==
The residents of Sainte-Marie-aux-Mines prefer to call the summit of Brézouard by the name Brüschbückel, which means "the mountain covered with heather." On old maps, Brézouard may still appear under the name Bressoir.

== Geography ==
=== Situation ===
From Échéry, the two banks of the Lièpvrette converge. More than half of its surface area belongs to Sainte-Marie-aux-Mines, with the remaining part belonging to the commune of Fréland. The Grand Brézouard, formerly known as the Ballon de Sainte-Marie-aux-Mines, reaches an altitude of 1,229 meters. The Petit Brézouard, its twin 400 meters to the northeast, only reaches an altitude of 1,203 meters.

=== Geology ===
The summit of the Brézouard is composed of two-mica granite.

== See also ==
- Vosges Mountains
