= Portland sheep =

Breed of sheep

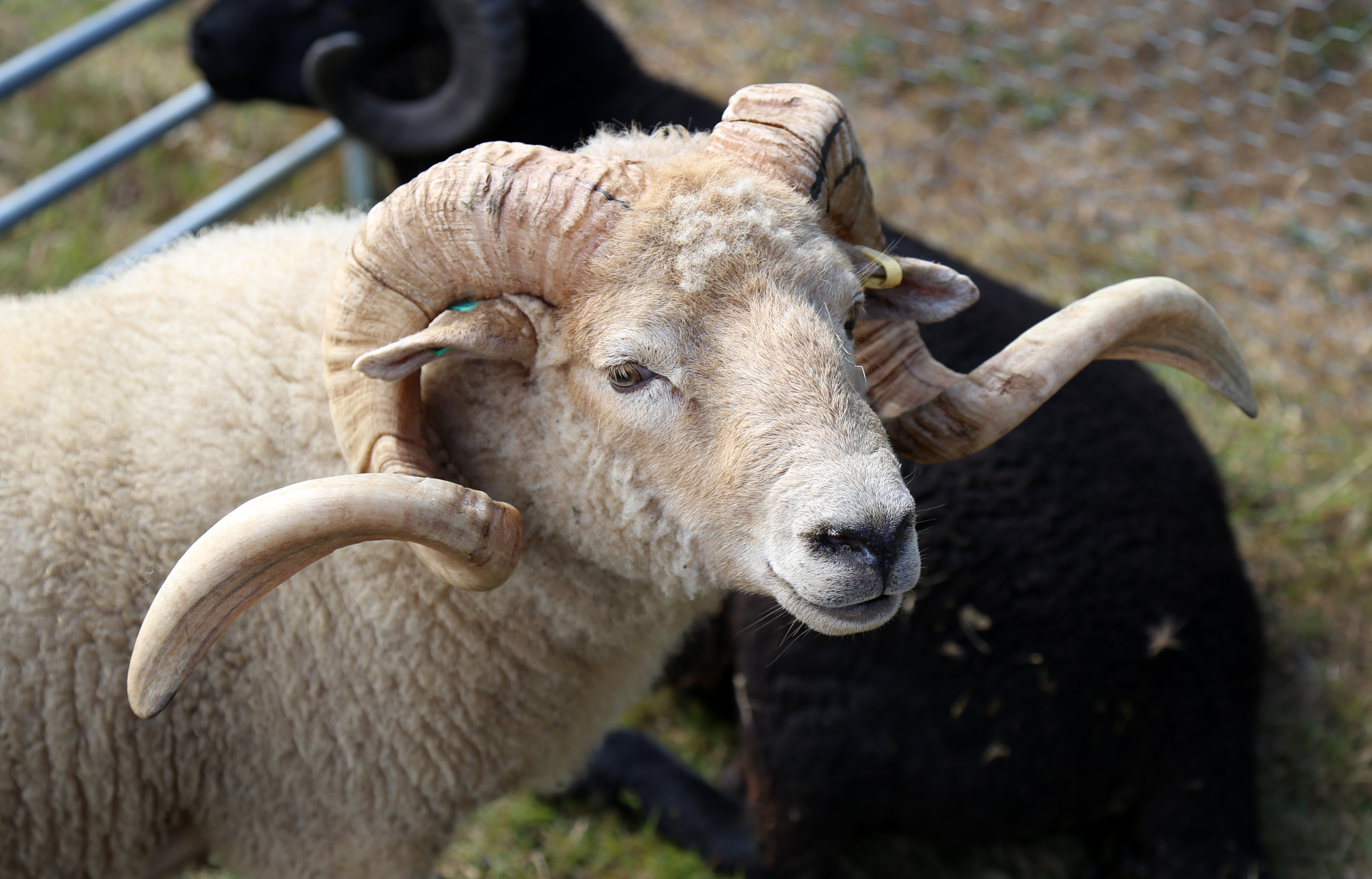
A Portland ram at Shipley, West Sussex, England

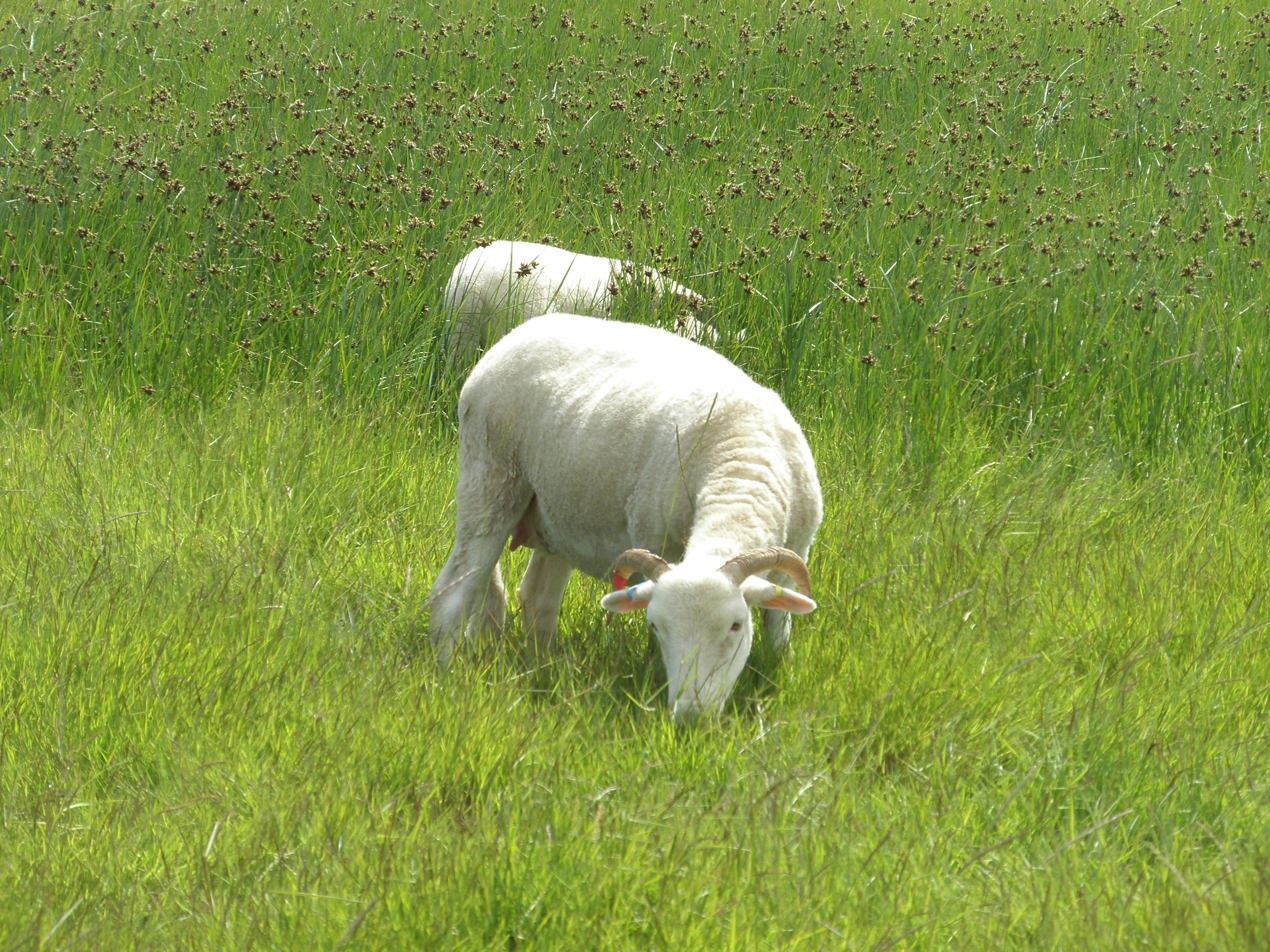
A Portland sheep in Orford Ness, Suffolk

The Portland is a sheep breed that takes its name from the Isle of Portland in Dorset, England. This breed is raised primarily for meat.

== History ==
Once common all over Dorset, the breed was once one of the rarest in Britain and is still at risk. It nearly became extinct in the 1970s, but has now recovered through efforts of dedicated breeders and the help of the Rare Breeds Survival Trust. It is now listed as "at risk", being a minority breed. As one of the very old tan-faced breeds native to heathlands, the Portland was a primary contributor to the Dorset breed.

Fancy's Family Farm, a community farm on the Isle of Portland is home to the only flock of the Portland sheep breed on the island.

== Characteristics ==
The Portland is a small sheep, with a cream fleece and golden tan face and legs. Both sexes are horned: in the adult male the horns are heavy and form double spirals; in the female the horns are lighter and shorter, being a single crescent shape. The horns are cream-coloured, often having one or more thin black lines running along the horn lengthways. Lambs are born with a foxy-red coat which changes in the first few months to a creamy white.

The face is generally free of wool, but some sheep have a top knot of short wool. A distinctive feature is that they tend to have paler patches around the eyes, referred to as 'spectacles'. Both sexes have a broad muzzle, which is usually as pale as the 'spectacles'. Ewes tend to have a dished face, rather than a Roman nose. The nose is usually black.

In adult sheep the front legs and the rear legs below the hocks are free of wool. The feet are mainly black. The meat has a more complex flavour than most commercial breeds, highly prized since the time of George III. They produce 2–3 kg. of 50's–60's down-quality wool with a staple length of 6–9 cm (2.5–3.5 in), which is suitable for hosiery and hand-knitting yarns.

This breed will sometimes breed out of season, and was the first breed of sheep in Britain able to have lambs at any time of the year.

== See also ==
- Cuisine of Dorset
