= Rutland River =

Location
- Country: Saint Vincent and the Grenadines

The Rutland River is a river of Saint Vincent and the Grenadines.

== See also ==
- List of rivers of Saint Vincent and the Grenadines
