= Higher Lowmans =

Village in Saint Vincent, Saint Vincent and the Grenadines

- Country: Saint Vincent and the Grenadines
- Island: Saint Vincent
- Parish: Charlotte

Population (2012)
  - Total: 760

Higher Lowmans is a village in Charlotte Parish, Saint Vincent and the Grenadines. In 2012, the village had a population of 760 in two enumeration districts. It is located near Bridgetown. 94.47% of the population was African descendant, 4.88% were mixed, and 0.66% were indigenous. All of the population lived in rural areas. Most of the population were Christians, although there is a significant irreligious minority at about 14%.
