= Owia =

- Location in Saint Vincent and the Grenadines
- Coordinates: 13.3753°N 61.1436°W
- Country: Saint Vincent and the Grenadines
- Island: Saint Vincent
- Parish: Charlotte

Owia is a town in Saint Vincent and the Grenadines. It is located in the northeast of the main island of Saint Vincent, close to the nation's northernmost point, Porter Point.
