= Colonarie River =

River on the Caribbean island of Saint Vincent

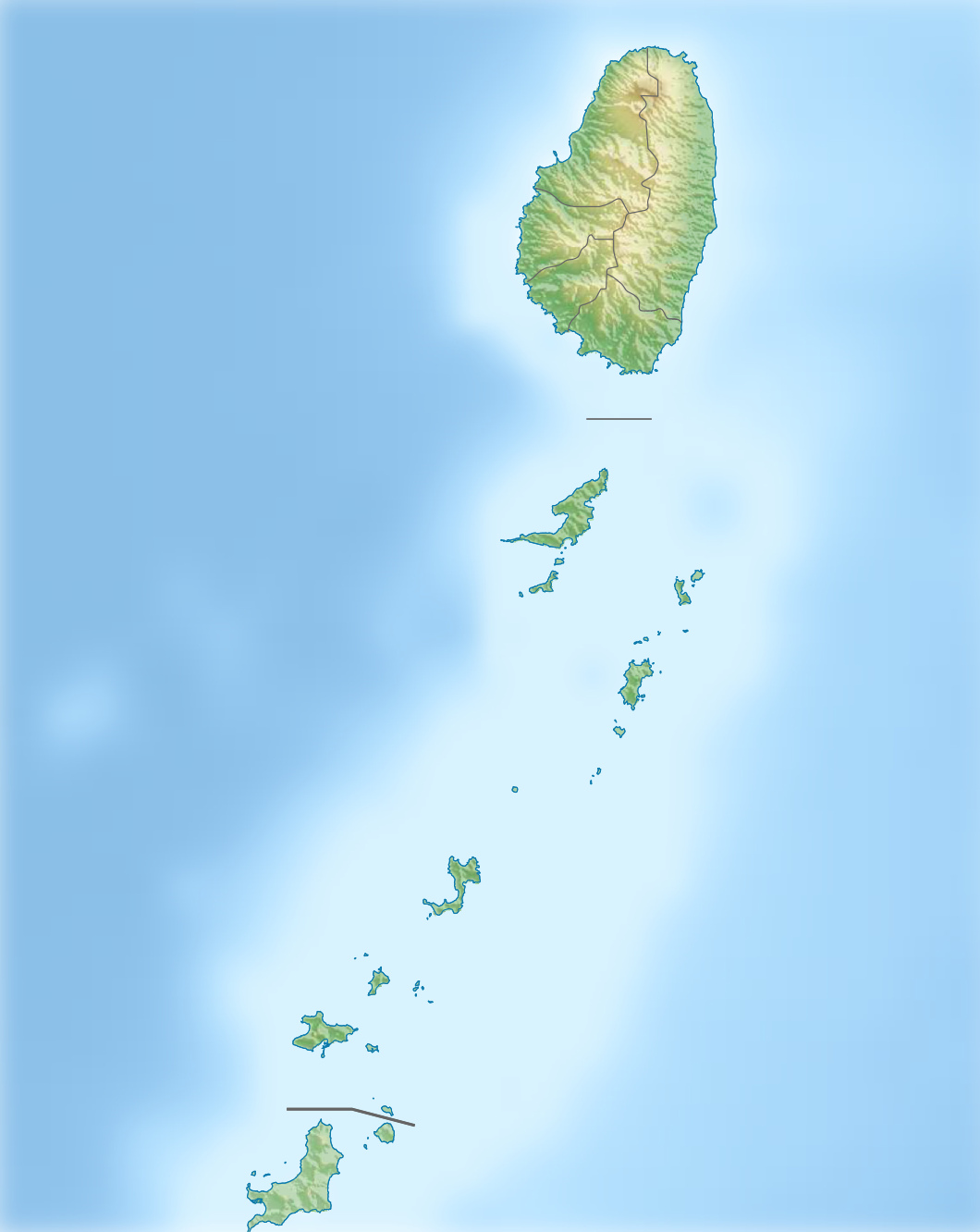
- Location within Saint Vincent and the Grenadines

Location
- Country: Saint Vincent and the Grenadines

Physical characteristics
- Mouth
  - coordinates: 13°14′N 61°07′W
- Length: 8 km (5.0 mi)

The Colonarie River is the longest river in Saint Vincent and the Grenadines. Located on the main island of Saint Vincent, it flows from the north-eastern slopes of Grand Bonhomme peak in a north-easterly direction, turning east before flowing into the Atlantic Ocean on the island's central east coast. The town of Colonarie is located on the banks of the river.

== Important Bird Area ==
A 1,590 ha site encompassing the middle and upper reaches of the Colonarie’s watershed has been designated an Important Bird Area (IBA) by BirdLife International because it supports significant populations of lesser Antillean swifts, purple and green-throated caribs, Antillean crested hummingbirds, Saint Vincent amazons, Caribbean elaenias, Grenada flycatchers, scaly-breasted thrashers, brown tremblers, rufous-throated solitaires, lesser Antillean euphonias, whistling warblers, Saint Vincent tanagers and lesser Antillean bullfinches.
