= Mesopotamia, Saint Vincent and the Grenadines =

Mesopotamia
- Location in Saint Vincent and the Grenadines
- Coordinates: 13°10′N 061°10′W
- Country: Saint Vincent and the Grenadines
- Island: Saint Vincent
- Parish: Saint George

Mesopotamia is a town in eastern inland Saint Vincent, in Saint Vincent and the Grenadines. It is located to the southeast of Richland Park, and to the west of Peruvian Vale.

== Notable people ==
- Shackell Bobb, lawyer and politician
- Girlyn Miguel (born 1948), former MP and Deputy Prime Minister Phillip Jackson New MP with the NDP. He is the Minister of Education
