= Greathead River =

Coordinates: 13°08′N 61°13′W

Location
- Country: Saint Vincent and the Grenadines

The Greathead River is a river of Saint Vincent and the Grenadines.

== See also ==
- List of rivers of Saint Vincent and the Grenadines
