= Bonhomme Richard =

Bonhomme Richard or Bon Homme Richard, meaning good man Richard in French, may refer to:

- USS Bonhomme Richard, several ships of the United States.
- Les Maximes du Bonhomme Richard, the French title of Poor Richard's Almanack, for which the ships were named.
- A pseudonym of Benjamin Franklin

== See also ==
- Bonhomme (disambiguation)
- Richard
