= Yambou River =

Location
- Country: Saint Vincent and the Grenadines

The Yambou River is a river of Saint Vincent and the Grenadines. It is located in the valley of Yambou and is one of the main rivers of the island.

== See also ==
- List of rivers of Saint Vincent and the Grenadines
