= Cuisine of Dorset =

Local cuisine

The cuisine of Dorset, a county in South West England, is characterised by a variety of, often simple, dishes which are sourced, or have traditionally been sourced, from the county itself. Today, the cuisine of Dorset reflects the wider shift towards organic and local produce. These principles are upheld by farmers' markets, farm shops and fairs held across Dorset.

Many of the traditional dishes originate from the 17th and 18th centuries. At this time, much of the workforce were employed as agricultural labourers and, though they produced most of the food, their diet was poor. The gentry, unique in being able to shop for produce, and farmers, fared better. Despite this, until the early 19th century at least, simple foods, such as bread, comprised a sizeable part of the diet of all classes.

== History ==
=== Middle Ages ===
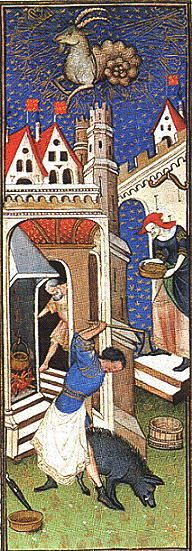
Dorset's poor would have mostly eaten pigs as their meat in medieval times, as they were easy to rear.

A rural county, Dorset would have been typical of England in the Middle Ages, and its population would have eaten similarly to the rest of the country. Bread was the staple food, and it came in two main categories: white and "other breads". White breads were the finest quality breads and would have been made using wheat and then well-sifted flour; "other breads" were a mixture of breads which also contained wheat (though the flour would not have been sifted as much), husk and other grains. The most commonly eaten bread, called maslin, was of the "other" category and contained wheat and rye.

Seafood and fish were important, not least because they could be eaten during Lent and Fridays, unlike meat. Red meats were preferable to white meats, and amongst the former beef was the most favoured. Pigs were eaten primarily by the poor, especially during winter, because of their ease in rearing. Poultry was widely enjoyed, particularly by the clergy, who were permitted to eat "two-legged" but not "four-legged" meat.

=== 17th and 18th centuries ===
While some of the recipes which comprise the traditional cuisine of Dorset originate from the Middle Ages, the majority come from the 17th and 18th centuries. Within the sources in which recipes are recorded (recipe books, diaries), there is considerable bias towards the cooking habits of gentry, even in those of 17th- and 18th-century origin; the upper classes of society were more literate and able to purchase the variety of ingredients which would necessitate a cookery book. Although labourers and their families were the largest section of the population in Dorset (even after mechanisation in the middle of the 19th century), their low wages could not facilitate elaborate cooking and there was widespread illiteracy. Information on the dietary habits of the working class during the 17th and 18th centuries is usually gained incidentally, such as in reports on the state of the poor in the county.

One of the earliest detailed reports on the diet of a Dorset labourer, by Sir Frederick Eden in 1795, describes an impoverished position:

The usual breakfast of the family is tea, or bread and cheese, their dinner and supper, bread and cheese, or potatoes sometimes mashed with fat taken from broth, and sometimes salt alone. Bullock's cheek is generally bought every week to make broth. Treacle is used to sweeten tea instead of sugar.

Such a situation continued until at least as late as 1868, when an inquiry was held into the food of the labourers. In fact, prior to the introduction of the potato, the diet of the labourers had been less favourable; in 1869, one investigator noted that before this: "the labourers had very little beside bread and cheese and water". As recorded by John Bright in 1844, many families in the county managed on 10 shillings per week, of which at least half was spent on bread. Despite this, reports of the 18th and 19th century accuse "the poor" of being wasteful: "making cakes without yeast, and broiling or baking them on a gridiron, by which means it is said the quantity is lessened."

Whilst food in a workhouse was considered the worst possible in the county, no one starved inside and people did outside. Though the instructions of the Poor Law Commissioner were to prevent the diet of the workhouse residents from being "superior or equal to the ordinary mode of subsistence of the labouring classes", in 1844 it was complained that "the diet [of our Union] at the present time, [is] somewhat superior to that obtainable by many Independent Labourers". However, while the food provided in a workhouse was adequate, it was plain and lacked fruit and vegetables.

At the higher end of the county's cuisine was food cooked and prepared in the farmhouses ("farmhouse food"), seen as the home of traditional cooking in the 19th century. A far greater variety of ingredients were available for cooking, and, by the 18th century, ovens could be found in many farmhouses. Playwright John O'Keeffe described his lunch in 1791 at the Red Lion Inn at West Lulworth, which had its own farm, as:

Roast loin of lamb, delicate boiled chickens, green-peas, young potatoes, a gooseberry pie, thick cream, good strong home-brewed ale, and a glass of tolerable port wine.

It might be expected that when King George III spent his summer holidays in Weymouth, as he did often between 1789 and 1805, the height of cuisine would accompany him. However, by this time suffering from illness, the King ate plainly. Among his favourite foods from the area were Radipole biscuits, pudding at the Portland Arms (which came to be known as "Royal Pudding"), and Portland sheep (also "Portland mutton").

== Notes ==
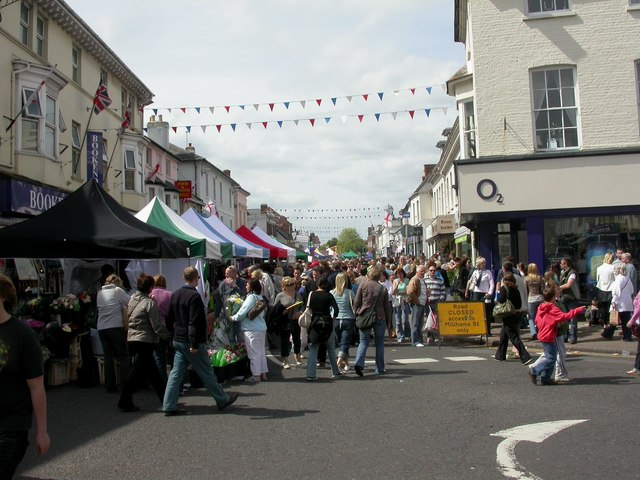
Christchurch Food and Wine Festival

== Bibliography ==
- Peter Brears, Maggie Black (1985). Food and cooking in medieval Britain : history and recipes. London: Historic Buildings and Monuments Commission for England. ISBN 1-85074-081-X.
- Draper, Jo (2007). Dorset Food (New ed.). Stroud: Sutton. ISBN 978-0-7509-4458-8.
- Neesam, Michael Feasey; photography, Brian (2005). Eat Dorset. Beaminster: Parnham. ISBN 0-9550712-0-8.
- Mason, Laura; Catherine Brown (2007). From Bath Chaps to Bara Brith - The Taste of South West Britain. London: Harper Press. ISBN 978-0-00-779842-1.
