= Col du Pré de Raves =

Mountain pass in France

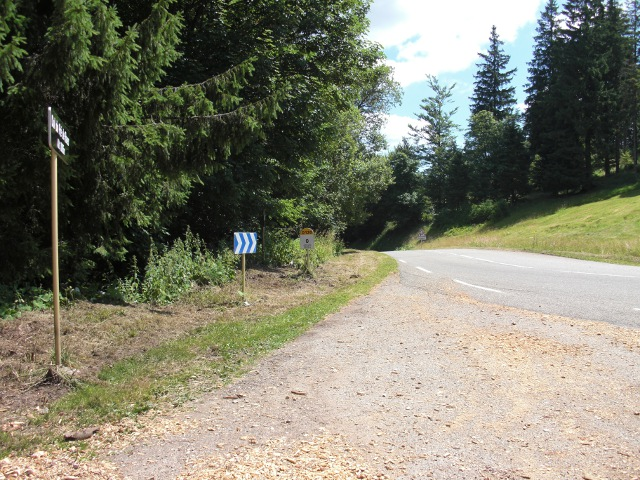

- Location within Alps
- Elevation: 1,009 metres (3,310 ft)
- Traversed by: D148

Third Approach
- Location: Haut-Rhin / Vosges, France
- Range: Vosges Mountains
- Coordinates: 48°11′58″N 7°06′25″E

The Col du Pré de Raves (French pronunciation: [kɔl dy pʁe də ʁav]) is a secondary mountain pass in the Vosges Massif. It is a crossing point on the Route des Crêtes (D 148).

== Toponymy ==
Raves originates from the term "rava," which refers to the confluence of two streams or the place where multiple watercourses meet.

== Geography ==
Located on the edge of the Croix-aux-Mines state forest, the pass is accessible via the Departmental Road 148, which connects the Col des Bagenelles to the Vosges department after the Col du Calvaire, or by taking the Jean-François Pelet road leading to the forest road of Pré des Raves from the Col de Mandray.

== History ==
In the 19th century, the Pré de Raves was used for agro-pastoral purposes. Its landscape featured a farmhouse surrounded by a meadow 200 meters wide and about 2 kilometers long. The flora included arnica, thyme, and Meum. This vegetation disappeared following reforestation with conifers after the inn was rented to the scouts of Saint-Dié and subsequently destroyed.

It was the scene of fierce fighting at the beginning of the First World War.
