= Sainte-Marie-aux-Mines =

Commune in Grand Est, France

- Commune
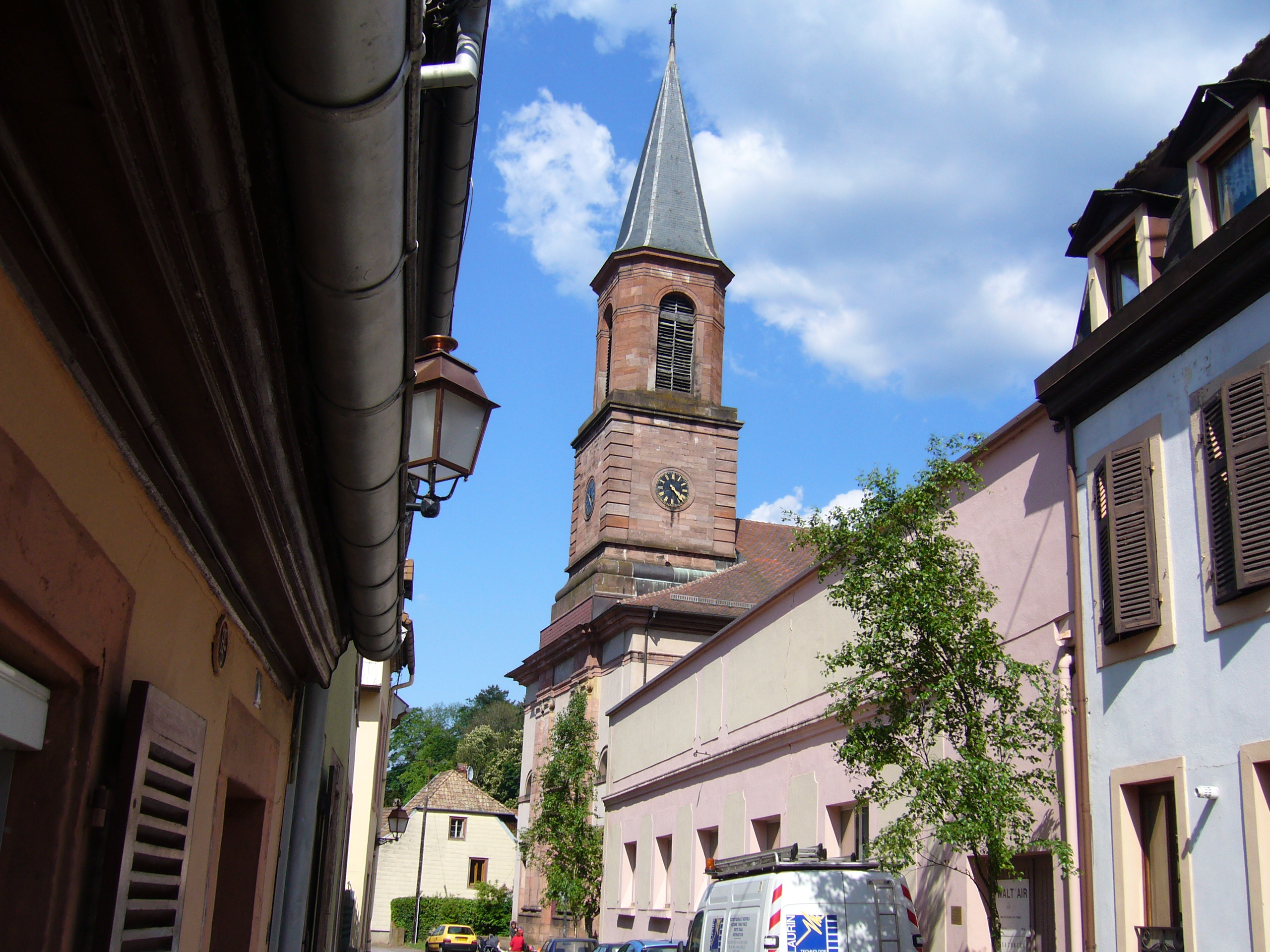
- Church of Saint Louis

- Coat of arms
- Location of Sainte-Marie-aux-Mines
- Location within France Location within Grand Est
- Coordinates: 48°15′N 7°11′E
- Country: France
- Region: Grand Est
- Department: Haut-Rhin
- Arrondissement: Colmar-Ribeauvillé
- Canton: Sainte-Marie-aux-Mines
- Intercommunality: CC du Val d'Argent

Government
  - Mayor (2021–2026): Noëllie Hestin
- Area^{1}: 45.23 km^{2} (17.46 sq mi)
- Elevation: 375 m (1,230 ft)
- Highest elevation: 1,210 m (3,970 ft)
- Lowest elevation: 326 m (1,070 ft)
- Population (2023): 4,851
  - Density: 107.3/km^{2} (277.8/sq mi)
- Time zone: UTC+01:00 (CET)
  - Summer (DST): UTC+02:00 (CEST)
- INSEE/Postal code: 68298 /68160
- ^{1} French Land Register data, which excludes lakes, ponds, glaciers > 1 km^{2} (0.386 sq mi or 247 acres) and river estuaries.

Sainte-Marie-aux-Mines (French pronunciation: [sɛ̃t maʁi o min]; German: Markirch; Alsatian: Màrkìrisch) is a commune in the Haut-Rhin department and Grand Est region of France.

== Geography ==
Sainte-Marie-aux-Mines is located in the massif of the Vosges Mountains, where it occupies the V-shaped valley of the Lièpvrette River. Nearby Lorraine is accessible by road over the Col de Sainte-Marie (772 metres; 2,533 ft) or the Tunnel Maurice-Lemaire (reopened, following a major upgrade, in October 2008). The Col des Bagenelles (904 meters; 2,966 ft) leads to the Col du Bonhomme and to the Route des Crêtes (Road of the Ridges).

The Col du Haut de Ribeauvillé (742 metres; 2,434 ft) gives direct access to Ribeauvillé, situated 20 km (12 mi) to the southeast. Sélestat in the Bas Rhin, a much more substantial commercial and political focus for the region, is just 26 km (16 mi) to the east, along the Liepvrette valley.

Sainte-Marie-aux-Mines is surrounded on both sides of the valley by high mountains. The Lièpvrette River (German:Landbach), separates the town into two parts, and, formerly, into two different parishes.

Some 23 km (14 mi) to the east lies Sélestat at the intersection of the D48, D416, and D459 roads, the first of which crosses the Col des Bagenelles mountain pass.

Early Latin documents called the town Fanum S. Mariae or S. Maria ad Fodinas. Its German-language name was Markirch or Mariakirch. In year II of the Republic, it was given the name of Val-aux-Mines.

The valley of Sainte-Marie-aux-Mines is sometimes called the Val d'Argent. It contains five municipalities: Aubure, Lièpvre, Rombach-le-Franc, and Sainte-Croix-aux-Mines. Established in 1790, it was subdivided temporarily, between 1795 and 1802, into two: the one restricted to the town of Sainte-Marie-aux-Mines, and the other one including the four other municipalities with its center at Sainte-Croix-aux-Mines.

The valley of Sainte-Marie-aux-Mines was a part of the district of Colmar, but in 1871 it became part of the district of Ribeauvillé.

According to the Köppen climate classification, the climate of Sainte-Marie-aux-Mines is oceanic (Cfb), bordering a humid continental climate (Dfb).

=== Localities within the commune ===
Adelspach, Altenberg, Bourgonde, Brifosse, Clésio, la Côte d'Échéry, Échéry, Faunoux, Fenarupt, Fertrupt (Fordelbach), Haut de Faîte, la Haute Broque, le Haycot, Hergauchamps, Mongoutte, la Petite Lièpvre (Kleinleberau), le Petit Haut, le Rauenthal (le Fond-nu), Saint-Philippe, Saint-Pierre sur l'Hâte, Surlattes (Zillhardt).

== Population ==
Historical population
Year	Pop.	±% p.a.
1968	7,417	—
1975	6,703	−1.44%
1982	6,358	−0.75%
1990	5,767	−1.21%
1999	5,816	+0.09%
2007	5,570	−0.54%
2012	5,290	−1.03%
2017	5,095	−0.75%
2023	4,851	−0.81%
Source: INSEE

== Saint Marie-aux-Mines's coats of arms ==
In Louis XIV's "Armorial de la Généralité d’Alsace", Sainte-Marie-aux-Mines's coat of arms is described as: a blue field with a silver-colored representation of Our Lady putting her feet on a golden mountain. The current coats of arms granted on 28 July 1892 can be described as follows: dexter (heraldric right) the arms of Ribeaupierre (a silver field with three red shields), sinister (heraldric left) the arms of Lorraine (a gold field with a red band containing three silver eagles), with both surmounted by a central shield bearing the miners' symbol (a black field bearing two crossed silver-colored mining hammers). These arms evoke both the geographic and political situation of the town prior to the French Revolution and the mining industry for which it was famous. The town is a holder of the Croix de Guerre 1914–1918 with palm (citation by order of the Army of November 2, 1921) and of the Croix de guerre 1939–1945 with vermeil star (citation by order of the armed force).

== History ==
Sainte-Marie-aux-Mines owes its fame to its mines. All the evolution is so conditioned in the exploitation of mines. These mines would have been discovered with Gallo-Romans which had already begun the exploitation of mines at the beginning of the 2nd or 3rd century CE. This hypothesis had been suggested, but was very fast abandoned for lack of serious documents. Robert Forrer put handed her in value in 1927 by basing itself on the presence of antimony in the currencies of and the valley of Lièpvre of which depended more or less, antimony, which according to him, could come only of Sainte-Marie-aux-Mines's region, which would have so known mines from this time. It is then the black hole until the 10th century when according to the monk of the abbey of whom lived in the 13th century, a named monk Blidulphe based Echéry's convent, situated right by the current Sainte-Marie-aux-Mines. The monks noticed soon that the valley abounded in mine fertility. The monks of Echéry are soon threatened in their possessions and their rights by the family of Echery which builds in the 13th century, the castle of Hoh-Eckerich. This family eventually monopolized the mines which the monks exploited.

The first mention of the town dates from the time of Theodoric II, Duke of Lorraine, who returned in 1078 to Lièpvre's convent Sainte-Marie-aux-Mines's tithes and that of the Saint Blaise's nearby village. These possessions made left for Lièpvre's convent which had been deprived of him in 1052 by Gérard d'Alsace, his father. Gérard d'Alsace descended from the family who reigned over Alsace in the 7th century, the name of which is connected with that of Etichon which was also the father of Sainte Odile. The predecessor of Gérard d'Alsace, Adalbert, was the son of another Gérard who had married Gisèle, niece of the emperor. The new hereditary Duke of Lorraine, Gérard d'Alsace, belonged so to an illustrious lineage solidly provided in Alsace, that is in the southwest of the realm of Germania. Links between the Lorraine, realm of Germania and Holy Empire became close. It was supported by the emperor Henry III because Etichonides had always served loyally Empire and had supplied him the devoted civil servants. It is very likely that Gérard d' Alsace had knowledge of the rich mines of the Valley of Lièpvre, because according to Schoepflin it is question from 963 of the time of Gérard, bishop of Toul (963–994) of the silvermines of the Valley of Lièpvre fame of which exceeded Lorraine. In this time it is already question of the tithe which have to pay the monks of the Valley of Lièpvre. The bishop Gérard bishop of Toul named in 963 will be canonized in 1051 by whom was his 5th successor on the seat of Toul's bishop's palace under the name of Léon de Dabo. In the collection Evangelienbuch, poem in popular language finished towards 865 and dedicated to Louis the German, Wissembourg's Otfrid praises the country of Franks, for which he praises, in four towards, the mineralogical wealth of the region vosgienne. Monk of Wissembourg, convent is which possesses properties to the south of the former duchy, not far from Sélestat, and appears to have shown for this region a very deep interest. (1048–1070), Duke of Lorraine from 1048 and nephew of (1047–1048) appears he so disturbed with these mines which are on the lands of his ancestors, Etichonides. In 1055, this duke frees Saint-Dié's abbey of the custody of the bishops of Toul and proclaims himself dedicated with this abbey. It charges dearly this protection. So the chapter loses gradually its rights to preserve only a moral and spiritual authority. Sainte-Marie-aux-Mines, levy in Latin Sancte Maria ad Fodinas, and in German Markirch, owes her name and her origin to exploitation of mines and to the church of Sainte Marie Madeleine who was the parish of the part of Lorraine and who was built in 1757. The big altar was under the invocation of this saint and the two others collateral under the invocation of the Virgin Mary and other one of Holy Sébastien. The town of Saint Marie-aux-Mines is mentioned for the first time in 1317.

Eddie Slovik, the only U.S. soldier of World War II to be executed for desertion, suffered the fate by firing squad near the town on 31 January 1945.

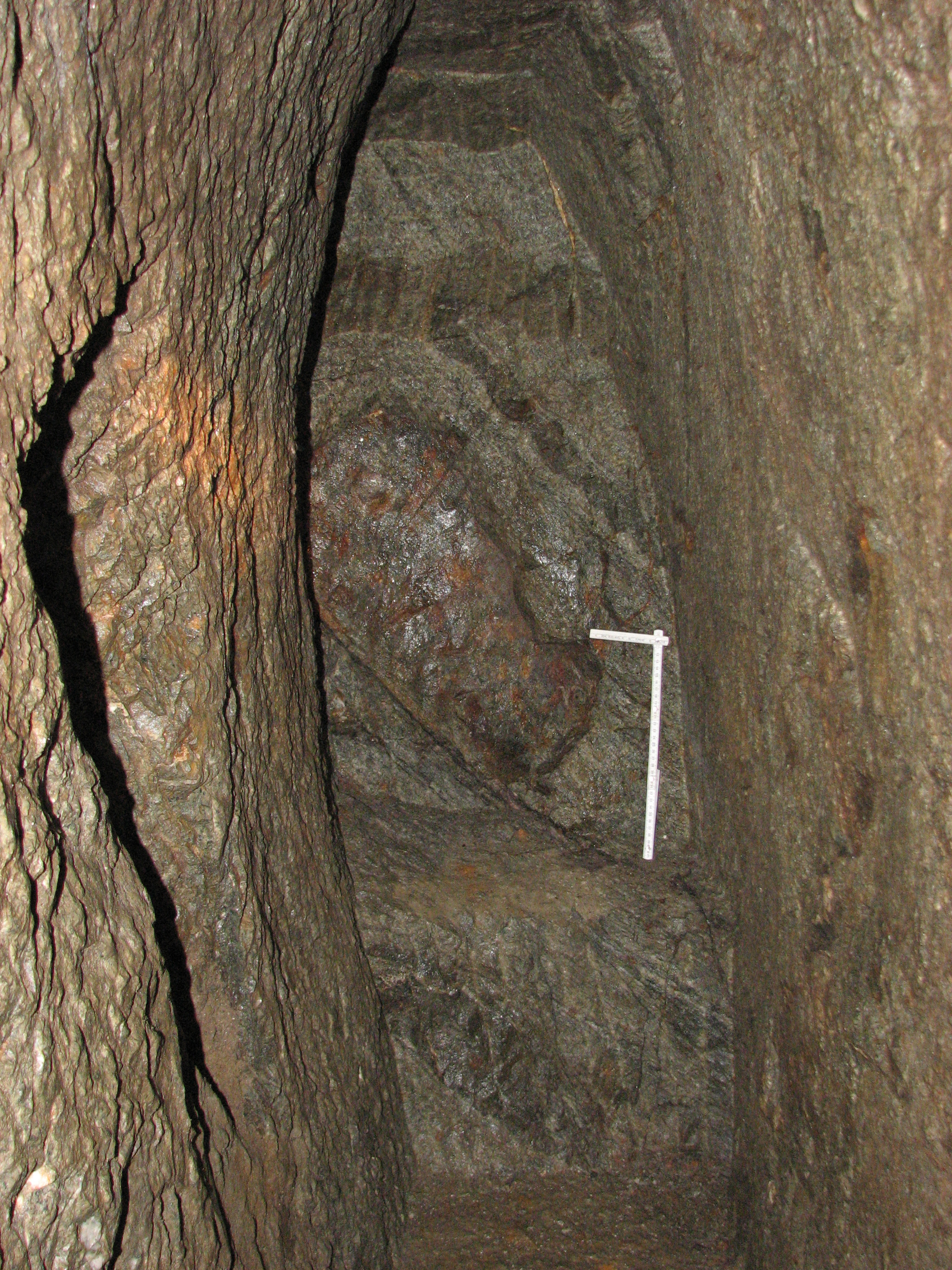
The Mine Gabe Gottes

== People ==
- Laure Diebold, (1915–1965), Compagnon de la Libération
- Eddie Slovik, (1920-1945), Execution By Firing Squad

== Sainte-Marie-aux-Mines Mineral Show ==
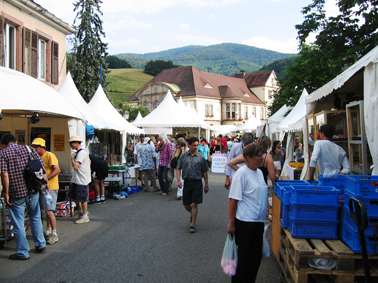
One of the Sainte-Marie-aux-Mines old streets full of mineral and fossil stands during the Mineral & Gem

The Sainte-Marie-aux-Mines Mineral Show, also known as Mineral & Gem in Sainte-Marie-aux-Mines, is an international fair on nature-related arts and mining products that takes place in this Alsatian village, whose economy was formerly focused on regional mining and mineral deposits.

The Mineral Show dates back, like the Mineralientage (Munich, Germany), in the early 1960, when Francois Lehmann organized a small mineral exhibition. In a couple of years the fair becomes a tourist attraction in the area and actually many collectors from Italy, France and Germany are going there. The actual appearance of the Mineral Show started in 1966 when it consolidated the first weekend of July as a fair dates. In 1981 the team led by Michel Schwab gives a professional point of view to the fair. Since 1992, the fair takes place the last week of June. The fair hosts today more than 900 exhibitors from 60 countries.

Over the course of a limited town area, filling the small Sainte-Marie-aux-Mines old town streets, are distributed hundreds of stands exhibiting their minerals, fossils, gems and elaborated stones. Some village buildings, like the Theatre or the School, among others, are also filled with exhibitors. During the four-day fair (the first two days are for professionals only) also carried out parallel events such as conferences, workshops and visits to mines from this valley, known as Val d'Argent (Silver Valley).

Currently the site of the exhibition is roughly divided into two zones with specialized dealers: the Mineral & Fossil Zone, and the Gem Zone. However, the layout of the streets is such that items of either category could be found anywhere.

== See also ==
- Communes of the Haut-Rhin department
