= Union River (St. Vincent) =

Location
- Country: Saint Vincent and the Grenadines

The Union River is a river of Saint Vincent and the Grenadines.

== See also ==
- List of rivers of Saint Vincent and the Grenadines
