= Charlotte Parish, Saint Vincent and the Grenadines =

Charlotte
- Parish
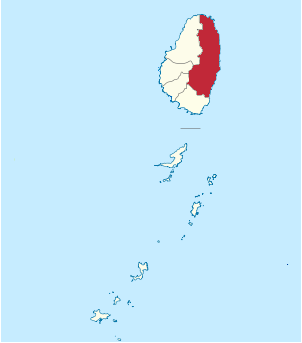
- Map of the Parish of Charlotte
- Coordinates: 13°17′10″N 61°07′22″W
- Country: Saint Vincent and the Grenadines
- Capital: Georgetown

Area
  - Total: 58 sq mi (149 km^{2})
  - Rank: 1st
- Elevation: 3,350 ft (1,021 m)

Population
  - Total: 38,000
  - Density: 660.5/sq mi (255.03/km^{2})

Charlotte is the largest parish of Saint Vincent and the Grenadines, situated on the eastern coast of the island of Saint Vincent. With an area of 149 km², its size is comparable to that of the British Virgin Islands. It’s the country‘s largest parish by area and the second most populous one. The parish has the longest coastline of all the parishes and is also larger than the three smallest parishes combined. The parish possesses a very rough and rugged topography with very little flat land occurring towards the coast. as a result of these features, parts of the north of the parish cannot be accessed by a main road. Up until the building of a bridge over the Rabacca Dry River access to the north side of the river was not possible when rain caused the river to swell and make the path impassable.

Its capital is Georgetown, which is also the second largest settlement in the country.

- Area: 149 km² (57 mi²)
- Population: 38,000 (2000 estimates)

The parish also includes the Cow and Calves, rocks off the north shore of Saint Vincent.

== Populated places ==
The following populated places are located in the parish of Charlotte:

- Adelphi (13°11′37″N 061°08′25″W)
- Biabou (13°11′52″N 061°08′18″W)
- Byera Village (13°15′24″N 061°07′33″W)
- Chapmans (13°17′N 061°07′W)
- Colonarie (13°14′36″N 061°08′09″W)
- Fancy (13°22′N 061°10′W)
- Friendly (13°13′41″N 061°07′45″W)
- Georgetown (13°17′14″N 061°07′48″W)
- Greiggs (13°12′18″N 061°09′33″W)
- Higher Lowmans
- Mesopotamia (13°10′N 061°10′W)
- New Sandy Bay Village (13°21′08″N 061°07′53″W)
- North Union (13°13′04″N 061°08′08″W)
- Orange Hill (13°18′50″N 061°07′45″W)
- Peruvian Vale (13°10′37″N 061°08′45″W)
- Rabaka (13°18′N 061°09′W)
- Richland Park (13°11′59″N 061°10′00″W)
- Sans Souci (13°13′N 061°07′W)
- South Rivers (13°14′N 061°08′W)
- Turema (13°19′15″N 061°08′38″W)
- Waterloo (13°17′57″N 061°08′30″W)
