= RAF Portland =

RAF Portland
- Portland, Dorset in England
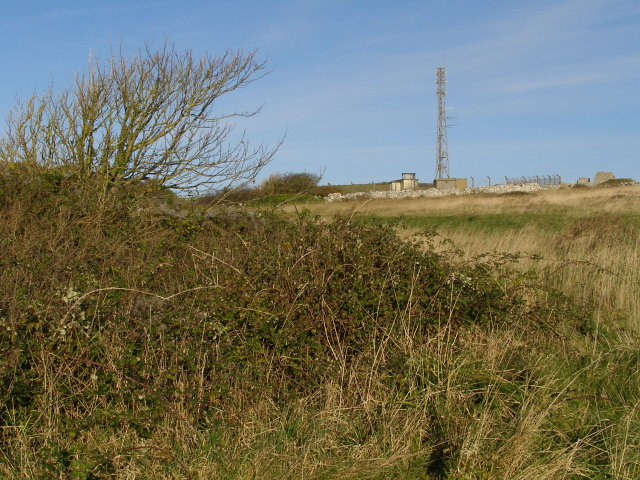
- The Verne area with the Portland Rotor Radar Station seen in the distance

Site information
- Type: Royal Air Force station
- Owner: Ministry of Defence
- Operator: Royal Air Force

Location
- Shown within Dorset RAF Portland (the United Kingdom)
- Coordinates: 50°33′32″N 002°25′53″W

Site history
- Built: 1950
- In use: 1951-2001
- Battles/wars: Cold War

Royal Air Force Portland or more simply RAF Portland is a former Royal Air Force and ROTOR radar station on the Isle of Portland, Dorset, England. Located close to the Verne Citadel and East Cliff, the station was established in the 1950s as part of a nationwide air defence radar system built by the British Government during the Cold War. The station became a scheduled monument in 2004 and is now the site of the community farm, Fancy's Family Farm.

== History ==
During the Second World War, the site was the location of a Chain Home Extra Low (CHEL) radar station. The same site was chosen for the building of Portland's Centimetric Early Warning (CEW) Radar Station in 1950–51 by contractor Robert McAlpine. It was built as part of the ROTOR programme for the detection of Soviet fast-flying jets. Portland's example was one of eight CEW stations built across the country. It was equipped with various 'Stage One' radar systems.

Portland's station was reduced to CHEL readiness only in 1956 and became non-operational in 1958. It was then taken over by the US Air Force who had a microwave relay station built on site. The underground section of the station, though no longer in use by this time, was later damaged by fire in 1969. The 1963 film The Damned used the station as the Edgecliff Military Establishment.

Having used the site as a dog training centre during the 1990s, the Ministry of Defence sold the former station in 2001. The site was then used primarily as horse stables. In 2011, Fancy's Family Farm, a community farm based on the island, relocated to the station from Southwell. Owned by Su and Jon Illsley, the couple pursued the farm as a hobby to look after rare breed Portland sheep. It developed as a popular community farm, but had to relocate in 2011 after the Illsleys faced eviction from the original site. The farm moved to the station during June 2011, and the grassland site was then tidied, with the former USAF building refurbished to become the farm's main centre of operations. The farm opened on 1 April 2012.

In recent years, the site has been listed on Historic England's "Heritage at Risk" register. It is described as having "extensive significant problems". In 2013, a one-off event was set up to allow Subterranea Britannica members to enter the underground section of the station. The bunker was then sealed and alarmed due to copper thefts in previous years.

== Design ==
The enclosed site is accessed to the west, with a former guardhouse located at the entrance. Within the enclosure is the former guardroom, which is a single storey building, resembling a bungalow. It provided the access to the bunker, which contained the station's control centre. The site was originally equipped with seven radar towers, now dismantled. The operations block of reinforced concrete was designed to withstand 2,000 lb bombs. A large reservoir on the site provided water to the bunker.

The bunker still retains its original air conditioning plant, fans, mains transformer, blast doors, electrical switchgear and rotary converters. There is more original equipment at the station than in any other surviving R1 or R2 ROTOR bunkers. In addition, it is the only ROTOR bunker to retain the original 'Phase 1' layout. The 1969 fire saw much damage inflicted on the main operations room, while other areas also have remaining soot. On ground level, six radar plinths remain intact together with the emergency exit blockhouse and the old USAF compound.

== See also ==
- List of former Royal Air Force stations#Chain Home, Chain Home Low, Chain Home Extra Low, ROTOR and tropo-scatter stations
