= Richmond River (St. Vincent) =

Coordinates: 13°18′N 61°15′W

Location
- Country: Saint Vincent and the Grenadines

The Richmond River is a river of Saint Vincent and the Grenadines.

== See also ==
- List of rivers of Saint Vincent and the Grenadines
