= Le Bonhomme =

Commune in Grand Est, France

- Commune
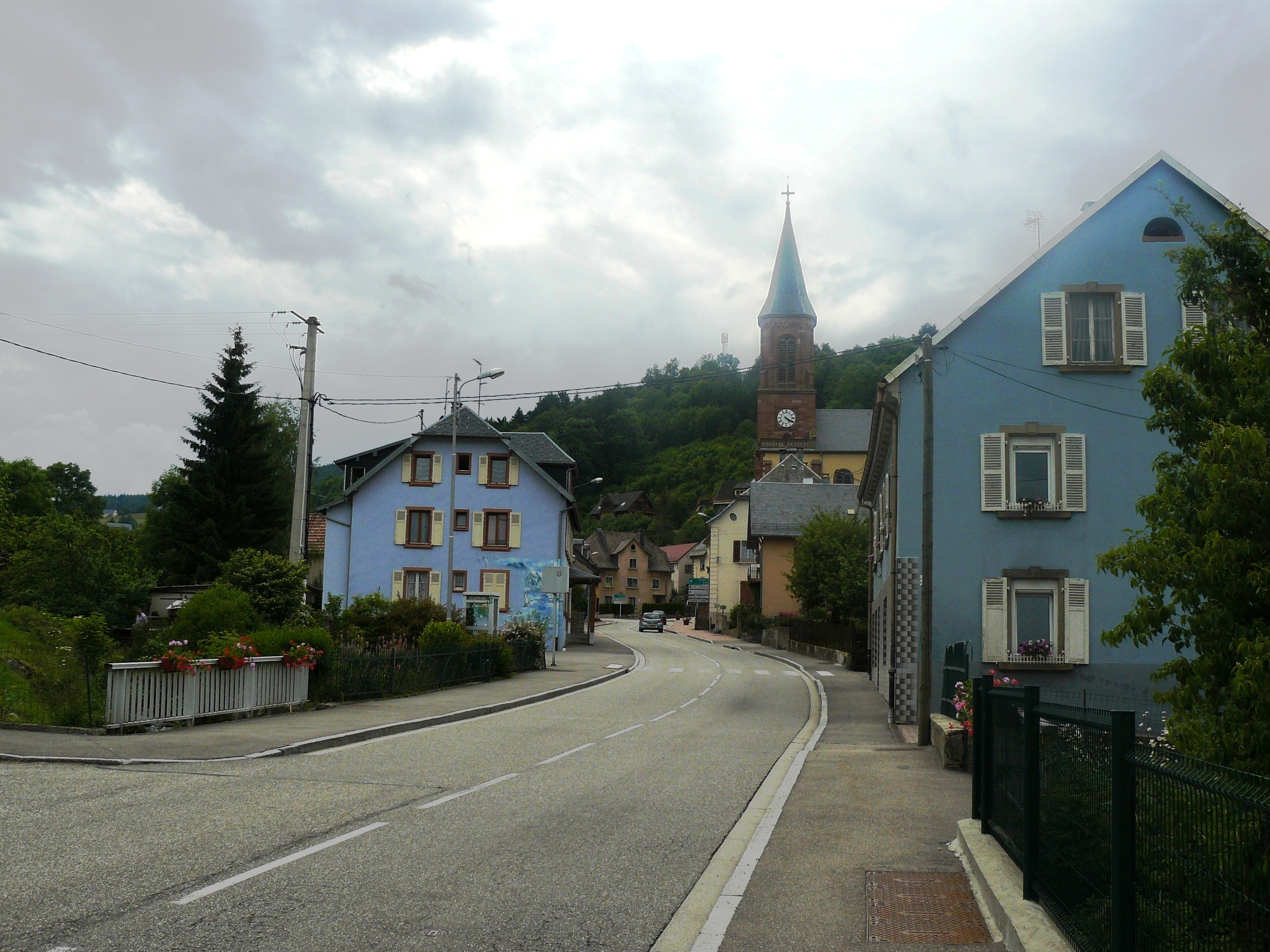
- The main road in Le Bonhomme

- Coat of arms
- Location of Le Bonhomme
- Location within France Location within Grand Est
- Coordinates: 48°10′24″N 7°06′51″E
- Country: France
- Region: Grand Est
- Department: Haut-Rhin
- Arrondissement: Colmar-Ribeauvillé
- Canton: Sainte-Marie-aux-Mines
- Intercommunality: Vallée de Kaysersberg

Government
  - Mayor (2020–2026): Frédéric Perrin
- Area^{1}: 21.98 km^{2} (8.49 sq mi)
- Elevation: 690 m (2,260 ft)
- Highest elevation: 1,231 m (4,039 ft)
- Lowest elevation: 644 m (2,113 ft)
- Population (2023): 744
  - Density: 33.8/km^{2} (87.7/sq mi)
- Time zone: UTC+01:00 (CET)
  - Summer (DST): UTC+02:00 (CEST)
- INSEE/Postal code: 68044 /68650
- ^{1} French Land Register data, which excludes lakes, ponds, glaciers > 1 km^{2} (0.386 sq mi or 247 acres) and river estuaries.

Le Bonhomme (French pronunciation: [lə bɔnɔm]; German: Diedolshausen; Alsatian: Bonom) is a village and commune in the Haut-Rhin département of north-eastern France. It lies at the eastern foot of the Col du Bonhomme.

== History ==
The early history of the village is closely linked to that of the castles of Gutenbourg and Hohenack, which formerly, together with the village of Diedolshausen and other localities, belonged to the Hohnack or Urbeis district of the Lordship of Rappoltstein.

From 1871 until the end of the First World War, Diedolshausen was part of the German Empire as part of the territory of Alsace–Lorraine and was assigned to the Rappoltsweiler district in the Upper Alsace region.

== Tourism ==
Le Bonhomme covers 2,212 hectares, including forests and pastures. Its economy is typical of a mountain village: cattle breeding, agricultural activities, cheese production, etc. In 1945, the commune still had 70 farms; by 1975, only about twenty remained. Le Bonhomme also has thirteen ski slopes within the ski area of the Lac Blanc resort, offering both cross-country and alpine skiing, all served by eight lifts.

== See also ==
- Communes of the Haut-Rhin department
