= Bonhomme (surname) =

Bonhomme is a surname. The word comes from the French language and literally means "good man", also meaning "fellow", "old man" or "chap."

Notable people with the surname include:

- Jacques Bonhomme, real name Guillaume Cale (died 1358), leader of the Jacquerie peasant revolt in 1358
- Yolande Bonhomme (c. 1490–1557), French printer and bookseller
- H. D. Bonhomme (1747–1826) Dutch army officer and statesmen of the Batavian Republic and Kingdom of Holland
- Jean Bonhomme (1924–2020), French politician
- Jean Bonhomme (1937–1986), Canadian tenor
- Trevor Bonhomme (1942–2017), South African politician
- Paul Bonhomme (born 1964), English aerobatics and commercial airliner pilot and race pilot
- Stéphane Bonhomme (born 1976), French economist
- Tessa Bonhomme (born 1985), Canadian ice hockey player and sports reporter
- Mandy Bonhomme, stage name of voice actress Amanda Goodman (fl. 1987–present)
- D. K. Bonhomme (born 1999), Canadian football player
