= My Fancy =

Variety hall performer

- Born: Mae Rose Baker; 23 May 1878; St Louis, Missouri, U.S.
- Died: 24 February 1933 (aged 54); Ramsgate, Kent, England
- Other name: Mae Rose Bawn
- Occupation: Dancer

Mae Rose Bawn (née Baker; 23 May 1878 – 24 February 1933), who used the stage name "My Fancy", was an American-born dancer who performed in British music halls billed as "The Queen of Sand Dancers".

== Life and career ==
She was born in St Louis, Missouri, and joined the Barnum & Bailey touring company at the age of eight. She trained as an acrobat, dancer, illusionist and trapeze artist, and worked with another girl as the Macumber Sisters. In 1894, she travelled to England, and made her debut under her own name at the London Pavilion in December 1894, before transferring to the Oxford Music Hall where she first appeared using the name "My Fancy" in March 1895. The reason for her unusual choice of stage name is not reported.

She was later credited with introducing sand dancing and buck-and-wing dancing to England. She was billed as "The Queen of Sand Dancers", and specialised in barefoot dancing. She took part in worldwide tours, including the opening of Hammerstein's Olympia in New York in 1896, as well as visits to Australia, India and South Africa. She also performed at the Folies Bergère in Paris. She settled in England, married comedian and impressionist Harry Bawn (né Beales; 1872–1921) in 1898, and had a child.

She returned to performing, and in 1908 introduced a routine, Winter, Spring, and Summer, which incorporated skating on marble, and paper folding to produce a new costume. The Sheerness Guardian and East Kent Advertiser included this review:

The art of step-dancing has reached perfection in the person of "My Fancy," the famous danseuse, who is delighting audiences at the [Sheerness] Hippodrome this week. If you can imagine a succession of speedy and difficult movements executed in breathtaking haste, but yet well ordered and in perfect time and rhythm, then you have an idea of the art of which "My Fancy" is so able an exponent. Her dancing is unlike that which is at the present taking London by storm. She executes no dream waltzes, no gliding, fantastic movements; there are no wave-like ripples of the arms, no poetic motions. The key-words of "My Fancy’s" dancing are rhythm and vigour. With her body perfectly rigid and her arms practically motionless, she trips out fleet and airy measures, and great applause is hers...

She appeared at the first ever Royal Command Performance, held at the Palace Theatre in July 1912 in front of King George V. She also directed a number of music halls in London with her husband.

She died in Ramsgate, Kent, in 1933, aged 54.
