= Buccament River =

River of the Caribbean island of Saint Vincent

Coordinates: 13°11′N 61°17′W

The Buccament River is a river in the south-west of Saint Vincent. It rises on the western slopes of Grand Bonhomme, flowing west to reach the Caribbean Sea close to the town of Layou.

== Important Bird Area ==
A 572 ha site encompassing the watershed has been designated an Important Bird Area (IBA) by BirdLife International because it supports significant populations of lesser Antillean swifts, purple and green-throated caribs, Antillean crested hummingbirds, Saint Vincent amazons, Caribbean elaenias, Grenada flycatchers, scaly-breasted thrashers, brown tremblers, rufous-throated solitaires, lesser Antillean euphonias, whistling warblers, Saint Vincent tanagers and lesser Antillean bullfinches.
