= HMS Fancy =

Three vessels of the Royal Navy have been named HMS Fancy:

- HMS Fancy (1806) was a 12-gun gun brig launched in 1806. She foundered off Montrose in 1811.
- HMS Fancy (1855) was a Dapper-class gunboat launched in 1855. In 1876 she was placed on harbour service before being sold in 1905.
- HMS Fancy (J308) was an Algerine-class minesweeper launched in 1943. She was sold to the Belgian Navy in 1951, renamed A. F. Dufour and then hulked in 1959 as Nzadi. She was abandoned and sunk in the Belgian Congo in 1960.

== See also ==
- The hired armed pinnace Fancy was a hired pinnace that fought against the Spanish Armada in 1588.
