= Fancy Farm (Bedford, Virginia) =

Historic house in Virginia, United States

- U.S. National Register of Historic Places
- Virginia Landmarks Register
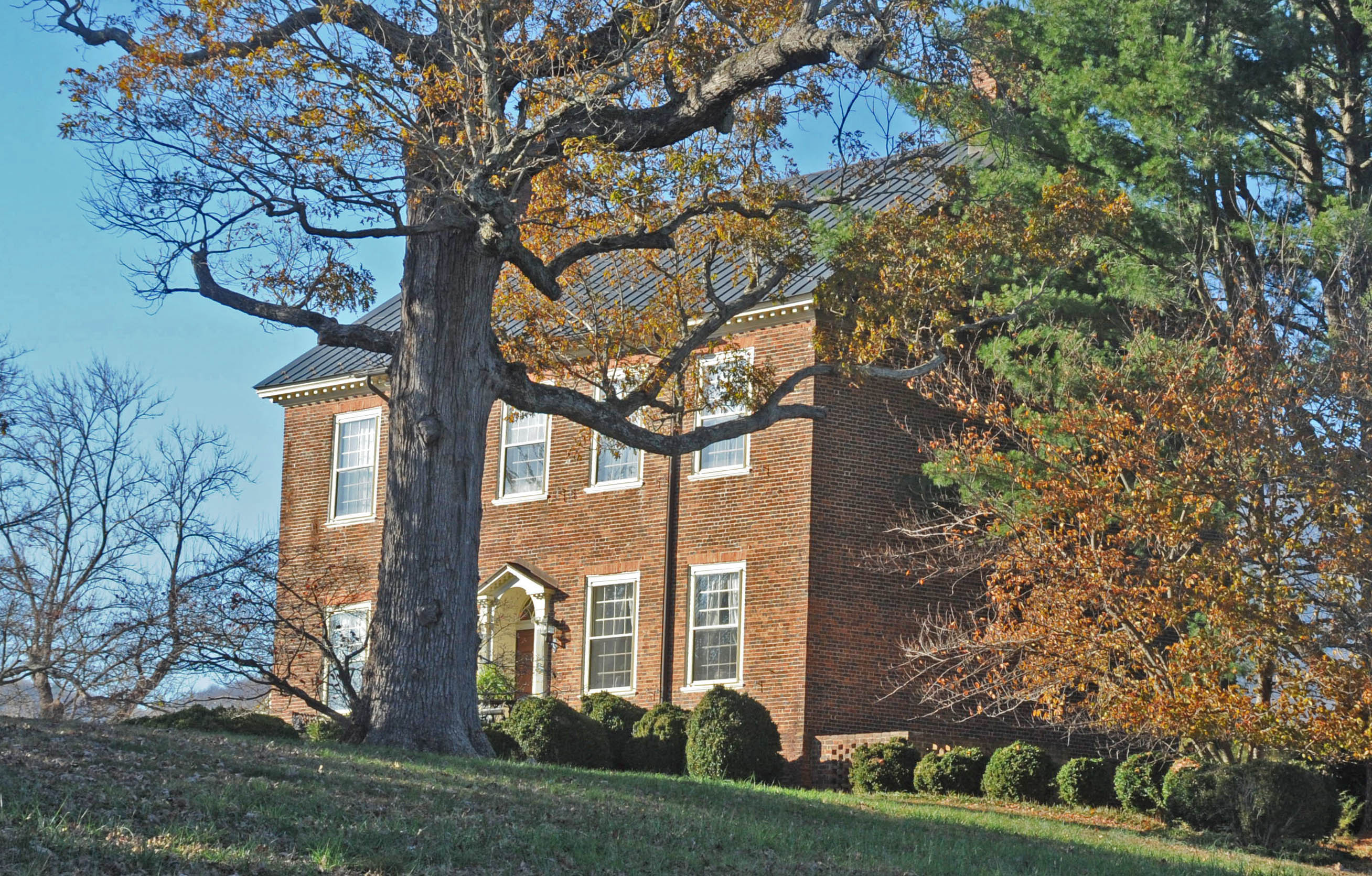

- Location within Virginia Location within the United States
- Location: On VA 43, N of jct. with VA 682, near Bedford, Virginia
- Coordinates: 37°23′53″N 79°33′24″W
- Area: 15 acres (6.1 ha)
- Built: c. 1785
- Architectural style: Georgian, Late Georgian
- NRHP reference No.: 72001384
- VLR No.: 009-0007

Significant dates
- Added to NRHP: January 7, 1972
- Designated VLR: July 6, 1971

Fancy Farm is a historic plantation house located at Kelso Mill, near Bedford, Bedford County, Virginia. It was built about 1785, and is a two-story, five bay brick dwelling in the Late Georgian style. It has a metal gable roof and two interior end chimneys. The interior features original woodwork. The house was restored in 1969–1971. Also on the property are a contributing brick storehouse, a frame kitchen with a stone chimney, and a frame quarters also with a stone chimney. The property features a panorama of the Peaks of Otter. Fancy Farm was used as the headquarters of Union General David Hunter in his Lynchburg campaign during the Valley Campaigns of 1864.

It was listed on the National Register of Historic Places in 1971.
