= Fancy River =

Coordinates: 13°22′58″N 61°10′15″W

Location
- Country: Saint Vincent and the Grenadines

The Fancy River is a river of Saint Vincent and the Grenadines.

== See also ==
- List of rivers of Saint Vincent and the Grenadines
