= Château de Hohenack =

Castle in France

Coordinates: 48°05′39″N 7°11′03″E

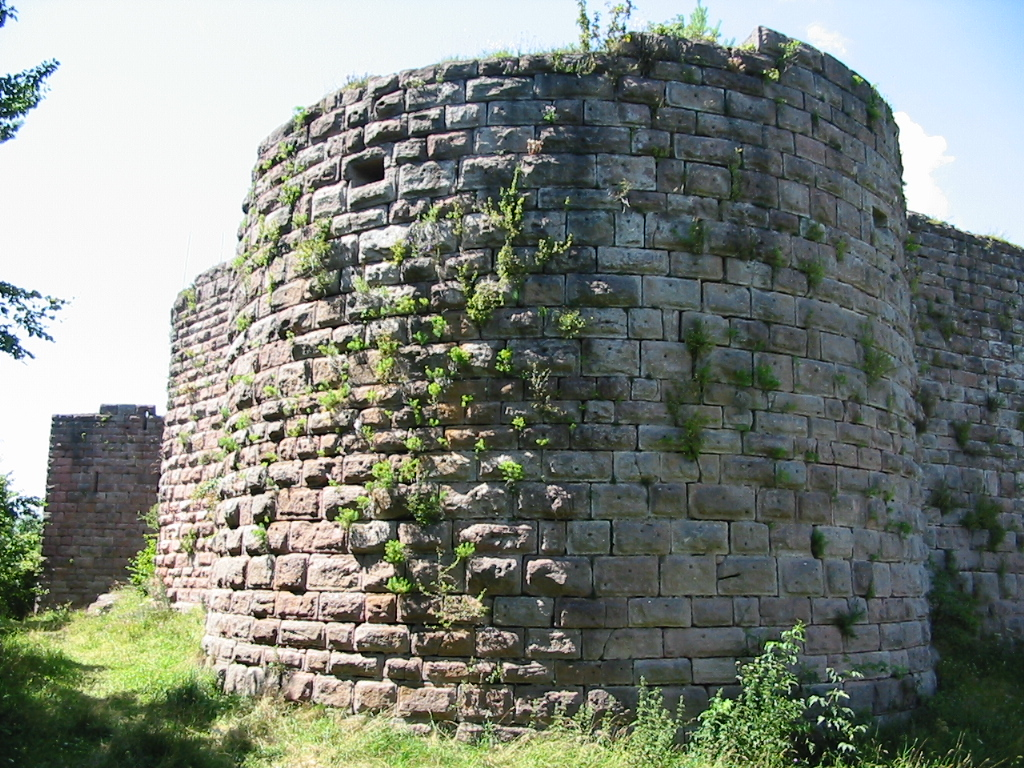

The Château de Hohenack (also described as Château du Hohenack and Château féodal du Petit Hohnack) is a ruined castle in the commune of Labaroche in the Haut-Rhin département of France.

Significant building periods were the last quarter of the 12th century, the 13th, 15th and 16th centuries. In plan view, the edifice is typical of the 12th century, constituting a polygonal curtain wall and a square keep. The castle served both military and administrative functions before being destroyed in 1655 on the orders of the King of France. During the French Revolution, the ruin was sold as national property and, until 1898, it was treated as a quarry. The castle has suffered war damage. The property of the state, it has been listed since 1905 as a monument historique by the French Ministry of Culture.

== See also ==
- List of castles in France
