= Biabou =

- Location in Saint Vincent and the Grenadines
- Coordinates: 13°11′52″N 061°08′18″W
- Country: Saint Vincent and the Grenadines
- Island: Saint Vincent
- Parish: Charlotte

Biabou is a village in eastern Saint Vincent, in Saint Vincent and the Grenadines. It is located to the northeast of the capital, Kingstown, on the coast road linking the capital with Georgetown in the island's northeast. Biabou lies to the north of Peruvian Vale and south of North Union.
