= Bonhomme Creek =

Stream in Missouri, United States

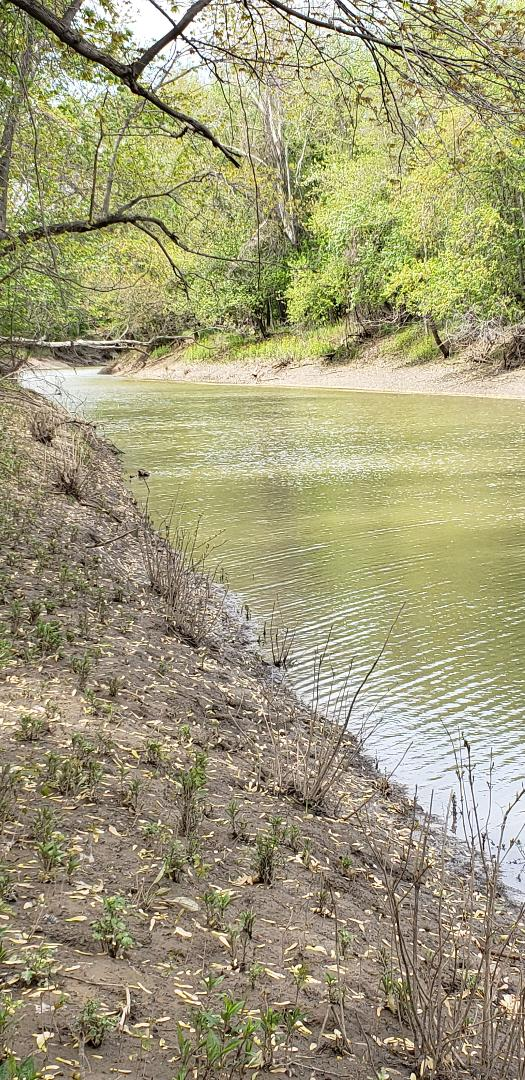
Bonhomme Creek, Chesterfield MO

Bonhomme Creek (/ˈbɒnəm/ BON-əm) is a stream in western St. Louis County in the U.S. state of Missouri. It is a tributary of the Missouri River.

The stream headwaters arise southeast of the community of Pond and it flows generally north passing under Missouri Route 100 and Missouri Route 109 and the community of Orrville. The stream enters the Missouri floodplain south of Gumbo, passes north of US Route 40 north of Chesterfield and enters the Missouri River.

The stream source is at 38°34′45″N 90°39′14″W and the confluence is at 38°40′48″N 90°34′10″W.

Bonhomme is a name derived from French meaning "good man". The English and French names for the stream probably are accurate preservations of the Omaha language term nikadonhe ("good man"), a type of Indian religious leader.

== See also ==
- List of rivers of Missouri
