= Fancy (surname) =

Fancy is a surname. Notable people with the surname include:

- John Fancy (1913–2008), British Second World War airman and prisoner of war whose escapes inspired the book and film The Great Escape
- Richard Fancy (born 1943), American actor
- Stuart Fancy (born 1959), British chess FIDE Master who competes for Papua New Guinean
- Arthur Fancy, a character on the TV series NYPD Blue
