= Georgetown, Saint Vincent and the Grenadines =

Georgetown
- Town
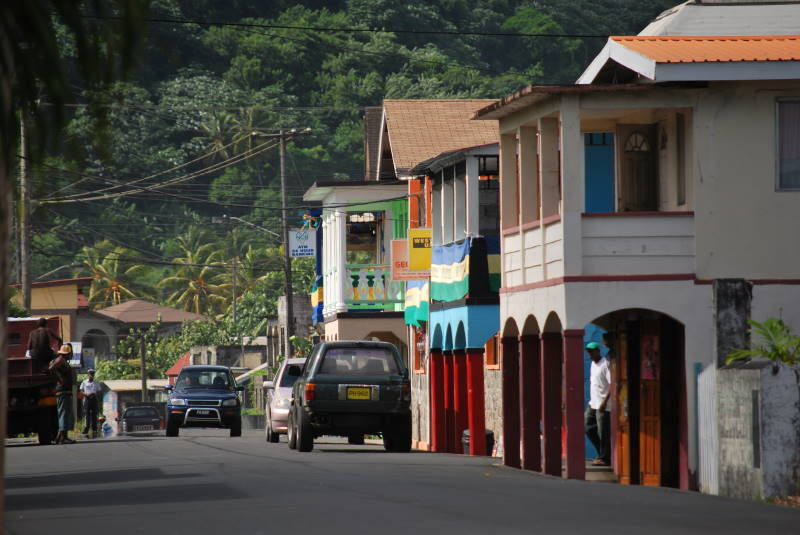
- View of Georgetown

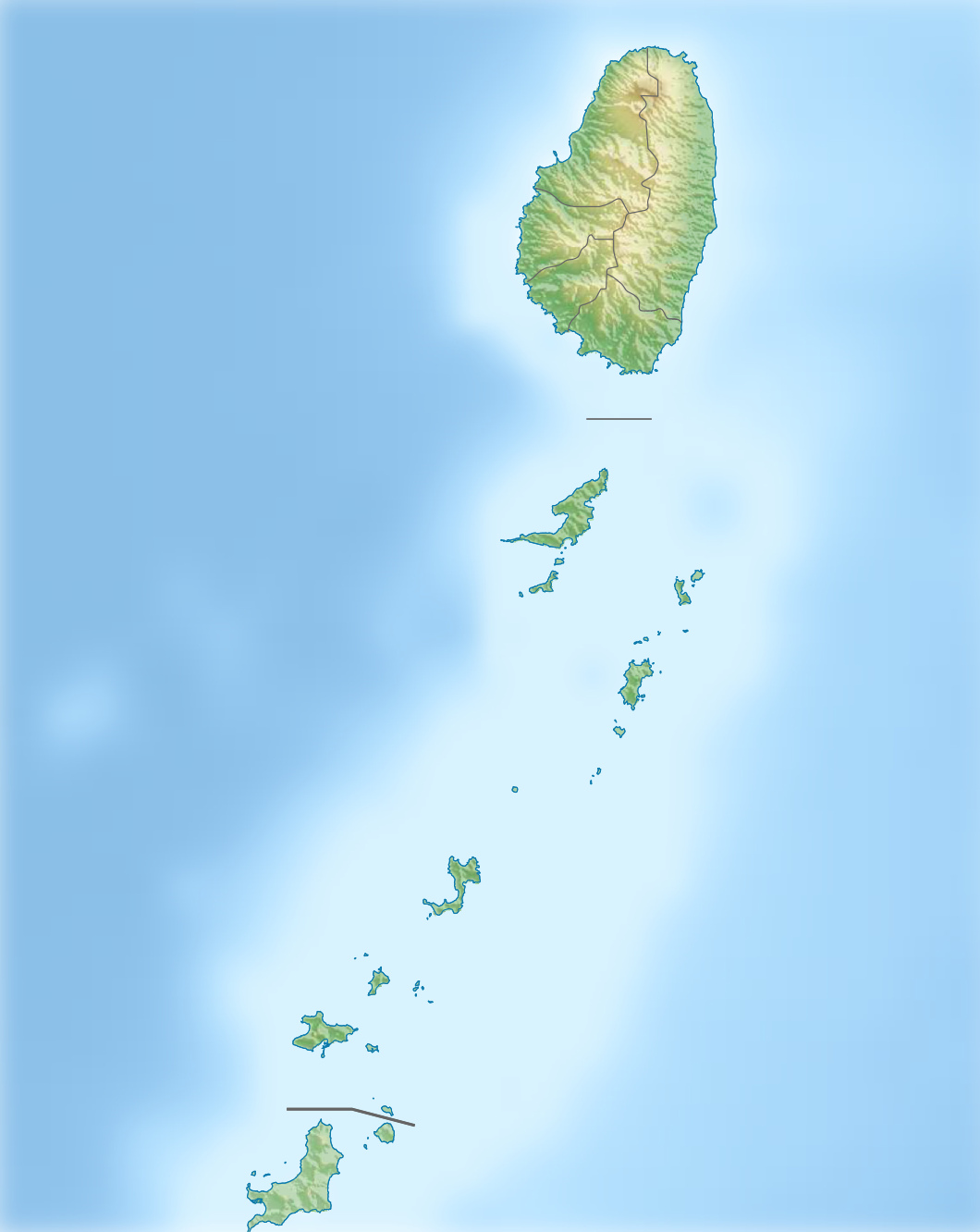
- Location in Saint Vincent and the Grenadines
- Coordinates: 13°17′10″N 61°07′22″W
- Country: Saint Vincent and the Grenadines
- Island: Saint Vincent
- Parish: Charlotte
- Elevation: 21 m (69 ft)
- Time zone: UTC-04:00 (AST)

Georgetown is a town located on the island of Saint Vincent. It is the largest city in Charlotte Parish. Georgetown was one of the main sites for sugar production in the island.

== See also ==
- Saint Vincent and the Grenadines
