= Grand Bonhomme =

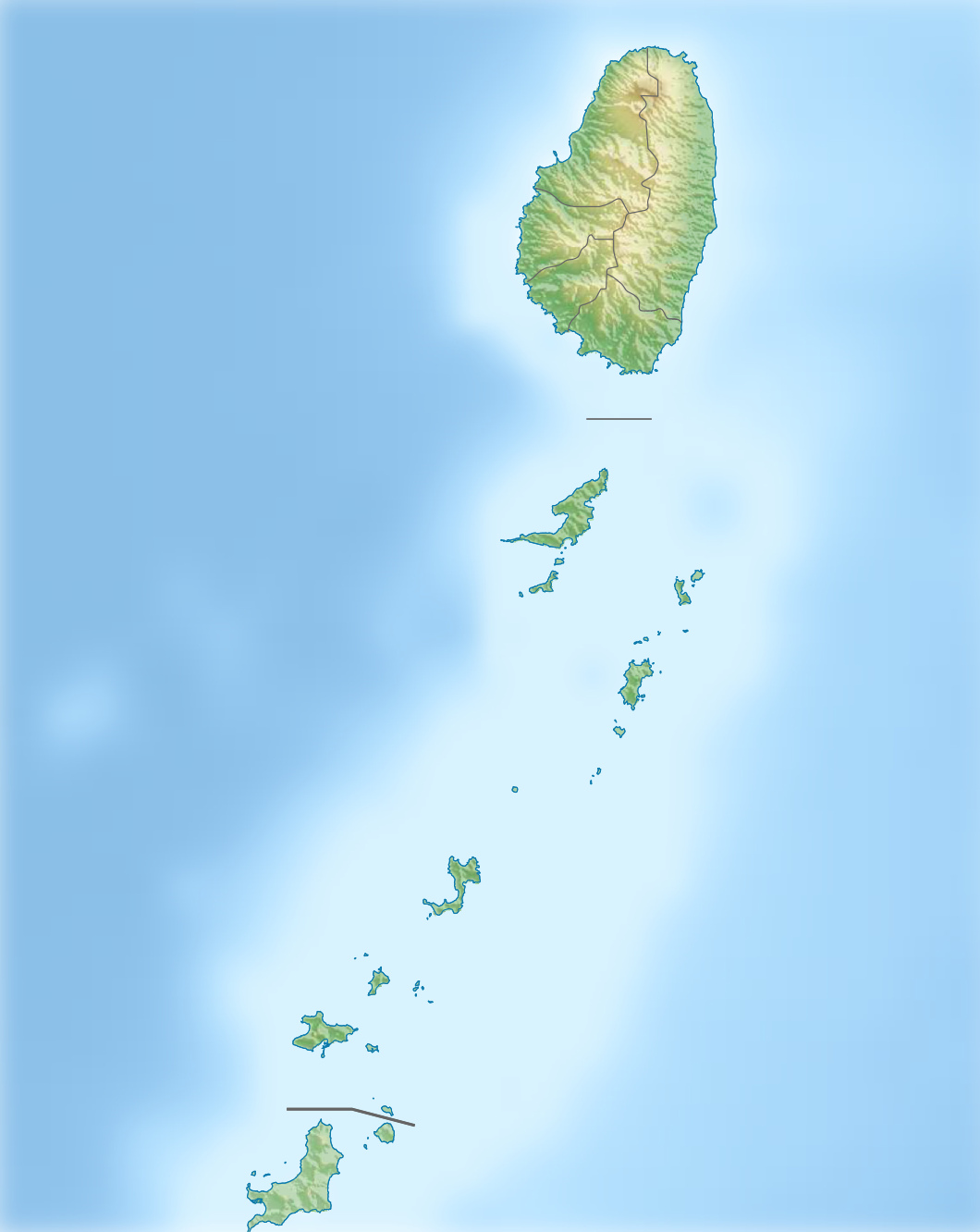
- Location within Saint Vincent and the Grenadines

Highest point
- Elevation: 973 m (3,192 ft) (Note: Sources differ greatly for the elevation of this peak, ranging from as low as 454m to as high as 974m, as well as several figures in between. See the talk page for more information. -May 2014)
- Coordinates: 13°14′N 61°14′W

Naming
- English translation: Tall Fellow

Geography
- Location: Charlotte Parish, Saint Vincent Island, Saint Vincent and the Grenadines

Geology
- Mountain type: Stratovolcano
- Volcanic arc: Lesser Antilles Volcanic Arc

Grand Bonhomme is a mountain in the south of the island of Saint Vincent in Saint Vincent and the Grenadines. It rises to a height of 973 m (3,192 ft).
