= Amanda Aldridge =

British opera singer, teacher and composer (1866–1956)

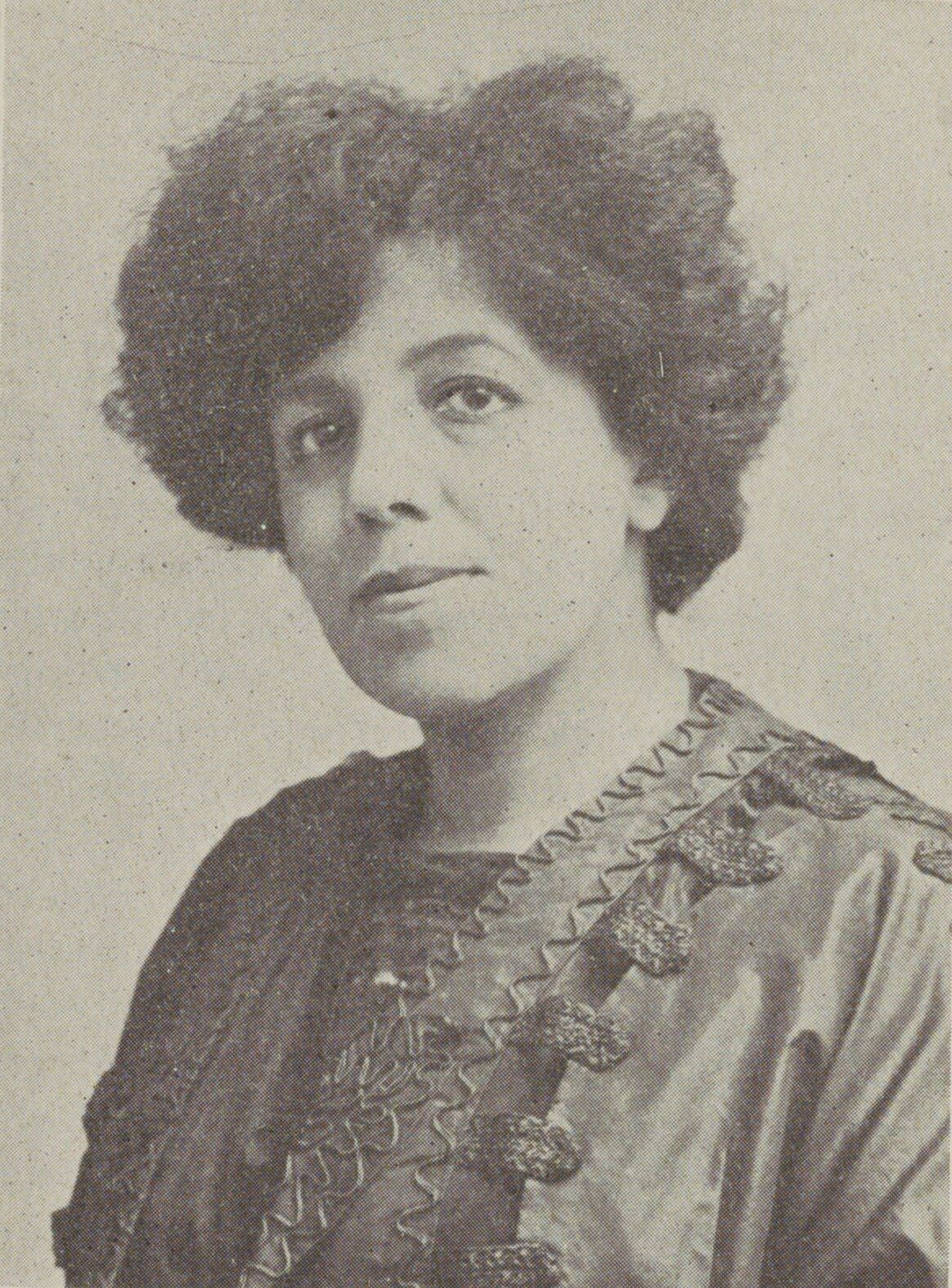
- Aldridge c. 1912
- Born: 10 March 1866; London, England
- Died: 9 March 1956 (aged 89); London, England
- Other names: Montague Ring; Amanda Ira Aldridge
- Father: Ira Aldridge
- Relatives: Luranah Aldridge (sister)

Amanda Christina Elizabeth Aldridge, also known as Amanda Ira Aldridge (10 March 1866 – 9 March 1956), was a British opera singer and teacher who composed love songs, suites, sambas, and light orchestral pieces under the pseudonym of Montague Ring.

Born into an artistic family, the Aldridge legacy included her father who was a successful African-American Shakespearian actor, Ira Frederick Aldridge. He was dubbed the ‘African Roscius' when he first starred as Othello at the Royalty Theatre in London. Her mother, Amanda Brandt, was a Swedish opera singer. Amanda’s sister, Luranah Aldridge was a star operatic contralto in Europe and the United States. A vocal injury of laryngitis cut Amanda’s vocal career short, but she pursued a career as a pianist, teacher, and composer.

== Early life and education ==
Amanda Aldridge was born on 10 March 1866 in Upper Norwood, London, the third child of African-American Shakespearean actor, Ira Frederick Aldridge and his second wife, Amanda Brandt, was Swedish. She had two sisters, Rachael and Luranah, and two brothers, Ira Daniel and Ira Frederick. Aldridge studied voice under Jenny Lind and George Henschel at the Royal College of Music in London, and harmony and counterpoint with Frederick Bridge and Francis Edward Gladstone.

== Career ==
After completing her studies, Aldridge worked as a concert singer, piano accompanist, and voice teacher. A throat condition ended her concert appearances, and she turned to teaching and published about thirty songs between the years 1907 and 1925 in a romantic parlour style, as well as instrumental music in other styles. Among her pupils were the children of London's politically-active Black middle-classes, including Amy Barbour-James, daughter of John Barbour-James, Frank Alcindor son of Dr. John Alcindor, and composer Samuel Coleridge-Taylor's sister Alice Evans. Her notable students included African-American performers Roland Hayes, Lawrence Benjamin Brown, Marian Anderson and Paul Robeson, and Bermudian-British actor Earl Cameron. In 1930, when Robeson performed as Othello in the West End, Aldridge was in attendance, and gave Robeson the gold earrings that her father Ira Aldridge had worn as Othello. Aldridge also took the singer Ida Shepley under her wing and converted her from a singer to a stage actor. In 1951, African-American weekly magazine Jet reported that she was still giving piano and voice lessons aged 86.

Amanda cared for her sister, the opera singer Luranah Aldridge (1860 – 1932), when she became ill, declining an invitation in 1921 from W. E. B. Du Bois to attend the second Pan-African Congress, with a note explaining: "As you know, my sister is very helpless. … I cannot leave for more than a few minutes at a time."

At the age of 88, Aldridge made her first television appearance in the British show Music For You, where Muriel Smith sang Montague Ring's "Little Southern Love Song". After a short illness, she died in London on 9 March 1956, a day before her 90th birthday.

== Legacy and influence ==
In the Autumn 2020 edition of The Historian, Stephen Bourne assessed the composer's life and career in an illustrated feature "At home with Amanda Ira Aldridge". Bourne had previously written Aldridge's article for the Oxford Dictionary of National Biography. In 2022, Google honoured Aldridge's memory with a Doodle.

== Style ==
Aldridge ended her singing career to compose and teach music after laryngitis damaged her throat. Her compositional career spanned from approximately 1906 to 1934. She mainly composed Romantic parlour music, a type of popular music performed primarily in parlours of the middle-class homes, frequently by amateur singers and pianists. Her music was published under the pseudonym Montague Ring. Under this name, she gained recognition for her many voice and piano compositions, including love songs, suites, sambas and light orchestral pieces, in a popular style that was infused with multiple genres.

== Works ==
Selected works include:

- "An Assyrian Love Song," words by F. G. Bowles. London: Elkin & Co., 1921.
- "Azalea," words and music by M. Ring. London: Ascherberg, Hopwood & Crew, 1907.
- "Blue Days of June," words by F. E. Weatherly. London: Chappell & Co., 1915.
- "The Bride," words by P. J. O'Reilly. London: Chappell & Co., 1910.
- Carnival: Suite of Five Dances for solo piano, 1924. Recorded by Rochelle Sennet (Albany Records, 2022)
- "The Fickle Songster," words by H. Simpson. London: Cary & Co., 1908.
- "Little Brown Messenger," words by F. G. Bowles. London: G. Ricordi & Co., 1912.
- "Little Missie Cakewalk," words by Talbot Owen; banjo accompaniment by Clifford Essex. London: Lublin & Co., 1908.
- "Little Rose in My Hair," words by E. Price-Evans. London: Chappell & Co., 1917.
- "Two Little Southern Songs. 1. Kentucky Love song 2. June in Kentucky," words by F. G. Bowles. London: Chappell & Co., 1912.
- "Love's Golden Day," words by E. Price-Evans. London: Chappell & Co., 1917.
- "Miss Magnolia Brown," words and music by M. Ring. London: Francis, Day & Hunter, 1907.
- "My Dreamy, Creamy, Coloured Girl," words and music by M. Ring. London: Ascherberg, Hopwood & Crew, 1907.
- "My Little Corncrake Coon," words by Talbot Owen. London: Lublin & Co., 1908.
- “On Parade,” London: Boosey & Co., 1914.
- "Simple Wisdom," words by H. Simpson. London: Lublin & Co., 1908.
- "A Song of Spring," words by P. J. O'Reilly. London and New York: Boosey & Co., 1909.
- "Summah is de Lovin' Time. A Summer Night," words by P. L. Dunbar. London: Chappell & Co., 1925.
- "A Summer Love Song," words by I. R. A. London and New York: Boosey & Co., 1907.
- "Three African dances". London: Chappell. 1913. OCLC 16395461.
- "Supplication," words by P. J. O'Reilly. London: Leonard & Co., 1914.
- "Through the Day. Three Songs. 1. Morning 2. Noon 3. Evening," words by P. J. O'Reilly. London and New York: Boosey & Co., 1910.
- "'Tis Morning," words by P. L. Dunbar. London: Elkin & Co., 1925.
- "When the Coloured Lady Saunters Down the Street," words and music by M. Ring. London: Ascherberg, Hopwood & Crew, 1907.
- "Where the Paw-Paw Grows," words by Henry Francis Downing. London: Ascherberg, Hopwood & Crew, 1907.
