= The Captive Slave =

1827 painting by John Simpson

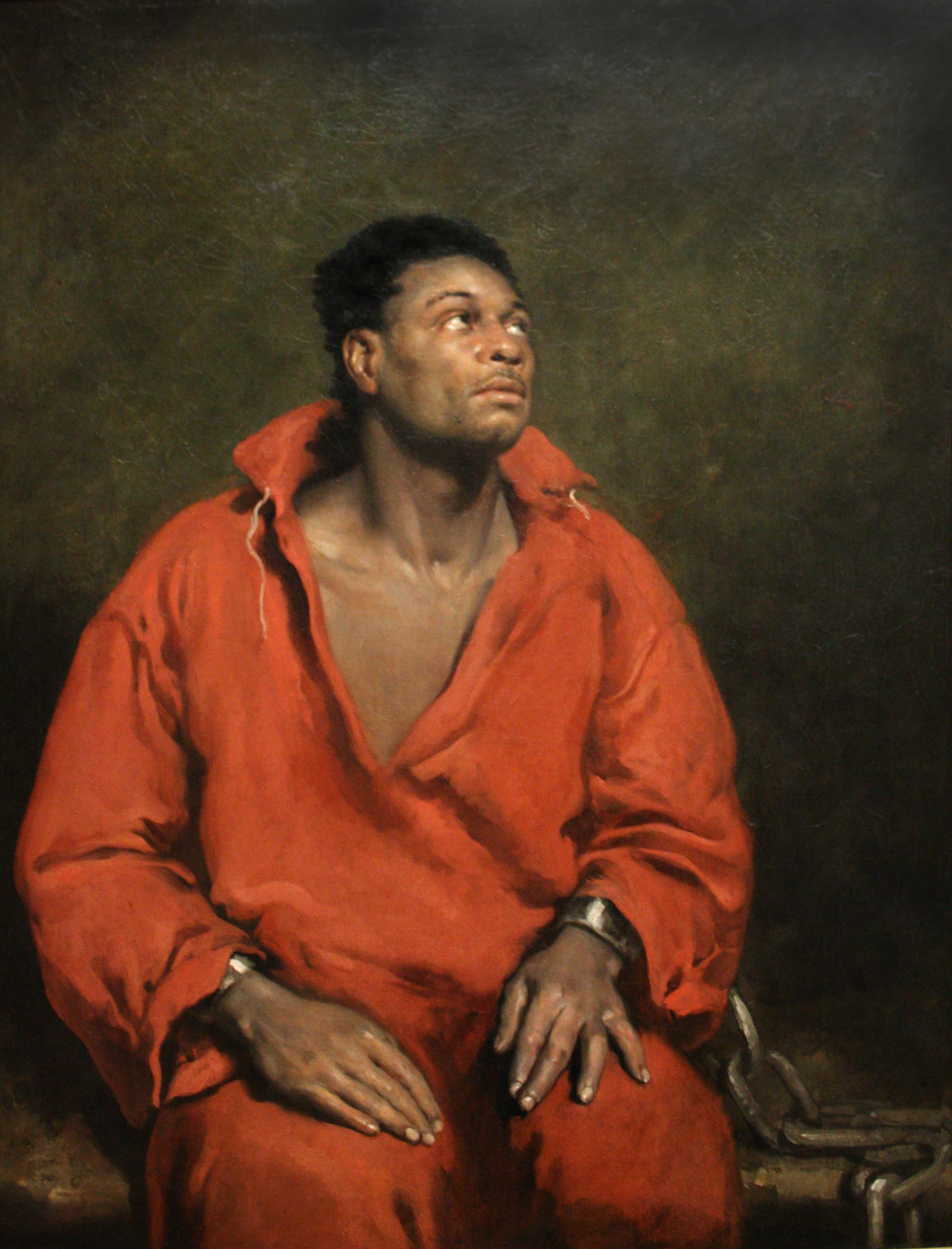
- Artist: John Philip Simpson
- Year: 1827
- Medium: Oil on canvas
- Dimensions: 127 cm. × 101.5 cm. (50 in. × 40 in.)
- Location: Art Institute of Chicago

The Captive Slave is a painting by British artist John Simpson, which was first exhibited in London in 1827. The portrait shows a man, manacled, on a stone bench and looking pensively or plaintively upward. Its subject matter, historical period, and mode of creation suggest the artist intended the painting as an abolitionist statement.

After being displayed again in 1828, the painting was not given another public showing for 180 years, until it was purchased by the Art Institute of Chicago in 2008.

== Painting ==
The three-quarter portrait shows a Black man in orange-red open collar clothing, sitting on a stone bench, against a muted background, with the subject taking up most of the frame. Large metallic manacles are visible around his wrists, which lie on his lap, and a heavy chain falls across the bench and out of the frame. The man is gazing up and to his left.

At its original showing the painting was titled, The Captive Slave, and the viewer is informed of the sitter's condition as a slave by the manacles and by his dark skin, which connects him to the African slave trade. His clothes suggest somewhat foreign origin but also prison garb. The features of the subject show the man as a recognizable individual person. The painting has been described as a portrait but also a hybrid with genre painting, as the name of the character in the painting is unknown. His aspect is saintly or heroic, imploring, vulnerable, and somewhat passive in rest, which allowed British viewers, when the portrait was first shown to sympathize or pity the subject and deplore his condition. While the portrait follows high art conventions for depicting the saintly or long suffering, portraits of individual slaves were rare in the European high art tradition.

== Context ==
The artist, John Simpson, was a British portrait painter who studied at the Royal Academies, and was a longtime assistant of the portraitist Thomas Lawrence. In modern scholarship, Simpson is described as little known. The painting was created on a used canvas that x-rays showed had previously depicted a stately home and another portrait; this reuse suggests that Simpson did not paint it on commission, which is how he made his living, but here he appears to have chosen the subject of his own volition. The portrait was displayed in London at the Royal Academy Exhibition of 1827, and again in London at the British Institution in 1828; that year, it was also displayed at an exhibition at the Liverpool Academy (the port of Liverpool had been highly involved in transatlantic slave trade). Several contemporary reviews at that time noted the pathos that the painting evoked, and associated the painting with "radical" or "sentimental" abolitionist literature. The level of attention it received is also suggested by it quickly being reproduced in printings at the time.

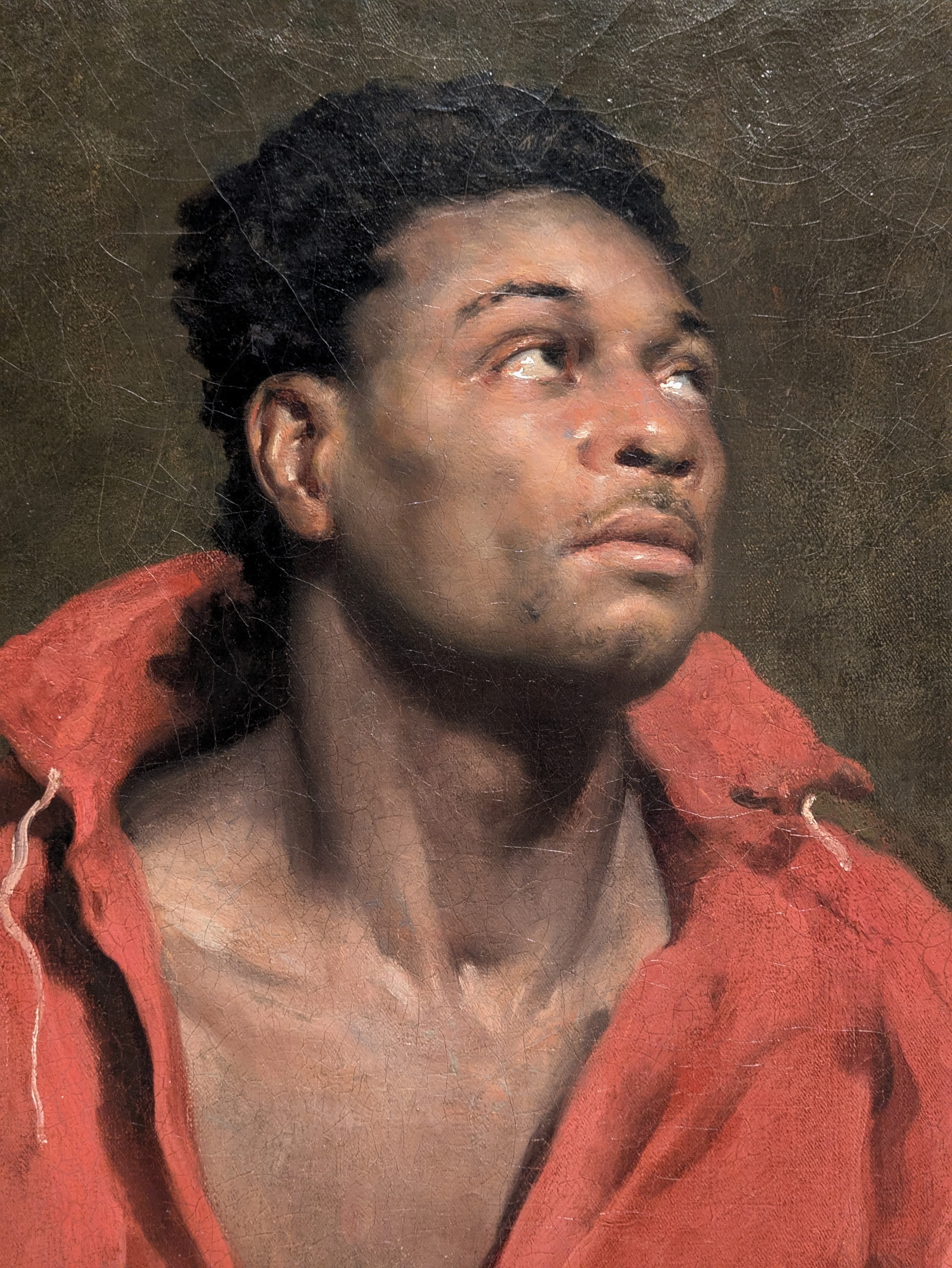
Detail, thought to be a portrait of the actor Ira Aldridge

In the late 1820s, British abolitionists were agitating for the end of slavery throughout the British Empire. While Britain's involvement in the Atlantic slave trade had been abolished in 1807, the freedom of those remaining in slavery was still a pressing political question. Against this background, the production and display of the painting is understood as an effort to further the cause of abolition. Simpson included lines of William Cowper' poetry in the first exhibition catalogue: "Ah but! what wish can prosper or what prayer/for merchants rich in cargoes of despair". Reviewer Martin Postle concludes:

Despite enduring critical neglect and eventual obscurity, Simpson was a gifted artist, capable at times of venturing beyond the parameters of society portraiture and his position as a studio assistant. And in one particular work, The Captive Slave, John Simpson produced a painting of iconic status, which can be regarded today as his masterpiece and as a worthy emblem of the aims and achievements of the Abolition Movement.

The model for the painting is thought to be the American-born actor Ira Aldridge. Aldridge was born a free negro and educated in New York, though he left the United States because of the lack of serious acting opportunities there for Black men. He went on to become a successful Shakespearean actor in Europe.

== Provenance ==
The painting was sold in Dublin from a private collection in 1996; at the time of the sale, a label on the frame read "J. Simpson, The Slave". A private British collector later sold it to an art dealer, who sold it to the Art Institute of Chicago in 2008. Prior to the acquisition by the museum where it underwent scientific testing, the painting had not been displayed to the general public for 180 years. What is now considered to be a copy from an unknown hand is in the collection of the Wilberforce House museum in Hull, England.
