= John Simpson (artist) =

English painter (1782–1847)

- Born: John Philip Simpson; 1782; London, England
- Died: 1847 (aged 64–65); Soho, England
- Occupation: Painter
- Notable work: The Captive Slave (1827)

John Philip Simpson (1782 – 1847) was an English painter who specialised in portrait painting.

== Early life and education ==
Simpson was born in London in 1782 and was a student at the Royal Academy and for some years an assistant to Sir Thomas Lawrence, PRA. He obtained some success as a portrait-painter, and eventually a very large practice. From 1807 to his death he was a frequent exhibitor at the Royal Academy and other exhibitions. In 1834 he received a commission to go to Portugal, and painted portraits at Lisbon, where he was appointed painter to the queen of Portugal.

== Career ==
Late 19th-century biographer Sidney Lee was of the opinion that Simpson was "rather a skillful portraitist than an artist and that his portraits are not without power, but lack instinct and penetration." One of John Burnet, the engraver, is in the National Portrait Gallery. William IV and many notable persons in his day sat to him. Simpson died at Carlisle House, Soho, in 1847.

Simpson left two sons, who practised as artists, of whom Charles Simpson died young in 1848, having contributed a few landscapes to the London exhibitions. The other, Philip Simpson, was a student at the Royal Academy, and obtained some success for small domestic subjects from 1824 to 1857. One of these, called ‘I will fight,’ exhibited in the Suffolk Street Gallery in 1824, is in the Townshend collection at the South Kensington Museum.

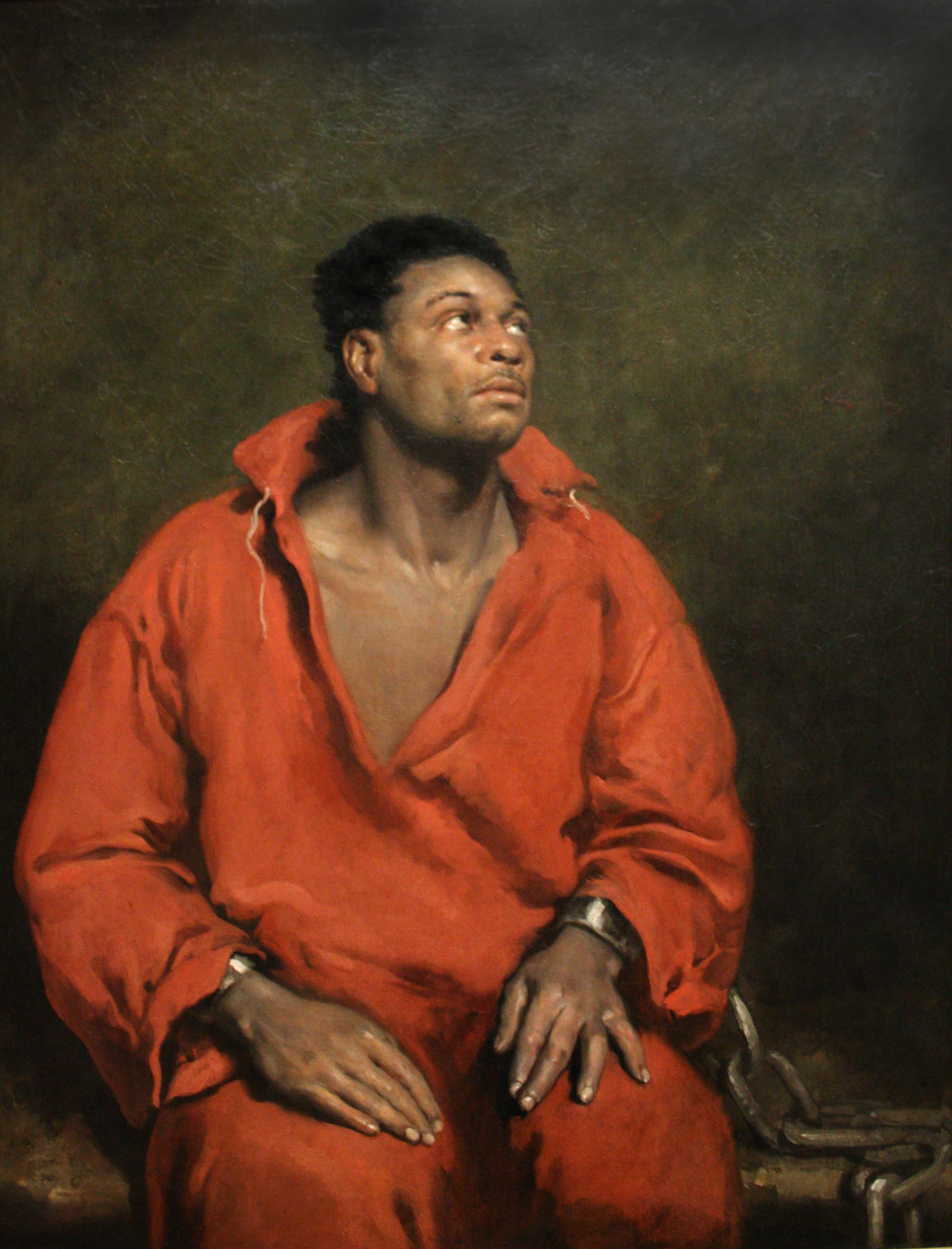
The Captive Slave

== Legacy ==
Simpson's painting The Captive Slave was acquired by the Art Institute of Chicago in 2008 — it had not been displayed to the public for 180 years. Reviewer Martin Postle concludes:

Despite enduring critical neglect and eventual obscurity, Simpson was a gifted artist, capable at times of venturing beyond the parameters of society portraiture and his position as a studio assistant. And in one particular work, The Captive Slave, John Simpson produced a painting of iconic status, which can be regarded today as his masterpiece and as a worthy emblem of the aims and achievements of the Abolition Movement.

== Gallery ==
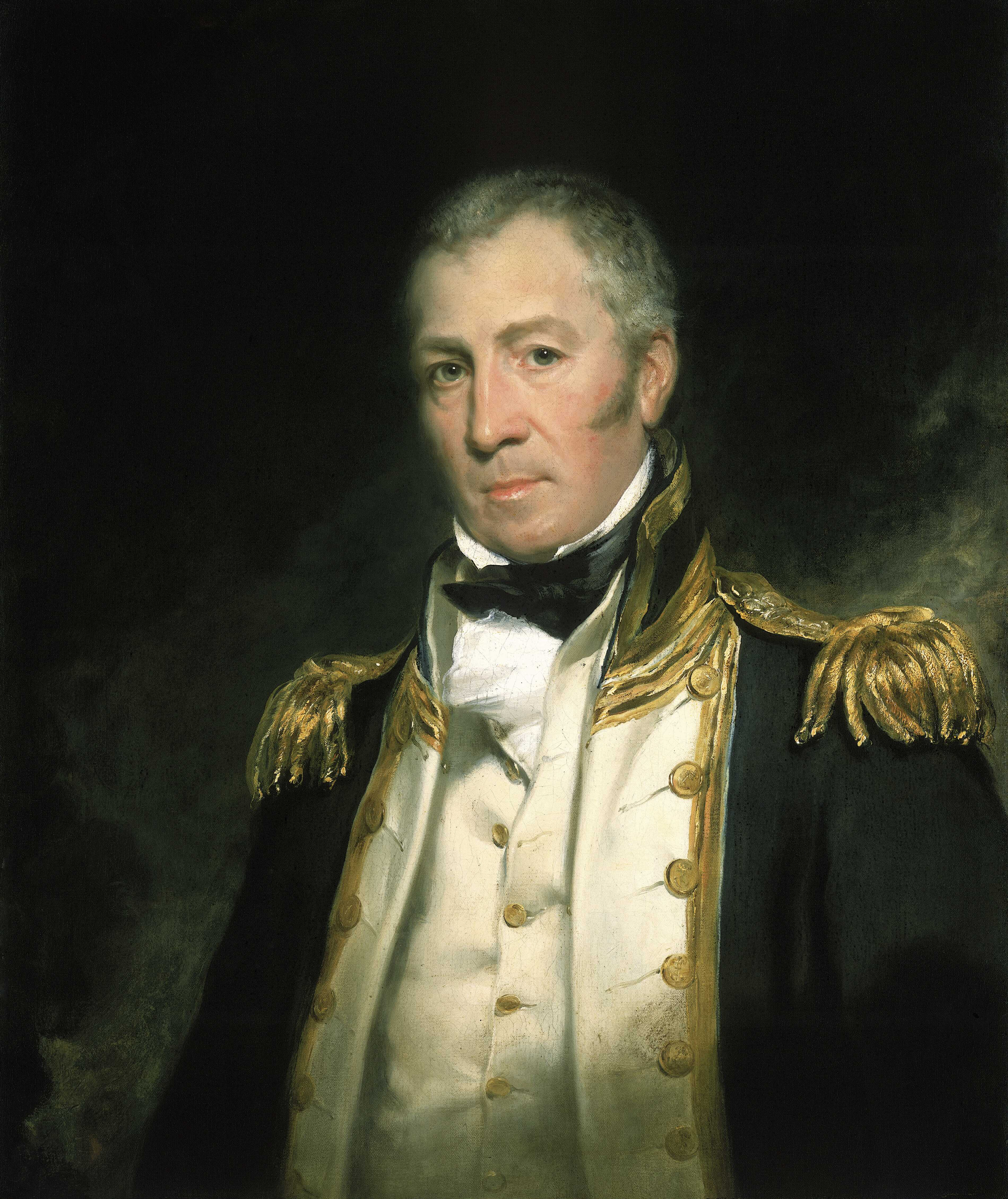
Peter Heywood, 1822

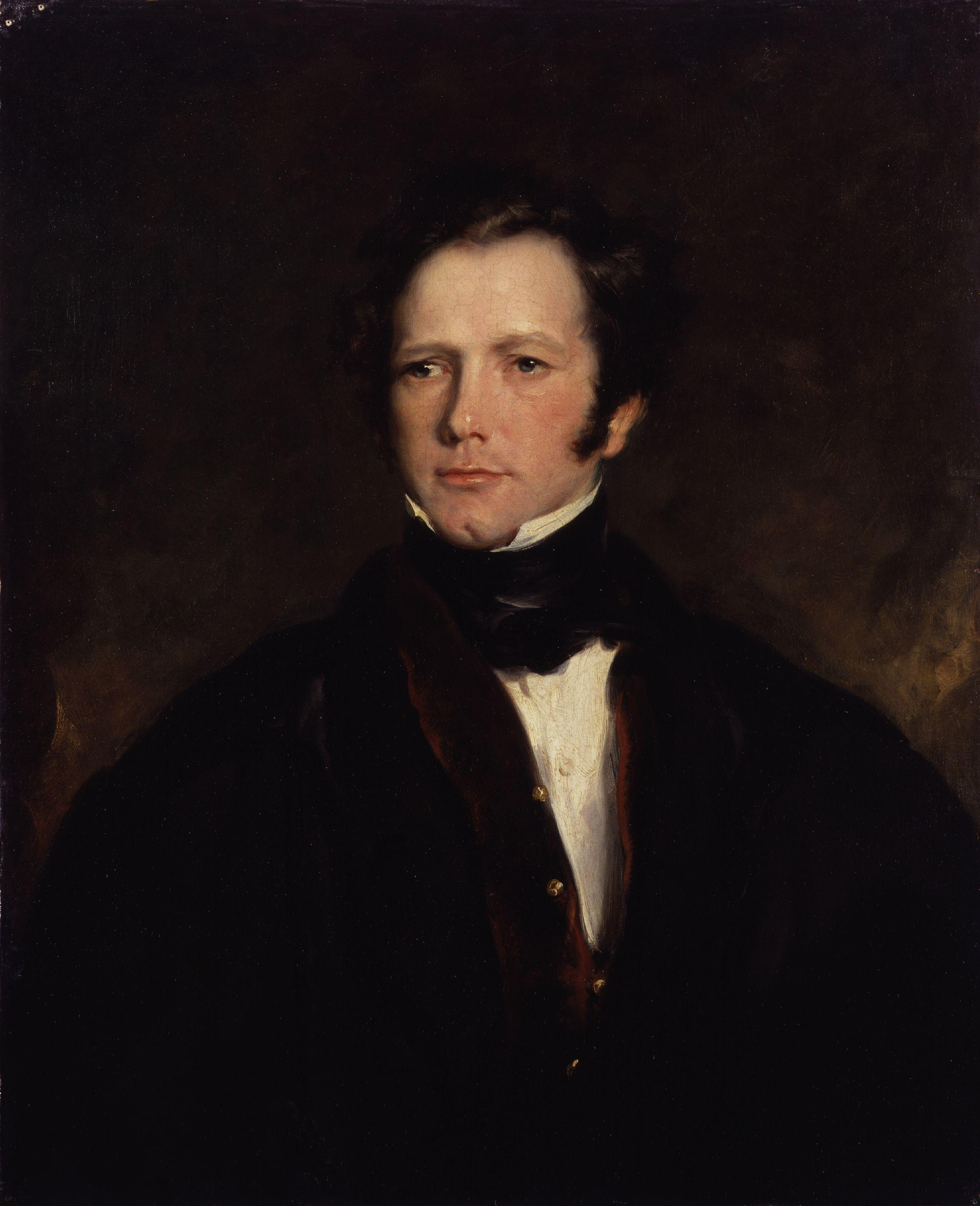
Frederick Marryat, 1826

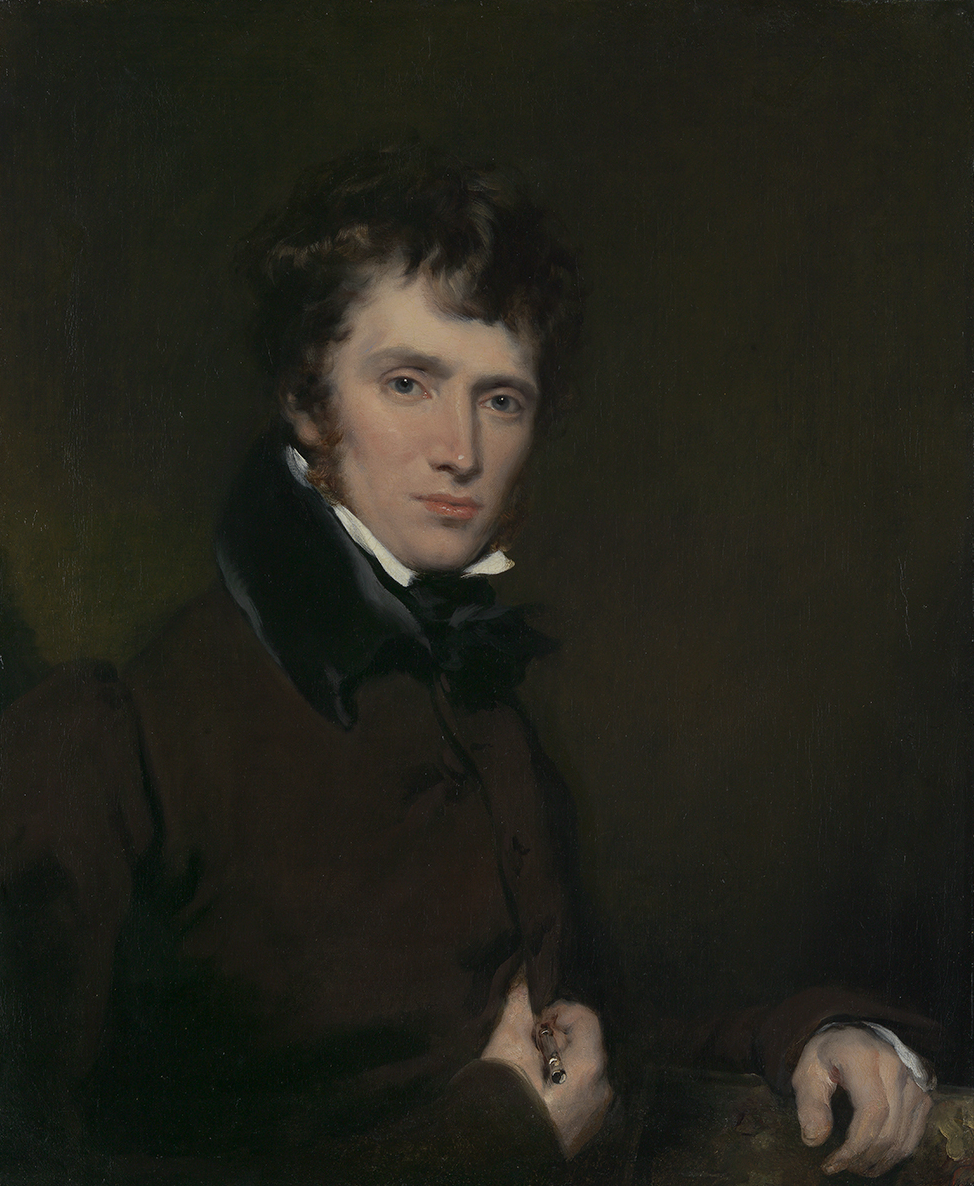
Clarkson Frederick Stanfield, 1829

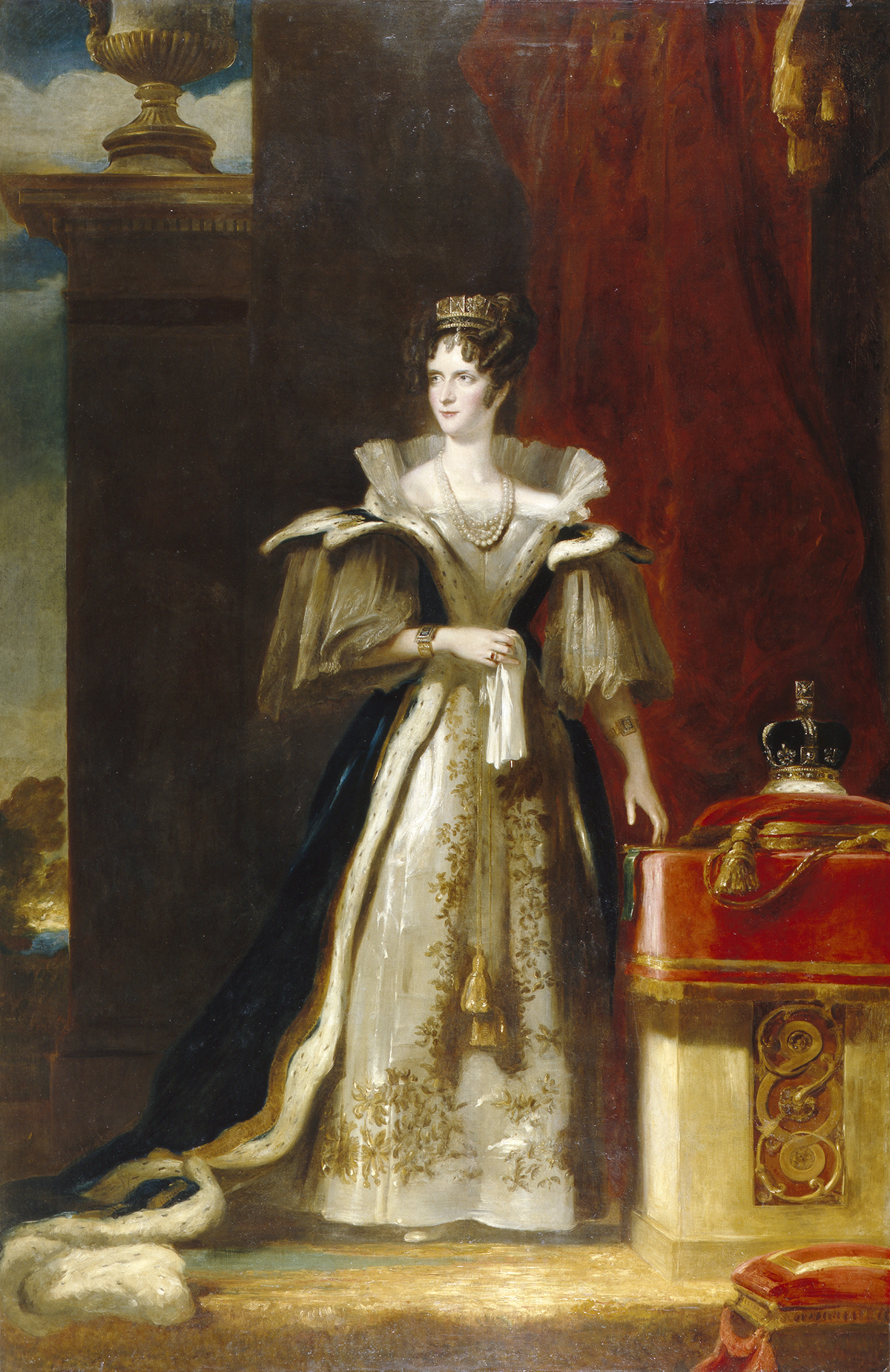
Adelaide of Saxe-Meiningen, 1832

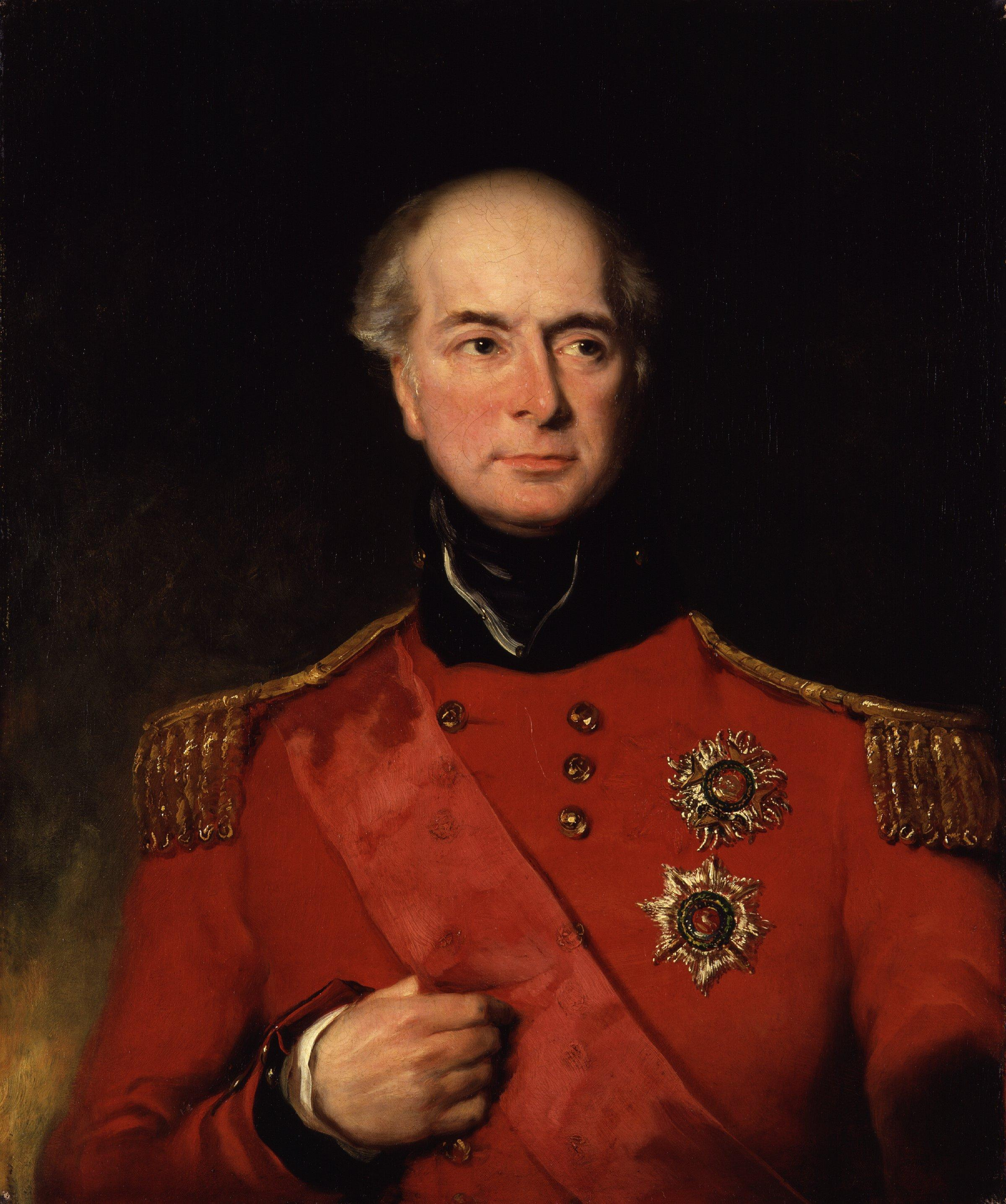
Herbert Taylor, 1833

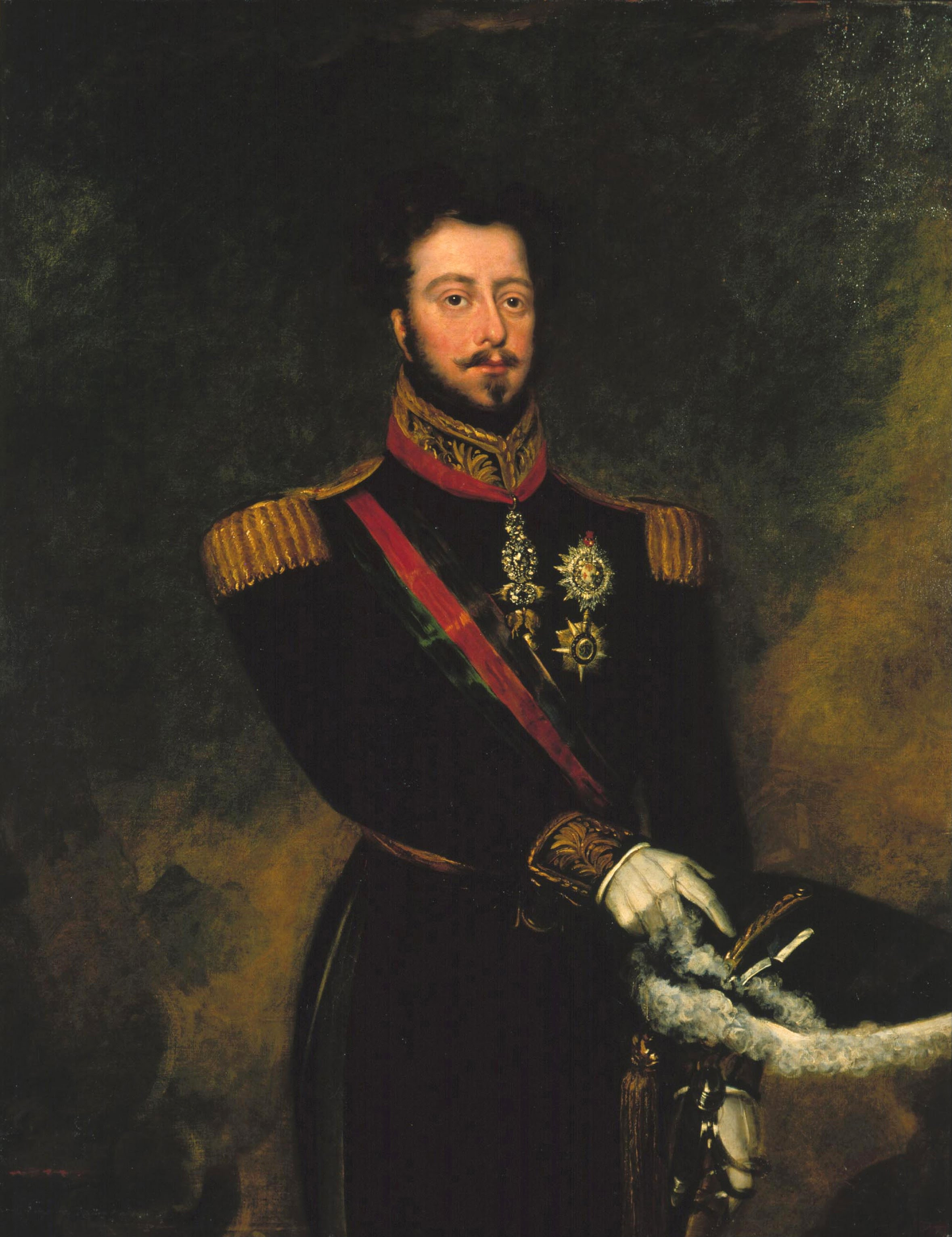
Pedro I of Brazil, 1834

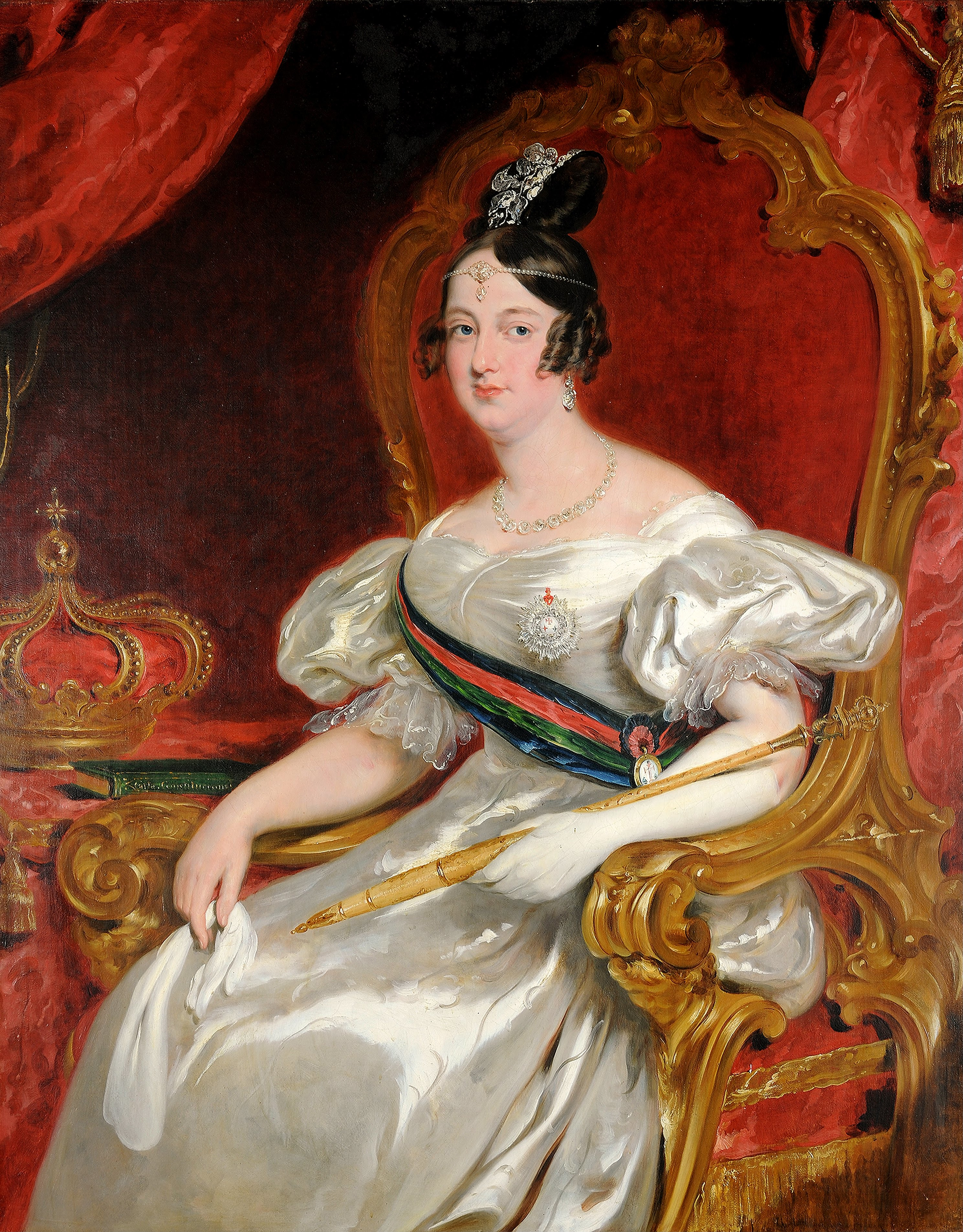
Maria II of Portugal, 1837

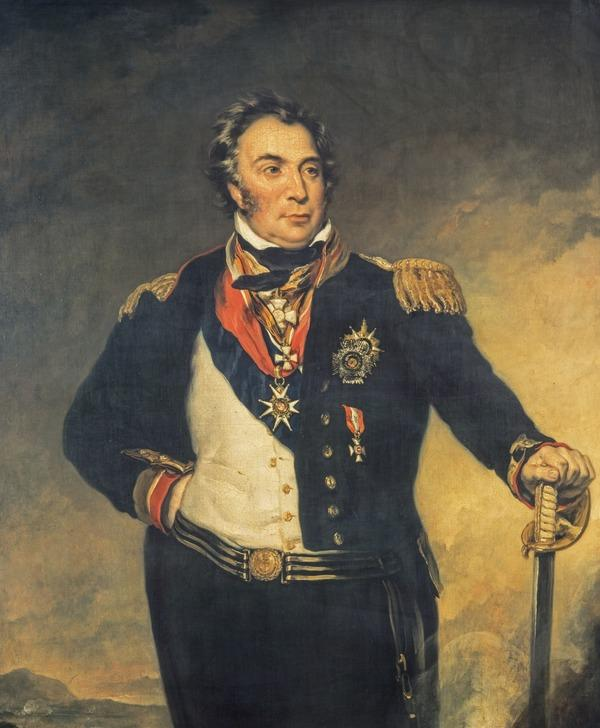
Charles Napier, 1841
