= Ira Aldridge =

American-British actor (1807–1867)

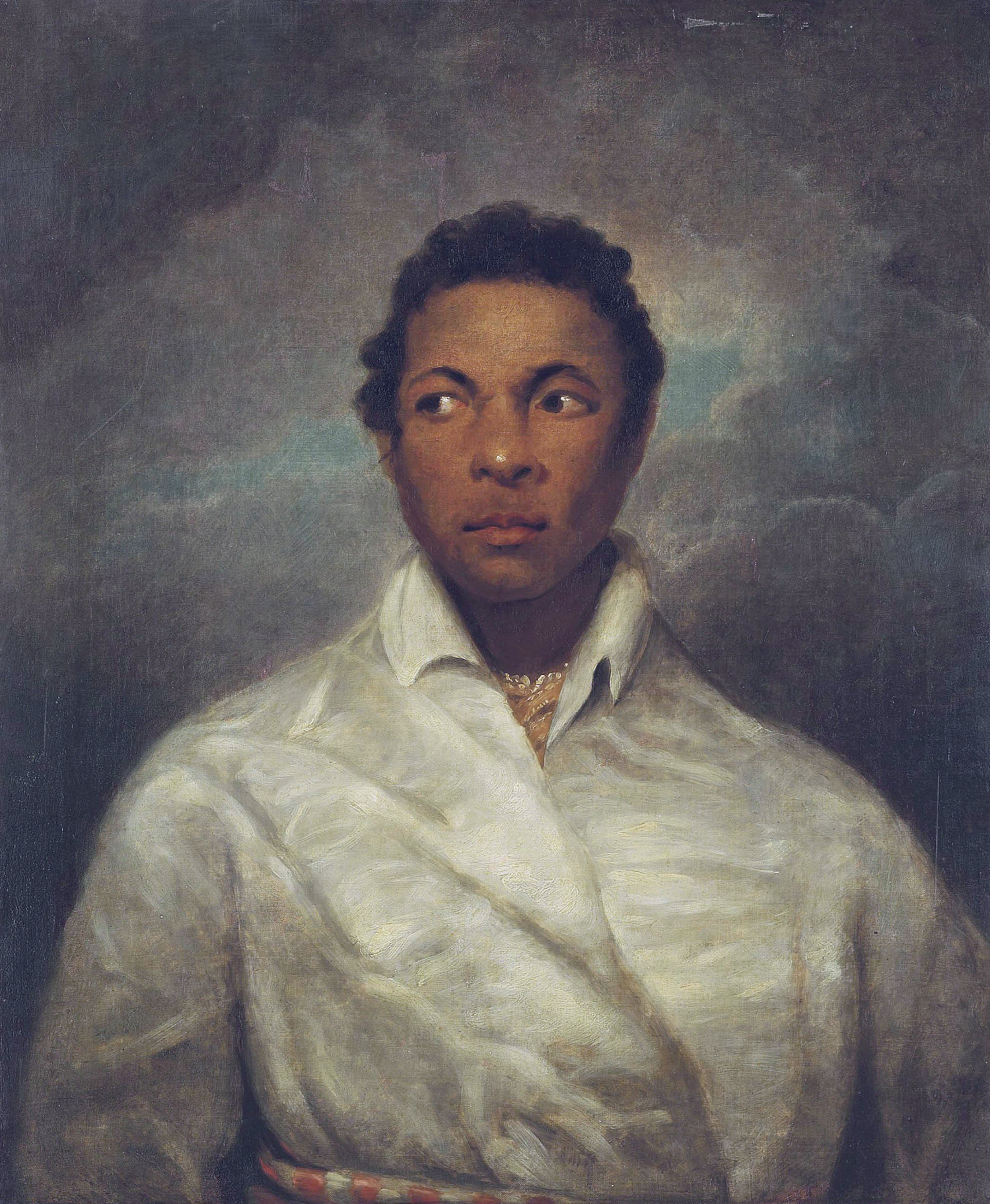
- Ira Aldridge as Othello by James Northcote, 1826
- Born: July 24, 1807; New York City, U.S.
- Died: August 7, 1867 (aged 60); Łódź, Congress Poland
- Burial place: Old Łódź Cemetery, Poland
- Citizenship: United States, United Kingdom
- Occupations: Actor; playwright
- Years active: 1820s–1867
- Spouses: Margaret Gill (m. 1825; died 1864); Amanda von Brandt (m. 1865)
- Children: 5, including Amanda and Luranah

Ira Frederick Aldridge (July 24, 1807 – August 7, 1867) was an American-born British actor, playwright, and theatre manager, known for his portrayal of Shakespearean characters. James Hewlett and Aldridge are regarded as the first Black American tragedians.

Born in New York City, Aldridge's first professional acting experience was in the early 1820s with the African Grove Theatre troupe. Facing discrimination in America, he left in 1824 for England and made his debut at London's Royal Coburg Theatre. As his career grew, his performances of Shakespeare's classics eventually met with critical acclaim and he subsequently became the manager of Coventry's Coventry Theatre Royal. From 1852, Aldridge regularly toured much of Continental Europe and received top honours from several heads of state. He died suddenly while on tour in Poland and was buried with honours in Łódź.

Aldridge is the only actor of African-American descent honoured with a bronze plaque at the Shakespeare Memorial Theatre in Stratford-upon-Avon. Two of Aldridge's daughters, Amanda and Luranah, became professional opera singers.

== Early life and career ==
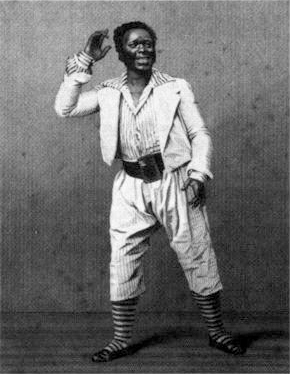
Ira Aldridge as Mungo in The Padlock.

Aldridge was born in New York City, in the United States, to The Reverend Daniel and Luranah (also spelled Lurona) Aldridge on July 24, 1807, but a few early biographies state that he was born in Bel Air, Maryland. At the age of 13, Aldridge went to the African Free School in New York City, established by the New-York Manumission Society for the children of free black people and slaves. They were given a classical education, including English grammar, writing, mathematics, geography, and astronomy. His classmates at the school included James McCune Smith, Alexander Crummell, Charles L. Reason, George T. Downing, and Henry H. Garnet.

Aldridge's first professional acting experience was in the early 1820s with the African Company, a group founded and managed by William Henry Brown and James Hewlett. In 1821, the group built the African Grove Theatre, the first resident African-American theatre in the United States. The short-lived company was the subject of protests by neighbors, attacks by a rival company, and a racist parody published by newspaper editor and Sheriff of New York Mordecai Manuel Noah. This hostility indicated few prospects for Aldridge's acting career in America. Aldridge made his acting debut as Rolla, a Peruvian character in Richard Brinsley Sheridan's Pizarro. He may have also played the male lead in Romeo and Juliet, as reported later in an 1860 memoir by his schoolfellow, Dr. James McCune Smith.

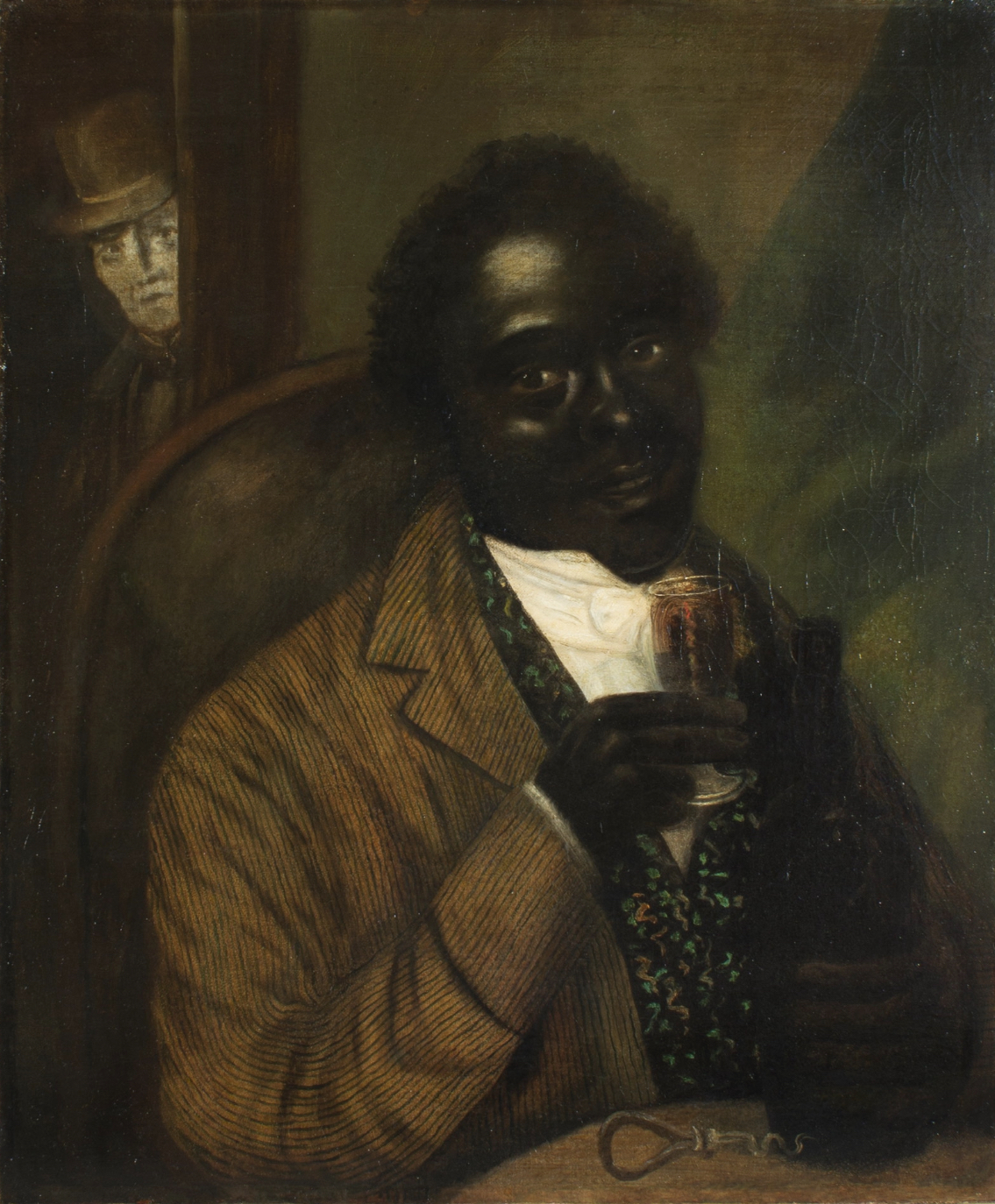
Portrait of Aldridge as Mungo, held at the Northwestern University.

Confronted with the persistent discrimination which black actors had to endure in the United States, Aldridge emigrated to Liverpool, England, in 1824 with actor James Wallack. During this time the Industrial Revolution had begun, bringing about radical economic change that helped expand the development of theatres. The British parliament had abolished slavery in the UK in the 11th century, had outlawed the Atlantic slave trade and was moving toward abolishing slavery in the British Empire, which increased the prospect of black actors from abroad looking to perform.

Having limited onstage experience and lacking popular recognition, Aldridge concocted a story of his African lineage, claiming to have descended from the Fulani princely line. By 1831, Aldridge had temporarily taken the name of Keene, a homonym for the then popular British actor, Edmund Kean. Aldridge observed a common theatrical practice of assuming an identical or similar name to that of a celebrity in order to garner attention. In addition to being called F. W. Keene Aldridge, he would later be called African Roscius, after the famous Roman actor of the first century BCE.

In May 1825, at the age of 17, Aldridge first appeared on the London stage in a low profile production of Othello. On October 10, 1825, Aldridge made a much more high-profile debut at London's Royal Coburg Theatre, and became the first African-American actor to establish himself professionally in a foreign country. He played the lead role of Oroonoko in The Revolt of Surinam, or A Slave's Revenge; this play was an adaptation of Thomas Southerne's Oroonoko (itself adapted from Aphra Behn's original work).

According to the scholar Shane White, British theatre audiences had heard of New York's African Theatre because of actor and comedian Charles Mathews. Mathews had recently produced a popular comedic lampoon of what he imagined the African Theater was like (he had never actually been). Bernth Lindfors stated:

[W]hen Aldridge starts appearing on the stage at the Royalty Theatre, he's just called a gentleman of color. But when he moves over to the Royal Coburg, he's advertised in the first playbill as the American Tragedian from the African Theater New York City. The second playbill refers to him as "The African Tragedian". So everybody goes to the theater expecting to laugh because this is the man they think Mathews saw in New York City.

An innovation Aldridge introduced early in his career was a direct address to the audience on the closing night of his engagement at a given theatre. Aldridge would speak to the audience on a variety of social issues which affected the United States, Europe and Africa. In particular, Aldridge spoke on his pro-abolitionist sentiments, for which he was widely celebrated. Aldridge's abolitionist work went hand in hand with his membership in Prince Hall Freemasonry.

== Critical reception ==
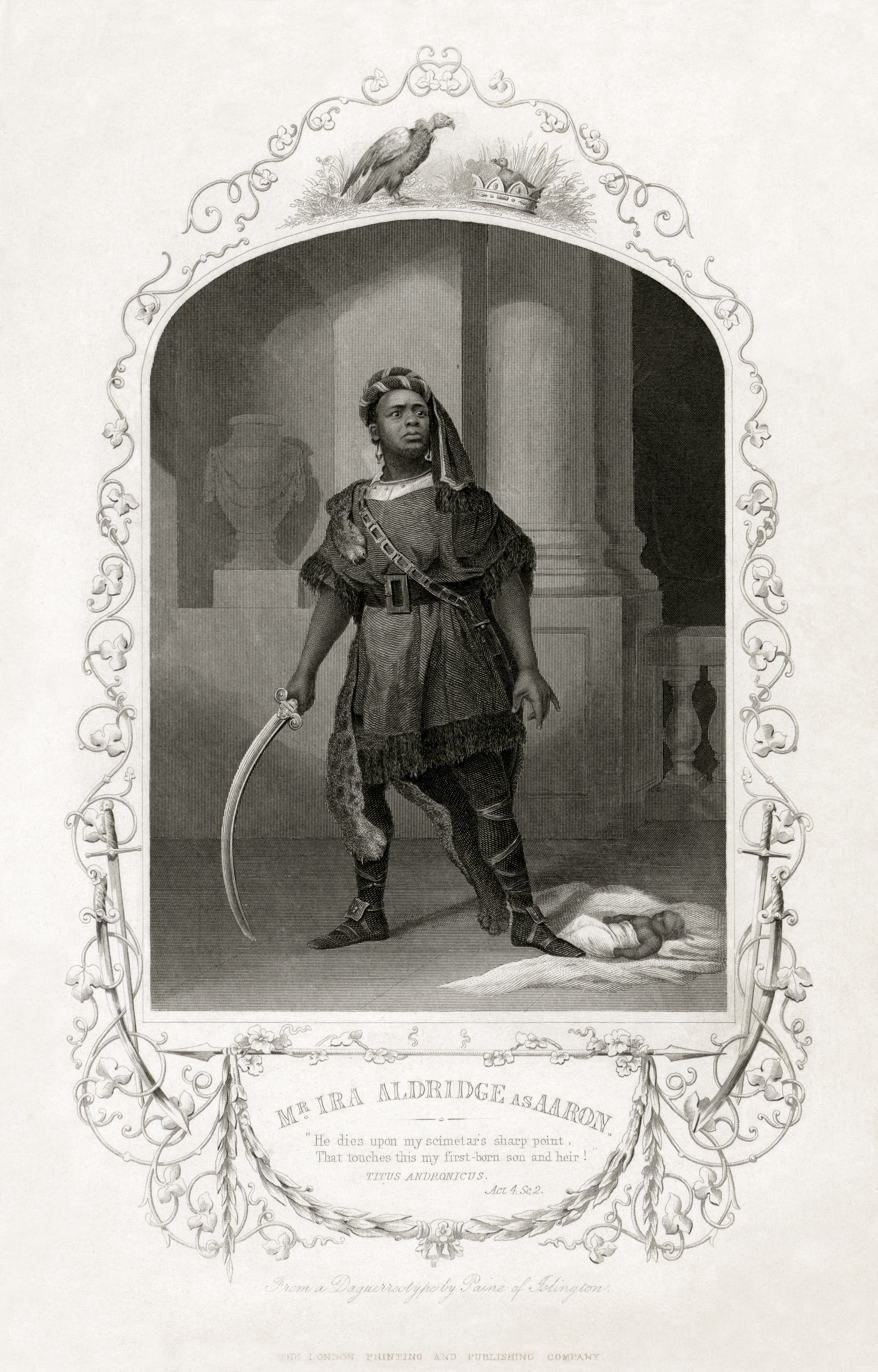
Aldridge as Aaron in Titus Andronicus

During Aldridge's seven-week engagement at the Royal Coburg, the young actor starred in five plays. He earned admiration from his audiences while critics emphasized Aldridge's lack of formal stage training and experience. According to modern critics Errol Hill and James Vernon Hatch, early reviews were mixed. For The Times he was "baker-kneed and narrow-chested with lips so shaped that it is utterly impossible for him to pronounce English"; The Globe found his conception of Oroonoko to be very judicious and his enunciation distinct and sonorous; and The Drama described him as "tall and tolerably well proportioned with a weak voice that gabbles apace." The Times critic also found fault with Aldridge's "copper" complexion, considering it insufficiently dark for Othello. Meanwhile, The Athenaeum magazine was scandalized by a black man with white actresses, and the paper Figaro in London sought to "drive him from the stage" because of his color.

Aldridge performed scenes from Othello that impressed reviewers. One critic wrote, "In Othello [Aldridge] delivers the most difficult passages with a degree of correctness that surprises the beholder." He gradually progressed to larger roles; by 1825, he had top billing at London's Coburg Theatre as Oronoko in A Slave's Revenge, soon to be followed by the role of Gambia in The Slave, and the title role of Shakespeare's Othello. He also played major roles in plays such as The Castle Spectre and The Padlock. In search of new and suitable material, Aldridge also appeared occasionally as white European characters, for which he would be made up with greasepaint and wig. Examples of these are Captain Dirk Hatteraick and Bertram in Rev. R. C. Maturin's Bertram, the title role in Shakespeare's Richard III, and Shylock in The Merchant of Venice.

== Touring, and later years ==
In 1828, Aldridge visited Coventry while he was largely touring the English provinces. After his acting impressed the people of the city, he was made the manager at Coventry Theatre Royal, owned by Sir Skears Rew, and thus became the first ever African American to manage a British theatre.

During the months when Aldridge remained in Coventry, he made various speeches about the evils of slavery. And after he left Coventry, his speeches and the impression he made, inspired the people of Coventry to go to the county hall, and petition to the Parliament, to abolish slavery.

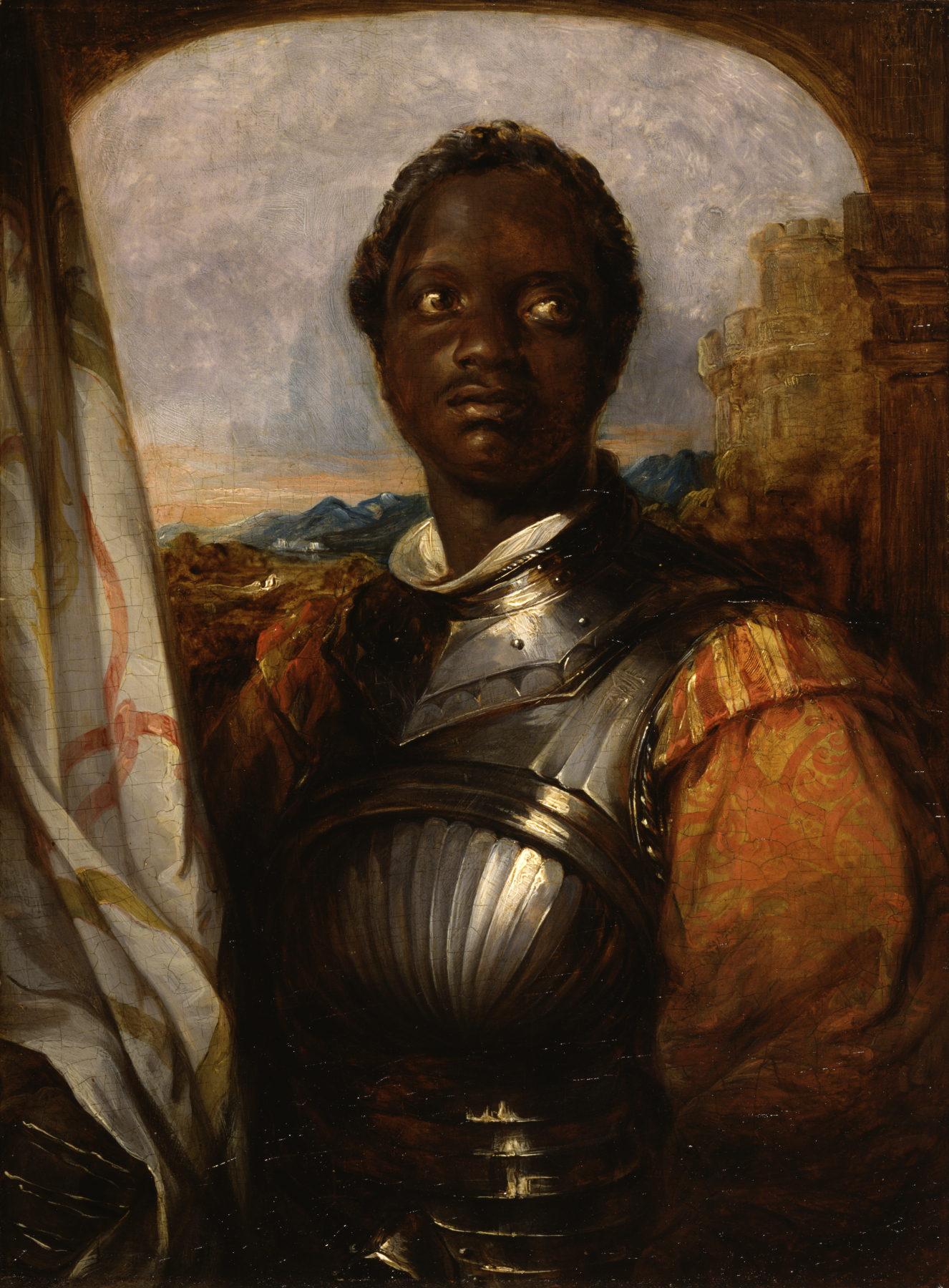
Aldridge as Othello by William Mulready, Walters Art Museum

In 1831 Aldridge successfully played in Dublin; at several locations in southern Ireland, where he created a sensation in the small towns; as well as in Bath, England and Edinburgh, Scotland. The actor Edmund Kean praised his Othello, and since he was an African-American actor from the African Theatre, The Times termed him the "African Roscius", after the famed actor of ancient Rome. Aldridge used this to his benefit and expanded African references in his biography that appeared in playbills, also identifying his birthplace as "Africa" in his entry in the 1851 census.

By at least 1833 he had added the anti-heroic role of Zanga in Edward Young's The Revenge to his repertoire. The Revenge (1721) race-flips the plot of Othello by showing how Zanga, a captured Moorish prince who has become the servant and confidant of the noble Don Alonzo, vengefully tricks him into believing his wife is unfaithful. Alonzo finally kills himself and Zanga exults: "Let Europe and her pallid sons go weep; / Let Afric and her hundred thrones rejoice: / Oh, my dear countrymen, look down and see / How I bestride your prostrate conqueror!" An illustrated review of this performance at the Surrey Theatre shows Aldridge triumphing over Alonzo, dressed in flowing Moorish robes, which, according to the critic, "reminds one of the portraits of Abd-el Kader". The same reviewer praised Aldridge's comic talents in the contrasting role of Mungo (in the Bickerstaffe farce The Padlock), describing them as a refreshing corrective, "...differing entirely from the Ethiopian absurdities we have been taught to look upon as correct portraitures; his total abandon is very amusing."

During the 1840s, Aldridge performed across towns in Northumberland, performing in Alnwick in 1843 and Berwick-upon-Tweed in 1840, 1843 and 1849.

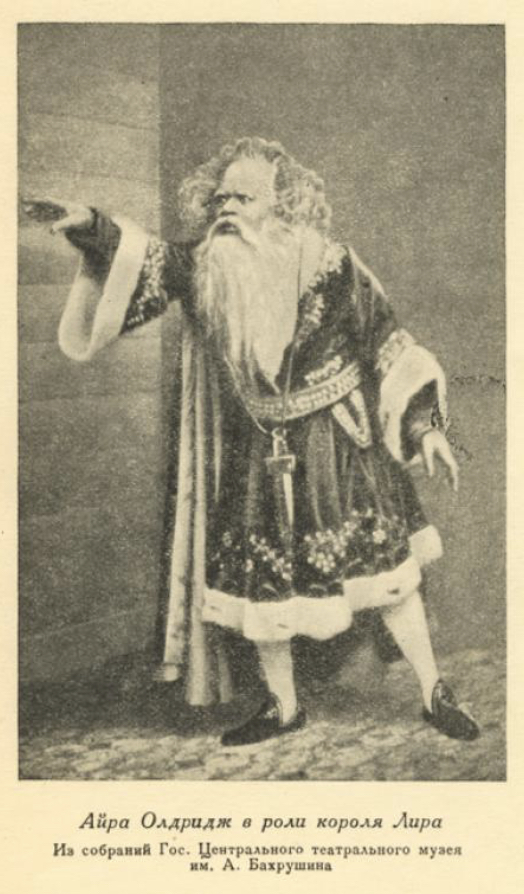
Aldridge as King Lear

In 1841, Aldridge toured towns across Lincolnshire, performing in Gainsborough, Grantham, Spilsby, and Horncastle. In 1842, Aldridge performed in Lincoln; local newspapers reported that his arrival in a travelling coach was a remarkable sight and caused a stir with inhabitants of the city. Despite the eye-catching arrival, Aldridge's performances were not well attended. In June 1844 he made appearances on stage in Exmouth (Devon, England). In 1847, he performed in Boston. Aldridge returned to Lincoln in 1849 to favourable reviews. The Lincoln Standard reported on Aldridge's performance, “his talents are first rate, and his conduct gentlemanly, strongly evidencing that mankind all have an equal capacity, if they had but the opportunity of receiving instruction.”

In 1852, Aldridge chose Brussels in Belgium as the starting point of its first tour in continental and central Europe. He toured with successes all over Europe. He had particular success in Prussia, where he was presented to the Duchess of Saxe-Coburg-Gotha, and performed for William IV of Prussia; he also performed in Budapest. An 1858 tour took him to Serbia and to the Russian Empire, where he became acquainted with Count Fyodor Tolstoy, Mikhail Shchepkin and Ukrainian poet and artist Taras Shevchenko, who did his portrait in pastel. He introduced and increased interest in Shakespeare in some areas of Central Europe, and in Poland in particular. As an African American in the age of slavery, he became for some an identifying symbol also for the oppressed of Poland, drawing surveillance by the Russian government.

Now of an appropriate age, about this time, he played the title role of King Lear (in England) for the first time. He purchased some property in England, toured Russia again (1862), and applied for British citizenship (1863). Shortly before his death he was apparently ready to return to America to perform. It was reported that Aldridge had negotiated a 100-show-tour throughout the post-Civil War United States. In its obituary of Aldridge, The New York Times stated he had been booked to appear in the city's Academy of Music in September, but "Death has prevented the fulfilment of his intention". His funeral in Łódź, where he died unexpectedly, was accompanied by an elaborate procession, with the Art Society carrying his medals and awards through the streets, and his large tomb in the city cemetery was covered in flowers.

== Marriage and family ==
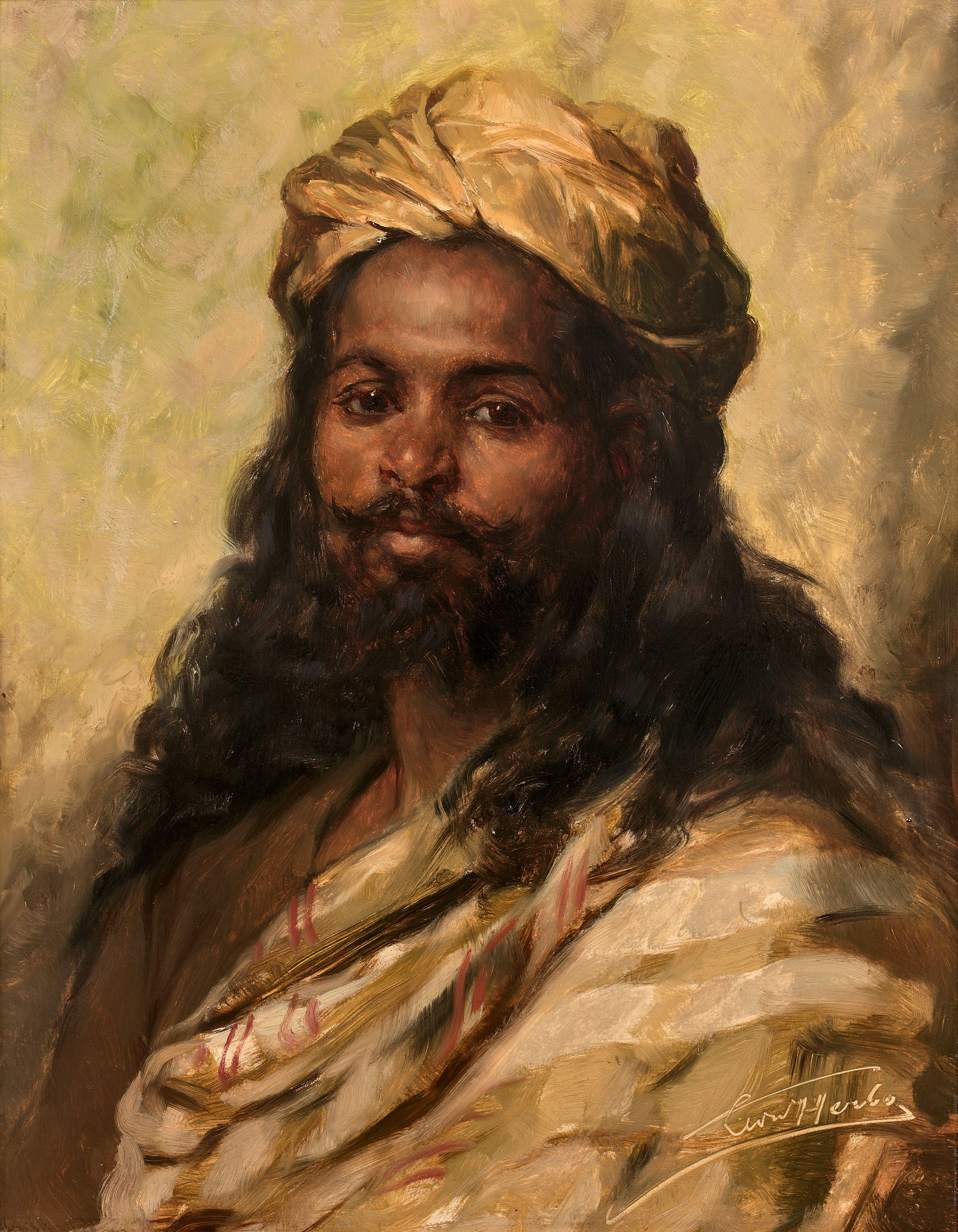
Portrait as Othello in oil painting by Léon Herbo (1850-1907)

Soon after going to England, on 27 November 1825, Aldridge married Margaret Gill, an Englishwoman, at St George's, Bloomsbury. He recorded in his Memoir that she was "the natural daughter of a member of Parliament, and a man of high standing in the county of Berks", but her father was in reality a stocking-weaver from Northallerton, Yorkshire. Lindfors suggests that Aldridge "may have invented this fiction to give her an air of respectability in polite society", raising her social status to protect her from criticism for marrying a black man. Their marriage angered the pro-slavery lobby, which attempted to end Aldridge's career. The couple was married for 40 years until her death in 1864.

Aldridge's first son, Ira Daniel, was born in May 1847. The identity of his mother is unknown, but it could not have been Margaret Aldridge, who was 49 years old and had been in ill health for years. She raised Ira Daniel as her own; they shared a loving relationship until her death. He emigrated to Australia in February 1867.

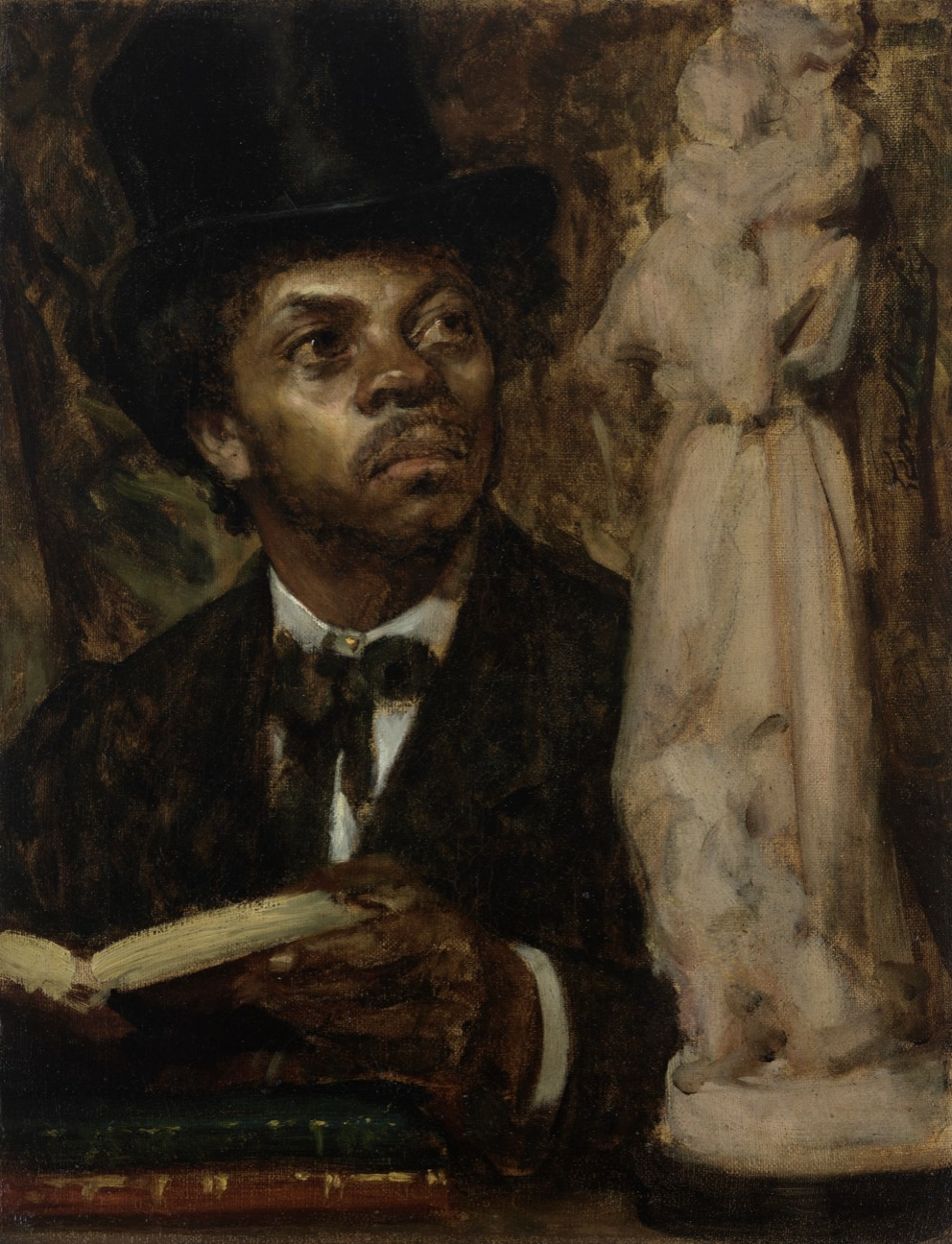
Portrait in oil painting by Léon Herbo (1850–1907)

Aldridge bought 5 Hamlet Road, in the prosperous suburbs of Upper Norwood, London, in 1861–62 shortly before becoming a naturalised British citizen in 1863. It was where his wife, Margaret, and later his second wife, Amanda, brought up his children. He named the house ‘Luranah Villa’ in memory of his mother. It now bears his English Heritage blue plaque.

A year after Margaret's death, on April 20, 1865, Aldridge married his mistress, the self-styled Swedish countess Amanda von Brandt (1834–1915). They had four children: Irene Luranah, Ira Frederick and Amanda Aldridge, who all went on to musical careers, the two girls as opera singers. Their daughter Rachael Frederica was born shortly after Aldridge's death and died in infancy. Brandt died in 1915 and is buried at Highgate Woods, London.

Aldridge spent most of his final years with his family in Russia and continental Europe, interspersed with occasional visits to England. He planned to return to the post-Civil-War United States. After completing a 70-city tour of France in 1867 and his French tour of Belgium (Ghent and Brussels), Aldridge died of a prolonged lung condition on 7 August 1867 while visiting Łódź in Congress Poland. He was buried in the city's Old Evangelical Cemetery; 23 years passed before a proper tombstone was erected. His grave is tended by the Society of Polish Artists of Film and Theatre. A commemorative plaque was unveiled in 2014 at 175 Piotrkowska Street, where Aldridge was said to have died. The plaque was created by sculptor Marian Konieczny.

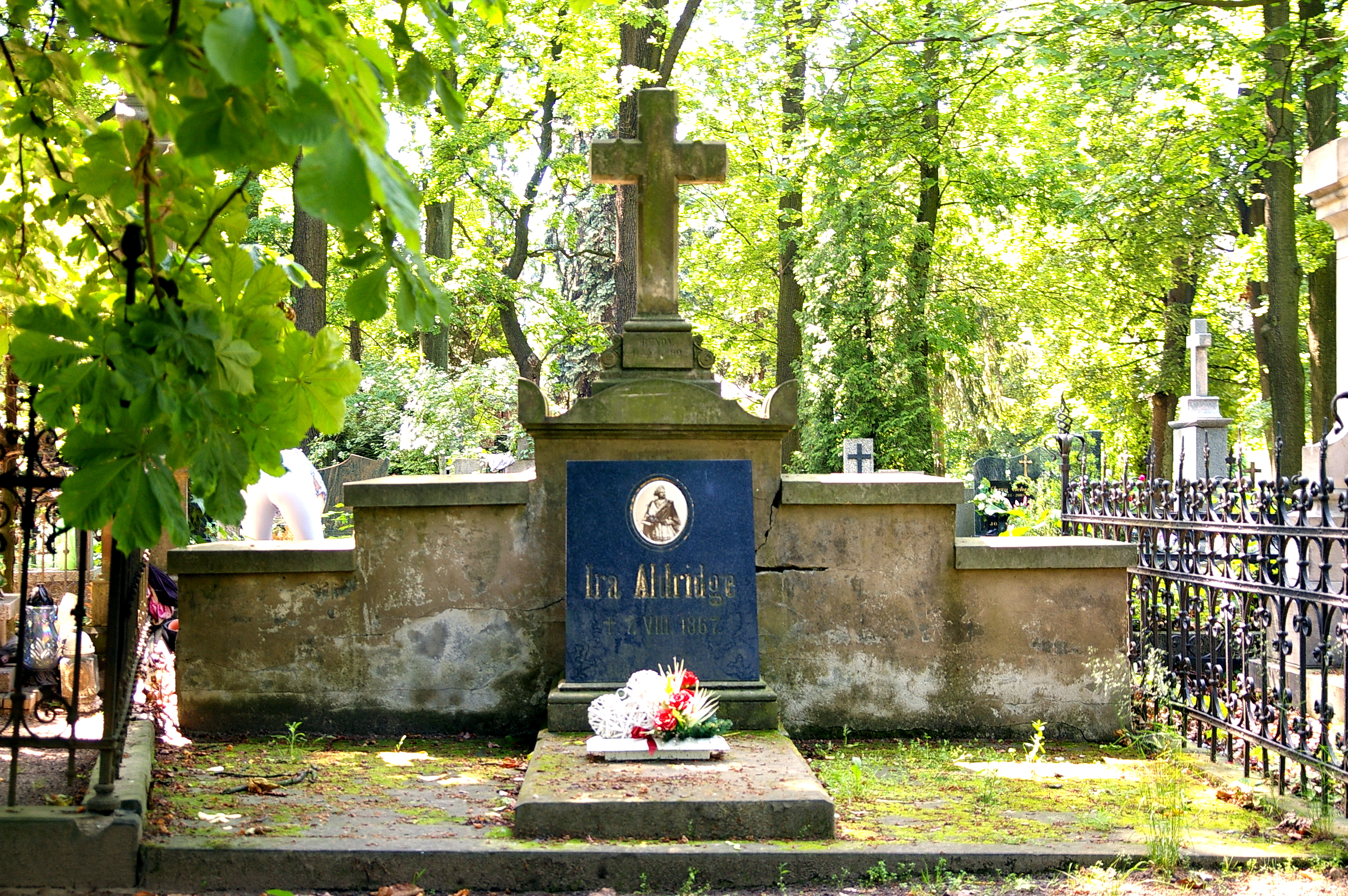
Aldridge's tomb in Łódź, Poland.

A half-length portrait painted in 1826 by James Northcote shows Aldridge dressed for the role of Othello, but in a relatively undramatic portrait pose, is on display at the Manchester Art Gallery (in the Manchester section). Aldridge performed in the city many times. A blue plaque unveiled in 2007 commemorates Aldridge at 5 Hamlet Road in Upper Norwood, London. The plaque describes him as the "African Roscius".

== The case of Stothard v. Aldridge ==
In 1856 Aldridge was successfully sued by actor William Stothard, who alleged Aldridge had had an affair with his wife Emma three years before, resulting in the birth of a son. (Under English law at the time the husband of an adulterous wife was entitled to sue her lover for compensation.) At a hearing on January 14 in London before Mr. Justice Erle the jury found for the plaintiff Stothard, but in view of mitigating circumstances awarded him only £2 in damages.

Aldridge was away on tour in Ireland when the trial took place but he was heading the bill at a London theatre by the following year, indicating the scandal caused his career no lasting damage.

== Ira Aldridge Troupe ==
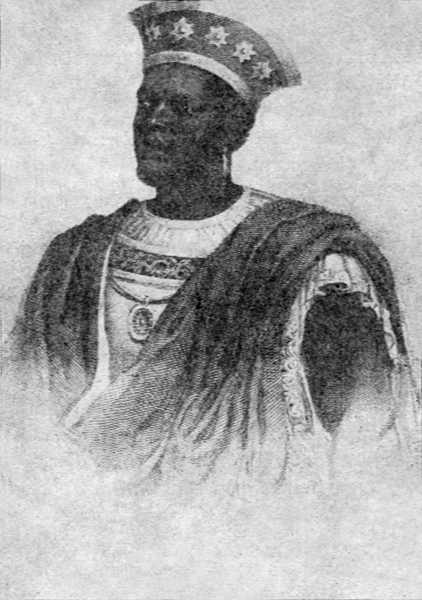
As Othello in Poland, 1860

Aldridge enjoyed enormous fame as a tragic actor during his lifetime, but after his death, he was soon forgotten (in Europe). The news of Ira Aldridge's death in Poland and the record of his achievement as an actor reached the American black community slowly. In African-American circles, Aldridge was a legendary figure. Many black actors viewed him as an inspirational model, so when his death was revealed, several amateur groups sought to honor his memory by adopting his name for their companies.

Many troupes were being founded in various places around America. In the late nineteenth century Aldridge-titled troupes were established in Washington, DC, in Philadelphia, and in New Haven, their respective productions at the time being an adaptation of Kotzebue's Die Spanier in Peru by Sheridan as Pizarro in 1883, School by Thomas William Robertson in 1885, and George Melville Baker's Comrades in 1889.

The most prominent troupe named for him was the Ira Aldridge Troupe in Philadelphia, founded in 1863, some 35 years after Aldridge left the US for good. The Ira Aldridge Troupe was a minstrelsy group that caricatured Irish men. The Ira Aldridge Troupe is unique in annals of minstrelsy; it was named for a Black actor who had left his homeland some 35 years before and achieved fame in Europe. Unlike most, later, Black minstrel companies, the Aldridge Troupe apparently did not do plantation material, although they were billed as a 'contraband troupe'—that is, fugitive slaves. Perhaps because of their substantially Black audience, the troupe felt no need to "put on the mask." Although much of the material the group performed was standard fare, several of the company's acts were downright subversive.

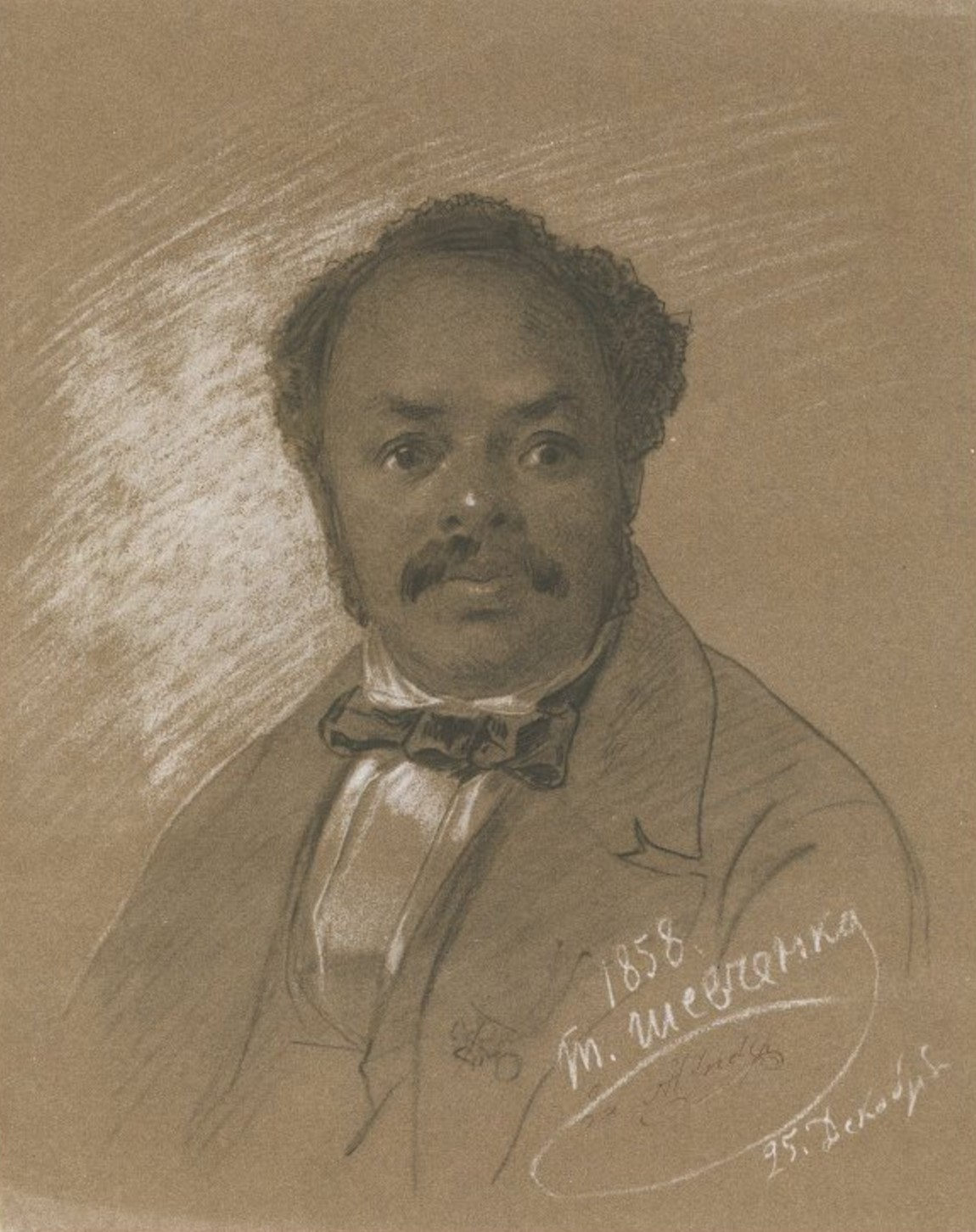
Portrait in pastel, by Taras Shevchenko, 1858

The Ira Aldridge Troupe appearing during the American Civil War made it "unique in the annals of minstrelsy." The Clipper (New York City) thought it was important enough to review; and it performed before a mixed audience, at a time when often white and black audiences were separated. Third, it was a black troupe presenting a program designed to appeal to their black audience. The Ira Aldridge Troupe performances eschewed the southern genre of old "darkies" longing for the plantation. The exclusion of southern nostalgia may have been in deference to a majority-black audience. The New York Clipper reported them as "A more incorrigible set of cusses we never saw; they beat our Bowery gods all to pieces."

The troupe also created performances and songs that referred to the continuing Civil War. A ballad, "When the Cruel War is Over", became well known; it was performed by three members of the troupe—Miss S. Burton, Miss R. Clark, and Mr. C. Nixon. The song sold over a million copies of sheet music and was one of the most popular sentimental songs of the Civil War. The song describes a soldier's farewell to his lady, the wounds he receives in battle, and his dying request for a last caress. The song, highly popular with white minstrel groups, was an example of the change in white minstrelsy that had been occurring at this time.

Another popular production was a farce called The Irishman and the Stranger, with a Mr. Brown playing a character called Pat O'Callahan and a Mr. Jones playing the Stranger. This farce displayed black actors in white face speaking in a "nigger accent". The Clipper reporter referred to the performance as a "truly laughable affair, the 'Irish nagur' mixing up a rich Irish brogue promiscuously with the sweet nigger accent". Perhaps the Aldridge Troupe's audience got its biggest satisfaction, however, from the role reversal inherent in the piece: since the beginning of minstrelsy, minstrels of Irish heritage, such as Dan Bryant and Richard Hooley, had been caricaturing Black men—now it was the turn of Black men to caricature the Irish.

The history of minstrelsy also shows the cross-cultural influences, with Whites adopting elements of Black culture. The Ira Aldridge Troupe tried to pirate that piracy, and, in collaboration with its audience, turn minstrelsy to its own ends.

== Aldridge family ==
- Ira Daniel Aldridge, 1847–?. Teacher; convicted forger. Migrated to Australia in 1867.
- Irene Luranah Pauline Aldridge, 1860–1932. Opera singer.
- Ira Frederick Olaff Aldridge, 1862–1886. Musician and composer.
- Amanda Christina Elizabeth Aldridge (Amanda Ira Aldridge), 1866–1956. Opera singer, teacher and composer under name of Montague Ring.
- Rachael Margaret Frederika Aldridge, b. 1868; died in infancy 1869.

== Legacy and honors ==
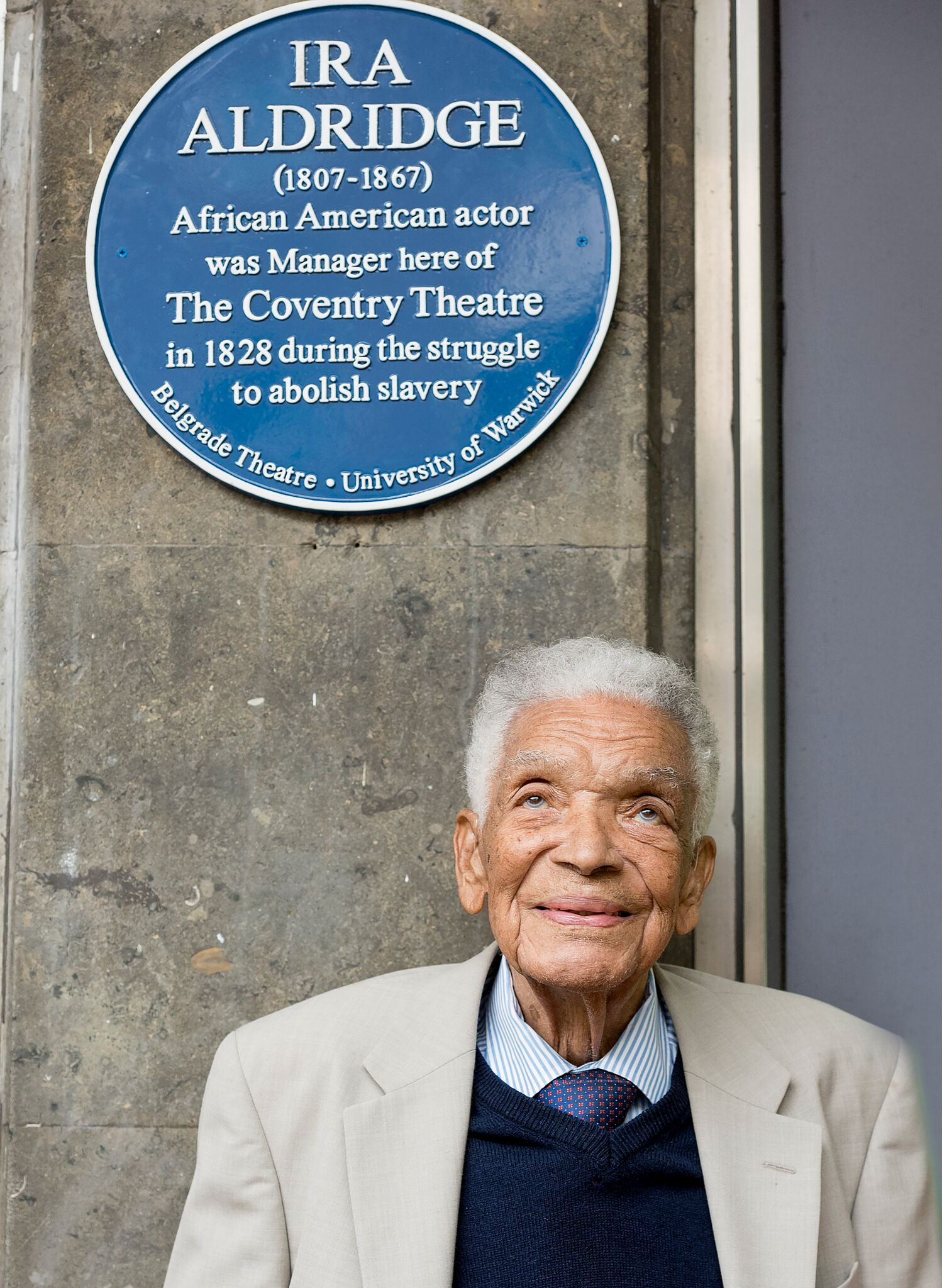
Blue plaque commemorating Ira Aldridge's theatre location in Coventry, with actor Earl Cameron, who helped unveil it on 3 August 2017

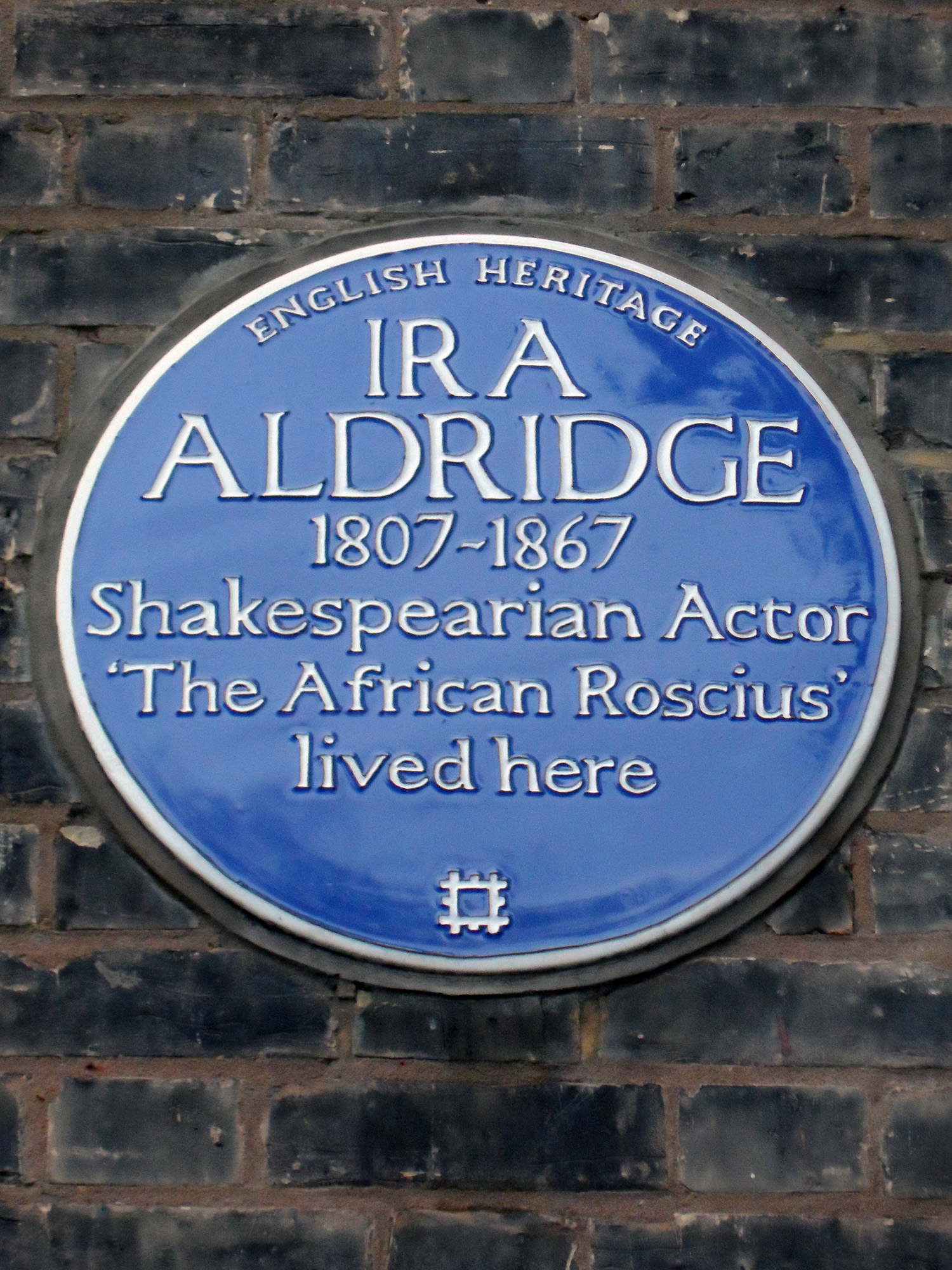
English Heritage blue plaque at 5 Hamlet Road, Upper Norwood, London

- Aldridge received awards for his art from European heads of state and governments: the Prussian Gold Medal for Arts and Sciences from King Frederick William III, the Golden Cross of Leopold from the Czar of Russia, and the Maltese Cross from Bern, Switzerland.
- During his successful tours, Aldridge had the distinguished honor of appearing before: Leopold I, King of Belgium; Frederick William IV, King of Prussia; the Prince and Princess of Prussia; Prince Frederick Wilhelm and Court; Francis Joseph I, Emperor of Austria; Sophia Archduchess of Austria; Ferdinand, Ex-Emperor of Austria; Archduke Albrecht, Viceroy of Hungary; Frederick Augustus and Maria of Saxony; the King and Queen of Holland; the Queen of Sweden; The Prince Regent of Baden; the Duke and Duchess of Saxe Cobourg; the Grand Duke of Mecklenburg Schwerin; the Reigning Duke of Brunswick; the Margrave and Margravine of Baden; and General Jellachich, Ban of Croatia, amongst others.
- Aldridge is the only African American to have a bronze plaque among the 33 actors honored at the Shakespeare Memorial Theatre at Stratford-upon-Avon.
- A bust of Ira Aldridge by Pietro Calvi sits in the Grand Saloon of the Theatre Royal Drury Lane in London.
- Aldridge's legacy inspired the dramatic writing of African-American playwright Henry Francis Downing, who in the early 20th century became "probably the first person of African descent to have a play of his or her own written and published in Britain."
- In 2002, scholar Molefi Kete Asante listed Ira Aldridge in his 100 Greatest African Americans.
- His life was the subject of a play, Red Velvet, by Lolita Chakrabarti and starring Adrian Lester, produced at the Tricycle Theatre in London in 2012. When Chakrabarti was the guest in an episode of the BBC Radio 4 programme Great Lives broadcast in April 2022, she chose Aldridge as the subject.
- Howard University Department of Theatre Arts, a historically black university in Washington, DC, has a theatre named after Ira Aldridge.
- Aldridge's Othello has been highly influential in starting a series of respected performances by African Americans in Othello in the 1800s and early 1900s, which includes: John A. Arneaux, John Hewlett, and Paul Robeson.
- A blue plaque in Aldridge's honor was erected at Coventry, England. Professor Tony Howard, who teaches in the Department of English and Comparative Literary Studies at the University of Warwick, was campaigning for the commemoration of Aldridge's time in Coventry, with the Belgrade Theatre. He had also said that, in Coventry, where there was formerly little interest in the abolition of slavery, Aldridge had "changed the climate of thinking". On 3 August 2017, a blue plaque was unveiled to honour Aldridge for his time in Coventry, and to commemorate the location of the theatre. The plaque was unveiled in the Upper Precinct in Coventry city centre, by Lord Mayor Councillor Tony Skipper and was helped by actor Earl Cameron, whose voice coach was Aldridge's daughter, Amanda Ira Aldridge.
- A blue plaque was erected in 2007 by English Heritage at 5 Hamlet Road, Upper Norwood, London SE19 2AP, London Borough of Bromley.
- In 2021, actor Merrick McCartha portrayed Aldridge in a biopic short film that he co-wrote with director Allan Wasserman.

== The Black Doctor (1847) ==
The Black Doctor, originally written in French by Auguste Anicet-Bourgeois, was adapted by Aldridge for the English stage. The Black Doctor is a romantic play about Fabian, a bi-racial physician, and his patient Pauline, the daughter of a French aristocrat. The couple falls in love and marries in secret. Although the play depicts racial and family conflict, and ends with Fabian's death, Aldridge was said to portray his title character with dignity.

== See also ==
- List of British actors
- The Captive Slave
