= Léon Herbo =

Belgian painter

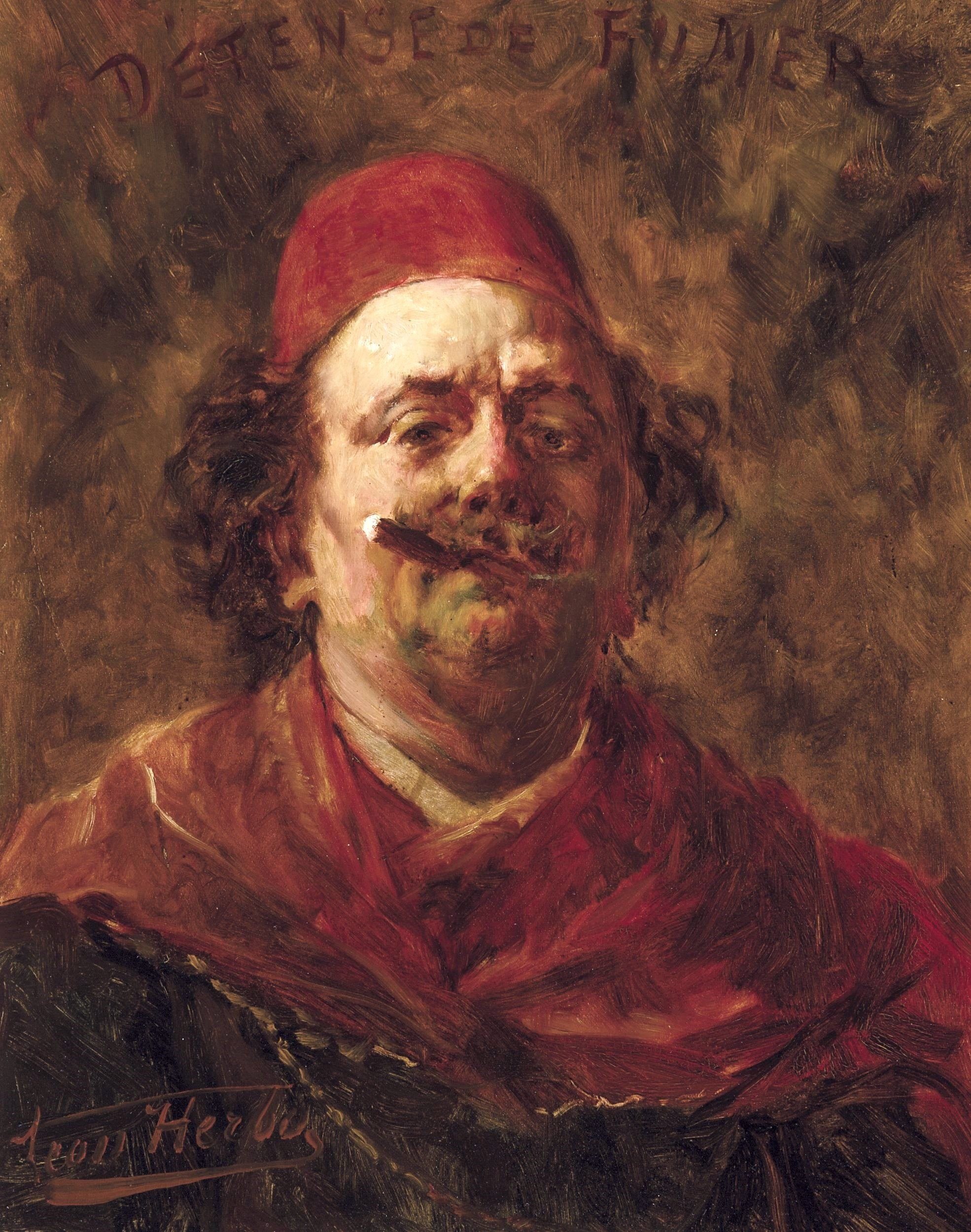
"Smoking Prohibited" (Self-portrait with Fez)

Léon Herbo (8 October 1850, Templeuve - 19 June 1907, Ixelles) was a Belgian painter, best known for his portraits of women in casual poses and for his portraits of actors and actresses. He also painted genre scenes, many with Orientalist themes. His wife often served as his model.

== Biography ==
He studied at the Académie des beaux-arts de Tournai with Léonce Legendre, the Académie's Director, and completed his studies at the Académie Royale des Beaux-Arts in Brussels from 1869 to 1874. He was ranked first in the preparatory competition for the Prix de Rome. He travelled throughout Germany, Italy and France before settling in Brussels.

His first formal exhibit came in 1875, at the Salon van Brussel, and he would continue to hold showings there until the end of the century. The following year, he was one of the co-founders of "L'Essor", a progressive group that rebelled against the conservative teachings of the Academies.

As well as exhibiting in Belgium, he participated in showings in Paris, at the Salon, in Munich and Berlin. He obtained honorable mention at the Exposition Universelle (1889). That same year, he and the animal painter, Alexandre Clarys, collaborated on creating a monumental canvas depicting the meeting of Queen Marie Henriette with the military squadron named after her.

He was very prolific and created numerous works for commercial use. Many were designed for reproduction by chromolithography, or the decoration of porcelain. Above all, he became the portrait painter at a fixed price and guaranteed likeness. "His reputation was such that he was often approached for portraits after death" (in Biographie Nationale publiée par l'Académie Royale des Sciences, des Lettres et des Beaux-Arts de Belgique (Tome 37 - pp. 432 & 433). A good example is the portrait of the Crown Prince of Belgium, Léopold Ferdinand, Count of Hainaut, who died in 1869, aged ten, a portrait he painted for Queen Marie-Henriette. Herbo had an important production as a portrait painter. We owe him more than a thousand portraits.

Most of his paintings are in private collections. Some may be seen at the Royal Museums of Fine Arts of Belgium, the Museum of Painting and Sculpture in Kortrijk, and the Musée des Beaux-Arts Tournai.

== Selected paintings ==
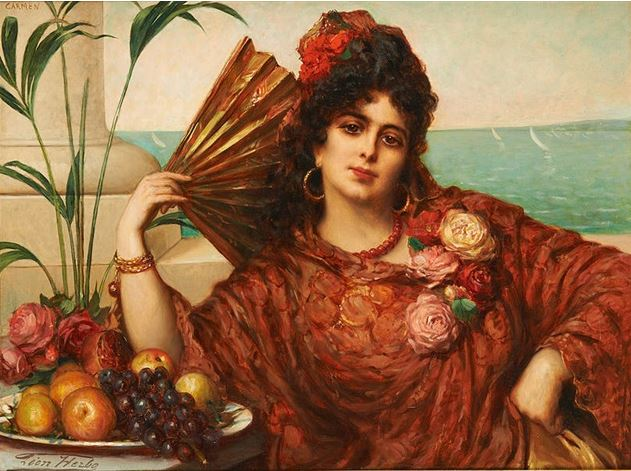
Carmen

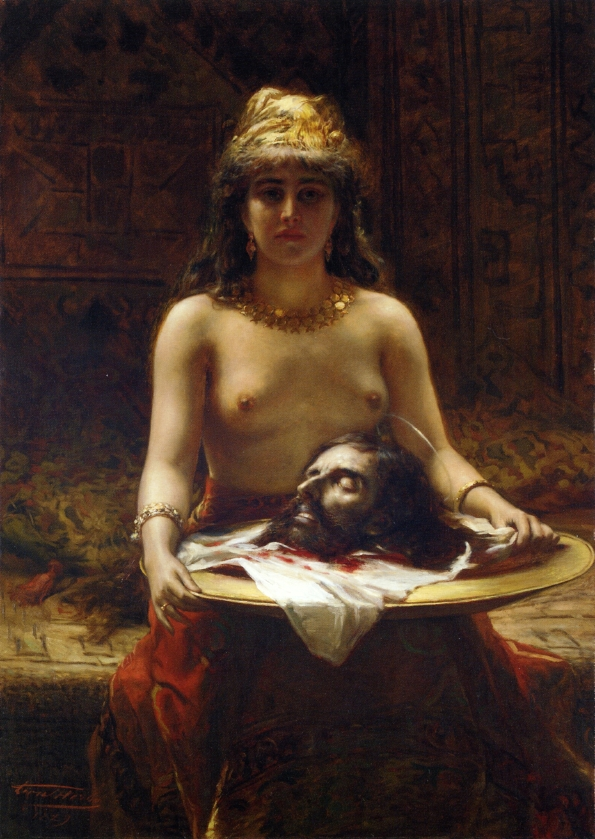
Salome

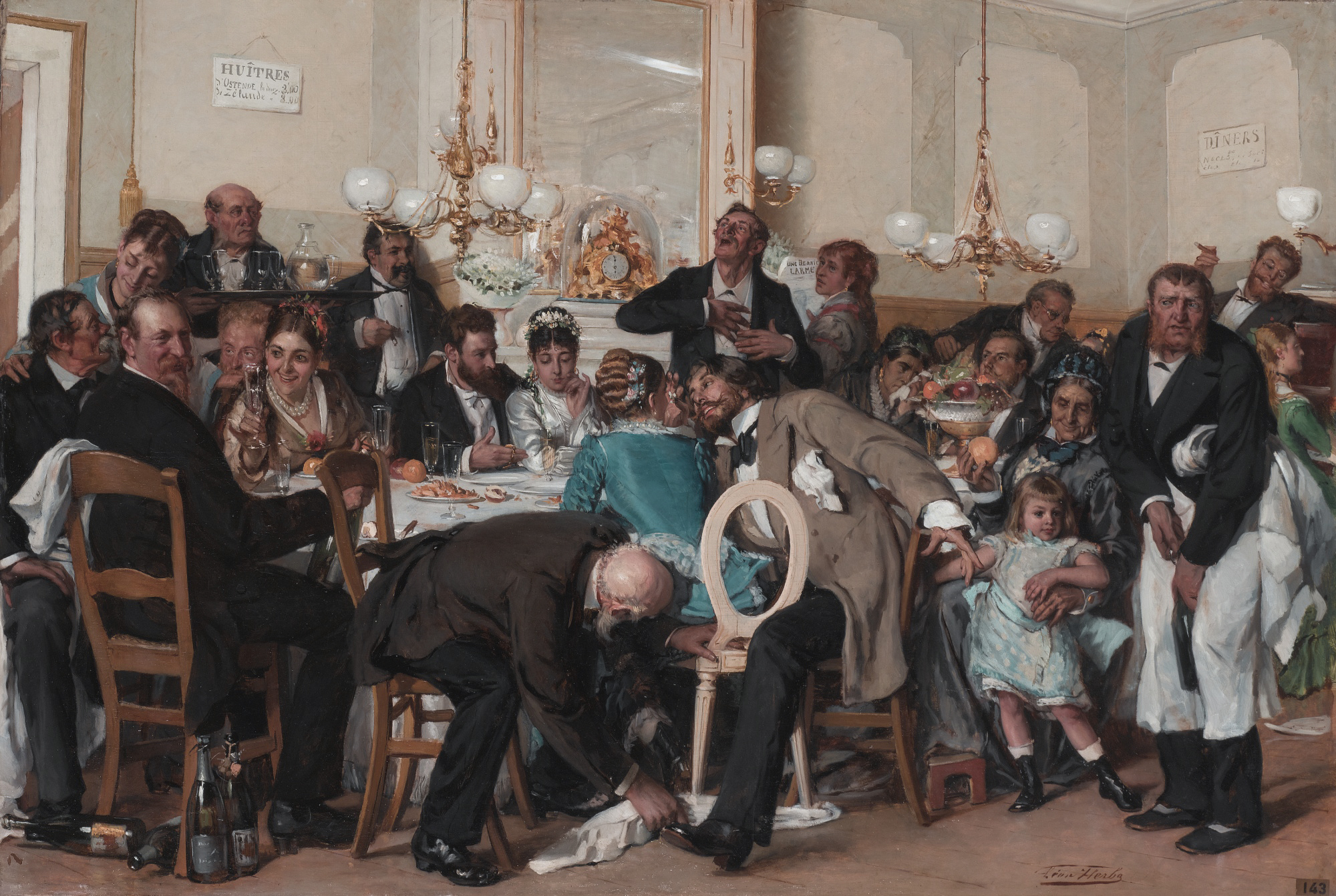
The Wedding Feast

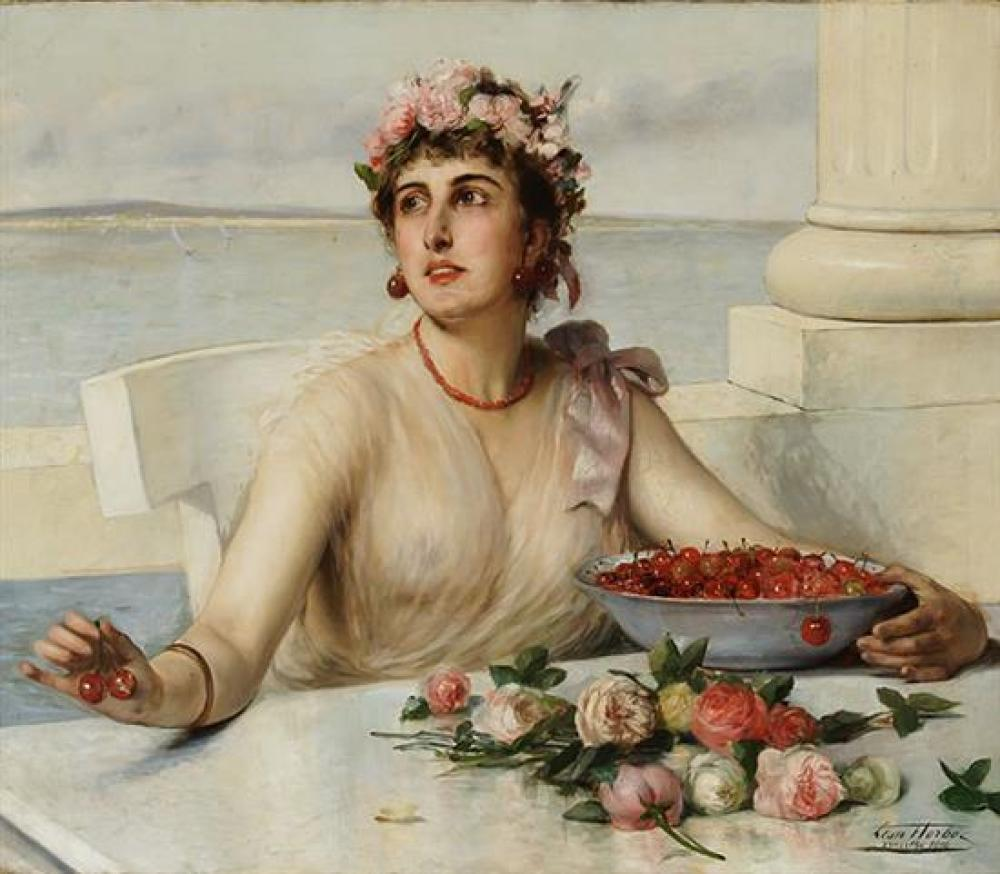
Springtime

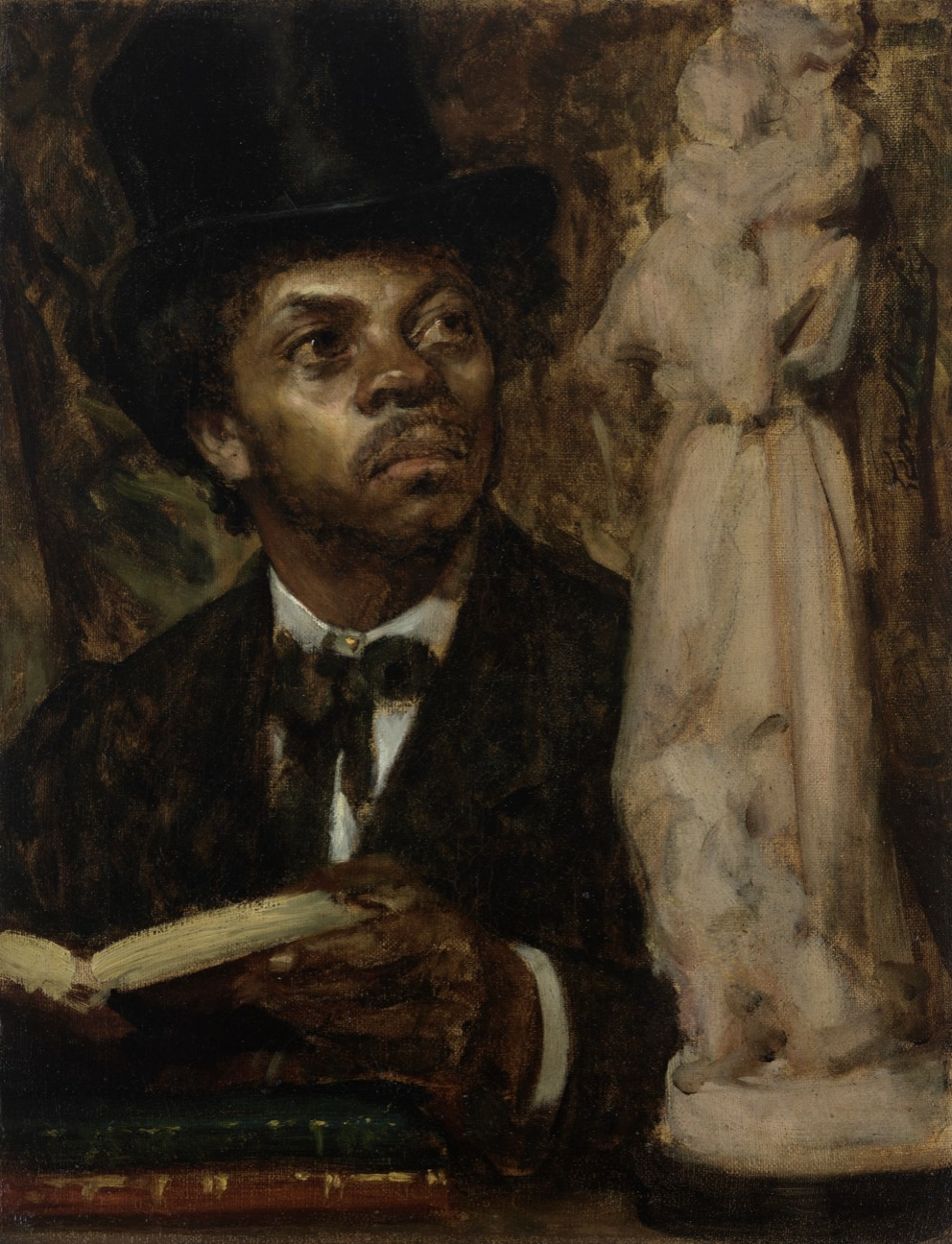
Portrait of Ira Aldridge

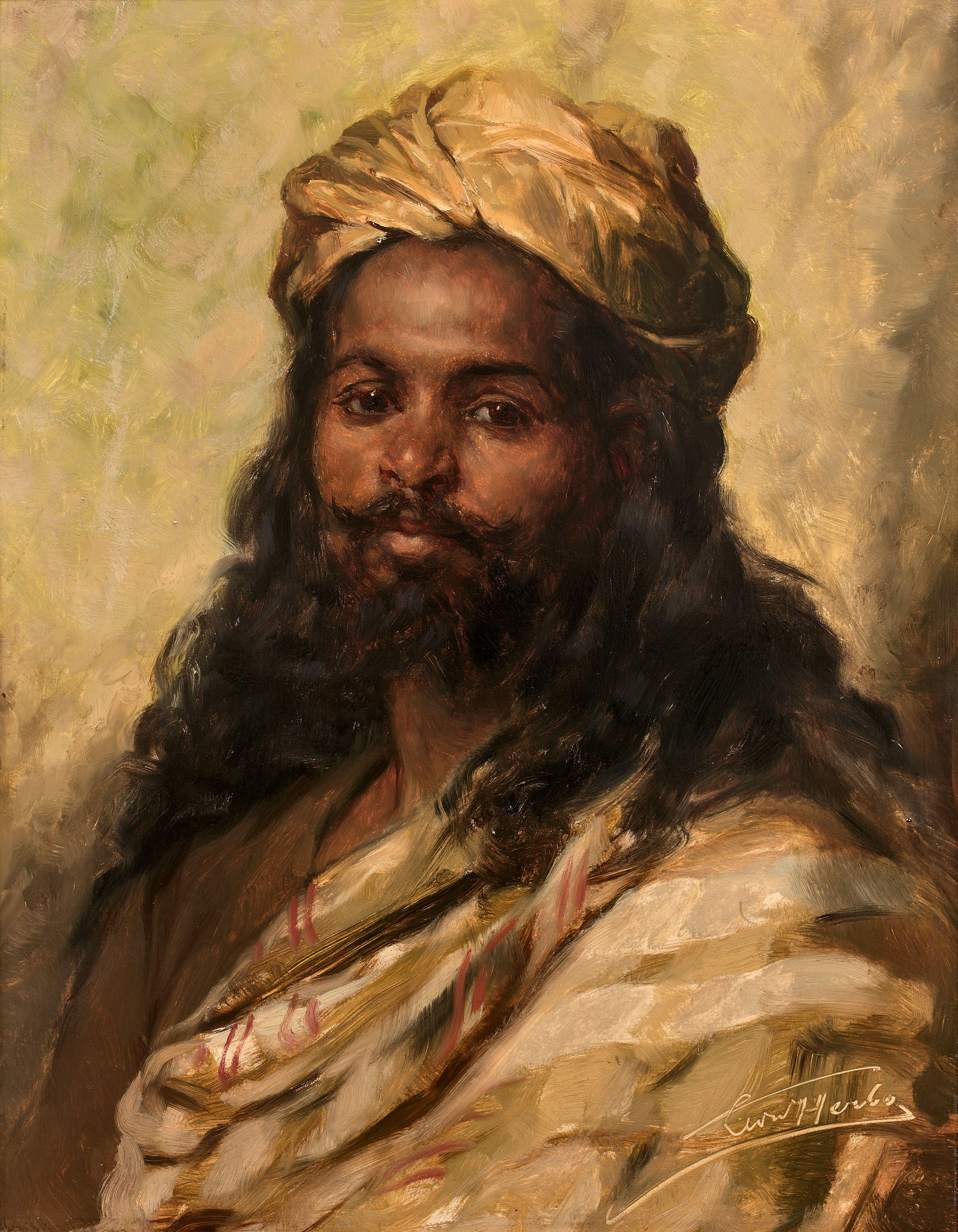
Portrait of Ira Aldridge as Othello (auction at Artcurial Paris March 23, 2022)

== Sources ==
- Biography @ the Dictionnaire des peintres belges
- Biographie Nationale de Belgique, Vol.37, pg.432-433 Online
