= Luranah Aldridge =

British opera singer (1860–1932)

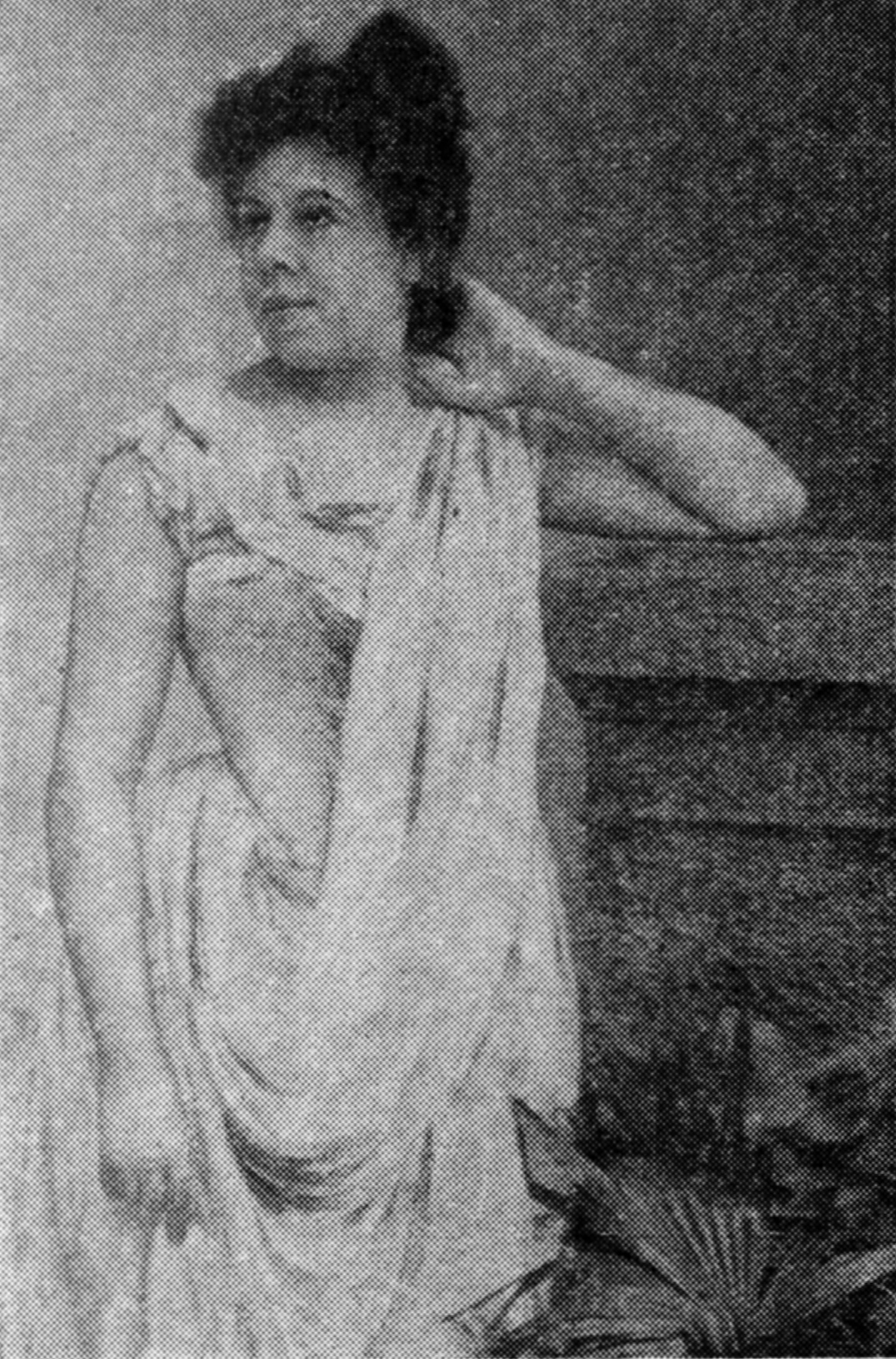

Irene Luranah Pauline Aldridge (1860 – 1932) was an English opera singer in the United States and Europe who unofficially "broke the colour barrier" for Black opera singers of Richard Wagner in 1896, well before Grace Bumbry.

Luranah went to a boarding school with her sister Amanda Aldridge at a convent in Ghent, Belgium from 1875 to 1879. This institution, named Les Dames de l’Instruction Chrétienne (The Ladies of Christian Instruction), had been created in 1807 at the request of the Bishop of Ghent, Monseigneur de Broglie, with the vocation of training young girls hitherto destined for household chores. This institution was intended for the training of young girls from the aristocracy.

Luranah Aldridge studied singing in Germany, England and France. She was said to be the "possessor of a true contralto voice" and had a wide vocal range. Charles Gounod said of her to Augustus Harris, "Do you want to hear one of the most beautiful voices that exist? Very well! Give an audition to Mademoiselle Luranah Aldridge." Harris featured Luranah in a Grand Wagner Orchestral Concert at St. James's Hall in 1893. He also cast her as one of the Valkyries in The Ring. She sang in Ring Cycles in London in 1898 and 1905. She performed in London until the First World War, after which she became bedridden with rheumatism and no longer performed.

In 1896, she was cast by Cosima Wagner to appear in the second full production of the Ring Cycle at the Bayreuth Festival. While rehearsing she fell ill, and was sent to a nearby spa to recuperate. She was unable to appear at the festival that year and despite an apparently friendly relationship with the Wagners was not invited back.

== Personal life ==
Aldridge was the daughter of actor Ira Aldridge and self-styled Swedish countess Amanda von Brandt. She was named after Ira Aldridge's mother, Luranah. Her sister was British opera singer and composer Amanda Ira Aldridge. As Luranah's rheumatism grew worse, Amanda cared for her and described Luranah in 1921 as "very helpless". Luranah died by suicide via aspirin overdose in 1932. She is buried in Gunnersbury Cemetery, in London.
