= Ida Shepley =

English actress and singer (1908–1975)

- publicity shot
- Born: Ida Mary Humphrey; 9 December 1908; Nantwich, England
- Died: 12 March 1975 (aged 66); Sydenham, England
- Occupations: singer and actor
- Employer: BBC
- Spouse: Charles Frederick Skilbeck Smith

Ida Shepley born Ida Mary Humphrey (9 December 1908 – 12 March 1975) was a British actress and singer. She began as a singer and worked with the BBC before expanding her career into acting appearing on the London stage and television.

== Life ==
Shepley was born in Nantwich in 1908. Her father was Clement Humphrey, a Caribbean-born herbalist, her mother was Gladys May born Worthington; she had a younger brother born in 1912. In 1919, her mother remarried to John Henry Elvin Shepley and the whole family took the new surname of Shepley. She kept that name in her acting work even after she married the divorcee Charles Frederick Skilbeck Smith.

In 1937, her singing abilities were recommended to the BBC and following year she worked on Mississippi Nights. She sang live with Elisabeth Welch on BBC Radio's Brief Interlude and the following year on the BBC's Band Waggon. She sang regularly for the BBC. Her friendship with Amanda Aldridge led to her career broadening. Aldridge had coached actors like Paul Robeson and with her help she was able to offer to act. Shepley advertised herself as "The bronze girl with the golden voice", but now she offered acting.

In 1944, she was in Colchester appearing in Eugene O'Neill's play All God's Chillun Got Wings with an "all coloured cast" including Earl Cameron, Robert Adams and Elizabeth Jeppe at the Repertory Theatre. The play was held over for a second week. In 1946, she was in another production of All God's Chillun Got Wings for the Unity Theatre. In that year, the BBC revived its television service and Shepley appeared in Black, Brown or Beige. When the Rodgers and Hammerstein musical Flower Drum Song came to the West End, Sheply was cast in the role of the Chinese character, Madame Liang.

Shepley played many small parts on television including three times in ITV Play of the Week and twice in BBC's Sunday Night Theatre. Her television work included a 1959 version of All God's Chillun Got Wings directed by Joan Kemp-Welch and featuring Lloyd Reckord, Connie Smith and Shepley.

Shepley died in Bromley Kent in 1975.
