= John Barbour-James =

British Guyanese activist (1867–1954)

- Born: John Alexander Barbour James; June 1867; British Guiana
- Died: 1954 (aged 86–87); Georgetown, British Guiana
- Occupations: Activist, postmaster
- Children: Amy Barbour-James

John Barbour-James (June 1867 – 1954) was a Black British activist who worked to improve the understanding and recognition of the achievements of Black people in Britain.

Barbour James was born in British Guiana, where he became the postmaster in Belfield in the 1890s. While living in British Guiana he established the self-help Victoria Belfield Agricultural Society, which promoted the value of improving the diet and farming among the Afro-Guianese People.

In 1902, he was transferred to the Gold Coast. His wife was not allowed to move to the Gold Cast. Barbour-James moved his family to London where he could more easily visit them. Later, he moved to London, where he founded the African Patriotic Intelligence Bureau in 1918. Barbour-James moved to the Caribbean in 1938, and died in Georgetown in 1954.

His daughter, Amy Barbour-James, was also a civil rights activist. She became secretary of the League of Coloured Peoples in 1942.
