= Amy Barbour-James =

British-born Guyanese civil rights activist

- Barbour-James in the mid-1930s
- Born: Caroline Amy Aileen Barbour-James; 25 January 1906; Acton, London
- Died: 4 May 1988 (aged 82); Harrow, London
- Known for: Civil rights activist

Amy Barbour-James (25 January 1906 – 4 May 1988) was a British-born Guyanese Black civil rights activist and civil servant.

== Early life and family ==
Caroline Amy Aileen Barbour-James was born in Acton, London, on 25 January 1906 to Guyanese parents, John and Caroline Barbour-James, one of their eight children. The Barbour-James family were a middle-class family who lived in west London in the early 20th century. Her father, John Barbour-James, worked as administrator in West Africa and had access to a large network of contacts throughout the continent. In 1918, he founded the African Patriotic Intelligence Bureau.

== Activism ==
Inspired by her father, Barbour-James became active in the civil rights movements and was involved in the African Progress Union and the League of Coloured Peoples, becoming secretary of the latter organisation in 1942.

In 2011, a short drama based on Barbour-James's life was broadcast by BBC Radio 4.

== Death ==
Barbour-James died in Harrow on 4 May 1988, aged 82.
