= Martin Postle =

British art historian

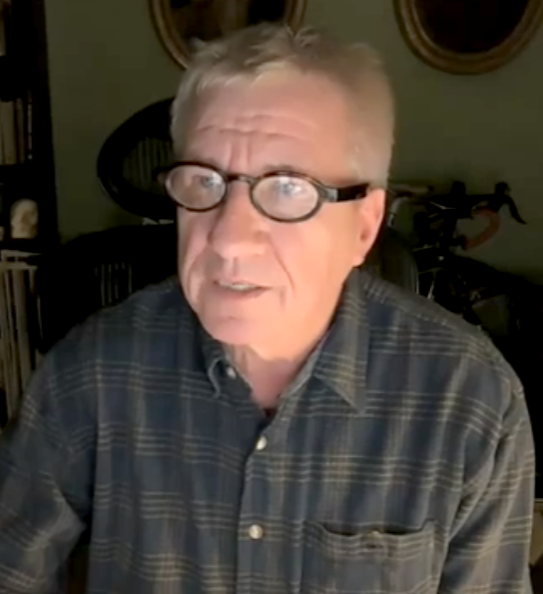
- In a Paul Mellon Centre video in 2024
- Education: University of Nottingham, Courtauld Institute of Art, Birkbeck College
- Occupation: Art historian
- Known for: Expert on Sir Joshua Reynolds

Martin Postle is a British art historian who is deputy director for collections and publications at the Paul Mellon Centre for Studies in British Art, London, and a leading expert on the art of Sir Joshua Reynolds. He is a former curator at the Tate Gallery.

== Early life and education ==
Martin Postle received his BA in art history with history from the University of Nottingham. He received his MA from the Courtauld Institute of Art in 1981 and his PhD from Birkbeck College, University of London.

== Career ==
From 1992 to 1998, Postle was associate professor of art history at the University of Delaware and director of the University of Delaware's London centre. In 1998 he joined the Tate Gallery where he was senior curator, British art 1500–1780, and subsequently head of British art to 1900.

Postle joined the Paul Mellon Centre for Studies in British Art in London in 2007 as assistant director for academic activities. He is currently deputy director for grants and publications there.

In 2008, Postle was elected a fellow of the Society of Antiquaries of London.

== Exhibitions curated ==
- The Artist's Model. Its role in British Art from Lely to Etty (Kenwood and Nottingham 1991, with Ilaria Bignamini)
- Angels and Urchins. The Fancy Picture in 18th-Century British Art (Kenwood and Nottingham 1998)
- The Artist's Model: From Etty to Spencer (Kenwood, Nottingham and York 1999, with William Vaughan)
- Art of the Garden. The Garden in British Art, 1800 to the Present Day (Tate Britain, Belfast and Manchester 2004, with Nicholas Alfrey and Stephen Daniels)
- Joshua Reynolds. The Creation of Celebrity (Tate Britain and Palazzo dei Diamanti, Ferrara 2005)
- Stanley Spencer and the English Garden (Compton Verney 2011, with Steven Parissien)
- Johan Zoffany, RA. Society Observed (Yale Center for British Art and the Royal Academy of Arts, London 2011-2012)
- Richard Wilson and the Transformation of European Landscape Painting (Yale Center for British Art and the National Museum Wales, Cardiff, 2014).

== Selected publications ==
- Sir Joshua Reynolds: The subject pictures. Cambridge University Press, Cambridge, 1995. ISBN 978-0521420662
- The artist's model: From Etty to Spencer. Merrell, 1999. (With William Vaughan) ISBN 978-1858940847
- Sir Joshua Reynolds: A complete catalogue of his paintings. Yale University Press, 2000. (The Paul Mellon Centre for Studies in British Art) ISBN 978-0300085334
- Thomas Gainsborough. Tate Publishing, London, 2002. (British Artists Series) ISBN 978-1854374158
- Joshua Reynolds: The creation of celebrity. Tate Publishing, London, 2005. ISBN 1-85437-564-4
- Pictures of innocence: Portraits of children from Hogarth to Lawrence. Holburne Museum of Art, Bath, 2005. ISBN 978-0903679091
- Model and supermodel: The artist's model in British art and culture. Manchester University Press, Manchester, 2007. ISBN 978-0719066627
