= Culture of Belize =

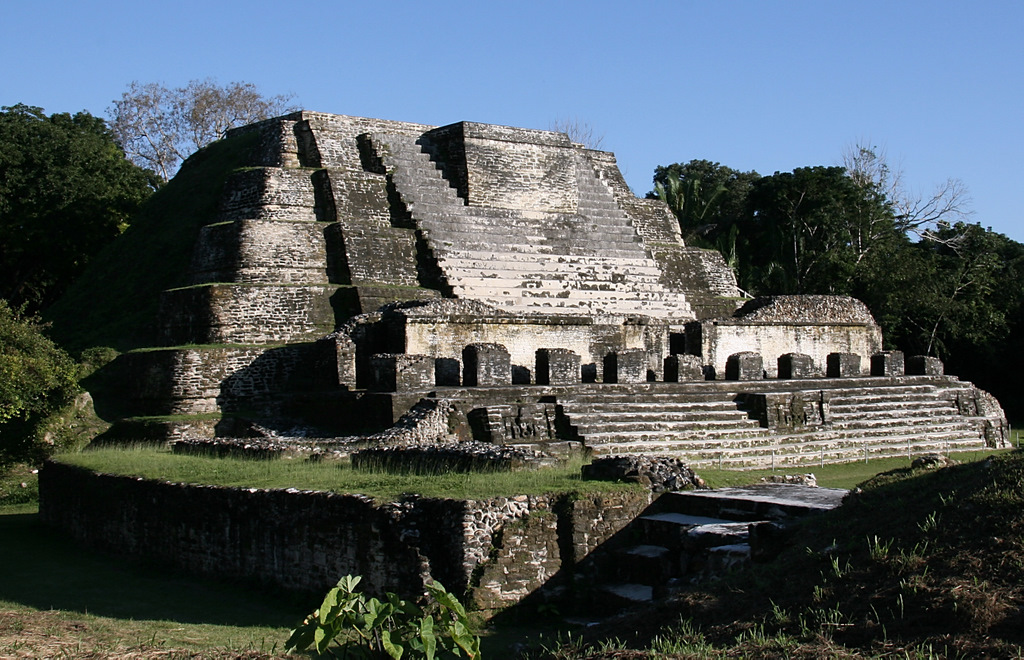
The Altun Ha archaeological site in Belize, a remnant of Mayan culture.

The culture of Belize is a mix of influences and people from Kriol, Maya, East Indian, Garinagu (also known as Garifuna), Mestizo (a mixture of Spanish and Native Americans), Mennonites who are of German descent, with many other cultures from Chinese to Lebanese. It is a unique blend that emerged through the country's long and occasionally violent history.

In Belizean folklore, we find the legends of La Llorona, Cadejo, the Tata Duende, and X'tabai. The idea of the mystical healing and Obeah is prominent in Belizean legend, and there is still talk of evil shaman practices like putting "Obeah" on certain houses. This is known to be done by burying a bottle with the 'evil' under a tree close by the house.

== Marriage and family ==
Belizean marriages are commonly celebrated with church weddings and colorful receptions featuring food, drink and dance. An increasing number of Belizean families are headed by single parents, especially mothers. Due to this trend, many of the present-day youths decline to pursue marriage and get involved in common law relationships with their partners. It is not common to encounter youths living with their parents around the age of 20 or above.

As a consequence of this trend, the most common family structure in Belize is the single-parent family. Moreover, grandparents are frequently involved in raising children, with or without the help of one of the parents. Most Belizean families either own or rent some type of house, typically wooden or concrete, and built to withstand minor fires and floods. However, when the hurricane seasons come around, most people will evacuate.

== Food and eating ==
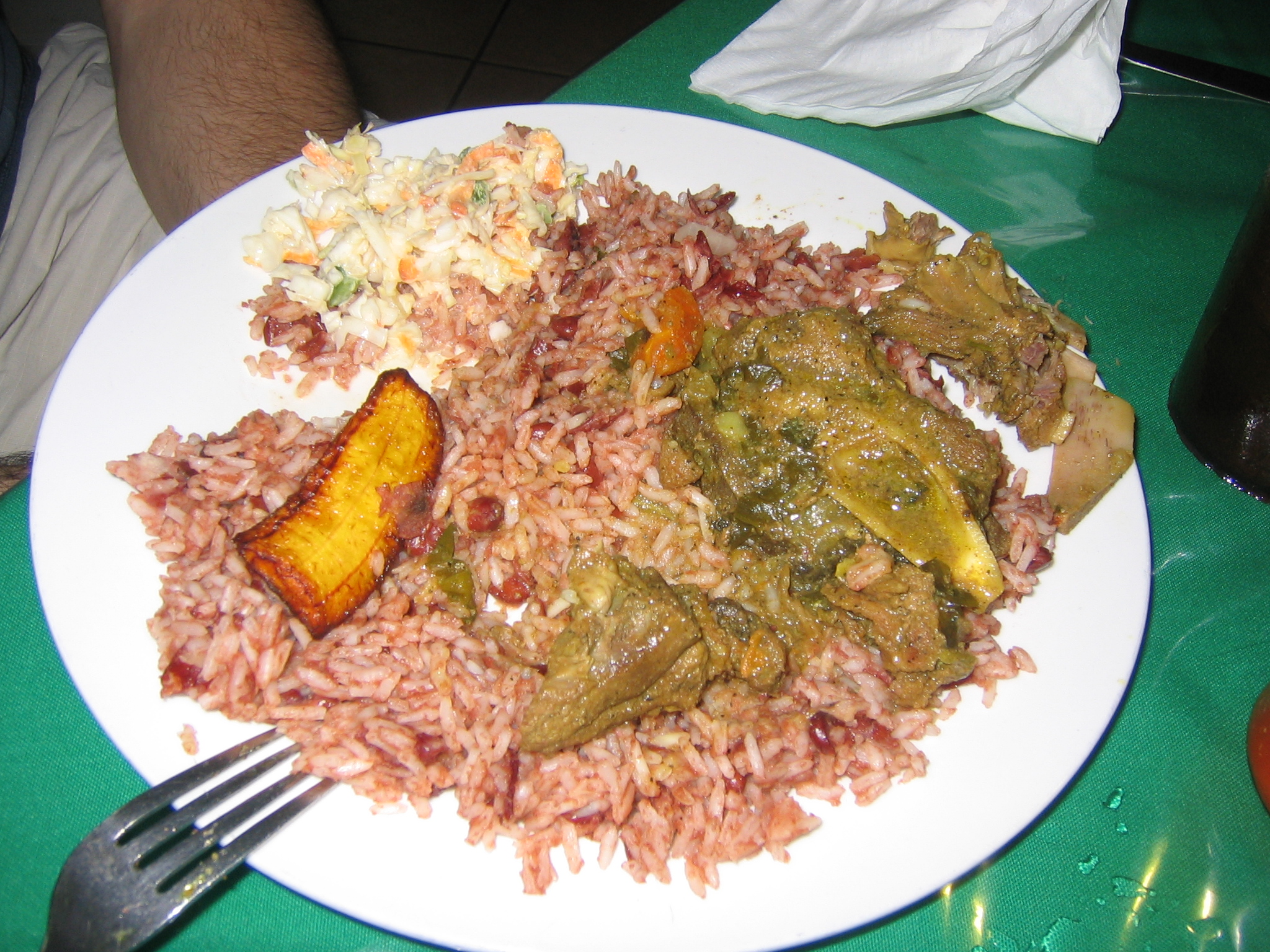
A traditional Belizean dinner.

Belizeans of all ethnicities eat a wide variety of foods. Breakfast consists of bread, flour and corn tortillas, journey (johnny in Creole) cakes, or fry jacks that are often homemade. It is eaten with various cheeses (Dutch cheese, band back cheese, craft cheese, etc.) refried beans, various forms of eggs or cereal (corn flakes, oatmeal) sweetened with condensed milk. Morning beverages include milk, coffee, tea, Milo, Ovaltine, Cocoa, orange juice (fresh or concentrated). Eating breakfast is called "drinking tea."

Midday meals vary, from lighter foods like beans and rice with or without coconut milk, tamales, panades, (fried maize (corn) shells with beans or fish) and meat pies, escabeche (onion soup), chilmole (black soup made with black recardo), stew chicken and garnaches (fried tortillas with beans, cheese, and cabbage sauce) to various constituted dinners featuring some type of rice and beans, meat and salad or coleslaw.

In the rural areas meals may be more simplified than in the cities. The Maya use recardo, corn or maize for most of their meals, and the Garifuna are fond of fish and other seafood, cassava (particularly made into hudut) and vegetables. Local fruits and certain vegetables are quite common. Mealtime is a communion for families and schools and some businesses close at midday for lunch, reopening later in the afternoon.

== Socializing ==
With a population of nearly 400,000 people, Belize has more than 10 distinct languages that each hold their own cultural implications. All of these languages create a hierarchy with English at the top and Spanish at the bottom. Belize is the only Central American country with English as its national language, and this is because of the country's rich history of British imperialism. As a result, the English language along with Western culture has left a lasting imprint on Belize's culture.

Nationwide, Belizeans regard American and British English as the highest form of communication. British and American visitors, especially higher ranking officials, are celebrated and treated with honors. In some cases, being able to speak "proper" English as well as being informed on European and American high culture allows for individuals in Belizean society to progress their careers and gain an elevated social status.

Although English is regarded as the preferred form of political and social interaction, a more common vernacular called English Creole is spoken throughout Belize. To speak English Creole means, to those living in Belize, that you are a "born-Belizean." This automatically places you above "outsiders" particularly those of Spanish speaking descent. Though Spanish speakers make up a majority of rural Belizeans, English Creole speakers typically regard the Spanish as having the same form of culture as Guatemalans and Mexicans. The tension between English Creole speakers and Spanish speakers derives from immigrants from other Central American countries as well as the nation's history of Spanish-British conflicts.

Courtesy is important to most Belizeans. It is not uncommon for Belizeans to greet each other on the street even if they have never seen each other before, or for acquaintances to spend minutes at a time chatting. It is, however, considered impolite to greet by first names, (gial, and bwai are common and acceptable) unless one has already established a relationship of some depth (you have had one or more conversations together). A simple nod of the head or shouting is acceptable when passing someone on the street, and acquaintances might also be greeted with any number of introductory phrases as covered here:

- Maanin! ("Good morning!")
- Weh di gowan? ("What is going on?")
- Aee Bwai! ("Hi Buddy!")

Other acceptable greetings are handshakes, combinations of palms and fingers touching, thumbs locking and slaps on the back, or even a kiss on the cheek for someone to show great appreciation and trust. Formal situations call for use of titles and surnames, and children are expected to address their elders with Miss/Mister and answer “Yes, ma’am” or “No, sir” when asked questions but often do not.

Since the late introduction of television in 1980, visiting with friends is not as common as it used to be. When such a visit does occur Belizeans generally take care to make even unexpected guests feel at home. However, arranged visits are more commonly practiced, arriving without previous notice to a friend’s home may be seen as impolite or dangerous.

== Recreation and sports ==
The most popular sports are football and basketball, and there is enthusiastic support for league teams formed since the early 1990s. Other sports enjoyed in Belize include volleyball, track and field, cricket, jai-alai, boxing, cycling, and softball, which all have established associations. Catching on in recent years are triathlon, canoeing, chess, darts, billiards, martial arts, and even ice hockey (in the Western Cayo District among the Mennonite population). An international cross-country cycling race is held every Easter weekend. Belize has the world's second largest barrier reef and hundreds of small islands, called cayes, that are popular recreation areas for urban people, particularly during school vacations and Easter.

== Music and art ==
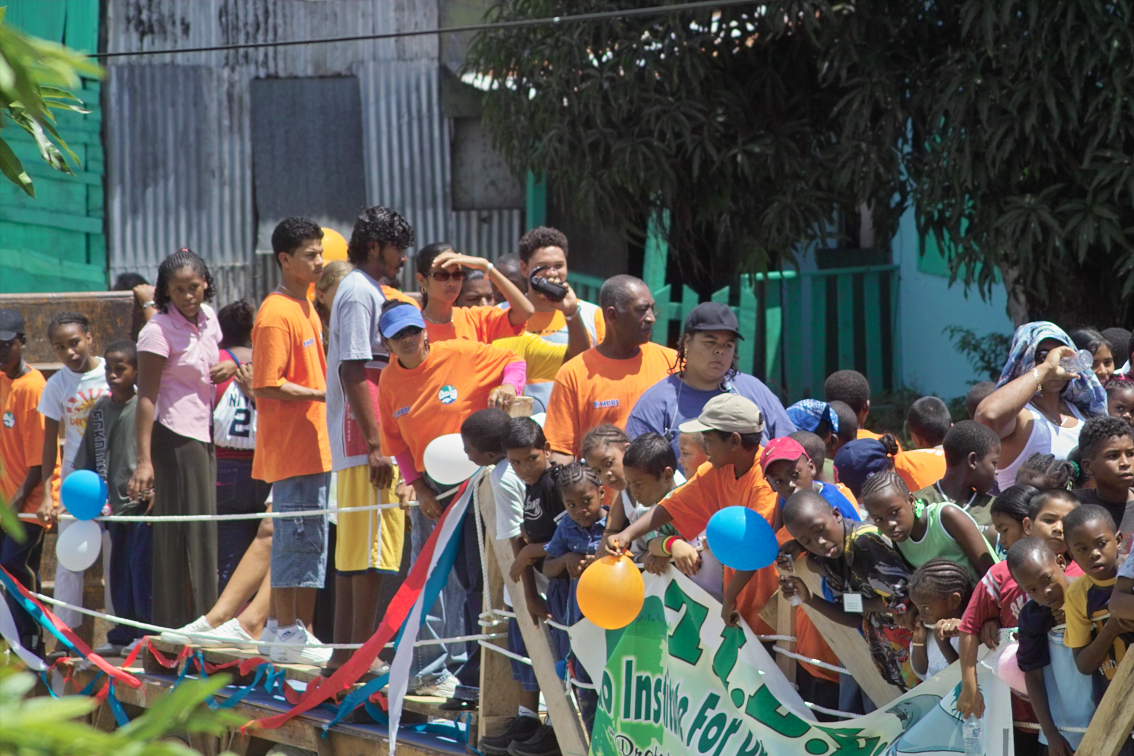
People watch a parade in Punta Gorda.

Punta is by the far most popular genre of Garifuna music and has become the most popular genre in all of Belize. It is distinctly Afro-Caribbean, and is sometimes said to be ready for international popularization like similarly-descended styles (reggae, calypso, merengue, etc.). Established stars include Andy Palacio, Herman "Chico" Ramos, "Mohobub" Flores, Adrian "The Doc" Martinez, and Lindsford "Supa G" Martinez. A slower, more melodic variant, known as Paranda, has been catching on recently behind the talents of Honduras' Aurelio Martinez and Paul Nabor of Punta Gorda; Nabor's signature track "Naguya Nei" is considered the informal popular anthem of the Garifuna nation.

Brukdown is a very popular modern style of Belizean music related to Calypso. It evolved out of the music and dance of loggers, especially a form called buru. Its greatest proponents include Wilfred Peters and Gerald "Lord" Rhaburn of Belize City and Leela Vernon of Punta Gorda.

Reggae, Dancehall, and Soca imported from Jamaica and the rest of the West Indies, and Rap, Hip-Hop, heavy metal and rock music from the United States, are also popular among the youth of Belize. Belize's recording industry turns out a few CDs each year; the majority of musical exposure occurs at monthly concerts featuring Belizean and international artists sharing the same card, or else DJ's mixing music at local nightclubs.

Drama and Acting have also become a part of the Belizean culture. Many plays have taken place at the Bliss Center for the Performing Arts and the George Price Center for Peace and development. Several plays that have had a dramatic impact are "Tigga Dead" written by the Governor General. Also "Stop! Stop the Bus", directed by Beverly Swasey.

== Media ==
- List of newspapers in Belize
- List of television stations in Belize

== See also ==
- Disability in Belize
- Public holidays in Belize
- Religion in Belize
