= Rosita Baltazar =

- Born: Rosa Rosita Baltazar; 16 August 1960; Livingston, Guatemala
- Died: 6 July 2015 (aged 54); Ladyville, Belize
- Occupations: dancer, choreographer and dance instructor
- Years active: 1980–2015
- Known for: co-founder of the Belize National Dance Company

Rosita Baltazar (16 August 1960 – 6 July 2015) was a Belizean choreographer, dancer, dance instructor and founding assistant director of the Belize National Dance Company. In 2004, she was awarded the Lord Rhaburn Music Award as a dance ambassador and in 2009 she received the Chatoyer Recognition Award from the National Garifuna Council of Belize for her efforts at preserving Garifuna culture.

== Biography ==
Baltazar was born on 16 August 1960 in Livingston, Guatemala to Enes and Merejilda Baltazar and was raised in Punta Gorda, Belize, attending St. Peter Claver Primary School. She continued her education at St. Peter Claver College, which is now the Toledo Community College. As a teenager, she moved to Belize City, Belize. From an early age she determined to become a dancer and at the beginning of the 1980s she started her professional career with the Leo Mar Dance Group. She was discovered by an American dance instructor and offered a scholarship to train at the Sarasota Ballet Arts School in Sarasota, Florida. The 6-month seminar was attended by four Belizean dancers and when they returned to Belize, they continued to practice together. This group would be the core of dancers who in 1990 co-founded the Belize National Dance Company, for which Baltazar served as assistant artistic director. In her various capacities with the National Dance Company, Baltazar not only appeared in hundreds of shows, but also choreographed routines, created concepts, and planned and organized performances.

Baltazar later studied at the National Dance Theatre Company of Jamaica. Continuing her education, she trained at the Ballet Folklórico de México. Initially, her style focused on the Afro-Caribbean dances, such as hungu hungu, gunjei, paranda, and punta, but her training gave her a basis in classical, folk and modern dance styles, which she was later able to incorporate into both her choreography and teaching.

Baltazar served as the director and developer of the junior dance companies which operate as branches of the National Dance Company. In 1998, she established the San Pedro Dance Company followed two years later by The Caye Caulker Dance Company. The Caye Caulker school was founded by Baltazar and Cuban dancer Mariela Rodriguez to teach dance to island children. In addition to her work with the National Dance Company, Baltazar was a traveling teacher, providing dance instruction both privately and at public schools such as Grace Primary School, Holy Redeemer Primary School, St. Ignatius School, St. Joseph's School in Belize City and Pan Cotto School in Sandhill. In 2004, Baltazar, along with fellow founder of the National Dance Company, Althea Sealy, was awarded the Lord Rhaburn Music Award as dance ambassadors.

In 1997, Baltazar choreographed the dance for Costa Maya Festival contestants of the Reina de la Costa Maya Pageant, which led to her continued involvement in choreographing the event. Baltazar was invited in 2001 to serve as a facilitator for a Garifuna Heritage Summer Camp held on St. Vincent as part of a heritage reclamation project. Becoming one of the founders of the Garifuna Heritage Foundation in St. Vincent, she taught both language and dance to Garinagu descendants on the island. She taught both modern and Garifuna folk dancing on St. Vincent for many years and in 2009 was awarded the Chatoyer Recognition Award by the National Garifuna Council of Belize for her endeavors to preserve and protect Garifuna culture.

Throughout her career, Baltazar traveled abroad widely, including a trip with Andy Palacio to Malaysia in 2002; and performances throughout the Caribbean, in Costa Rica, Cuba, France, Mexico, Spain and the United States. While touring in Spain in September 2012, Baltazar was diagnosed with breast cancer and sought treatment in England. Members of the Company performed in benefits to assist in raising funds for Baltazar's treatment and her cancer went into remission. Refusing to stop working, Baltazar continued to perform and teach. Her last solo performance occurred on 6 April 2015 in a dance entitled “Our Father” and a few months prior to her death, she had opened a dance studio in Ladyville.

Baltazar died on 6 July 2015 at her home in the Los Lagos neighborhood of Ladyville. Posthumously, she was honored with the Belizean Meritorious Service Award during the September Celebrations in 2015.

== Sources ==
- Ali, Marion (10 July 2015). "Dance legend, Rosita Baltazar dies of cancer". The Reporter. Belize City, Belize. Archived from the original on July 17, 2015.
- Bain, Delahnie (18 September 2012). "Belize National dance Company star has cancer". Belize City, Belize: News Channel 5.
- Balderamos Garcia, Dolores (17 January 2015). "Kudos, Rosita Baltazar!!". The Belize Times. Belize City, Belize.
- Heusner, Karla (14 October 2005). "Belize Dance Company celebrates 15th anniversary". Belize City, Belize: News Channel 5.
- Ramos, Adele (12 December 2004). "Rhaburn's Awards Show—a smashing success!!". Amandala. Belize City, Belize.
- Ramos, Adele (17 October 2005). "Personality of the Week: Rosita Baltazar". Amandala. Belize City, Belize.
- Ramos, Adele (10 July 2015). "Iconic Belizean dancer, Rosita Baltazar, 55, to be laid to rest Friday". Amandala. Belize City, Belize.
- Woods, Jacqueline (16 August 2000). "Salvadoran wins Costa Maya crown". Belize City, Belize: News Channel 5.
- "Belize Dance Company: 15 Years of Dance". Belize City, Belize: 7 News Belize. October 21, 2005.
- "Rosita Baltazar Awarded". Ambergris Today. Vol. 11, no. 10. San Pedro, Belize. 6 March 2009. Archived from the original on 14 December 2010.
- "Caye Caulker Dance Company???". Conch Telegraph. Vol. 1, no. 3. Caye Caulker, Belize. 30 June 2000.
- "Summarised Annual Reports 2001–2010" (PDF). Kingstown, St. Vincent and the Grenadines: The Garifuna Heritage Foundation. 31 December 2011.
- "Andy P. and Garifuna all-stars go east". Belize City, Belize: News Channel 5. 5 July 2002.
- "The Mayan Rain God blesses Costa Maya Festival – Miss Astrid Ramirez "reigns" as Queen of the Mayan coast". The San Pedro Sun. San Pedro, Belize. 24 July 1998.
- "San Pedro Dance Company debuts". The San Pedro Sun. San Pedro, Belize. 4 December 1998.
- "Our Community – Rosita Baltazar – "Sharing the gift of dance with San Pedro"". The San Pedro Sun. San Pedro, Belize. 28 December 2000.
- "Belize mourns the loss of dance pioneer Rosita Baltazar". The San Pedro Sun. San Pedro, Belize. 10 July 2015.
- "Rosita Baltazar honored at Tribute to the Belizean Patriots Award Ceremony". The San Pedro Sun. San Pedro, Belize. 30 September 2015.
