= Music of Belize =

The music of Belize has a mix of Creole, Mestizo, Garìfuna, Mayan and European influences.

== European and African influences ==
After many centuries of Maya habitation, British colonizers arrived in the area in the 17th century. Belize was Britain's only colony in Spanish-dominated Central America until self-government in 1964 and gaining full Independence in 1981. Belize is still part of the Commonwealth of Nations. Far more influential than this presence, however, was the importation of African slaves.

Europeans brought polkas, waltzes, schottisches and quadrilles, while Africans brought numerous instruments and percussion-based musics, including marimba. African culture resulted in the creation of brukdown music in interior logging camps, played using banjo, guitar, drums, dingaling bell, accordion and an ass' jaw bone played by running a stick up and down the teeth.

== Mestizo and Maya music ==
The Maya presence in Belize traces back to 2600 B.C. Almost forty sites of ancient Mayan ruins have been discovered in the Belizean area of the Yucatán Peninsula. Most of what is known about the music of ancient Maya in Belize has been discovered in the iconographies and artifacts discovered in these sites. In 1986, the excavation of the tombs of two elite Maya women in Pacbitun revealed a myriad assortment of ancient flutes, rattles, and ceramic drums. The shapes and styles of the flutes found in the tombs suggest that instruments served an important role in Mayan burial. One globular flute, for example, represents a god/religious figure of death. These flutes were also capable of playing several octaves, which suggests melody and tone as a key musical aspect in ancient Maya.

Much of Mayan culture is sustained through the Maya-Mestizo population. Of the 60% of the Belize's population with Mayan ancestry, 83% are also of Mestizo/Spanish origins. While little research has been done on the musics of Belize's largest demographic, what is known about contemporary Maya music can be derived from neighboring Guatemalan and Mexican traditions. One possible reason for a lack of knowledge surrounding Mestizo musical history is the lack of potential fieldwork due to the complex demographic populations. Contemporary Maya-Metstizo music exists in a hybrid form. An example of contemporary Maya music is the traditional flute and drum alongside traditional Spanish instruments like the marimba, violin, and guitar. The K’ekchi harp ensemble is one example of such cultural blending. The origin of the K’ekchi varies depending on the source: Maya communities believe that the K’ekchi harp music was created by the Maya Gods, while others attest that the ensemble is a hybrid creation brought on by the Spaniards as they converted the Maya to Christianity. The K’ekchi primarily plays during Easter and Christmas, which is evidence of Christian influence.

Maya Mestizo culture in north and west Belize, and also Guatemala, is characterised by marimba, a xylophone-like instrument descended from an African instrument. Marimba bands use drum sets, double bass and sometimes other instruments. Famous performers included Alma Belicena and the Los Angeles Marimba Band. Well known band of Maya Pax music was La Banda de San Jose. One of the popular contemporary marimba bands is the Benque Marimba Youth Academy. In the villages of northern Belize you will also find Maya Pax bands which mostly play for traditional Maya dances like the Hoghead dance like La banda de San Jose in Orange Walk district.

Cumbia music is mostly performed by bands in the northern region of the country where Mestizos and Maya (Yucatec Maya) are abundant.

== Creole music ==
Creole music culture is largely focused around political issues surrounding the Creole people of both Belize and the Caribbean. Stylistically, Creole music is widely known in Belize for its call-and-response structure, which requires at least two voices. The call– usually just one person– sings the first line and alternates lines with the response– who can be one or many people– in a typical ABA or three-part rondo form. The melodies, often in common time, showcase diatonic movement, arpeggios and sequential figures.

Among the most popular styles created by Kriol musicians is brukdown. Brukdown evolved out of the music and dance of loggers, especially a form called buru. Buru was often satirical in nature, and eventually grew more urban, accompanied by a donkey's jawbone, drums and a banjo. The word brukdown may come from broken down calypso, referring to the similarities between brukdown and Trinidadian calypso music; the presence of large numbers of Jamaicans in Belize also led to an influence from mento music.

In modern forms, new instruments have been added to brukdown. The "boom and chime groups" use bass guitar, electric guitar and congas, for example. Popular brukdown groups include The Tigers, The Mahogany Chips, Mimi Female Duet and Brad Pattico.

== Garifuna music ==
The Garifuna (also called Garinagu) are descended from escaped Island Caribs who were deported from St. Vincent to Central America (especially Honduras and also Belize) in 1802 by the British when they conquered St. Vincent. The Garifunas kept themselves apart from the social system then dominant, leading to a distinctive culture that developed throughout the 20th century.

Forms of Garifuna folk music and dance encompass many styles including: punta, hungu-hungu, combination, wanaragua, abaimahani, matamuerte, laremuna wadaguman, gunjai, charikanari, sambai, charikanari, eremuna egi, paranda, berusu, punta rock, teremuna ligilisi, arumahani, and Mali-amalihani. Punta and Punta rock are the most popular forms of dance music in Garifuna culture. Punta is performed around holidays and at parties, and other social events. Punta lyrics are usually composed by the women. Chumba and hunguhungu are circular dances in a three beat rhythm, which are often combined with punta. There are other songs typical to each gender, women having eremwu eu and abaimajani, rhythmic a cappella songs, and laremuna wadaguman, men's work songs.

Drums play an important role in Garifuna music. These drums are typically made of hollowed-out hardwood such as mahogany or mayflower, with the skins coming from the peccary (wild bush pig), deer, or sheep. Also used in combination with the drums are the sisera. These shakers are made from the dried fruit of the gourd tree, filled with seeds, then fitted with hardwood handles.

In contemporary Belize there has been a resurgence of Garifuna music, popularized by musicians such as Andy Palacio. These musicians have taken many aspects from traditional Garifuna music forms and fused them with more modern sounds in a style described as a mixture of punta rock and paranda. One great example is Andy Palacio's album Watina released on the Belizean record label "Stone Tree Records."

== Modern music ==
Belize's musical base has expanded considerably in recent years with the addition of local Punta rockreggae, reggaeton, punta, soca, dancehall, hip hop, rock, and metal acts. The latter genre includes musicians like Shyne, Lova Boy, Hanal Pixan and Ascenthium.

However, despite growing local scenes, modern music from other Caribbean nations (primarily Jamaican dancehall and Trinidadian soca ), as well as commercial pop music from the United States and United Kingdom still remain the most popular genres of music among young Belizeans.

== Belizean artists ==
Notable Belizean artists and performers include:

- Andy Palacio
- Lova Boy, Punta rock
- Paul Nabor, Garifna
- Pen Cayetano, Garifuna, creole
- Wilfred Peters, Creole Brukdown

== See also ==
- Punta
- Brukdown
- Reggae
