= Sofía Blanco =

Guatemalan singer

- Born: Sofía Blanco Arzú; 1953 (age 72–73); Livingston, Guatemala
- Occupation: singer

Sofía Blanco (born 1953) is a Garifuna singer from Guatemala, widely recognized for her talent and efforts to promote the cultural traditions of her people. She has been a featured singer on several albums of Garifuna music, and has toured internationally with the Belizean group Garifuna Collective and Garifuna Women's performance band Umalali, one of the groups selected for performances at the 2010 Winter Olympics in Vancouver.

== Early life ==
Sofía Blanco Arzú was born in 1953 in Livingston, Guatemala to Virginia Arzú Norales and Anastasio Blanco Vargas. Her family heritage was Garifuna and she lived in the San José barrio of Livingston, near the home of noted paranda singer Ursino "Fidu" Cayetano. Unlike other Garifuna of her generation, she attended school, but left after fourth grade. From a young age, she participated in musical performances and developed an interest in preserving the music heritage of the Garifuna people. At the age of 20, she married the composer Gregorio Baltazar Roche, with whom she raised two children, Silvia and Gregorio Baltazar Blanco.

== Career ==
Though she began singing in the paranda, by the 1980s, Blanco's voice and style were lore suited to gayusa, a call and response type of singing accompanied by a bass drum and a flourishing drum providing rhythm with maracas punctuating the beat. Traditionally used for ritual songs and dance performances during the rites, the leader performs the call and is answered by the choir. She performed with the group Despertar Garífuna Marcos Sánchez Díaz (Marcos Sánchez Díaz Garifuna Awakening), which was a group dedicated to preserving and promoting Garifuna heritage. In 1992, Blanco produced a double album with the Guatemalan Tourism Institute (Spanish: Instituto Guatemalteco de Turismo INGUAT), which contained the music performed at the Primer Encuentro de Músicos de la Tradición Popular Garífuna (First Gathering of Musicians of the Garifuna Popular Tradition). In 1997, while performing with the Afro-Guatemalan Organization (Spanish: Organización Negra Guatemalteca, ONEGUA) in Belize, she met Ivan Duran of Stonetree Records, who produced the music of Andy Palacio.

Through that meeting, Duran was inspired to launch the Garifuna Women's Project, seeking out female performers and recording them. Because the women had not performed professionally before, Duran worked with Blanco and the others recording in venues where they were more comfortable than they were in a recording studio. For ten years, Blanco worked with Duran and Palacio to gather the traditions of Garifuna women in music, while continuing her international performance career. In 2006, she participated in the anniversary CD Ten Years of Stonetree and the following year, performed in the chorus for Wátina, Palacio's last album. In 2008, Umalali: The Garifuna Women's Project was released by Stonetree and in the United States by the Cumbancha label. Among the songs Blanco performed on the album were "Nibari" (My Grandchild), with lyrics composed by her husband and her own lyrics written for "Yunduya Weyu" (The Sun Has Set). "Nibari" was the opening track of the album and earned Blanco praise as one of the "Garifuna's most accomplished voice(s)" and a comparison by Sarah Weeden of National Public Radio to the emotional performances of Edith Piaf. To promote the album and pay homage to Palacio, who died unexpectedly that same year, she toured with the Garifuna Collective giving performances in Los Angeles, Belize, and then across Europe for two months.

The reception of the album, sparked the creation of a band of the same name, Umalali, which was composed of members from Palacio's Garifuna Collective, featuring Blanco, Desere Diego, and Chella Torres, as singers. In 2009, they toured in Canada. That same year, Blanco founded in Livingston, Iseri Laruga (New Dawn), a Garifuna youth music and dance troupe, which performs along the Caribbean coast and in central Guatemala. In 2010, the group was invited to Walt Disney World near Miami, Florida, to perform and she conducted a workshop on Garifuna music traditions in Guatemala City for artists from the Dominican Republic, Haiti, Guatemala, and Panama. That same year, she toured with Umalali on a tour that began in Seattle, and held performances in San Diego and Chico, California, before appearing in New Hampshire and culminating in a performance at the Cultural Olympiad for the 2010 Winter Olympic Games in Vancouver. In 2011, Blanco collaborated with Aurelio Martínez on Laru Beya and was recognized by UNESCO as "cultural ambassador and spokesperson for the Garifuna's musical heritage". When she is not touring, she works in the family convenience store in Livingston and though she has considered stopping touring, she performed in Miami in 2018.
