= Music of Honduras =

Music of Honduras Topics
Reggaeton	Folklore
Paranda	Marimba
Bachata	Raspe
Classical music	Punta
Merengue	Hip Hop
Latin pop	Cumbia
Salsa	Reggae
Techno	Electronic Music
Timeline and Samples
Central American music
Belize - Costa Rica - El Salvador - Guatemala - Honduras - Nicaragua - Panama

Music of Honduras is a complex mix of musical traditions from West Africa, Central Africa, the Iberian Peninsula, and the Indigenous peoples of the Americas. Punta is the main rhythm of Honduras with other music such as Paranda, Bachata, Raspe, salsa, cumbia, reggae, merengue, soca, calypso, dancehall, Reggaeton, Afro beats, Narcocorrido.

Punta, the main music genre in Honduras, is traditionally played with Afro-Honduran drums, Maracas and/or Shekere, Conch shell, Congas, and other additional instruments.

== Overview ==
Honduras' capital Tegucigalpa is an important center for modern Honduran music, and is home to the College for Fine Arts.

Folk music is played with guitar, marimba, Congas and other instruments. Punta is popular in Honduras. Popular folk songs include La ceiba and Candú.

There is an Orquesta Sinfónica Nacional de Honduras (a national orchestra) in Comayagua.

== Punta ==
Punta is the main genre heard around Honduras. Punta originated through the Garifuna tribe. The Garifuna peoples origins trace back to the enslaved West Africans blending with the Indigenous populations of the Caribbeans. This blend of cultures can be demonstrated through their music. Punta is not only a genre of music but also a lively form of dance as well. Like many Latin genres, Punta form through slave trades and this tribe creating this music as a way to dance and celebrate. Today Punta has evolved into various different styles with the most popular being Punta Rock which came in around the late 1980s-1990's.

Early Punta started as a ritual or used in celebrations and moved towards folk and poetic music to the Garifuna tribes.Punta was often performed by females which equates to the movement of the dance. Punta dance is described as a sensual dance, moving the hips and shaking their bottoms. This dance moves the lower half while keeping their upper half almost stagnant. Though men can also dance Punta, oftentimes it is women who are dancing together in a circle while the men watch. This dance is also competitive and it may be seen that the dancers will try to outdo each other.

Punta is typically done in a 2/4 time signature, starting with two eighth-note and the following beat being a quarter note. This beat is kept by the drums and allows for different variations of beats in order to change the pace of dancing. When it comes to dancing, it is fast pace movements with every eighth-note being a step in the beat, in order to take a break or rest during dancing they will transition to having every beat being a step. Since this is a fast pace movement this allows dancers to take a break without stopping the rhythm of the music.

Punta has been seen in various different types of context. Punta can be danced at festivals, celebrations and even funerals. Punta uses traditional musical instruments deriving from the roots of Garifuna tribes. The drums are one of the most prevalent instruments that can be heard in any Punta song followed by strings and wind instruments. As time moves on more modern instruments have been added to add more depth to the music and fit modern taste however the standard instruments have stayed through all the musical trends.

Punta and has developed different subcategories of Punta. These subcategories include: Punta rock, Traditional Punta, Folkloric Punta, and Urban Punta. Punta rock added a modern twist becoming popular in 1990's with one of the most known artist being Andy Palacios. Traditional Punta emphasizes the drums and its call and response element to lyrics used. Folkloric Punta focuses more on the tradition instruments used by the Garifuna people and has a story-telling element to its lyrics and dance. Lastly Urban Punta mixes hip-hop elements and digital elements while maintaining traditional beats to modernize the style.

== Notable musicians ==
- Banda Blanca
- Aurelio Martinez
- Javier Monthiel
- Polache
- Guillermo Anderson

== See also ==
- Music of Costa Rica
- Music of Peru
- Music of Guatemala
- Music of Panama
- Music of Puerto Rico
- Music of Mexico
- Music of Brazil
