= Punta rock =

Form of Garifuna music

- Stylistic origins: Punta; calypso; soca
- Typical instruments: Garifuna drums; shekere; turtle shell; electric guitar; bass guitar; keyboard; drums

Regional scenes
- Belize; Guatemala; Honduras; Nicaragua; United States

Other topics
- Garifuna music

Punta rock or Belizean punta, is a form of Garifuna music originating in Belize and created by Pen Cayetano. Songs are sung in Belizean Kriol, Garifuna and Spanish. Many Garifuna American artists and bands perform the genre as well.

== Origins ==
Punta rock is a subgenre of punta largely credited to Pen Cayetano, Andy Palacio, and Fuerza Garifuna. Beginning in the 1970s, these artists sought to create a modernized version of the traditional punta to appeal to younger audiences.

Punta is a style of traditional music and dance that developed among the Garifuna people of Saint Vincent, Honduras, Belize, Guatemala, and Nicaragua. Punta rock thus filled the gap and revitalized a waning musical style, becoming popular in several Central American countries.

The two countries where punta rock is most prevalent are Belize and Honduras. Dangriga, the Belizean birthplace of the music genre, is the first Garifuna settlement in the nation. Its position as a town that sits between a traditional village life and an urban setting is reflective of the amalgamation of traditional and popular music styles in punta rock.

== Characteristics ==
Punta rock is described as an electrified commercial dance music based on the traditional punta genre. It is sung primarily in Garifuna, as much of its repertoire consists of contemporary adaptations of traditional Garifuna songs. It blends guitars and electronic instruments with traditional rhythmic drumming and singing patterns played to a higher tempo, adding vocal harmonies and lyrical themes of cultural and regional pride.

=== Belize ===
Belizean punta rock is significantly shaped by popular music from Anglophone Caribbean countries, such as Trinidadian calypso and soca and Jamaican reggae. Unlike in Honduras, the genre has largely stayed tied to its indigenous roots.

=== Honduras ===
Punta rock gained popularity in Honduras by the 1990s, particularly with the release of the 1991 international hit "Sopa de Caracol", by Banda Blanca. In contrast to Belizean punta rock, Latin American popular styles like salsa and cumbia shaped the local version of the genre, which also differed in that it was mostly sung in Spanish.

== Notable artists ==
Belizean

- Pen Cayetano
- Andy Palacio
- Paul Nabor

Honduran

- Aurelio Martínez
- Banda Blanca
