= Umalali =

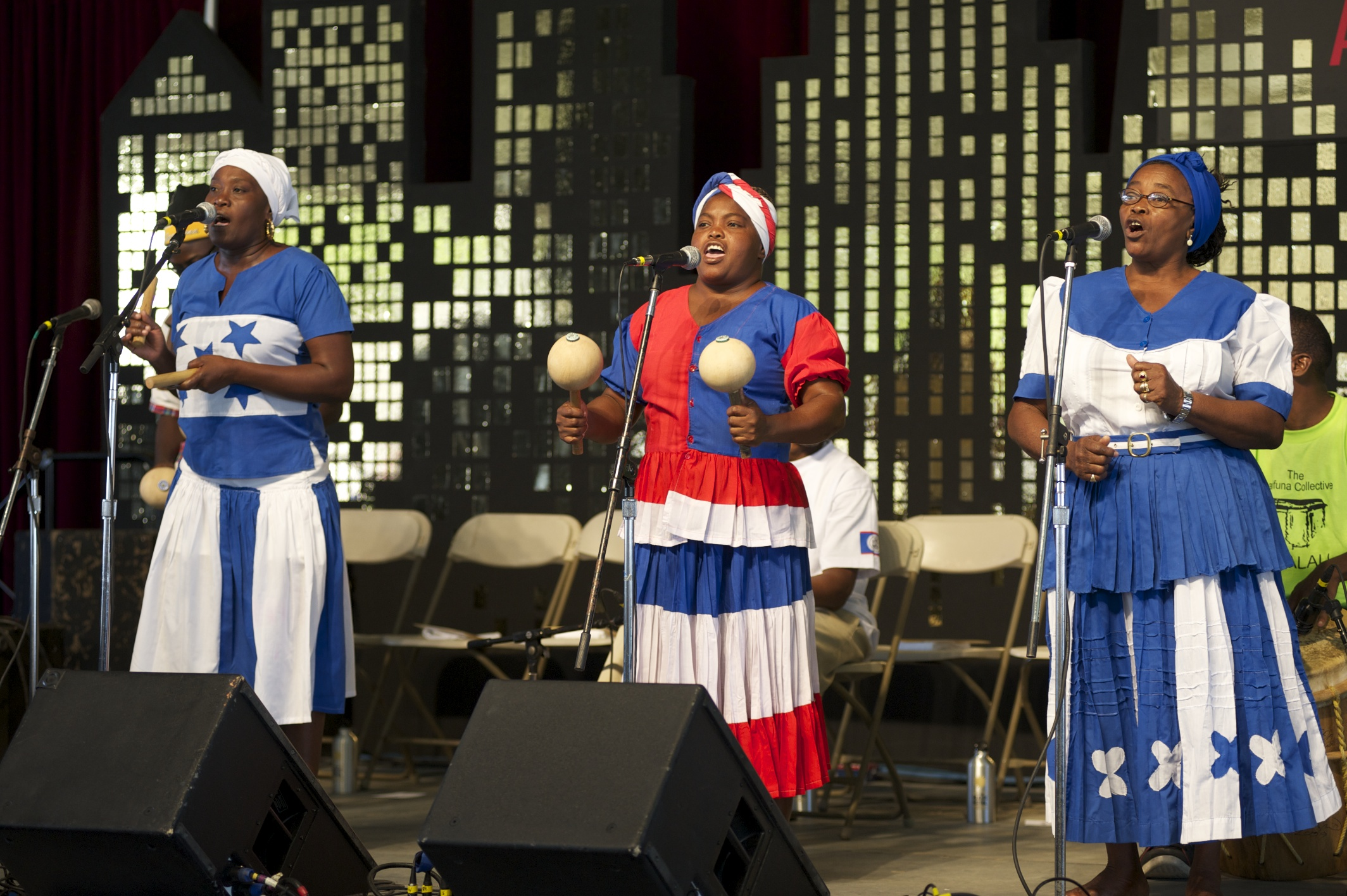
- Umalali featuring the Garifuna Collective on the Peace Corps World Stage at Smithsonian Folklife Festival 2011

Background information
- Origin: Belize, Honduras and Guatemala
- Genres: Garifuna music, World music
- Instruments: Garifuna drums, sisera, conch shell, turtleshell snare, saxophone, acoustic guitar, electric guitar and bass guitar
- Years active: 2008 – present
- Labels: Cumbancha, Stonetree Records; producer: Ivan Duran
- Website: Cumbancha, Stonetree Records

Umalali is a collaborative project put together by Belizean musician and producer, Ivan Duran. Umalali is defined by the stories that comprise The Garifuna Women's Project.

== Background ==
For Ivan, in part, Umalali is his own story, built on 10 years of recording various female vocalists and collecting songs that told the stories of the women of Garifuna. The Garifuna people are the descendants of shipwrecked African slaves who intermarried with indigenous people and lived on the Caribbean island of St. Vincent in the 17th century. In the 1790s, they were shipped by British authorities to Roatán Island off the Central American coast, and had soon created settlements in Honduras, Belize, Guatemala and Nicaragua. Duran recorded women and the traditional songs in everyday settings: kitchens, in the streets etc... "The project was always about the stories, about the lives of these women, about capturing the essence of their voices and putting them in a modern context. I was looking for songs that people everywhere could enjoy for their musicality and melodies, not just on a purely intellectual level."

== Production ==
In 2002, five years into the project, Duran constructed a small, thatched roof, studio on the shore of the Caribbean Sea in Belize. From there, Duran tried to get the women he wanted on the album to take a break from their daily chores and come record. After getting all of the vocal tracks he wanted, Duran returned to his Stonetree Studio in western Belize and began another five-year process of layering instruments and adding effects to make the local music he had captured, speak to a global audience. In 2007, the final touches were put on the album and the project was complete. In 2008, The Garifuna Women's Project was released on independent label, Cumbancha.

== Discography ==
- The Garifuna Women's Project (2008)
