= Sopa de Caracol =

1991 single by Banda Blanca

Single by Banda Blanca

from the album Sopa de Caracol
- Language: Garifuna and Spanish
- Released: 1991
- Recorded: 1990
- Genre: Punta rock
- Length: 4:48
- Label: Sonotone Music
- Songwriters: Hernán "Chico" Rámos; Juan Pompilio Tejeda

Banda Blanca singles chronology
"Sopa de Caracol" (1991)	"Fiesta" (1991)

"Sopa de Caracol" ("Snail Soup") is a song performed by the Honduran punta rock band Banda Blanca. It was originally written by Belizean singer Hernan "Chico" Ramos and later covered by Banda Blanca, whose lyrics include verses in both Garifuna and Spanish. The song was released by Sonotone Music in 1991 and achieved international success, peaking at number one on the Billboard Top Latin Songs in the United States. The track included elements of Garifuna music and punta, and has been used as a promotion for the Ladino region of Honduras.

The song debuted on the Billboard Top Latin Songs chart (formerly Hot Latin Tracks) chart at number fifteen in the week of 19 January 1991, climbing to the top ten the following week. "Sopa de Caracol" peaked at number one on 16 March 1991, replacing "Te Pareces Tanto a Él" by Chilean singer Myriam Hernández and being succeeded by "No Basta" by Venezuelan singer-songwriter Franco De Vita two weeks later. The song ended 1991 as the fifth best-performing Latin single of the year in the United States, was awarded the Silver Seagull at the Viña del Mar International Song Festival, and received a Lo Nuestro Award nomination for Tropical/Salsa Song of the Year, which it lost to Juan Luis Guerra's "Burbujas de Amor". Its music video was directed by Chad Domenencis and received a nomination in the Latin field for Best Duo or Group and Best Director at the 1991 Billboard Music Video Awards. Los Fabulosos Cadillacs, Banda Maguey, Los Flamers, Wilkins, and Tony Camargo have all recorded cover versions of the track.

== Banda Blanca version ==
=== Commercial performance ===
Weekly chart performance by "Sopa de Caracol" (Banda Blanca)
Chart (1991)	Peak position
Billboard Top Latin Songs	1

Year-end chart performance for "Sopa de Caracol" (Banda Blanca)
Chart (1991)	Peak position
Billboard Top Latin Songs	5

=== Sales ===
Region	Certification	Certified units/sales
United States	—	1,500,000

== Elvis Crespo version ==
"Sopa de Caracol – Yupi"

Single by Elvis Crespo featuring Pitbull

from the album One Flag
- Released: July 30, 2013
- Recorded: 2013
- Genre: Latin
- Length: 3:38
- Label: Venemusic
- Songwriters: Hernán Chico Ramos; Juan Pilo Tejeda

Elvis Crespo singles chronology
"Pegadito Suavacito" (2012)	"Sopa de Caracol – Yupi" (2013)	"A Celebrar" (2013)

Pitbull singles chronology
"Can't Believe It" (2013)	"Sopa de Caracol" (2013)	"Seize the Night" (2013)

In 2013, Puerto Rican-American singer Elvis Crespo and Cuban-American rapper Pitbull covered "Sopa de Caracol" and released it as a single on 30 July 2013 on Crespo's studio album One Flag. Their version peaked at #41 on the Billboard Hot Latin Songs and #1 on the Tropical Songs charts.

=== Chart performance ===
Chart (2013)	Peak position
US Hot Latin Songs (Billboard)	41
US Tropical Airplay (Billboard)	1
Venezuela (Record Report)	29

== See also ==
- List of number-one Billboard Hot Latin Tracks of 1991
- Billboard Top Latin Songs Year-End Chart
- List of best-selling Latin singles
