= Belize National Dance Company =

Belize National Dance Company (also known as the Belize Dance Company) is a Belizean cultural preservation organization which strives to represent Belize and its many ethnic groups in classical, contemporary and traditional folk dancing.

== History ==
In October 1990, the Belize National Dance Company was founded by Gregory TA Vernon and a group of dancers which included Rosita Baltazar, Eleanor Bodden-Gillett, Joel Cayetano, Lydia Harris (now Thurton), Bernard Matute, Matthew Martinez, Liza Pagayo, Rodney Peck, Sharette Perotte, Norman Rodriguez, Althea Sealy and Ramon Vargas. Initially, their trainer was Cuban professor Edwardo Rivero, who came to Belize to help teach ballet and contemporary styles. The company incorporated local folk dancing into their performance pieces, which represent the major ethnic groups of the country including Caribbean, Creole, Garifuna, Hispanic Belizean, Mayan and Middle Eastern folk dances.

Since 2010, the Company's Managing Director has been Denese Enriquez, artistic director is Althea Sealy, and for many years the assistant artistic director and director of junior branches was Rosita Baltazar. In 1998, the San Pedro Dance Company followed two years later by The Caye Caulker Dance Company were formed as junior dance organizations.

The initial group of 16 dancers expanded to around 80 dancers and has traveled throughout the world including performances in the Caribbean, Costa Rica, France, Malaysia, Mexico, Spain and the United States. They present two annual performances in Belize one around the time of the Company's anniversary and one around the time of spring break, typically allowing six months of preparation between performances. As well as performing, the Company is a school of dance, and dancers also choreograph routines for other cultural events throughout the country.

== Sources ==
- Heusner, Karla (14 October 2005). "Belize Dance Company celebrates 15th anniversary". Belize City, Belize: News Channel 5.
- Humes, Aaron (23 October 2015). "25 years of the Belize National Dance Company". San Ignacio, Belize: Breaking News Belize.
- Parks, Rowland A. (11 November 2014). "Belize National Dance Company celebrates 24 years with Souls in Motion". Belize City, Belize: Amandala.
- Ramos, Adele (10 July 2015). "Iconic Belizean dancer, Rosita Baltazar, 55, to be laid to rest Friday". Belize City, Belize: Amandala.
- "Caye Caulker Dance Company???". Vol. 1, no. 3. Caye Caulker, Belize: Conch Telegraph. 30 June 2000.
- "Miss Honduras wins the 2015/2016 Reina de La Costa Maya Pageant". San Pedro, Belize: The San Pedro Sun. 7 August 2015.
- "San Pedro Dance Company debuts". San Pedro, Belize: The San Pedro Sun. 4 December 1998.
- "Belize Dance Company: 15 Years of Dance". Belize City, Belize: 7 News Belize. October 21, 2005.
