= Disability in Belize =

Around 35,000 people in Belize have a disability. There are efforts to raise awareness about people with disabilities in Belize and counter social stigma. Several non-governmental organizations, including Special Olympics, help increase awareness and the government sponsors an annual Disability Week. Services for people with disabilities is limited and most areas of the country have limited accessibility.

== Demographics ==
An estimate of 35,000 people in Belize have a disability. Around 13 percent of all adults in Belize have a mental illness. Estimates in 2009 show around 12,670 to 15,000 Belizians are deaf. The leading causes of blindness in Belize are cataracts, glaucoma and diabetic retinopathy.

One-third of children in Belize are at risk of developing or acquiring a disability. In 2000, it was reported that around 8.5 percent of children with disabilities have a speech or language disorder.

Deaf Belizians use American Sign Language (ASL).

== Policy ==
The Ministry of Human Development, Social Transformation and Poverty Alleviation (MHDSTPA) is the agency that works with people with disabilities in Belize. The Ministry of Health spends around 2 percent of its budget on mental health services. The healthcare system provided by the government does not cover eye care.

For people who become disabled after being employed, there are pensions, grants and benefits available.

The Ministry of Education promotes awareness about issues faced by people with disabilities in Belize through "Disability Week."

== Non-governmental organizations ==
Most non-governmental organizations serving people with disabilities in Belize operate independently and do not coordinate with one another often. Funding is limited. Registered non-governmental organizations who have a valid certificate of good standing have the legal right to participate in the election of the Senator representing NGOs in Belize's Senate, also known as the 13th Senator.

The Community Agency for Rehabilitation and Education (CARE) was formed in 2002 after the Government of Belize did not have the resources to provide for services for people with disabilities. CARE provides community rehabilitation services to individuals in Belize and focuses on children and HIV/AIDS awareness for people who are blind or deaf.

The Belize Assembly for Persons with Diverse Abilities (BAPDA) started providing individuals with a National Disability Identification Card in 2019. These cards allow individuals to access special services for people with disabilities at various participating locations. BAPDA advocates for the rights of people with disabilities and lobbies the government on these issues. BAPDA has also launched a campaign called "Live and Let Live" where people with disabilities share their experiences with discrimination.

Special Olympics International started partnering with the Government of Belize in 2008. Special Olympics is helping to raise awareness about people with disabilities in Belize. Special Olympic games take place during Disabilities Awareness Week in Belize and include a torch run throughout the country. In 2019, there were 750 children with disabilities registered for the Special Olympics.

Individuals needing eye care can access these services through the Belize Council for the Visually Impaired (BCVI). The country had four ophthalmologists as of 2019, one working for BCVI. Support services for children with visual impairment are also available, including early childhood intervention.

== Legislation ==
The Mental Health Act of 1957 is the law used to regulate mental health services in the country. People who are considered by a magistrate to be of "unsound mind" may be placed into a mental institution.

Belize ratified the Convention on the Rights of Persons with Disabilities on June 2, 2011.

As of 2018, there are no laws in Belize that prevent discrimination in employment based on disability status.

People who are deaf are legally not allowed to earn a driver's license in Belize. Mennonites who are deaf are also not legally allowed to drive a farm tractor.

== Education ==
Deaf education was introduced in 1958, and taught with American Sign Language.

Special education in Belize was established by the Ministry of Education in 1991 or 1994. This special education unit was renamed the National Resource Center for Inclusive Education (NaRCIE) in 2007. Policies that support education inclusion and align with the Convention on the Rights of the Child and also on the Convention on the Rights of Persons with Disabilities were created and signed into law in 2000. However, the ability to implement these policies is not always readily available. In addition, the policies of inclusive education for children with special needs have not been written into law.

Teachers that need a degree in special education have limited resources due to a lack of local training in the country. However, NaRCIE does train teachers and parents on how to work with children with special needs. NaRCIE sets up regular workshops around the country to meet these needs.

Other types of professional support come from itinerant resource officers (IRO) who are trained by NaRCIE. IRO's work with children with special needs, evaluating their progress and setting goals for their education.

== Accessibility ==
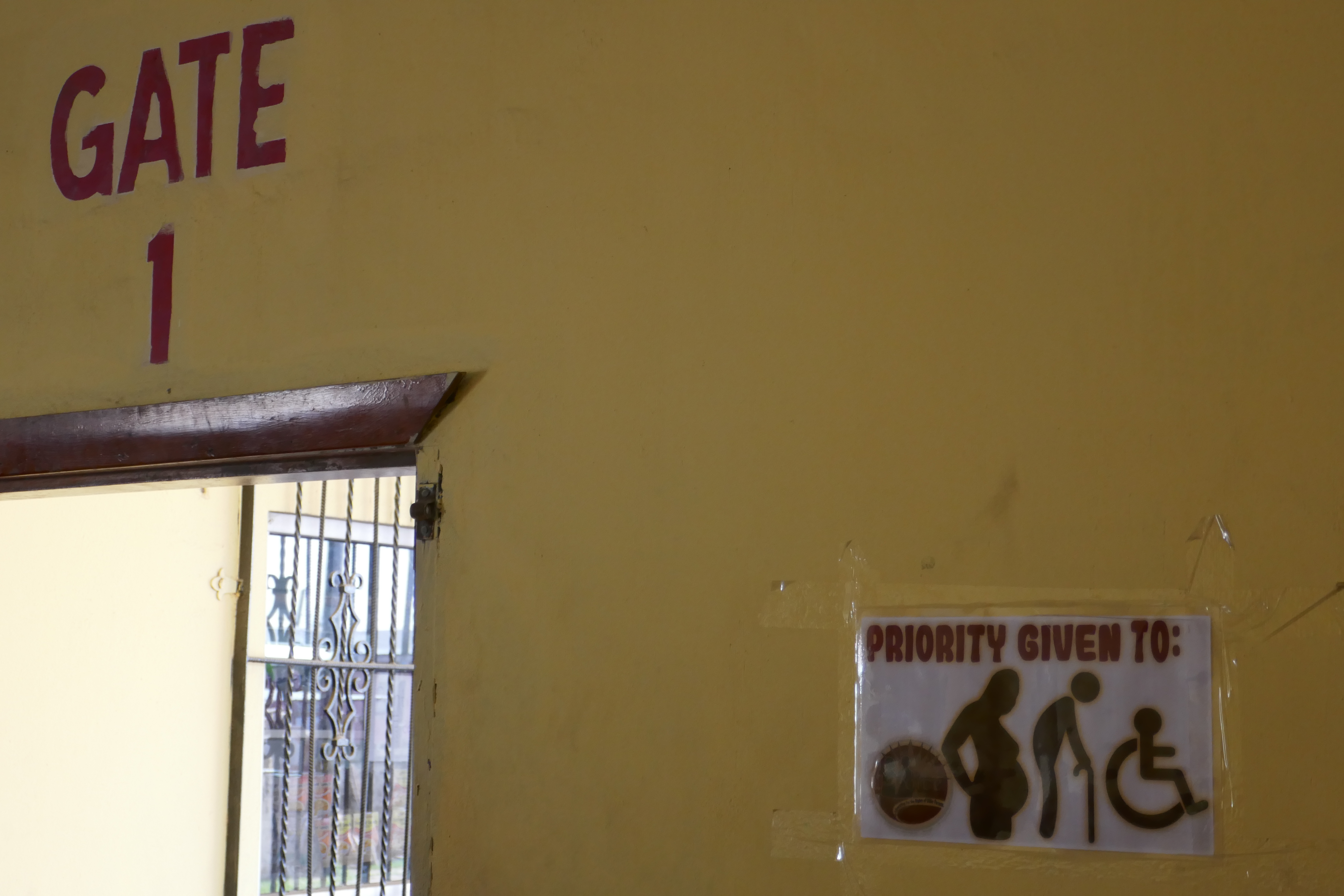
Sign in Dangriga bus station, 2018.

According to Frommer's, Belize is not very accessible to people with disabilities. Lonely Planet also writes that most buildings and restrooms in Belize are not equipped to accommodate people with disabilities.

The Belize Zoo is fully accessible to people with disabilities.

Schools are often not physically equipped to accommodate students with disabilities.

There are no regular service to provide prosthesis to people who need them in Belize, nor is there a government program to help people seeking this technology. Prosthetic clinics are set up by non-governmental organizations such as the Belize Assembly for People with Diverse Abilities (BAPDA) and Prosthetic Hope International (PHI).

Access to physical therapy and other rehabilitation services is very limited as human resources are not sufficient. A study performed in 2020 revealed that physiotherapists in Belize brings great diversity in ethnicity and training. Collectively, few are educated at the masters or doctorate level, but most have many years of clinical experience and additional education and training. While 16 consider physiotherapy their primary occupation, fewer than half are formally licensed by the Belize Ministry of Health to practice. They are entrepreneurial and active in direct patient care, typically working Monday through Friday in private outpatient and home health settings within the densely populated regions of Belize. Most physiotherapists in Belize believe more awareness and governmental investment is needed so that more people can have access to physiotherapy services for the betterment of society. (reference: Hartman J, Johnson LJ, Holder T. Physiotherapy in Belize I. A Descriptive Analysis of the Belize Physiotherapy Workforce. BJM 2021, 10(2):3-11.)

== Cultural attitudes ==
Parents often feel that having deaf children is a sign of divine punishment. According to a 2005 study on children with disabilities in Belize, it was found that such children were subject to abuse and neglect, including being tied up and beaten. Many were not being provided for adequately by their families, especially in cases when a family had more than one child with a disability. Many children with disabilities, when included in classrooms with other children find themselves facing social stigma. Deaf children are sometimes not allowed or encouraged to attend school.

Because of low literacy rates, deaf people are often unable to use writing to communicate with individuals who do not know sign language.
