= Wátina =

Watína

Studio album by Andy Palacio & the Garifuna Collective
- Genre: Paranda (music)
- Label: Cumbancha
- Producer: Ivan Duran

Wátina is the final album by Belizean musician, Andy Palacio, released in 2007 on the Cumbancha label. A member of the Garifuna people, Palacio utilizes grooves and melodies that are deeply rooted in Garifuna traditions. Backed by a multigenerational group of Garifuna players, Andy Palacio put together an album that gained massive success and spread Garifuna culture around the world. Wátina is considered an important piece of cultural preservation for a people group who find themselves sometimes in fear their that their culture is at risk of extinction. The album is seen as "a monumental tribute to the Garifuna of yesterday and tomorrow." The album reached #1 on the World Music Charts Europe in June 2007. Due to Wátina's success, Andy Palacio was named a UNESCO Artist for Peace and shared the 2007 WOMEX Award with Ivan Duran.

== Recognition ==
- Amazon.com 100 Greatest World Music Albums of All Time (#1)
- OMM's Top 50 Albums of the Decade (#44)

== Track List ==
No.	Title	Length
1.	"Watina"	4:44
2.	"Weyu Larigi Weyu"	4:23
3.	"Miami"	3:46
4.	"Baba"	4:02
5.	"Lidan Aban"	4:45
6.	"Gaganbadiba"	4:19
7.	"Beiba"	4:08
8.	"Sin Precio"	3:16
9.	"Yagane"	2:25
10.	"Aguyuha Niduhenu"	5:14
11.	"Ayo Da"	3:29
12.	"Amuyengu"	5:27
