= List of best-selling Latin singles =

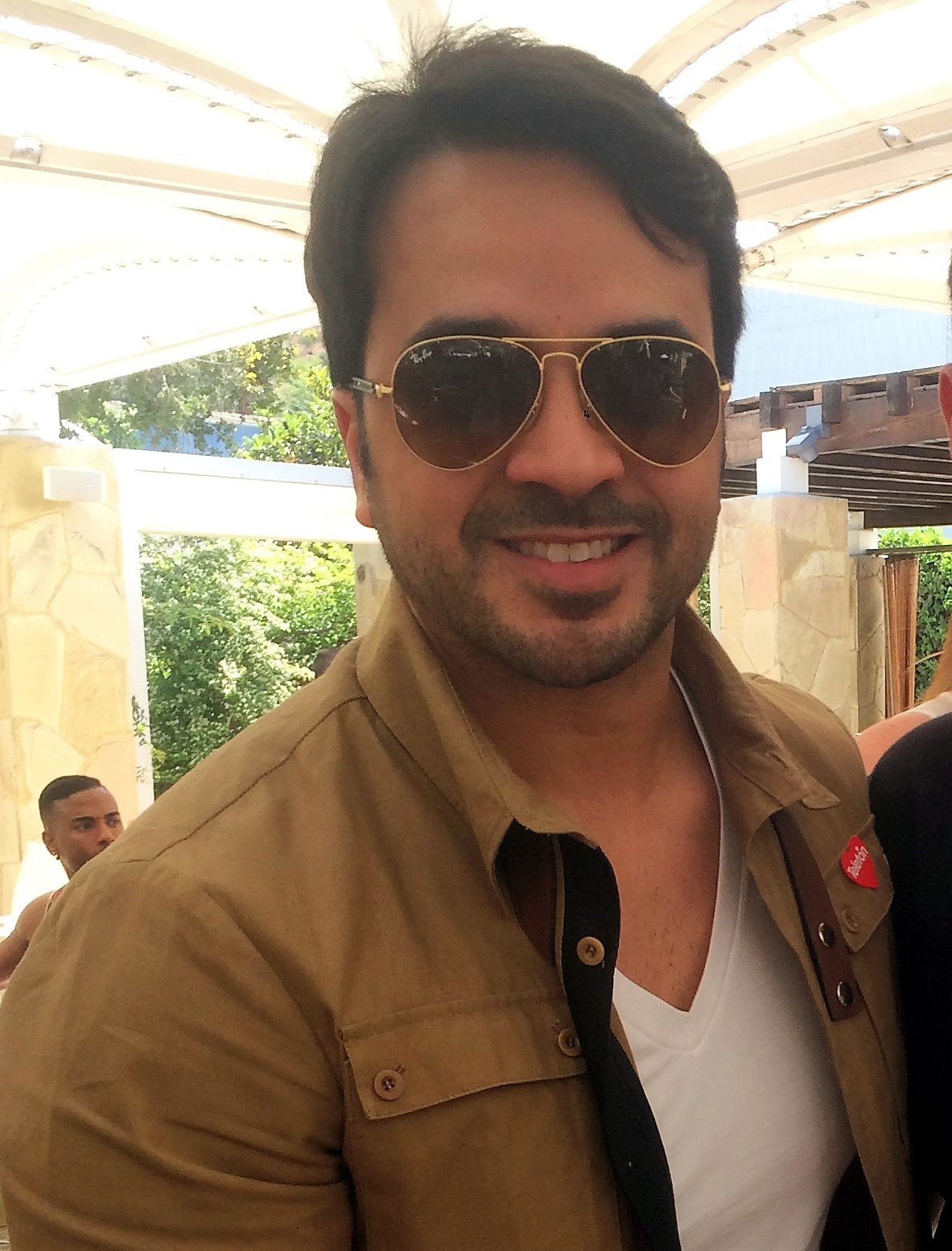
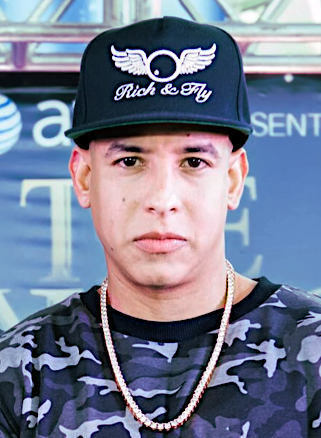
Luis Fonsi and Daddy Yankee have the best-selling Latin single of all-time with "Despacito".

Latin music has an ambiguous meaning in the music industry due to differing definitions of the term "Latin". For example, the Latin music market in the United States defines Latin music as any release that is mostly sung in Spanish, regardless of genre or artist nationality, by industry organizations including the Recording Industry Association of America (RIAA) and Billboard. International organizations and trade groups such as the Latin Recording Academy include Portuguese-language music in the Latin category.

Music journalists and musicologists define Latin music as musical styles from Spanish-speaking areas of Latin America and from Spain. Music from Brazil is usually included in the genre and music from Portugal is occasionally included.

As a result of the conflicting views of defining Latin music, the list includes Latin singles defined either by language for vocal songs or genre for instrumental recordings. Therefore, for a single to appear on the list, the figure must have been published by a reliable source, the single must have sold at least 1.5 million copies and must have at least 51% of its content in Spanish or Portuguese. (Note: This is the same metric Billboard, the RIAA, and the Latin Recording Academy uses to categorize a recording as "Latin".) For non Spanish- or Portuguese-language songs, it must have ranked on either the Billboard Latin Digital Song Sales (or any of its subgenre digital charts) or receive a Latin certification from the RIAA.

Sales for Latin singles prior to the digital era are often difficult to verify due to most Latin singles having been only released as promotional singles for radio stations. For example, Billboard did not track sales of Latin digital songs until it was introduced in the issue dated January 23, 2010 and merges all versions of a song sold from digital music distributors.

Two best-selling singles lists are displayed here relating first to physical singles (mainly CD and vinyl singles) and second to digital singles (digitally downloaded tracks which first became available to purchase in the early 2000s).

According to Guinness World Records, Los del Río's "Macarena" (1993) is the best-selling Latin single worldwide, with estimated sales of over 10 million copies as of February 2000. The song's success was before the existence of digital sales and streaming.

== Best-selling physical Latin singles ==
=== 5 million copies or more ===
Artist	Single	Released	Language(s)	Sales (in millions)	Source
Los del Río	"Macarena"	1993	Spanish	14	
Las Ketchup	"The Ketchup Song (Aserejé)"^{[a]}	2002	Spanish • English	12	
Mocedades	"Eres tú"	1973	Spanish	8	
Peret	"Borriquito"	1971	Spanish	6.6	
Manolo Escobar	"Y Viva España"	1973	Spanish	6	
Jeanette	"Porque te vas"	1974	Spanish	6	
Kaoma	"Lambada"	1989	Portuguese	6	
Mario Millán Medina	"El rancho'e la Cambicha"	1950	Spanish	5	
Ricky Martin	"María"	1995	Spanish	5	
Enrique Iglesias	"Bailamos"	1999	Spanglish	5	
Stan Getz and João Gilberto featuring Antônio Carlos Jobim and Astrud Gilberto	"Garota de Ipanema (The Girl from Ipanema)"	1964	Portuguese • English	5	

=== 1.5–4.99 million copies ===
Artist	Single	Released	Language(s)	Sales (in millions)	Source
Miguel Ríos	"Himno a la Alegría (A Song of Joy)"	1969	Spanish • English	4	
ABBA	"Chiquitita" (Spanish version)	1979	Spanish	2.2 (Note: Attributed to Latin American sales alone)	
Lucho Gatica	"La novia"	1961	Spanish	2	
Los Ramblers	"El Rock del Mundial"	1961	Spanish	2	
Juan Gabriel	"Querida"	1984	Spanish	2 (Note: Mexican sales alone)	
Luis Miguel	"Sol, Arena y Mar"	1999	Spanish	2	
Miami Sound Machine	"Conga"	1985	English	2	
Los Lobos	"La Bamba"	1987	Spanish	2 (Note: Attributed to American sales alone)	
Azúcar Moreno	"Ven, Devórame Otra Vez"	1990	Spanish	2	
Aventura	"Obsesión"	2002	Spanish	2 (Note: Attributed to European sales alone)	
José José	"Si Me Dejas Ahora"	1979	Spanish	1.5	
Ángela Carrasco	"Quererte a ti"	1979	Spanish	1.5	
Los Bukis	"Tu Cárcel"	1987	Spanish	1.5	
Banda Blanca	"Sopa de Caracol"	1991	Spanish • Garifuna	1.5 (Note: Attributed to American sales alone)	

== Best-selling Latin digital singles ==
Artist	Single	Released	Language(s)	Sales (in millions)	Source
Luis Fonsi and Daddy Yankee	"Despacito"	2017	Spanish • English	36.1^{[b]}	
Enrique Iglesias featuring Sean Paul, Descemer Bueno and Gente de Zona	"Bailando"	2014	Spanish	8	
Michel Teló	"Ai Se Eu Te Pego"	2011	Portuguese	7.2	
Don Omar and Lucenzo	"Danza Kuduro"	2010	Spanish • Portuguese	5	
Shakira featuring Alejandro Sanz	"La Tortura"	2005	Spanish	5	
Shakira	"Loca"	2010	Spanish • English	5	
Pitbull	"I Know You Want Me (Calle Ocho)"	2009	Spanglish	2.6 (Note: American sales alone)	

=== By stream equivalent units ===
Beginning in 2020, the International Federation of the Phonographic Industry began reporting the best-selling singles of each year in terms of subscription streams equivalent units. The methodology used converts all digital formats, including digital download sales, paid subscription streaming, and free ad-supported streaming, into a single figure.

Artist	Single	Released	Language(s)	Sales (in millions)	Source
Yng Lvcas and Peso Pluma	"La Bebé"	2021	Spanish	1.45	
Bad Bunny and Chencho Corleone	"Me Porto Bonito"	2022	Spanish	1.21	
Karol G and Shakira	"TQG"	2023	Spanish	1.18	
Bad Bunny	"Tití Me Preguntó"	2022	Spanish	1.14	
Bad Bunny	"DTMF"	2025	Spanish	1.02	
FloyyMenor and Cris MJ	"Gata Only"	2023	Spanish	0.98	
Farruko	"Pepas"	2021	Spanish	0.94	
Karol G	"Provenza"	2022	Spanish	0.92	

== Multiple versions ==
=== Cover versions ===
Artist	Single	Released	Language(s)	Sales (in millions)	Source
Various artists (Note: Cover versions of the songs)	"Oye Cómo Va"	1962	Spanish	5	

=== Multilingual versions ===
Songs that were originally recorded in another language with a Spanish-language version also recorded. For a song to appear on this list, its Spanish-language version must have ranked on the Billboard Latin Digital Song Sales chart.

Artist	Single	Released	Original language	Spanish-language version	Sales (in millions)	Source
Shakira featuring Wyclef Jean	"Hips Don't Lie"	2006	English	"Hips Don't Lie" (Spanish version)	10	
Shakira featuring Freshlyground	"Waka Waka (This Time for Africa)"	2010	English	"Waka Waka (Esto es Africa)"	10	
Jennifer Lopez featuring Pitbull	"On the Floor"	2011	English	"Ven a Bailar"	8.4	
Ricky Martin	"Livin' la Vida Loca"	1999	English	"Livin' la Vida Loca" (Spanish version)	8	
Shakira	"She Wolf"	2009	English	"Loba"	1.8 (Note: Attributed to American sales alone)	

== See also ==
- List of best-selling Latin music artists
- List of best-selling Latin albums
- List of best-selling singles

== Notes ==
- a. For both the English and Spanish versions.
- b. Sales figure includes 'equivalent track streams'.
