= Hunguhungu =

Hunguhungu or fedu is a form of traditional swaying circular dance performed by the women of the Garifuna people of Belize, Honduras, Nicaragua and Guatemala. The music for the dance is composed of rhythmic themes performed by three drummers with alternating call-and-response chanting, and displays a clear African heritage. It is sometimes combined with punta.

The hunguhungu is sometimes performed during a ritual called the adugurahani, or dugu, used by the Garifuna to communicate with their deceased ancestors. The dance is also performed by adult Garifuna women during the Holy Week of Easter to indicate sorrow or lamentation, and often contains topical elements expressive of the women's feelings toward current situations in their communities, with serious messages such as "A man who commits a crime, will only end up dead", or "A man who commits a crime, some day by the vultures circling overhead, we will find his body."

== See also ==
- Music of Belize
- Music of Honduras
- Music of Nicaragua
- Garifuna music
