= List of newspapers in Belize =

This is a list of newspapers in Belize.

== Major newspapers ==
- Amandala, established in 1969, offers a mix of national news, sports, and editorial opinion
- The Belize Times, official newspaper of the People's United Party
- The Guardian, official newspaper of the United Democratic Party
- The Reporter, weekly independent newspaper established in 1967

== Minor newspapers ==
- Ambergris Today: rival to The San Pedro Sun on Ambergris Caye
- Caye Caulker Chronicles: chief paper for village of Caye Caulker
- The Placencia Breeze: tourism paper for Placencia
- The San Pedro Daily: online newspaper
- The San Pedro Sun: respected source for San Pedro
- The Wabagari Post: local newspaper of Dangriga Town

== Defunct newspapers ==
- The Alliance Weekly: weekly newspaper published in Belize City (1990s)
- The Beacon: weekly newspaper published in Belize City (1980s)
- The Independent: soft news and opinions (2006–2007)
- The National Perspective: based in Belmopan (2008–2011)
- Star: local newspaper of Cayo District (2004–2016)
- Honduras Gazette: weekly newspaper published in Belize City (1826 to sometime during 1829‍–‍1838)

== See also ==
- List of television stations in Belize
