= Honduras Gazette =

First newspaper in Belize

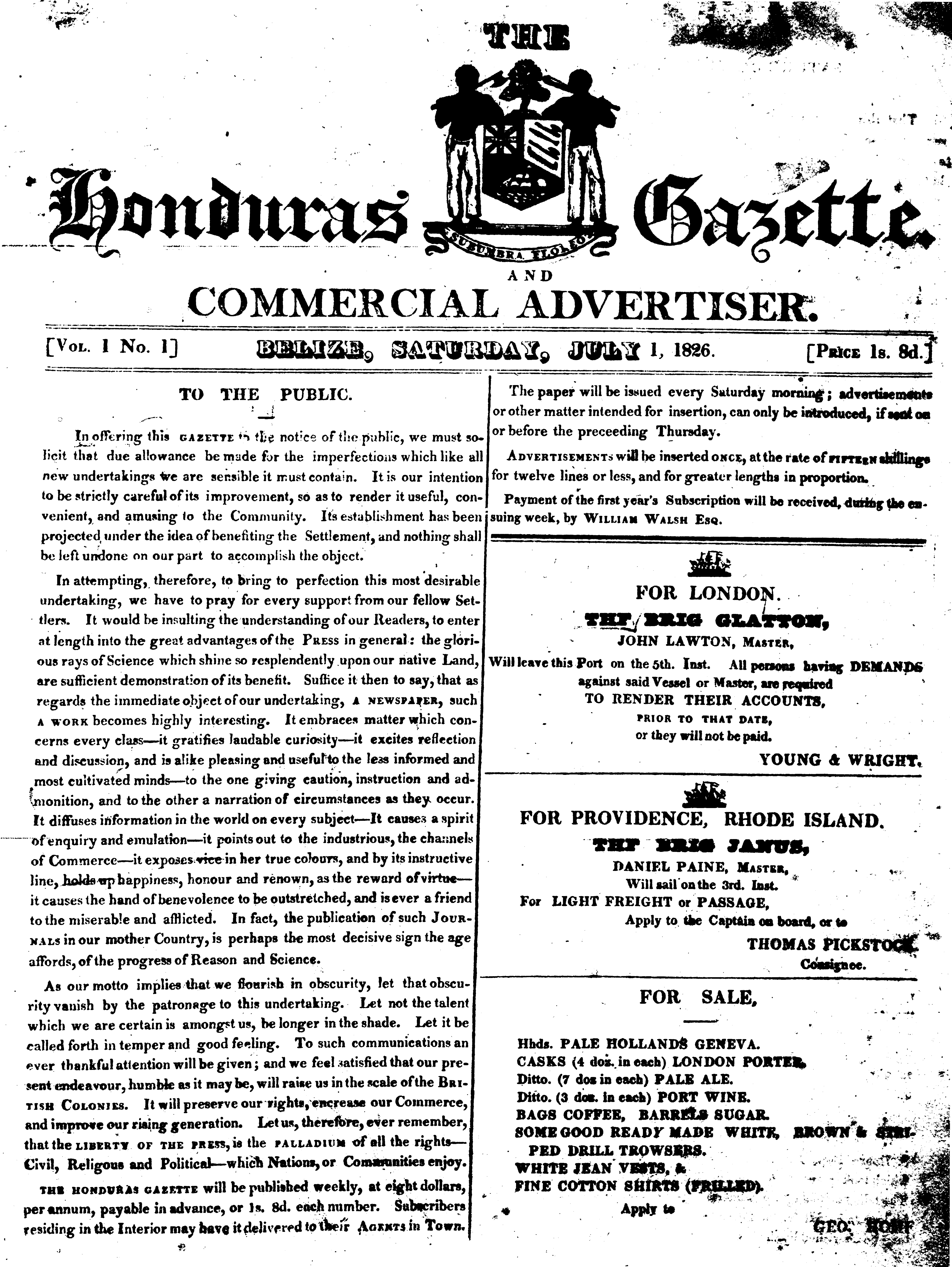
- First front page of the Honduras Gazette
- Type: Weekly newspaper
- Format: Tabloid
- Founder: Magistrates (Note: Also Magistracy, Magistrates. A group of members of the Public Meeting (Note: The direct legislative body of the Bay settlement; first such, and predecessor of the Legislative Assembly; (Note: The representative legislative body of the Bay settlement; successor of the Public Meeting; akin to a representative town meeting or the later parliament.) akin to an open town meeting.) or later Legislative Assembly who formed the government of the Bay settlement; first such, and akin to the later cabinet.) of the Bay settlement
- Publisher: James Cruickshank (Note: To vol. 2 no. 88.); Henry Whitney (Note: From vol. 2 no. 89.)
- Editor: Magistrates (Note: To vol. 1 no. 37.); Cruickshank (Note: To vol. 2 no. 88.); Parliamentary committee (Note: From vol. 2 no. 89.)
- Founded: 1 July 1826
- Ceased publication: in 1829–1838
- Relaunched: 29 September 1838 (Note: As the Belize Advertiser.)
- City: Belize Town
- Country: Bay settlement
- Price: $8 per annum; 1/8 per issue (Note: Jamaican currency was the legal tender of the Bay settlement in the 1820s. At the time, Jamaica rejected anchor dollars in favour of Spanish silver dollars, worth eight Spanish reals each; £sd value fixed by authorities at 6/3 Pounds sterling per dollar by the 1720s, but fixed by local custom in both Jamaica and Honduras at 4/– per dollar by the 1820s.)
- OCLC number: 28171403
- Free online archives: vol. 1 no. 1 to vol. 2 no. 88

The Honduras Gazette, published as The Honduras Gazette and Commercial Advertiser, was the first newspaper in the Bay settlement, now Belize, launched on 1 July 1826. It was published weekly in tabloid format, and served as the settlement's newspaper of record, given it had no competing periodicals. The publication also served as the settlement's government gazette, as it was established by the Bench of Magistrates, following their purchase of a printing press in late 1825, fulfilled by printer James Cruickshank in early 1826. The Gazette is thought to have had a limited print circulation. It was privatised by the Legislative Assembly in early 1827, and ceased publication at some uncertain date during 1829 to 1838. It was succeeded by the Belize Advertiser in late 1838.

Like other West Indian papers, the Gazette covered official proceedings, local and overseas news, and shipping and mercantile intelligence. Unlike said peers though, the paper further reported, often critically, on affairs in the newly independent Hispanic countries which bordered the settlement, namely the First Mexican Republic and the Federal Republic of Central America. This coverage was picked up by succeeding 19th-century periodicals of the settlement, and is said to have brought the same to greater attention in the press of the said Hispanic republics.

== History ==
Belize Town (background) from Fort George (Note: In modern Fort George, Belize City, at 17.493°N 88.182°W.) (foreground) in 1830, with the 1st West India Regiment manning the fort

From the 17th to early 19th centuries, during the country's Precolonial period, the Baymen of the Bay settlement (also known simply as Honduras) are thought to have looked to overseas printing presses and periodicals in London and British America for their printing needs. By the 1820s though, this lack of a press had apparently become untenable, such that on 6 December 1825, the settlement's Bench of Magistrates resolved to procure one "for the purpose of printing and preserving the records and laws of the Settlement". Consequently, an iron letterpress was set up in Belize Town by printer James Cruickshank, whose first substantive work is thought to have been an almanac, namely the Honduras Almanack, published "by authority of the Magistrates" on 9 March 1826.

=== Establishment ===
The first issue of the Gazette was published on 1 July 1826. It contained an introductory announcement to the public, shipping notices, overseas and domestic news, government notices, and various commercial advertisements. In the said announcement, the paper's editors noted that the Gazette had been launched "under the idea of benefiting the Settlement", and committed themselves to rendering the same "useful, convenient, and amusing to the Community". The editors expounded on the advantages of an impartial press, adding "we feel satisfied that our present endeavour, humble as it may be, will raise us in the scale of the British Colonies. It will preserve our rights, encrease our Commerce, and improve our rising generation. Let us, therefore, ever remember, that the liberty of the press, is the palladium of all the rights—Civil, Religious and Political—which Nations, or Communities enjoy". The announcement ended with logistical information regarding subscriptions and advertising.

=== Run ===
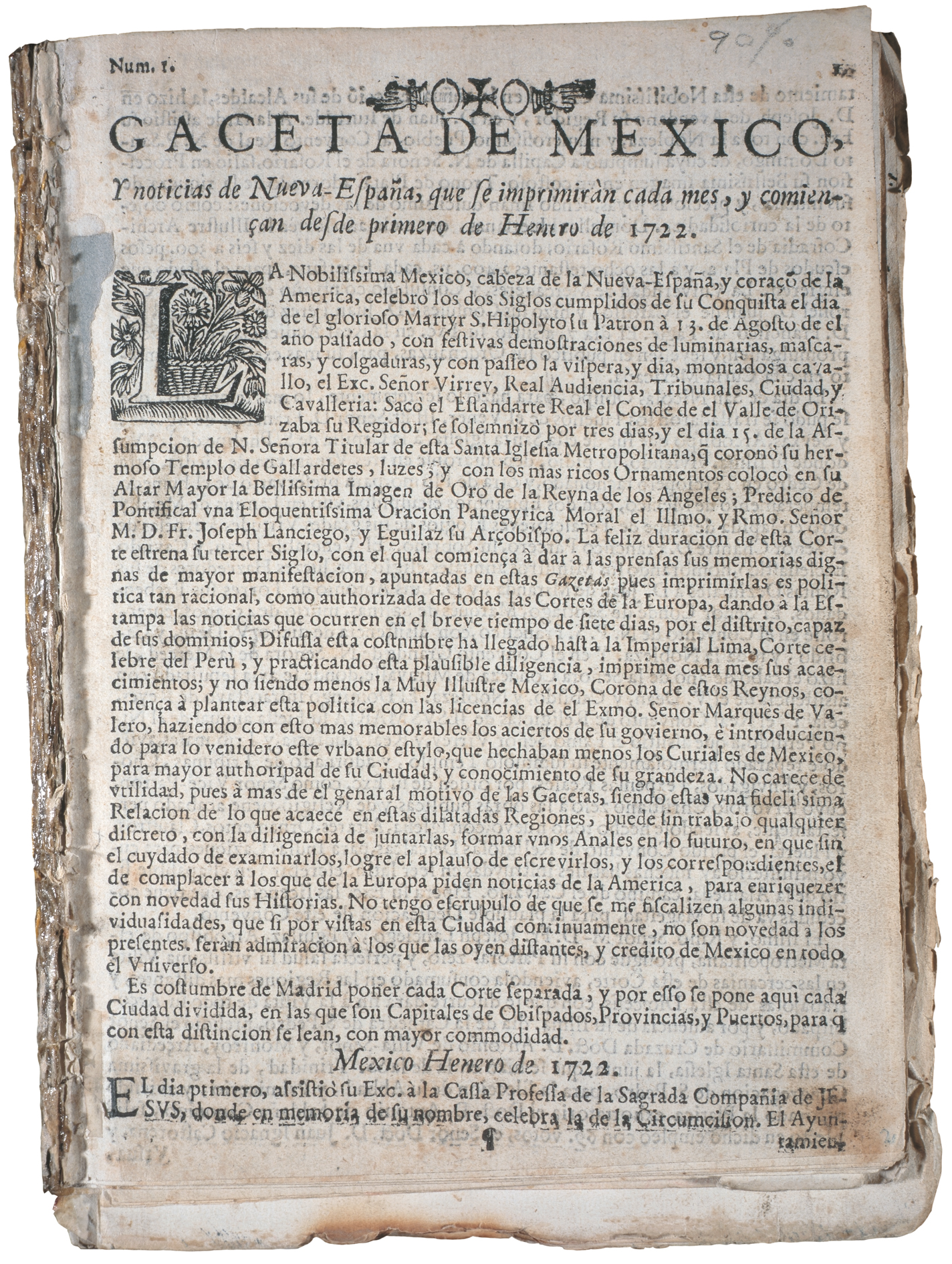
The Gaceta de Mexico, based in Mexico, was the first newspaper in New Spain, launched in 1722 (first front page shown). It was followed by the Gazeta de Goathemala in Spanish Guatemala in 1729. (Note: Also Gaceta de Guatemala. See Gaceta de Guatemala.)

The Gazette issues were normally printed in tabloid format, usually in four pages of 12 1/4 by 9 5/8 inches (311.2 by 244.5 mm), with copy laid out in two columns. Issues were sometimes supplemented. They were published weekly, usually on Saturdays. The Gazette is thought to have been edited by the settlement's magistrates until 17 March 1827 (volume 1, issue number 38), following a 5 March resolution by the Legislative Assembly to privatise the paper. Cruickshank took up editorial duties at the Gazette until 5 November of that year (volume 2, issue number 88), "when, on that day, the Legislative Assembly at their Meeting, in their Wisdom, took it out of his hands, by reason of his intemperence, and very properly appointed a Committee, for its better Government".

In terms of coverage, the Gazette mostly focussed on local occurrences and legislative and judicial proceedings, though like peer West Indian papers, it further published government notices, shipping intelligence, and overseas and foreign occurrences gleaned from British, American, and West Indian papers. Especial attention was, however, paid to reports received from neighbouring Hispanic republics, which is to say the successor states of New Spain following Spanish American independence, namely Mexico and Central America. According to Victoria University of Wellington professor Roderick Cave, the Gazette's readers were evidently taken by the "decidedly unsettled affairs" of their newly independent neighbours. In a similar vein, Université Jean-Monnet-Saint-Étienne scholar Raphaël Roché notes that such Hispanic affairs were extraordinarily reported on (for West Indian press) in each of the paper's first 88 issues (at least), including in editorials. Roché further characterises the paper's early commentary (in its first 31 issues, to 27 January 1827) as "very critical" of the viability or even existence of the new Hispanic republics, though considers later coverage on the matter more factual and analytic. As compared to contemporary Hispanic press nearby, to Roché, the Gazette's editorials were more sharp, strident or even belligerent, and the paper covered mercantile affairs much more so than political ones. For instance, some of its commercial ads were even published in Spanish rather than English, with copy likely written or translated by a slave or indentured servant fluent in the language.

In terms of circulation, the Gazette is thought to have had a small subscriber base, given its small audience (under 4,000 people) and relatively high cost of subscription ($8 per annum). This shortfall was likely made up for by advertising revenue though, which is thought to have been sufficient to cover costs, given the relatively high cost of placing ads in the paper. Despite its limited run, at least some issues are known to have circulated in nearby British settlements in the Bay Islands and the Mosquito Shore, and further overseas in the West Indies, England and the new-found United States.

=== Disestablishment ===
It is not certain when exactly the Gazette ceased publication, though its run is thought to have ended sometime during the 1829 to 1838 period. A copy of the issue for 27 June 1829 is the latest extant copy known to date. The paper was succeeded on 29 September 1838 by the Belize Advertiser.

== Legacy ==
Cave deems the Gazette's keen coverage of Hispanic affairs in neighbouring Mexico and Central America as precedent-setting, given that later periodicals of the 19th century in the Bay settlement and later British Honduras carried on the tradition. Roché argues that the paper or its coverage brought the "illicit" (to Spanish and later Hispanic authorities) British settlement to greater attention in nearby Hispanic republics, as 19th century press of the latter had largely ignored the Bay settlement until after the Gazette launched.

== See also ==
- List of newspapers in Belize
- List of British colonial gazettes

== Notes and references ==
=== References ===
1. anon. (1 July 1826). "vol 1 no 1". Honduras Gazette. Belize: James Cruickshank. pp. 1–4.
2. anon. (17 March 1827). "vol 1 no 38". Honduras Gazette. Belize: James Cruickshank. pp. 1–4, with supplement pp. 1-4.
3. anon. (11 July 1829a). "Guatemala". Newbern Sentinel. Vol. XII, no. 587. New Bern, N. Car.: Thomas Watson. p. 2.
4. anon. (6 August 1829b). "London Mails". Cheltenham Chronicle. Vol. 20, no. 1041. Cheltenham, Glos., Eng.: S. Y. Griffith & G. Cunningham. p. 2.
5. Burdon, John Alder, ed. (1933). From 1801-1840. Archives of British Honduras. Vol. 2. London: Sifton, Praed & Co. hdl:2027/mdp.39015028737016. OCLC 3046003.
6. Cave, Roderick (1975). "Printing comes to Jamaica". Jamaica Journal. Vol. 9, no. 2–3. Kingston: Institute of Jamaica. pp. 11–18.
7. Cave, Roderick (1976). "Printing in Nineteenth-Century Belize". Library Quarterly. 46 (1): 20–37. doi:10.1086/620464. JSTOR 4306599. S2CID 144005676.
8. Cave, Roderick (1977). "American Bibliographical Notes : The Printing of the Honduras Almanack". Proceedings of the American Antiquarian Society. 87 (1): 195–199. ProQuest 1305089289.
9. Cave, Roderick (1978). "Early Printing and the Book Trade in the West Indies". Library Quarterly. 48 (2): 163–192. doi:10.1086/630053. JSTOR 4306937. S2CID 143968810.
10. Cundall, Frank (1916). The press and printers of Jamaica prior to 1820. Worcester, Mass.: American Antiquarian Society. hdl:2027/hvd.32044024430100. OCLC 621457.
11. Everitt, John C. (1986). "The Growth and Development of Belize City". Journal of Latin American Studies. 18 (1): 75–111. doi:10.1017/S0022216X00011172. JSTOR 157205. S2CID 145650510.
12. Landarech, Alfonso María (1967). "Historia del periodismo de Guatemala". Revista conservadora del pensamiento centroamericano. 16 (76): 14–28. OCLC 6141951.
13. Martin, Robert Montgomery (1834). Possessions in the West Indies. History of the British colonies. Vol. 2. London: Cochrane & McCrone. hdl:2027/hvd.32044009927740. OCLC 1155228020.
14. Roché, Raphaël (2021). "Mur de papier, barrière de la langue". HispanismeS. 17 (sn): sn–sn. doi:10.4000/hispanismes.13470. S2CID 246336963.
