= The Garifuna Women's Project =

- Also known as: Umalali
- Origin: Belize, Caribbean, Honduras, Guatemala
- Genre: World music
- Instruments: Vocals
- Labels: Cumbancha, Producer: Ivan Duran

Umalali: The Garifuna Women's Project is musical collection of stories, organized and produced by Ivan Duran. The album is built upon the voices of local women in Belize, Honduras, Nicaragua and Guatemala. The Garifuna people are residents of these countries' Caribbean coasts.

== Background ==
In the 1600s, shipwrecked West African Captives intermarried with the native Carib/Arawak people who asslimated into Indigenous cuture on the Caribbean island of St. Vincent and lived there until the 1790s, when most were exiled to Central America by British authorities.

== Process ==
In 1997, Ivan Duran set out to capture the stories of the Garifuna women. He began by connecting with many of the women in the various villages that he visited. After deciding the types of voices that he wanted to have on the album, Duran began setting up small recording studios in shacks by the water. The majority of the women on the album are not professional musicians, so part of Duran's task was to persuade them away from their daily tasks to record.

== Purpose ==
The Garifuna Women's Project is the natives' collection of stories, stories of "hurricanes that swept away homes and livelihoods, a son murdered in a far-off village, the pain of childbirth and other struggles and triumphs of daily life. Then there are the personal stories of the women who participated in this magical recording project: mothers and daughters who, while working tirelessly to support their families, sing songs and pass on the traditions of their people to future generations."

== Track listing ==
No.	Title	Length
1.	"Nibari (My Grandchild)"	3:41
2.	"MéRua"	3:12
3.	"Yündüya Weyu (The Sun Has Set)"	3:57
4.	"BarüBana Yagien (Take me Away)"	3:34
5.	"Hattie"	4:02
6.	"Luwübüri Sigala (Hills of Tegucigalpa)"	3:25
7.	"Anaha ya (Here I Am)"	4:14
8.	"Tuguchili Elia (Elia's Father)"	2:17
9.	"Fuleisei (Favours)"	2:02
10.	"Uruwei (The King)"	2:03
11.	"ÁFayaháDina (I Have Traveled)"	3:41
12.	"Lirun Biganute (Sad News)"	2:02
