= El Rock del Mundial =

Single by Los Ramblers

from the album Los Ramblers
- Released: May 1962
- Recorded: March 1962
- Genre: Rock and roll
- Length: 2:46
- Songwriter: Jorge Rojas
- Producer: Camilo Fernández

El Rock del Mundial is a song by Chilean band Los Ramblers that was recorded for the 1962 FIFA World Cup in Chile. It is the best-selling single in Chilean music history, with over two million copies sold.

It was written by Chilean composer Jorge Rojas and Chilean producer Camilo Fernández.

== Charts ==
Chart (1962)	Peak position
Chile (Billboard)	1

== See also ==
- List of best-selling Latin singles
- Music of Chile
