= Banda Blanca =

Honduran punta rock group

- Origin: Honduras
- Genres: Punta rock
- Years active: 1971–present
- Labels: EMI; Rodven
- Members: Julio Ardón; Óscar Gerardo Galindo; Juan Pompilio Tejeda Duarte; José Luis Rodríguez; Héctor Altamirano; Adán Rodríguez

Banda Blanca is a Honduran conjunto formed in 1971. They began as a rock band but eventually integrated elements of merengue and punta rock into their music. The group rose to fame in 1990, when their song "Sopa de Caracol" became an international success, peaking at number one on the Billboard Top Latin Songs in the United States, where it sold an estimated 1.5 million copies. Throughout their career, Banda Blanca have sold between two and five million records.

Their songs "Fiesta" and "Swing Latino" also reached American charts, and their 1991 album Baile Punta became a number-one hit on the Tropical Albums chart. That year, Banda Blanca received a Lo Nuestro award in the category Tropical – New Artist of the Year.

== Career ==
=== Beginnings ===
Banda Blanca was formed in 1971 in San Pedro Sula, Honduras. The group's name means "white band".

=== Commercial success ===
Banda Blanca rose to international fame in 1991, after the release of their signature song, "Sopa de Caracol". They also recorded a Japanese version, called "Lemeguchi". The same year, their album Baile Punta sold an estimated 100,000 copies between the United States and Puerto Rico while placing them in multiple Latin markets compiled by Cashbox record charts, such as in Venezuela, and topping the Tropical Albums chart on Billboard.

Baile Punta was promoted by a tour of the United States, attracting audiences upwards of 250,000. In the early 1990s, the band would frequently perform in the U.S. and Europe. In 1992, Banda Blanca participated in the Viña del Mar International Song Festival, winning the Gaviota de Plata award. Around this time, their estimated record sales ranged from two to five million, and they had won ten platinum and eight gold records for their sales in the U.S., Mexico, Chile, Venezuela, Puerto Rico, and Costa Rica alone. By 1993, they had recorded 23 albums.

=== Legacy ===
Banda Blanca is credited with popularizing punta, a style of Garifuna music, outside of its Central American heartland. In 1991, Cashbox magazine named them the biggest crossover fad since "Lambada" and also compared them to Juan Luis Guerra's Bachata Rosa, an album that in 1990 brought the bachata style into the mainstream. John Rice, a correspondent for AP, noted punta's roots in Belize and commented: "Garifuna musicians say their time may be coming at last, partly because of Banda Blanca's success and growing interest in punta rock among world music enthusiasts in Britain and the United States". In 1995, La Opinión's Joseph Treviño called them arguably the most popular Honduran band abroad. Adalberto Santana, author of Honduras-México: una relación horizontal (1999), said the band succeeded in introducing new rhythms to Mexico. According to publications such as BBC Mundo and El Heraldo de Mexico, "Sopa de Caracol" has maintained its popularity into the 2010s and 2020s. Additionally, the song has been covered by such artists as Elvis Crespo and Pitbull.

In 1992, Banda Blanca were named "ambassadors of Honduran music" by then-Honduran president, Rafael Callejas.

== Band members ==
- Julio Ardón – lead vocals
- Óscar Gerardo Galindo – bass guitar
- Juan Pompilio Tejeda Duarte – keyboards, backing vocals
- José Luis Rodríguez – drums
- Héctor Altamirano – guitar, backing vocals
- Adán Rodríguez – piano, keyboards, backing vocals

== Selected discography ==
- ¡Fiesta Inolvidable! Vol. 1 (1982)
- Sopa de Caracol (1990)
- Baile Punta (1991)
- Fiesta Tropical (1991)
- Alegría (1992)
- Swing Latino (1994)
- Hot, Hot, Hot (2000)
- Saben Quien Llego (2015)

== Awards and nominations ==
Award/organization	Year	Nominee/work	Category	Result	Ref.
Aplauso 98 Awards	1991	Banda Blanca	El Aplauso Award	Won	
Billboard Music Video Awards	1991	Banda Blanca	Best Duo or Group	Nominated	
Lo Nuestro Awards	1991	Banda Blanca	Tropical New Artist	Won	
Lo Nuestro Awards	1991	"Sopa de Caracol"	Tropical/Salsa Song of the Year	Nominated	
Lo Nuestro Awards	1992	Banda Blanca	Tropical Salsa Group of the Year	Nominated	
Lo Nuestro Awards	1992	Fiesta Tropical	Tropical Album of the Year	Nominated	
Lo Nuestro Awards	1992	"Fiesta"	Tropical Song of the Year	Nominated	
Lo Nuestro Awards	1992	"Fiesta"	Video of the Year	Nominated	
Viña del Mar International Song Festival	1992	Banda Blanca	Gaviota de Plata	Won	
Viña del Mar International Song Festival	1992	Banda Blanca	Gervasio Award	Won	

== See also ==
- Music of Honduras
