= Paul Nabor =

Belizean musician (1928–2014)

- Born: Alfonso Palacio; 26 January 1928; Punta Gorda, British Honduras (now Belize)
- Died: 22 October 2014 (aged 86) Punta Gorda, Belize
- Genres: Garifuna music
- Occupation: Musician
- Instrument: Guitar
- Years active: 1946–2013

Paul Nabor (26 January 1928 – 22 October 2014), born Alfonso Palacio, was a Garifuna singer and musician from Punta Gorda, Belize. He is often credited with popularizing paranda, a style of traditional Garifuna music, and is considered to have been one of the most talented musicians of the genre.

== Early life ==
Nabor was born as Alfonso Palacio on 26 January 1928. Although official sources list his place of birth as Stann Creek Town (now Dangriga), Nabor told Amandala in 2009 that he had been born in Punta Gorda, where he was a lifelong resident. Nabor began singing professionally at 18.

== Career ==
In Belize, Nabor's best known song was "Naguya Nei," which he wrote in memory of his deceased sister. Fluent in English, Spanish and Garifuna, Nabor was a popular entertainer throughout Central America.

Nabor performed on Andy Palacio's final album, Wátina, released in 2007. Nabor's music is also included on the showcase album Paranda on Stonetree Records. He retired from performing full-time in 2009, but played occasionally until 2013.

== Honours ==
On a 2004 visit to Tegucigalpa, Honduras, he was declared a distinguished guest of the city. Nabor was visiting Tegucigalpa for the Honduran release of Garifuna Soul, an album by fellow paranda musician, Aurelio Martínez.

== Death ==
On 22 October 2014, Nabor died at Punta Gorda Hospital, following a stroke the week before. He is buried at Mount Olivet Cemetery in Punta Gorda.
