= Ambergris Today =

English-language weekly newspaper

- Type: Weekly newspaper
- Format: Tabloid
- Owner(s): Dorian Nuñez
- Language: English
- Headquarters: Sunset Drive,San Pedro Town, Ambergris Caye, Belize
- Website: ambergristoday.com

Ambergris Today is an English-language weekly newspaper published in San Pedro Town, Ambergris Caye, Belize. It is a free newspaper, marketed to tourists.

== See also ==
- List of newspapers in Belize.
