= Ministry of Education and Youth =

Government ministry of Belize

The Ministry of Education and Youth (MoE) is a government ministry of Belize. The ministry's offices are located in the west block, in Belmopan, Cayo District.
