= Law Enforcement Torch Run =

Campaign to benefit the Special Olympics

- Founded: 1981; 45 years ago
- Founder: Chief Richard LaMunyon
- Location: 1133 19th Street, N.W., Washington, D.C., U.S. 20036
- Origins: Wichita, Kansas
- Region served: International
- Key people: Richard LaMunyon (chairman emeritus); Scott Whyte (chairman); Mark Musso (vice chairman)
- Website: www.letr.org

The Law Enforcement Torch Run (LETR) is a campaign to benefit the Special Olympics. It began in 1981 in Wichita, Kansas, and is the largest grass-roots fundraising movement for the Special Olympics.

LETR is run by police officers, sheriff's deputies, correction officers, support staff, police volunteers and other law enforcement professionals from around the world. Close to 97,000 police professionals in over 45 countries participate in this worldwide effort to raise money and awareness for Special Olympics. Participants in the LETR help spread the word about the benefits of Special Olympics and how the program helps define the brave participants of these programs as athletes, and not define them by their disabilities. Since its inception in 1981, LETR has raised $619,187,626.

Similar in many ways to the Olympic Torch Relay, the Law Enforcement Torch Run consists of scheduled relay events, usually held in conjunction and coordination with Special Olympics functions (like the Special Olympics Summer and Winter Games). While carrying the flame, officers and athletes are referred to as "Guardians of the Flame". In the broader sense, the LETR is used to define all of the special events, and fundraising activities that law enforcement conducts to contribute to this campaign. This includes (but is not limited to), tip-a-cop events, car washes, Polar Plunges, roof sits, motorcycle runs, online fundraising, T-shirt and hat sales, media events, and more.

Every two years, the Special Olympics World Games are held. This brings about a special torch run called the Final Leg Run, during which, law enforcement, together with Special Olympic athletes, run the Flame of Hope throughout the host country for the games, spreading awareness for Special Olympics. This culminates with the lighting of the cauldron for the Flame of Hope at the opening ceremonies for the Special Olympics World Games.

Every year, members of the LETR converge at the International LETR conference to exchange ideas, and network about Special Olympics awareness and fundraising techniques.

== Gallery ==
LETR Torch runners display the Flame of Hope at Niagara Falls, Canada Nov. '06.

Washington Special Olympic Athletes and Redmond Police Officer at a fundraising & awareness event

A tip-a-cop event to benefit Special Olympics.

Officers go up on a rooftop of a local grocery store to raise money and awareness for Special Olympics.

Police Officers serve meals during a fundraising event.

== See also ==
- Special Olympics World Games
- Flame of Hope
- Olympic Games
- Special Olympics LETR Parent Website
- 2007 World Games Official Website
- Special Olympics Washington
- Special Olympics Missouri Torch Run Information Page
- Special Olympics Montana Torch Run
