= The Placencia Breeze =

Newspaper of the Belize Tourism Industry Association

Front page of the August 2016 edition

The Placencia Breeze is a monthly newspaper written by the Placencia division of the Belize Tourism Industry Association (BTIA). The Breeze places less emphasis on traditional news and focuses on community efforts and tourism related developments. It is the home town paper of the popular Belizean tourist destination, Placencia.

The Breeze began publishing in April 2001 and has published nearly every month since. It has a print circulation of 1,500.
