= List of television stations in Belize =

This is a list of Belizean television stations.

== Television stations ==
- Channel 5: Great Belize Television
- Channel 7: Tropical Vision Limited
- Channel 15: Krem TV
- Love Belize
- TeleNova
- Maximum TV
- Plus TV
- Wave TV
- BBN TV : BELIZE BROADCASTING NETWORK
- CTV3 : Centaur Television
- TNC10: The National Channel
- Positive Vibes
- CBTV : Color Blind Multimedia Productions
- Hitz
- BHA TV : Belize Hotel Association Television
- PGTV
- REEF TV
- Guadalupe Media
- Belize Adventist Television Network
- R-JET
- SWITCH TV
- Seinsu Radio & TV

== See also ==
- List of newspapers in Belize
