= Althea Sealy =

Belizean ballerina (born 1960)

Althea Sealy (born December 26, 1960) is a Belizean ballerina who serves as the first Artistic Director of the Belize National Dance Company.

== Early childhood and education ==
Sealy was born in Belize City in 1960, and she danced in public for the first time when she was six years old. Sealy studied dance at St. Mary's Hall, later attending high school at Wesley College.

== Dance career ==
=== Belize Creative Dancers ===
In the 1980s, Althea Sealy founded the dance company Belize Creative Dancers alongside several other women. The group followed modern dance, Afro Caribbean dance, Latin dance, and other styles.

=== Belize National Dance Company ===
Sealy has served as Artistic Director of the Belize National Dance Company since 1990, and she has been a principal dancer.
