= Garifuna music =

Ethnic music from Central America

- Stylistic origins: African; Arawak; Kalinago
- Cultural origins: Garifuna people
- Typical instruments: Drums; maracas

Subgenres
- Adügürühani; Arairaguni; Amuyadahani; Achuguhani

Language, dance, and music of the Garifuna
- UNESCO Intangible Cultural Heritage
- Country: Belize; Guatemala; Honduras; Nicaragua
- Reference: 00001
- Region: Latin America and the Caribbean

Inscription history
- Inscription: 2008 (3rd session)
- List: Representative

Garifuna music is an ethnic music and dance with African, Arawak, and Kalinago elements, originating with the Afro-Indigenous Garifuna people from Central America and Saint Vincent and the Grenadines. In 2001, Garifuna music, dance, and language were collectively proclaimed as a Masterpiece of the Oral and Intangible Heritage of Humanity by UNESCO.

== Nonsecular music ==
=== Genres ===
Nonsecular musical genres within the Garifuna culture stem from a fusion of West African ancestral worship and Amerindian shamanism. Examples of Garifuna music rituals include Adügürühani (also known as dügü), a healing ceremony; Arairaguni, an invocation to determine illness; Amuyadahani, a ritual in which family members make offerings to their ancestors; and Achuguhani (Chugú), "feeding the dead".

=== Dügü (Feeding the Dead) ===
The Garifuna tradition of Adügürühani is a ritual that takes place when a Garifuna individual becomes ill and must consult a shaman in the hopes of restoring their health. The shaman will consult with the ancestral spirits (gubida) that have inflicted the illness upon the individual. Drums are played during the dügü, which is thought to have a calming effect on the individual who is possessed by the gubida. The drumming is performed in triple meter and is accompanied by song and dance. Often there are two to three drums, and the ensemble of drummers is called dangbu. The drums are constructed using mahogany or mayflower wood and animal skins (usually deer, goat, or peccary). During construction, the drums are rubbed with a cassava wine and then subsequently blessed with the smoke of buwe—a sacred herb. These techniques suggest the presence of both African and Amerindian influences in drum construction, indicative of a fusion of African and Amerindian culture in Garifuna sacred music.

The gender roles documented in the musical performances of dügü suggest that traditional Garifuna society emphasizes matrilineality and matrifocality. "The texts of most dügü songs refer to ancestors as female (grandmother or great-grandmother, even if the dügü is being given in honor of a man)… It may also be a reflection of gender-based empowerment, because older women predominate as organizers, ritual participants, and composers of ritual songs." Gender roles are often portrayed in music. "Music performance can and often does play an important role in inter-gender relations, for the inequalities or asymmetries perceived in such relations may be protested, mediated, reversed, and transformed, or confined through various social/musical strategies." The matrilineatlity demonstrated in the Garifuna dügü ritual demonstrates an authentic (non-westernized) aspect of West African and/or Amerindian culture, which remained unaffected by Spanish (and subsequently, British) colonization.

== Secular music ==
=== Genres ===
Garifuna genres include punta, paranda, and punta rock.

There are different types of songs, some of which are associated with work, some with play, some with dance, and some that are reserved for prayer or ritual use.

=== Instruments ===
The main traditional instruments are drums and maracas.

Drums play an important role in Garifuna music. The main drum is the Segunda (bass drum). The drums are normally made by hollowing out logs and stretching antelope skin over them.

== Notable performers ==
- Sofía Blanco
- Pen Cayetano
- Paul Nabor
- Aurelio Martínez
- Andy Palacio
- Umalali

== See also ==
- Garifuna language
