= Aurelio Martínez =

Honduran musician (1969–2025)

Aurelio
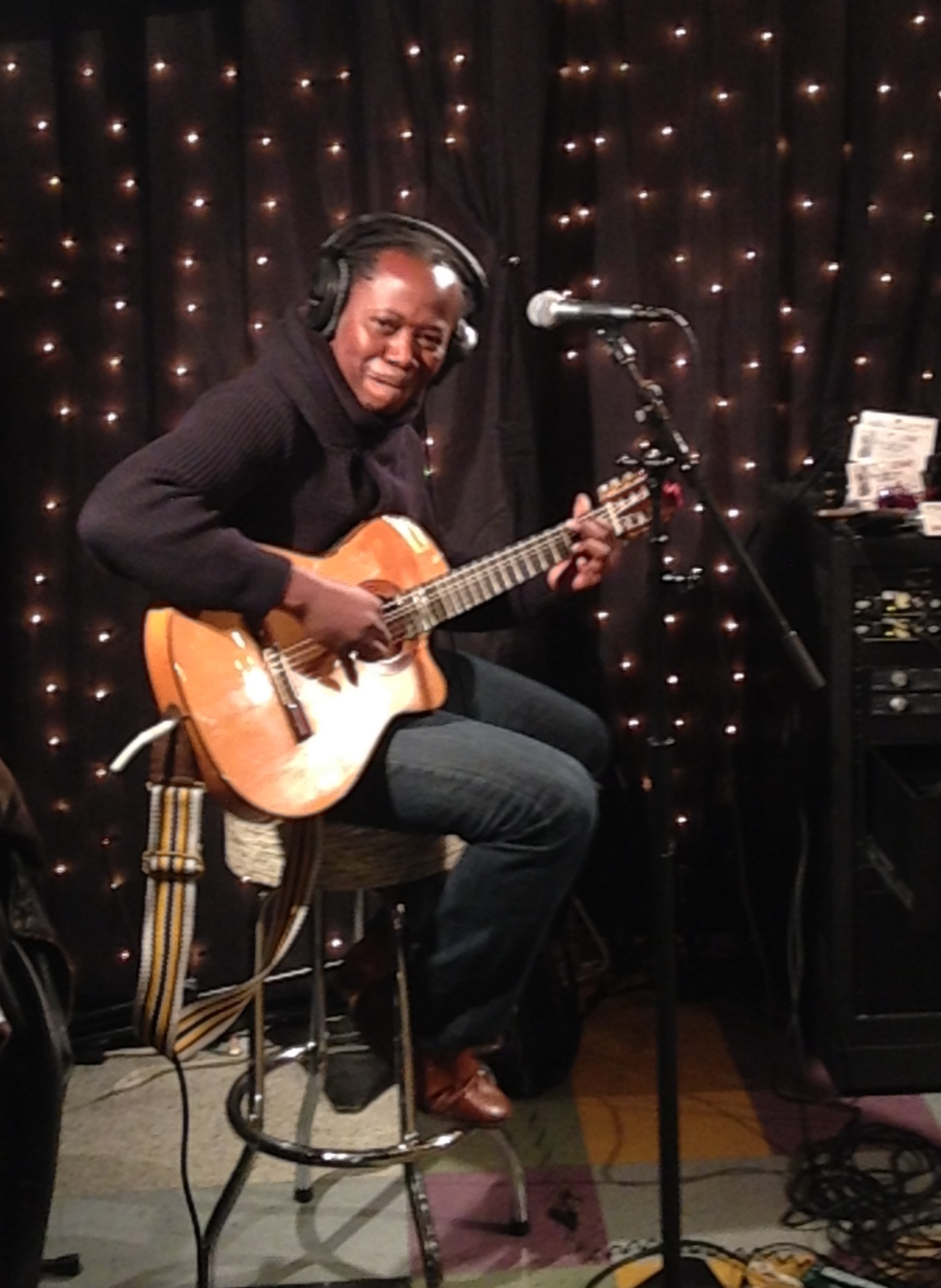
- Martínez in 2014

Background information
- Born: Aurelio Martínez Suazo; 26 September 1969; Gracias a Dios Department, Honduras
- Died: 17 March 2025 (aged 55) Roatán, Honduras
- Genres: Punta; Latin; Garifuna; Afro-Caribbean; roots; paranda
- Occupations: Musician; singer-songwriter
- Instruments: Vocals; guitar
- Years active: 2004–2025
- Label: Real World Records
- Website: aureliomusic.net

Aurelio Martínez Suazo (26 September 1969 – 17 March 2025), professionally known as Aurelio, was a Honduran singer-songwriter and politician. Known for his Garifuna music, he was considered a cultural ambassador of the Garifuna people. According to The Guardian, he became the leading Garifuna performer after the death of musician Andy Palacio. His album "Laru Beya" was considered among the best albums of Latin American music, according to Los 600 de Latinoamérica, a 2024 ranking made by Latin American music critics.

== Life and career ==
From 2006 to 2010, Martínez served as the first Afro-Honduran member of the National Congress of Honduras.

In 2021, a number of his songs were featured in the documentary about an excavation by the German Archaeological Institute at the coastline of Honduras accompanying an exhibition of the Rietberg Museum.

Martínez and 11 other people died on Roatán Island on 17 March 2025, after Aerolínea Lanhsa Flight 018, the plane he was travelling on, experienced engine failure after taking off from Juan Manuel Gálvez International Airport and fell into the sea. He was 55.

== Discography ==
=== Solo records ===
- 2017: Darandi (Real World Records / Stonetree Records) Darandi DARANDI, by AURELIO
- 2014: Lándini (Real World Records / Stonetree Records)
- 2011: Laru Beya (Real World Records / Stonetree Records)
- 2004: Garifuna Soul (Stonetree Records)
- 1995: Songs of the Garifuna: Lita Ariran (JVC World Sounds)

=== Collaborations ===
- 2007: Wátina – Andy Palacio & The Garifuna Collective (Stonetree Records / Cumbancha)
- 1999: Paranda – Various Artists (Stonetree Records )
