= Ivan Duran (musician) =

Belizean musician producer and musician

Ivan Duran is a Belizean music producer and musician, and the founder and director of Stonetree Records, an independent record label and music recording studio based in Benque Viejo del Carmen in Belize. He has produced over 30 albums featuring the musical styles of Belize and the region.

Since founding Stonetree in 1995, Duran has been a promoter of Belizean music overseas, attending World Music trade fairs and presenting local artists in music festivals around the world. In 2007 he received the WOMEX award alongside Andy Palacio for their work on the Watina album, voted by Amazon.com as the #1 World Music album of all time.

In 2003, he co-founded MIAB (The Music Industry Association of Belize) As president of MIAB he is involved in promoting and creating awareness of all kinds of local music and produces the annual Belize Music Week.

In 2014, Duran collaborated with COPILOT Music and Sound on a cover of Carlinhos Brown's "Maria Caipirnha (Samba da Bahia)”. The arrangement represented the musical instrumentation and styles of Honduras for Visa's "Samba of the World", a digital campaign for the 2014 FIFA World Cup.
