= Pen Cayetano =

Belizean artist and musician (born 1954)

Pen Cayetano MBE
- Born: Delvin Cayetano; 1954 (age 71–72); Dangriga, Stann Creek, British Honduras (now Belize)
- Spouses: Ingrid Cayetano
- Website: cayetanos.com

Delvin "Pen" Cayetano MBE (born 1954) is a Belizean artist and musician.

== Early life and career ==
Cayetano was born in 1954 in Dangriga Town, Stann Creek District, Belize.

Cayetano is self-taught in the art of painting and music and claims his influences come from the native Garifuna culture and that of the Creoles. These are the two largest ethnically black groups in Belize.

Cayetano began painting in the late 1970s at a studio in Dangriga. He remained in Dangriga until 1990, when he moved to Germany. He has showcased all over the world and become one of Belize's foremost cultural ambassadors. He and his German wife, Ingrid, returned to Dangriga in July 2009 and they opened the Pen Cayetano Studio Gallery 1 in August 2009.

Cayetano is currently married with three children (Malí, Beni, and Ibo). His family band, "The Cayetanos", carry on their father's musical traditions.

Cayetano was appointed a Member of the Order of the British Empire in the 2013 New Year Honours.

A large number of artworks of Cayetano are on display at the Museum of Belize to celebrate its twenty-first anniversary since February 2023.

== Contributions to punta rock ==
Pen Cayetano, with his Turtle Shell Band, invented punta rock by introducing the turtle shell and electric instruments to Punta, creating a new music genre that has become popular with Garifuna artists.

According to Cayetano, the origins of punta rock developed in Dangriga, Belize in 1978 at the Artist Studio at 5 Moho Road during a ceremony to honor Garifuna pioneer Thomas Vincent Ramos (Ramos had convinced the government of Belize to celebrate Garifuna Settlement Day in honor of the arrival of the group to Belize in 1802 and 1832). During the ceremony, Cayetano witnessed different generations clashing as a group of youth sang songs in Garifuna while a group of Garinagu drummers and singers performed, leading to the studio banning the youth. This clash inspired Cayetano to introduce musical change to Garinagu culture and began learning to write and play his own songs, to which he learned how to use turtle shells as another form of percussion. Cayetano built on that foundation to create the "Turtle Shell Band" in 1979.

== The Turtle Shell Band ==
After the formation of the Turtle Shell Band, early band members included solo star Mohobub Flores and Peter "Poots" Flores (no relation). The band built its reputation in and around Dangriga until 1982, when it held its first performances in Belmopan and Belize City. Eventually the band appeared on Radio Belize and eventually made their way into international recognition from Mexico to the United States of America.

Cayetano continues to record and was awarded by the National Institute of Culture and History for his achievements in 2003.
