= The San Pedro Sun =

Newspaper in Belize

- Front page of the February 3, 2017 edition
- Type: Weekly newspaper
- Format: Tabloid
- Owner(s): Ron and Tamara Sniffin
- Founded: 1991
- Website: sanpedrosun.com

The San Pedro Sun is a newspaper published continuously since 1991 and serves the community of San Pedro Town located on Ambergris Caye in Belize, Central America. The newspaper is owned and managed by Ron and Tamara Sniffin. Graphic design and layout is done by Mary Gonzalez. Dennis Craft is on staff as a journalist. The Sun also publishes a "Visitor's Guide" each week that features tourism interests in San Pedro and Belize. The Visitor Guide is inserted inside each issue of The San Pedro Sun.
