= Andy Palacio =

Belizean musician

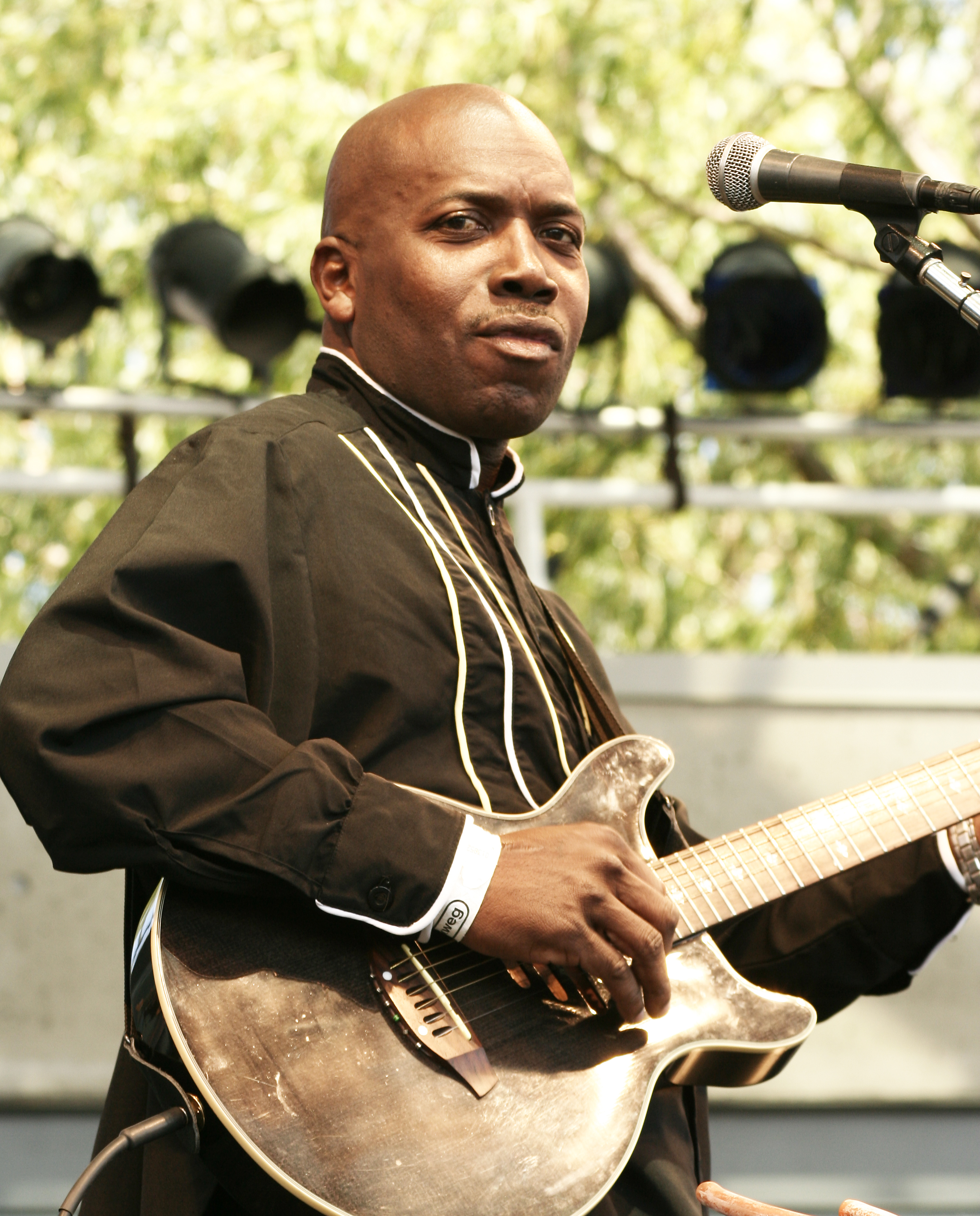

Background information
- Born: December 2, 1960; Barranco, Toledo District, British Honduras (now Belize)
- Died: January 19, 2008 (aged 47) Belize City, Belize
- Genre: Punta music
- Occupation: Musician
- Instrument: Guitar
- Years active: 1981–2008
- Label: Cumbancha Stonetree

Andy Vivian Palacio (December 2, 1960 – January 19, 2008) was a Belizean punta musician and government official. He was also a leading activist for the Garifuna people and their culture.

== Biography ==
Palacio was born and raised in the coastal village of Barranco. He worked briefly as a high school social studies teacher before turning to music. Palacio received the award for "Best New Artist" at the Caribbean Music Awards in 1991, WOMEX Award in 2007 and was posthumously awarded the BBC3 Awards for World Music award in the Americas Category, in 2008.

=== Contributions to Belizean music and media ===
In addition to the traditional Garifuna music that he played, Palacio absorbed the diverse sounds disseminated by radio from neighboring Mexico, Guatemala, Honduras, Cuba, Jamaica and the United States. Palacio pursued his musical ambitions in a series of high school bands, covering a diversity of popular music from abroad. Attracted by the ideals of the Nicaraguan revolution, he joined the literacy campaign in that nation's African-Amerindian Caribbean coast region and developed a deeper appreciation for his own threatened cultural and linguistic traditions. Those insights made their way into his own creativity, influencing him to delve more deeply into the roots of Garifuna music.

Palacio returned from Nicaragua to discover the emergence of new Garifuna pride in their culture and identity, a development dramatically expressed in the sudden popularity of punta rock, a fusion of traditional Garifuna music with electric guitar and the influences of R&B, jazz, and rock and roll. The Original Turtle Shell Band, led by Belizean Garifuna musician and painter Delvin "Pen" Cayetano, burst into national consciousness in the early 1980s just as Belize gained independence. The Turtle Shell Band's invitation to perform with their mentor Isabel Flores (a legendary Garifuna percussionist and singer, now deceased) at the 1983 New Orleans Jazz and Heritage Festival encouraged Andy Palacio to pursue a musical career.

In 1987, after Pen Cayetano turned down an invitation to work in England with Cultural Partnerships Limited, a community arts organization, Palacio stepped in. He returned to Belize six months later with professional experience, a broadened perspective, and connections that led to his involvement with the short-lived Sunrise recording project, the first effort to record, document, preserve and distribute Belizean roots music. The following year Palacio's career took off, buoyed by widely circulated cassette recordings released by Sunrise, and a string of invitations to represent Belize musically at the Festival Internacional de Cultura del Caribe (Cancun), Carifesta VI (Trinidad and Tobago), Carifesta VII (St. Kitts-Nevis), the Rainforest World Music Festival (Malaysia), the Antillanse Feesten (Belgium), the World Traditional Performing Arts Festival (Japan) and countless performances in the United States, Canada, Colombia, France, Germany and Great Britain.

Two critically acclaimed recordings on the Stonetree label, Belize's only record company, cemented Palacio's fame at home while reinforcing his stature as the country's foremost overseas cultural ambassador. Recorded in Havana and Belize, Keimoun (1995) showcased Palacio's vocal and composition talents, enlisting first-rate Cuban and Belizean studio artists. The first CD to be produced in Belize, Keimoun put the country on the world music map, and is listed by The Rough Guide as one of 100 essential recordings from Latin America and the Caribbean. Two years later Palacio returned with Til Da Mawnin, an energetic mix of dance tunes backed by Belize's top instrumentalists and singers.

Appointed Belizean Cultural Ambassador and Deputy Administrator of the National Institute of Culture and History in 2004, Palacio devoted himself to the preservation of Garifuna music and culture. In 2007, Palacio's years of work with the Stonetree's Garifuna All-Stars project came to fruition with the release of the acclaimed Wátina album. Wátina featured a multigenerational crew of Garifuna musicians from Belize, Guatemala, and Honduras (including octogenarian singer Paul Nabor) that delved deeply into traditional Garifuna rhythms and songs. The album was a critical success that garnered worldwide attention for the Garifuna people, culture and language. Thanks to Wátina, Palacio was named a UNESCO Artist for Peace and won the prestigious WOMEX Award in 2007.

Palacio later served as a head of the National Institute of Culture and History and was named a cultural ambassador. He released over five original albums beginning with Nabi in 1990. He also traveled widely promoting and performing his music.

Palacio briefly hosted a television program on Channel 5 named after him and featuring works from Belizeans. He also wrote the theme music for Channel 5's newscast.

On March 14, 2007, Palacio released his last studio album, Wátina, which he considered his masterpiece. The album features guest appearances from other prominent Garifuna artists including Paul Nabor and Aurelio Martinez and was produced by Ivan Duran at Stonetree Records.

=== Illness and death ===
On January 16, 2008, Palacio suddenly fell ill with two apparent "stroke-like seizures" at his home in San Ignacio and hospitalized in Belmopan and later Belize City. In Belize City Palacio was referred to go to Chicago for more specialized medical treatment via air ambulance, but his condition steadily deteriorated en route. While stopped to clear United States customs in Mobile, Alabama, Palacio was found unconscious and rushed to a local hospital, where his prognosis was deemed bleak. His family requested he return so he could die in his home country. According to a press release from his record label, Cumbancha, Palacio died in Belize City at 21:00 local time on January 19 of "a massive and extensive stroke to the brain, a heart attack, And respiratory failure."

== Discography ==
Albums

- Greatest Hits (1979)
- Keimoun (beat on) (1995)
- Til Da Mawnin (1997)
- Wátina (2007)

Contributing artist

- The Rough Guide to the Music of Central America (2002, World Music Network)
