= Paranda (music) =

Music genre

- Stylistic origins: Punta, Garifuna music
- Typical instruments: Garifuna drums; acoustic guitar; maracas; shekere; claves

Regional scenes
- Belize; Guatemala; Honduras

Other topics
- Punta

Paranda is both a Garifuna rhythm and music with Arawak and African elements which utilizes rhythmic ostinatos in duple meter. Although similar to punta, paranda is distinguished by its faster rhythm and its incorporation of guitars. Paranda mainly focuses on the struggles that occurs in the Garifuna community and emphasizes melodies that contain soulful lamentations. Stylistically, it reflects Spanish influences.

The music style originates from the 19th-century arrival of the Garifuna people to Central America, where they blended their traditional music. The style has spread to places where the Garifuna migrated, but the highest concentration of population and use of the music/dance style persists in Belize, Guatemala and Honduras. The Latin-American influence of paranda is seen in its use of serenade and solemn social commentary accompanied by acoustic guitar. Usually performed by men, the music has a moderate tempo and is characterized by distinctive drum rhythms. The pattern begins with a quarter note and eighth note tapped in the drum center followed by an eighth note tapped on the drum rim. It is related to the parrandas of Venezuela and Puerto Rico, as well as the parang from Trinidad and Tobago, but unlike its counterparts is not derived from religious themes. Garifuna parandas speak of issues relating to men. Also unlike the Venezuelan genre, Garifuna parandas are not traditionally accompanied by string instruments and bands, but instead use a single guitar and voice with rhythm support. Supporting rhythm is typically provided by two drums, which is usual for secular music. The bass drum, called the segunda, provides the beat and the smaller drum, called the primero, is used for flourishes to lead the dancers.
