= Punta =

Traditional music and dance performed by Garifuna people

- Stylistic origins: Garifuna
- Typical instruments: Garifuna drums; shekere; maracas; conch

Regional scenes
- Belize; Guatemala; Honduras; United States

Other topics
- Paranda Punta rock

Example of punta music

Punta is an Afro-indigenous dance and cultural music of the Belizean, Guatemalan, Honduran and Nicaraguan Garífuna people, originating from the Caribbean island of Saint Vincent and the Grenadines (also known as Yurumei). It has African and Arawak elements which are also the characteristics of the Garífuna language. It is also known as banguity or bunda.

The diaspora of Garífuna people, commonly called the "Garifuna Nation", traces its ancestry back to those West Africans who escaped slavery and the Indigenous Arawak and Kalinago peoples. Punta is used to reaffirm and express the struggle felt by the indigenous population's common heritage through cultural artforms such as dance and music; to highlight their strong sense of endurance, and to reconnect to their ancestors. Besides Honduras, punta also has a following in Belize, Guatemala, Saint Vincent and the Grenadines, and the United States.

Lyrics may be in Garifuna, Kriol, English or Spanish. Most songs are performed in the indigenous Arawakan languages of the Garinagu and are often simply contemporary adaptations of traditional Garífuna songs. Being the most popular dance in Garífuna culture, Punta is danced specifically at Garífuna funerals, on beaches, and in parks. Punta is iconic of Garífuna ethnicity and modernity and can be seen as poetic folk art that connects older cultures and rhythms with new sounds. Chumba and hunguhungu, circular dances in triple rhythm, are often combined with punta.

== Origins and historical context ==
In their culture, the people refer to themselves as both Garinagu and Garifuna, with Garifuna mainly pertaining to their culture, music, and dance rather than using it to identify their people. There are a variety of possible origins of the punta's intended meaning for the Garifuna dance and music it represents. The word punta is a Latinization of an ancient West African rhythm called bunda, or "buttocks" in the Mandé language. Another possibility refers to punta in the Spanish meaning "from point to point", referring to the tips of one's toes or to the movement from place to place.

The punta dance is performed by a man and a woman who evolve separately in a circle formed by the spectators. They begin facing each other and the figure varies with the ingenuity of the dancers, but always represents the evolution of a courtship in which first the man pursues, and then the woman, while the other retreats; and ends only when one of them, from exhaustion or from lack of further initiative, admits defeat by retiring from the ring, to have his or her place immediately taken by another. Punta dance is a mimetic cock-and-hen mating dance with rapid movements of the buttocks, hips, and feet, while the upper torso remains motionless. Couples attempt to dance more stylistically and seductively, with better hip movements, than their competitors. As the evening progresses, the punta becomes extremely "hot"; while the spectators egged on their favorites with cries of: mígira-ba labu, "don't leave (off) under him!" or: mígira-ba tabu, "don't leave (off) under her!" which has the same effect as, "don't let him (or her) beat you!"

Over time due to their difficult history, music and dance became a way to explain their daily lives and surroundings, a vehicle to communicate Garifuna struggles and ideas, and an antidote to celebrate life and release Garifuna pain. "While punta the song form symbolizes the retention of culture through music, punta the dance form symbolizes the continuity of life." The basic dance appeals across lines of gender and age, whether it is expressed in its original, more conservative manner with gentle swaying hips that imply sexual desire, or the more aggressive, provocative manner that emulates sex. The constantly pulsating rhythms represent the most direct and physical form of intimacy, which attracts people of various ethnicities as well.

Punta rituals have been observed on holidays such as Christmas Eve and New Year's Day by anthropologist Cynthia Chamberlain Bianchi during her study in the late 1970s-mid 1980s. More commonly were the religious or ancestral rituals, as those seen on the ninth-night wakes by anthropologist Nancie Gonzales during her fieldwork in Central America. If a death occurred at night, then the wake would begin early the next morning and continue all day, ending with a burial in the late afternoon. However, if the death were during the day, an all-night wake would ensue with people coming and going throughout, with prayers and drinking being a familiar sight. Punta dancing can be considered a salient feature of the all-night watches and was mandatory for many participants. Gonzales reflected on her work and other anthropologists', such as Virginia Kearns, concluding that similar evidence has been found in Belize, as well as her own in Honduras, that most punta dancing and storytelling was kept until the ninth-night wake, rather than included at any time.

Punta music is well known for its call and response patterns and rhythmic drumming that reflects an African and Amerindian origin. The Garinagu people say that their music is not about feeling or emotion, as in most other Latin American nations, but more so about events and dealing with the world around them. A Garifuna elder, Rutilia Figueroa, stated: "The Garifuna sing their pain. They sing about their concerns. They sing about what's going on. We dance when there is a death. It's a tradition [meant] to bring a little joy to the family, but every song has a different meaning. Different words. The Garifuna does not sing about love. The Garifuna sings about things that reach your heart."

== Role of women ==
During her field study in southern Belize from 1974 to 1976, Virginia Kerns witnessed the women's roles and participation in punta first hand. She recalls: "During the course of the singing, one woman distributes rum to the others present. Later, feeling the full effects of several drinks, the women begin to dance punta and the atmosphere grows increasingly festive. Outside, the inevitable crowd of spectators gathers, mainly young adults and children, who hover on the periphery at such ritual events." She also notes that the length of the dancing can go on as long as the next afternoon, depending on the supply of rum and the enthusiasm of the dancers.

In a more recent study done in 2009, Amy Serrano took a closer look at Garinagu roots and influence within New Orleans. She notes that during some performances the men partake and the women watch, while others involve both men and women interacting and dancing or solely women performing. These influences can be seen in the call and response aspect of punta, as well as the dancing and playing of the instruments.

While men in the Garifuna community tend to learn their customs through informal apprenticeships in New Orleans, women consciously conserve and pass on the cultural dances and songs to the younger generations through storytelling. This continuing practice resembles the past, like when the Garifuna first arrived in Honduras and the women cultivated the homes where West African and indigenous spirituality merged with the Catholic religion into their emerging Garifuna folk expression, and above all, within family, ritual, and celebration. To clarify this statement from Serrano's research, "Juan M. Sambula, a former community activist from Honduras who recently came to New Orleans for reconstruction work shares the following:

'For us, the women are dedicated to the children and the church because the customs we have are based on the Gari tribe of Africa, mixed with Arawak. So I think that the mother's role in this case is different because she is dedicated to the children and the church while the man is dedicated to his friends.' "

== Instruments ==
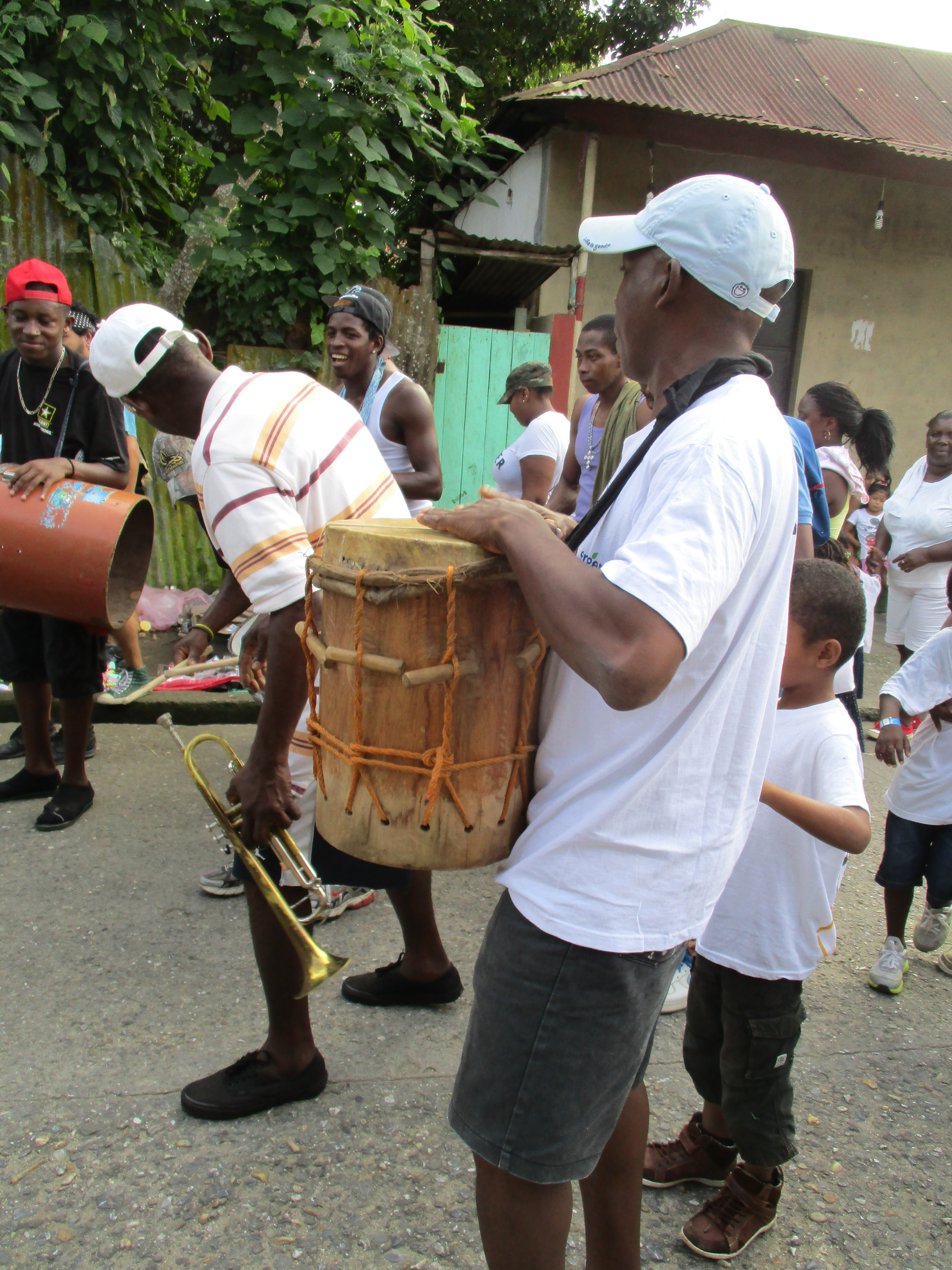
Musicians in the pororó festival in the streets at Livingston, Izabal, Guatemala. December 2015

The music of punta involves responsorial singing accompanied by indigenous membranophones, idiophones, and aerophones. Membranophones are instruments that create sound through a vibrating skin or vellum stretched over an opening, as in all drums. Idiophones are instruments that produce sound through the vibrating of a solid material that is free of tension, commonly found in shakers, scrapers, and xylophones. Aerophones are instruments that create sound through vibrating air within a column or tube, like pipes and horns. Other instruments used in the Garifuna culture include calabash rattles called shakkas (chaka) and conch-shell trumpets.

The two principle Garifuna instruments are single-headed drums known as the primera and segunda. The primera, or the lead tenor drum, is the smaller of the two. This drum is used as the drummer contrives a series of rhythms key to punta. The segunda is the bass drum. The drummer playing this instrument repeats a single duple-meter ostinato throughout the song. While the second drum plays steady, the first drum and the other instruments like the maracas and conch shell improvise solos similar to those in a jazz song. The punta ritual for a wake is sung in Garifuna, with a soloist and a chorus. Although punta music may sound happy, the words can often be sad. One song can be translated as, "Yesterday you were well. Last night you caught a fever. Now in the morning you are dead."

== Evolution and changes in punta ==
From its original context, punta has been transformed by time and modernity. Before, punta consisted of a dance between a man and woman, where they competed against each other by shaking their hips and moving their feet to the beat of a drum. This theme of sensuality and intimacy was considered inappropriate for children, who were excluded from the ritual. Now, it is much more common to see children participate in and view a punta dance. Another change that has been developing in the past century has come in the increasing role of women as singers and drummers, which were thought to be solely male roles and women were only allowed to play if there were no men available. Women have expanded their influence in punta, as well as punta rock, although punta rock does still involve more male-oriented arrangements and performances. Punta also was formerly performed in ancestral celebrations and religious rituals of the recently deceased, but can now be seen in all forms of celebrations, such as birthday parties, communions, or holiday gatherings as a sense of cultural expression.

Traditional punta music was also played with two wooden drums, a conch shell, and a type of maracas. Today, acoustical and electric instruments have been added to create "punta rock", which has become a main export of the Garinagu and grown in popularity across Central America and into the United States. The double-meter rhythm of punta is the primary basis for punta rock. Punta rock is a musical craze that began in the early 1980s and persists today among young adults in the Garifuna communities of Belize, El Salvador, Guatemala and Honduras. Andy Palacio, a homegrown Belizean artist, believes that punta rock is "a mix of Garifuna rhythms with a little bit of reggae, a little bit of R&B, and a little bit of rock and roll". Although punta rock has achieved national attention for the modern Garifuna youth, it has not replaced the original punta music. Punta is believed to coexist with punta rock, and maintains its significance as the primary musical genre of social commentary.

== Popular punta and punta rock bands ==
"Punta served as a paradigm for a new language of musical expression (punta rock) as well as a continuum for the revolution of popular contemporary Garifuna music in general". Modernity and punta exist simultaneously as interdependent and interrelated scales of technological and musical transformation, with modernity as the epicenter for the evolution of punta, serving as the medium through which the effects of modernity can be seen. This transformation has also allowed punta rock and punta to appeal to different age groups and be used in a variety of social contexts.

Musician and visual artist Pen Cayetano and the Turtle Shell Band introduced punta rock in 1978, at 5 Moho Street, Dangriga, Belize. His songs in the Garifuna language added electric guitar to the traditional punta rhythm. Cayetano's style caught on quickly in Belize and from there spread to Garifuna communities in Honduras and Guatemala.

Young progressive Garifuna men and women who looked to American style and did not carry on traditions experienced a resurgence of their culture. More artists began composing Garifuna songs to traditional Garifuna rhythms. Their lyrics gave the political, social and economic issues of Belizean Garifuna people a global platform and inspired a new generation to apply their talents to their own ancestral forms and unique concerns.

Punta musicians in Central America, the US, and elsewhere made further advances with the introduction of the piano, woodwind, brass and string instruments. Punta rock has grown since the early 1980s to include other electronic instruments such as the synthesizer and electric bass guitar as well as other percussive instruments.

Punta, along with Reggaeton music are predominantly popular and influential among the entire population in Honduras. Often mixed with Spanish, punta has a widespread audience due to the immigration of Hondurans and Guatemalans to the United States, other parts of Latin America and Europe, notably Spain. Honduran punta has caused Belizean and Guatemalan punta to use more Spanish due to the commercial success achieved by bands that use it.

When Banda Blanca of Honduras sold over 3 million copies of "Sopa De Caracol" ("Conch Soup"), originally written by Belizean Chico Ramos, the Garifunas of Belize felt cheated but celebrated the success. The genre is continuing to develop a strong following in the United States and South America and the Caribbean.

Belizean punta is distinctive from traditional punta in that songs are usually in Kriol or Garifuna and rarely in Spanish or English. calypso and soca have had some effect on it. Like calypso and soca, Belizean punta provides social commentary and risqué humor, though the initial wave of punta acts eschewed the former. Calypso Rose, Lord Rhaburn and the Cross Culture Band assisted the acceptance of punta by Belizean Kriol people by singing calypso songs about punta – songs such as "Gumagrugu Watah" and "Punta Rock Eena Babylon".

Prominent broadcasters of punta music include WAVE Radio and Krem Radio.

== Punta and Garifuna culture beyond Central America ==
Garifuna culture has grown and transcended national borders through punta's integrative expression of ethnic identity through music, dance, and language in Central America and the United States. Currently, the largest population of the estimated 200,000 transnational Garfiuna people can be found in Honduras (90,000), with smaller populations in Belize (15,000), Guatemala (6,000), and another several thousand scattered in South America and almost 50,000 living in North America. Three areas of larger Garifuna presences include New York City, Miami, New Orleans and mainly Houston. Though sometimes they go unnoticed in the larger aspect of their communities in America, the Garinagu continue to preserve their language, customs, cuisine, and renowned storytelling through their diverse and unique music and dance styles.

In 2001, UNESCO proclaimed the Garifuna language and culture to be "a masterpiece of oral and intangible heritage of humanity", in recognition of the risk of an endangered status and loss of such an interesting culture. The Garifuna communities use punta dance and music to continue their culture and to teach younger generations of their ancestry. This tradition instills a sense of pride and gives the younger generation a tangible identity to cling to in an environment where globalization can overpower smaller cultures.
