= Saint Vincent (Saint Vincent and the Grenadines) =

Island of Saint Vincent and the Grenadines

Native name: Youloumain (Kalinago)
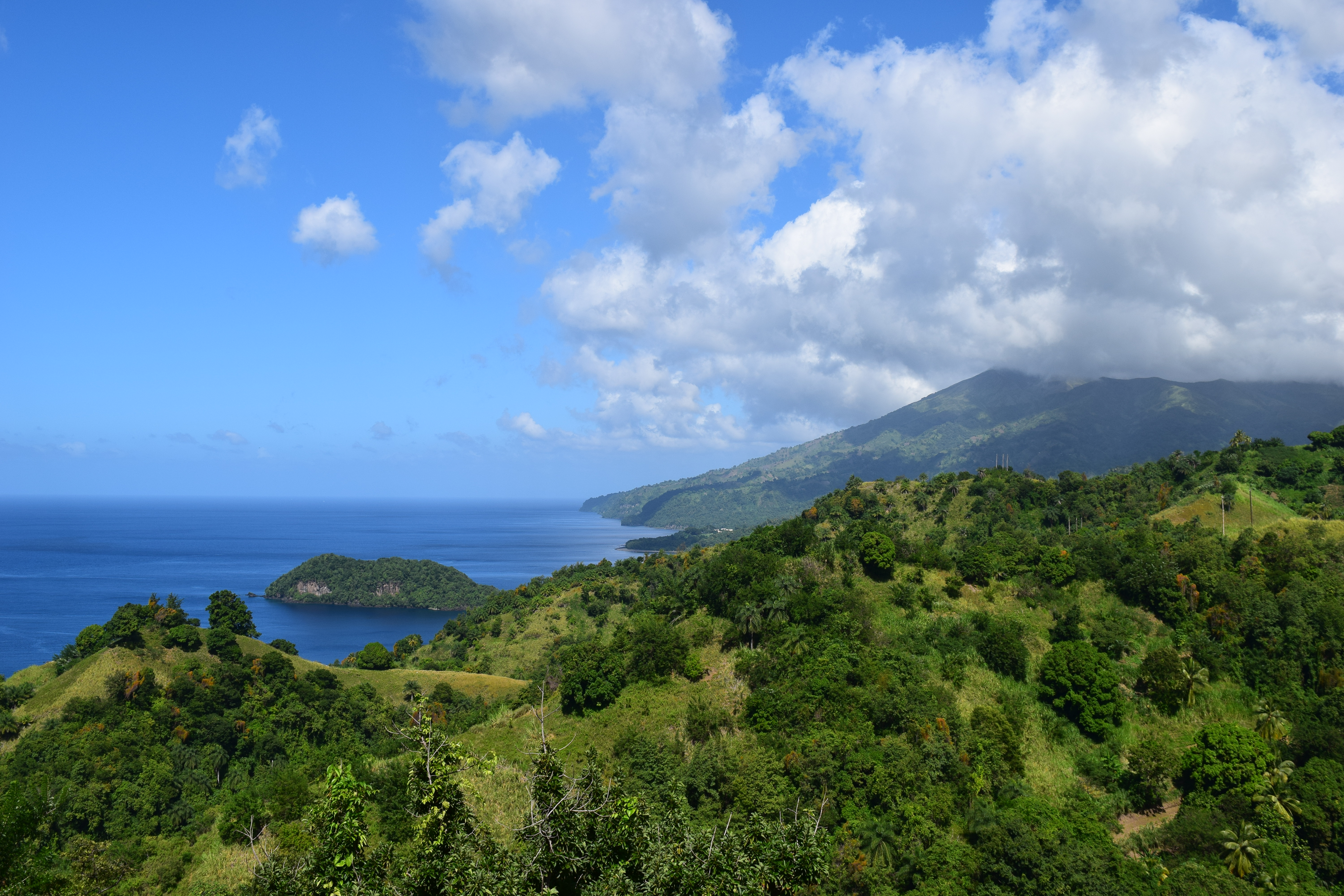
- View of Saint Vincent

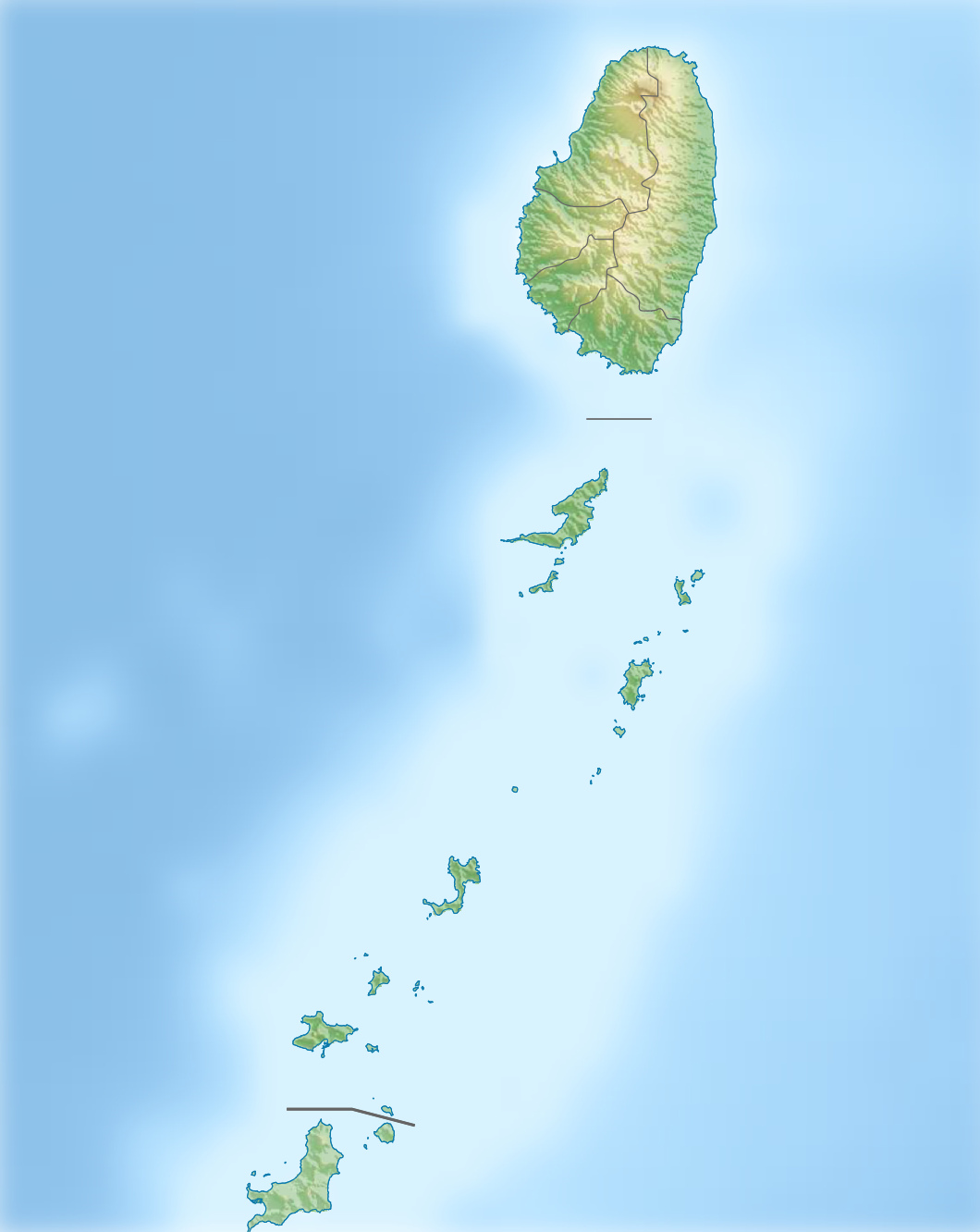
- Saint Vincent Island Location in the Lesser Antilles Location in the Caribbean

Geography
- Location: Caribbean Sea on the West Coast; Atlantic Ocean on the East Coast.
- Coordinates: 13°15′N 61°12′W
- Archipelago: Windward Islands
- Area: 345 km^{2} (133 sq mi)
- Length: 18 mi (29 km)
- Width: 11 mi (18 km)
- Highest point: La Soufrière; 4,048 ft (1,234 m)

Administration
- Saint Vincent and the Grenadines
- Parishes: 6
- Constituencies: 15
- Largest settlement: Kingstown (pop. 25,418)

Demographics
- Population: 100,000 (2012)
- Pop. density: 347.83/km^{2} (900.88/sq mi)
- Ethnic groups: Black 66%, East Indian 6%, Garifuna 2%, Mixed Race 19%, White 4%, Other 3%.

Saint Vincent is a volcanic island in the southern Caribbean. It is the largest island of the country Saint Vincent and the Grenadines and is located in the Caribbean Sea, between Saint Lucia and Grenada. It is composed of partially submerged volcanic mountains. Its largest volcano and the country's highest peak, La Soufrière, is active, with the latest episode of volcanic activity having begun in December 2020 and intensifying in April 2021.

There were major territory wars between the indigenous population of the Black Caribs, also called the Garifuna, and Great Britain in the 18th century, before the island was ceded to the British in 1763, and again in 1783. Saint Vincent and the Grenadines gained independence from the United Kingdom on 27 October 1979, and became part of the British Commonwealth of Nations thereafter. Approximately 100,000 people currently live on the island, and the population saw significant migration to the UK in the early 1900s and between the 1940s and 1980s. There has also been a significant migration to Canada, and other larger neighbouring Anglo-Caribbean islands. The main island consists of the capital Kingstown, with the rest of the island divided into five main coastal strip towns: Layou, Barrouallie, Chateaubelair, Georgetown, and Calliaqua.

== People ==
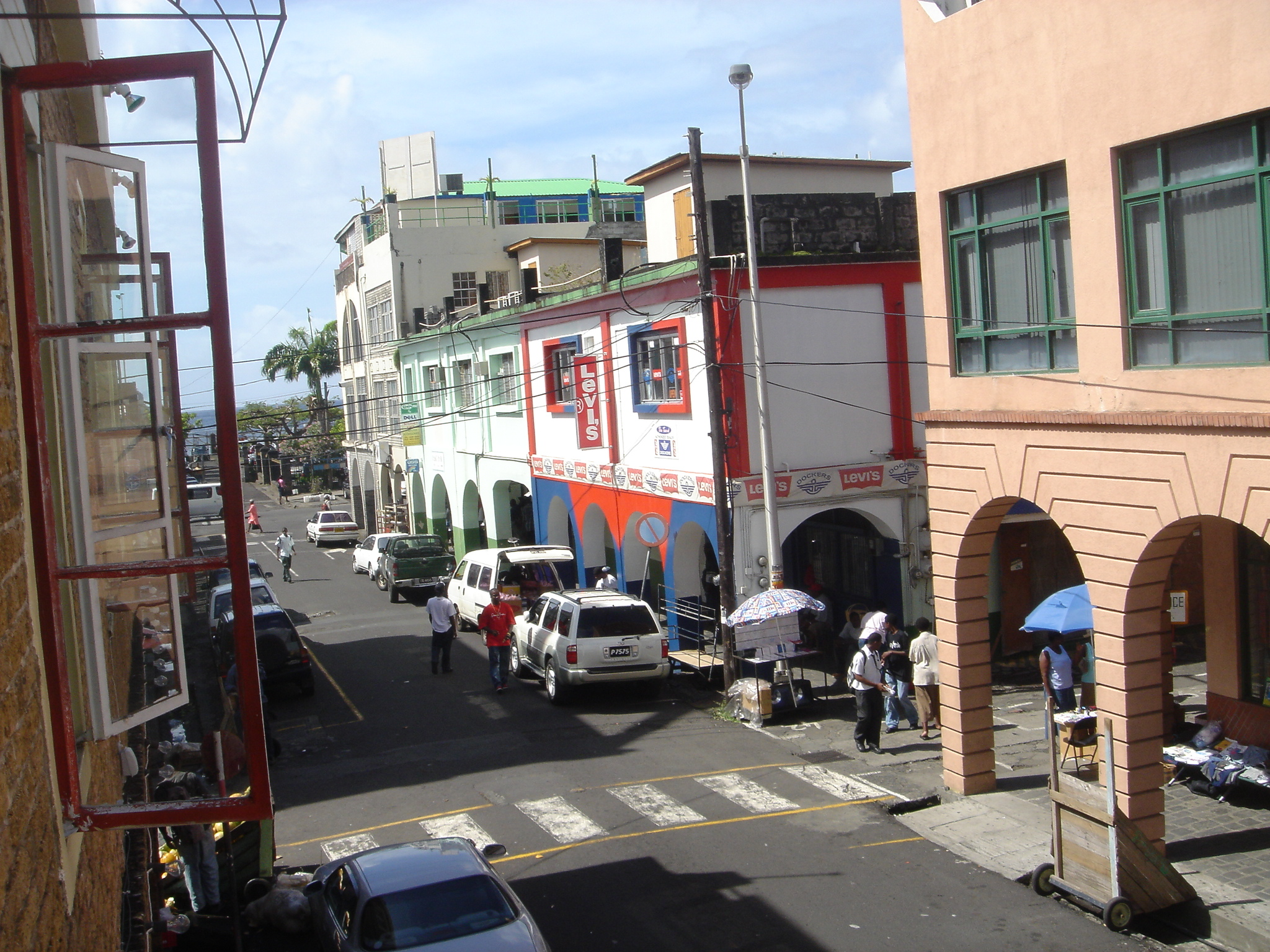
Kingstown, Saint Vincent

The people of Saint Vincent and the Grenadines are formally called Vincentians; colloquially, they are known as "Vincies" or "Vincys". The majority of the island's population is of Afro-Vincentian descent. However, a sizable portion of the population consists of Black Carib descendants, white descendants of English colonists, Portuguese descendants of indentured servants, and a significant number of Indo-Vincentians, descendants of indentured workers with Indian heritage. There is also a sizable mixed-race minority (19%).

In 2012, the population of the island was approximately 130,000. The main religions are Anglican (47%), Methodist (10%), Roman Catholic (13%), other Protestant denominations such as Seventh-day Adventism and Spiritual baptism, as well as Hinduism.

Adult literacy was 88.1% in 2004. Infant mortality in 2006 was 17 per 1,000 live births, and life expectancy for men stood at 69 years, 74 years for women. The active workforce in 2006 was 57,695, and unemployment in 2004 was 12%.

== History ==
Before 1498, the island was called Hairouna by its indigenous inhabitants. Christopher Columbus named the island Saint Vincent, since it is said to have been discovered on 22 January, the feast day of the patron saint of Lisbon and Valencia, Vincent of Saragossa.

The Spanish conquistadors embarked on slaving expeditions in and around St. Vincent following royal sanction in 1511, driving the inhabitants to the rugged interior, but the Spanish were not able to settle the island. In the 1500s, Columbus and the conquistadors noted there was a significantly large African population living amongst the native population, whom they assumed had come from shipwrecked slave ships or escaped from St. Lucia or Grenada to seek refuge in St. Vincent. They were called "Black Caribs", but are now known as Garifuna.

The large population aggressively prevented European settlement on St. Vincent until the 18th century.

=== French colony ===
The first Europeans to occupy St. Vincent were the French. However, following a series of wars and peace treaties, these islands were eventually ceded to the British. While the English were the first to lay claim to St. Vincent in 1627, the French, centred on the island of Martinique, became the first Europeans to invade the island, establishing their first colony at Barrouallie on the leeward side of St. Vincent in 1719. Enslaved Africans were forced to cultivate coffee, tobacco, indigo, corn, and sugar on plantations operated by the French colonizers. Under French dominion, Saint Vincent was known as Ile Saint Marcouf.

St. Vincent was ceded to Britain by the Treaty of Paris (1763), after which friction between the British and the indigenous people led to the First Carib War. Upon taking control of the island in 1763, the British laid the foundations of Fort Charlotte which was completed in 1806. The island was reverted to French rule in 1779, then regained by the British under the Treaty of Versailles (1783). Between 1793 and 1796, the Black Caribs, led by their chief, Joseph Chatoyer, fought a series of battles against the British. The combat ultimately ended in a treaty, after which 5,000 Garifuna were exiled to the smaller island of Baliceaux off the coast of Bequia. Conflict between the British and the indigenous peoples continued until 1796, when General Ralph Abercromby ended a revolt fomented by the radical Victor Hugues. The British deported more than 5,000 Black Caribs to Roatán, an island off the coast of Honduras.

=== British colony ===
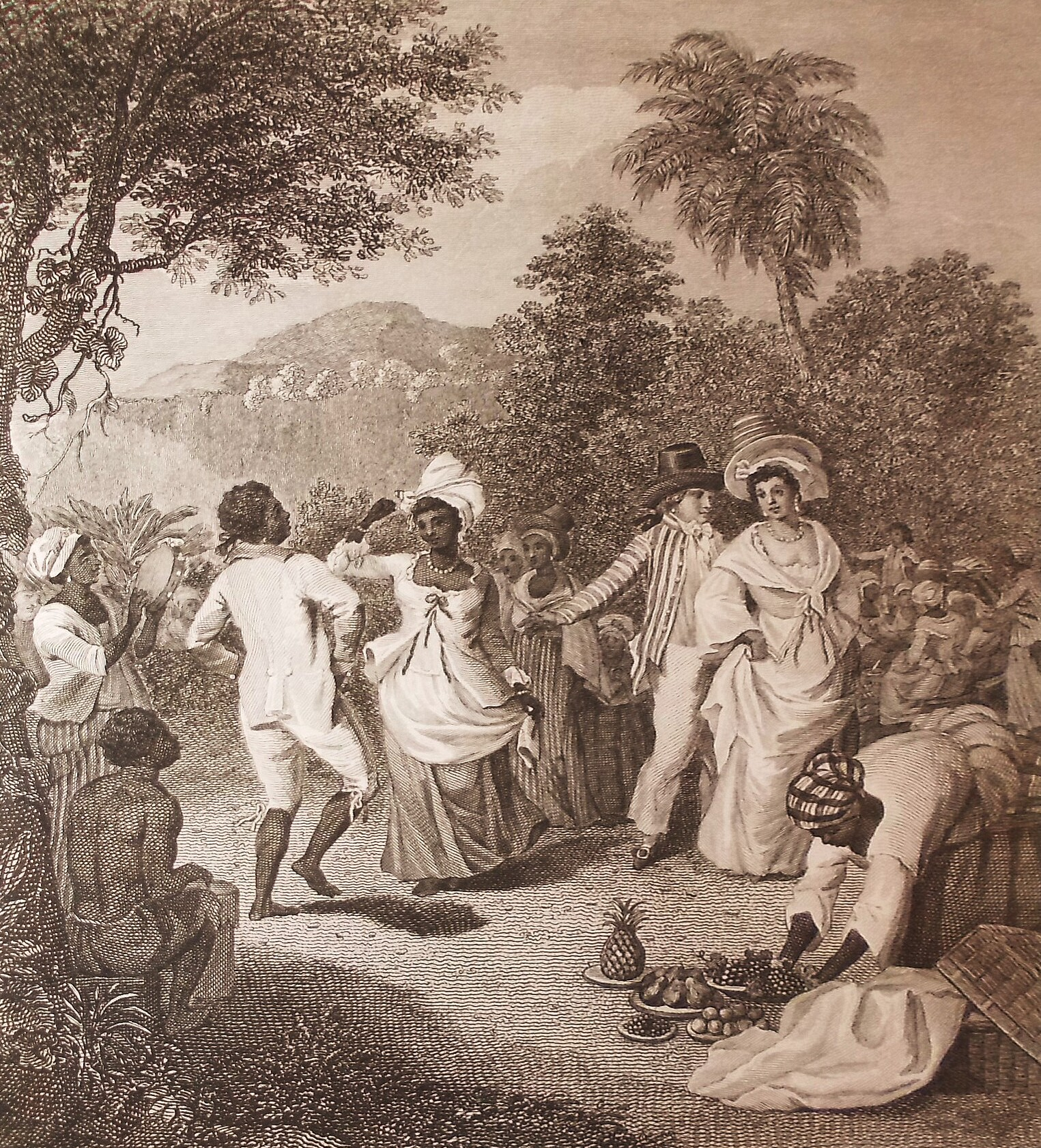
c. 1801 engraving of an earlier Agostino Brunias painting titled A Negro Festival drawn from Nature in the Island of St Vincent

From 1763 until independence, St. Vincent passed through various stages of colonial status under the British. A representative assembly was authorized in 1776. The British abolished slavery in 1834. Like the French before them, the British made enslaved Africans work plantations of sugar, coffee, indigo, tobacco, cotton and cocoa until full emancipation in 1838. The resulting labour shortages on the plantations attracted Portuguese immigrants, many of them of Jewish descent, in the 1840s, and East Indians in the 1860s as laborers.

After emancipation, the economy began a period of decline, with many landowners abandoning their estates and leaving the land to be cultivated by liberated slaves. Conditions remained harsh for both former slaves and immigrant agricultural workers, as depressed world sugar prices kept the economy stagnant until the turn of the 20th century. The Opobo king Jaja was exiled to St. Vincent after his 1887 arrest by the British for shipping cargoes of palm oil directly to Liverpool without the intermediation of the National African Company.

A Crown Colony government was installed in 1877, a Legislative Council created in 1925, and universal adult suffrage granted in 1951. During this period, the British made several unsuccessful attempts to affiliate St. Vincent with other Windward Islands in order to govern the region through a unified administration. The most notable was the West Indies Federation, which collapsed in 1962. Life on the island was made even harder following two eruptions of the La Soufriere volcano in 1812 and 1902 when much of the island was destroyed and many people were killed. The volcano erupted again in 1979, with no fatalities, and in 2020–2021.

== Self-rule and independence ==
St. Vincent and the Grenadines was granted associate statehood status by Britain on 27 October 1969, giving it complete control over its internal affairs. Following a referendum in 1979, St. Vincent and the Grenadines became the last of the Windward Islands to gain independence, on 27 October 1979, though it remains a member of the Commonwealth of Nations. It celebrates Independence Day every year on 27 October.

== Geography ==
The island of Saint Vincent is in the Lesser Antilles chain; it is 29 kilometres (18 mi) long and 18 kilometres (11 mi) wide, and it is located 160 kilometres (99 mi) west of Barbados.

It is very mountainous and heavily forested. It has a 1,234-metre (4,049 ft) active volcano, La Soufriere, which erupted violently in 1812 and 1902. The most recent eruption was on 9 April 2021, which resulted in the evacuation of 20,000 residents.

The island has a total surface area of 344 square kilometres (133 sq mi), or about 88% of the total country area, 19 times that of the country's second largest island Bequia. The coastline measures about 84 kilometres (52 mi).

The climate is tropical and humid, with an average temperature of between 18 and 31 °C (64 and 88 °F) depending on altitude. More than 95% of the beaches on the mainland have black sand, while most of the beaches in the Grenadines have white sand.

For many years, this sand was used in the building industry. During recent times, because of destruction to the coastal areas, the government has restricted the amount of sand that may be removed from beaches, as well as the specific beaches from which sand may be removed. The sand is still used in construction of metalled (gravel) roads, as it blends in with the colour of the asphalt used for road construction.

=== Biodiversity ===
Parrot Reserve (Richmond Forest Reserve)
- IUCN category IV (habitat/species management area)
- Interactive map of Parrot Reserve (Richmond Forest Reserve)
- Coordinates: 13°16′42″N 61°11′00″W
- Area: 1,171.2 km^{2} (452.2 sq mi)
- Website: www.protectedplanet.net/parrot-reserve-richmond-forest-reserve-wildlife-reserve

Saint Vincent is home to endemic birds, including the lesser Antillean Tanager, the whistling warbler, and the Saint Vincent amazon. Some pockets of tropical rainforest are left on the volcanic hills. Two species of reptile which are native to Saint Vincent are named for the island, Chironius vincenti and Sphaerodactylus vincenti.

=== Volcanic activity ===
On 9 April 2021, the first 2021 eruption of La Soufrière occurred, and another "explosive event" was reported two days later; eruptions were expected to continue for some time. Approximately 16,000 people were required to evacuate the area of their homes. Prime Minister Ralph Gonsalves made this comment to the news media: "water supplies to most of the island had been cut off, and its airspace closed because of the smoke and thick plumes of volcanic ash moving through the atmosphere". An official added: "we are covered in ash and strong sulphur scents pervade the air ... take the necessary precautions to remain safe and healthy". Carnival Cruise Line and Royal Caribbean International sent five ships in total, with a capacity of 7,500, to assist with the evacuation. Barbados dispatched a "humanitarian assistance and disaster response" mission to the island.

Additional "explosive events" occurred on 11 April and on 12 April. On that latter day, the volcano "continued to erupt explosively" and was generating "pyroclastic flows" that were "destroying everything in its path".

== Popular culture events ==
In 2002, Saint Vincent was one of the filming locations for the American adventure fantasy film Pirates of the Caribbean: The Curse of the Black Pearl. Filming took place from October 2002 through to March 2003, and several hundreds of the local inhabitants were hired as cast members.

== Educational institutions ==
Saint Vincent is home to a number of international accrediting medical schools:

1. All Saints University School of Medicine
2. Saint James School of Medicine
3. Trinity School of Medicine
4. American University of St. Vincent School of Medicine

In addition to the international schools, Saint Vincent is home to local educational schools.

== See also ==
- 1898 Windward Islands Hurricane
