= Demographics of Saint Vincent and the Grenadines =

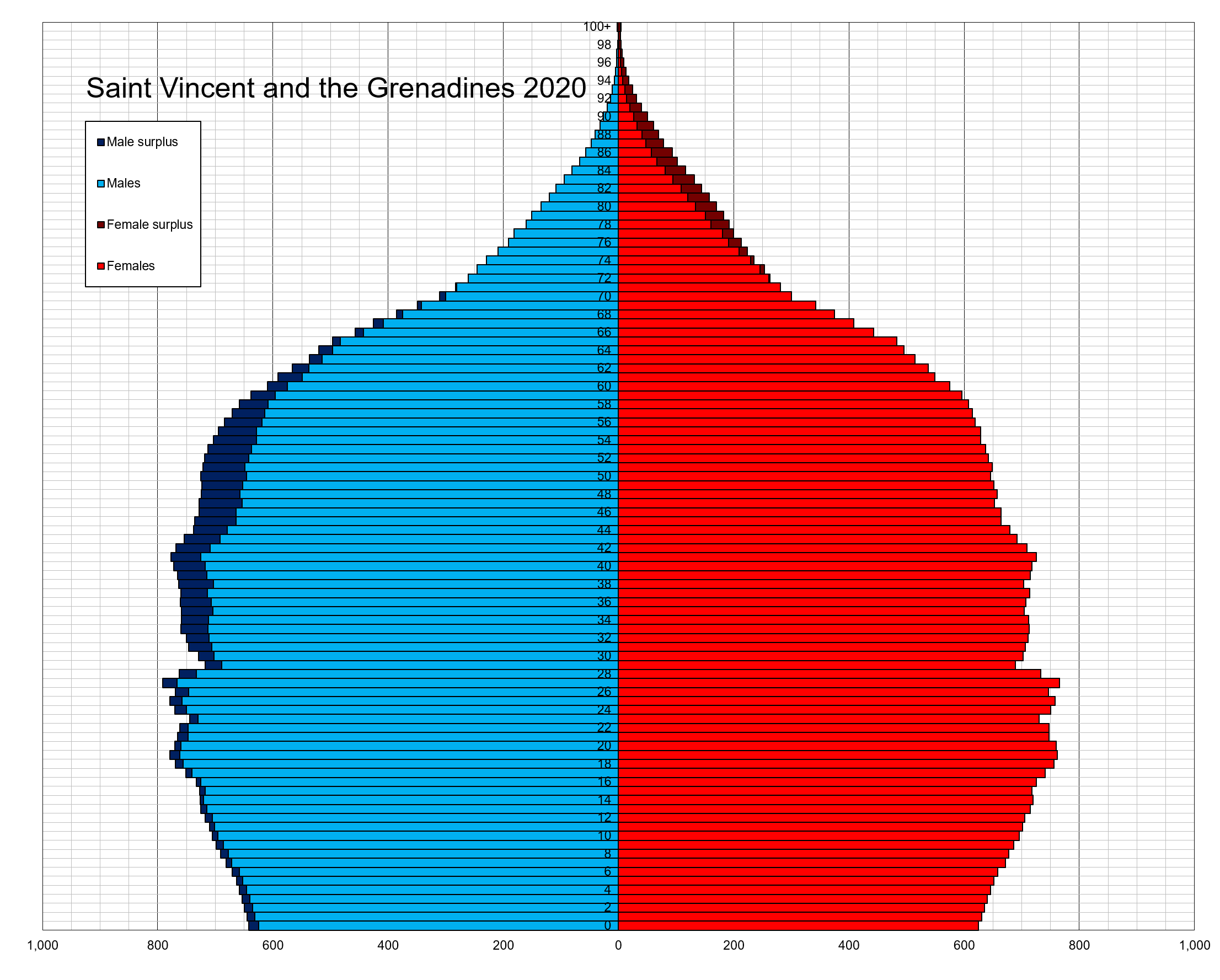
- Population pyramid of Saint Vincent and the Grenadines in 2020
- Population: 100,969 (2022 est.)
- Growth rate: -0.17% (2022 est.)
- Birth rate: 12.27 births/1,000 population (2022 est.)
- Death rate: 7.49 deaths/1,000 population (2022 est.)
- Net migration rate: -6.47 migrant(s)/1,000 population (2022 est.)

Age structure
- 0–14 years: 20.15%
- 65 and over: 10.72%

Nationality
- Major ethnic: African descent (71.2%)

The demography of the population of Saint Vincent and the Grenadines includes population density, ethnicity, religious affiliations and other aspects of the population.

== Population size and structure ==
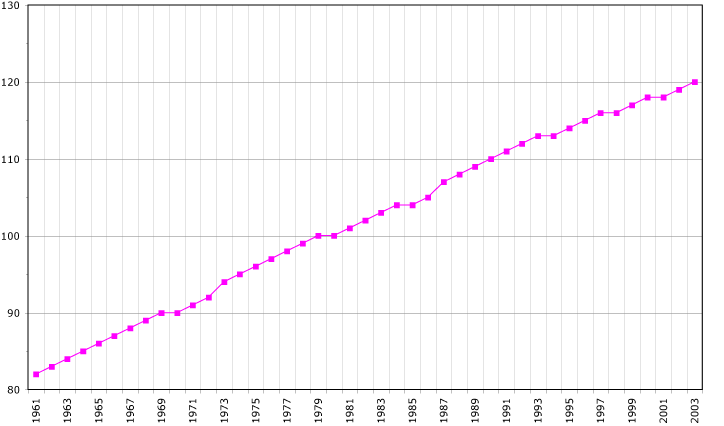
Population of Saint Vincent and the Grenadines, Data of FAO, year 2005; Number of inhabitants in thousands

Census population and average annual growth rate

Year	Pop.	±% p.a.
1871	35,688	—
1881	40,548	+1.28%
1891	41,054	+0.12%
1911	41,877	+0.10%
1921	44,447	+0.60%
1931	47,961	+0.76%
1946	61,647	+1.69%

Year	Pop.	±% p.a.
1960	79,948	+1.87%
1970	86,944	+0.84%
1980	97,845	+1.19%
1991	107,598	+0.87%
2001	109,022	+0.13%
2012	109,991	+0.08%
2023	109,296	−0.06%

Note: Pop. numbers for 2012, 2001, and 1991 represent total populations, while pop. numbers for previous years exclude institutional populations.

According to the 2012 census, Saint Vincent and the Grenadines had a total population of 109,991, an increase of 969 since the 2001 census. While the country's population continues to increase, annual growth has slowed since the 1991 census.

The estimated population for 2021 is 104,332 (per the 2022 revision of the World Population Prospects).

=== Structure of the population ===
Population Estimates by Sex and Age Group (01.VII.2008) (Because of rounding, totals are not in all cases the sum of the respective components. Unrevised data.):

Age group	Male	Female	Total	%
Total	50 009	49 077	99 086	100
0–4	4 782	4 520	9 302	9.39
5–9	5 352	5 332	10 684	10.78
10–14	5 269	5 122	10 391	10.49
15–19	5 293	5 238	10 531	10.63
20–24	4 639	4 420	9 060	9.14
25–29	4 057	3 884	7 941	8.01
30–34	3 747	3 408	7 155	7.22
35–39	3 911	3 614	7 525	7.59
40–44	3 214	3 029	6 243	6.30
45–49	2 252	2 158	4 410	4.45
50–54	1 807	1 674	3 481	3.51
55–59	1 299	1 296	2 595	2.62
60–64	1 222	1 328	2 550	2.57
65–69	1 143	1 236	2 379	2.40
70–74	831	989	1 819	1.84
75–79	591	821	1 412	1.43
80–84	359	520	879	0.89
85+	241	488	729	0.74
Age group	Male	Female	Total	Percent
0–14	15 403	14 974	30 377	30.66
15–64	31 441	30 049	61 490	62.06
65+	3 165	4 054	7 219	7.29

Population Estimates by Sex and Age Group (01.VII.2021):

Age group	Male	Female	Total	%
Total	56 826	53 958	110 784	100
0–4	4 413	4 357	8 770	7.92
5–9	4 407	4 237	8 644	7.80
10–14	5 158	4 746	9 904	8.94
15–19	5 169	4 888	10 057	9.08
20–24	4 454	4 278	8 732	7.88
25–29	4 325	4 113	8 438	7.62
30–34	3 976	4 000	7 976	7.20
35–39	3 927	3 736	7 663	6.92
40–44	3 859	3 403	7 262	6.56
45–49	3 950	3 627	7 576	6.84
50–54	3 515	3 131	6 645	6.00
55–59	2 703	2 403	5 106	4.61
60–64	2 015	1 862	3 877	3.50
65–69	1 490	1 392	2 883	2.60
70–74	1 311	1 262	2 573	2.32
75–79	985	1 021	2 006	1.81
80–84	678	785	1 463	1.32
85+	491	716	1 207	1.09
Age group	Male	Female	Total	Percent
0–14	13 978	13 340	27 318	24.66
15–64	37 893	35 442	73 335	66.20
65+	4 955	5 176	10 131	9.14

== Vital statistics ==
	Average population	Live births	Deaths	Natural change	Crude birth rate (per 1000)	Crude death rate (per 1000)	Natural change (per 1000)	Total fertility rate	Infant mortality rate
1950	67,000	2,662	1,022	1,640	39.7	15.3	24.5		
1951	68,000	2,930	990	1,940	43.0	14.5	28.5		
1952	69,000	2,906	1,117	1,789	42.0	16.1	25.8		
1953	71,000	3,069	1,127	1,942	43.5	16.0	27.5		
1954	72,000	3,117	1,125	1,992	43.3	15.6	27.7		
1955	74,000	3,607	1,102	2,505	49.1	15.0	34.1		
1956	75,000	3,601	937	2,664	48.0	12.5	35.5		
1957	77,000	4,261	985	3,276	55.6	12.9	42.7		
1958	78,000	3,930	1,223	2,707	50.3	15.6	34.6		
1959	80,000	4,051	1,141	2,910	50.9	14.3	36.6		
1960	81,000	3,985	1,210	2,775	49.2	14.9	34.3		
1961	82,000	3,968	1,024	2,944	48.3	12.5	35.8		
1962	83,000	3,727	957	2,770	44.8	11.5	33.3		
1963	84,000	3,637	1,006	2,631	43.2	12.0	31.3		
1964	85,000	3,678	821	2,857	43.2	9.7	33.6		
1965	86,000	3,770	831	2,939	43.9	9.7	34.2		
1966	87,000	3,809	829	2,980	43.9	9.5	34.3		
1967	88,000	3,574	775	2,799	40.7	8.8	31.9		
1968	89,000	3,324	825	2,499	37.5	9.3	28.2		
1969	90,000	3,093	883	2,210	34.6	9.9	24.7		
1970	90,000	3,327	737	2,590	36.8	8.1	28.6		
1971	91,000	3,714	734	2,980	40.6	8.0	32.6		
1972	92,000	3,705	890	2,815	40.1	9.6	30.4		
1973	94,000	3,243	990	2,253	34.7	10.6	24.1		
1974	95,000	3,373	716	2,657	35.7	7.6	28.1		
1975	96,000	3,398	724	2,674	35.5	7.6	28.0		
1976	97,000	3,786	724	3,062	39.2	7.5	31.7		
1977	98,000	3,152	732	2,420	32.3	7.5	24.8		
1978	99,000	3,275	745	2,530	33.2	7.6	25.7		
1979	100,000	3,409	693	2,716	34.2	7.0	27.3		
1980	101,000	3,075	724	2,351	30.6	7.2	23.4		
1981	101,000	3,227	772	2,455	31.8	7.6	24.2		
1982	102,000	3,352	717	2,635	32.8	7.0	25.8		
1983	103,000	3,295	779	2,516	32.0	7.6	24.4		
1984	104,000	2,831	703	2,128	27.3	6.8	20.5		
1986	105,000	2,708	655	2,053	25.7	6.2	19.5		
1988	107,000	2,537	712	1,825	23.8	6.7	17.1		
1990	108,000	2,552	686	1,866	23.7	6.4	17.4		
1991	108,000	2,591	654	1,937	24.0	6.1	18.0		
1992	108,000	2,686	714	1,972	24.9	6.6	18.3		
1993	108,000	2,687	680	2,007	24.9	6.3	18.6		
1994	108,000	2,549	732	1,817	23.6	6.8	16.8		
1995	108,000	2,614	730	1,884	24.2	6.8	17.4		
1996	108,000	2,338	792	1,546	21.6	7.3	14.3		
1997	108,000	2,311	736	1,575	21.4	6.8	14.6		
1998	108,000	2,112	830	1,282	19.6	7.7	11.9		
1999	108,000	2,171	833	1,338	20.1	7.7	12.4		
2000	108,000	2,149	700	1,449	19.9	6.5	13.4		
2001	108,000	2,109	765	1,344	19.5	7.1	12.4		
2002	108,000	1,985	766	1,219	18.4	7.1	11.3		
2003	109,198	1,923	790	1,133	17.6	7.2	10.4	2.1	
2004	109,286	1,804	812	992	16.5	7.4	9.1	2.0	
2005	109,374	1,779	813	966	16.3	7.4	8.9	1.9	16.3
2006	109,462	1,796	777	1,019	16.4	7.2	9.2	2.1	27.8
2007	109,551	1,822	779	1,043	16.6	7.1	9.5	2.0	18.7
2008	109,639	1,901	848	1,053	17.3	7.7	9.6	2.1	19.4
2009	109,727	1,905	777	1,128	17.4	7.1	10.3	2.235	18.3
2010	109,814	1,784	827	957	16.2	7.5	8.7	2.253	21.3
2011	109,903	1,725	882	843	15.7	8.0	7.7	1.892	22.0
2012	109,991	1,840	858	982	16.7	7.8	8.9	2.213	13.6
2013	110,079	1,738	926	812	15.8	8.4	7.4	2.090	18.4
2014	110,166	1,841	1,006	835	16.7	9.1	7.6	2.211	15.8
2015	110,255	1,813	885	928	16.4	8.3	8.1	2.188	14.3
2016	110,343	1,729	930	799	15.8	8.0	7.8	2.102	14.5
2017	110,431	1,539	911	628	13.9	8.2	5.7	1.858	11.0
2018	110,520	1,524	965	559	13.8	8.7	5.1	1.848	14.4
2019	110,608	1,426	1,023	403	12.9	9.2	3.7	1.739	10.5
2020	110,696	1,320	1,046	274	11.9	9.4	2.5	1.598	15.9
2021	110,784	1,370	1,183	187	12.4	10.7	1.7	1.756	16.8
2022	110,872	1,264	1,093	171	11.4	9.9	1.5	1.542	15.8
2023		1,212	667	545	10.9	6.1	4.8	1.47	17.3

== Ethnic groups ==
Ethnic groups in the Saint Vincent and the Grenadines
Ethnic groups	percent
African	66%
Mixed	19%
East Indian	6%
European	4%
Other	3%
Carib Amerindian	2%

Saint Vincents's population is predominantly African (77,764 in 2012; 71.2% of the total population) or of mixed African-European descent (25,111; 27.6%). 1.1% of the population is East Indian (1,199 residents in 2001) and 1.5% white (753 Portuguese and 889 other white).

Saint Vincent & the Grenadines also has a small Indigenous (Amerindian/Carib) population. During the past decades the Indigenous population changed from 3,347 at the 1991 census (3.1% of the population) to 3,898 at the 2001 census (3.6% of the population) to 3,280 at the 2012 census (3.0% of the population).

Black Caribs are originally from the island of Saint Vincent, formed in the 18th century by the mixture between Kalinago and enslaved Africans who escaped. A part of their community (now known as Garifuna) was expelled from St. Vincent in 1797 and exported to the island of Roatán, Honduras, from where they migrated to the Caribbean coast of the mainland of Central America and spread as far as Belize and Nicaragua. While the Garifuna have retained their Kalinago language, the Black Caribs of Saint Vincent and the Grenadines speak Creole English.

The remaining 0.8% of the population includes Chinese and people from the Middle East.

== Language ==
While the official language is English, most Vincentians speak Vincentian Creole, an English-based creole, as their mother tongue. English is used in education, government, religion, and other formal domains, while Creole (or "dialect" as it is referred to locally) is used in informal situations such as in the home and among friends.

== Religion ==
Religious population in Saint Vincent and the Grenadines (2023 census)
Religion	Population	%
Pentecostalism	28.725	26.4
Seventh day-Adventist	16.078	11.6
Anglican	11.388	10.5
Baptist	10.782	9.9
Methodist	6.898	6.3
Roman Catholic	4.796	4.4
Evangelicalism	4.625	4.3
Jehovah's Witnesses	636	0.6
Salvation Army	221	0.2
Presbyterian or Congregational	162	0.1
Rastafarianism	900	0.8
Muslim	222	0.2
Hinduism	91	0.1
Not stated	3.934	3.6
Not religious	15.174	14.0
Other religious affiliation	3.465	3.2
TOTAL	108.764	100.0

Protestant 75% (Anglican 47%, Methodist 28%), Roman Catholic 13%, other (includes Hindu, Seventh-Day Adventist, other Protestant) 12%.

According to the 2001 census, 81.5% of the population of Saint Vincent and the Grenadines is considered Christian, 6.7% has another religion and 8.8% has no religion or did not state a religion (1.5%).

According to the 2012 census, 82.3% of the population identifies as Christian (mainly Pentecostal, Anglican or Seventh-day Adventists); 7.5% have no religion, and there are groups of Rastafarians, Muslims, Hindus, Jews and Baha’is.

Between 1991 and 2001 the number of Anglicans, Brethren, Methodists and Roman Catholics decreased, while the number of Pentecostals, Evangelicals and Seventh-day Adventists increased.

Islam is followed by a minuscule minority. Due to secular nature of the country's constitution, Muslims are free to proselytize and build places of worship in the country. According to the United States Department of State, Islam is a minority religion in Saint Vincent and the Grenadines, with 2,000 Muslims (approximately 1.5% of the total population) living in the island nation.
