= Baliceaux =

Small island in the Caribbean

Native name: Balliceaux
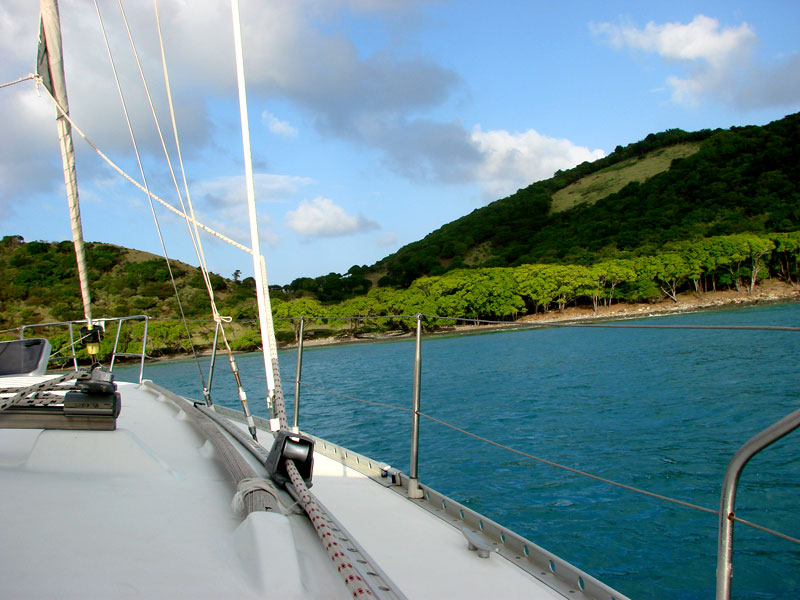
- Baliceaux Island

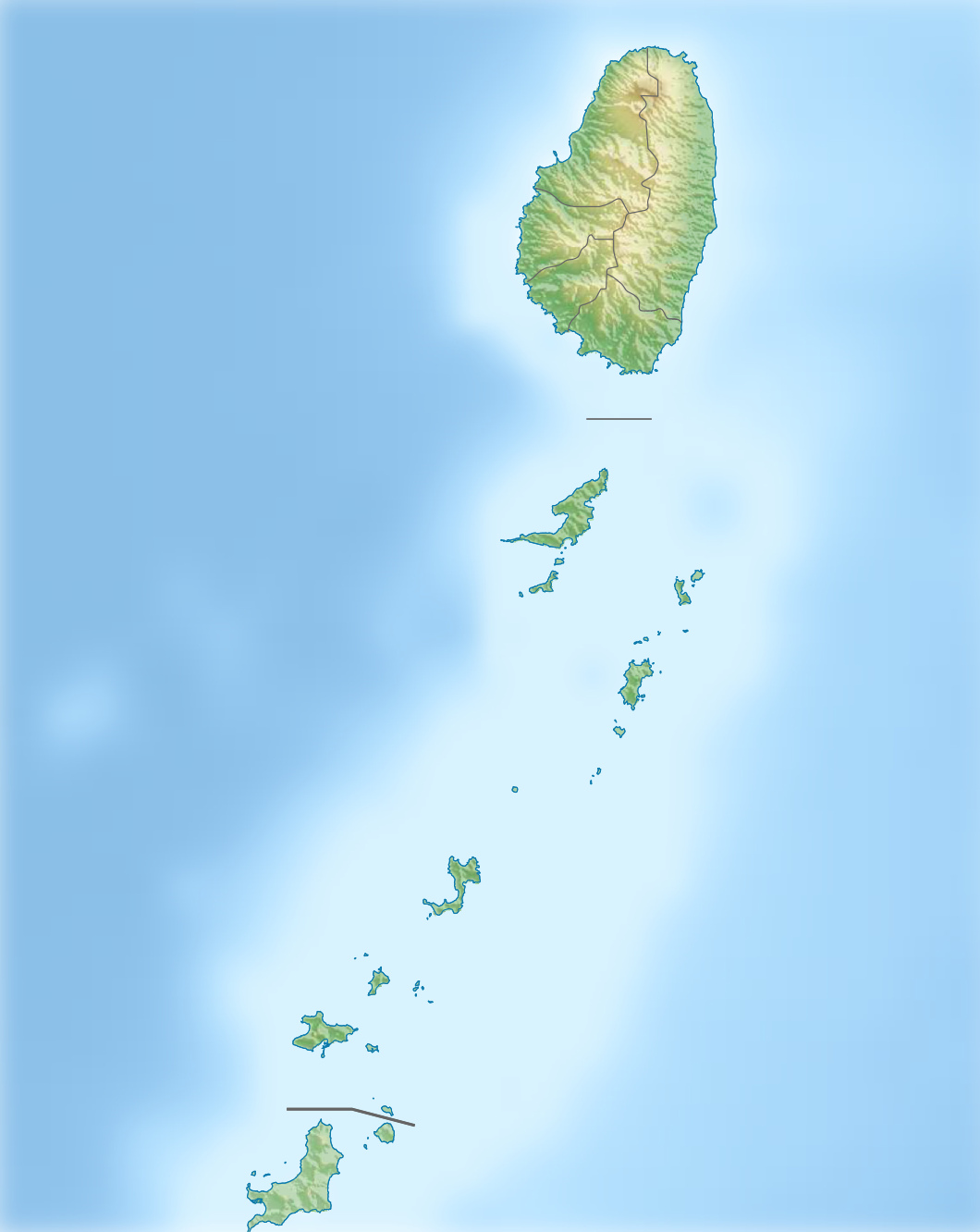
- Location within Saint Vincent and the Grenadines Location within Lesser Antilles Location within the Caribbean

Geography
- Location: Caribbean
- Coordinates: 12°57′00″N 61°08′45″W
- Archipelago: Grenadines
- Area: 320 acres (130 ha)
- Highest point: 126 m. Gun Hill

Administration
- Saint Vincent and the Grenadines

Additional information
- Time zone: AST (UTC-4)
private island
Balliceaux Island Cultural Landmark
- IUCN category III (natural monument or feature)
- Interactive map of Balliceaux Island Cultural Landmark
- Area: 142.07 km^{2} (54.85 sq mi)
- Established: proposed

Baliceaux is a small Caribbean island and is one of the Grenadines chain of islands which lie between the larger islands of Saint Vincent and Grenada. Politically, it is part of the nation of Saint Vincent and the Grenadines.

== History ==
The first European explorers to become aware of the islands were Spanish navigators during the fifteenth century. It attained prominence during wars 1769–1795 within the Caribbean region. The island's highest point, Gun Hill, served as an observation station for soldiers between 1772–1797.

In the 1790s, British colonial authorities deported about 5,000 Garifuna to Baliceaux following the suppression of the Second Carib War under Joseph Chatoyer in Saint Vincent. Due to starvation, disease, and sickness from exposure to the elements on the undeveloped island, more than half of the deportees died on Baliceaux. The British subsequently resettled approximately 2,500 survivors to the island of Roatan, Honduras. Their descendants live today in Honduras, Belize, Guatemala, Nicaragua and the United States.

The graves and remains of those who died on Baliceaux have never been officially marked or excavated; the island is essentially a graveyard.

Every March, Pilgrimage to Balliceaux is held to commemorate these event. It coincides with National Hero's Day in St. Vincent. The privately owned island was offered for sale in 2023, with an asking price of US$30m; the prime minister of Saint Vincent and the Grenadines intended in 2025 to acquire the island for the nation. In March 2025, the Prime Minister of Saint Vincent and the Grenadines, Ralph Gonsalves, announced in parliament that the government had acquired Baliceaux due to its historical and cultural significance to the Garifuna people. He stated that the former owners would be given "fair compensation within a reasonable time".

== See also ==
- First Carib War
- Second Carib War
