= India–Saint Vincent and the Grenadines relations =

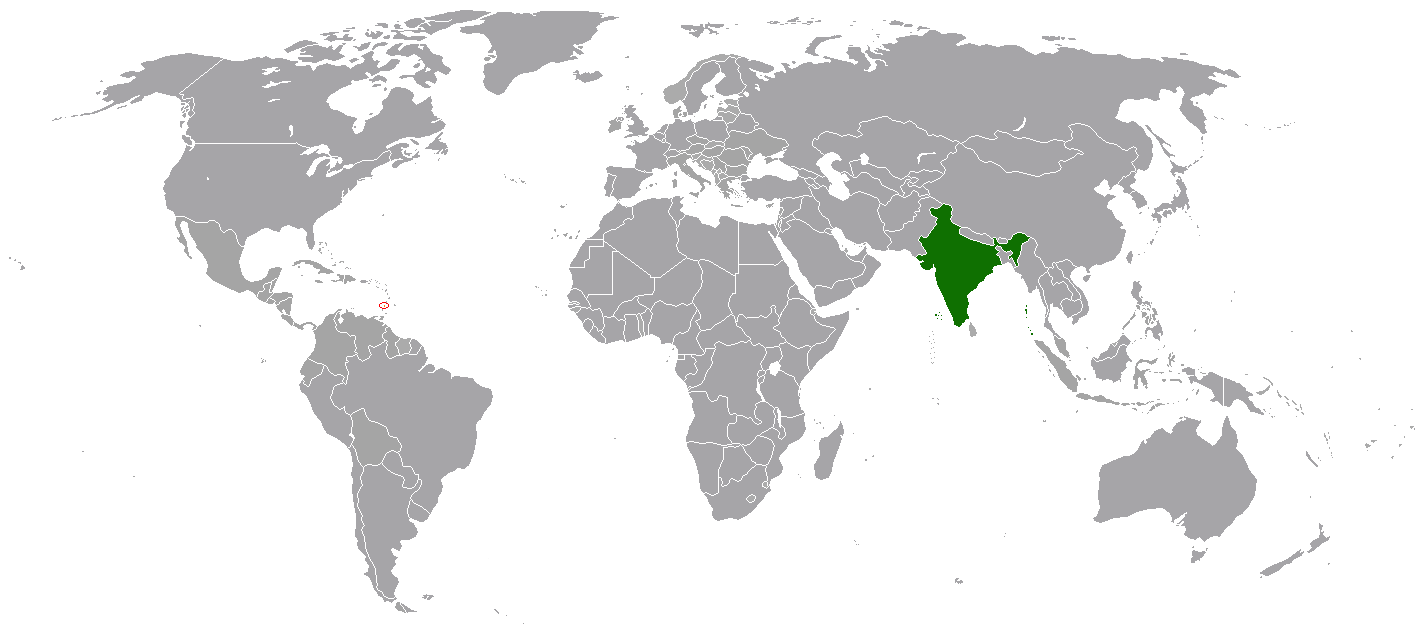
- India: Saint Vincent and the Grenadines

India–Saint Vincent and the Grenadines relations refers to the international relations that exist between India and Saint Vincent and the Grenadines. The Embassy of India in Paramaribo, Suriname is concurrently accredited to Saint Vincent and the Grenadines.

== History ==
Relations between India and Saint Vincent and the Grenadines date back to the mid-19th century when both countries were British colonies. The first Indians in Saint Vincent and the Grenadines arrived at the western end of the Kingstown in the suburb of Edinboro on 1 June 1861 on board the Travancore. The ship had departed from Madras on 26 February 1861 with 258 Indians indentured workers on board. Two births occurred during the voyage. Eight ships transported indentured labourers from India to Saint Vincent and the Grenadines the next two decades. The last ship carrying Indian indentured workers, the Lightning, arrived on the island on 22 May 1880. In total, nearly 2,500 Indians were brought to Saint Vincent and the Grenadines, excluding those who died during the voyages. By 1884, around 1,100 returned to India after completing their indenture period. The Indians that remained in Saint Vincent and the Grenadines are the origin of the Indo-Vincentian community.

Minister of Overseas Indian Affairs Vayalar Ravi visited Saint Vincent and the Grenadines to participate in the first ever Indian Arrival Day celebrations in the country on 1 June 2007. This was the first visit by an Indian minister to the country. Ravi also held bilateral talks with Prime Minister Ralph Gonsalves. Saint Vincent and the Grenadines voted for India's candidature for a Non-Permanent seat in the UN Security Council in 2011–12. The country also supported the G-4's resolution on reforms of the United Nations, and reacted positively to India's candidature for a permanent seat in the UN Security Council, although it has not formally declared its support.

Prime Ministers Narendra Modi and Ralph Gonsalves held bilateral discussions on the sidelines of UN General Assembly in New York on 24 September 2015. Both leaders expressed satisfaction over bilateral relations and discussed steps to further develop ties.

== Economic relations ==
=== Trade ===
Bilateral trade between India and Saint Vincent and the Grenadines totaled US$1.84 million in 2013–14, $760,000 in 2014–15, and $550,000 in 2015–16. India does not make any imports from Saint Vincent and the Grenadines, and the entire value of trade reflects Indian exports to the country. The main commodities exported from India to Saint Vincent and the Grenadines are textiles, iron and steel, and paper.

=== Foreign aid ===
India donated $50,000 worth of medicines to Saint Vincent and the Grenadines in early 2006. India donated $500,000 for disaster relief in the aftermath of Hurricane Tomas in December 2010, and the same amount for disaster relief in the aftermath of flash floods in Saint Vincent and the Grenadines in December 2013. Citizens of Saint Vincent and the Grenadines are eligible for scholarships under the Indian Technical and Economic Cooperation Programme.

== Cultural relations ==
The Parliament of Saint Vincent and the Grenadines enacted an Act of Parliament on 26 March 2007 officially declaring 1 June as Indian Arrival Day. The first official commemoration of the event was held on 1 June that year. The day is marked annually by a re-enactment of the landing of Indians at Indian Bay, Kingstown, followed by a procession to Heritage Square. Several Indian cultural events are also held to mark the occasion. The first International Indian Diaspora Conference was held for the first time on 1-3 June 2012. It was organized by the St. Vincent and the Grenadines Chapter of the Global Organization of People of Indian Origin International (GOPIO-SVG), in partnership with the SVG Indian Heritage Foundation, and under the patronage of the SVG Ministry of Tourism and Culture. This was the first international conference for the Indian diaspora held in the country. Similar conferences had been held in other Caribbean nations since 1975.

The Government of the Saint Vincent and the Grenadines officially designated 7 October as Indian Heritage Day.

Most of the Indo-Vincentian community no longer speak Indian languages. However, some Indian words, particularly those relating to food such as roti (bread), channa (chick pea), and karela (bitter gourd) have influenced the Vincentian language and are still used today. The term douglaa used to refer to persons of mixed African and Asian race is of Hindi origin. Indian food such as curry, roti, rice and daal are a commonly consumed as part of Vincentian cuisine.

== Indo-Vincentians ==
Indo-Vincentians are Vincentian nationals of Indian descent. They are descended from the Indian indentured workers who first arrived in the country on 1 June 1861. The Indo-Vincentian population reached nearly 5,000-10,000 by the 1950s. However, a lack of economic opportunities in the country led to most of the community subsequently emigrating to the United Kingdom, the United States, Canada and other nations. According to a 2016 estimate, Indo-Vincentians made up 6% of the country's population and were the third largest ethnic group in country, after Africans (66%) and people of mixed race (19%). As a result of interracial marriages, it is estimated that around 15% of the total population of Saint Vincent and the Grenadines is at least partially of Indian descent. The Saint Vincent and Grenadines Indian Heritage Foundation, established in October 2006, is the most prominent organization representing the Indo-Vincentian community.

There is also a small community of Indian nationals residing in Saint Vincent and the Grenadines and working as professionals such as doctors, engineers and software experts. Indian doctors have a well-established reputation in the country and many work at public hospitals or their own private practice. At least two Sindhi businessmen are involved in importing, trading, and running duty-free shops in Saint Vincent and the Grenadines as of December 2016. Additionally, most of the faculty and students at an offshore campus of a medical college in Saint Vincent and the Grenadines are Indian Americans.
