= Indo-Vincentians =

Total population
- 5,900

Regions with significant populations
- Kingstown · Calder · Richland Park · Rose Bank · Akers · Park Hill · Georgetown; High Wycombe Urban Area, England · New York City, United States · South Florida, United States · Saint Croix, U.S. Virgin Islands · Canada

Languages
- English (Vincentian Creole) · Sindhi · Hindi-Urdu · other Indian languages

Religion
- Christianity · Hinduism · Islam

Related ethnic groups
- Indo-Caribbean · People of Indian origin

Indo-Vincentians are an ethnic group in Saint Vincent and the Grenadines who are mainly descendants of indentured laborers who came in the late 19th century to the early 20th century and entrepreneurs who began immigrating in the mid-20th century from the Indian subcontinent. There are about 5,900 people of Indian origin living in the country.

== Indenture ==
=== Origin ===
The French established sugarcane plantations in Saint Vincent and the Grenadines in the 18th century using African slave labour. France ceded the colony to the British through the Treaty of Versailles in 1783. The arrival of the British also brought many Scottish slave owners to the island. Following the abolition of slavery in British colonies in the West Indies on 1 August 1838, plantation owners in the region sought to find an alternative to African slave labour. The British established Crown rule in India in 1858. Shortly thereafter, the British began offering Indians contract work in the West Indies. Poor economic conditions in colonial India, which were exacerbated by famines in the 1870s, resulted in many Indians signing up for contracts. The British Indian government required St. Vincent to enact laws regarding terms and conditions of contract service, which were enacted by in 1857. The St. Vincent Legislature also enacted export taxes to fund the acquisition of indentured workers from India. Planters who requested the service of Indian indentured workers were required to pay £1,807 (equivalent to £180,273 in 2025) towards acquisition costs, while the remaining £2,418 (equivalent to £241,228 in 2025) was funded through the export taxes and other government revenue. St. Vincent spent more than £80,600 (equivalent to £8,954,690 in 2025) to procure Indian workers by 1890. The expenditure had significant financial impact on the colony, and the cost of acquiring indentured workers led to the government neglecting to spend money on infrastructure, health and education.

Per the terms of the contracts offered, the Indian workers would be paid 10 pence (equivalent to £10 in 2025) per day working on the plantation estate. The indenture period was five years, during which they were required to live on the estate at which they worked and were prohibited from leaving it without permission. They were also barred from traveling to other Caribbean islands even after the end of their indenture period. At the end of the five-year period, Indian workers were required to sign a three-year extension, or pay a fee to exempt them from the extension. Those that agreed to the extension would also receive free housing, medical care and a free return trip to India at the end of the three-year indenture period. The system was intended to ensure that the maximum number of workers extended their contracts. The indenture contracts were amended in 1874 to increase the length of the extension period to five-years. To further persuade Indians to remain on the plantations for as long as possible, a one-time signing fee of £10 (equivalent to £998 in 2025) was also provided to workers who extended their contracts. Around 400 Indians were re-indentured in 1875.

=== Immigration ===
The first ship carrying indentured workers from India, the Travancore, departed from Madras on 26 February 1861 with 258 South Indians on board - 160 adult males, 62 adult females, 18 boys, 13 girls, and 5 infants. It arrived at the western end of the Kingstown harbour in the suburb of Edinboro on 1 June 1861. Today, the area of the landing site is known as Indian Bay. Unlike most other immigrant ships that suffered from high mortality rates, no one died during the voyage on board the Travancore. In fact, two births occurred during the voyage, meaning that the ship arrived in Saint Vincent and the Grenadines with more passengers than when it departed Madras. The Travancore was the only ship carrying Indian indentured workers to Saint Vincent and the Grenadines that departed from Madras; the others departed from Calcutta. Despite departing from Madras, official records show that only a few of the passengers came from the city. The majority were from the districts of Vizagapatam, North Arcot, Madura, Chittoor, Vellore, Bangalore, and Barempore(Perambur).

The next ship carrying Indian indentured workers to the country, the Castle Howard, arrived on 11 April 1862 at Kingstown harbour with 307 Indians on board. En route from India, the ship had stopped at St. Helena where 14 Kru African men were taken on board. This led to protests from the British India government which had only paid for the voyage of its dominion residents. Other ships that carried Indian indentured workers included the Countess of Ripon (arrived in 1866 with 214 Indians), the Newcastle (arrived on 3 June 1867 with 473 Indians), the Imperatrice Eugenie (arrived on 12 July 1869 with 349 Indians), the Dover Castle (arrived on 27 June 1871 with 325 Indians), and the Lincelles (arrived on 8 January 1875 with 333 Indians). The last ship carrying indentured Indian immigrants, the Lightning, arrived on 22 May 1880 with 214 Indians on board.

In total, 8 ships transported 2,474 Indians to Saint Vincent and the Grenadines between 1861 and 1880, excluding those who died during the voyage. By 1884, around 1,100 returned to India after completing their indenture period. The Indians that remained in Saint Vincent and the Grenadines are the origin of the Indo-Vincentian community.

=== Living conditions ===
Living conditions for Indian workers on the plantation estates were harsh. Many Indians died within a year of arriving in Saint Vincent. Although plantation owners were required to maintain detailed records of work done, and food and medical care provided, this was never done and most plantation owners only kept partial records, if any. There were no medical facilities for Indian workers. A large number of Indians died as a result of bowel diseases such as yaws and worm infections. Others died from ulcers that were not treated and did not heal. British Colonial Office records from 1879 mention that many Indians who contracted yaws were expelled from the estates and left to die. Plantation owners generally lacked empathy for and mistreated indentured workers, a legacy of slavery. Plantations owners also complained that Indians did less work than Creoles, and illegally lowered their wages in violation of the contract terms. For instance, the owner of the Rutland Vale Estate claimed that Indians did only half work assigned to them and cut their wages in half. Similar practices occurred on other estates in Saint Vincent. Plantation owners who paid monthly wages often made illegal deductions to wages paid out to workers. Most estate owners provided poor housing conditions for workers and their families. Owners also manipulated workers' contracts to deny them their right of free passage to India.

Indian workers complained that they had been deceived about the nature of work in Saint Vincent, and that the wages they received were less than those paid to indentured workers on other Caribbean islands. However, Indians had limited avenues for redress as they were barred from leaving the estates and therefore could not visit a magistrate's office. The only colonial administration official they came into contact with, the Immigration Agent, was also apathetic to their plight. For instance, following an inspection of an estate that employed Indian workers, Immigration Agent E. Musson described the worker's diet as "garbage" because they were vegetarians, and also described them as having "great filthiness of habit" which he held responsible for the low quality of their housing. Immigration Agents routinely ignored the rapidly deteriorating conditions of workers' housing in estates across the island.

Female Indian workers suffered additional hardships. Plantation owners did not provide any child care options for women with children. If women took time off from work to attend to their children, owners deducted their wages. As a result, women typically earned less than the men and were more malnourished and more likely to fall ill. They were also in danger of being sexually exploited and were offered little protection by the colonial administration who viewed the women as "immoral". Lieutenant-Governor Rennie wrote that female Indian migrants came from a class which was "not very rigid in their morality". Despite there being twice as many male Indian workers on an estate as females, Rennie wrote that the women "are quite sufficient for the men they accompany" because of their class and could be "expected to provide at least two men with sexual relations". In 1870, a female Indian indentured worker on the Agyll Estate named Saberchanney was reportedly held down by several men and flogged on her back 18 times by English overseer Samuel Parsons. This was reportedly a punishment for refusing to have sex with another Indian worker. Saberchanney did not report the incident, but it came to light after a carpenter witnessed the flogging and complained to Lieutenant-Governor Berkeley. Parsons was later prosecuted for his actions.

Following repeated complaints of maltreatment, Governor Robinson appointed R.P. Cropper, the St. Lucia Protector of Indians, to investigate the conditions of Indian indentured labourers in Saint Vincent. Cropper's report found that poverty and disease were widespread among the workers, yaws were common, and many workers were abnormally thin and malnourished. Cropper stated that living and working conditions failed to meet the requirements set by the Immigration Act. He found that most worker housing was unfit for living and required urgent repairs or had to be demolished and rebuilt entirely. Despite the damning report, conditions for workers worsened in the subsequent years.

=== Protests ===
Indentured workers who attempted to complain about their living and working conditions were often prosecuted and imprisoned or sentenced to hard labour, as the terms of their contracts barred them from leaving their assigned estates. Magistrates in Saint Vincentian courts were often biased towards plantation owners, as they belonged to the same social class. A group of Indian male labourers protested by marching to Kingstown from their estate in 1861. This was the first known instance of an organized protest by indentured workers in Saint Vincent. The workers demanded that their work load be reduced. However, authorities arrested their leader. He was convicted of breach of contract and sentenced to 20 days of hard labour. A group led by George Gordon (who may have been a Creole) and including 7 Indian indentured workers went on strike at the Cane Grove Estate in 1873. All of them were convicted of breaching their contract.

The next protest by Indian indentured workers occurred nearly a decade later on 7 October 1882. A group of 30-50 Indian male workers marched from the Argyll and Calder estates into Kingstown, attempting to present their concerns directly to Lieutenant-Governor Gore. Their primary concerns were their living and working conditions, and denial of their right of return to India. As with previous protests, magistrates ordered the arrest of the workers and convicted them for breaching their contracts by leaving their assigned estates. The leaders of the groups were also fined US$5 (equivalent to $167 in 2025) each.

Despite the failure of the workers to reach Lieutenant-Governor Gore, the 1882 protest would achieve some success afterward. A group of 7 Indian workers from the Argyll Estate who had been convicted for breach of contract managed to file a petition with the Colonial Office, with the assistance of a barrister named George Smith. The petition was successful, and the 7 workers successfully won their right of return to India. The group was popularly known as the "Argyle Seven". Their case also revealed that plantation owners had failed to keep detailed records as required by law. This led to the Colonial Office declaring that Indian workers that had no work or housing in Saint Vincent and the Grenadines should be granted the right to return to India. Nearly 1,000 Indians were able to return to India because of this declaration.

A much more common and subtle form of protest was also employed by Indian workers, referred to by Immigration Agents as "skulking" or "idleness". For instance, colonial records from November 1861, show that only 111 of the 258 Indian indentured workers residing on 11 estates in the country were working. Twenty-four of the workers who were not working were recorded as "skulking", and another 14 had absconded from the estate. Colonial records for 1871 show that Indian workers worked only 93,354 out the 154,774 days that they were scheduled to work, with nearly 15% of Indian workers recorded as "skulking". Plantation owners attempted to curb "skulking" by flogging workers, however, records show that the practice continued regardless and many estate owners were unable to enforce a full work week.

Violent protests by Indian indentured workers was rare, however, there are some recorded instances of arson and physical assault committed by Indian indentured workers.

=== End of indenture ===
By 1875, nearly 30% of the Indians who arrived in Saint Vincent since 1861 had emigrated to other Caribbean countries, particularly Trinidad. However, the colonial government wanted Indians to remain in Saint Vincent, and in 1879, an Act of Parliament was enacted to bar ships from transporting Indians out of Saint Vincent. Saint Vincent was unable to import any more Indian indentured workers after 1880, as the Government did not have sufficient funds. The severe decline in the price of sugar in 1882 made the venture even more uneconomical.

By 1884, around 1,100 people returned to India after completing their indenture period. The ship transporting Indian indentured workers back to India departed from Kingstown on 1 August 1885. The harbour was lined with armed officers and military who sought to prevent Indians that were still indentured or those that had forfeited their right of return in exchange for a one-time payment of GBP10 from leaving.

By the beginning of the 20th century, there were around 500 Indians in Saint Vincent and the Grenadines, mostly residing in the estates surrounding the La Soufrière volcano, on Lot 14, Tourama, Waterloo, and Orange Hill. Two natural disasters near the turn of the century had a significant impact on the Indian population. Many Indians were killed by the 1898 Windward Islands hurricane and the eruption of La Soufrière in 1902. The natural disasters also heavily damaged the sugar industry. The Government disbanded the estate system and introduced a new land settlement scheme that permitted Indians to purchase property in other parts of the island. Most of the Indo-Vincentian community left the estates and moved near Kingstown, settling at areas such as Calder, Akers, Argyle, Richland Park, Park Hill, Georgetown and Rose Bank. Others chose to emigrate to Trinidad and Tobago and Guyana which had larger Indian communities, higher wages and legal rights for Indians. The indenture system was abolished in the Caribbean in the 1920s.

== Assimilation and post-indenture life ==
The Indians that remained in the country have assimilated with the local population and do not retain aspects of Indian culture or language. This is a common phenomenon among Indo-Caribbeans in nations with small Indian populations. Indo-Caribbeans in countries with larger populations such as Trinidad, Guyana and Suriname maintain Indian cultural and religious practices even today. Indo-Vincentian historian Arnold Thomas attributes the loss of Indian heritage to conversion by Christian churches, lack of an Indian school or temple, lack of ties with India, and change in cuisine.

Christian churches were active in converting Indians and baptising Indian infants. Within a year of the first Indians arriving in Saint Vincent, churches had converted many of the indentured workers and new-born children of workers were baptised and given Anglo-Saxon names after the plantation owners or the overseers. The Anglican and Wesleyan churches competed with each other for followers, and often re-baptised an Indian who had been baptised by the other church. Although immigration laws permitted Indian workers to practice any faith, much like the rest of the West Indies, colonial authorities generally encouraged churches to convert workers. Further, unlike Trinidad and Tobago, Guyana and Suriname, no temples or mosques were established for Indians in Saint Vincent. Another issue was the difficulty Indians in Saint Vincent had to maintain ties with their homeland. Letters took several months to send and receive, and were often not sent or delivered by colonial authorities or plantation owners. They also spread propaganda about poor conditions in India such as outbreaks of famines and disease. Although a school was established for Indian children at the Argylle Estate, it closed within a year. The lack of an Indian school accelerated the loss of Indian languages. Indian workers in Saint Vincent were also forced to alter their cuisine and switch to Creole cuisine, as they were unable to obtain ingredients to prepare Indian food.

Relations between Indians and Creoles were strained from the arrival of the first Indian indentured workers in the country. Creole workers resented the fact that Indian workers received higher wages. In the early 1860s, Immigration Agent E. Musson noted that the Indian community was "unaware of the jealousy that local labourers felt towards them." Following protests by Indian workers in 1862, Creole workers blamed them for rising poverty and unemployment in the country. They also chased some Indian workers off estates through intimidation and threats.

== Emigration ==
The Indo-Vincentian population reached an estimated 5,000-10,000 by the 1950s. However, a combination of societal discrimination and a lack of economic opportunities in the country led to most of the community emigrating to the United Kingdom, Canada, the United States, and other nations. According to historian Richard B. Cheddie, "Faced with economic, cultural intolerance, and the mother nature's wrath, they [Indians] had to depend on each other more. (Also, the missionaries were actively working on converting them to Christianity which is why most bear European surnames today.) The Indians there face still some overt and subtly forms of racism and are sometimes regarded as the lowest class citizens. Over time many moved off the island to seek greener pasture." Today, a sizeable Indo-Vincentian community is found in the High Wycombe Urban Area of Buckinghamshire in England, New York City and Miami in the United States, the Saint Croix, U.S. Virgin Islands, as well as parts of Canada.

== Present day ==
According to a 2016 estimate, Indo-Vincentians made up 6% of the country's population and were the third largest ethnic group in country, after Africans (66%) and people of mixed race (19%). As a result of interracial marriages, it is estimated that around 15% of the total population of Saint Vincent and the Grenadines is at least partially of Indian descent. The Saint Vincent and Grenadines Indian Heritage Foundation, established in October 2006, is the most prominent organization representing the Indo-Vincentian community. Some Sindhi Hindus have also immigrated to open businesses.

The Parliament of Saint Vincent and the Grenadines enacted an Act of Parliament on 26 March 2007 officially declaring 1 June as Indian Arrival Day. The first official commemoration of the event was held on 1 June that year. The day is marked annually by a re-enactment of the landing of Indians at Indian Bay, Kingstown, followed by a procession to Heritage Square. Several Indian cultural events are also held to mark the occasion. The first International Indian Diaspora Conference was held for the first time on 1–3 June 2012. It was organized by the St. Vincent and the Grenadines Chapter of the Global Organization of People of Indian Origin International (GOPIO-SVG), in partnership with the SVG Indian Heritage Foundation, and under the patronage of the SVG Ministry of Tourism and Culture. This was the first international conference for the Indian diaspora held in the country. Similar conferences had been held in other Caribbean nations since 1975.

The Government of the Saint Vincent and the Grenadines officially designated 7 October as Indian Heritage Day.

== Culture ==
Most of the Indo-Vincentian community no longer speak Indian languages. However, some Indian words, particularly those relating to food such as roti (bread), channa (chick pea), and karela (bitter gourd) have influenced the Vincentian English language and are still used today. The term dougla used to refer to persons of mixed African and Asian race is of Hindi origin. Indian food such as curry, roti, rice and daal are commonly consumed as part of Vincentian cuisine.

== See also ==
- India–Saint Vincent and the Grenadines relations
- Indo-Caribbean
- Hinduism in the West Indies
- Islam in Saint Vincent and the Grenadines
