= Second Carib War =

Conflict on the island of Saint Vincent (1795–1797)

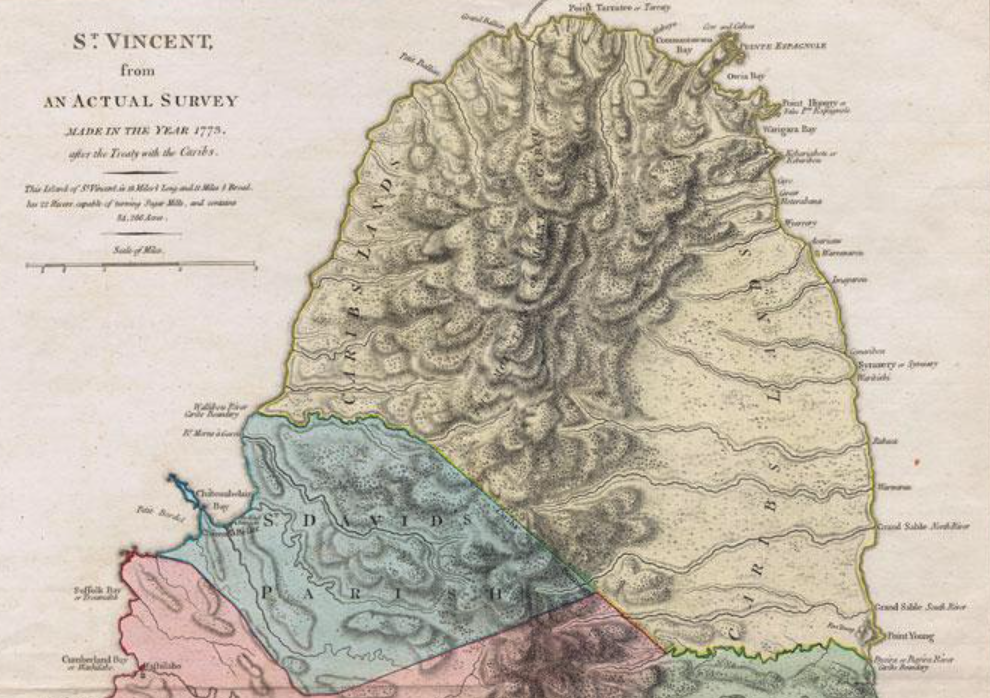
Map of Saint Vincent following the First Carib War

The Second Carib War took place on the island of Saint Vincent between 1795 and 1797. The indigenous population of the island were supported by French forces against the British. Joseph Chatoyer initially led the Caribs, but was killed during a battle on 14 March 1795.

== Background ==
The term Carib was created by the Spanish to describe the indigenous inhabitants of the islands that fought against the Spanish while indigenous people who were friendly to the Spanish were labeled as Arawak.

The British took control over Saint Vincent in 1763 as part of the Treaty of Paris ending the Seven Years' War. The Caribs supported the French invasion in 1779, but the British regained control over the island in 1783.

Native resistance existed against the Spanish, French, and British. The First Carib War broke out in response to settlement commissioners trying to survey the eastern half of the island, which was the core of the Caribs' land. The war lasted from 1772 to 1773. The British defeated the Caribs, who lost 2,000 acres of land and were forced to accept subjection to British authority.

== War ==
On 9 March 1795, an uprising by Caribs started and they destroyed multiple sugar plantations. Joseph Chatoyer issued a proclamation on 12 March calling for the French inhabitants of the island to join the uprising. The uprising was supported by the 4,000 French settlers and slaves on the island and French forces from Guadeloupe.

Victor Hugues, a member of the Jacobins and governor of Guadeloupe, used Guadeloupe as a base of attack against the British in the Caribbean. He supports revolts in Saint Vincent, Grenada, and St. Lucia. The French soldiers sent to fight in Saint Vincent included free people of color, former slaves, and white people.

Chatoyer marched his army to join his brother at Dorsetshire Hill, which overlooked the capital Kingstown. On 14 March, three British prisoners were hacked to death by Chatoyer using a sabre that was given to him by Sir William Young, 1st Baronet, of North Dean to mark the peace treaty ending the First Carib War. However, a group of British seamen, soldiers, and slaves launched a surprise attack that night and killed Chatoyer. Chatoyer was succeeded in leadership by his son.

French forces on the island agreed to surrender in June 1796. Around 2,800 French prisoners of war were transported across the Atlantic and arrived in Portsmouth in October. During the voyage 218 people died and the remainder were 2,080 non-white soldiers, 313 white soldiers, and 99 women and children.

The British deported 4,195 Caribs to the nearby island of Baliceaux in 1796, and around half of the population died due to famine and disease. The remaining 2,248 Caribs of Baliceaux were deported to Roatán, an island off the coast of Honduras, in 1797. Roatán was garrisoned by the Spanish, but the island was taken by the British without firing a shot. These actions were referred to as ethnic cleansing and genocide, including by historian Hilary Beckles. An act removing the Carbis' legal rights to their lands was passed in June 1804, and their land was sold to white planters.

== Works cited ==
=== Books ===
- Alston, David (2021). Slaves and Highlanders: Silenced Histories of Scotland and the Caribbean. Edinburgh University Press. ISBN 9781474427302.

=== Journals ===
- Bateman, Rebecca (1990). "Africans and Indians: A Comparative Study of the Black Carib and Black Seminole". Ethnohistory. 37 (1). Duke University Press: 1–24. doi:10.2307/481934. JSTOR 481934.
- Kim, Julie (2013). "The Caribs of St. Vincent and Indigenous Resistance during the Age of Revolutions". Early American Studies. 11 (1). University of Pennsylvania Press: 117–132. doi:10.2307/23546705. JSTOR 23546705.
- Kim, Julie (2014). "Natural Histories of Indigenous Resistance: Alexander Anderson and the Caribs of St. Vincent". The Eighteenth Century: Theory and Interpretation. 55 (2/3). University of Pennsylvania Press: 217–233. doi:10.2307/44729983. JSTOR 44729983.
