= Wallilabou River =

River in Saint Vincent and the Grenadines

Coordinates: 13°15′56″N 61°15′32″W

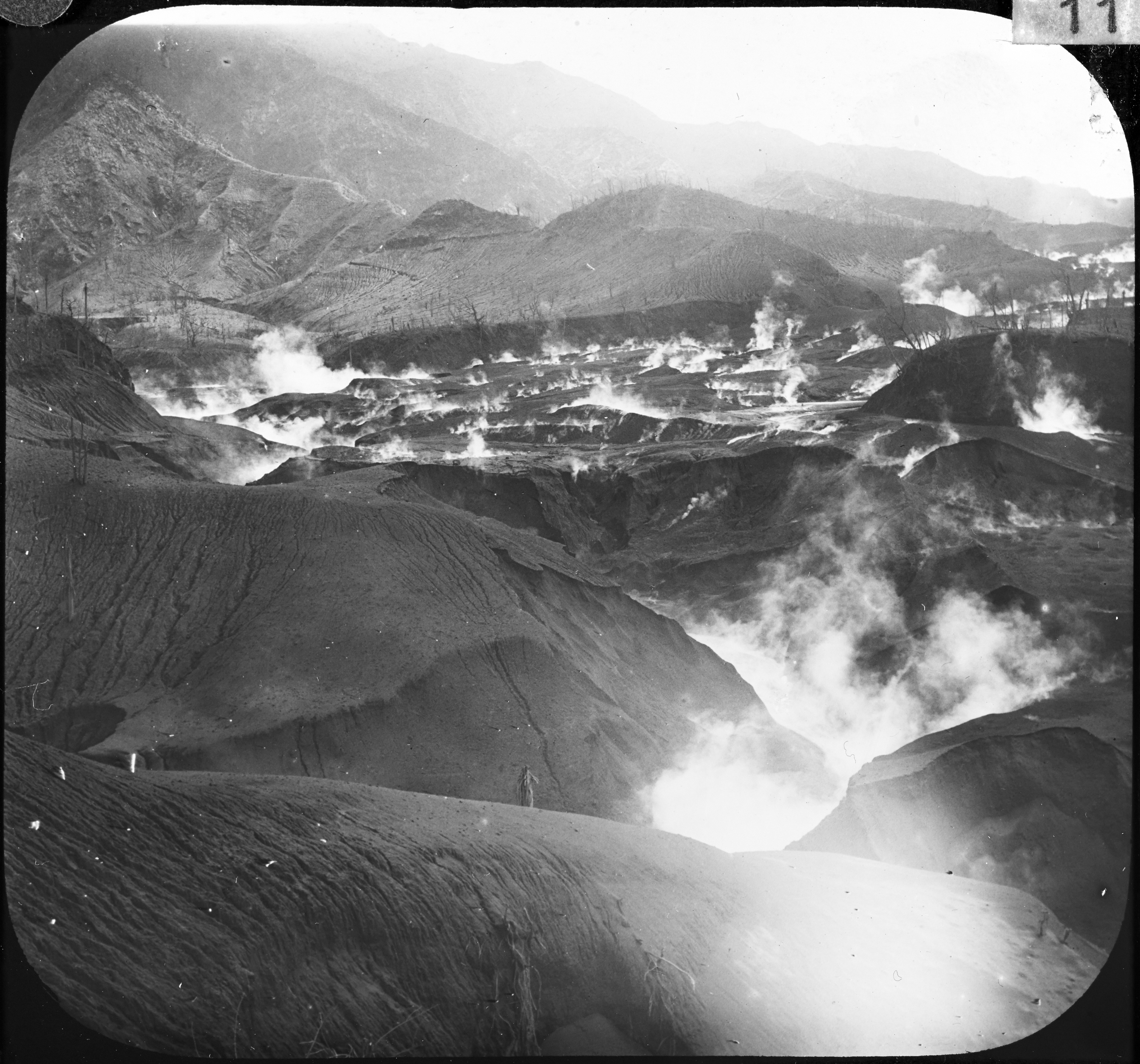
View of river with craters in background. Craters are the result of interaction of the river water or ground water with hot ash. The hot ash is the deposit of nuée ardentes. 30 May 1902.

The Wallilabou River is a river in the northwest of Saint Vincent. It rises in the Grand Bonhomme Mountains in the centre of the island and flows northwest to reach the Caribbean Sea north of Barrouallie. Wallilabou Falls-a tourist attraction-is located on this river, a short walk Northeast along the Leeward Highway.

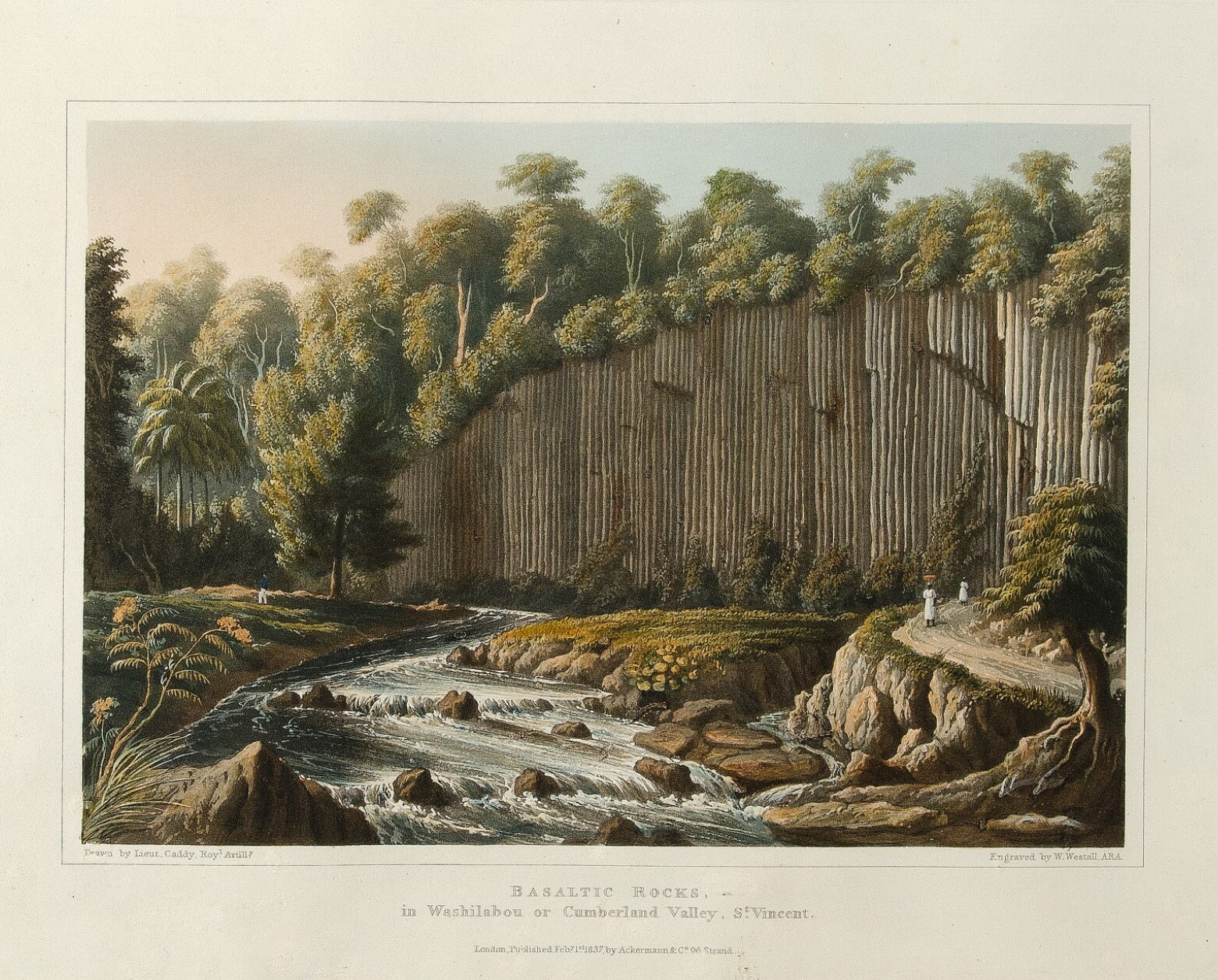
Basaltic Rocks in Wallilabou or Cumberland Valley, St. Vincent. Painted ca. 1836
