= First Carib War =

British Colonial War

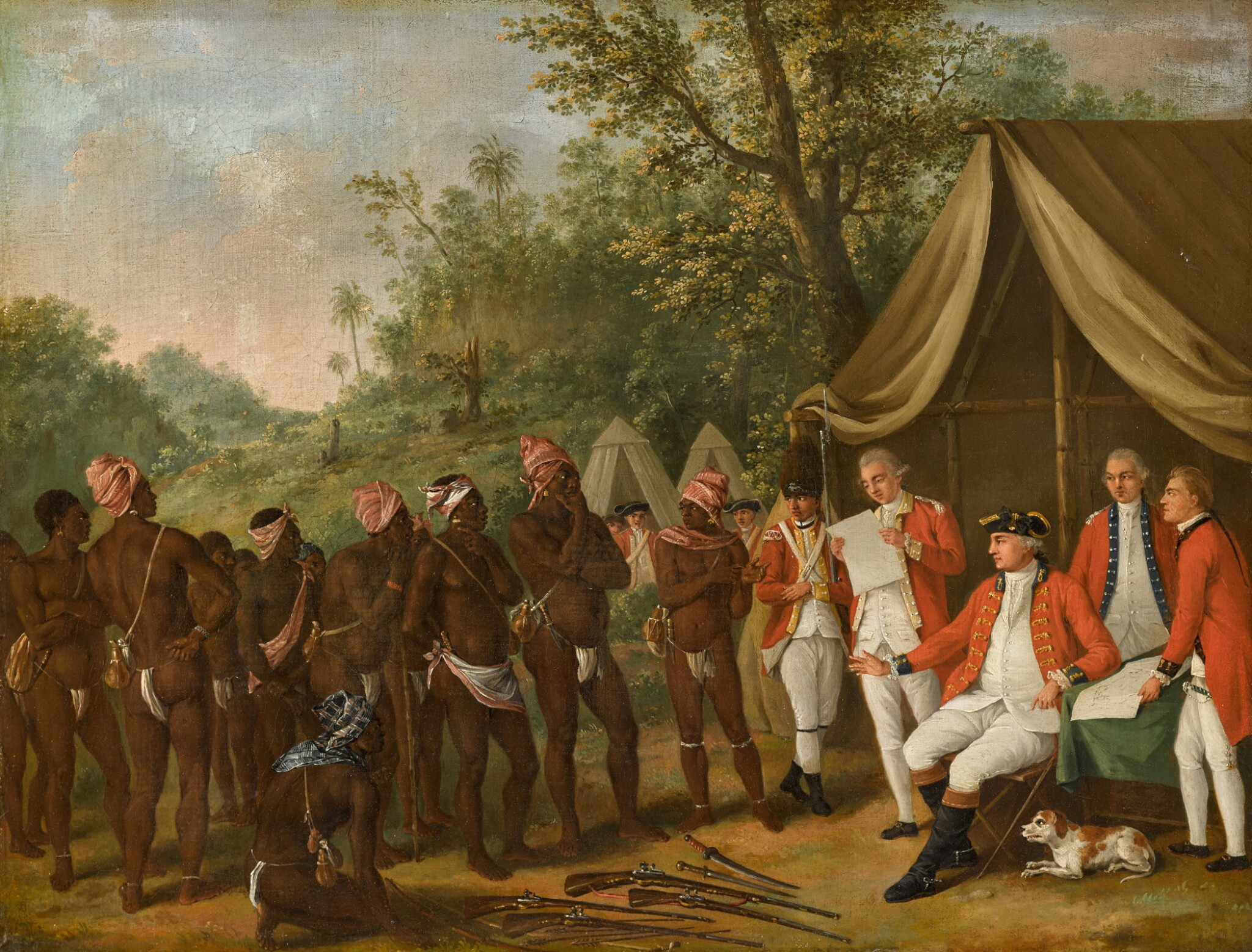
- Depiction of treaty negotiations between Black Caribs and British authorities on the Caribbean island of Saint Vincent in 1773
Date	1769–1773
Location	Saint Vincent

Belligerents
Garifuna; Supported by: France	Great Britain

Commanders and leaders
Joseph Chatoyer	Governor Robert Melvill; Governor William Leyborne Leyborne; Admiral Robert Mann; Major-General William Dalrymple

Units involved
1,500–3,000 men	6th Regiment of Foot; 14th Regiment of Foot; 31st Regiment of Foot; 32nd Regiment of Foot; 68th Regiment of Foot; 70th Regiment of Foot; St. Vincent Militia

Casualties and losses
Unknown	72-150 Killed in Action, 80 Wounded, 110 dead from disease

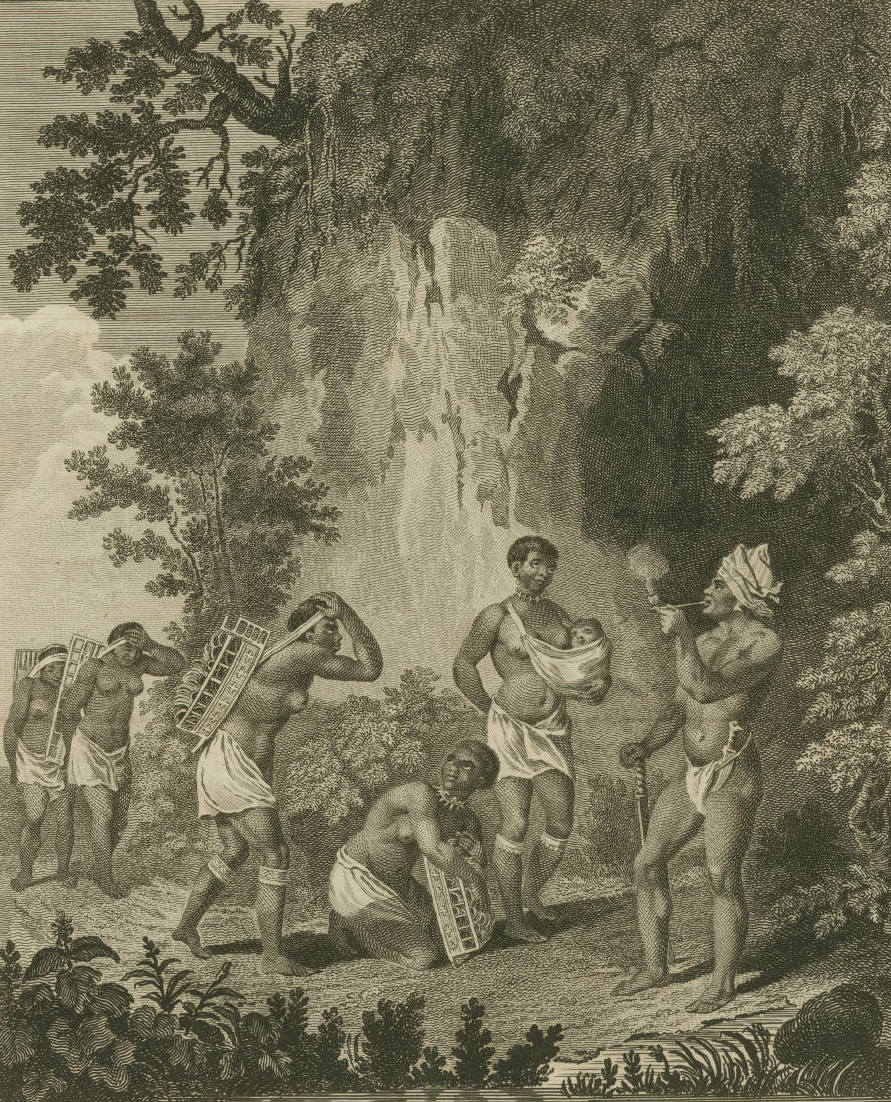
Joseph Chatoyer, the chief of the Black Caribs in Saint Vincent, in an 1801 engraving

The First Carib War (1769–1773) was a military conflict between the Kalinago inhabitants of Saint Vincent and British military forces supporting British efforts at colonial expansion on the island.

== Background ==
St. Vincent was subject to multiple colonisation attempts by Britain and France throughout the early 18th century, with efforts primarily focused on establishing plantation settlements. Along with Dominica and Tobago, St. Vincent was ceded to Britain in the Treaty of Paris (1763) and placed under the joint-authority of Governor Robert Melvill. Under Melvill and his successor, William Leyborne Leyborne, the islands saw considerable advancement in their economies, and land acquisition became a driving force in island policy, putting them at odds with their respective native populations.

== Conflict ==
=== Initial stage ===
Relations between the British and Garifuna broke down in 1769 when a survey party supported by the 32nd Regiment was taken hostage, having crossed into Garifuna land to construct roads. Concerned that further encroachment could lead to an invasion, Garifuna leaders under Joseph Chatoyer made contact with the French government in Martinique, where they negotiated the sale of weapons. In September of that year the crew of an American ship were massacred when it went aground. Supplied with firearms from the nearby French islands, the Garifunas in particular became a problem for British colonial ambitions in the region, and in November 1770 three infantry regiments were shipped out from Cork to the West Indies to protect planters in Dominica, St. Vincent and Tobago. In late 1771 a letter was intercepted by Sir William Young confirming ties between the Garifunas and the Governor of Martinique.

=== British offensive ===
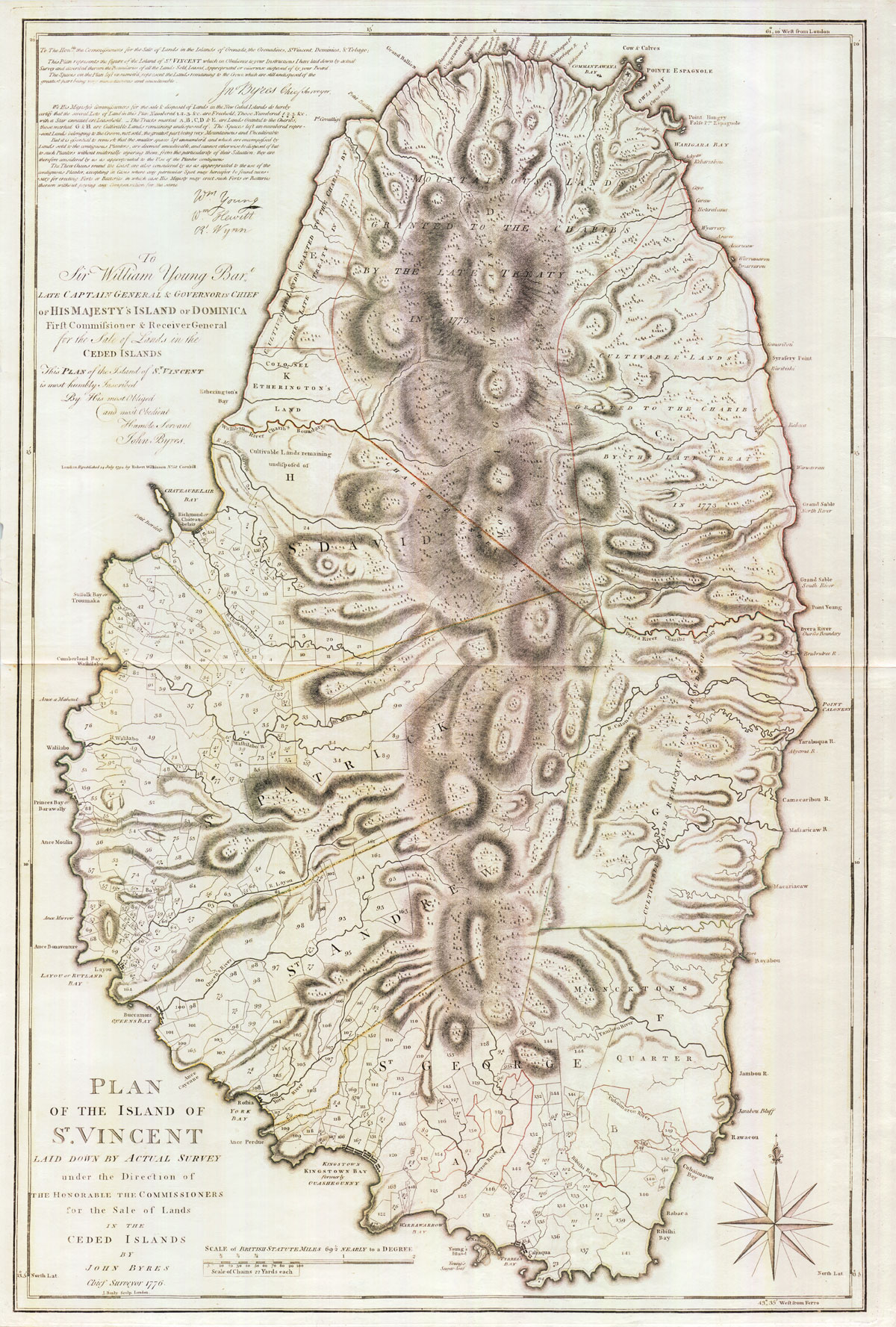
A 1776 map of the Caribbean isle of Saint Vincent. The southern portion of the island was under British control, and the northern portion was under the control of the Black Caribs.

Frustrated by the deadlock, in 1772 Governor William Leyborne Leyborne requested aid from Britain, and was answered by the colonial secretary, Wills Hill, 1st Marquess of Downshire. Despite concerns of the approaching hurricane season being raised by the secretary for war, William Barrington, 2nd Viscount Barrington, plans were drawn to rapidly re-deploy several regiments to the island with the intention of swiftly crushing resistance.

As the Summer approached, the garrison on St. Vincent was bolstered by additional companies of the 32nd, 68th and 70th Regiments, being redeployed from Dominica, Antigua and Grenada, respectively. Additionally, the 6th and 14th Regiments were deployed from the Province of Massachusetts under orders from General Thomas Gage. Admiral Robert Mann was tasked with leading a Royal Navy squadron to the island to cut off any communication with Martinique.

Under orders from Major-General William Dalrymple, the invasion began in September, with the main force pushing north from Kingstown and supported by additional beach landings further up the coast, including at Grand Sable Bay, now Georgetown. The main priority of the invasion was capturing the mountains in the centre of the island.

In January 1773 a party of the 31st Regiment of Foot led by Ralph Walsh was ambushed and killed by Garifunas, becoming the highest-ranked loss of the war.

Despite their large numbers, disease and the hot and wet weather on the island led to many soldiers dying shortly after arrival, with half of the 14th Regiment's contribution having died before any fighting occurred. By the end of the hurricane season, much of the island's food stores were spent, and the expeditionary force was dependent on American food shipments. The roughly 1500-3000 Garifuna fighters lasted out the invasion through ambushes and attacks on plantations to starve out the expeditionary force.

== Cessation of hostilities ==
The war was unpopular in Britain, with multiple debates in the House of Commons critical of the North ministry's handling of the situation. Richard Whitworth, Thomas Townshend and Isaac Barré each questioned the need for war, seeing it as British encroaching in recognised foreign territory, and a waste of men who had more important duties elsewhere. With military matters reaching a stalemate, a peace agreement was signed in 1773 that delineated boundaries between British and Kalinago areas of the island. The Kalinago were to have the northern third of the island from the Wallilabou River in the west to the Byera River in the east.

== See also ==
- Second Carib War
