= Vincentian Creole =

English-based creole of Saint Vincent and the Grenadines

- Native to: Saint Vincent and the Grenadines
- Native speakers: 108,000 (2016)
- Language family: English creole: Atlantic; Eastern; Vincentian Creole

Language codes
- ISO 639-3: svc
- Glottolog: vinc1243 Vincentian Creole English

Vincentian Creole is an English-based creole language spoken in Saint Vincent and the Grenadines. It contains elements of Spanish, Antillean Creole, and various Iberian Romance languages. It has also been influenced by the indigenous Kalinago/Garifuna elements and by African languages brought over the Atlantic Ocean by way of the slave trade. Over the years the creole has changed to be a mix of all of those languages.

== Pronunciation ==
- Hard sounds at the end of words are avoided. There are mainly two ways hard sounds are evaded:
  - by changing the order of the sounds. Example: "ask" is rendered as "aks"
  - by dropping the last sound. Example: "desk" pronounced as "dess" and "tourist" as "touriss"
- For words ending in "-er", the "-er" sound changes to an "ah" sound. Example: "never" is pronounced as "nevah" and clever as "clevah"
- For words ending in "-th", the soft "-th" sound is replaced by the hard "t" sound as if the "h" were dropped. Example: "with" is rendered as "wit" and "earth" as "eart"
- For words ending in "-own", the "-own" is rendered as "-ung". Examples: down is rendered "dung" and town is rendered "tung"
- Words beginning with "dr" change to " j". Examples: driver is rendered 'jiver' and "drop off" as "jop off"

== Grammar ==
Generally, there is no need for concord. The verb in its plural form is simply placed after the subject of the sentence. The object of the sentence is then placed after the verb, as in English. If there are both a direct object and an indirect object, the indirect object is placed directly after the verb followed by the direct object.

The subject pronouns are as shown in the following table.

Pronouns	Origin	English equivalent
me	me (English)	I or me
yo	you (English)	you (singular, as both object and subject)
e/i (pronounced "ee")	he (English)	he/she/it
ahwe	all of we (incorrect grammatically, English)	we or us
aryo/alyo	all of you (English)	you (plural, as both object and subject)
dem/demdey	them/them there (English)	they or them

With regards to tense, the present tense is indicated by the use of the modal "does" (for habitual actions) or by the use of the present participle ending in "-ing" (for actions one is currently doing). The past tense is indicated by the use of either what is in English the plural form of the present tense of the verb, the modal "did", "been"/"bin" or the past participle of the verb. The future tense is indicated by the use of the present participle of the verb "to go", which is "going" (gine or gwine in the creole), or the plural form of the verb, "go".

Tense	Example
Present	Me does give / Me givin'
Past	Me give / Me did give / Me bin give
Future	Me gine give/ Me gwine give / Me go give

== Vocabulary ==
Expression	Origin	Meaning
maanin	morning (English)	Good Morning!/morning
mek?	what made ____ (what caused _____) ?	why?
naygah	equivalent to negro (English)	people
pikney	pequenino (Portuguese)	child
buh	but (English)	but
caah	cause 'because' (English)	because or cannot
parisohl	parasol (Spanish)	umbrella
dohtish/chupit	doltish (English)	stupid
paa/weypaa	where (English)	where or what
nyam	nyam (Wolof/Fula)	eat
comess	konmès (Antillean Creole)	gossip
yah/yahso	here (English)	here
dey/deyso	there (English)	there
outadoh/out dey	outdoors (English)	outside
pyar pyar	Unknown	poor
chook	jukka (Fula)	poke
huunch	Hit	to elbow or hit someone
Annuh	old southern Caribbean folklore	Expression similar to "you know"
Aryo	From the English term “all of you”.	Pronoun addressing listener
Arwe	From English "all of we"	Pronoun referring to speaker and other individuals
Babylon	From Rastafarian culture comparing modern issues to the ancient city of Babylon	The police, or an unjust system or establishment.
Bad-eye	A look of contempt.	Possibly from English "evil eye"
Cyar	From English "can't"	To be unable to do something
Foh	From English "for"	Same meaning and usage as English "for"
Gwine	From English "going"	Act of departure, progress or advancement
Tark	From English "talk"	To converse using spoken words
Pree	Jamaican Creole	To be overly curious in other people's affairs

== Expressions and Sayings ==
Expression	Meaning
Back ah yard	Back home
Bad feelings	Feeling ill or uncomfortable
Bad talk	Speak about somebody negativity
Behin God's back	A remote or rural area
Bless up	Salutations (usually a closing mark in conversation)
Dat nuff	That's enough
Dat nuh business me	That's not my business/problem
Dor ramp wid me	Don't harass me
I dor kno the guy/lady from Adam	I don't know this man/woman
Little jackass ha big ears	Be careful what you say and where
Look sharp	Hurry up
Me name stink ah road	I have a negative reputation
Mudda wuk	Oh my goodness
Nah badda meh	Do not bother me
Pop down	In a poor or bad state
Seen	I understand
Shout me later nah	Talk to me at a later time
Shell down	To do exceptionally well at something
Since me born/Since 1802/Since Soufriere erupt	Since a long time ago
Stick break in yuh ears	Unwilling to listen to advice
Wah ah gwarn	What's going on
Walk good	Take care

== See also ==
- Antiguan Creole
- Belizean Creole
- Jamaican Patois
- Bajan Creole
- Bermudian English
- Trinidadian Creole
- Antillean Creole
