= Garifuna in Peril =

- Film poster
- Spanish: Garífuna en Peligro
- Directed by: Alí Allié; Rubén Reyes
- Written by: Alí Allié; Rubén Reyes; William Flores
- Produced by: Alí Allié; Rubén Reyes
- Starring: Rubén Reyes; Julián Castillo; Gloria Garnett; Etsil Arnold; Belice E.J. Mejía Jr.; Yessica Álvarez; Luisito Martínez; Arleny Escobar; Aubrey Wakeling; Bill Flores; Araceli Núñez
- Cinematography: Alí Allié
- Release dates: November 25, 2012 (London, England)
- Running time: 99 minutes
- Countries: United States; Honduras
- Languages: Garifuna; English; Spanish

Garifuna in Peril is a low-budget independent fiction docufiction feature film directed, written, and produced by Alí Allié and Rubén Reyes. The film depicts historical and contemporary issues within the Garinagu (plural of Garifuna) Afro-Honduran indigenous community and features a cast of actors from Honduras and Belize.

The film was shot in Garifuna, English and Spanish, and is notable for being one of the first, if only, contemporary feature films shot in the Garifuna language. The Garifuna language and culture depicted in the film is also noteworthy as it was proclaimed by UNESCO in 2001 as a Masterpieces of the Oral and Intangible Heritage of Humanity, under threat of extinction as at that time there was almost no surviving record of the language and it was not formally taught outside of the countries of Honduras and Belize. The language and this film features music that is an oral tradition of storytelling of song and dance that is a unique blend of African and Amerindian cultures that are often quite satirical in nature.

== Plot ==
The movie follows the journey of a Garifuna language teacher Ricardo, played by co-director Rubén Reyes, in Los Angeles as he struggles to be a good father, husband, and brother while taking responsibility to preserve his native language, traditional culture and community lands against the expansion of tourism. Ricardo's plans to build a Garifuna language school on the north coast of Honduras become complicated by the expansion plans of a tourist resort in the area. Personal betrayal pushes him to travel to Honduras and directly confront land issues in tandem with his educational mission.

Meanwhile, Ricardo's son Elijah, played by E.J. Mejia Jr., rehearses a theater play dramatizing an episode from the life of Garifuna Paramount Chief Joseph Chatoyer / Satuyé and his last stand against the British on the island of St. Vincent, the same historical events dramatized in William A. Brown's now-lost play The Drama of King Shotaway, a play that is credited as being the first Black play in the United States. Ricardo's daughter Helena, a teenager also must deal with her parents' disapproval of her relations with a man considerably older than her.

== Cast ==
- Rubén Reyes as Ricardo, a Garifuna language teacher who lives in Los Angeles
- Julián Castillo as Miguel, Ricardo's brother who has business dealings in Honduras, where the brothers are trying to build a school to teach Garifuna
- Gloria Garnett as Becky, Ricardo's wife
- Etsil Arnold as Jimmy
- E.J. Mejía Jr. as Elijah / Elías, Ricardo's son who portrays Garifuna Paramount Chief Joseph Satuye, also known as Joseph Chatoyer, in the play-within-the-play featured in the film
- Yessica Álvarez as Helena, Becky and Ricardo's daughter, who is dating Gabriel
- Luisito Martínez as Gabriel, Helena's boyfriend, of whom her parents do not approve
- Arleny Escobar as Vera
- Aubrey Wakeling as Richard
- Bill Flores as Hillbuck, who writes the play-within-the-play, Garinagu in Peril, that is featured in the film
- Araceli Núñez as Yanisi
- Saira Amaya as Wendy

== Production and development ==
Originally part of a trilogy called the Garifuna Film Trilogy, the film was shot in Los Angeles, California, and Triunfo de la Cruz, Honduras after being in development for over 10 years. The project began after Alí Allié and Rubén Reyes met at the 1999 Pan-African Film Festival in Los Angeles.

Co-director, co-writer, co-producer, and cinematographer Alí Allié is an American filmmaker who is known for his work directing the 1999 independent film, Spirit of My Mother (El Espíritu de mi Mamá), a Spanish-language film distributed by Vanguard Cinema about a Garifuna woman from Honduras. Co-director, co-writer, co-producer, and actor Rubén Reyes is a linguist and expert on the history and culture of the Garifuna people, who created the world's first tri-lingual dictionary of Garifuna, Garudia: Garifuna Trilingual Dictionary (Garifuna-English-Spanish). Bill Flores, a co-writer of the film, wrote the initial play of the same name upon which the film was based and is a member of the Garifuna Writers Group that is based in Los Angeles. The traditional Garifuna dance was choreographed by Georgette Lambey.

The film had both a grassroots base of investors as well as 11 private investors, many from the Garifuna community in Los Angeles, with the Garifuna Coalition USA Inc in New York City providing assistance and guidance with publicity and marketing while the Garifuna American Heritage Foundation United (GAHFU) organization of Los Angeles helped outreach for casting of the film. All members of the cast and crew had jobs, so the film was scheduled around their jobs and was dependent upon funding streams.

As the filmmakers began to cast the film, they faced the realities of a language in decline. Co-director Alí Allié said that they were "shocked that there was almost no one under 18 years old who spoke the language, and that was something we were kind of in denial about. And that's when the film took on more urgency, and that's when we came up with the title, Garifuna in Peril." All of the cast members were of Garifuna descent from Honduras and Belize, with the film being their first time performing for the majority of the cast.

The film is unique in that it is one of the first narrative fictional films to tell the story of a little known ethnic group with Caribbean origins with the filmmakers attempting to use film to preserve and rescue what was a critically fast-fading culture. The film dramatizes and highlights the challenges indigenous people across the world face as they fight "to keep their lands against larger economic interests while struggling to preserve their culture amid globalization and migration."

== Critical reception ==
Response to the film was positive. Film critic Mark Bell of Film Threat noted that Garifuna in Peril has a "unique and distinct vibe". When writing about the strength of the film's characterizations, performances and film-making he explains that, "there's something matter-of-fact about the movie that makes it feel natural...the scenes play out as if they would in real life, if we were suddenly interrupting a moment." Journalist Steve Furay of the Michigan Citizen called Garifuna in Peril provocative.

Co-director Alí Allié described audience responses during screenings: "It's [Garifuna in Peril] related to indigenous cultures. At different screenings we've had people stand up and make comments. We've had a Native American woman stand up and say 'thank you for telling this story; this is my story.' Mayan women in Honduras said 'this is also our story.' It's specific to Garifuna in one sense, but these are the issues — the cultural loss, the economic problems and the land grab — really relevant to all indigenous peoples." According to co-director (and lead of the film) Rubén Reyes the film speaks to a matter that is timely, the Garifuna people, "are now facing imminent danger. We could eventually lose our land, our culture, our identity and just become simple workers."

== Awards ==
- 2013: Arizona International Film Festival – Best Narrative Feature
- 2013: Boston International Film Festival – Indie Spirit Special Recognition Award
- 2013: WorldFest Houston – Golden Remi for Docu-Drama
- 2013: Festival de Cinema Latino American di Trieste – Audience Choice

== Release and distribution ==
After the film's premier at the London Latin American Film Festival on November 25, 2012, the film was self-distributed, and was mostly shown at many international film festivals that had themes and focus on the African diaspora and Afro-Caribbean and Latin American culture, which highlighted the difficulty of distributing an independent film about Garifuna history. The film was further screened as part of a film tour of Central America focusing on villages and towns with Garifuna populations in Belize (as part of the Belize International Film Festival), Guatemala, and Honduras. It was also screened in universities in both the United States and Central America. An American on-demand theatrical distribution platform called TUGG was used to screen the film in select U.S. cities.

- London Latin American Film Festival in London, England (November 25, 2012)
- New York African Diaspora Film Festival in New York, New York (December 2 and 5, 2012)
- Santa Fe Film Festival (December 8, 2012) in Santa Fe, New Mexico
- African Diaspora International Film Festival in New York, New York (January 18, 2013)
- San Diego Black Film Festival in San Diego, California (February 3, 2013)
- Los Angeles Pan African Film Festival in Los Angeles, California (February 16, 2013)
- Arizona International Film Festival in Tucson, Arizona (April 13, 2013 and April 28, 2013)
- Athens International Film + Video Festival in Athens, Ohio (April 14, 2013)
- Chicago Latino Film Festival in Chicago, Illinois (April 14, 2013 and April 16, 2013)
- Festival International du Film Panafricain in Cannes, France (April 19, 2013)
- Langston Hughes African American Film Festival in Seattle, Washington (April 19, 2013)
- Boston International Film Festival in Boston, Massachusetts (April 20, 2013)
- Worldfest Houston (April 21, 2013)
- Berlin Black Cinema International in Berlin, Germany (May 11, 2013)
- Garifuna Film Festival International in Los Angeles, California (May 25 and 26, 2013)
- Zanzibar International Film Festival (July 4, 2013)
- Caribbean Tales Toronto Showcase in Toronto, Canada (September 11, 2013)
- Capital City Black Film Festival in Austin, Texas (September 27, 2013)
- Cine+Mas San Francisco Latino Film Festival in San Francisco, California (September 27, 2013)
- New England Festival of Ibero American Cinema in New England (October 3, 2013)
- Festival de Cine de Bogotá in Bogotá, Colombia (October 16, 2013 through October 24, 2013)
- Festival de Cinema Latino American di Trieste in Trieste, Italy (October 25, 2013)
- Englewood International Film Festival in Chicago, Illinois (October 26, 2013)
- Uptown Film Festival in Birmingham, Michigan (November 9, 2013)
- BronzeLens Film Festival in Atlanta, Georgia (November 9, 2013)
- Festival Cine//B in Santiago, Chile (November 28, 2013)
- Bahamas International Film Festival in Nassau, Bahamas (December 5, 2013 and December 6, 2013)
