= Afro-Guatemalans =

Afroguatemaltecos (Spanish)
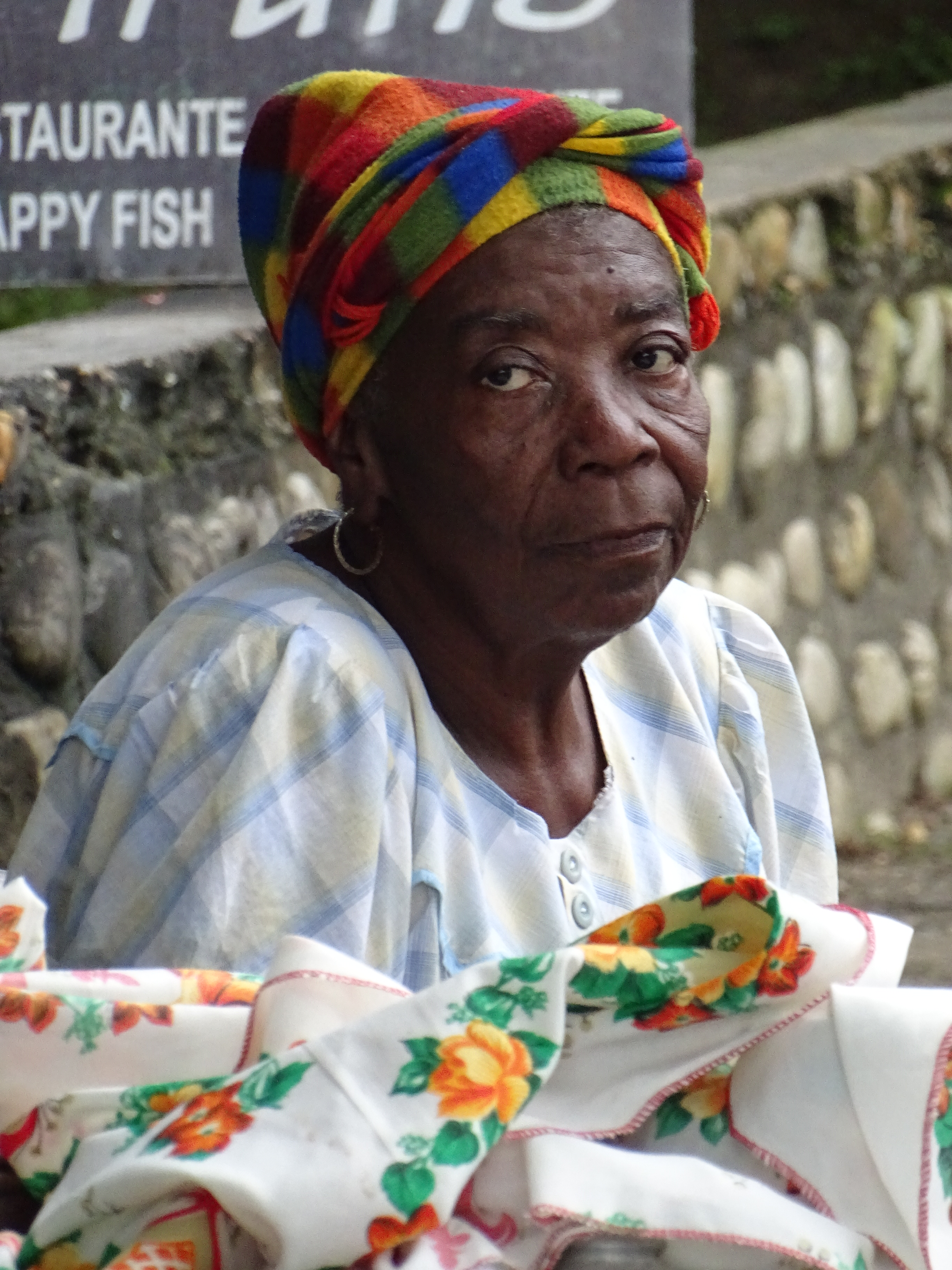
- Garífuna Vendor in Livingston, Guatemala.

Total population
- Sub-Saharan ancestry predominates Blacks: 28,312 (2018 census); 0.19% of the Guatemalan population Garifunas: 19,529 (2018 census); 0.13% of the Guatemalan population

Regions with significant populations
- Livingston (Garifuna settlement), Puerto Barrios and Santo Tomás

Languages
- Spanish • English • Garifuna

Religion
- Roman Catholicism • Protestantism • Afro-American religions

Related ethnic groups
- Afro-Latin Americans, Afro-Caribbean, Garifuna

Afro-Guatemalans (Spanish: Afroguatemaltecos) or Black Guatemalans (Spanish: Guatemaltecos negros) are Guatemalans of predominantly or total Black African ancestry. This term intertwines the conquest of America by the Spanish. The Afro-Guatemalan population is not numerous today. Although it is difficult to determine specific figures, it is reported that Afro-Guatemalans represent only between 0.1% and 0.3% of the country's population. According to the Council on Hemispheric Affairs. They are of mainly English-speaking West Indian (Antillean) and Garifuna origin. They are found in the Caribbean coast, in Livingston (a Garifuna settlement), Puerto Barrios and Santo Tomas. In the 17th century, many enslaved blacks were able to secure for themselves or at least their future children through marriage to free people. Many of these marriages were with Mayans or Europeans, which created a mix between blacks, Mayans and Europeans. This resulted in a significant mestizo population that, over the years, has continued to dilute traces of African ancestry in many cases. Today this can be referred to as Afro-mestizos due to miscegenation.

However, there are two other groups in the country that are of African descent: Garifunas, an exiled Afro/Indigenous (primarily African) group, known in Spanish as zambo. They originally came from the Caribbean island of Saint Vincent (Antilles), where escaped enslaved Africans and Amerindians intermingled and created a society and culture of their own. Spanish colonist became afraid and exiled them to the smaller island of Roatan. After realizing the small island could not sustain their population, groups of Garifuna later settled on the Caribbean coasts of several mainland Central American countries, including Guatemala.

The other group are the descendants of Afro-West Indian migrants who came from English-speaking Caribbean islands in the late 19th and early 20th centuries primarily to work for the United Fruit Company, as well as to work on railroad building, and in the whaling industry.

== Origins ==
Due to the difficulty of slave ships arriving in Guatemala, buyers of the Kingdom of Guatemala depended on the vagaries of the market they did not control. For shipping list, we know that slaves came between the 15th and 16th centuries, mostly from Senegambia, Sierra Leone and the Gold Coast; in the seventeenth century, they came from the Gold Coast and the Bight of Benin. And in the eighteenth century, they came from Biafra (Nigeria), West Congo, Angola, Guinea and Benin (from Kingdom of Whydah). In this century also arrived slaves Aja (who were known as Arará, coming from Allada, Benin) and "creole", from Puerto Rico and Jamaica. Also arrived Calabari, from Havana, Cuba.

Many of the black slaves who worked in rural areas came usually of Senegambia. In addition, there were also many slaves bought in Luanda, Angola. There were also at least 30 other African ethnic groups - from the Central Africa - in Guatemala, chief among them the Kongo, and the mongiolos and anchico. Also, there was at least a dozen slaves from West Africa, some of them were bran (ethnic group from west of Ghana), Banyun (who were known as Banon, are established in Senegal, Gambia and Guinea Bissau) and biafadas (ethnic group of Guinea Bissau) people.

== History ==
=== Slavery ===
The first Afro-Guatemalan arrived in Guatemala in 1524 with Pedro de Alvarado (the “Conqueror of Guatemala”). Records of the Cabildo of Santiago, in Almolonga from the 1530s also mention some enslaved blacks. This first city, founded in 1527 with 150 Spanish residents, was destroyed in September 1541 by an avalanche of water and mud of the Volcán de Agua (Volcano of Water) that buried the Spanish sector of the capital with a large number of Native Americans and a small number of enslaved blacks. However, the first significant costs report data from 1543, when an estimated "150 pieces pig" of Santo Domingo were taken to the Caribbean coast of Guatemala. African slaves arrived in Guatemala to replace the indigenous population as labor, as their numbers had been reduced drastically from diseases such as measles, smallpox or bubonic plague. They were infected by the Spanish conquerors, and reduced to about a third of its population. African slaves were used in the sugar, indigo, and cochineal plantations. They were also used in the hacienda or large cattle ranch. Since Santiago was the political and economic center of Guatemala (and throughout the Spanish Central America), many of the slaves brought to the region were bought and sold there, and were baptized in their churches and parishes and possibly also in their monasteries. Between 1524 and 1620, a total of 10,000 Africans were brought to Guatemala. Because of the rise in power in the Middle East at the end of the sixteenth century, a large number of people started to be identified as mulatto. According to Robinson Herrera, of 250 Africans bought and sold in Santiago, about 40% came directly from Africa. Eighty slaves came from West Africa, particularly in Senegambia and the Central - Western Africa. For the other 50 people, 20% were criollos (slaves born in Spain, Portugal or America), and the other ten were mulattoes. Although there were few free mulattoes in the region at this time, their number was greater than the enslaved mulattoes. Between 1595 and 1640 there was an increase in the importation of slaves to Guatemala, but after 1640, imports sharply declined (some authors indicated even that the importation of slaves ceases). The first free black of Santiago first appeared already in the second half of the sixteenth century. Because of its small population, free blacks had to marry with other more numerous socioracials groups. Between 1595 and 1640, the Spanish crown signed a series of contracts with Portuguese traders to dramatically increase the number of African slaves in America. Many slaves came from the Angolan port of Luanda. Also, during the 17th century, some slaves could buy their freedom, forming a small community of free blacks. Runaway slaves formed Cimarrons societies, living among the population. Founded in 1590, the ingenuity of Asís, who became the most important in the seventeenth century, had more than 200 slaves and in 1633, the ingenuity of San Geronimo, north of Santiago, in Verapaz, was home to hundreds of slaves "of different nations" and became the largest in Central America. In 1821 there were more than 500 slaves.

In the late seventeenth century, the Afro - descendant was scattered to the south and east of Guatemala and El Salvador. The impact of African immigration in early colonial times was deeper in the sugar mill in Amatitlán and mint of Escuintepeque shores in San Diego de la Gomera. The Afro - descendants lived in nearly two dozen locations between Guatemala and El Salvador. In 1823, after independence arrived to Guatemala Garífuna groups from Honduras, they occupied the Caribbean lowland.

=== Miscegenation and growth of social status ===
During colonial times the abolition of slavery in Guatemala was important to the African population. Most Spanish houses of the time in Guatemala, especially in Santiago, had Indigenous servants and African slaves. In both cases, most of them were female. Because most Spanish who emigrated to Latin America at this time were men who did not bring their wives, they often had sex with her maids and female slaves, causing racial mixtures. This mixing increased while growing the Spanish settlers in the territory, racial mixture which was maintained until the destruction of Santiago by severe earthquakes in 1773 and the jurisdiction of the new capital in Guatemala City in 1770. With racial mixtures, mulattoes eventually came to outnumber blacks enslaved. On one side were those black and mulatto slaves who worked in houses and estates, and on the other side a large population of free blacks who lived scattered in towns and cities. The growing miscegenation between black slaves and free mulattoes increased the population of free mulattoes. The drastic reduction in the importation of slaves to Guatemala and increased free slaves eventually prompted some places that had a predominance of slaves to have a predominance of free blacks. Moreover, the mixture of mulattoes and mestizos caused higher incomes and a higher position for those with lighter skin. Some roads were blocked for people of African descent, especially in college and in the church. While miscegenation and learning the Spanish language and standards were increased, more Afro - Guatemalans had access to jobs. The slave population was also mixed with indigenous and white populations of Guatemala. The whole group of African people in the colony were not "pure black". The mulattoes were often involved in the illegal killing of livestock. Although we know little about Afro - Guatemalans working in the agricultural sector, several sources in the last third of the sixteenth century identified Afro farming communities in the present Jalapa, El Progreso, Santa Rosa and Jutiapa departments, and in the area surrounding the city of Sansonante, in the current El Salvador. Many of these slaves were born in Africa, usually in the region of Senegambia. However, it also had African slaves born in America. The Pacific coast was also home to many free blacks and mulattoes sticking by their great abilities as vagueros, to the extent that the laws of the sixteenth century forbidding them riding on horses or have weapons were almost always ignored because their skills were as necessary as feared—skills that would later make them valuable recruits from colonial militias and gave opportunity for upward social mobility. Free people of African descent and slaves also worked on the production of indigo in the Pacific coast of Guatemala and, especially, of El Salvador. People of African descent tended to work in the mills, usually doing the work of supervision during Xiquilite harvest. This station lasted only one or two months a year, making it unprofitable to maintain a permanent workforce of only enslaved workers to produce indigo. Some owners of mills hired more slaves of which then needed to produce indigo used for other activities, such as livestock.

Between 1595 and 1640, the Spanish crown signed a series of contracts with Portuguese traders to dramatically increase the number of African slaves in America. Many slaves came from the Angolan port of Luanda. Slaves were used as laborers in the sugar cane, since these years were enormously developing sugar production in the territory.

=== Afro-Guatemalan militias ===
In 1611, when the free mulattoes helped defeat the Maroons of Tutale, people of African descent were not allowed to officially participate in militia companies. However, Africans and their descendants, even enslaved, had fought with Spanish forces from time to time since the conquest. In the 1630s, a wave of attacks in Centre - America, by corsairs Dutch, French and British persuaded the Audiencia to enlist free people of African descent in regular militia companies, although segregated. In 1673 there were 6 Afro companies in Guatemala and two in El Salvador. Soon there were also places like chivalry in Sonsonate Department and Chiquimula. After early struggles against the corsairs, the Afro militias requested exemption of Laborío Tribute, threatening not to serve if they were not granted the exemption. Because of that, several companies of militia were granted temporary tax exemptions from Laborio during the 1690s, including the San Diego de la Gomera. The militants claimed this success and soon new Exemptions requested when aspirated initials. Soon, the rest of the Afro - descendants also expected to be relieved from the Laborío tribute, and prepared to face the authorities on the subject, rebelling against them.

=== Garifuna ===
The Garífuna people originated with the arrival of slaves from West Africa. Who arrived on the shores of the Caribbean island of Saint Vincent around 1635. Approximately 200 years later the descendants living on the Caribbean island of Saint Vincent, arrived in Central America. They settled in Guatemala, Belize, Honduras and Nicaragua. Which brought new music, culture, gastronomy, and languages to Central America. People on the Caribbean island of St. Vincent speak Garífuna, an Arawak language.

The Garifuna are the descendants of indigenous Arawak, Kalinago (Island Carib), and Afro-Caribbean people. They are also known as Garínagu, the plural of Garifuna. The founding population, estimated at 2,500 to 5,000 persons, were transplanted to the Central American coast from the Commonwealth Caribbean island of Saint Vincent, known to the Garínagu as Yurumein, now called Saint Vincent and the Grenadines in the Windward Islands in the British West Indies in the Lesser Antilles. By 1981, around 65,000 Black Caribs were living in fifty-four fishing villages in Guatemala, Belize, and Nicaragua. Garifuna communities still live in Saint Vincent and the Grenadines and abroad, including Garifuna Americans. Among the Guatemalan cities on the Bay of Amatique percentage of Garifuna is particularly high in Livingston.

Garifuna people in Guatemala: The small, remote town of Livingston in Guatemala's Caribbean coast. Is the main home of the country's Garifuna population, It is built by 53 communities. Approximately 45 villages, 4 farms and 4 hamlets where the most important activity is fishing. Livingston is surrounded by jungle, so the only way to get there is to take a boat (lancha). It is known today as a place to experience the Garifuna culture of Guatemala. At the same time it is a travel destination for visitors in search of a native Caribbean atmosphere.

Garifuna people in Honduras: Today the Garifuna population numbers approximately 100,000 living primarily in cities, and towns along the country's northern coast. Currently travelers who wish to experience elements of Garifuna culture and tradition in Honduras.

Garifuna people in Nicaragua: Nicaragua's population of around 8,000 Garifuna live mainly on Corn Island in the Caribbean Sea. The Garifuna people first arrived in Nicaragua around 1912, when a Garifuna leader, Joseph Sambola, founded the community of Orinoco.

== Notable people ==
- Kervin García
- Arquímides Ordóñez
- Yony Flores
- Colman Domingo
- Deborah David
- Guillermo Ramírez
- Tara Setmayer
