= Baraúnda =

Baraúnda was the wife of the Garifuna leader Satuyé. Her resistance to colonial rule is celebrated in oral tradition in Honduras and Belize, in songs sung by Garifuna women.
