= Garifuna Americans =

Americans descended from West African, Central African, Island Carib, and Arawak people

Total population
- c. 200,000 (2011)

Regions with significant populations
- New York City; South Florida; Boston; New Jersey; New Orleans; Houston; Chicago; Seattle; Greater Los Angeles; Southern California; Detroit; Columbus, Ohio; Las Vegas; Atlanta; Washington, D.C.; Philadelphia; Maryland; Arizona; Northern Virginia; North Carolina; South Carolina; Tennessee

Languages
- American English, Garifuna, Spanish language

Religion
- Predominantly Roman Catholic; Minority Protestantism

Related ethnic groups
- Garifuna; Afro-Caribbean, Afro-Honduran, Afro-Guatemalans, Afro-Nicaraguans, Caribbean American, West Indian

Garifuna Americans or Black Carib Americans are Americans of Garifuna ancestry, who are descendants of Arawak, Kalinago (Island Carib), and Afro-Caribbean people living in Saint Vincent. Many Garifuna were exiled from St. Vincent to the Central American countries of Honduras, Guatemala, Belize, and Nicaragua before moving to the United States.

== Cultural events ==
As of 2012, Abrazo Garifuna in New York, an event celebrating the contributions of Garifuna Americans to New York City is in its second year. Abrazo Garifuna in New York continues to be held annually as of 2014.

== Notable people ==
- Vic Barrett - activist
- Teofilo Colon Jr. - photographer
- O.T Genasis - rapper

== See also ==
- Garifuna music
- Happy Land fire
