= Mirtha Colón =

Honduran activist

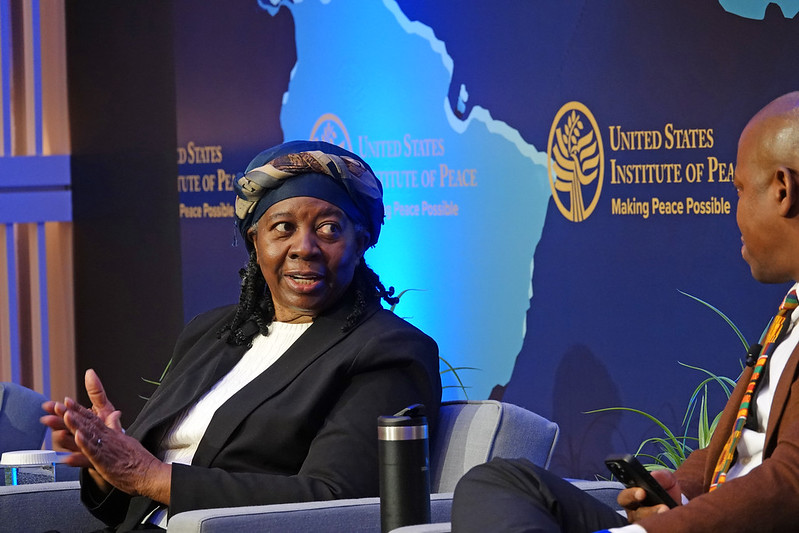
- Colón in 2024
- Born: May 18, 1951 (age 75); Trujillo, Honduras
- Occupations: social worker, activist
- Years active: 1984-present
- Known for: Garifuna preservation

Mirtha Colón (born May 18, 1951) is a Honduran-born Garifuna activist and social worker who assists Caribbean migrants in The Bronx and travels widely supporting the issues of HIV prevention, sex education and cultural preservation. In 2012, she was recognized by the New York State Legislature for her service to the African diaspora in the state.

== Early life ==
Mirtha Colón was born on May 18, 1951, in Trujillo on the Caribbean coast in the Colón Department of Honduras. She is of Garifuna heritage. With her mother and older sister, Colón moved often in her youth, traveling between urban centers along the coastal region of Honduras living in cities such as La Ceiba and San Pedro Sula. In 1962, Colón's oldest sister moved to The Bronx, where a large expatriate community of Garifuna lived. In 1968, the sister initiated the process for Colón to join her.

== Career and Education ==
Arriving in New York City, Colón began working in Brooklyn for a textile manufacturer. After her second child was born, she became determined to return to school. Colón enrolled in the General Educational Development (GED) program of the Hostos Community College and earned her certificate in 1984. Because of conflicts with her work schedule, she left Hostos and enrolled in social services courses at Boricua College.

Colón formed a transnational, nonprofit organization in 1992, Hondurans Against AIDS, to address the high numbers of HIV-positive Garifuna women. With her experience in social work, Colón recognized the need to educate, in a culturally sensitive manner, the Garifuna community of the Central American coastline, as well as those immigrant communities clustered around the Bronx neighborhoods of Crotona, Hunts Point, Morrisania and Mott Haven. Many of the community migrants speak the Garifuna language among themselves, isolating them from other Afro-Latino and Afro-American service networks. In 1994, when she completed her bachelor's degree in human services, Colón took employment as a social worker at Lincoln Hospital. While simultaneously raising two children and working full-time, Colón pursued graduate studies at Fordham University, completing her master's degree in social work in 1998.

In 2007, Colón expanded Hondurans Against AIDS, after receiving a Ford Foundation grant for $100,000. The organization created a headquarters, Casa Yurumein, hired an executive director, and began training network of health professionals to address HIV/AIDS among the African diaspora living in Belize, The Bronx, Guatemala, Honduras, and Nicaragua. Colón, who serves as the director, and her volunteers, assist with educational activities, monitoring patients to ensure they are adhering to treatment regimens, and identifying risk factors while respecting cultural traditions.

In 2012 Colón was one of New York State's Outstanding Career Serving Humanity Award recipients. Retired from her social work career, Colón still serves as executive director of Hondurans Against AIDS, traveling throughout the Garifuna homelands to improve social services to her community. In addition to healthcare, Colón promotes cultural events to create networks for improving communication among differing Garifuna populations. One such event was the 2010 community meeting with Mayor Michael Bloomberg. Other events include the Garifuna Nation Summit held in the Bronx in 2014 and an annually sponsored Ms Garifuna Pageant. In addition to her work in New York, Colón has served as president of the Central American Negro Organization (Spanish: Organización Negra Centroamericana (ONECA)), which was organized in 1995 to organize networks for Central American members of the African diaspora to address issues facing these populations.
