= Myrtle Palacio =

Educator and social planner from Belize

Iris Myrtle Palaciao
- Born: 1948 (age 77–78); Stann Creek Town, Belize
- Occupations: politician, historian, entrepreneur
- Political party: People's United Party
- Awards: Officer of the Order of the British Empire

Iris Myrtle Palaciao OBE (born in 1948, Stann Creek Town) is an educator and social planner from Belize. She is an advocate for Garifuna culture, and good governance in the public sector.

== Early life and education ==
Palacio was born in 1948 to parents Gwendolyn Trapp and Cornelius Cacho in Stann Creek Town. Her family are Garifuna - a community of people of mixed black African and indigenous Carib Indian heritage. Her brother was the politician Russell "Chiste" Garcia, he died in 2009. She married the Belizean anthropologist, Joseph Palacio, in 1968. They have two children.

Palacio attended Stann Creek Methodist School, then Wesley College In Belize City and later gained a Teaching Diploma from Belize Teacher's College. In 1981, Palacio decided to continue her education and was awarded a BA in Accounting and Business Management from the University of California, Berkeley. Her postgraduate education continued and she was awarded an MSc in Urban Studies by the University of New Orleans in 1995.

== Career ==
Palacio has three parallel careers: as a computer industry entrepreneur, a politician and a historian of Garifuna culture.

=== Computing ===
In 1984, Palacio set up Glessima, the first company in the computer industry in Belize. It aimed to employ women, enabling them to forge careers for themselves outside the home.

=== Politics ===
In 1999, Palacio was appointed to the role of Chief Elections & Boundaries Officer in Belize, and served as such until 2005. Her time as Chief Officer the department was computerized and she introduced voter education.

Palacio has formed part of or led teams on several occasions to observe international elections. In 2003, she led the team overseeing the voter re-registration procedures in Antigua & Barbuda. In 2015, she was part of the Commonwealth Election Observers Team overseeing the election in St Vincent & the Grenadines.

Also in 1999, she addressed the United Nations at the Hague, presenting a statement outlining the issues that Belize faced as a third world country and the measures that were being taken by the government to combat them. This was followed by a report exploring the North/South divide in Belize and the impact on the people.

Between 2005 and 2008, Palacio worked as the Director, Office of Governance. In 2010, Palacio produced a report on Belizean democracy, highlighting how far it had travelled, but also the issues it faced. In June 2011, she presented two publications "Elections in Belize: the Naked Truth" and "Adugurahani: A Walk Through Garifuna Spiritualism". From 2011 to 2015, Palacio worked as General Secretary of the People's United Party.

Palacio is an expert in the political history Belize. One of her observations in how the prevalence on call-in talk-shows on radio between 2003 and 2008 enabled political candidates to start arguments between one another, supported by people using phone cards pre-paid by political parties to support one side or the other and therefore try to manipulate public opinion. She has written about housing poverty in Belize, and measured that could be taken to change the situation for people in Belize.

== Garifuna Activism ==
Flag of Garifuna

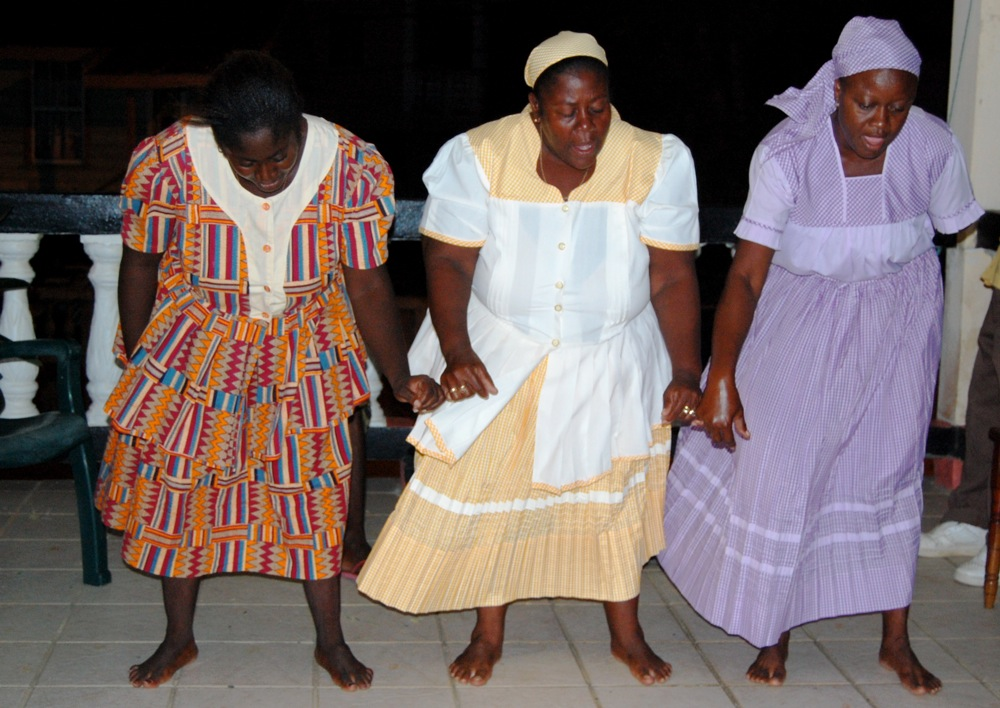
Garifuna dancers in Dangriga, Belize

Palacio is an outspoken advocate for Garifuna culture, writing some of the first books on the subject and speaking widely about her Garifuna identity. She is an expert on the history of the Garifuna - particularly how the population and culture evolved in Belize. One aspect she has written about is the how differently Garifuna and Creole populations were treated by the British colonisers: the Creole were less "stubborn" and so were given more official appointments, which led to them having significantly more political and economic power. She has written about Garifuna emigration to the USA.

In her book Adügürahani, Palacio is the first person to write a description of the Dugu Ceremony and its nine rituals, which are highly important to Garifuna spiritual life. The Primer aimed to explain Garifuna culture to all, but with a particular focus on children's education.

== Honours ==
In the 1999 Birthday Honours, Palacio was appointed a Member of the Order of the British Empire, for service to community in Belize. In the 2007 New Years Honours, she was awarded the higher honour of Officer of the Order of the British Empire.

== Publications ==
- Who and what in Belizean elections: 1954-1993. Glessima Research, 1993
- The First Primer on the People called Garifuna. Glessima Research & Services, 1993
- Adügürahani: A Walk Through Garifuna Spiritualism, Glessima Research & Services, 2011
- Electoral Politics in Belize: The Naked Truth, Glessima Research & Services, 2011
