= Teofilo Colon Jr. =

American journalist

- Born: New York City, U.S.
- Other names: Tío Teo; Teofilo Campeon
- Occupations: Photographer; Filmmaker; Writer; Journalist
- Years active: 2010-present
- Organization: Being Garifuna
- Website: beinggarifuna.com

Teofilo Colon Jr. (born 1974) is a Garifuna-American photographer, filmmaker, writer and journalist. Colon has created an online archive of information about the Garifuna culture, an Afro-Caribbean population made up of formerly African, Island Caribs, Arawak people exiled by the British from Saint Vincent Island to Roatán, an island off the coast of Honduras, who eventually emigrated to the Caribbean coasts of the Central American countries of Honduras, Belize, Guatemala, Nicaragua - with its biggest concentration outside that area in New York City, found most intensively in the Bronx.

== Early life ==
Colon was born and grew up in the East New York neighborhood of Brooklyn. Although his parents, mother Raymunda "Reina Gringa" Colon (née Alvarez Casildo) and father Teofilo Colon Sr. were both from Honduras and spoke Spanish and Garifuna at home, Colon only spoke English. Colon's parents were from the Tocamacho (known as Dugamachu in Garifuna) on his paternal side and Plaplaya (known as Bülagüriba in Garifuna) on his maternal side—two small villages of Garifuna territories off the northern coast of Honduras. Colon began to learn the Garifuna language as an adult.

== Career ==
In addition to his freelance work in film and video and as a photographer for Friends of Crotona Park, Inc. in 2008, Colon began a Facebook group called "You Know You Are Garifuna/Garinagu When..." as an experiment to try and see how many Garifuna people he could find on Facebook. After connecting with thousands of Garinagu (plural for Garifuna), in an effort to understand more about his culture and provide a centralized resource of information, Colon created the Being Garifuna website to document stories and news about Garifuna people, history, and culture. The website is an online resource for people of Garifuna background to learn more about their culture and find news on current Garifuna cultural activities.

Among the work he has compiled about art and music of Garifuna people, Colon did extensive research on victims of the Happyland Fire, a fire that killed many people who were thought to be of Garifuna background. One of the victims of the tragedy was Colon's cousin.

In November 2010, Colon was recognized for his contribution to Garifuna culture by the Garifuna Coalition with a Garifuna Coalition Recognition award. In 2013, Colon was also Honorary Grand Marshal of the 2013 New Jersey Folk Festival.
