= The Drama of King Shotaway =

Play believed to be by William Henry Brown

The Drama of King Shotaway, founded on Facts taken from the Insurrection of the Caravs on the Island of St. Vincent, written from Experience by Mr. Brown (1823) was a play believed to be by William Henry Brown. The first known play by a black playwright in the United States, no known copies of the play exist.

Brown, who founded the African Theatre troupe in the 1820s, was from the West Indies and became established in New York. He was both a playwright and the proprietor of the African Grove Theatre, which produced the play.

The play was based on the life of Joseph Chatoyer (Satuye), a Garifuna chief who led a revolt of Black Carib people on the Caribbean island of St. Vincent against British rule in 1795.

It was produced in 1823 by the African Company at the African Grove Theatre in New York City, which was the first resident African-American company. It was the first known play written in the United States by a black man.
