= Chatoyer =

Chatoyer may refer to:

- Joseph Chatoyer, Garifuna chief
- Chatoyancy, a visual quality of some gems
