= African Grove =

Former New York theatre

Coordinates: 40.723°N 74.004°W

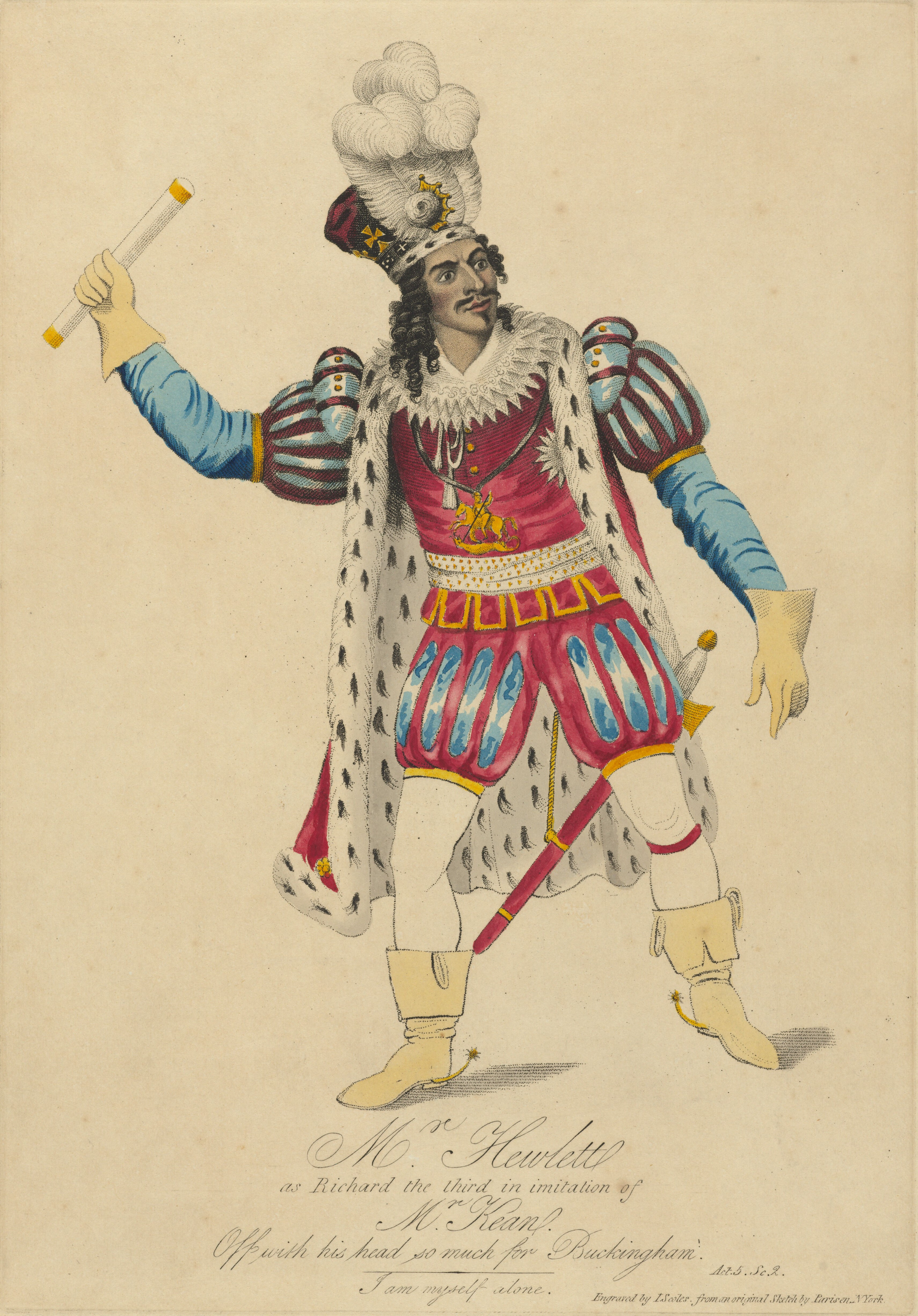
James Hewlett as Richard III in a c. 1821 production.

The African Grove Theatre opened in New York City in 1821. It was founded and operated by William Alexander Brown, a free black man from the West Indies. It opened six years before the final abolition of slavery in New York state (gradual abolition brought it to an end in 1827, but young people born to slave mothers had to serve apprenticeships to age 21). The African Grove Theatre was attended by "all types of black New Yorkers -- free and slave, middle-class and working-class" along with others. It was the first place where Ira Aldridge, who would later become an esteemed and renowned Shakespearian actor, first saw a production of a Shakespeare play.

== Background ==
For some years, the African Company—the company of the African Grove—played classics and many other plays with an entirely black cast and crew to mostly black audiences. It was the third of at least four attempts to create a black theater in the city, and the most commercially successful. At one point the theatre had to build an extra level of seats to house white audiences that wanted to see the performances. After a few years, city officials shut down the African Grove, because of complaints about conduct: conduct that was normal among working-class white New York theatre audiences of the time was considered unacceptably boisterous when displayed by blacks. It is thought that the real reason was because this black theatre was becoming as successful as many other venues. One source says that the theatre was "mysteriously burned to the ground in 1826". "There are no records of the African Grove Theater after 1823."

The theatre was founded by William Alexander Brown, a pioneering actor and playwright from the West Indies. He had worked as a ship's steward at times. Through his work as a ship's steward, he traveled to England and the Caribbean, so he had a broader opportunity to see theatre than the typical New Yorker. The West-Indies-born Brown left a job on a Liverpool ship and bought a house in New York, at 38 Thomas Street. At the start, Brown held performances of the African Grove in his back yard, where he offered food and drink, but also poetry and short drama pieces. At the suggestion of James Hewlett, both an entertainer and a regular customer, together they hired other black actors.

The theater's repertoire drew heavily on Shakespeare, with comic entr'actes. White audience members were confined to a separate section because, in the words of the theater's management, "whites do not know how to conduct themselves at entertainments for ladies and gentlemen of color." The most popular plays were Richard III and Othello. James Hewlett was the first black man of record to play the leading role in Othello.

As was common at the time, the producers adapted Shakespeare's plays. Small casts and smaller budgets required expedients such as that described by the reviewer George Odell, writing of an 1821 performance of Richard III: "A dapper, wooly haired waiter at the City Hotel personated the royal Plantagenet in robes made up from discarded merino curtains of the ballroom. Owing to the smallness of the company King Henry and the Duchess were played by one person, and Lady Anne and Catesby by another. Lady Anne, in Act III, sang quite incongruously." The scholar Laura V. Blanchard identifies Odell's "dapper waiter" as the actor James Hewlett.

Frequently harassed by the police, and facing increasing hostility from the white populace, the company moved several times, from Thomas Street north to Bleecker and Mercer Streets. At the time this was the edge of the developed parts of New York City. When Brown moved his theatre from 38 Thomas Street to Bleecker and Mercer Streets, he had a dilemma. Realizing that his theatre now was located too far from its core audience ("free persons of color"), he constructed a theatre building which was near a popular white theater called the Park Theatre.

When the Park Theatre—New York City's leading theater of the time— put on Richard III starring the English tragedian Junius Brutus Booth, the African Company rented a hall next door for its own production of the same play the same night. Theatrical competition was stiff; Stephen Price, owner of the Park, orchestrated (and paid for) a disturbance over the rival productions so that the police would shut down the African Grove.

In addition to Shakespeare, the African Company performed original works, which included William A. Brown's now-lost play, The Drama of King Shotaway. The play depicted the involvement of Garifuna leader Joseph Chatoyer in the Second Carib War on the island of Saint Vincent. Produced by the African Company in 1823, Drama is believed to have been the first full-length play by a black American performed in the United States.

Despite the frequent changes in location and its short period of productions, the African Grove Theatre was important as a venue for noted African-American actors, such as James Hewlett.

== See also ==
- Slavery in New York
