= Joseph Palacio =

Garifuna Belizean anthropologist (born 1943)

Joseph Palacio (born 1943) is a Garifuna Belizean anthropologist. He was the first Belizean Garifuna to complete a doctorate degree in anthropology and is a leading promoter of Garifuna language, history, and culture. He also serves as Chairman of the Barranco Village Council, his birth village.

== Biography ==
Joseph Palacio was born in Barranco, the southernmost village in Belize. He attended secondary school in Belize City before continuing his education at the University of Toronto, the University of Manitoba at Winnipeg and earning a PhD in Anthropology from the University of California-Berkeley in 1982. He is married to Myrtle Palacio, a politician and activist - their wedding was in 1968. He served as Belize’s Archaeological Commissioner from 1971 to 1976 where he was instrumental for developing legislation relating to the excavation and preservation of Belizean archeological sites. Palacio then joined the faculty at the University of the West Indies where he taught indigenous history and community development alongside founding the first formal Garifuna language training program. He was a founding member of the Caribbean Organization of Indigenous People’s (COIP).

Palacio has written many monographs and academic articles, including a collection of essays titled “The Garifuna: A Nation Across Borders.”
