= Duvalle =

Duvalle (fl. 1795) was a Black Carib chief who commanded troops on the leeward side of Saint Vincent after the death of his brother Joseph Chatoyer during the Second Carib War.

He succeeded Chief Joseph Chatoyer as leader of the Black Caribs/Garifunas of St. Vincent who were resisting the British takeover of the island after Chatoyer was killed in action on March 14, 1795. While some Caribs fought alongside the British forces, Duvalle formed an alliance with the French Republic who were at war with Britain at the time.

His camp was captured by British forces and Duvalle capitulated in October 1796 when the British emerged victorious in the conflict and the Black Caribs were deported to the island Baliceaux.

== Legacy ==
Duvalle, along with Chatoyer, are remembered in Garifuna literature for the actions during the Carib Wars.
