= Dionisia Amaya =

Dionisia Amaya-Bonilla
- Born: Dionisia Amaya; February 8, 1933; La Ceiba, Honduras
- Died: February 3, 2014 (aged 80); La Ceiba, Honduras
- Other names: Mama Nicha; Doña Nicha
- Citizenship: United States
- Occupation: Garifuna community activist
- Years active: 1974-2014

Dionisia Amaya-Bonilla, also known as Mama Nicha, (February 8, 1933 – February 3, 2014) was a teacher and Honduran Garifuna community activist who was the co-founder of Garifuna non-profit organization, MUGAMA, Inc., a support, education, and outreach organization that ran the Mugama Advocacy Center in Brooklyn, New York.

== Early life ==
Amaya-Bonilla was born in La Ceiba, Honduras, in 1933. Amaya-Bonilla went to the United States in May 1964 from Honduras originally going to Fort Worth, Texas, where she worked as a housekeeper until moving to New York City. She first lived on Longfellow in the Bronx until moving to East New York. She received her American citizenship in 1977.

After getting her General Equivalency Diploma, in 1979, Amaya-Bonilla received a B.A. with high honors in Education from Medgar Evers College in New York City. She also has a M.A. and Advanced Certificate in Guidance and Counseling from Brooklyn College.

== Career ==
After moving to New York City, Amaya-Bonilla worked in many different jobs, one of which was with Franciscan friars, who gave her a recommendation that led to a job at World Book Encyclopedia, where she worked for five years.

Amaya-Bonilla worked at the NYC Board of Education in various positions as a teacher until eventually working as a guidance counselor. She worked in these positions for over 22 years.

Outside of her education and counseling work, Amaya-Bonilla worked with her church, St. Mathews Catholic Church, to provide fundraising and support to her community. Notable relief efforts included the 1974 Hurricane Fifi that hit Honduras and the 1990 Happy Land Fire. In 1991, the Mugama organization created a scholarship fund in honor of a Garifuna who died in the fire. From 1989 until her death, Amaya-Bonilla was a Eucharistic Minister at Lady of Mercy Church in Brooklyn, New York.

Amaya-Bonilla helped to organize Committee for Development in Honduras (COPRODH) in the mid-1970s in direct response of helping Hondurans affected by Hurricane Fifi, and Hondurans in the United States. Amaya-Bonilla was a strong supporter of the value of education in helping her community, so she worked to support recent Garifuna immigrants in their effort to learn English and get an education to advance themselves.

In January 1989, Amaya-Bonilla, Mirtha Sabio, and Lydia Sacasa-Hill, and others founded an organization called MUGAMA, to recognize the contributions of Garifunan women's accomplishments. The organization was inspired by International Women's Day, in an effort to honor women in the Garifuna community. MUGAMA held conferences and provided recognition within the community, gained non-profit status, and worked to help people get their General Equivalency Diploma and English as a second or foreign language, and U.S. citizenship. The name MUGAMA came from Garifuna Women Marching in Action aka Women on the Move Pro-Education=Mujeres Garifunas en Marcha Pro-Educación, with Garinagu the plural word for Garifuna people. MUGAMA was based out of the Riverdale Osborne Towers in East New York.

In 1991, MUGAMA was a sponsor of the First Intercontinental Garifuna Summit Meeting conference that was held at Medgar Evers College in Brooklyn, New York. The event was the first of its kind to bring Garifuna people from the United States together to have a political and cultural exchange of resources and establish a large community gathering.

Amaya-Bonilla was a founding member of the Federation of Honduran Organizations of New York (FEDOHNY).

== Honors ==
- June 12, 2003: House of Representatives Hon. Edolphus Towns honored Amaya-Bonilla for her contributions to her community
- January 18, 2004: Brooklyn Borough President Marty Markowitz proclaimed Mrs. Dionisia Amaya Day in Brooklyn
- 2009: Garifuna Coalition Award given to MUGAMA

== Personal life ==
Amaya-Bonilla was married to Alejandro Bonilla.

Amaya-Bonilla died in 2014 in La Ceiba, Honduras, from a stroke.
