= African Theatre (acting troupe) =

African-American acting troupe

The African Theatre was an African-American acting troupe in New York City established by William Henry Brown (also known as William Alexander Brown) in the 1820s. The troupe performed plays by Shakespeare and plays written by Brown, several of which were anti-colonization and anti-slavery. Its leading actor was James Hewlett.

The African Theatre is, as far as records report, the first known black theatre company in North America. The vast majority of documents with information pertaining to the African Theatre have been reportedly burned and destroyed. The African Theatre developed from the African Grove Theatre, which was situated at the back of William Henry Brown's home at 38 Thomas Street, West of Broadway, and it opened for about three or four summers prior to 1821.

The troupe faced violence, including attacks by thugs hired by the Park Theatre. Little is known of the participants as a result of the destruction of the records of the troupe.

== Early African Theater ==
The theatre had promenades for patrons to explore, as well as separate stalls furnished with tables and chairs where guests could recline for refreshments. There was a bar or service area and possibly an al fresco platform for performers. Originally the Grove itself was more of a place to hang out outside. Unfortunately the Grove did not last long. The neighbors did not take the noise too well. They complained about having to contend with loud noisy crowds on a regular basis. William Henry Brown used the impromptu performances from patrons at the Grove as a casual form of auditions for possible recruits to the stage for his fledgling theatre company. He quickly converted the rooms upstairs into a small theatre. He selected a play and quickly recruited a cast based on those who performed at the Grove. He posted playbills all around announcing their opening performance.

The African Theatre formally opened on September 17, 1821, with a performance of Shakespeare's renowned play Richard III, starring an all-black cast. The instability of the current venue prompted an eventual relocation. The neighbors reportedly complained again, which led to Brown to decide to move his theatre to a unoccupied suburban house on the corner of Mercer and Bleecker Streets. About a week later, his troupe offered an evening's entertainment consisting of a reenactment of Richard III as well as an opera, a pantomime, and a ballet. Performances continued at this site on Monday evenings throughout October and November, with Friday being added eventually thanks to popular demand. During early performances, a group of people, including a man named George Bellmont, invaded the playhouse, assaulting the actors and destroying costumes and pieces of the sets. This preceded into a fight between the actors and Bellmont's group. Bellmont and a number of his group were arrested after the attack.

Very little is known about the interior of the Theatre or its settings, though it has been described by patrons in a negative light as "pathetic and ominous", and "resembling a dirty kitchen", harking back to the theatre's humble origins as a local hangout. These descriptions are also indicative of the theatre's lack of commercial success and proper funding. The theatre contained a room for an orchestra, which was composed of two white men, and one black. The auditorium included a box, pit, and gallery, with exceptionally high prices of 75, 50, and 37 cents. When trying to summarize the activities of the African Theatre, the known record remains incomplete. Rather than placing advertisements or articles in any newspapers about performances, Brown generally just handed playbills and advertisements out on the streets and invited people to the theatre. The African Theatre productions were not taken seriously by any journalists of important newspapers, resulting in the performances being ignored by the press for the most part. During the first year it changed from only being directed towards the Black community to being directed at New Yorkers in general, which meant that the white audience grew significantly. Many of the performers were servants in their day jobs, and many of their employers would attend the theatre at night.

The issues relating to the theatre on Mercer and Bleeker prompted another change in venue, this time to the City Hotel, a venue with better accommodation and in a better location. This new location also happened to be next door to the Park Theatre, a well established white theatre. A controversy ensued among the white theatre patrons, who claimed that the African Theatre patrons were too riotous of character, and as a result the police would eventually mandate that the African Theatre announce their last performance. Defying the authorities, the theatre continued to put on nightly performances. Despite its best efforts, however, the theatre was eventually forced to return to the prior location on Mercer Street.

== Notable figures ==
The company, established in the 1820s by William Henry Brown, was created in response to the demand for entertainment centers open to Black communities. Brown was a businessman looking for ways to generate profit, but he also aimed to create a community in the arts for Black people to socialize, perform, and foster self-determination.

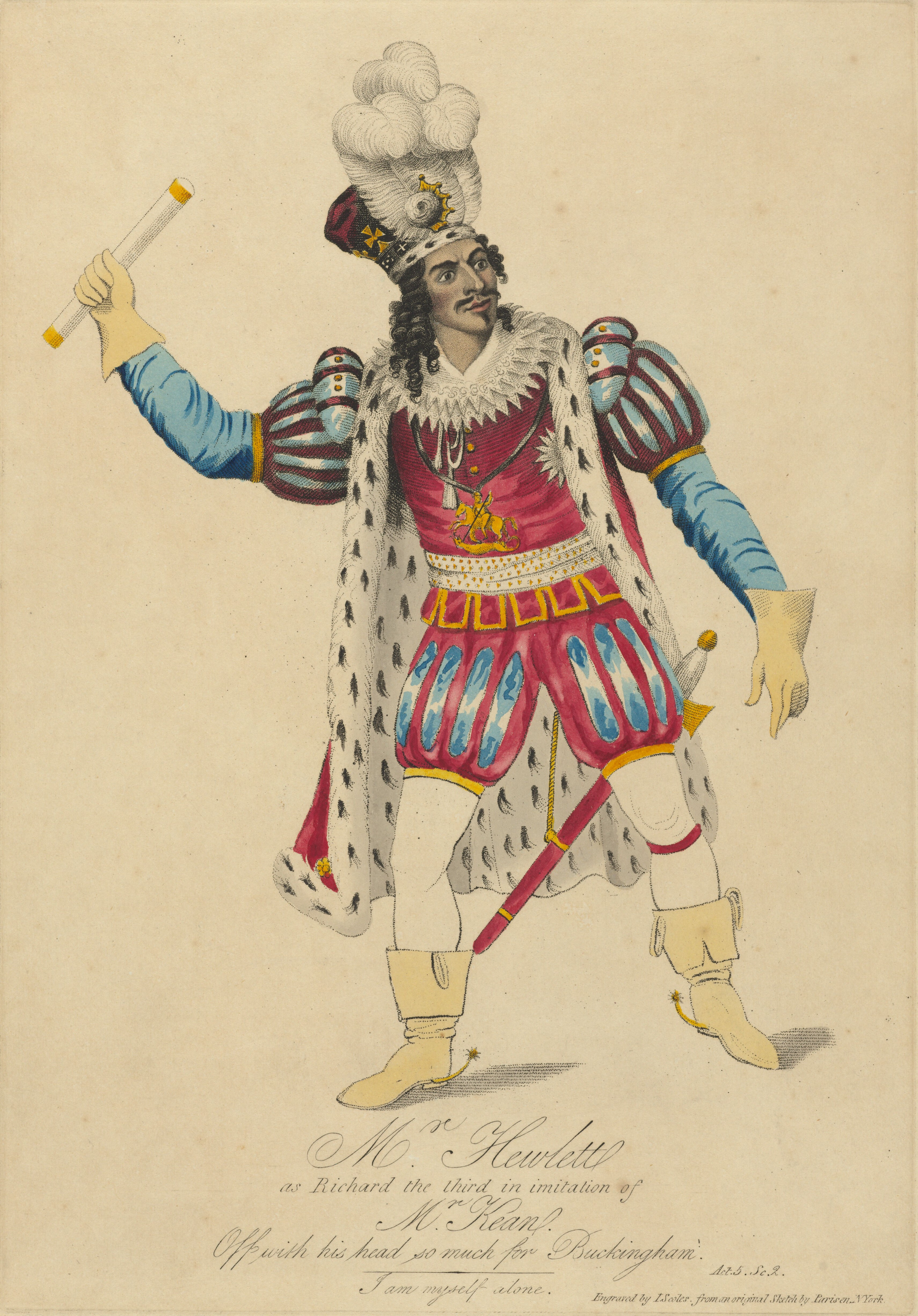

The Theater's leading actor, James Hewlett, is also the co-founder of the troupe who advocated for the hiring of more black actors. Prior to working full-time as a performer, Hewlett worked as a steward. Hewlett is the first African-American Shakespearean actor. Before co-founding, he was known to be a regular visitor and entertainer at Brown's backyard poetry functions, which are the known origins of The African Theater. Since Brown could not pay Hewlett a full salary, Hewlett continued working as a steward while performing. His last performance at the African Theater took place in 1824 prior to its close before being sold. The play was a solo, performed as a benefit in support of Greece during their war of independence from Turkey.

The first performance of Richard III starred Charles Taft in the lead role because Hewlett was working on a ship and did not return until the second performance. Taft, fired from his job as a servant, became infatuated with theatre and was destroyed emotionally, in shambles, when Hewlett returned. During his work on the ship, Hewlett created a fancy costume for his performance. Taft, on the other hand, wore a robe made of a curtain. Hewlett had no competition, and was quickly welcomed back into the role.

The company is also known for the introduction of Ira Aldridge, considered to be one of the first impactful Black American Shakespearean actors, who was born in 1807 in New York City. His theatrical career was notably interesting and extremely prominent, but prior to taking a larger stage, he worked as a costume carrier for British actors and performed in smaller drama productions of ragtag companies. Aldridge worked as an actor in the British Isles beforehand, knowing that there was not yet opportunity for him to pursue acting in The United States. The actor garnered recognition with the role of Othello in Shakespeare's play of the same name. This proved a struggle to Aldridge both as a performer and financially, as there were few roles that African Americans would be given the allowance to take on at this time in history. However, he also proved himself through taking on roles that carried anti-slavery sentiments, and consisted of portraying various roles that captured the struggles of slaves in what would then be called The New World. It was not until he reached mid-life, aged approximately 40, that Aldridge was able to perform other Shakespearean roles such as Macbeth or Richard III, breaking free of his role as Othello. The launch of the roles are recorded to have taken place in Hull, a town that his biographers say is a place where "...one could take risks that might not have been so well-received elsewhere."
