= James Hewlett (actor) =

American actor (fl. 1821–1849)

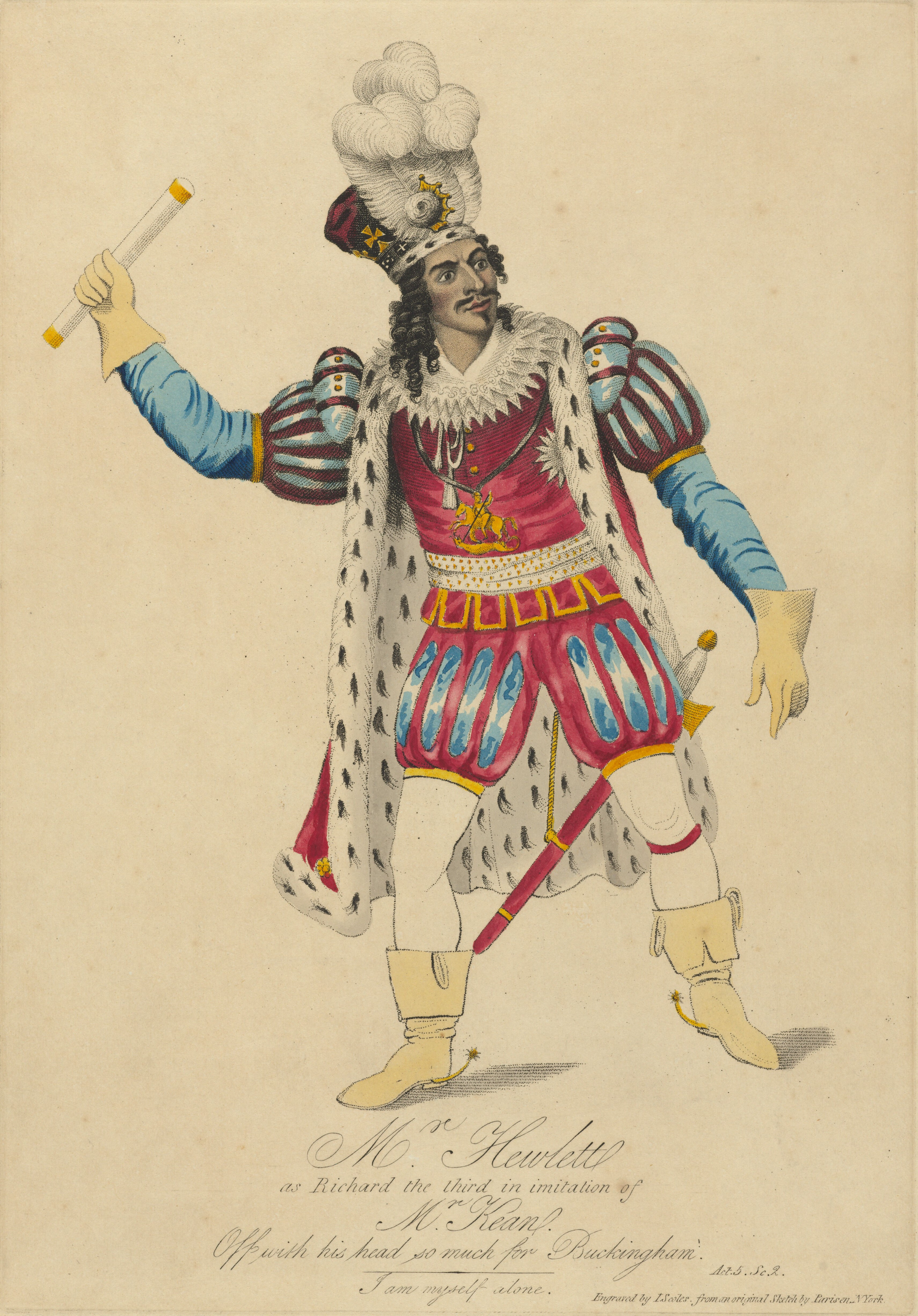
James Hewlett as Richard III in a c. 1821 production

James Hewlett (fl. 1821 – 1849) was an African-American actor. He was principal actor in and co-creator of William Alexander Brown's African Grove Theatre in New York City.

== Life ==
Hewlett started performing as a vocalist and as an actor described as "Shakespeare's proud Representative" in the African Grove when it was just an exhibition held in Brown's tea garden. Hewlett is best known for starring in African Grove's performance of Richard III. After the closure of the theatre, he began to tour performing excerpts from plays; historian Shane White suggests that Hewlett may have been "the best-known black New Yorker" around 1831. He also visited the United Kingdom and apparently performed in Liverpool, although documentary evidence of this is limited. His career seems to have entered into a decline by and after 1834, when he was imprisoned for larceny. He is reported to have died around 1849.

George Thompson, who has researched the history of the theatre, concluded that Hewlett was a tailor and may have been an emigrant from the West Indies.
