= Lebeha Drumming Center =

The Lebeha Drumming Center was established in 2002 by Jabbar Lambey and Dorothy Pettersen, in Hopkins, Belize. Hopkins is a small coastal Garifuna community in the Stann Creek District of southern Belize. The center exists with the goals of keeping Garifuna music alive, passing traditional music along to young people in the community, and sharing music with visitors to Hopkins. The center's focus is on traditional percussion music, though guitars have been donated and are also played.

The young people who play and take lessons at the drumming center perform regularly, and in 2006, they recorded a CD entitled Traditional Garifuna Music played by Youth from Hopkins, Belize, published by Innova Recordings. The album was shortlisted for a Grammy Award nomination in the Traditional Music category.

== Garifuna instruments ==
Traditional Garifuna drums, or garaones, are handmade of mahogany wood and deer hide. The drumhead is secured to the wooden body with cordage that is laced around the head and attached through holes at the bottom of the drum. These are tension drums; they are tuned by way of wooden pegs attached to the cordage that can be wound to tighten or loosen the drumhead. Additionally, these drums often have a thin wire or piece of fishing line stretched across the head in order to create a buzzing sound, an aesthetic which is common in much Central and West African music, and has been preserved in Garifuna music. The drums at Lebeha are crafted by master drum-maker Austin Rodriguez, whose workshop is located in Dangriga, Belize.

There are two main types of drums used in Garifuna music: Primero and Segunda. The primera (or lanigi, “heart-drum”, in Garifuna) is the higher-pitched of the two, and serves to accent dancers’ movements. The segunda, or lufarugu (“shadow-drum”), which provides the beat for dancers. Sometimes a third drum, the tercera, or luruwahn (“third drum”) is the lowest-pitched of the three and serves as a bass drum. The presence of the tercera allows the Segunda to play more syncopated rhythms.

== Traditional Garifuna music ==
Punta is a traditional Belizean music and dance, often performed during festivals. This is the genre that has influenced the evolution of the popular music style punta rock. Paranda refers to both a Garifuna rhythm, and a musical genre that features Garifuna drumming, guitar, and singing. Lyrics in this genre are often nostalgic, and paranda is usually performed by men. One can hear the Latin/Spanish influence in this style of music.

== Popular Garifuna music ==
Belize's most well-known popular musical style is Punta rock, a style of dance music that combines traditional Garifuna rhythms with western popular music elements, including electric and bass guitars and keyboard.
