= William Alexander Brown =

American playwright and theatrical producer (1790–1884)

William Alexander Brown, also known as William Henry Brown (c. 1790–1884), was an American playwright and theatrical producer. He is considered the first known black playwright in America.

== Biography ==
Willian A. Brown was born in the West Indies, and worked there as a ship steward. After retiring from his maritime work, he settled in a community of free Blacks in the lower Manhattan district of New York City.

In 1816 he opened a summer tea garden in New York called the African Grove Theatre, the first resident all-Black theatre company in America, to cater to the community of free Blacks. The African Grove featured music, theatrical and occasionally outdoor entertainment until officials closed it down in 1821.

Brown reformed his group of performers in the African Theatre (also known as the African Company) and continued to perform outdoors. Brown's theatre company was constantly harassed by "White hoodlums". Eventually, the nearby Park Theatre, fearing competition, and the city sheriff forced the African Theatre to close. Brown continued performing outdoors illegally. The last record performance of the African Theatre was on Mercer and Houston Street in January 1824. It was not until after the American Civil War that all-Black theatre companies began to emerge again.

The African Theatre presented a programme of classical plays, popular plays, ballet, music and opera. The theater produced Shakespearean works, as well as plays written by Brown.

Brown also wrote a number of original plays for them to perform. His most notable play The Drama of King Shotaway (1823), based on the life of Black Carib leader Joseph Chatoyer (whom Brown called Shotaway in the play) and his revolt against British rule, is considered the first play written by a person of African descent in America. It is thought that Brown may have had first hand experience of the Carib Wars when he worked as a ship's steward at the time of the Atlantic slave trade.

== Significance ==
William Brown established the first US theater that catered to black people in the ways that only white audiences had been catered to previously. It was one of the first spaces that gave free blacks a sense of inclusion, as well as the ability to immerse themselves in theatrical culture and see a reflection of themselves in works written by black playwrights and performed by black actors.

The African Theater, or the American Theater, had its first produced play on September 17, 1821, which was Richard III. The African Theater moved to 1215 Mercer Street in New York City in the year 1822. Brown has been said to allow a white audience in the theater but were only allowed to sit in the back of the house. He said, "Whites do not know how to conduct themselves at the entertainments of ladies and gentlemen of Colour." The company then went on to produce more plays, such as William Moncrieff's Tom and Jerry. In 1824, however, the African Theater was closed.

== Controversy ==
Brown's theater proved to be highly successful and threatening to neighboring theaters, particularly when he opened up a theater space next door to the well-established Park Theater. Shortly after, the police shut down the theater after complaints from the owner of the Park Theater — Stephen Price — and white theater goers.
