= Joseph Chatoyer =

Garifuna rebellion leader (died 1795)

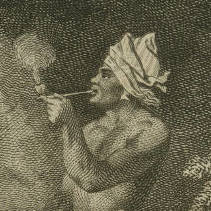
- Chatoyer the Chief of the Black Charaibes in St. Vincent, 1796
- Died: 14 March 1795

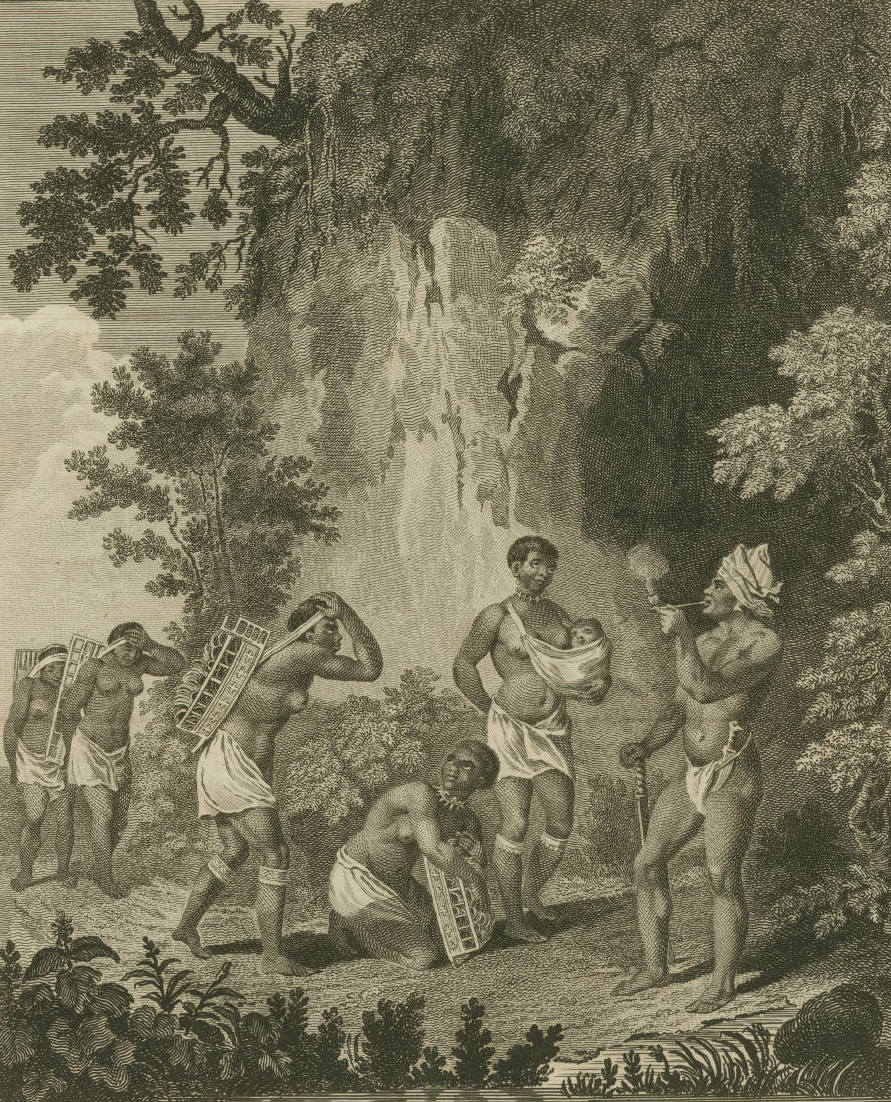
Chatoyer in St.Vincent, in an 1801 engraving

Joseph Chatoyer, also known as Satuye (died 14 March 1795), was an Indigenous (Garifuna or Black Carib) chief who led a revolt against the British colonial government of Saint Vincent in 1795. Killed that year, he is now considered a national hero of Saint Vincent and the Grenadines, and also of Belize and Costa Rica. Vincentian politician Camillo Gonsalves described him in 2011 as his country's "sole national hero".

== History ==
In 1772, the population rebelled. Led by Chatoyer, the First Carib War forced the British to sign a treaty with them in 1773. This was the first time Britain had been forced to sign an accord with non-white people in the Caribbean since the Maroon treaty of Jamaica in 1739.

By 1795, it became apparent to the local population that Britain had no intention of obeying the treaty. The people of the Caribbean then rose in rebellion and were joined by a group of French radicals, inspired by the ideals of the French Revolution, who saw Britain as a traditional enemy of France. In the Second Carib War, Chatoyer divided the island with his brother Duvalle, who was another chieftain. Duvalle had a Guadeloupean lieutenant by the name of Massoteau. Working his way along the coast, Chatoyer was met by his French supporters at Chateaubelair, and together the forces worked their way to Dorsetshire Hill, from where they would launch their attack on the capital city, Kingstown.

On March 14, a battalion of British soldiers led by General Ralph Abercromby, marched toward Dorsetshire Hill. That night, Chatoyer was killed by Major Alexander Leith. Though the rebellion continued until October 1796 under the leadership of Duvalle, Chatoyer's death led to the desertion of the French supporters and without their aid, the tide of the war turned in favour of the British.

As a national hero of Saint Vincent and the Grenadines, Chatoyer is recognized with a monument on Dorsetshire Hill, where he died.

== Legacy ==
Although Chatoyer died before the remainder of the rebels were deported to Roatán in Honduras, from where they spread along the Caribbean coast of Central America and became known as the Garifuna people; he is considered to have been a Garifuna warrior.

After a major push led by the National Youth Council of St. Vincent and the Grenadines and other groups, Chatoyer became the nation's first National Hero on March 14, 2002. Since then, March 14th has been celebrated as National Heroes Day, a time when many can remember the struggle against British and French colonialism.

A play based on his life, The Drama of King Shotaway, was written by William Henry Brown, a Garifuna from the West Indies, and Director of the African Theatre. It was the first play written in the United States by a black man. The play was produced by the African Company at the African Grove Theatre in New York City in 1823, but no manuscript survived.
