= Garifuna language =

Arawakan language of Central America

Garifuna
- Karif
- Native to: North Coast of Honduras and Guatemala, Belize, Nicaragua's Mosquito Coast
- Region: Historically the Northern Caribbean coast of Central America from Belize to Nicaragua
- Ethnicity: Garifuna
- Native speakers: (120,000 cited 2001–2019)
- Language family: Arawakan: Northern; Ta-Arawakan; Igñeri; Garifuna
- Early forms: Proto-Arawakan: Igñeri; Kalinago

Official status
- Recognised minority language in: Belize; Guatemala

Language codes
- ISO 639-3: cab
- Glottolog: gari1256
- ELP: Garífuna
- Linguasphere: 82-ABA-ba
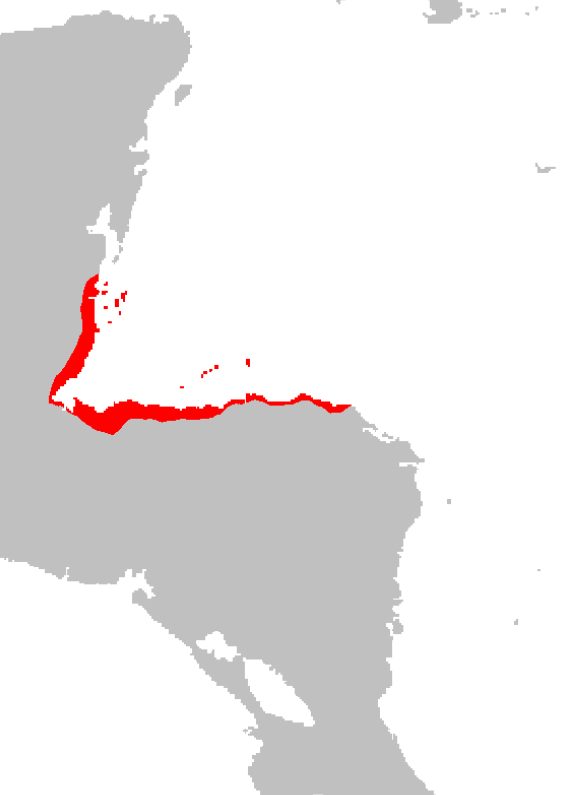

- Garífuna is classified as Vulnerable by the UNESCO Atlas of the World's Languages in Danger

Language, dance and music of the Garifuna
- UNESCO Intangible Cultural Heritage
- Country: Belize, Guatemala, Honduras, and Nicaragua
- Reference: 00001
- Region: Latin America and the Caribbean

Inscription history
- Inscription: 2008 (3rd session)
- List: Representative

Recording of a Garifuna speaker

Garifuna (Karif) is a minority language widely spoken in villages of Garifuna people in the western part of the northern coast of Central America.

It is a member of the Arawakan language family, but an atypical one, since it is spoken outside the Arawakan language area, which is otherwise confined to the northern parts of South America. It is also unusual because it contains a high number of loanwords, both from Carib languages and some European languages, due to a tumultuous past involving warfare, migration and colonization.

The language was once confined to the Antillean islands of St. Vincent and Dominica, but its speakers, the Garifuna people, were deported by the British in 1797 to the north coast of Honduras from where the language and Garifuna people has since spread along the coast south to Nicaragua and north to Guatemala and Belize.

Parts of Garifuna vocabulary are split between men's speech and women's speech, and some concepts have two words to express them, one for women and one for men. Moreover, the terms used by men are generally loanwords from Carib while those used by women are Arawak.

The Garifuna language was declared a Masterpiece of the Oral and Intangible Heritage of Humanity in 2008 along with Garifuna music and dance.

== Distribution ==
Garifuna is spoken in Central America, especially in Honduras (146,000 speakers), but also in Guatemala (20,000 speakers), Belize (14,100 speakers), Nicaragua (2,600 speakers), and the US, particularly in New York City, where it is spoken in Queens, Brooklyn and the Bronx, and in Houston, which has had a community of Central Americans since the 1980s.The first feature film in the Garifuna language, Garifuna in Peril, was released in 2012.

== Sociolinguistic history ==
The Garinagu (singular Garifuna) are a mix of West/Central African, Arawak, and Kalinago ancestry. Though they were captives removed from their homelands, these people were never documented as slaves. The two prevailing theories are that they were the survivors of two recorded shipwrecks or they somehow took over the ship on which they came. The more Western and Central African-looking people were deported by the British from Saint Vincent to islands in the Bay of Honduras in 1796.

In the 16th century, Cariban peoples expanded into the Lesser Antilles. There they killed or displaced, and also mixed with the Arawak peoples who already inhabited the islands. The resulting language—Kalhíphona or Island Carib—was Kalinago in name but largely Arawak in substance. The Kalinago male conquerors took Arawak women as wives, and the latter passed on their own language on to the children. For a time, Arawak was spoken by women and children and Kalinago by adult men, but as each generation of Kalinago-Arawak boys reached adulthood, they acquired less Kalinago until only basic vocabulary and a few grammatical elements were left. That form of Kalinago became extinct in the Lesser Antilles in the 1920s, but it survives as Garífuna, or "Black Carib," in Central America. The gender distinction has dwindled to only a handful of words. Dominica is the only island in the eastern Caribbean to retain some of its Indigenous population, descendants of the Kalinago people, about 3,000 of whom live on the island's east coast.

The Kalinago people (Island Caribs), who gave their name to the Caribbean, once lived throughout the Lesser Antilles, and although their language is now extinct there, ethnic Kalinago still live on Dominica, Trinidad, Saint Lucia, and Saint Vincent. The Kalinago had conquered the previous population of the islands, Arawakan peoples like the Taino and Palikur peoples. During the conquest, which was conducted primarily by men, the Kalinago took Arawakan women for wives. Children were raised by their mothers speaking Arawak, but as boys came of age, their fathers taught them Kalinago, a language still spoken in mainland South America.

Descriptions of Kalinago people in the 17th century missionaries from Europe record the use of two languages: Kalinago as spoken by the men, and Arawak as spoken by the women. It is conjectured that the males retained the core Kalinago vocabulary while the grammatical structure of their language mirrored that or Arawak. As such, Kalinago as spoken by males is considered either a mixed language or a relexified language. The West African influence in Garifuna is limited to a handful of loanwords and perhaps intonation. Contrary to what some believe, there is no influence from "African phonetics" as there is no such thing as a singular African phonetic system as languages in West Africa and Africa in general have extremely diverse phoneme inventories. The distinction between Garifuna and the Kalinago language can be explained by simple evolution due to the separation of the Garifuna being sent to Central America.

=== Vocabulary ===
The vocabulary of Garifuna is composed as follows.

1. Arawakan (Igneri) (45.0%)
2. Kalinago (Kallínagu) (25.0%)
3. French (15.0%)
4. English (10.0%)
5. Spanish or English technical terms (5.00%)

There are also a few words from African languages.

=== Comparison to Kalinago ===
Meaning	Garifuna	Kalinago
man	wügüri	wokyry
woman	würi	woryi
European	baranagüle	paranakyry (one from the sea, parana)
good	irufunti (in older texts, the f was a p)	iru'pa
anger/hate	yeregu	areku
weapon/whip	arabai	urapa
garden	mainabu (in older texts, maina)	maina
small vessel	guriara	kurijara
bird	dunuru (in older texts, tonolou)	tonoro
housefly	were-were	werewere
tree	wewe	wewe
lizard/iguana	wayamaga	wajamaka
star	waruguma	arukuma
sun	weyu	weju
rain	gunubu (in older texts, konobou)	konopo
wind	bebeidi (in older texts bebeité)	pepeito
fire	watu	wa'to
mountain	wübü	wypy
water, river	duna (in older texts tona)	tuna
sea	barana	parana
sand	sagoun (in older texts saccao)	sakau
path	üma	oma
stone	dübü	topu
island	ubouhu (in earlier texts, oubao)	pa'wu

=== Gender differences ===
Relatively few examples of diglossia remain in common speech. It is possible for men and women to use different words for the same concept such as au ~ nugía for the pronoun "I", but most such words are rare and often not currently used by men. For example, there are distinct Kalinago and Arawak words for "man" and "women", four words altogether, but often the generic terms mútu or gürígiya "person" are used by both men and women and for both men and women, with grammatical gender agreement on a verb, adjective, or demonstrative, distinguishing whether these words refer to a man or to a woman (mútu lé "the man", mútu tó "the woman").

There remains, however, a diglossic distinction in the grammatical gender of a few inanimate nouns, with abstract words generally being considered grammatically feminine by men and grammatically masculine by women. Thus, the word wéyu may mean either concrete "sun" or abstract "day"; with the meaning of "day", most men use feminine agreement, at least in conservative speech, while women use masculine agreement. The equivalent of the abstract impersonal pronoun in phrases like "it is necessary" is also masculine for women but feminine in conservative male speech.

== Phonology ==
Consonants
		Labial	Alveolar	Palatal	Velar	Glottal
Nasal		m	n	ɲ		
Plosive	voiceless	p	t	tʃ	k	
Plosive	voiced	b	d		ɡ	
Fricative		f	s			h
Approximant		w	l	j		
Tap/Flap			ɾ			

Vowels
	Front	Central	Back
Close	i	ɨ	u
Mid	ɛ~e		ɔ~o
Open	a		

[o] and [e] are allophones of /ɔ/ and /ɛ/ respectively.

== Grammar ==
=== Morphology ===
Garifuna is an agglutinative language.

==== Personal pronouns ====
Independent personal pronouns in Garifuna distinguish the social gender of the speaker:

		singular		plural
		male speaker	female speaker	plural
1st person		au	nugía	wagía
2nd person		amürü	bugía	hugía
3rd person	masculine	ligía		hagía
3rd person	feminine	tuguya		hagía

The forms au and amürü are of Cariban origin, and the others are of Arawakan origin.

==== Number ====
Garifuna distinguishes singular and plural numbers for some human nouns. The marking of in nouns is realized through suffixes:

- isáni "child" – isáni-gu "children"
- wügüri "man" – wügüri-ña "men"
- hiñaru "woman" – hiñáru-ñu "women"
- itu "sister" – ítu-nu "sisters"

The plural of Garífuna is Garínagu.

Plural animate nouns use animate plural agreement on verbs and other sentence elements. Inanimate nouns do not show plural agreement.

==== Possession ====
Possession on nouns is expressed by personal prefixes:

- ibágari "life"
- n-ibágari "my life"
- b-ibágari "your (singular) life"
- l-ibágari "his life"
- t-ibágari "her life"
- wa-bágari "our life"
- h-ibágari "your (plural) life"
- ha-bágari "their life"

==== Verb ====
For the Garifuna verb, the grammatical tense, grammatical aspect, grammatical mood, negation, and person (both subject and object) are expressed by affixes (mostly suffixes), partly supported by particles (second-position enclitics).

The paradigms of grammatical conjugation are numerous.

The conjugation of the verb alîha "to read" in the present continuous tense:

- n-alíha-ña "I am reading"
- b-alíha-ña "you (singular) are reading"
- l-alíha-ña "he is reading"
- t-alíha-ña "she is reading"
- wa-líha-ña "we are reading"
- h-alíha-ña "you (plural) are reading"
- ha-líha-ña "they are reading"

The conjugation of the verb alíha "to read" in the simple present/past tense:

- alíha-tina "I read"
- alíha-tibu "you (singular) read"
- alíha-ti "he reads"
- alíha-tu "she reads"
- alíha-tiwa "we read"
- alíha-tiü "you (plural) read"
- alíha-tiñu "they (masculine) read"
- alíha-tiña "they (feminine) read"

There are also some irregular verbs which use a different stem for these two conjugations — for instance, "eat" is éigi in the progressive sentences and hóu in the simple non-future tense.

=== Numerals ===
From "3" upwards, the numbers of Garifuna are exclusively of French origin and are based on the vigesimal system, which, in today's French, is apparent at "80":

- 1 = aban
- 2 = biñá, biama, bián
- 3 = ürüwa (< trois)
- 4 = gádürü (<quatre)
- 5 = seingü (<cinq)
- 6 = sisi (<six)
- 7 = sedü (<sept)
- 8 = widü (<huit)
- 9 = nefu (<neuf)
- 10 = dísi (<dix)
- 11 = únsu (<onze)
- 12 = dúsu (<douze)
- 13 = tareisi (<treize)
- 14 = katorsu (<quatorze)
- 15 = keinsi (<quinze)
- 16 = dísisi, disisisi (< "dix-six" →seize)
- 17 = dísedü, disisedü (<dix-sept)
- 18 = dísiwidü (<dix-huit)
- 19 = dísinefu (<dix-neuf)
- 20 = wein (<vingt)
- 30 = darandi (<trente)
- 40 = biama wein (< 2 x vingt → quarante)
- 50 = dimí san (< "demi cent" →cinquante)
- 60 = ürüwa wein (< "trois-vingt" → soixante)
- 70 = ürüwa wein dísi (< "trois-vingt-dix" → soixante-dix)
- 80 = gádürü wein (<quatre-vingt)
- 90 = gádürü wein dîsi (<quatre-vingt-dix)
- 100 = san (<cent)
- 1,000 = milu (<mil)
- 1,000,000 = míñonu (< English million?)

The reason for the use of French borrowings rather than Carib or Arawak terms is unclear, but may have to do with their succinctness, as numbers in indigenous American languages, especially those above ten, tend to be longer and more cumbersome.

=== Syntax ===
The word order is verb–subject–object (VSO, fixed).
