= Garifuna =

Afro-Indigenous ethnicity in Central America

Garinagu
Garínagu
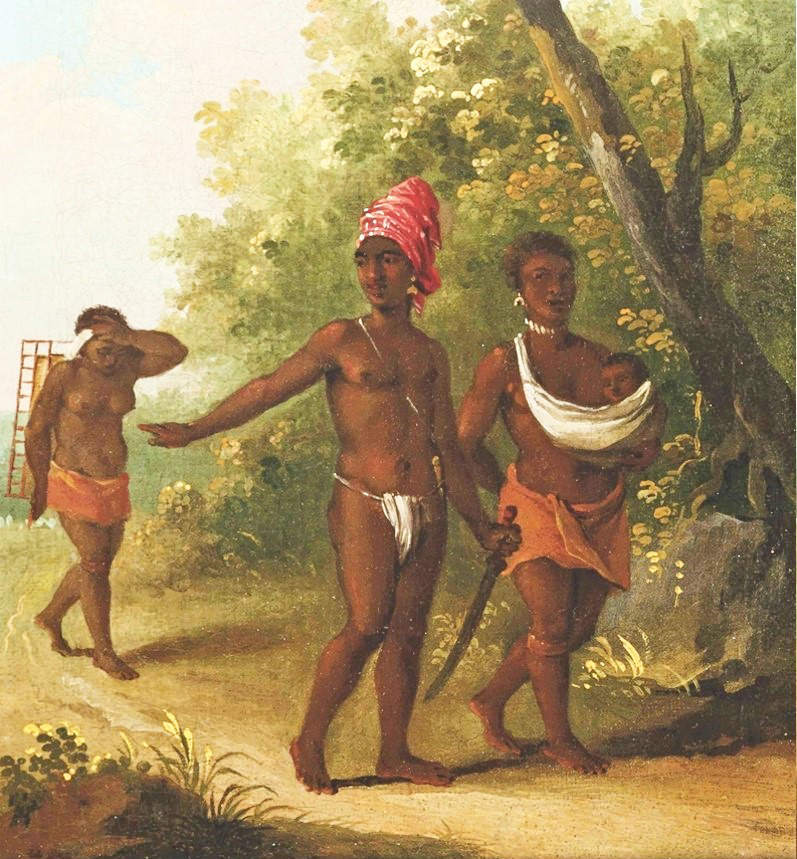
- Garifuna family, 1773 painting

Total population
- c. 400,000 (2011)

Regions with significant populations
- Honduras: 200,000 (2003)
- United States: c. 200,000 (2011)
- Belize: 15,000 (2003)
- Guatemala: 5,000 (2003)
- Nicaragua: 2,000 (2003)
- (Saint Vincent and the Grenadines) Saint Vincent: 1,100–2,000 (1984)

Languages
- Garifuna, Vincentian Creole, Spanish, Belizean Creole, English

Religion
- Primarily Roman Catholic and minorities of other Christian denominations.

Related ethnic groups
- Pardo, Kalinago, Afro-Caribbean people, Afro-Latin Americans, Taíno, Lokono, Wayuu, Arawak

The Garifuna people (/ˌɡɑːriːˈfuːnə/ GAR-ee-FOO-nə or Spanish pronunciation: [ɡa'ɾifuna]; pl. Garínagu in Garifuna) (Note: also known as Central American Island Caribs; formerly known as Caribs, Black Caribs, or Island Caribs until the late 1970s.) are an Afro-Indigenous people of mixed free African and Amerindian ancestry who originated in the Caribbean island of Saint Vincent and traditionally speak Garifuna, an Arawakan language.

The Garifuna are the descendants of Indigenous Arawak and Kalinago (Island Carib) people, and Afro-Caribbean people. The founding population of the Central American diaspora, estimated at 2,500 to 5,000 persons, were transplanted to Roatán from Saint Vincent, which was known to the Garinagu as Yurumein, in the Windward Islands of the Lesser Antilles. Small Garifuna communities still live in Saint Vincent and the Grenadines. The Garifuna diaspora abroad includes communities in Nicaragua, Honduras, Guatemala, Belize, and the United States.

== Name ==
In the Garifuna language, the endonym Garínagu refers to the people as a whole and the term Garífuna refers to an individual person, the culture, and the language. The terms Garífuna and Garínagu originated as African modifications of the Kalinago terms Karifuna and Kalinago respectively. The terms may have been used by the Garifuna to refer to themselves as early as the mid-17th century.

The Garifuna were historically known by the exonyms Caribs, Black Caribs, and Island Caribs. European explorers began to use the term Black Caribs in the 17th century. In the 18th century, English accounts used the terms Black Caribs and Yellow or Red Caribs to differentiate, with some ambiguity, two groups with a similar culture by their skin color. The British colonial use of the term Black Carib, particularly in William Young's Account of the Black Charaibs (1795), has been described in modern historiography as framing the majority of the Indigenous St. Vincent population as "mere interlopers from Africa" who lacked claims to land possession in St. Vincent.

== History ==
=== Carib background ===
The Carib people migrated from South America to the Caribbean circa 1200, according to carbon dating of artifacts. According to Taíno testimonies, the Kalinago largely displaced, exterminated and assimilated the Taíno who were resident on the islands at the time, as well as the earlier Igneri.

=== 17th century ===
The French missionary Raymond Breton arrived in the Lesser Antilles in 1635, and lived in Guadeloupe and Dominica until 1653. He took ethnographic and linguistic notes on the native peoples of these islands, including St. Vincent, which he visited briefly.

In 1635 the Carib were overwhelmed by French forces led by the adventurer Pierre Belain d'Esnambuc and his nephew Jacques Dyel du Parquet. Cardinal Richelieu of France gave the island to the Compagnie de Saint-Christophe, in which he was a shareholder. Later the company was reorganized as the Compagnie des Îles de l'Amérique. The French colonists imposed French Law on the inhabitants, and Jesuit missionaries arrived to convert them to the Catholic Church.

Because the Carib people resisted working as laborers to build and maintain the sugar and cocoa plantations which the French began to develop in the Caribbean, in 1636, Louis XIII proclaimed La Traité des Noirs. This authorized the capture and purchase of enslaved people from sub-Saharan Africa and their transportation as labor to Martinique and other parts of the French West Indies.

In 1650, the company liquidated, selling Martinique to Jacques Dyel du Parquet, who became governor. He held this position until his death in 1658. His widow Mme. du Parquet took over control of the island from France. As more French colonists arrived, they were attracted to the fertile area known as Cabesterre (leeward side). The French had pushed the remaining Carib people to this northeastern coast and the Caravalle Peninsula, but the colonists wanted the additional land. The Jesuits and the Dominicans agreed that whichever order arrived there first, would get all future parishes in that part of the island. The Jesuits came by sea and the Dominicans by land, with the Dominicans ultimately prevailing.

When the Carib revolted against French rule in 1660, Governor Charles Houël du Petit Pré retaliated with war against them. Many were killed; those who survived were taken captive and expelled from the island. On Martinique, the French colonists signed a peace treaty with the few remaining Carib. Some Carib had fled to Dominica and Saint Vincent, where the French agreed to leave them at peace.

==== William Young's Report on St. Vincent ====
After the arrival of the English to St. Vincent in 1667, English officer John Scott wrote a report for the English Crown noting that St. Vincent was populated by Caribs and a small number of Africans from shipwrecked Spanish vessels. Later, in 1795, the British governor of St. Vincent, William Young, noted in his report to the British Crown that the island had populations of Africans who arrived after the wreck of two Spanish slave ships near St. Vincent in 1635. These ships were bound for the West Indies (Bahamas and Antilles).

According to Young's report, the Africans aboard the shipwrecked vessels, largely from the Ibibio ethnic group of modern-day Nigeria, survived the wreck and reached the island, living independently. Contrary to some historical accounts, these Africans were never enslaved and were not captured by the Caribs. Instead, they formed independent communities that gradually integrated with Indigenous peoples of the island. Over time, these Afro-Indigenous communities developed into the Garifuna people, a distinct cultural group with a unique language, traditions, and identity.

==== Modern historiography ====
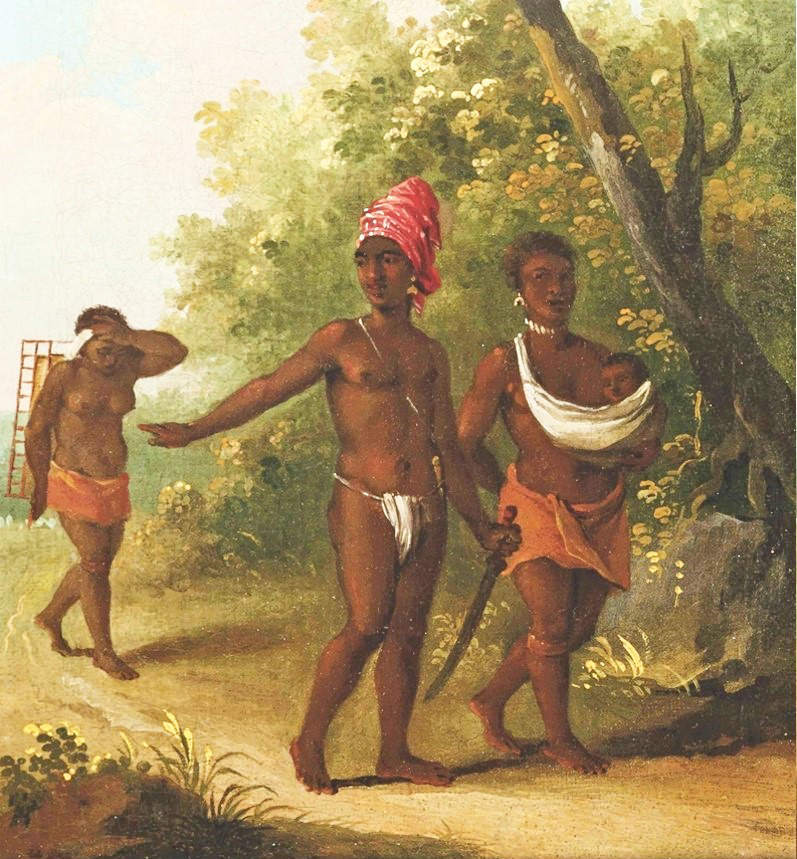
Black Carib family in Saint Vincent

Several modern researchers have rejected the theory espoused by Young. According to them, most of the enslaved people who arrived in Saint Vincent actually came from other Caribbean islands, and had settled in Saint Vincent in order to escape slavery, therefore Maroons came from plantations on nearby islands. Although most of the enslaved people came from Barbados (most of the enslaved people of this island were from present-day Nigeria and Ghana), but they also came from places such as St. Lucia (where enslaved people likely came from what is now Senegal, Nigeria, Angola) and Grenada (where there were many enslaved people from Guinea, Sierra Leone, Nigeria, Angola, Kongo and Ghana). The Bajans and Saint Lucians arrived on the island before 1735. Later, after 1775, most of the enslaved people who arrived from other islands were Saint Lucians and Grenadians. After arriving on the island, they were taken in by the Caribs, who offered them protection, assisted them and, eventually mixed with them.

In addition to the African refugees, the Caribs captured enslaved people from neighboring islands (although they also had white people and their fellow Caribs as enslaved people), while they were fighting against the British and the French. Many of the captured enslaved people were integrated into their communities (this also occurred in islands such as Dominica). After the African rebellion against the Caribs, and their escape to the mountains, over time, according to Itarala, Africans would come down from the mountains to have sexual intercourse with Amerindian women - perhaps because most Africans were men - or to search for other kinds of food. The sexual activity did not necessarily lead to marriage. On the other hand, if the Maroons abducted Arauaco-Caribbean women or married them, is another of the contradictions between the French documents and the oral history of the Garinagu. Andrade Coelho states that "...whatever the case, the Caribs never consented to give their daughters in marriage to blacks". Conversely, Sebastian R. Cayetano argues that "Africans were married with women Caribs of the islands, giving birth to the Garifuna". According to Charles Gullick some Caribs mixed peacefully with the Maroons and some not, creating two factions, that of the Black Caribs and that of the Yellow Caribs, who fought on more than one occasion in the late seventeenth and early eighteenth centuries. According to Itarala, many intermarried between Indigenous and African people, which was that which caused the origin of the Black Caribs.

=== 18th century ===
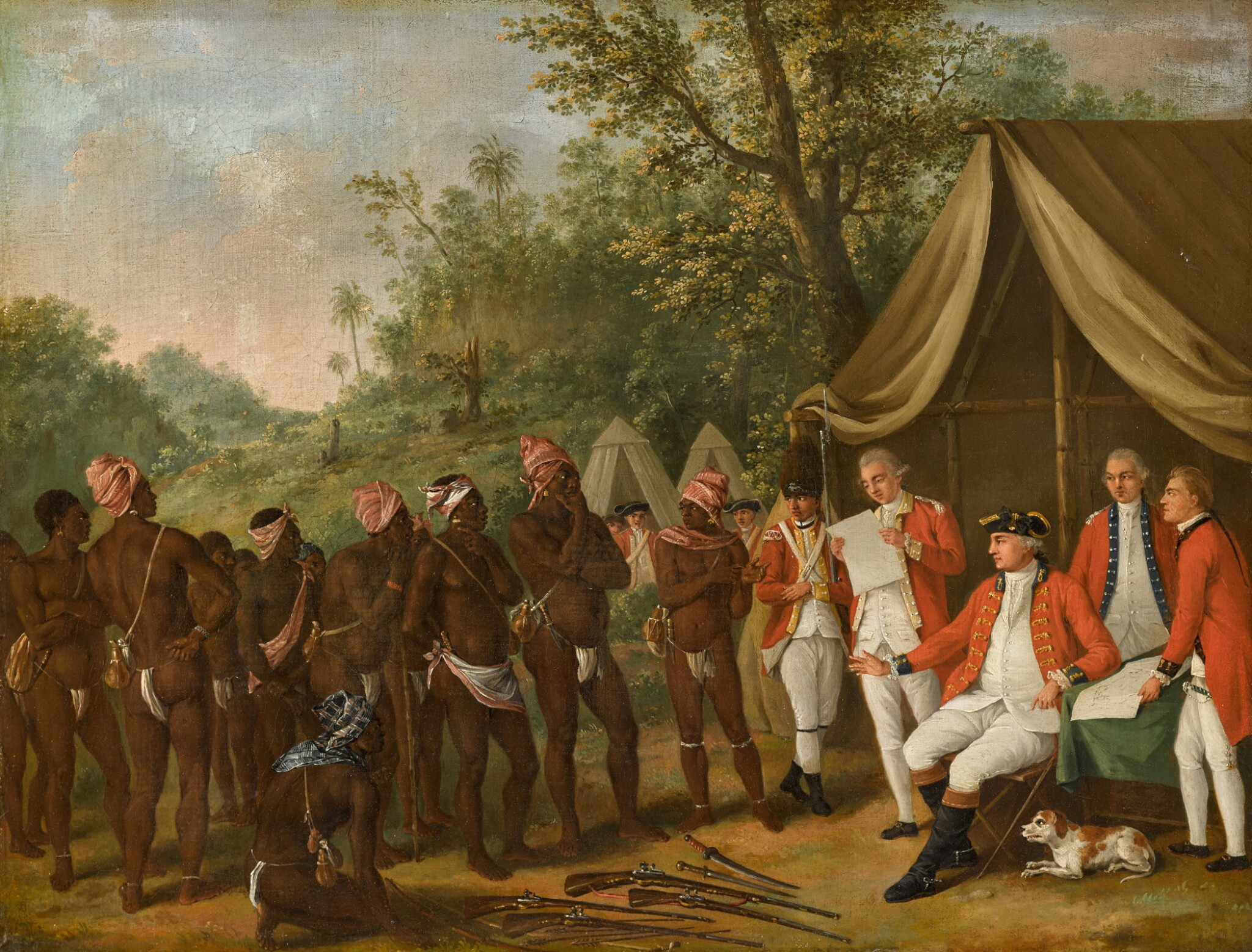
Depiction of the 1773 treaty negotiations between the British and the Black Caribs

Britain and France both made conflicting claims on Saint Vincent from the late seventeenth century onward. French pioneers began informally cultivating plots on the island around 1710. In 1719 the governor of the French colony of Martinique sent a military force to occupy it, but was repulsed by the Carib inhabitants. A British attempt in 1723 was likewise repelled. In 1748, Britain and France agreed to put aside their claims and declared Saint Vincent to be a neutral island, under no European sovereignty. Throughout this period, however, unofficial, mostly French settlement took place on the island, especially on the Leeward side. African escapees continued to reach Saint Vincent, and a mixed-race population developed through unions with the Carib.

In 1763 by the Treaty of Paris, Britain gained control over Saint Vincent following its defeat of France in the Seven Years' War, fought in Europe, Asia and North America. It also took over all French territory in North America east of the Mississippi River. Through the rest of the century, the Carib-African natives mounted a series of Carib Wars, which were encouraged and supported by the French.

==== Carib wars ====
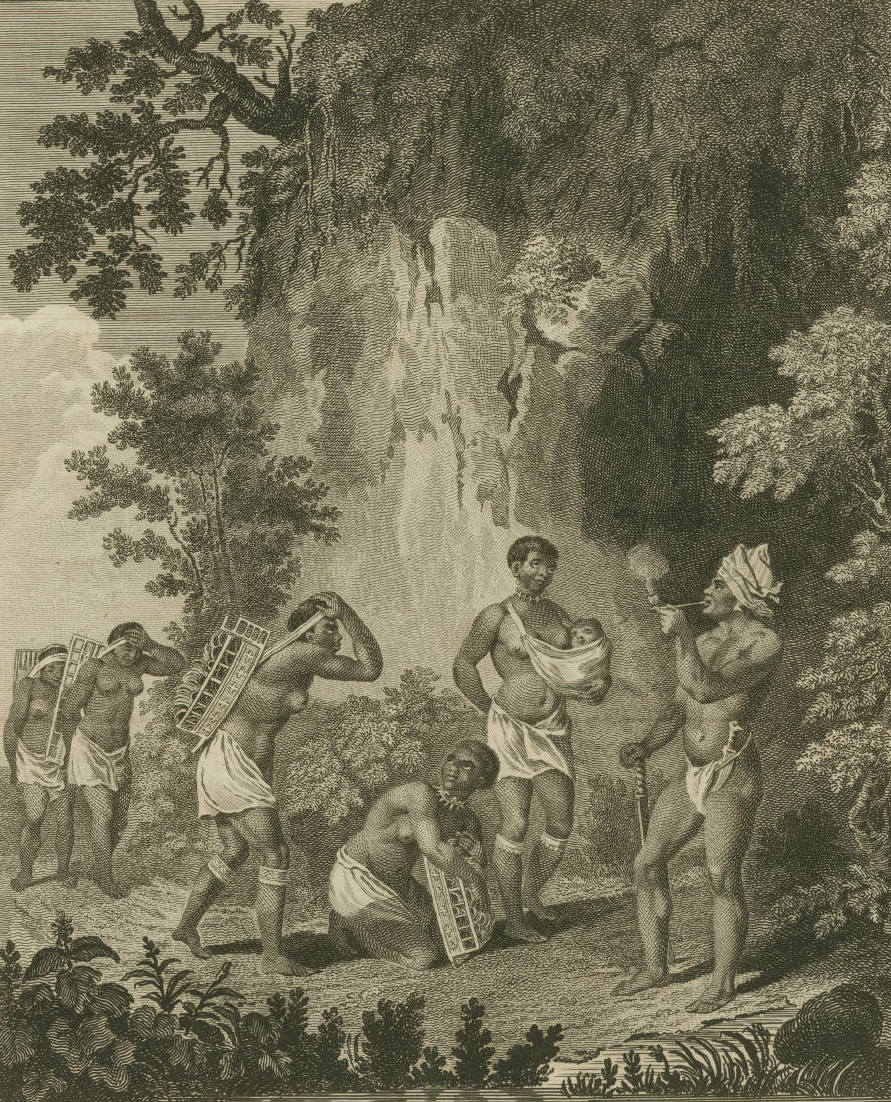
Joseph Chatoyer, the chief of the Black Caribs in St. Vincent, in an 1801 engraving.

When in 1627 the English began to claim the St. Vincent island, they opposed the French settlements (which had started around 1610 by cultivating plots) and its partnerships with the Caribs. In 1763 by the Treaty of Paris, Britain gained control over Saint Vincent. Over time, tensions began to arise between the Caribs and the Europeans. The governor of the English part of the island, William Young, complained that the Black Caribs had the best land and they had no right to live there. Moreover, the friendship of the French settlers with the Black Caribs, drove them, even though they had also tried to stay with San Vicente, tried to support them in their struggle. All this caused the "War Caribbean". The First Carib War began in 1769. Led primarily by Black Carib chieftain Joseph Chatoyer, the Caribs successfully defended the windward side of the island against a military survey expedition in 1769, and rebuffed repeated demands that they sell their land to representatives of the British colonial government. The effective defense of the Caribs, the British ignorance of the region and London opposition to the war made this be halted. With military matters at a stalemate, a peace agreement was signed in 1773 that delineated boundaries between British and Carib areas of the island. The treaty delimited the area inhabited by the Caribs, and demanded repayment of the British and French plantations of runaway enslaved people who took refuge in St. Vincent. This last clause, and the prohibition of trade with neighbouring islands, so little endeared the Caribs. Three years later, the French supported American independence (1776–1783); the Caribs aligned against the British. Apparently, in 1779 the Caribs inspired such terror to the British that surrender to the French was preferable than facing the Caribs in battle.

Later, in 1795, the Caribs again rebelled against British control of the island, causing the Second Carib War. Despite the odds being against them, the Caribs successfully gained control of most of the island except for the immediate area around Kingstown, which was saved from direct assault on several occasions by the timely arrival of British reinforcements. British efforts to penetrate and control the interior and windward areas of the island were repeatedly frustrated by incompetence, disease, and effective Carib defences, which were eventually supplemented by the arrival of some French troops. A major military expedition by General Ralph Abercromby was eventually successful in defeating the Carib opposition in 1796.

After the war was concluded and the Caribs surrendered, the British authorities decided to deport the Caribs of St. Vincent. This was done to avoid the Caribs causing more slave revolts in St. Vincent. In 1797, the Caribs with African features were chosen to be deported as they were considered the cause of the revolt, and originally exported to Jamaica, and then they were transported to the island of Roatan in Honduras. Meanwhile, the Black Caribs with higher Amerindian traits were allowed to remain on the island. More than 5,000 Black Caribs were deported, but when the deportees landed on Roatan on April 12, 1797, only about 2,500 had survived the trip to the islands. After settling in the Honduras, they expanded along the Caribbean coast of Central America, coming to Belize and Guatemala to the north, and the south to Nicaragua. Over time, the Black Caribs would denominate in the mainland of Central America as "Garifuna".

=== 19th century ===
Large-scale sugar production and chattel slavery were not established on Saint Vincent until the British assumed control. As the United Kingdom abolished slavery in 1833, it operated it for roughly a generation on the island, creating a legacy different from on other Caribbean islands. Elsewhere, slavery had been institutionalized for much longer.

== Language ==
The Garifuna people speak Garifuna and Vincentian Creole.

The Garifuna language is an offshoot of the Kalinago language, and it is spoken in Honduras, Belize, Guatemala, and Nicaragua by the Garifuna people. It is an Arawakan language with French, English, Dutch, African, and Spanish influences, reflecting their long interaction with various colonial peoples. Garifuna has a vocabulary featuring some terms used by women and others used primarily by men. This may derive from historical Carib practices: in the colonial era, the Carib of both sexes spoke Island Carib. Men additionally used a distinct pidgin based on the unrelated Carib language of the mainland.

Almost all Garinagu are bilingual or multilingual. They generally speak the official languages of the countries they reside in, such as Spanish or English, most commonly as a first language. Many also speak Garifuna, mostly as a cultural language, as a part of their families' heritage.

== Demographics ==
In 2011, Garifuna organisations in the United States estimated that the Garifuna population consisted of roughly 400,000 people, mostly living in Honduras and the United States.

=== Saint Vincent ===
In 1805, the remaining Garifuna in Morne Ronde on Saint Vincent numbered 16 men, 9 women, and 20 children, although others remained on the island in hiding after the deportations of 1797. The 1844 census of Saint Vincent listed 273 "Black Caribs". The 1960 census listed 1,265 "Black Caribs" in Saint Vincent. In 1984, anthropologist Michael Crawford estimated that 1,100–2,000 Garifuna resided in Saint Vincent.

=== Central America ===
By 1981, around 65,000 Garifuna were living in fifty-four fishing villages in Guatemala, Belize, and Nicaragua.

== Culture ==
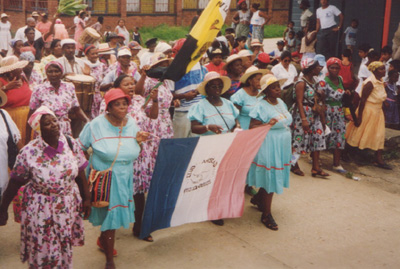
Garifuna parade on San Isidro Day, in Livingston (Guatemala)

In 2001 UNESCO proclaimed the language, dance, and music of the Garifuna as a Masterpiece of the Oral and Intangible Heritage of Humanity in Nicaragua, Honduras, and Belize. In 2005 the First Garifuna Summit was held in Corn Islands, Nicaragua, with the participation of the government of other Central American countries.

=== Music ===
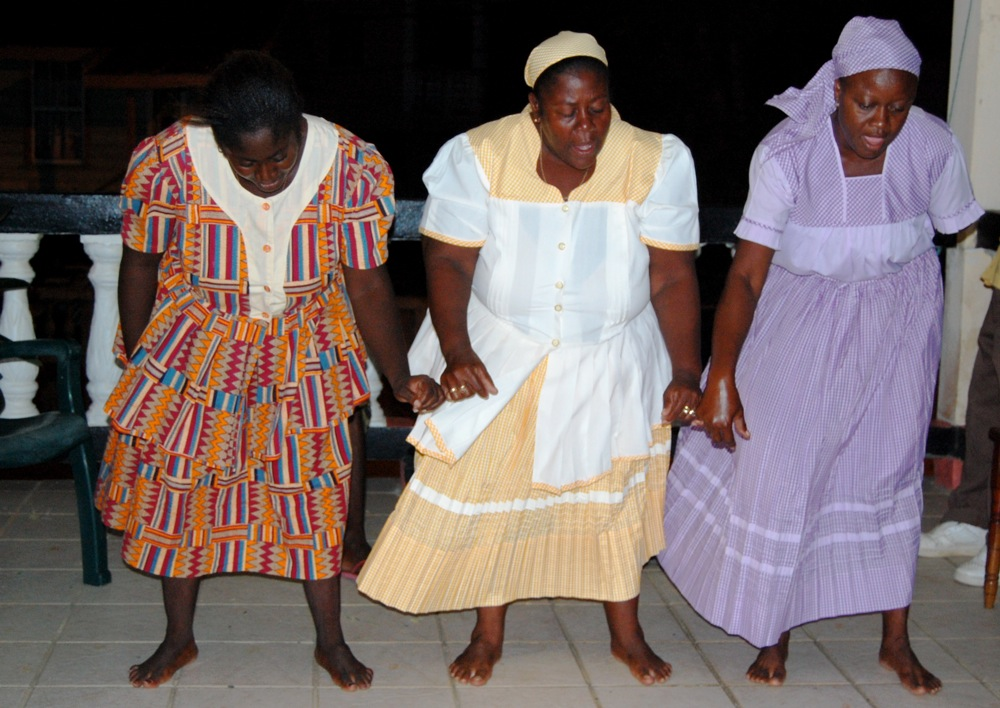
Traditional Garifuna dancers in Dangriga, Belize

In contemporary Belize there has been a resurgence of Garifuna music, popularized by musicians such as Andy Palacio, Mohobub Flores, and Aurelio Martinez. These musicians have taken many aspects from traditional Garifuna music forms and fused them with more modern sounds. Described as a mixture of punta rock and paranda, this music is exemplified in Andy Palacio's album Watina, and in Umalali: The Garifuna Women's Project, both of which were released on the Belizean record label, Stonetree Records. Canadian musician Danny Michel has also recorded an album, Black Birds Are Dancing Over Me, with a collective of Garifuna musicians.

Through traditional dance and music, musicians have come together to raise awareness of HIV/AIDS.

=== Spirituality ===
The majority of Garinagu have been Catholic since the community's historical encounters with the Jesuits, Dominicans, and various Catholic colonial powers (namely the French and Spanish) in the West Indies and Central America.

A complex set of practices exist in their traditional religion for individuals and groups to show respect for their ancestors and Bungiu (God) or Sunti Gabafu (All Powerful). A shaman known as a buyei is the head of all Garifuna traditional practices. The spiritual practices of the Garinagu have qualities similar to the voodoo (as the Europeans put it) rituals performed by other tribes of African descent. Mystical practices and participation such as in the Dugu ceremony and chugu are also widespread among Garifuna.

=== Au Bun, Amürü Nu ===
Au Bun, Amürü Nu is a Garinagu communal philosophy and moral principle meaning “I for you, you for me.” It embodies the Garinagu worldview of mutual care, reciprocity, and collective responsibility, reflecting the belief that personal and communal well-being are inseparable.

== Society ==
Gender roles within the Garifuna communities are significantly defined by the job opportunities available to everyone. The Garifuna people have relied on farming for a steady income in the past, but much of this land was taken by fruit companies in the 20th century. These companies were welcomed at first because the production helped bring an income to the local communities, but as business declined these large companies sold the land and it has become inhabited by mestizo farmers. Since this time the Garifuna people have been forced to travel and find jobs with foreign companies. The Garifuna people mainly rely on export businesses for steady jobs; however, women are highly discriminated against and are usually unable to get these jobs. Men generally work for foreign-owned companies collecting timber and chicle to be exported, or work as fishermen.

Garifuna people live in a matrilocal society, but the women are forced to rely on men for a steady income in order to support their families, because the few jobs that are available, housework and selling homemade goods, do not create enough of an income to survive on. Although women have power within their homes, they rely heavily on the income of their husbands.

Although men can be away at work for large amounts of time they still believe that there is a strong connection between men and their newborn sons. Garifunas believe that a baby boy and his father have a special bond, and they are attached spiritually. It is important for a son's father to take care of him, which means that he must give up some of his duties in order to spend time with his child. During this time women gain more responsibility and authority within the household.

== Genetic studies ==
According to a 1997 genetic study, the ancestry of the Garifuna people on average was estimated to be 76% African, 20% Arawak/Carib and 4% European. The admixture levels vary greatly between island and Central American Garinagu communities, with a 1983 study estimating genetic admixture percentages for the Garinagu of Stann Creek, Belize at 79.9% African, 2.7% European and 17.4% Amerindian, while estimating the genetic admixture percentages for Garinagu of Sandy Bay, St. Vincent at 41.1% African, 16.7% European and 42.2% Amerindian genetic ancestry.

=== African heritage ===
According to oral tradition and several scholars, the Garifuna trace their African ancestry to a number of West and Central African ethnic groups. These include the Efik (from present-day Nigeria and Cameroon), Igbo (Nigeria, Cameroon, Equatorial Guinea), Fon (primarily in Benin and Nigeria), Fante and Ashanti (from present-day Ghana), Yoruba (in modern Togo, Benin, and Nigeria), and Kongo (from the regions comprising the Republic of the Congo, Democratic Republic of the Congo, and Angola).

Many of these Africans are believed to have arrived on the island of Saint Vincent through shipwrecks or as escapees from slavery on neighboring Caribbean islands. Others may have been brought by the Island Caribs themselves or born free on Saint Vincent. These individuals integrated with the local Indigenous populations, primarily the Island Caribs (Kalinago) and Arawaks, forming a distinct Afro-Indigenous society.

Belizean anthropologist and Garifuna historian Sebastian R. Cayetano states that the African ancestors of the Garifuna were ethnically West African, "specifically of the Yoruba, Ibo [Igbo], and Ashanti tribes, in what is now Ghana, Nigeria, and Sierra Leone, to mention only a few."

French-Brazilian sociologist Roger Bastide noted that the northeastern region of Saint Vincent served as a refuge for free Africans who integrated into Carib society, particularly those of Yoruba, Fon, Fante-Ashanti, and Kongo origins.

This African ancestry was primarily introduced through men, while maternal lineages were largely Indigenous, as confirmed by mitochondrial DNA studies showing high frequencies of Native American haplogroups such as A2 and C1.

Historian Ruy Galvão de Andrade Coelho also observed that African individuals contributing to the formation of the Garifuna population came from Nigeria, the Gold Coast, Dahomey, the Congo region, and other areas of West Africa.

By the early 18th century, the population of Saint Vincent was already predominantly of African descent. Despite extensive cultural and familial blending between Africans and Indigenous Caribs, a distinct Indigenous group referred to by the British as "Red Caribs" continued to live alongside the Afro-Indigenous "Black Caribs" (Garifuna).

== Notable people ==
- Alberth Elis
- Boniek García
- Carlos Bernárdez
- Edwin Solano
- Marvin Avila
- Dionisia Amaya
- Theodore Aranda
- Rosita Baltazar
- Victor Bernardez
- Sofía Blanco
- Joseph Chatoyer
- Duvalle
- Osman Chavez
- Mirtha Colón
- Teofilo Colon
- Félix Crisanto
- Wilmer Crisanto
- Maynor Figueroa
- O.T. Genasis
- Abraham Laboriel
- Aurelio Martínez
- Bernard Martínez Valerio
- Paul Nabor
- Eugenio Dolmo Flores
- Tomás Róchez
- Rakeem Nuñez-Roches
- Paul Nabor
- Andy Palacio
- Joseph Palacio
- Jerry Palacios
- Johnny Palacios
- Wilson Palacios
- Teodoro Palacios Flores
- Guillermo Ramírez
- Thomas Vincent Ramos
- David Suazo
- Deiby Flores
- Édgar Álvarez
- Henry Figueroa
- Romell Quioto
- Jerry Bengtson
- Jorge Benguché

== See also ==
- Black Seminoles
- British Honduras
- Dangriga
- Garifuna in Peril
- Happy Land fire
- Lebeha Drumming Center
- Miskito people
- Obeah
- Punta
- Sambo Creek
- Zambo

== Bibliography ==
- Anderson, Mark. When Afro Becomes (like) Indigenous: Garifuna and Afro-Indigenous Politics in Honduras. Journal of Latin American and Caribbean Anthropology 12.2 (2007): 384–413. AnthroSource. Web. 20 January 2010.
- Breton, Raymond (1877) [1635]. Grammaire caraibe, composée par le p. Raymond Breton, suivie du Catéchisme caraibe. Bibliothèque linguistique américaine, no. 3 (1635 original MS. republication ed.). Paris: Maisonneuve. OCLC 8046575.
- Chernela, Janet M. Symbolic Inaction in Rituals of Gender and Procreation among the Garifuna (Black Caribs) of Honduras. Ethos 19.1 (1991): 52–67. AnthroSource. Web. 13 January 2010.
- Dzizzienyo, Anani, and Suzanne Oboler, eds. Neither Enemies Nor Friends: Latinos, Blacks, Afro-Latinos. 2005.
- Flores, Barbara A.T. (2001) Religious education and theological praxis in a context of colonization: Garifuna spirituality as a means of resistance. Ph.D. Dissertation, Garrett/Northwestern University, Evanston, Illinois. OCLC 47773227
- Franzone, Dorothy (1995) A Critical and Cultural Analysis of an African People in the Americas: Africanisms in the Garifuna Culture of Belize. PhD Thesis, Temple University. UMI Dissertation Services (151–152). OCLC 37128913
- Gonzalez, Nancie L. Solien (1988). The Sojourners of the Caribbean: Ethnogenesis and Ethnohistory of the Garifuna. Urbana: University of Illinois Press. ISBN 978-0-252-01453-6. OCLC 15519873.
- Gonzalez, Nancie L. Solien (1997). "The Garifuna of Central America". In Wilson, Samuel M. (ed.). The Indigenous People of the Caribbean. The Ripley P. Bullen series. Organized by the Virgin Islands Humanities Council. Gainesville: University Press of Florida. pp. 197–205. ISBN 978-0-8130-1531-6. OCLC 36817335.
- Griffin, Wendy. "The 21st Century Battle fought by Honduras Indigenous to know their history and maintain their identity," Honduras Weekly, reprinted by Latina Lista, November 7, 2013.
- Griffin, Wendy and Comité de Emergencia de Garifuna Honduras. San Pedro Sula: Comité de Emergencia de Garifuna Honduras, 2005.
- Griffith, Marie, and Darbara Dianne Savage, eds. Women and Religion in the African Diaspora: Knowledge, Power, and Performance. 2006.
- Herlihy, Laura Hobson. Sexual Magic and Money: Miskitu women's Strategies in Northern Honduras. Ethnology 46.2 (2006): 143–159. Web. 13 January 2010.
- Loveland, Christine A., and Frank O. Loveland, eds. Sex Roles and Social Change in Native Lower Central American Societies.
- McClaurin, Irma. Women of Belize: Gender and Change in Central America. 1996. New Brunswick: Rutgers UP, 2000.
- Palacio, Myrtle (1993). The First Primer on the People Called Garifuna. Belize City: Glessima Research & Services. OCLC 30746656.
- Sutherland, Anne (1998). The Making of Belize: Globalization in the Margins. Westport, CT: Bergin & Garvey. ISBN 978-0-89789-579-8. OCLC 38024169.
- Taylor, Christopher (2012). The Black Carib Wars: Freedom, Survival, and the Making of the Garifuna. Jackson, MS: University Press of Mississippi.
