= Alphonso Dennie =

Vincentian educator (1928–2020)

Alphonso Dennie OBE

Minister of Education, Community Development and Youth Affairs
- In office 4 May 1972 – 18 September 1974
- Premier: James Fitz-Allen Mitchell
- Preceded by: Hudson K. Tannis
- Succeeded by: C. St. Clair Dacon

Member of Parliament for North Leeward
- In office 4 May 1972 – 18 September 1974
- Preceded by: Samuel E. Slater
- Succeeded by: John G. Thompson

Personal details
- Born: Alphonso Alpheus Dennie; 16 May 1928 Troumaca, Saint Vincent, British Windward Islands
- Died: 22 September 2020 (aged 92) Kingstown, Saint Vincent and the Grenadines
- Party: New Democratic Party; Mitchell/Sylvester Faction (1974-1975); People's Political Party (until 1974)
- Spouse: Stella Cottle (m. 1950; died 2012)
- Children: 11
- Education: Erdiston Teachers' Training College

Alphonso Alpheus Dennie OBE (16 May 1928 - 22 September 2020) was a Vincentian educator who served as the Minister of Education, Community Development and Youth Affairs from 4 May 1972 to 18 September 1974. Outside of politics, he was the headmaster of schools both in the country as well as in Barbados. He spent the latter part of his career as chairman of the national electricity company and as chairman of the philatelic bureau.

== Early life ==
Dennie was born in Troumaca on 16 May 1928, the fourth of eight children. He attended the Troumaca Government School, then became a supernumerary teacher at the same school. In 1950, he was transferred to Union Island and made the assistant headmaster. He later transferred back to Troumaca to become the headmaster. He also served as a headmaster of the Georgetown Government School, and taught at the Chateaubelair Methodist School.

After a second period as headmaster in Union Island (1962–1967), Dennie studied at Erdiston Teachers' Training College in Barbados (1967–1969). When he returned to Saint Vincent, he found a job managing the Oil Factory in Arnos Vale.

== Political career ==
Dennie first became interested in politics after attending Ebenezer Joshua's rallies. Before the 1967 election, the incumbent MP for North Leeward (since 1951) Samuel E. Slater defected to the Saint Vincent Labour Party (SVLP) from Joshua's People's Political Party (PPP). Dennie then secured the PPP nomination, but did not win against Slater. The SVLP fielded newcomer John G. Thompson for the 1972 election. This time, Dennie won.

Dennie was appointed Minister of Education, Community Development and Youth Affairs in the new government. In this office, he implemented educational reforms and reinstated teachers who had been fired by the previous administration for political activity. He also recruited Shake Keane to be the chair of the Carnival Celebration Committee.

For the 1974 election, Dennie joined a breakaway party led by Mitchell and several senior PPP members, but lost re-election to Thompson of the SVLP.

== Later career and retirement ==
After leaving the House of Assembly, Dennie and his family moved to Barbados in 1975. He taught at several schools, and also owned a restaurant. Upon his return to St. Vincent in 1984, Dennie became a manager at the national electricity company, St. Vincent Electricity Services, Ltd. (VINLEC).

Dennie also served as the executive chairman of St. Vincent Philatelic Services Ltd. During his tenure, foreign philatelic organizations criticized the agency for its prolific issuance of new stamps, often featuring popular culture figures like Madonna and The Flintstones. In a letter, Dennie defended the stamp issues as beneficial publicity for the country and philately in general:

" . . . We can only surmise that the intentions of your groups are self-serving and with utter disregard of what will happen to our beautiful hobby if your scheme to scare away new collectors succeeds. But, then, you must know that as a sovereign nation we claim the right to the policy of issuing our stamps and should not be dictated to in this regard."

Dennie retired in 2001, and later moved to Sion Hill Bay. He experienced vision loss in his eighties.

== Personal life ==
Dennie first saw his wife Stella (1929–2012) when she was a member of the choir at Troumaca Methodist Church, and then decided to join the choir himself. Dennie and Stella were married in Kingstown in 1950 and had seven children. Their oldest son and second child Olin J.B. Dennie (1953–2016) became a Lawyer who served as a Magistrate and also as Speaker of the House of Assembly (1984–1985).

== Death ==
Dennie died of natural causes on 22 September 2020 at Milton Cato Memorial Hospital in Kingstown.

Dennie was given a state funeral on 12 October. In the morning, he lay in state at the House of Assembly chamber; the viewing was attended by the Governor-General, the Prime Minister, the Leader of the Opposition, current and former MP's, the judiciary, visiting diplomats, and the general public. The service was held in the afternoon at the Methodist Church. Among the speakers at the service were Mike Findlay, former PM Sir James Fitz-Allen Mitchell, and St Clair Leacock.

== Honours ==
- Officer, Order of the British Empire (1997 New Year Honours)
