= List of political parties in Saint Vincent and the Grenadines =

Saint Vincent and the Grenadines has a two-party system, which means that there are two dominant political parties, with extreme difficulty for electoral success of smaller parties.

== Parties holding office ==
Party	Founded	Position	Ideology	Leader (since)	Slogan and Manifesto	House of Assembly
New Democratic Party (NDP)	1975	Centre-right	Conservatism; Pro-Commonwealth	Godwin Friday (November 2016)	"Let's get SVG working."	14 / 15
Unity Labour Party (ULP)	1994	Centre-left to left-wing	Democratic socialism; Agrarian socialism; Republicanism	Ralph Gonsalves (December 1998)	"Lifting SVG higher."	1 / 15

== Other parties ==
Name	Founded	Position	Ideology	Leader (since)
Saint Vincent and the Grenadines Green Party	2005	Left-wing	Green	Ivan O'Neal
United Progressive Party (UPP)	2020	Centre to centre-left	Progressivism	Mark J.N Doyle

== Historical parties ==
- Saint Vincent and the Grenadines Labour Party (1956–1994) - social democratic
- Movement for National Unity (until 1994)
- People's Political Party
- United People's Movement
- Democratic Republican Party
- National Reform Party
- Progressive Labour Party

== See also ==
- Politics of Saint Vincent and the Grenadines
- List of political parties by country
