= Yvonne Francis-Gibson =

Saint Vincent and the Grenadines politician (1931–2018)

Member of the House of Assembly of Saint Vincent and the Grenadines
- In office 1989–1998
- Constituency: West St. George

Personal details
- Born: Yvonne Christiana Harry; 26 March 1931
- Died: 7 July 2018 (aged 87) Fountain, Saint Vincent and the Grenadines
- Political party: New Democratic Party
- Spouse: Kelvile Gibson
- Children: 1
- Occupation: Politician; trade unionist; school teacher

Yvonne Christiana Francis-Gibson (née Harry; 26 March 1931 – 7 July 2018) was a Saint Vincent and the Grenadines politician and trade unionist. Originally working as a schoolteacher, she was also a labor organizer and was president of the SVG Teachers' Union. She was later elected New Democratic Party MP for West St. George in 1989 and later became Minister of Education, Women's Affairs and Culture, as well as Minister of Health and the Environment and of the Prime Minister's Office.

== Biography ==
Yvonne Christiana Harry was born on 26 March 1931 and educated at Lowmans Leeward Anglican School, Kingstown Methodist School, and St. Vincent Girls' High School, the latter of which she was a part-time student while teaching at primary school. She began working as a teacher starting in the mid-1940s and continued doing so for the next four decades, particularly at Kingstown Methodist School, St. Vincent Girls' High School, Lowmans Leeward Anglican School, Barrouallie Anglican School, Chateaubelair Methodist School, and Belmont Government School. She was head teacher of Brighton Methodist School from 1967 until 1980, and she worked at her alma mater Kingstown Methodist School from 1980 until 1985.

While working as a teacher, she began participating in trade union activism, and she was once detained in connection to her participation in the 1975 Saint Vincent and the Grenadines teachers' strike and at least once was struck with tear gas. In 1979, she became president of the SVG Teachers' Union, during which she organized protest activity against the Dread Bills in 1981. She served as the co-ordinator of the newly-created Women's Desk from 1985 until 1988; this role initially brought promise to better conditions for women than the Saint Vincent Labour Party did, but the Women's Desk itself was instead reportedly "subject to the whims and fancies of the government, and was unable to take a firm stand on behalf of women's issues".

She was elected to the House of Assembly of Saint Vincent and the Grenadines as New Democratic Party (NDP) MP for West St. George at the 1989 Vincentian general election. She became Minister of Education, Women's Affairs and Culture after her first victory. She was subsequently credited with granting maternity leave for the country's female teachers, as well as legalizing separate income tax returns for married women. After the 1994 Vincentian general election, she was appointed the country's first female Minister of Health and the Environment, and she also served as Minister of the Prime Minister's Office. In 1998, she retired from politics due to health illness.

Outside of trade unionism and women's rights, she also participated in anti-child abuse activism. Columnist Kenneth John unsuccessfully attempted to convince the national government to name the country's Resource Centre after her; it was instead named after educator Doris McKie.

She married Kelvile Gibson, who served as general secretary of the NDP and died before her. She also had one son, Leroy Ellsworth Harry. She briefly lived in Clare Valley, Saint Andrew Parish, where her house was said to be the "cradle" of the United People's Movement whose formation talks she was part of. (Note: By 2018, that house would later be owned by community organizer Nelcia Robinson-Hazell.)

Francis-Gibson died on 7 July 2018 in Fountain, where she lived at the time; she was 87. Kenneth John provided tribute to her after her death, voicing support for granting National Hero status to her, as did the NDP and the SVG Teachers' Union. Her funeral, set to take place at Kingstown Methodist Church, was held on 27 July. The Vincentian said that Francis-Gibson had made "a significant contribution to national development" and that she would "go down in history as an extremely vocal champion and activist against the social and political challenges that faced Vincentians".
