= 2015 Vincentian general election =

- 9 December 2015

15 of 23 seats in the House of Assembly 8 seats needed for a majority
- Registered: 89,527
- Turnout: 73.39% (▲11.06pp)
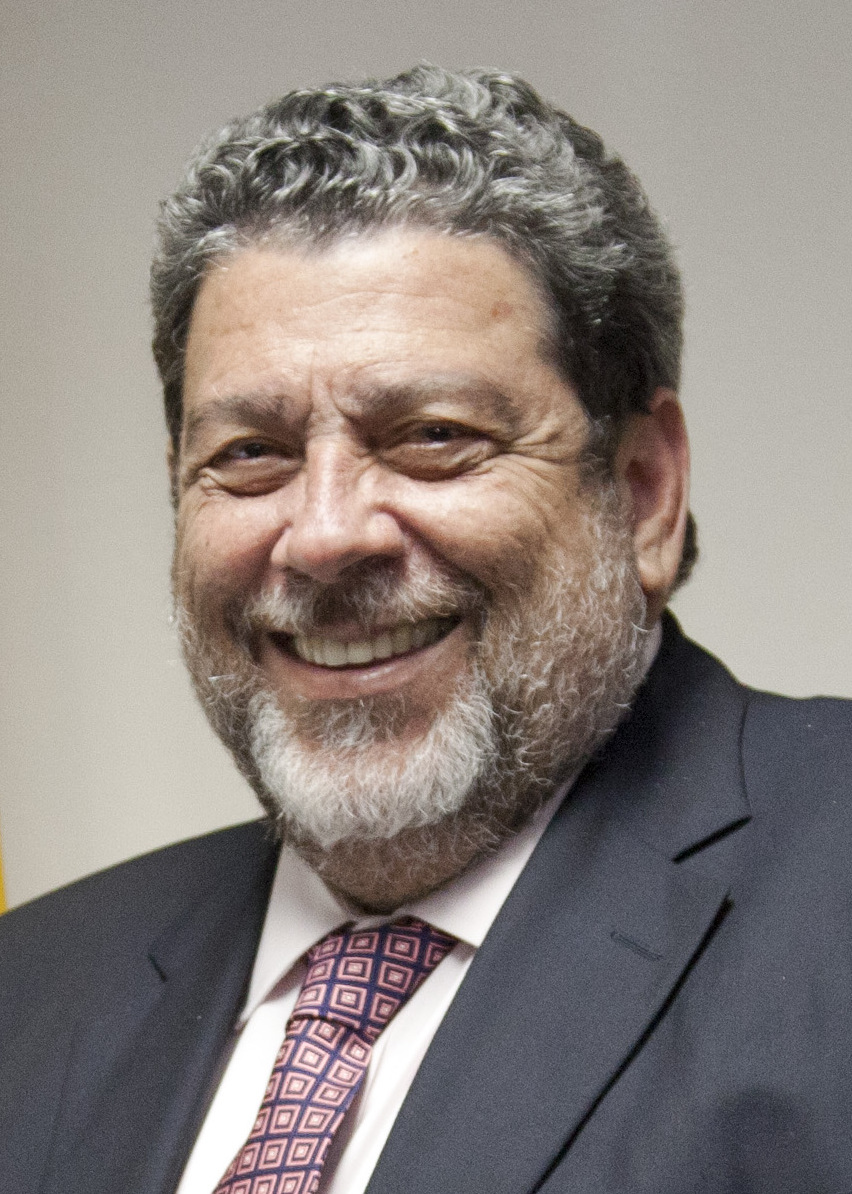

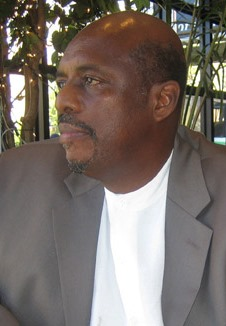
	First party	Second party
Leader	Ralph Gonsalves	Arnhim Eustace
Party	Unity Labour	New Democratic
Leader since	6 December 1998	27 October 2000
Leader's seat	North Central Windward	East Kingstown
Last election	51.11%, 8 seats	48.67%, 7 seats
Seats won	8	7
Seat change	Steady	Steady
Popular vote	34,246	31,027
Percentage	52.28%	47.37%
Swing	▲1.17pp	▼1.30pp
- Results by constituency
Prime Minister before election
Ralph Gonsalves
Unity Labour
Elected Prime Minister
Ralph Gonsalves
Unity Labour

General elections were held in Saint Vincent and the Grenadines on 9 December 2015. The result was a victory for the Unity Labour Party, which retained its one seat majority. However, the NDP has challenged the results in two constituencies, North Windward, and Central Leeward.

== Electoral system ==
The 15 elected members of the House of Assembly were elected in single-member constituencies using the first-past-the-post system.

== Campaign ==
A total of 43 candidates contested the elections. The two biggest parties were the incumbent Unity Labor Party of Prime Minister Ralph Gonsalves and the opposition New Democratic Party of Arnhim Eustace, both of which ran candidates in all the 15 constituencies. Smaller parties included the Green Party and the Democratic Republican Party, who only competed in seven and six constituencies respectively.

As 11,902 registered voters were first-time voters, both major parties looked to woo young voters. Gonsalves emphasised the importance of the youth as "solutions to the problem of our civilisation" rather than "problems to be solved." Eustace announced initiatives aimed at decreasing unemployment, including "proposals for youth, sports, and culture."

=== Marginal seats ===
Unity Labour Party			New Democratic Party		
Constituency		2010 majority	Constituency		2010 majority
1	South Leeward	2.47%	1	Central Leeward	2.27%
2	North Leeward	2.99%	2	East St. George	3.27%
3	Central Kingstown	4.87%	3	North Windward	3.83%
4	East Kingstown	5.95%	4	West St. George	5.46%
5	West Kingstown	6.77%	5	Marriaqua	7.93%
6	Southern Grenadines	16.01%	6	South Central Windward	8.75%
7	Northern Grenadines	36.82%	7	South Windward	11.74%
			8	North Central Windward	38.26%
Source: Caribbean Elections

== Conduct ==
The OAS sent an observer team. There were 227 polling stations, which opened between 07:00 and 17:00.

== Results ==
Party	Votes	%	Seats	+/–
Unity Labour Party	34,246	52.28	8	0
New Democratic Party	31,027	47.37	7	0
Democratic Republican Party	154	0.24	0	New
Green Party	77	0.12	0	0
Total	65,504	100.00	15	0
Valid votes	65,504	99.69		
Invalid/blank votes	202	0.31		
Total votes	65,706	100.00		
Registered voters/turnout	89,527	73.39		
Source: Electoral Office

=== Elected MPs ===
Constituency	Elected member	Party
Central Kingstown	St Clair Leacock	New Democratic Party
Central Leeward	Louis Straker	Unity Labour Party
East Kingstown	Arnhim Eustace	New Democratic Party
East St. George	Camillo Gonsalves	Unity Labour Party
Marriaqua	St. Clair Prince	Unity Labour Party
North Central Windward	Ralph Gonsalves	Unity Labour Party
North Leeward	Roland Mathews	New Democratic Party
North Windward	Montgomery Daniel	Unity Labour Party
Northern Grenadines	Godwin L. Friday	New Democratic Party
South Central Windward	Saboto Caesar	Unity Labour Party
South Leeward	Nigel Stephenson	New Democratic Party
South Windward	Frederick Stephenson	Unity Labour Party
Southern Grenadines	Terrance Ollivierre	New Democratic Party
West Kingstown	Daniel Cummings	New Democratic Party
West St. George	Cecil Mckie	Unity Labour Party
Source: I-Witness News

== Reactions ==
In reaction to the win Gonsalves said: "I am humbled and honoured that the people of St Vincent and the Grenadines embraced our bold vision for the future and rejected the politics of hate," he also called for national unity to address developmental challenges. However he added that there were issues in the constituencies of North Leeward and South Leeward and "we are also calling for an immediate recount to ensure that all the votes are counted in those constituencies. There are more rejected ballots than the margin and those ballots should be examined closely to determine the intent of the voters."

The NDP refused to concede the defeat according to inconsistencies in the Central Leeward constituency. A party statement read: "We of the New Democratic Party are confident that we have won the general elections based on figures received by our various polling agents. Our figures show that we won the Central Leeward seat by six votes, which means that we won the general elections by eight seats to seven." Leader of the opposition Arnhim Eustace, who won his seat against ULP candidate Luke Brown by fewer than 50 votes, added that there were many irregularities took place in his constituency of East Kingstown, including "illegal voting, and contradictory voters list to agents."
