= Fitzgerald Bramble =

St. Vincent and the Grenadines politician and footballer (b. 1967)

The Honourable Fitzgerald Bramble MP

Minister of Foreign Affairs, Foreign Trade, Foreign Investment and Diaspora Affairs
- Incumbent
- Assumed office 2 December 2025
- Prime Minister: Godwin Friday
- Preceded by: Frederick Stephenson

Member of Parliament for East Kingstown
- Incumbent
- Assumed office 30 November 2020
- Preceded by: Arnhim Eustace

Personal details
- Born: Dwight Fitzgerald Bramble; 27 October 1962 (age 64) Saint Vincent and the Grenadines
- Party: New Democratic Party
Association football career
- Position: Goalkeeper
Senior career*
Years	Team	Apps	(Gls)
1995–1996	Hotspurs		
International career
1992–2004	Saint Vincent and the Grenadines		
- * Club domestic league appearances and goals

Dwight Fitzgerald Bramble (born 27 October 1962) is a Vincentian politician, serving as Minister of Foreign Affairs, Foreign Trade, Foreign Investment and Diaspora Affairs since 2025 and Member of Parliament for East Kingstown since 2020. He is a former goalkeeper for the national football team.

== Early life ==
Bramble was born in Saint Vincent and the Grenadines on 27 October 1962. He earned a B.A. and an M.A. in Economics from Old Dominion University.

== Football ==
Bramble played for the Old Dominion Monarchs while in university. He was the team's goalkeeping leader in 1983, and a letter winner during 1983-1986.

Bramble played for the Saint Vincent and the Grenadines national football team between 1992 and 2004. He was goalkeeper for the squad that played in the 1995 Caribbean Cup as well as in the 1996 Gold Cup in the United States. He also took part in 1994 FIFA World Cup qualification and 1998 FIFA World Cup qualification. From 1995 to 1996, he played for Hotspurs FC.

== Government ==
Bramble worked at the Ministry of Finance, Planning and Economic Development, reaching the rank of Senior Projects Officer. In October 2000, he was appointed Deputy Chief of Mission at the Vincentian Embassy to the U.S. By 2005, he became the Director of the Organization of American States office in Suriname, a position he held until 2011. He later moved to Canada. After working as a lecturer at the University of Regina, he was hired as the economic development coordinator of the city of Estevan in 2017.

== Politics ==
Bramble was nominated as the New Democratic Party's candidate for East Kingstown in the 2020 general election. He would succeed retiring MP Arnhim Eustace, a former prime minister who had held the seat for the NDP since 1998. Bramble won against the Unity Labour Party's three-time candidate Luke Browne. Bramble and the other members of parliament were sworn in at the first session on 30 November 2020. Bramble was re-elected in the 2025 election and was made Minister of Foreign Affairs, Foreign Trade, Foreign Investment and Diaspora Affairs in the new NDP government.
