= 1979 Vincentian general election =

- 5 December 1979

13 of 21 seats in the House of Assembly 7 seats needed for a majority
- Registered: 52,073
- Turnout: 63.90% (▲0.66pp)

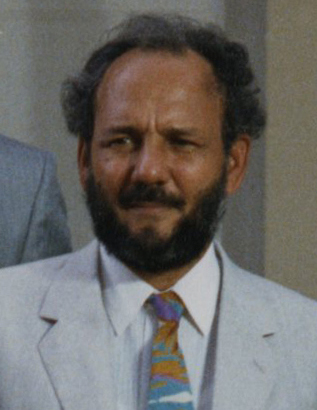
	First party	Second party
Leader	Milton Cato	James Mitchell
Party	SVLP	New Democratic
Last election	69.04%, 10 seats	–
Seats won	11	2
Seat change	▲1	New
Popular vote	17,876	9,022
Percentage	54.24%	27.38%
Swing	▼14.80pp	New
- Results by constituency
Prime Minister before election
Office created
Elected Prime Minister
Milton Cato
SVLP

General elections were held in Saint Vincent and the Grenadines on 5 December 1979. The result was a victory for the Saint Vincent Labour Party (SVLP), which won eleven of the thirteen seats. Voter turnout was 64%, up only slightly from 63% in 1974.

== Campaign ==
Fifty candidates contested the 13 seats from four parties. The SVLP led by Milton Cato, Prime Minister since 1974; the People's Political Party (PPP), the SVLP's traditional rival, headed by Ebenezer Joshua; the New Democratic Party, led by James Fitz-Allen Mitchell; and the United People's Movement of Ralph Gonsalves, which contested elections for the first time. All four groups presented a similar manifesto but ideologically the United People's Movement was oriented to the left much as the political groups which had recently come to power in Grenada and Saint Lucia. The SVLP (considered a moderate socialist party), the centrist New Democratic Party and the People's Political Party were oriented to the right.

== Results ==
On polling day, the SVLP obtained a clear victory as it captured 11 of the 13 seats. The other two seats went to New Democratic Party candidates although the NDP leader, James Mitchell, was himself defeated.

Party	Votes	%	Seats	+/–
Saint Vincent Labour Party	17,876	54.24	11	+1
New Democratic Party	9,022	27.38	2	New
United People's Movement	4,467	13.55	0	New
People's Political Party	1,492	4.53	0	–2
Independents	98	0.30	0	New
Total	32,955	100.00	13	0
Valid votes	32,955	99.04		
Invalid/blank votes	321	0.96		
Total votes	33,276	100.00		
Registered voters/turnout	52,073	63.90		
Source: Nohlen

=== By constituency ===
Constituency	Registered voters	Party										Votes			
Constituency	Registered voters	SVLP		NDP		UPM		PPP		Independents		Valid	Invalid	Total	Turnout
Constituency	Registered voters	Votes	%	Votes	%	Votes	%	Votes	%	Votes	%	Valid	Invalid	Total	Turnout
North Windward	2,943	718	35.5	566	28.0	268	13.3	362	17.9	98	4.9	2,012	8	2,020	68.6
North Central Windward	4,582	1,725	56.1	633	20.6	582	18.9	115	3.7	–	–	3,055	19	3,074	67.1
South Central Windward	3,569	1,006	44.1	658	28.8	383	16.8	226	9.9	–	–	2,273	10	2,283	64.0
South Windward	3,475	1,391	59.5	611	26.1	305	13.0	–	–	–	–	2,307	32	2,339	67.3
Marriaqua	3,527	1,807	82.1	229	10.4	135	6.1	12	0.5	–	–	2,183	18	2,201	62.4
East St. George	4,350	1,962	74.0	416	15.7	237	8.9	15	0.6	–	–	2,630	22	2,652	61.0
West St. George	4,815	1,608	55.7	322	11.2	419	14.5	510	17.7	–	–	2,859	26	2,885	59.9
East Kingstown	4,425	1,369	56.3	478	19.7	468	19.3	81	3.3	–	–	2,396	34	2,430	54.9
West Kingstown	4,404	1,586	63.4	514	20.5	379	15.1	–	–	–	–	2,479	24	2,503	56.8
South Leeward	4,740	1,678	51.6	989	30.4	491	15.1	28	0.9	–	–	3,186	63	3,249	68.5
Central Leeward	3,160	1,360	60.6	291	13.0	553	24.7	22	1.0	–	–	2,226	17	2,243	71.0
North Leeward	4,253	1,384	44.5	1,448	46.6	247	7.9	15	0.5	–	–	3,094	16	3,110	73.1
Grenadines	3,830	282	12.3	1,867	81.6	–	–	106	4.6	–	–	2,255	32	2,287	59.7
Total	52,073	17,876	54.2	9,022	27.4	4,467	13.6	1,492	4.5	98	0.3	32,955	321	33,276	63.9

Seats, of total, by party
1. SVLP (84.6%)
2. NDP (15.6%)
Votes, of total, by party
1. SVLP (54.2%)
2. NDP (27.4%)
3. PPP (4.50%)
4. UPM (13.6%)
5. Independents (0.30%)
