= Ivy Joshua =

Saint Vincent and the Grenadines politician and trade unionist

- from Ebony, October 1967
- Born: Ivy Inez McQueen; 25 December 1924; Grenada
- Died: 1992 (aged 67–68); Kingstown, Saint Vincent, Saint Vincent and the Grenadines
- Other names: Ivy Inez Joshua
- Occupations: trade unionist, politician
- Years active: 1952–1979
- Known for: first woman parliamentarian in St. Vincent and the Grenadines

Ivy Inez Joshua (née McQueen; 25 December 1924 – 1992) was a Grenadian-born seamstress and politician, who was the first woman elected to serve in the Legislative Council of Saint Vincent and the Grenadines when universal suffrage was granted. Though she won her seat in six consecutive election cycles, with a substantial majority each time she ran, Joshua was often the target of politically-based inquiries and investigations. She served in the legislature from 1958 to 1979 and simultaneously on the Executive Council from 1960 when she was appointed as the Minister of Social Services. Joshua served from 1961 to 1964 and again from 1967 to 1972 as a Minister without portfolio, before being appointed as Parliamentary Secretary and later leader of the opposition.

== Early life ==
Ivy Inez McQueen was born on 25 December 1924 in Grenada to Cecile (née Neckles) McQueen. After receiving a basic education, she moved to Trinidad and Tobago, where she met Ebenezer Joshua. The couple relocated to British Guiana in 1943, where they were married before returning two years later to Trinidad to work as union organizers. Working in the trade union movement founded by Tubal Uriah Butler, the Joshuas were invited to return to Ebenezer's homeland, of Saint Vincent in March 1951 to assist George Hamilton Charles in organizing the laborers of the United Workers, Peasants and Rate Payers Union (UWPRPU).

== Career ==
Charles and Ebenezer Joshua formed the political arm of the UWPRPU, which they called the Eighth Army of Liberation. Ivy Joshua was one of the key organizers of the movement, mobilizing workers to participate in the first elections after universal suffrage was granted on the island in 1951. In addition, she worked as a seamstress and ran a store, which held a liquor license. After winning the election in a landslide victory, the Eighth Army dissolved over political differences.Ivy Joshua was instrumental in assisting Ebenezer with the formation of the Federated Industrial Allied Workers Union (FIAWU), representing agricultural and waterfront workers, in 1952. With the development of the FIAWU, a new political party, People’s Political Party, (PPP) was launched. Joshua walked from village to village with Ebenezer, presenting their plea for labor organization and decolonization. She also led strikes between 1951 and 1957 to gain recognition for the union and to improve the conditions of the workers, primarily in the sugar factories.

In 1954, the Joshuas' new party won three of the eight seats and in the following election, Joshua stood as a candidate in the elections, becoming one of the first women to contest an election. On 24 September 1957, Joshua was confirmed as the assembly member for the North Windward Electoral District of Saint Vincent, becoming the first woman to serve in the island's Legislative Council. As both she and her husband won seats in the election, they became the first couple in Saint Vincent and the Grenadines (and possibly the British West Indies) to hold office at the same time. Labor relations had cooled and there were no strikes between 1957 and 1961. Joshua was appointed as Minister of Social Services, overseeing education and housing in 1960. She was reelected for the same district in 1961, appointed as a Minister without portfolio and repeated the feat in 1964, winning by wide margins. In 1962, she was one of the leaders of the FIAWU strike over holiday pay at the Mt. Bentinck Sugar Factory, which eventually led to the closure of the plant.

Joshua was forced to resign her position in the cabinet in 1964, though she retained her legislative seat, when the Colonial Secretary, Duncan Sandys and George Thompson, MP of the House of Commons of the United Kingdom brought questions in the London Parliament over her handling of the Public Works Department. Though standard practice in the 1960s for ministers across the Caribbean to trade jobs in the public works department for political support, when Joshua tried to place her supporters, she was called before a commission of inquiry. She resigned, but was found guilty of irregularities and misuse of public funds. That same year, she and Ebenezer worked to resolve a labor dispute for the dockworkers who were members of FIAWU. Installation of a conveyor belt from the dock to the ships, had caused alarm over whether dockworkers would be discharged and the Joshuas were able to negotiate an agreement to protect the workers.

In 1966, Joshua was reelected with 82% of the vote. A petition was filed contesting the election by Milton Cato, of the Saint Vincent Labor Party, (SVLP), which had lost the election to Ebenezer Joshua's PPP by one vote. Cato alleged that Ivy Joshua was illiterate and without being able to read and write was incapable of understanding parliamentary procedure. Counter-charges were filed against SVLP member Levi Latham by Ebenezer Joshua, alleging he too was illiterate. Both Joshua and Latham were required to take literacy tests in October 1966. Most of the public saw the repeated attacks on Joshua as a witch-hunt by her political opponents and ironically Cato was later accused of corruption for trading votes for jobs, which he had berated Joshua for having done.

In 1969, Joshua was arrested along with five other people and charged with conspiring to set fire to the Public Works Department. The charges appeared to be politically motivated, as at the time Saint Vincent had just gained political autonomy, as one of the West Indies Associated States, though it would not gain full independence for another decade. The entire Caribbean region at the time was marked by unrest, with an increase in British military activity to suppress political upheaval. A British frigate was sent from Bermuda at the time of Joshua's arrest to try to reduce the tension. On the day of Joshua's trial, a mass protest was held, calling for new elections, with the demonstrators marching to the Kingstown Court House. Both of the Joshuas boycotted the statehood celebration in protest over the failure to call new elections once St. Vincent's status from colony changed.

The election of 1972 resulted in a tied vote with each of the parties receiving six seats. A unity government, with an independent, James Fitz-Allen Mitchell as Premier was formed and Joshua was appointed as the Parliamentary Secretary by the Governor Rupert Godfrey John. When the unity government fell apart in 1974, new elections were held and Joshua was again elected. She vehemently opposed forming another unity government and was appointed as leader of the opposition in February 1975. As her husband had also been reelected to his seat and agreed to cooperate in a unity government, it was the first time in Saint Vincent political history that a husband and wife served on opposing sides in Parliament.

Joshua won her seat in six consecutive elections, each time winning by a substantial majority, amid staunch opposition and politically-based attacks. Her first loss came in the 1979 election, when both she and Ebenezer lost their bids. In 1986, Joshua was recognized by the National Council of Women of SVG for her pioneering role in politics and as an advocate for the working class.

Ivy and Ebenezer Joshua were members of the Church of Jesus Christ of Latter-day Saints.

== Death and legacy ==
Joshua died in 1992, a year after Ebenezer. Though he was nominated as a National Hero of the islands, her role as his partner and as one of the few women who successfully broke political molds went largely unrecognized until the 21st century. A highway in northern Saint Vincent bears her name.
