= North Central Windward =

Saint Vincent and the Grenadines Parliamentary Constituency

North Central Windward (NC) is a Vincentian Parliamentary Constituency. It is represented, and has been since 1994, by the former Prime Minister, Ralph Gonsalves.

== Elections ==
Vincentian general election, 2015: North Central Windward
| Party | Candidate | Votes | % | ±% |
|---|---|---|---|---|
| Unity Labour | Ralph Gonsalves | 3,015 | 79.8 | ▲0.3 |
| New Democratic | Kenroy Johnson | 746 | 19.7 | ▼0.5 |
| Democratic Republican Party (Saint Vincent and the Grenadines) | Haran Grant | 17 | 0.4 | New |
| Majority | | 2,269 | 60.1 | ▲0.8 |
| Turnout | | 3,778 | 71.3 | ▲11.0 |
| Registered electors | | 5,297 | | ▼15.4 |
| Unity Labour hold | | Swing | ▲0.4 | |
