= 1998 Vincentian general election =

- 15 June 1998

15 of 23 seats in the House of Assembly 8 seats needed for a majority
- Registered: 76,469
- Turnout: 67.36% (▲1.75pp)
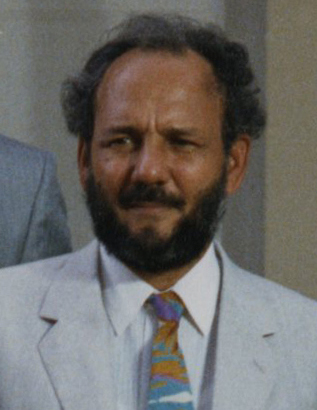

	First party	Second party
Leader	James Mitchell	Vincent Beache
Party	New Democratic	Unity Labour
Leader since	1975	1994
Last election	54.95%, 12 seats	43.96%, 3 seats
Seats won	8	7
Seat change	▼4	▲4
Popular vote	23,258	28,025
Percentage	45.31%	54.60%
Swing	▼9.64pp	▲10.64pp
- Results by constituency
Prime Minister before election
James Mitchell
New Democratic
Elected Prime Minister
James Mitchell
New Democratic

General elections were held in Saint Vincent and the Grenadines on 15 June 1998. Although the Unity Labour Party (ULP) received a majority of the public vote, the New Democratic Party (NDP) won a majority of seats, the first time the party receiving a majority of the vote had failed to win the elections since 1966. Voter turnout was 67%.

== Campaign ==
The ruling NDP led by Prime Minister James Mitchell was opposed by the ULP headed by Vincent Beache; the ULP had been founded in 1994 by a merger of the Movement for National Unity (MNU) and the Saint Vincent Labour Party. The election date had been announced on 18 May.

During the campaign, the NDP advocated tax cuts and the promotion of tourism and agricultural development, while the ULP called for job creation, economic development and improved social services.

== Results ==
When polling results giving the NDP eight seats and the ULP seven seats were announced, Beache declared that he could not accept the outcome and called for fresh elections, alleging voter intimidation, fraud, and bribery; this was promptly rebutted by the NDP. Final results showed the ULP had received 54.6% of valid votes.

Party	Votes	%	Seats	+/–
Unity Labour Party	28,025	54.60	7	+4
New Democratic Party	23,258	45.31	8	–4
People's Working Party	45	0.09	0	New
Total	51,328	100.00	15	0
Valid votes	51,328	99.64		
Invalid/blank votes	185	0.36		
Total votes	51,513	100.00		
Registered voters/turnout	76,469	67.36		
Source: Nohlen

=== By constituency ===
Constituency	ULP		NDP		PWP		Valid	Total	Turnout	Registered
Constituency	Votes	%	Votes	%	Votes	%	Valid	Total	Turnout	Registered
North Windward	1,817	49.2%	1,875	50.8%			3,692	3,704	79%	4,668
North Central Windward	2,943	78.1%	827	21.9%			3,770	3,789	67%	5,697
South Central Windward	1,811	48.5%	1,920	51.5%			3,731	3,751	70%	5,332
South Windward	2,361	67.3%	1,102	31.4%	45	1.3%	3,508	3,521	69%	5,086
Marriaqua	2,504	63.3%	1,453	36.7%			3957	3,966	69%	5,724
East St. George	2,514	62.3%	1,522	37.7%			4,036	4,046	68%	5,993
West St. George	2,366	62.5%	1,421	37.5%			3,787	3,803	65%	5,819
East Kingstown	1,655	49.6%	1,682	50.4%			3,337	3,346	60%	5,552
Central Kingstown	2,006	56.3%	1,558	43.7%			3,564	3,578	62%	5,792
West Kingstown	1,502	47.0%	1,691	53.0%			3,193	3,208	59%	5,403
South Leeward	2,014	48.8%	2,117	51.2%			4,131	4,147	69%	5,995
Central Leeward	2,183	56.7%	1,670	43.3%			3,853	3,861	74%	5,225
North Leeward	1,658	46.9%	1,880	53.1%			3,538	3,543	72%	4,932
Northern Grenadines	220	11.7%	1,668	88.3%			1,888	1,898	59%	3,236
Southern Grenadines	471	35.1%	872	64.9%			1,343	1,352	67%	2,015
Total	28,025	54.6%	23,258	45.3%	45	0.1%	51,328	51,513	67%	76,469
Source: Caribbean Elections

== Aftermath ==
On 17 June Mitchell was sworn in for his fourth consecutive term as Prime Minister; his new Cabinet took office the next day. In December 1998 Beache resigned as leader of the ULP, and Ralph Gonsalves was elected in his place. However, Beache remained as leader of the opposition in the House of Assembly.
