= 1974 Vincentian general election =

- 9 December 1974

13 seats in the House of Assembly 7 seats needed for a majority
- Registered: 45,181
- Turnout: 63.24% (▼12.37pp)

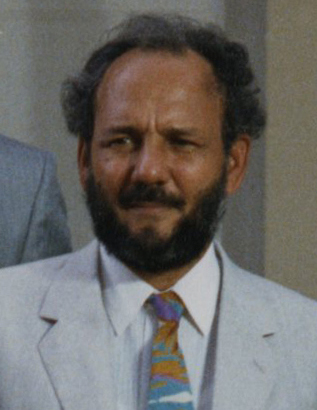

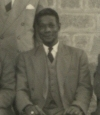
	First party	Second party	Third party
Leader	Milton Cato	James Mitchell	Ebenezer Joshua
Party	SVLP	Junta	PPP
Last election	50.42%, 6 seats	–	45.41%, 6 seats
Seats won	10	1	2
Seat change	▲4	New	▼4
Popular vote	19,579	4,641	3,806
Percentage	69.04%	16.37%	13.42%
Swing	▲18.62pp	New	▼31.99pp
- Results by constituency
Premier before election
James Mitchell
Independent
Elected Premier
Milton Cato
SVLP

General elections were held in Saint Vincent and the Grenadines on 9 December 1974. The result was a victory for the Saint Vincent Labour Party, which won ten of the 13 seats. Voter turnout was 63.2%.

== Background ==
After the 1972 elections, the People's Political Party (PPP) and the Saint Vincent Labour Party (SVLP) both won six seats. The People's Political Party (PPP) managed to form a government with the support of the remaining MP James Mitchell, who won reelection as an independent after resigning from the SVLP. The "Alliance Government" was formed with Mitchell as Premier and PPP leader Ebenezer Joshua as Deputy Premier and Minister of Finance.

On 18 September 1974, the House of Assembly passed a motion of no confidence; Ebenezer and Ivy Joshua had just resigned from the government due to policy disagreements with Mitchell. The Assembly was then dissolved on 23 September 1974. Nomination day was 18 November 1974.

== Candidates ==
A total of 31 candidates were nominated by five different political parties. Out of the parties in the Assembly, the SVLP had the largest contingent with eleven candidates. Mitchell and PPP minister Othniel Sylvester founded a splinter party and nominated eleven candidates, while the PPP nominated only three candidates.

In addition, two new political parties contested the elections. The Democratic Freedom Movement was founded by Kenneth John to advocate for political reforms such as recall elections, term limits, and campaign financing regulation; it nominated two candidates. The West Indies National Party was led by George Hamilton Charles, founder of the Eighth Army of Liberation and former Majority Leader of the Legislative Council (1951–1957); the party nominated four candidates (including Charles).

== Results ==
The SVLP won a decisive victory with ten seats, giving party leader Milton Cato his second term as Premier. Mitchell was the only successful candidate from his new party, and the Joshuas were the only successful PPP candidates. While Ebenezer Joshua joined the government as Minister of Agriculture and Trade, Ivy Joshua decided to remain in opposition rather than support a coalition with the SVLP. She then became Leader of the Opposition instead of Mitchell. In 1957, Ebenezer and Ivy had become the first married couple to be elected to a parliament of the British West Indies; now they became the first couple to serve on opposite benches.

Party	Votes	%	Seats	+/–
Saint Vincent Labour Party	19,579	69.04	10	+4
Mitchell/Sylvester Faction	4,641	16.37	1	New
People's Political Party	3,806	13.42	2	–4
Democratic Freedom Movement	217	0.77	0	New
West Indies National Party	116	0.41	0	New
Total	28,359	100.00	13	0
Valid votes	28,359	99.25		
Invalid/blank votes	215	0.75		
Total votes	28,574	100.00		
Registered voters/turnout	45,181	63.24		
Source: Nohlen
