= Vincent Beache =

Politician from Saint Vincent

Leader of Unity Labour Party
- In office 1994–1998
- Preceded by: New position
- Succeeded by: Ralph Gonsalves

Leader of Saint Vincent Labour Party
- In office 1994–1994
- Preceded by: Stanley 'Stalky' John
- Succeeded by: Party merged
- In office 1986 – September 1992
- Preceded by: Hudson K. Tannis
- Succeeded by: Stanley 'Stalky' John

Personal details
- Born: Vincent Ian Beache; 13 August 1931 South Rivers, St Vincent
- Died: 5 August 2019 (aged 87) Spring Estate

Sir Vincent Beache was a politician from Saint Vincent and leader of the Saint Vincent Labour Party.

Beache was born on 13 August 1931 in South Rivers, St Vincent. He served in the Royal Air Force, UK. He got training as electrical technician in UK.

In Saint Vincent, he was a banana grower. He was first a candidate of Saint Vincent Labour Party in House of Assembly elections in 1972. Later he was elected as a member of the House of Assembly from 1974 to 1989. Beache was appointed minister of trade and agriculture from March 1978 to April 1984.

After Saint Vincent Labour Party leader Hudson K. Tannis died in a plane crash in August 1986, Beache was elected to succeed him as party leader. He was appointed leader of the opposition in the House of Assembly from March 1985 to March 1989. Beache was the leader of the party at the time of the 1989 elections when the party failed to win any seats in the House of Assembly. Beache was replaced as the party leader in 1992. However, he was re-elected as party leader for the 1994 elections. Following the elections, he was again appointed leader of the opposition from March 1994 to August 1999.

Beache became the first leader of the Unity Labour Party in 1994 when Saint Vincent Labour Party and Movement for National Unity merged. Beache resigned as party leader in 1998, and he was succeeded by Ralph Gonsalves.

He was appointed by Ralph Gonsalves as the minister of national security, public service and airport development from April 2001 to November 2005. He retired from active politics before the 2005 elections. In 2002 he was awarded the Knight Commander of the Order of St Michael and St George (KCMG).

He died on 5 August 2019 at Spring Estate in St Vincent and the Grenadines.
