= 2001 Vincentian general election =

- 28 March 2001

15 of 23 seats in the House of Assembly 8 seats needed for a majority
- Registered: 84,536
- Turnout: 69.20% (▲1.84pp)
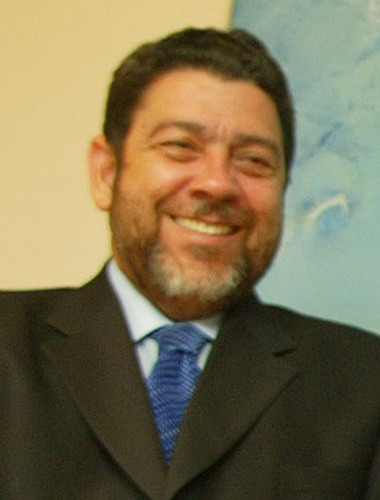

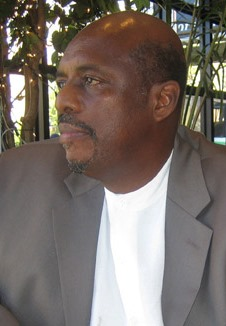
	First party	Second party
Leader	Ralph Gonsalves	Arnhim Eustace
Party	Unity Labour	New Democratic
Leader since	6 December 1998	27 October 2000
Leader's seat	North Central Windward	East Kingstown
Last election	7 seats	8 seats
Seats won	12	3
Seat change	▲5	▼5
Popular vote	32,925	23,844
Percentage	56.49%	40.91%
Swing	▲1.89pp	▼4.40pp
- Results by constituency
Prime Minister before election
Arnhim Eustace
New Democratic
Elected Prime Minister
Ralph Gonsalves
Unity Labour

General elections were held in Saint Vincent and the Grenadines on 28 March 2001. The Unity Labour Party (ULP), which had won the popular vote in the 1998 elections but lost to the New Democratic Party (NDP), this time won a landslide victory, taking 12 of the 15 seats, ending seventeen years of an NDP government. The NDP, which obtained its worst result since 1979, retained only three of its eight seats inclusive of the two Grenadines seats which had voted for the party's former leader, Sir James Mitchell, in every general election since 1966.

With his ULP having won every election until 2025, Gonsalves became the country's longest continuously-serving head of government in 2017, surpassing the previous record-holder, James Mitchell who had served continuously for 16 years and 2 months.

== Results ==
Party	Votes	%	Seats	+/–
Unity Labour Party	32,925	56.49	12	+5
New Democratic Party	23,844	40.91	3	–5
People's Progressive Movement	1,515	2.60	0	New
Total	58,284	100.00	15	0
Valid votes	58,284	99.63		
Invalid/blank votes	214	0.37		
Total votes	58,498	100.00		
Registered voters/turnout	84,536	69.20		
Source: Electoral Office
