= 1961 Vincentian general election =

- 20 April 1961

9 seats in the House of Assembly 5 seats needed for a majority
- Registered: 31,086
- Turnout: 77.13% (▲6.25pp)
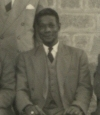

	First party	Second party
Leader	Ebenezer Joshua	Milton Cato
Party	PPP	SVLP
Last election	49.35%, 5 seats	19.03%, 0 seats
Seats won	6	3
Seat change	▲1	▲3
Popular vote	11,500	11,164
Percentage	49.32%	47.88%
Swing	▼0.03pp	▲28.85pp
- Results by constituency
Chief Minister before election
Ebenezer Joshua
PPP
Elected Chief Minister
Ebenezer Joshua
PPP

General elections were held in Saint Vincent and the Grenadines on 20 April 1961. The result was a victory for the People's Political Party, which won six of the nine seats. Voter turnout was 77.1%.

== Results ==
Party	Votes	%	Seats	+/–
People's Political Party	11,500	49.32	6	+1
Saint Vincent Labour Party	11,164	47.88	3	+3
Independents	654	2.80	0	–2
Total	23,318	100.00	9	+1
Valid votes	23,318	97.26		
Invalid/blank votes	658	2.74		
Total votes	23,976	100.00		
Registered voters/turnout	31,086	77.13		
Source: Nohlen
