= Democratic Freedom Movement =

Political party in Saint Vincent and the Grenadines

The Democratic Freedom Movement was a political party in Saint Vincent and the Grenadines.

== History ==
The party was established in 1970, and was led by Kenneth John. It did not run in the 1972 general elections, but nominated two candidates in the 1974 elections, but received just 217 votes and failed to win a seat. The party did not contest any further elections.

In 1978 the party merged with the People's Democratic Congress to form the People's Political Party.
