= Leader of the Opposition (Saint Vincent and the Grenadines) =

Political office

Leader of the Opposition is a constitutionally sanctioned office in Saint Vincent and the Grenadines.

The Constitution indicates that there shall be a Leader of the Opposition in the House of Assembly who is appointed by the Governor-General of Saint Vincent and the Grenadines.

The Leader of the Opposition gives advice to the Governor-General of Saint Vincent and the Grenadines for the appointment of two senators in the House of Assembly.

== Leaders of the Opposition ==
Name	Took office	Left office	Party	Notes
Ebenezer Joshua	26 June 1967	8 February 1972	People's Political Party	
Milton Cato	4 May 1972	18 September 1974	St. Vincent Labour Party	
Ivy Joshua	20 February 1975	27 October 1979	People's Political Party	
Calder Williams	27 December 1979	7 May 1981	New Democratic Party	
Randolph B. Russell	21 July 1981	18 August 1982	St. Vincent Labour Party	
James F. Mitchell	25 November 1982	22 December 1983	New Democratic Party	
Randolph B. Russell	12 April 1984	July 1984	St. Vincent Labour Party	
Milton Cato	23 August 1984	29 November 1984	St. Vincent Labour Party	
Vincent Beache	July 1985	March 1989	St. Vincent Labour Party	
Vacant	May 1989	21 March 1994		No parliamentary opposition
Vincent Beache	21 March 1994	30 August 1999	Unity Labour Party	
Ralph Gonsalves	8 December 1999	11 January 2001	Unity Labour Party	
Arnhim Eustace	17 April 2001	20 November 2016	New Democratic Party	
Godwin Friday	21 November 2016	28 November 2025	New Democratic Party	
Ralph Gonsalves	1 December 2025	Incumbent	Unity Labour Party	

== See also ==
- Politics of Saint Vincent and the Grenadines
- House of Assembly of Saint Vincent and the Grenadines
- Prime Minister of Saint Vincent and the Grenadines
