= East Kingstown =

Saint Vincent and the Grenadines Parliamentary Constituency

East Kingstown (EK) is a Parliamentary Constituency in Saint Vincent and the Grenadines. It is represented by the former Prime Minister Arnhim Eustace and has been represented by Eustace since 1998.

== Election ==
Election 2015

| Party | Candidate | Votes | % |
| New Democratic Party | Arnhim Eustace | 2444 | 51.32 |
| Unity Labour Party | Luke Browne | 2295 | 48.19 |
| Democratic Republican Party | Karima Parris | 43 | 0.48 |
