= Flambeau =

Flambeau may refer to:

- A burning torch, especially one carried in procession
  - Flambeau, a multi-flame torch traditionally carried in night parades during New Orleans Mardi Gras, Louisiana
  - Fiesta Flambeau parade, during Fiesta San Antonio, Texas
- Flambeau River, northern Wisconsin
  - Flambeau, Price County, Wisconsin
  - Flambeau, Rusk County, Wisconsin
  - Flambeau 400, a former Chicago and North Western passenger train
- Flambeau, one of the founding members of the Order of Hermes in the game Ars Magica
- Flambeau, a flame fed by natural gas on early natural gas wells to show that the gas was flowing; see Gas flare
- Flambeau butterfly Dryas iulia
- Flambeau (character), a character in G. K. Chesterton's Father Brown stories
- Flambeau (magazine), Saint Vincent magazine
- FSView & Florida Flambeau, a student newspaper at Florida State University

== See also ==
- Lac du Flambeau, Wisconsin
