= 1967 Vincentian general election =

- 19 May 1967

9 seats in the House of Assembly 5 seats needed for a majority
- Registered: 33,044
- Turnout: 82.55% (▼1.99pp)

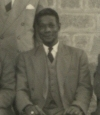
	First party	Second party
Leader	Milton Cato	Ebenezer Joshua
Party	SVLP	PPP
Last election	50.87%, 4 seats	49.03%, 5 seats
Seats won	6	3
Seat change	▲2	▼2
Popular vote	14,501	12,465
Percentage	53.78%	46.22%
Swing	▲2.91pp	▼2.81pp
- Results by constituency
Chief Minister before election
Ebenezer Joshua
PPP
Elected Chief Minister
Milton Cato
SVLP

General elections were held in Saint Vincent and the Grenadines on 19 May 1967, less than a year after the previous elections. The result was a victory for the Saint Vincent Labour Party, which won six of the nine seats. Voter turnout was 82.6%.

== Results ==
Party	Votes	%	Seats	+/–
Saint Vincent Labour Party	14,501	53.78	6	+2
People's Political Party	12,465	46.22	3	–2
Total	26,966	100.00	9	0
Valid votes	26,966	98.86		
Invalid/blank votes	312	1.14		
Total votes	27,278	100.00		
Registered voters/turnout	33,044	82.55		
Source: Nohlen
