= People's Liberation Movement =

The People's Liberation Movement may refer to:

- People's Liberation Movement-Chinchoneros
- People's Liberation Movement (El Salvador)
- People's Liberation Movement (Montserrat)
- People's Liberation Movement (Saint Vincent and the Grenadines)
- Yugoslav Partisans, sometimes referred to as the People's Liberation Movement
- Croatian Partisans, sometimes referred to as the People's Liberation Movement
