= United People's Movement (Saint Vincent and the Grenadines) =

Political party of Saint Vincent and the Grenadines

The United People's Movement was a political party in Saint Vincent and the Grenadines.

It was established just before the 1979 national elections as a leftist alliance. It comprised the Youlou Liberation Movement (Yulimo) (Ralph Gonsalves and Renwick Rose), Arwee (Oscar Allen) and the People's Democratic Movement (Kenneth John). It contested national elections in 1979, when it received 13.6% of the vote, but failed to win a seat.

Renwick Rose was the first leader of UPM, he was succeeded by Oscar Allen, and then by Adrian Saunders in 1988. Shortly before the 1984 elections several members left to form the Movement for National Unity after a majority of UPM members refused to renounce the policies of Fidel Castro. As a result, the party's vote share fell to 3.2% and it remained seatless. In 1989 it received just 468 votes and again failed to win a seat. It did not contest any further elections.

== Electoral history ==
=== House of Assembly elections ===
| Election | Votes | % | Seats | +/– | Position | Outcome |
|---|---|---|---|---|---|---|
| 1979 | 4,467 | 13.55% | 0 / 13 | Steady | ▲3rd | Extra-parliamentary |
| 1984 | 1,350 | 3.20% | 0 / 13 | Steady | 3rd | Extra-parliamentary |
| 1989 | 468 | 1.07% | 0 / 15 | Steady | ▼4th | Extra-parliamentary |
