= 1954 Vincentian general election =

General elections were held in Saint Vincent and the Grenadines in 1954. The majority of seats were won by independents. Voter turnout was 59.8%.

== Results ==
| Party | Votes | % | Seats | +/– |
|---|---|---|---|---|
| People's Political Party | 6,301 | 40.29 | 3 | New |
| Independents | 9,339 | 59.71 | 5 | +5 |
| Total | 15,640 | 100.00 | 8 | 0 |
| Valid votes | 15,640 | 89.55 | | |
| Invalid/blank votes | 1,825 | 10.45 | | |
| Total votes | 17,465 | 100.00 | | |
| Registered voters/turnout | 29,188 | 59.84 | | |
Source: Caribbean Elections
