= 1989 Vincentian general election =

- 16 May 1989

15 of 23 seats in the House of Assembly 8 seats needed for a majority
- Registered: 61,091
- Turnout: 72.38% (▼16.43pp)
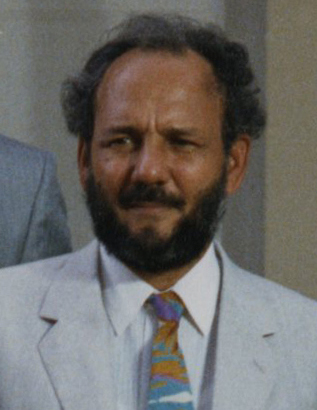

	First party	Second party
Leader	James Mitchell	Vincent Beache
Party	New Democratic	SVLP
Last election	51.41%, 9 seats	41.44%, 4 seats
Seats won	15	0
Seat change	▲6	▼4
Popular vote	29,079	13,290
Percentage	66.29%	30.30%
Swing	▲14.88pp	▼11.14pp
- Results by constituency
Prime Minister before election
James Mitchell
New Democratic
Elected Prime Minister
James Mitchell
New Democratic

General elections were held in Saint Vincent and the Grenadines on 16 May 1989. The result was a landslide victory for the centrist New Democratic Party, which won all fifteen seats, returning James Mitchell to a second term as prime minister. Voter turnout was 72%.

The 1989 election was the most lopsided in terms of the popular vote margin since the country gained independence in 1979, with the NDP securing a 36-point victory over the second-placed Saint Vincent Labour Party.

== Results ==
Party	Votes	%	Seats	+/–
New Democratic Party	29,079	66.29	15	+6
Saint Vincent Labour Party	13,290	30.30	0	–4
Movement for National Unity	1,030	2.35	0	0
United People's Movement	468	1.07	0	0
Total	43,867	100.00	15	+2
Valid votes	43,867	99.21		
Invalid/blank votes	351	0.79		
Total votes	44,218	100.00		
Registered voters/turnout	61,091	72.38		
Source: Nohlen
