= North Leeward =

Coordinates: 13.3°N 61.2°W

North Leeward is a Vincentian Parliamentary constituency. It has been represented by Roland Matthews since 2010.

== 2015 Election ==
Party	Candidate	Votes	%	Citation
New Democratic Party	Roland Matthews	2267	50.13	
Unity Labour Party	Carlos James	2255	49.87	
