= List of prime ministers of Saint Vincent and the Grenadines =

Prime Minister of Saint Vincent and the Grenadines
- Coat of arms of Saint Vincent and the Grenadines variant used by the Prime Minister

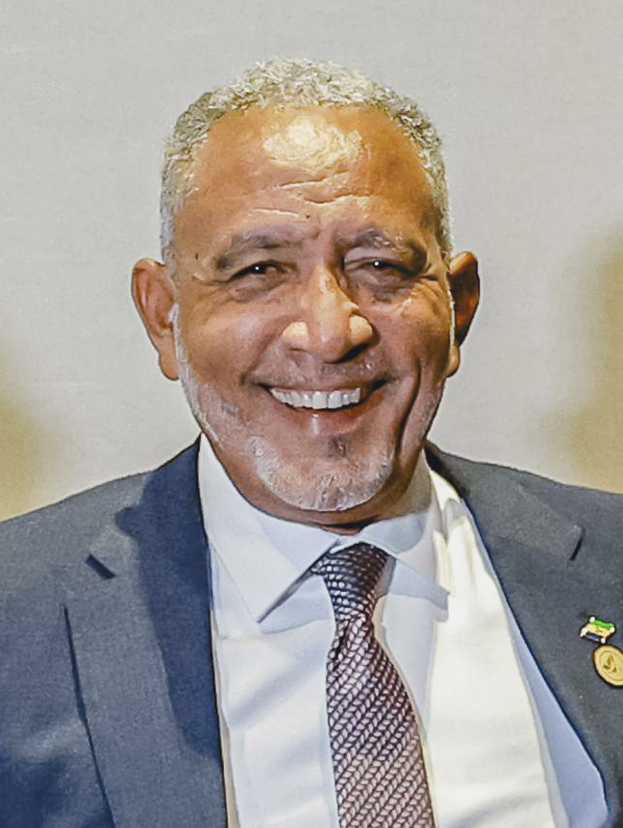
- Incumbent; Godwin Friday since 28 November 2025
- Style: The Right Honourable
- Residence: Prime Minister's Official Residence, Kingstown
- Appointer: Governor-General
- Term length: Five years, renewable
- Inaugural holder: Ebenezer Joshua (as Chief Minister); Milton Cato (as Premier)
- Formation: 27 October 1979; 46 years ago
- Deputy: Deputy Prime Minister
- Salary: EC$150,454 / US$55,724 annually
- Website: www.pmoffice.gov.vc

This article contains a list of prime ministers of Saint Vincent and the Grenadines.

== Constitutional basis ==
The office of prime minister is established by section 51 of the country's constitution, which provides that the governor-general shall appoint as prime minister the member of the House of Assembly "who appears to him likely to command the support of the majority of the Representatives".

Section 51(6) of the constitution requires the governor-general to remove the prime minister from office if the House of Assembly passes a motion of no confidence, unless within three days the prime minister either resigns or advises the governor-general to call an election.

== List of officeholders ==
Political parties

People's Political Party (PPP)
Saint Vincent Labour Party (SVLP)
New Democratic Party (NDP)
Unity Labour Party (ULP)

Other affiliations

Independent

=== Chief ministers of Saint Vincent (1960–1969) ===
No.	Portrait	Name (Birth–Death)	Election	Term of office			Political party
No.	Portrait	Name (Birth–Death)	Election	Took office	Left office	Time in office	Political party
1		Ebenezer Joshua (1908–1991)	1961; 1966	9 January 1960	30 May 1967	7 years, 141 days	PPP
2		Milton Cato (1915–1997)	1967	30 May 1967	27 October 1969	2 years, 150 days	SVLP

=== Premiers of Saint Vincent (1969–1979) ===
No.	Portrait	Name (Birth–Death)	Election	Term of office			Political party
No.	Portrait	Name (Birth–Death)	Election	Took office	Left office	Time in office	Political party
1		Milton Cato (1915–1997)	—	27 October 1969	13 April 1972	2 years, 169 days	SVLP
2		James Fitz-Allen Mitchell (1931–2021)	1972	14 April 1972	8 December 1974	2 years, 238 days	Independent
(1)		Milton Cato (1915–1997)	1974	8 December 1974	27 October 1979	4 years, 323 days	SVLP

=== Prime ministers of Saint Vincent and the Grenadines (1979–present) ===
No.	Portrait	Name (Birth–Death)	Election	Term of office			Political party
No.	Portrait	Name (Birth–Death)	Election	Took office	Left office	Time in office	Political party
1		Milton Cato (1915–1997)	1979	27 October 1979	30 July 1984	4 years, 277 days	SVLP
2		Sir James Fitz-Allen Mitchell (1931–2021)	1984; 1989; 1994; 1998	30 July 1984	27 October 2000	16 years, 89 days	NDP
3		Arnhim Eustace (born 1944)	—	27 October 2000	29 March 2001	153 days	NDP
4		Ralph Gonsalves (born 1946)	2001; 2005; 2010; 2015; 2020	29 March 2001	28 November 2025	24 years, 244 days	ULP
5		Godwin Friday (born 1959)	2025	28 November 2025	Incumbent	283 days	NDP

== Timeline ==
This is a graphical lifespan timeline of the prime ministers of Saint Vincent and the Grenadines. They are listed in order of first assuming office.

The following chart lists prime ministers by lifespan (living prime ministers on the green line), with the years outside of their tenure in beige.

== See also ==
- Governor-General of Saint Vincent and the Grenadines
- Deputy Prime Minister of Saint Vincent and the Grenadines
