= Minister of Finance of Saint Vincent and the Grenadines =

Government post

Minister of Finance of Saint Vincent and the Grenadines is a cabinet minister in charge of the Ministry of Finance of Saint Vincent and the Grenadines, responsible for public finances of the country. The portfolio includes currently also economic planning and information technology.

== Ministers of Finance ==
Name	Took office	Left office	Notes
Ebenezer Joshua	25 May 1961	30 May 1967	
Milton Cato	30 May 1967	14 April 1972	
Ebenezer Joshua	4 May 1972	9 May 1974	
Milton Cato	8 December 1974	27 October 1979	
Milton Cato	27 October 1979	30 July 1984	
James Fitz-Allen Mitchell	30 July 1984	9 July 1998	
Arnhim Eustace	9 July 1998	11 January 2001	
Ralph Gonsalves	28 March 2001	7 November 2017	
Camillo Gonsalves	7 November 2017	28 November 2025	
Godwin Friday	3 December 2025	Incumbent	

== See also ==
- Government of Saint Vincent and the Grenadines
- Economy of Saint Vincent and the Grenadines
