= Youlou United Liberation Movement =

Marxist-Leninist movement in Saint Vincent

Youlou United Liberation Movement (YULIMO) was a Marxist-Leninist political movement in Saint Vincent that emerged in the 1970s. YULIMO was later disbanded, and absorbed into the Movement for National Unity.

YULIMO actively struggled for national independence. Ralph Gonsalves was a member of YULIMO.
