= Arnhim Eustace =

Former Vincentian Prime Minister

The Honourable Arnhim Ulric Eustace MP
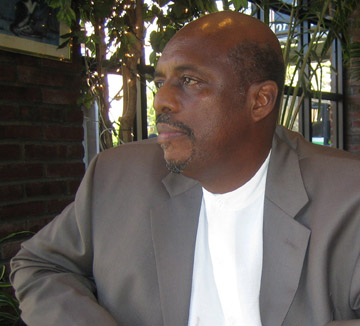

3rd Prime Minister of Saint Vincent and the Grenadines
- In office 27 October 2000 – 28 March 2001
- Monarch: Elizabeth II
- Governor-General: Sir Charles Antrobus
- Preceded by: James Fitz-Allen Mitchell
- Succeeded by: Ralph Gonsalves

Minister of Finance
- In office 9 July 1998 – 11 January 2001
- Prime Minister: James Fitz-Allen Mitchell and himself
- Preceded by: James Fitz-Allen Mitchell
- Succeeded by: Ralph Gonsalves

Leader of the New Democratic Party
- In office 27 October 2000 – 15 November 2016
- Preceded by: James Fitz-Allen Mitchell
- Succeeded by: Godwin Friday

Member of Parliament for East Kingstown
- In office 15 June 1998 – 9 October 2020
- Preceded by: Carlyle Dougan
- Succeeded by: Fitzgerald Bramble

Personal details
- Born: 5 October 1944 (age 81) British Windward Islands (now Saint Vincent and the Grenadines)
- Party: New Democratic Party
- Spouse: Jennifer Eustace (m. 1975)

Arnhim Ulric Eustace (born 5 October 1944) is a Vincentian retired politician and economist. He served as the third prime minister of Saint Vincent and the Grenadines, and is the former longtime leader of the opposition and former president of the New Democratic Party (NDP) after resigning in 2016.

Eustace was a Member of Parliament (MP) for the constituency of East Kingstown in the House of Assembly of Saint Vincent and the Grenadines from 1998 until his retirement in 2020. On 27 October 2000, Eustace, then a political neophyte, succeeded James Fitz-Allen Mitchell as the leader of the NDP, and on 28 March 2001, the NDP was defeated in the 2001 general election. The party was reduced from 8 to 3 seats, producing a majority government for the Unity Labour Party.

In the 7 December 2005 general elections, Eustace's NDP also won 3 seats. In the 13 December 2010 general election, Eustace's NDP saw an increase in the popular vote to 48.67%, winning 7 seats in a close election. The number required to form a majority in the House of Assembly of Saint Vincent and the Grenadines is 8, and the incumbent ULP formed government with a one-seat majority.

== Education and early career ==
Arnhim Eustace is an alumnus of the St Vincent Boys' Grammar School. He attended Sir George William University (now Concordia) in Montreal, Quebec, Canada, where he earned a BSc in Economics and a MSc in Development Economics from University of Windsor in Ontario, Canada.

At the age of 27, Eustace became the youngest permanent secretary in St. Vincent and the Grenadines when he was so assigned to the Ministry of Agriculture. His ascendancy was cut short when in 1976 he resigned from the civil service on a point of principle. For roughly one year after his departure he fished, literally, the waters off Edinboro, until Sir William Demas flew into St. Vincent to recruit the young economist into the Caribbean Development Bank.

In 1977, Eustace and his family relocated to Barbados where, with the exception of roughly one year, they lived for the next 16 years, his full tour of duty with the CDB. There he rose from Administrative Officer through the ranks of the institution, ultimately becoming Director of Projects, third in the line of seniority at the regional institution, before repatriating to St. Vincent in 1993.

In 1985 Eustace was for 18 months seconded by the CDB to the United Nations Development Programme (UNDP) which assigned him to the Government of St. Vincent and the Grenadines to review and implement changes to the public finance system and to manage government finances as Director General of Finance and Planning.

Upon his 1993 return to St. Vincent, Eustace was appointed Fiscal Adviser to the Government of St. Vincent and the Grenadines.

From 1993 to 1998 Eustace was chairman of WIBDECO as well as the Joint Venture Holding Companies in the UK. He headed the Windward Islands negotiating team for the acquisition of GEEST Bananas (including the GEEST shipping fleet) in a joint venture with Fyffes of Ireland. Eustace was chairman of the National Insurance Scheme (NIS). He was also the Government Director on the board of the East Caribbean Group of Companies (ECGC).

== Parliamentary career ==
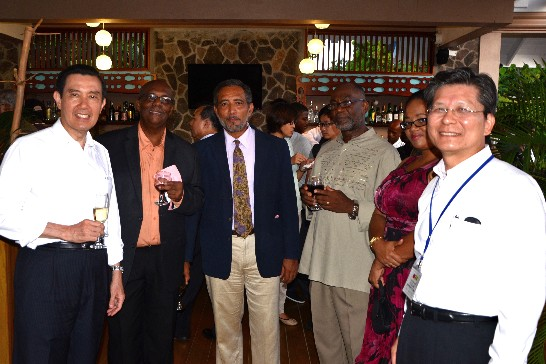
Eustace (second from left) with Ma Ying-jeou

In 1998, he resigned from the public service and ran for political office, winning the East Kingstown parliamentary seat previously held by fellow party member Carlyle Dougan. Following the 1998 general elections, he was appointed Minister of Finance, Planning and the Public Service. Later that year he was offered the post of Deputy Secretary General of the British Commonwealth Secretariat in London, which he declined.

In 2000, Eustace was elected leader of the New Democratic Party and upon the October 2000 retirement of Sir James Mitchell, was appointed prime minister of St. Vincent and the Grenadines until the NDP's loss at the March 2001 General Elections.

Eustace remained president of The New Democratic Party, and leader of the opposition from April 2001. In the following three general elections, the NDP representation rose from 3–12 to 7–8, within narrow reach of forming the government.

In 2016, Eustace resigned as both leader of the opposition and President of the New Democratic Party after holding the two positions for 15 years.

In 2020, Eustace retired from Parliament. In the 2020 election, NDP candidate Fitzgerald Bramble was elected as the new MP for East Kingstown.

Political offices
Preceded by James Fitz-Allen Mitchell	Prime Minister of Saint Vincent and the Grenadines; 2000–2001	Succeeded by Ralph Gonsalves
