= Hudson Tannis =

Saint Vincent politician (1928–1986)

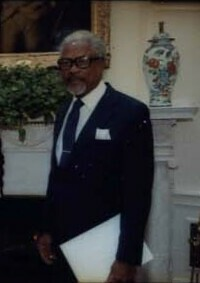

Deputy Prime Minister of Saint Vincent and the Grenadines
- In office October 1980 – July 1984
- Prime Minister: Milton Cato
- Succeeded by: Edward Griffith

Leader of Saint Vincent Labour Party
- In office January 1985 – August 1986
- Preceded by: Milton Cato
- Succeeded by: Vincent Beache

Personal details
- Born: Hudson Kemuel Tannis; 1928
- Died: 3 August 1986

Hudson Kemuel Tannis was a politician from Saint Vincent, Deputy Prime Minister of Saint Vincent and the Grenadines and leader of the Saint Vincent Labour Party.

Tannis was born in 1928. He worked as barrister-at-law.

Tannis was a member of Saint Vincent Labour Party. He was first elected as a member of the House of Assembly in 1967.

Tannis held many cabinet positions during Milton Cato administrations. He was minister of communications, works and labour from 1969 to 1970. He was minister of education and health from 1970 to 1972. He was minister of communications and works from 1975 to 1977. He was minister of home affairs and tourism from 1977 to 1978 and from 1979 to 1980. He was minister of external affairs and tourism from 1980 until 1984. He was also accredited as the non-resident ambassador to United States since 1981. Tannis was Deputy Prime Minister from October 1980 to July 1984, when Labour Party lost elections

Tannis was elected to succeed retiring Milton Cato as party leader in January 1985. However, he disappeared on 3 August 1986 on LIAT Flight 319 when returning from Saint Lucia.
