= Postage stamps and postal history of Saint Vincent and the Grenadines =

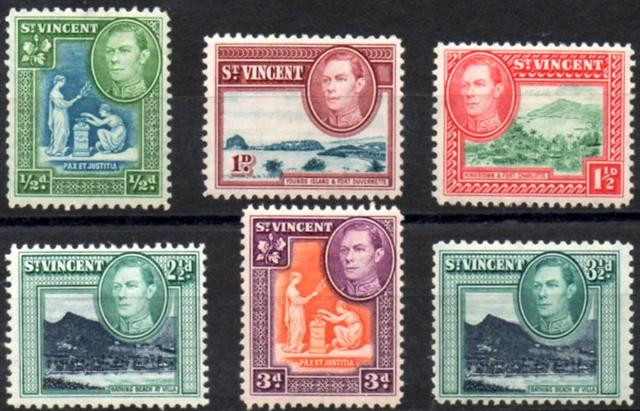
1938 stamps of St. Vincent

Saint Vincent and the Grenadines, a former British colony in the Windward Islands, has produced stamps since 8 May 1861. The stamps featured either the British monarch’s head on them or the ER monogram and crown until around 1970. The stamps were printed with just "St. Vincent" until 1992 when the stamps began to print the full country name, "St. Vincent and the Grenadines".

Since around 1988, the country has been a client of the Inter-Governmental Philatelic Corporation.

== Early Issues (1861–1912) ==
The islands first began to issue stamps in 1861 and featured Queen Victoria. They were followed by the stamps of King Edward VII by 1902, which featured his portrait, then those of King George V in 1912.

== King George V, King George VI and early Elizabethan issues (1912–1970) ==
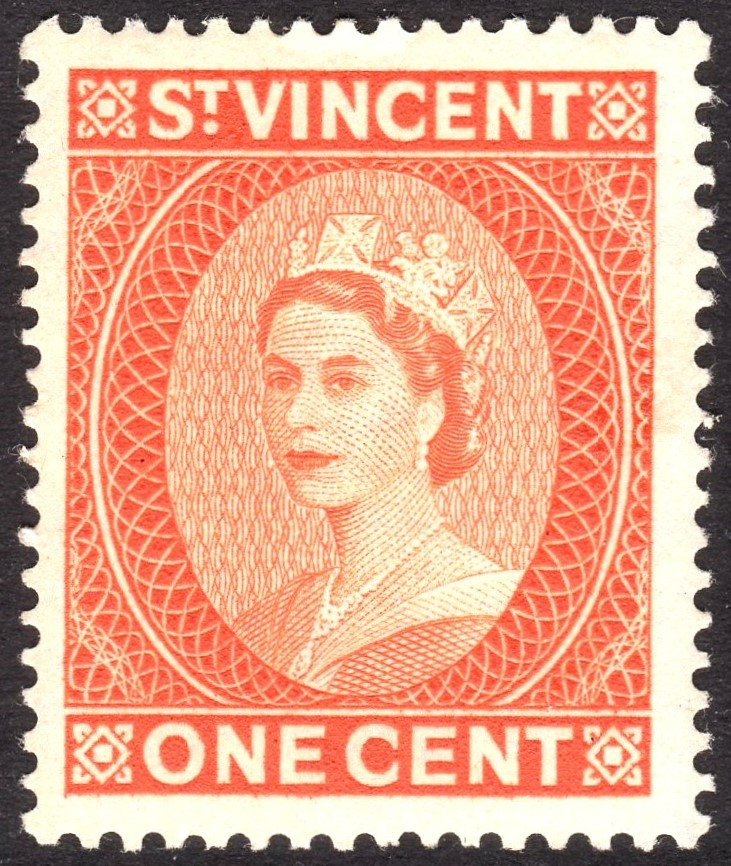
A 1c stamp from the 1955 definitive issue

The King George V of 1912 had just only featured his portrait, later ones featured his portrait with island scenes.

They were followed by stamps of his silver jubilee in 1935.

Coronation issues of King George VI followed in 1937, along with the new King George VI stamps, the following year (pictured above).

This was followed by the Victory Stamps of 1946, featuring the king's portrait, along with the Tower of Westminster; as well as the Royal Silver Wedding of 1948.

By 1953 stamps of the coronation of Queen Elizabeth II were introduced, along with stamps showing her portrait and island scenes.

== 1970–1988 ==
By around 1970 the portraits and the royal ciphers of the Queen were removed. The number of issues had increased since the 1960s and 1970s, showing both local (such as Carnival events) and international events (such as the American Independence Bicentennial of 1976).

Stamps featuring the American Independence Bicentennial in 1976 and the Silver Jubilee of Queen Elizabeth II in 1977 featured portraits of the past monarchs of the United Kingdom and past presidents of the United States of America.

By 1983 the stamps began to show a series of automobile and locomotive stamps known as the Leaders of the World stamp series, which continued until 1986. In 1985 Saint Vincent issued the very first stamps featuring Elvis Presley and Michael Jackson. Unauthorized reproductions of both series were made that are completely different than the genuine stamps and noted to exist in Stanley Gibbons 2007 specialized Windward Islands and Barbados Catalog on pages 160 and 161. In 1986 Saint Vincent issued a series of stamps showing footballers honouring the 1986 World Cup. In 1988 Saint Vincent issued stamps featuring cricketers.

== IGPC years (1988–present) ==
Around 1988 the country became a client of the Inter-Governmental Philatelic Corporation, after which the island began to issue stamps of baseball players from 1988 until the mid-1990s, such as Babe Ruth on the 1988 issue. This was followed by Disney themed Christmas stamps of 1988, featuring Mickey Mouse and his friends.

A 1992 issue featuring Elvis Presley proved even more popular. Scott Tilson was able to sell 8,000 sets (out of a run of 20,000) before starting an advertising campaign. The general manager of the Philatelic Service, Alphonso Dennie, ranked the Elvis issue as the best selling since its Michael Jackson issue, which sold well in Asia.

By the early-1990s an excessive number of issues arose. In 1994 it began issuing stamps showing Japanese football players and teams (such as JEF United) as well as the 1994 World Cup in the US.

In 1996 it became one of the first countries to issue stamps featuring Star Wars. The following year it began to issue stamps on Star Trek: Voyager.

By 2001–02 it issued stamps featuring Pokémon. Other stamps showed Popeye and Betty Boop.
