= 1984 Vincentian general election =

- 25 July 1984

13 of 21 seats in the House of Assembly 7 seats needed for a majority
- Registered: 47,863
- Turnout: 88.81% (▲24.91pp)
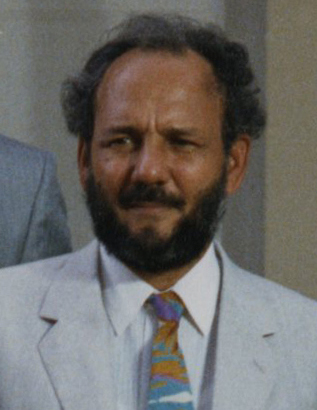

	First party	Second party
Leader	James Mitchell	Milton Cato
Party	New Democratic	SVLP
Last election	27.38%, 2 seats	54.24%, 11 seats
Seats won	9	4
Seat change	▲7	▼7
Popular vote	21,700	17,493
Percentage	51.41%	41.44%
Swing	▲24.03pp	▼12.80pp
- Results by constituency
Prime Minister before election
Milton Cato
SVLP
Elected Prime Minister
James Mitchell
NDP

General elections were held in Saint Vincent and the Grenadines on 25 July 1984. The result was a victory for the New Democratic Party, which won nine of the thirteen seats. Voter turnout was 89%.

== Results ==
Party	Votes	%	Seats	+/–
New Democratic Party	21,700	51.41	9	+7
Saint Vincent Labour Party	17,493	41.44	4	–7
United People's Movement	1,350	3.20	0	0
Movement for National Unity	855	2.03	0	New
People's Democratic Party	810	1.92	0	New
Total	42,208	100.00	13	0
Valid votes	42,208	99.30		
Invalid/blank votes	299	0.70		
Total votes	42,507	100.00		
Registered voters/turnout	47,863	88.81		
Source: Nohlen
