= People's Working Party =

Vincentian political party

The People's Working Party was a political party in Saint Vincent and the Grenadines. Under the leadership of Burton Williams, it contested the 1998 general elections, but received just 45 votes and failed to win a seat. It did not contest any further elections.

One of the party's main platforms revolved around the re-institution of the local government system as a means to increase individual participation in matters relating to the country's political affairs.
