= 1951 Vincentian general election =

General elections were held in Saint Vincent and the Grenadines in 1951. The result was a victory for the Eighth Army of Liberation, which won all eight seats. Voter turnout was 69.7%.

== Results ==
Party	Votes	%	Seats
Eighth Army of Liberation	12,544	70.42	8
Workers' Association	3,203	17.98	0
Independents	2,065	11.59	0
Total	17,812	100.00	8
Valid votes	17,812	93.21	
Invalid/blank votes	1,298	6.79	
Total votes	19,110	100.00	
Registered voters/turnout	27,409	69.72	
Source: Caribbean Elections
