= People's Liberation Movement (Saint Vincent and the Grenadines) =

- Leader: Herman Young
- Founded: 1957

The People's Liberation Movement was a political party in Saint Vincent and the Grenadines led by Herman Young.

== History ==
The party was established in 1957 and contested the general elections that year, running five candidates for the eight elected seats.

The party received 15% of the vote and won one seat, Young winning in South Leeward. It did not contest any further elections.
