= Ralph Gonsalves =

Prime Minister of Saint Vincent and the Grenadines from 2001 to 2025

The Honourable Ralph Gonsalves MP
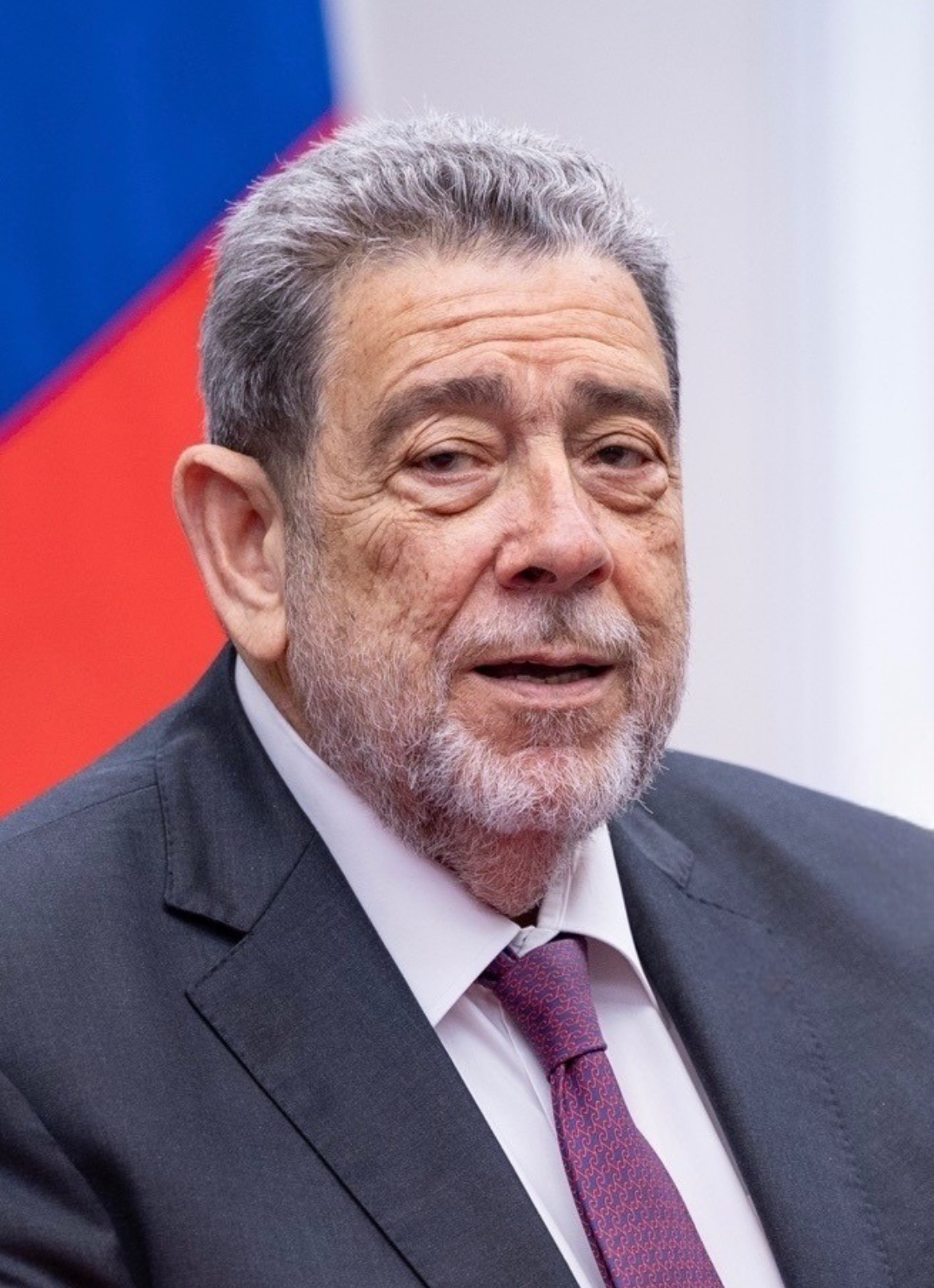
- Gonsalves in 2024

4th Prime Minister of Saint Vincent and the Grenadines
- In office 29 March 2001 – 28 November 2025
- Monarchs: Elizabeth II; Charles III
- Governors-General: Charles Antrobus; Monica Dacon (Acting); Frederick Ballantyne; Susan Dougan
- Deputy: Girlyn Miguel (2010–2015); Louis Straker (2015–2020); Montgomery Daniel (2020–2025)
- Preceded by: Arnhim Eustace
- Succeeded by: Godwin Friday

Leader of the Opposition of Saint Vincent and the Grenadines
- Incumbent
- Assumed office 1 December 2025
- Monarch: Charles III
- Governors-General: Susan Dougan; Stanley John
- Preceded by: Godwin Friday
- In office 8 December 1999 – 11 January 2001
- Monarch: Elizabeth II
- Governor-General: Charles Antrobus
- Preceded by: Vincent Beache
- Succeeded by: Arnhim Eustace

Leader of the Unity Labour Party
- Incumbent
- Assumed office 6 December 1998
- Preceded by: Vincent Beache

Chairman of the Caribbean Community
- In office 1 July 2020 – 30 December 2021
- Secretary-General: Irwin LaRocque
- Preceded by: Mia Mottley
- Succeeded by: Keith Rowley
- In office 1 January 2014 – 30 June 2014
- Secretary-General: Irwin LaRocque
- Preceded by: Kamla Persad-Bissessar
- Succeeded by: Gaston Browne

Minister of Finance
- In office 29 March 2001 – 10 November 2017
- Prime Minister: Himself
- Preceded by: Arnhim Eustace
- Succeeded by: Camillo Gonsalves

Member of Parliament for North Central Windward
- Incumbent
- Assumed office 21 March 1994
- Preceded by: Jonathan Peters

Personal details
- Born: 8 August 1946 (age 80) Colonarie, Saint Vincent, British Windward Islands (now Saint Vincent and the Grenadines)
- Party: Unity Labour Party
- Spouse: Eloise Harris
- Children: 5, including Camillo
- Education: University of the West Indies; University of Manchester; Inns of Court School of Law

Ralph Everard Gonsalves (born 8 August 1946) is a Vincentian politician who served as prime minister of Saint Vincent and the Grenadines from 2001 to 2025, and as the leader of the Unity Labour Party (ULP) since 2001. He was the longest continuously serving prime minister since St. Vincent's independence in 1979, with almost 25 years in office. Gonsalves has been Member of Parliament (MP) for the constituency of North Central Windward since 1994.

He became deputy leader upon the formation of the ULP in 1994 and party leader in 1998. Gonsalves became prime minister after his party won a majority government in the 2001 general election. He was the first prime minister from the newly constructed ULP, following a merger of the Saint Vincent and the Grenadines Labour Party and the Movement for National Unity.

With Gonsalves as leader, the ULP won a majority in the popular vote in every general election from 1998 through 2015, though it failed to secure the majority of parliamentary seats in the 1998 election. In 2020, the ULP won the election, but did not win the popular vote. On 7 November 2020, Gonsalves was sworn in for his fifth term as prime minister. In the 2025 general election, his party was defeated by Godwin Friday's New Democratic Party, with Gonsalves being the only member of the ULP to win re-election.

Gonsalves was the longest-serving democratically-elected state leader since Samoan PM Tuilaʻepa Saʻilele Malielegaoi was replaced in 2021, until his defeat in 2025.

== Early life and education ==
Gonsalves, known affectionately as "Comrade Ralph", was born in Colonarie, Saint Vincent, British Windward Islands to his father, Alban Gonsalves, a farmer and small businessman (now deceased), and his mother, Theresa Francis, a small businesswoman. His ancestors came to Saint Vincent and the Grenadines in 1845 as indentured servants from the Portuguese island of Madeira.

Gonsalves attended Colonarie Roman Catholic School, and later the St. Vincent Grammar School. He then enrolled at the University of the West Indies, where he completed a bachelor's degree in economics. He later returned there to earn a master's degree in government, which he completed in 1971. In 1974, he completed a doctorate in government at the University of Manchester. Gonsalves was called to the bar at Gray's Inn in London in 1981. He also attended Makerere University in Uganda according to his address at the United Nations during the Africa Day event on 25 May 2019.

== Early political career ==
Gonsalves became involved in politics at university, as president of the University of West Indies' Guild of Undergraduates and Debating Society. In 1968, he led a student protest of the deportation of historian and intellectual Walter Rodney by the Jamaican government.

In 1994, Gonsalves became the deputy leader of the Unity Labour Party. After the resignation of Vincent Beache, Gonsalves became leader of the party in 1998. He was appointed leader of the opposition from December 1999 to January 2001.

== Prime Minister (2001–2025) ==
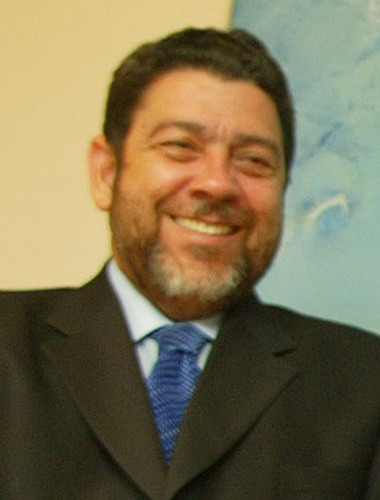
Gonsalves in 2004

Gonsalves was appointed Prime Minister of Saint Vincent and the Grenadines after he led the Unity Labour Party to victory in the 2001 Vincentian general election. He led the party to victory in a record four subsequent elections: 2005, 2010, 2015, and 2020. Gonsalves and the ULP were defeated in a landslide the 2025 Vincentian general election by the New Democratic Party led by Godwin Friday. The ULP lost eight of its nine seats in the House of Assembly, with Gonsalves being the sole member of the party to retain his seat, North Central Windward.

=== Domestic policy ===
In 2009 Gonsalves and the ULP led a referendum campaign in favour of constitutional reform that would have abolished the country's constitutional monarchy, replacing Elizabeth II with a non-executive president. The referendum was defeated, with 55.64% of voters rejecting the changes. Gonsalves has persisted in his calls for the establishment of a presidency, proposing another referendum in 2022 to replace the monarchy while also voicing support to rename places in the country named after colonial figures such as Victoria Park.

From 2001 to 2017, Gonsalves also served as Minister of Finance. He handed over the position to his son, Camillo Gonsalves in a 2017 cabinet reshuffle.

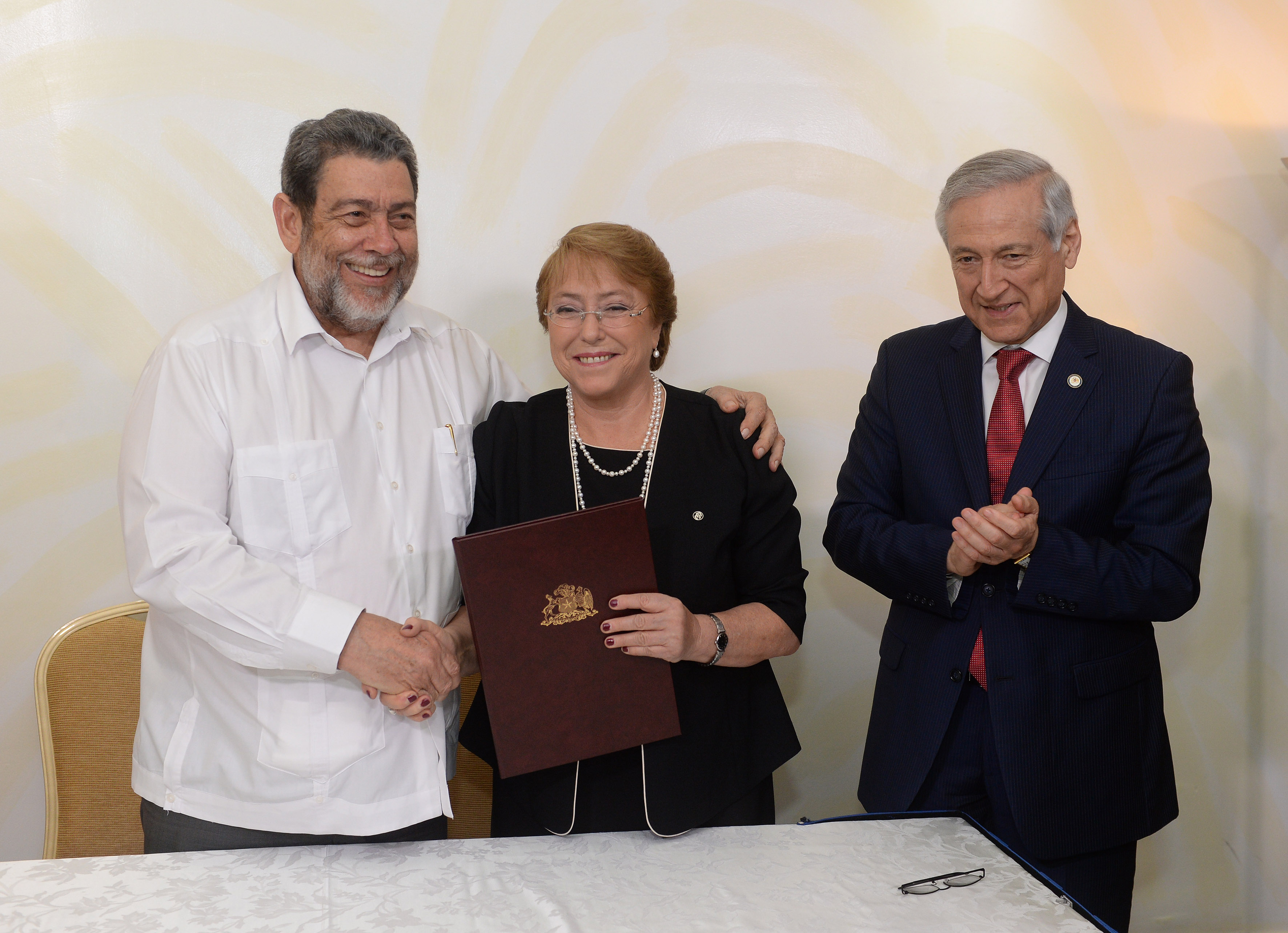
Gonsalves at a CARICOM meeting in 2016 with President of Chile Michelle Bachelet and Chilean Foreign Minister Heraldo Muñoz

Gonsalves supports capital punishment.

=== Foreign policy ===
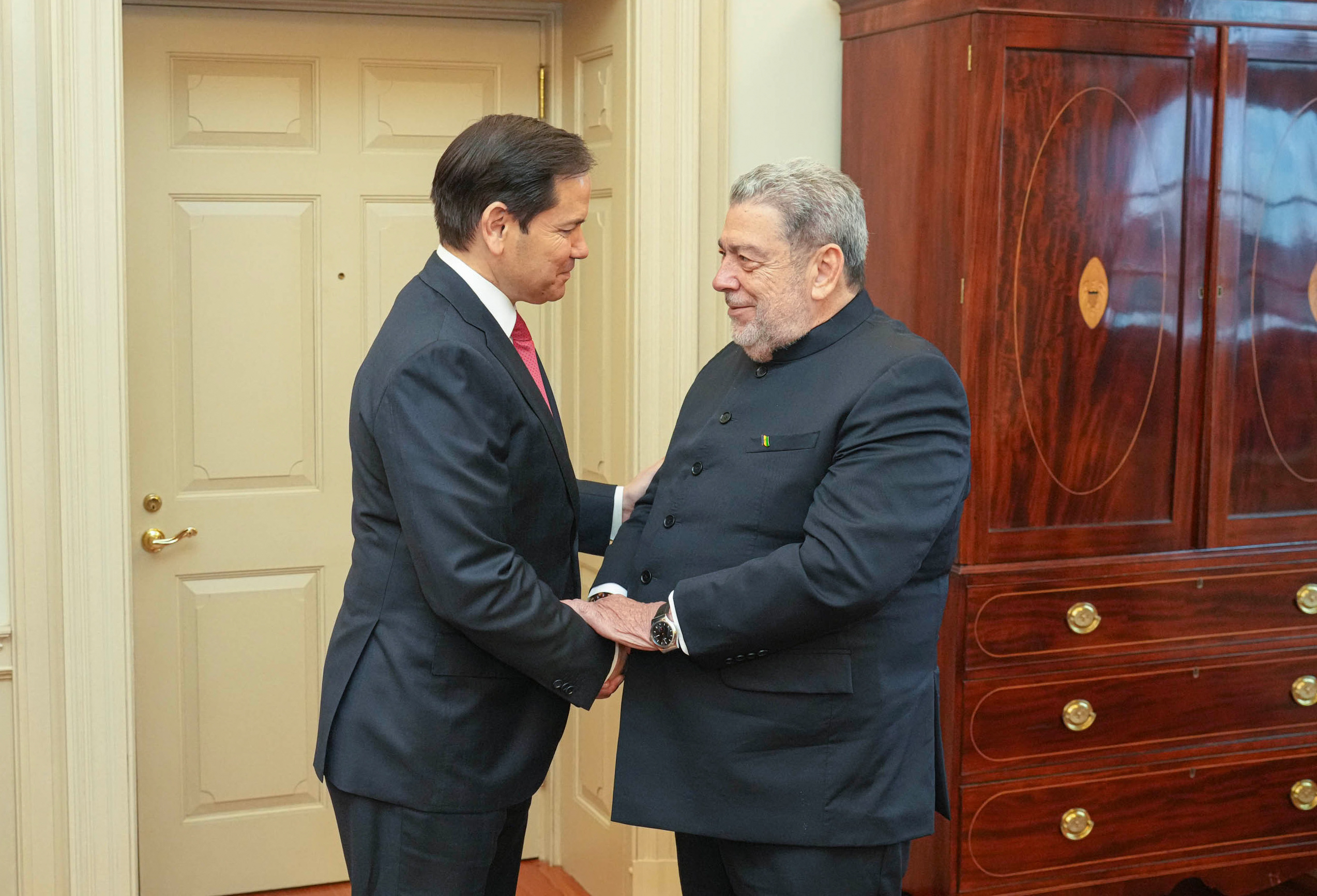
Gonsalves with United States secretary of state Marco Rubio, in 2025

On 3 July 2020, Gonsalves was elected Chairman of the Caribbean Community succeeding Mia Mottley. His 6-month term ended on 1 January 2021, and he was succeeded by Trinidad and Tobago Prime Minister, Keith Rowley.

Gonsalves attended the coronation of Charles III and Camilla at Westminster Abbey along with Governor-General Susan Dougan on 6 May 2023. Gonsalves met with the King and other leaders of the Commonwealth the day prior.

Gonsalves helped to organize a meeting in Saint Vincent and the Grenadines between Venezuelan President Nicolás Maduro and Guyanese President Irfaan Ali to discuss the 2023 Guyana-Venezuela crisis between the two nations. Gonsalves called on Maduro and Ali "to de-escalate the situation" and engage in "appropriate dialogue". Also invited to the meeting was Brazilian President Luiz Inácio Lula da Silva.

== Personal life ==
Gonsalves has been married twice; currently he is married to Eloise Harris. He has two sons by his first marriage, Camillo and Adam; one son by his second wife, Storm; and two daughters, Isis and Soleil. Camillo followed his father into politics, and is currently serving as Minister of Finance.

Gonsalves practices law before the Eastern Caribbean Supreme Court. He has written and published on a range of matters including the Caribbean, Africa, trade unionism, comparative political economy, and developmental issues generally.

On 5 August 2021, at a protest against mandatory vaccination from COVID-19 organized by trade unions representing nurses, police and other workers, Gonsalves was attacked with a projectile near the entrance to Parliament. He sustained visible injuries to his head in the attack and was rushed to the hospital.

== International honours ==
- Argentina :
  - Grand Cross of the Order of the Liberator General San Martín (8 October 2013)
- Cuba :
  - Order of José Marti (26 May 2022)
- Japan :
  - Grand Cordon of the Order of the Rising Sun (23 August 2024)
- Taiwan :
  - Order of Brilliant Star with Special Grand Cordon (9 September 2003)

== Publications ==
Books

- Diary of a Prime Minister: Ten days among Benedictine Monks
- The Making of 'the Comrade': The Political Journey of Ralph Gonsalves
- The spectre of imperialism: the case of the Caribbean (University of the West Indies; 128 pages, 1976)
- The non-capitalist path of development: Africa and the Caribbean (One Caribbean Publishers; 1981)
- History and the future: a Caribbean perspective (169 pages, 1994)
- Notes on some basic ideas in Marxism-Leninism (University of the West Indies; 56 pages)

Theses

- The role of labour in the political process of St. Vincent (1935–1970) (Master's Thesis, 1971)
- The politics of trade unions and industrial relations in Uganda (1950–1971) (Doctoral Thesis, 1974)

Pamphlets

- The Rodney affair and its aftermath (University of the West Indies; 21 pages, 1975)
- The development and class character of the bourgeois state: the case of St. Vincent (University of the West Indies; 15 pages, 1976)
- Controls and influences on the civil service and statutory bodies in the Commonwealth Caribbean: a preliminary discussion (University of the West Indies; 67 pages, 1977)
- The development of the labour movement in St. Vincent (37 pages, 1977)
- Who killed sugar in St. Vincent? (United Liberation Movement; 21 pages, 1977)
- On the political economy of Barbados (One Caribbean Publishers; 49 pages, 1981)
- The trade union movement in St. Vincent and the Grenadines (Movement for National Unity; 64 pages, 1983)
- Ebenezer Joshua: his ideology and style (Movement for National Unity; 39 pages, 1984)
- (editor) The trial of George McIntosh (Caribbean Diaspora Press; 80 pages, 1985)
- Authority in the police force: its uses and abuses (Movement for National Unity; 45 pages, 1986)
- Banana in trouble: its present and future (Movement for National Unity; 22 pages, 1989)

Party political offices
Preceded by Vincent Beache	Leader of the Unity Labour Party; 1998–present	Incumbent
Political offices
Preceded by Arnhim Eustace	Prime Minister of Saint Vincent and the Grenadines; 2001–2025	Succeeded by Godwin Friday
Preceded by Louis Straker	Minister of Foreign Affairs; 2020–2022	Succeeded by Keisal Peters
Diplomatic posts
Preceded by Mia Mottley	Chairman of the Caribbean Community; 2020–2021	Succeeded by Keith Rowley
