= 1966 Vincentian general election =

- 22 August 1966

9 seats in the House of Assembly 5 seats needed for a majority
- Registered: 33,044
- Turnout: 84.54% (▲7.41pp)
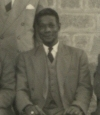

	First party	Second party
Leader	Ebenezer Joshua	Milton Cato
Party	PPP	SVLP
Last election	49.03%, 5 seats	50.87%, 4 seats
Seats won	5	4
Seat change	▼1	▲1
Popular vote	13,427	13,930
Percentage	49.03%	50.87%
Swing	▼0.29pp	▲2.99pp
- Results by constituency
Chief Minister before election
Ebenezer Joshua
PPP
Elected Chief Minister
Ebenezer Joshua
PPP

General elections were held in Saint Vincent and the Grenadines on 22 August 1966. Although the Saint Vincent Labour Party received the most votes, the People's Political Party won a majority of seats. Voter turnout was 84.1%.

== Results ==
Party	Votes	%	Seats	+/–
Saint Vincent Labour Party	13,930	50.87	4	+1
People's Political Party	13,427	49.03	5	–1
Independents	28	0.10	0	0
Total	27,385	100.00	9	0
Valid votes	27,385	98.02		
Invalid/blank votes	552	1.98		
Total votes	27,937	100.00		
Registered voters/turnout	33,044	84.54		
Source: Caribbean Elections

=== By constituency ===
Constituency	SVLP		PPP		Independents		Valid votes
Constituency	Votes	%	Votes	%	Votes	%	Valid votes
North Leeward	1,500	49.9	1,504	50.1			3,004
South Leeward	1,996	62.9	1,179	37.1			3,175
Kingstown	2,040	49.4	2,089	50.6			4,129
West St. George	1,297	40.2	1,926	59.8			3,223
East St. George	1,955	61.9	1,202	38.1			3,157
South Windward	2,281	73.3	830	26.7			3,111
Central Windward	927	32.1	1,960	67.9			2,887
North Windward	768	28.9	1,890	71.1			2,658
Grenadines	1,166	57.1	847	41.5	28	1.4	2,041
Total	13,930	50.9	13,427	49.0	28	0.1	27,385
Source: Caribbean Elections
