= 2005 Vincentian general election =

General election held in Saint Vincent and the Grenadines

- 7 December 2005

15 of 23 seats in the House of Assembly 8 seats needed for a majority
- Registered: 91,045
- Turnout: 63.67% (▼5.53pp)
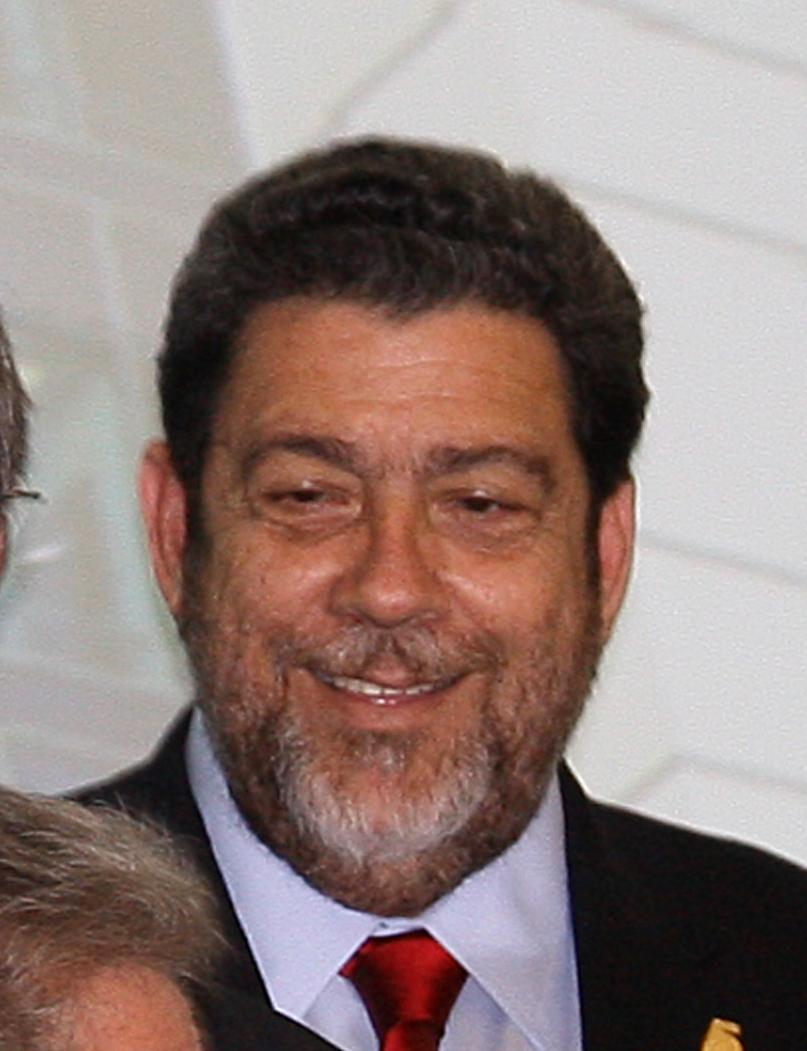

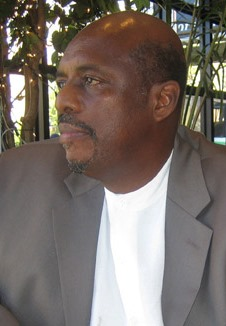
	First party	Second party
Leader	Ralph Gonsalves	Arnhim Eustace
Party	Unity Labour	New Democratic
Leader since	6 December 1998	27 October 2000
Leader's seat	North Central Windward	East Kingstown
Last election	56.49%, 12 seats	40.91, 3 seats
Seats won	12	3
Seat change	Steady	Steady
Popular vote	31,848	25,748
Percentage	55.26%	44.68%
Swing	▼1.2%	▲3.8%
- Results by constituency
Prime Minister before election
Ralph Gonsalves
Unity Labour
Elected Prime Minister
Ralph Gonsalves
Unity Labour

General elections were held in Saint Vincent and the Grenadines on 7 December 2005. The result was a repeat of the 2001 general election with the ruling Unity Labour Party retaining all twelve of its seats and the opposition New Democratic Party retaining its three. However, the NDP saw a nearly 4-point swing in its share of the popular vote. Ralph Gonsalves remained Prime Minister.

== Campaign ==
A total of 34 candidates contested the elections; the Unity Labour Party and the New Democratic Party both fielded candidates in all 15 constituencies, whilst the Green Party nominated four candidates.

== Results ==
Party	Votes	%	Seats	+/–
Unity Labour Party	31,848	55.26	12	0
New Democratic Party	25,748	44.68	3	0
Green Party	34	0.06	0	New
Total	57,630	100.00	15	0
Valid votes	57,630	99.42		
Invalid/blank votes	338	0.58		
Total votes	57,968	100.00		
Registered voters/turnout	91,045	63.67		
Source: Electoral Office
