= 1972 Vincentian general election =

- 7 April 1972

13 seats in the House of Assembly 7 seats needed for a majority
- Registered: 42,707
- Turnout: 75.61% (▼6.94pp)

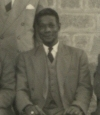

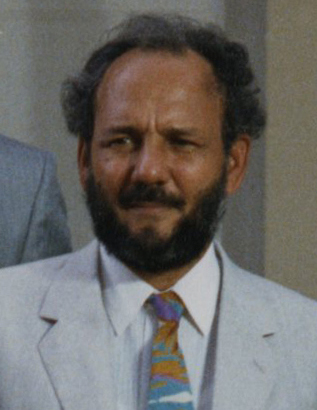
	First party	Second party	Third party
Leader	Milton Cato	Ebenezer Joshua	James Mitchell
Party	SVLP	PPP	Independent
Last election	53.78%, 6 seats	46.22%, 3 seats	–
Seats won	6	6	1
Seat change	Steady	▲3	New
Popular vote	16,108	14,507	1,330
Percentage	50.42%	45.41%	4.16%
Swing	▼3.36pp	▼0.81pp	New
- Results by constituency
Premier before election
Milton Cato
SVLP
Elected Premier
James Mitchell
Independent

General elections were held in Saint Vincent and the Grenadines on 7 April 1972. The result was a tie between the People's Political Party and the Saint Vincent Labour Party, which both won six seats. Despite being a former member of the SVLP (which had received a majority of the public vote), the sole independent MP James Fitz-Allen Mitchell formed a government with the PPP. Voter turnout was 75.6%.

== Results ==
Party	Votes	%	Seats	+/–
Saint Vincent Labour Party	16,108	50.42	6	0
People's Political Party	14,507	45.41	6	+3
Independents	1,330	4.16	1	New
Total	31,945	100.00	13	+4
Valid votes	31,945	98.93		
Invalid/blank votes	344	1.07		
Total votes	32,289	100.00		
Registered voters/turnout	42,707	75.61		
Source: Nohlen
