= 1994 Vincentian general election =

- 21 February 1994

15 of 23 seats in the House of Assembly 8 seats needed for a majority
- Registered: 71,954
- Turnout: 65.61% (▼6.77pp)
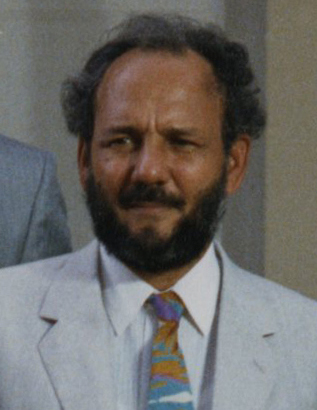

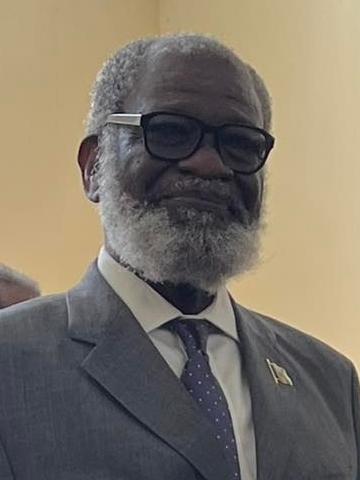

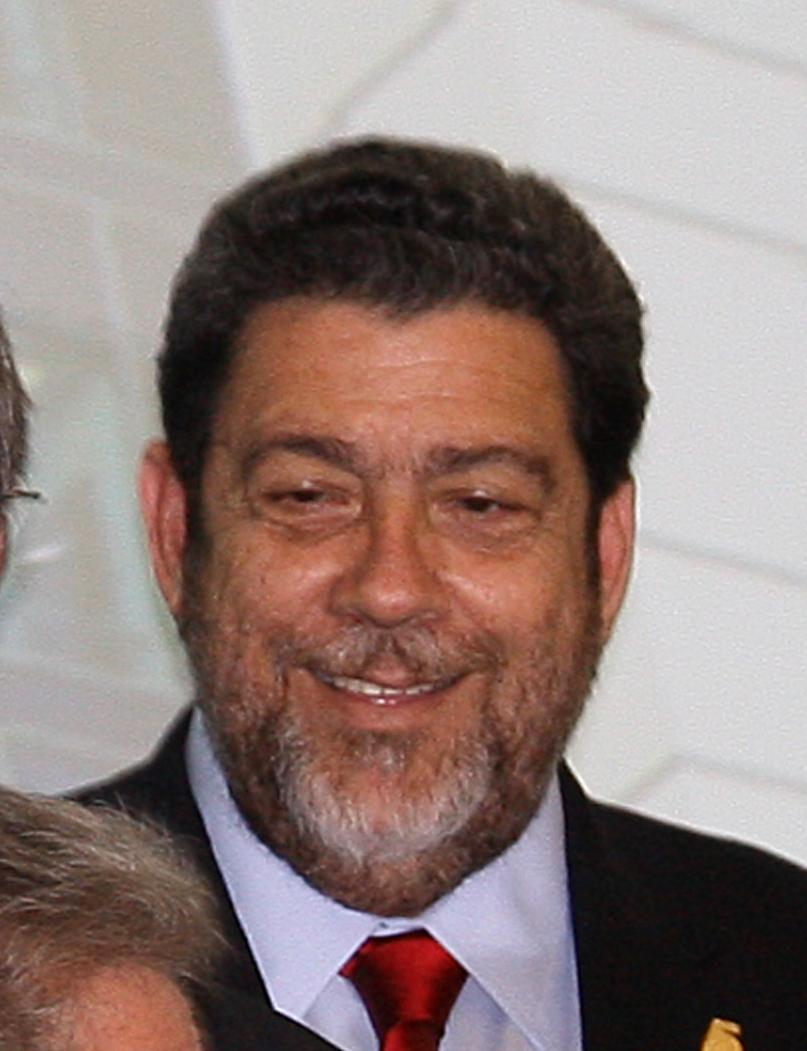
	First party	Second party	Third party
Leader	James Mitchell	Stanley John	Ralph Gonsalves
Party	New Democratic	SVLP	MNU
Last election	66.29%, 15 seats	30.30%, 0 seats	2.35%, 0 seats
Seats won	12	2	1
Seat change	▼3	▲2	▲1
Popular vote	25,789	12,455	8,178
Percentage	54.95%	26.54%	17.42%
Swing	▼11.34pp	▼3.76pp	▲15.07pp
- Results by constituency
Prime Minister before election
James Mitchell
New Democratic
Elected Prime Minister
James Mitchell

General elections were held in Saint Vincent and the Grenadines on 21 February 1994. The result was a victory for the New Democratic Party, which won twelve of the fifteen seats. Voter turnout was 66%.

== Results ==
Party	Votes	%	Seats	+/–
New Democratic Party	25,789	54.95	12	–3
Saint Vincent Labour Party	12,455	26.54	2	+2
Movement for National Unity	8,178	17.42	1	+1
Independents	512	1.09	0	0
Total	46,934	100.00	15	0
Valid votes	46,934	99.41		
Invalid/blank votes	278	0.59		
Total votes	47,212	100.00		
Registered voters/turnout	71,954	65.61		
Source: Electoral Office
