= Flambeau (magazine) =

Flambeau was an artistic and literary magazine in Saint Vincent. It was established in 1965 and published by the Kingstown Study Group.

Founders included Kenneth John, who edited the magazine with Daniel Williams.

Extracts from the magazine from 1965 to 1968 were republished in a pair of 2006 anthologies, Search For Identity and Quest For Caribbean Unity. A third anthology, Home Sweet Home, containing poems and short stories, was published in 2007.
