= Stanley John (politician) =

Governor-General of Saint Vincent and the Grenadines since 2026

His Excellency Sir Stanley John GCMG KC
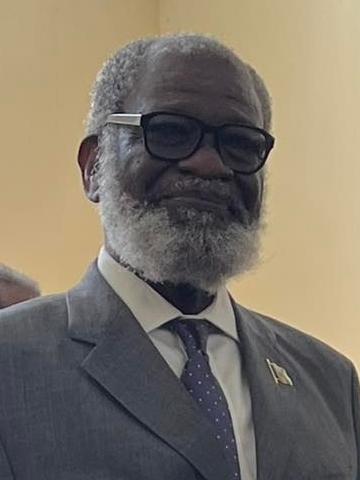
- John in 2026

Governor-General of Saint Vincent and the Grenadines
- Incumbent
- Assumed office 6 January 2026
- Monarch: Charles III
- Prime Minister: Godwin Friday
- Preceded by: Dame Susan Dougan

Member of Parliament
- In office 1998–2001
- Constituency: East St George

Senator of Saint Vincent and the Grenadines
- In office 1983–1989

Personal details
- Born: 1 June 1951 (age 75) Calliaqua, Saint Vincent
- Party: SVLP (until 1994); ULP (after 1994)
- Education: University College London
- Profession: Politician · lawyer

Sir Stanley Kendrick "Stalky" John, GCMG KC (born 1 June 1951) is a Vincentian politician and lawyer serving as Governor-General of Saint Vincent and the Grenadines since 6 January 2026.

== Biography ==
John was born on 1 June 1951 in Calliaqua, Saint Vincent. He attended the St. Vincent Grammar School and later University College London where he was enrolled at the Faculty of Laws, earning a Bachelor of Laws with honors in 1976. After that, he attended the Inns of Court School of Law and was admitted to the degree of utter barrister in 1977. He worked under Sir Louis Blom-Cooper before moving back to Saint Vincent in 1978, being admitted to practice law that year by the Eastern Caribbean Supreme Court.

John then served as a practicing lawyer in Saint Vincent and the Grenadines, being considered an expert on "constitutional law, commercial litigation, and international finance". He also "represented various foreign government agencies, banks, insurance companies, trusts and other domestic and international companies, in relation to matters pertaining to the laws of SVG". Additionally, John worked as an editor for The Star newspaper. In 2014, he was named a Queen's Counsel (QC).

John was a member of the Saint Vincent Labour Party (SVLP) until 1994, when it merged to become the Unity Labour Party (ULP). In 1983, he became a government senator in the House of Assembly of Saint Vincent and the Grenadines. The following year, he became an opposition senator, a post he held through 1989. He served as the leader of the SVLP from 1992 to 1994 and was elected a representative of East St George in the House of Assembly in 1998, serving through 2001. He focused mainly on law after his departure from the House of Assembly in 2001.

In January 2026, John was announced as the new Governor-General of Saint Vincent and the Grenadines to succeed Dame Susan Dougan, to assume office on 6 January 2026.

On 10 February 2026, it was published that John was appointed a Knight Grand Cross of Order of St Michael and St George (GCMG) on 30 December 2025, shortly before assuming the office of governor-general.

Government offices
Preceded by Dame Susan Dougan	Governor-General of Saint Vincent and the Grenadines; 2026–present	Incumbent
