= Mitchell/Sylvester Faction =

Saint Vincent and the Grenadines political party

The Mitchell/Sylvester Faction, also known as Junta, was a political party in Saint Vincent and the Grenadines. It was formed by James Fitz-Allen Mitchell and senior members of the People's Political Party and contested the 1974 general elections, receiving 16% of the vote and winning a single seat. However, it did not contest any further elections.
