= James Fitz-Allen Mitchell =

Vincentian politician (1931–2021)

The Right Honourable Sir James Fitz-Allen Mitchell KCMG
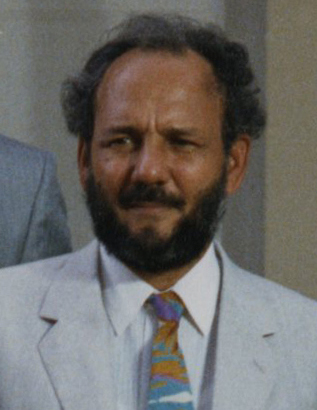
- Mitchell in 1986

2nd Prime Minister of Saint Vincent and the Grenadines
- In office 30 July 1984 – 27 October 2000
- Monarch: Elizabeth II
- Governors-General: Sir Sydney Gun-Munro; Sir Joseph Lambert Eustace; Sir David Emmanuel Jack; Charles Antrobus
- Preceded by: Milton Cato
- Succeeded by: Arnhim Eustace

2nd Premier of Saint Vincent
- In office 14 April 1972 – 8 December 1974
- Governor: Rupert Godfrey John
- Preceded by: Milton Cato
- Succeeded by: Milton Cato

Leader of the New Democratic Party
- In office 3 December 1975 – 27 October 2000
- Preceded by: Office established
- Succeeded by: Arnhim Eustace

Minister of Finance
- In office 30 July 1984 – 9 July 1998
- Prime Minister: himself
- Preceded by: Milton Cato
- Succeeded by: Arnhim Eustace

Personal details
- Born: 15 May 1931 Bequia, Saint Vincent, British Windward Islands (now Saint Vincent and the Grenadines)
- Died: 23 November 2021 (aged 90) Bequia, Saint Vincent and the Grenadines
- Party: New Democratic Party (from 1975)
- Other political affiliations: Saint Vincent Labour Party (until 1972)
- Spouse: Patricia Mae Parker (m. 1965)
- Children: 4
- Education: St. Vincent Grammar School; Imperial College of Tropical Agriculture; University of British Columbia

Sir James Fitz-Allen Mitchell KCMG PC (15 May 1931 – 23 November 2021) was a Vincentian politician who served as the second Prime Minister of Saint Vincent and the Grenadines from 1984 to 2000 and as the second Premier of Saint Vincent from 1972 to 1974. He founded the New Democratic Party (NDP) in 1975, and served as its president until 2000.

== Early life ==
Mitchell was born in Bequia on 15 May 1931. He was the oldest of four children born to Captain Reginald and Lois Mitchell. Reginald was lost at sea during a January 1940 voyage in the Bermuda Triangle. Lois remarried Alfred Baynes of Saint Lucia, leaving the children with their paternal grandmother Sarah. Some time after Mitchell left Bequia to enter St. Vincent Grammar School, his grandmother died; his younger siblings then joined their mother in Saint Lucia.

After studying for three years at the Imperial College of Tropical Agriculture in Trinidad and Tobago, Mitchell entered the University of British Columbia in 1954. He graduated with a bachelor's degree in agriculture in 1955, majoring in Plant Science, and continued for one year of graduate studies. After graduation, Mitchell worked as an agricultural research officer for the government in Saint Vincent and Saint Lucia, then joined the Ministry of Overseas Development in London as a scientific information officer. While in London, he married Patricia Mae Parker in 1965; they had three daughters.

== Political career ==
Mitchell initially entered politics in 1966 by winning a legislative seat as a candidate of the Saint Vincent Labour Party. He was the Minister of Agriculture from 1967 to 1972. In that year, Mitchell resigned from Labour and won re-election as an independent. He then became Premier with the support of the People's Political Party (PPP), serving from 1972 until 1974. After PPP leader Ebenezer Joshua withdrew his party's support, Mitchell formed the Mitchell/Sylvester Faction together with former PPP ministers Othniel Sylvester, Alphonso Dennie, and others. Although Mitchell was the only successful Faction candidate in 1974, they reorganized and founded the New Democratic Party (NDP) in 1975.

Mitchell and the NDP became the main parliamentary opposition. He was appointed leader of the opposition from November 1982 to December 1983. He served until the NDP's victory in the 1984 elections. Mitchell became Prime Minister, Minister of Finance and Foreign Affairs in July 1984 and was re-elected for a fourth successive term when his Party scored an 8–7 victory in the 1998 parliamentary elections.

Mitchell retired as Prime Minister and NDP President in 2000 but stayed on as Senior Minister until 2001. Mitchell was also foreign minister from 1984 until 1992 and a Privy Councillor beginning in 1985. He served as the Chairman of the OECS Authority in 1988, 1995, and 1996; at the 1995 meeting, Mitchell advocated for the inclusion of Barbados.

Mitchell led the Commonwealth observer team at the election in Lesotho in 2002. He also was a member of the InterAction Council.

== Political positions ==
Mitchell endorsed the Grenadines becoming a separate nation from St. Vincent: in a 1984 election campaign speech, he opined that the incumbent government was continuing the colonial policy of favouring St. Vincent. He also supported greater political integration of Caribbean countries. In 1987, at the eighth conference of heads of government in the Caribbean Community, he stated, "As I see it, we must have one flag, one anthem and freedom of movement of people, services and capital."

== Role as agronomist ==
During his time as prime minister, Mitchell co-founded the Caribbean Agricultural Regional Development Institute (CARDI).

In his opening address at the 1st Caribbean Agricultural Technology Conference (CATC) held in St Vincent and the Grenadines in 2000, Mitchell emphasized that "agriculture must thrive" and overcome regional challenges. Using the regional banana industry as an example, he pointed out that disruptions would affect not only farmers, but also related sectors such as transportation. To aid the industry, Mitchell outlined his government's policies to promote crop diversification as well as land redistribution to increase production.

Mitchell wrote on a variety of issues in agriculture and Caribbean society, included the topics of fungicide usage and land reform. His autobiography Beyond the Islands was published by Macmillan Caribbean in 2006.

== Illness, death and tributes ==
On 31 October 2021, Mitchell was admitted to Milton Cato Memorial Hospital in Saint Vincent due to multiple illnesses, including gallstone, kidney failure and an enlarged prostate. He was later diagnosed with dengue fever. He was then flown to Queen Elizabeth Hospital, Bridgetown in Barbados for advanced medical treatment on 3 November 2021, and was additionally diagnosed with pneumonia.

On 18 November 2021, he was transferred to Port Elizabeth Hospital in Bequia. He died there five days later, on 23 November, at the age of 90. Mitchell was the last living parliamentarian to have served at independence in 1979. The government of Saint Vincent and the Grenadines announced three days of national mourning through 25 November, with flags flown at half-mast. A state funeral will be held at a later date.

The OECS flag was flown at half-mast, while CARICOM and other regional leaders paid tributes to Mitchell. Sir Kennedy Simmonds, former Prime Minister of Saint Kitts and Nevis, recollected their collaborations for Caribbean integration.

Political offices
Preceded by Milton Cato	Premier of Saint Vincent; 1972–1974	Succeeded by Milton Cato
Preceded by Milton Cato	Prime Minister of Saint Vincent and the Grenadines; 1984–2000	Succeeded by Arnhim Eustace
Party political offices
New political party	Leader of the New Democratic Party; 1975–2000	Succeeded by Arnhim Eustace
