= Kenneth John =

Vincentian lawyer and newspaper columnist (1938–2021)

Kenneth Randolph Vincent John
- Born: April 17, 1938; Rose Place, Saint Vincent and the Grenadines
- Died: July 3, 2021 (aged 83)
- Education: University of the West Indies (B.Sc.) University of Manchester (Ph.D.)
- Occupations: Lawyer, newspaper columnist
- Known for: Founding Flambeau magazine, Contributions to Vincentian political thought
- Notable work: This Week (newspaper column)
- Political party: Democratic Freedom Movement

Kenneth Randolph Vincent John (17 April 1938 – 3 July 2021) was a Vincentian lawyer and newspaper columnist. His column "This Week" appeared in national weekly The Vincentian over a period of thirty-nine years.

== Biography ==
Kenneth Randolph Vincent John was born on 17 April 1938 in Rose Place. He received a B.Sc. in Government from the University of the West Indies in Mona, Jamaica, and a Ph.D. in Government from the University of Manchester. He also trained as a barrister.

From 1964 to 1967, he served as the first Resident Tutor for the University of the West Indies Department of Extra–Mural Studies (predecessor of the modern-day UWI Open Campus) in St Vincent and the Grenadines. During his time as Resident Tutor, he oversaw the introduction of 'O' Level examinations in rural areas of the country, and organised public lectures on regional and foreign affairs. He also founded the literary and political magazine Flambeau.

John, Parnel Campbell, Eddie Griffith, Kerwin Morris and John Cato founded the Education Forum of the People (EFP) in 1969. This organisation became the Democratic Freedom Movement party in 1974, with John as its leader. The new party participated in that year's elections, unsuccessfully contesting two seats. He later served as Chairman of the Public Services Commission. In December 1982, John began writing a column called "This Week" for The Vincentian. He wrote through 2019, and the paper continued with reprints of older columns.

John died on 3 July 2021. The National Archives and Documentation Centre featured John's writings and issues of Flambeau in its July monthly exhibition.

== Partial bibliography ==
- "Political Crisis in St. Vincent" (1967) New World III (3).
- "Joshua, Ebenezer" (2006) Encyclopedia of African-American Culture and History 3: 1202–1203.

=== As editor ===
- Search for Identity: Essays on St. Vincent and the Grenadines (2006)
- Quest for Caribbean Unity: Beyond Colonialism (2006)
- Home Sweet Home: Musings on Hairoun (2007)
