= 1957 Vincentian general election =

General elections were held in Saint Vincent and the Grenadines on 12 September 1957. The result was a victory for the People's Political Party, which won five of the eight seats. Voter turnout was 71%.

== Results ==
Party	Votes	%	Seats	+/–
People's Political Party	9,100	46.05	5	+2
Saint Vincent Labour Party	5,728	28.99	1	New
People's Liberation Movement	2,647	13.40	1	New
Independents	2,284	11.56	1	–4
Total	19,759	100.00	8	0
Valid votes	19,759	89.63		
Invalid/blank votes	2,285	10.37		
Total votes	22,044	100.00		
Registered voters/turnout	30,960	71.20		
Source: Electoral Office
