= Democratic Republican Party (Saint Vincent and the Grenadines) =

- Leader: Anesia Baptiste
- Founded: 23 August 2012
- Dissolved: 9 October 2020
- Ideology: Christian right Republicanism; Anti-communism
- Political position: Right-wing
- Seats in the House of Assembly: 0 / 15

Website
- https://www.facebook.com/DemocraticRepublicanPartySvg/

The Democratic Republican Party (DRP) was a minor political party in Saint Vincent and the Grenadines. The DRP was announced on 23 August 2012 by the founder Anesia Baptiste.

On 9 October 2020, the leader of the Democratic-Republican Party resigned from politics, effectively leaving the political party defunct.

The Democratic-Republican Party espoused both a belief in democracy as a means of electing government into the office and in republicanism. The party believes that the rights and freedoms of all of the people are inalienable or endowed by the Creator God and that the government's function is to protect these liberties of both the majority who elected it and minorities who did not elect it.

The DRP ran its first slate of six first time candidates for the 9 December 2015 general election. All six of these DRP nominees were political candidates for the first time.
