= Eighth Army of Liberation =

Defunct political party in Saint Vincent and the Grenadines

- Abbreviation: EAL
- Leader: George Hamilton Charles
- Founded: 1951
- Dissolved: 1952
- Preceded by: United Workers, Peasants and Ratepayers Union
- Ideology: Labourism; Christian socialism
- Political position: Center-left

The Eighth Army of Liberation was a political party in Saint Vincent and the Grenadines. It was formed by the United Workers, Peasants and Ratepayers Union. In the 1951 general elections it won all eight seats and formed the government.

However, in 1952 internal conflicts led to a breakaway faction forming the People's Political Party, and the Eighth Army did not contest any further elections.
