= Movement for National Unity =

St Vincent and the Grenadines political party (1984–1994)

The Movement for National Unity was a political party in Saint Vincent and the Grenadines. It was formed shortly before the 1984 general elections by a split from the United People's Movement due to the refusal of most party members to disown Fidel Castro's politics. Some of the support for the Movement for National Unity was the result of absorbing former members of the disbanded Youlou United Liberation Movement of the 1970s. The new party received 2.0% of the vote, but failed to win a seat. In the 1989 elections it increased its share of the vote to 2.4%, but remained seatless. However, in the 1994 elections it received 17.4% of the vote and won a single seat. In the same year it merged with the Saint Vincent Labour Party to form the Unity Labour Party.

== Election results ==
=== House of Assembly elections ===
Election	Leader	Votes	%	Seats	+/–	Position	Status
1984	Ralph Gonsalves	855	2.03%	0 / 13	Steady	▲4th	Extra-parliamentary
1989	Ralph Gonsalves	1,030	2.35%	0 / 15	Steady	▲3rd	Extra-parliamentary
1994	Ralph Gonsalves	8,178	17.42%	1 / 15	▲1	3rd	Opposition

== See also ==
- Youlou United Liberation Movement
