= Ebenezer Joshua =

Saint Vincent and the Grenadines politician (1908-1991)

Chief Minister of Saint Vincent
- In office 9 January 1960 – 30 May 1967
- Monarch: Elizabeth II
- Preceded by: position created
- Succeeded by: Milton Cato

Leader of the People's Political Party
- In office 1952–1980

Minister of Finance
- In office 25 May 1961 – 30 May 1967
- Prime Minister: himself
- Succeeded by: Milton Cato
- In office 4 May 1972 – 9 May 1974
- Prime Minister: James Fitz-Allen Mitchell
- Preceded by: Milton Cato
- Succeeded by: Milton Cato

Personal details
- Born: 23 May 1908 Kingstown, British Windward Islands (present day Saint Vincent and the Grenadines)
- Died: 14 March 1991 (aged 82) Kingstown, Saint Vincent and the Grenadines
- Party: People's Political Party; Eighth Army of Liberation (1951–1952)
- Spouse: Ivy Joshua

Ebenezer Theodore Joshua (23 May 1908 – 14 March 1991) was a Vincentian politician and the first chief minister of Saint Vincent from 1960 to 1967. He was the Leader of the Legislative Council from 1956 to 1961.

== Early life and career ==
Joshua was born in Kingstown, Saint Vincent, British Windward Islands. As a young man in the 1920s, he went to work on the nearby island of Trinidad. There he became involved in trade unionism with Buzz Butler, and was an official of the Oilfields Workers' Trade Union from 1938 until 1950, when he tried unsuccessfully to be elected to the Trinidad legislature. Returning to Saint Vincent, Joshua entered politics, and was elected to the island's assembly in 1951 as a member of the Eighth Army of Liberation. In 1952 he and his wife Ivy Joshua founded the People's Political Party (PPP) as the political arm of the Federated Industrial Allied Workers Union (FIAWU), a trade union organization aimed at representing agricultural and shipyard workers. The party was staunchly against colonialism and the plantocracy.

== Politics ==
In 1957, Ebenezer and Ivy became the first married couple to be elected to a parliament of the British West Indies. In 1961, upon Saint Vincent and the Grenadines gaining increased autonomy, Joshua became chief minister. He held the additional portfolio of minister of finance. His PPP saw continued success in subsequent elections. Joshua supported the unsuccessful Federation of the West Indies. In 1962 Joshua discontinued government subsidies for the sugar growers, leading the Mt Bentinck Sugar Cane Factory to close after years of financial mismanagement. He then travelled to Barbados for a regional meeting on agricultural problems; a misunderstanding of this sequence of events and Vincentian history by American musician Eric von Schmidt became the basis for the song "Joshua Gone Barbados".

In 1967 the PPP lost their parliamentary majority and Joshua was succeeded by Robert Milton Cato, leader of the Saint Vincent Labour Party. He was appointed leader of the opposition from 1967 to 1972. After the 1972 elections, Joshua was appointed Deputy Premier and Minister of Finance in the cabinet of James Fitz-Allen Mitchell. He resigned in 1974.

Joshua remained in parliament, but the PPP began to decline as the New Democratic Party emerged as political competition. In 1979 the PPP lost all parliamentary representation. Joshua resigned as party leader in 1980, and the party was dissolved in 1984.

== Personal life ==
In 1980, Joshua became a member of the Church of Jesus Christ of Latter-day Saints (LDS Church). He served for a time in the presidency of the LDS Church's Kingstown Branch, then the only congregation of the church in Saint Vincent and the Grenadines.

== Death and legacy ==
Joshua died in Kingstown, Saint Vincent, on 14 March 1991.

The Arnos Vale Airport was renamed as the E. T. Joshua Airport in his honour. After the closure of this airport in 2017, the former passenger terminal building was renovated and now houses a shopping plaza known as The Joshua Centre.

Political offices
Preceded by position created	Chief Minister of Saint Vincent; 1960–1967	Succeeded by Milton Cato
