= Unity Labour Party =

Political party in Saint Vincent and the Grenadines

- Leader: Ralph Gonsalves
- Founded: 16 October 1994; 31 years ago
- Merger of: Saint Vincent Labour Party; Movement for National Unity
- Ideology: Democratic socialism Left-wing nationalism Anti-imperialism; Republicanism
- Political position: Left-wing
- Regional affiliation: COPPPAL (observer); São Paulo Forum (affiliate)
- International affiliation: Socialist International (1994–2014)
- Seats in the House of Assembly: 1 / 15

Website
- https://voteulp.com/

The Unity Labour Party (ULP) is a democratic socialist political party in Saint Vincent and the Grenadines. It was the ruling party from 2001 to 2025 under the premiership of Ralph Gonsalves.

The party is an observer of COPPPAL and an affiliate of Foro de São Paulo. From 1994 to 2014, the party was a member of Socialist International.

== History ==
The party was formed in 1994 from the merger of the Saint Vincent Labour Party and the Movement for National Unity. The parties had run as an alliance in the elections earlier that year, promising voters that they would merge after the election regardless of the result. In the 1998 elections they received 54.6% of the vote, but the New Democratic Party won a majority of seats. The first leader of ULP, Sir Vincent Beache, resigned after the elections, and was succeeded by Ralph Gonsalves. However, in the 2001 general election the ULP won its first parliamentary majority, winning twelve of the fifteen seats. The party won another majority in the 2005 general election. The party was narrowly re-elected in the 2010 general election, winning 8 out of 15 elected seats in the House of Assembly of Saint Vincent and the Grenadines and the same taking place in the 2015 general elections and was re-elected in the 2020 general election, this time winning 9 out of 15 seats but lost the popular vote to the New Democratic Party.

In November 2020, Prime Minister Gonsalves made history by securing the fifth consecutive victory of his ULP in the general election. In the 2025 Vincentian general election, the party was defeated by Godwin Friday's NDP, with Gonsalves retaining the only winning seat of the ULP.

== Election results ==
=== House of Assembly elections ===
Election	Party leader	Votes	%	Seats	+/–	Position	Result
1998	Vincent Beache	28,025	54.60%	7 / 15	▲4	2nd	Opposition
2001	Ralph Gonsalves	32,925	56.49%	12 / 15	▲5	▲1st	Supermajority government
2005	Ralph Gonsalves	31,848	55.26%	12 / 15	Steady	1st	Supermajority government
2010	Ralph Gonsalves	32,099	51.11%	8 / 15	▼4	1st	Majority government
2015	Ralph Gonsalves	34,246	52.28%	8 / 15	Steady	1st	Majority government
2020	Ralph Gonsalves	32,419	49.59%	9 / 15	▲1	1st	Majority government
2025	Ralph Gonsalves	27,152	42.14%	1 / 15	▼8	2nd	Opposition
