= People's Political Party (Saint Vincent and the Grenadines) =

- Abbreviation: PPP
- Leader: Ebenezer Joshua
- Founded: 1952
- Dissolved: 1984
- Split from: Eighth Army of Liberation
- Ideology: Populism; Social conservatism Labourism (early)
- Political position: Centre-right; Centre-left (early)

The People's Political Party was a political party in Saint Vincent and the Grenadines. It was established in 1952 as a breakaway from the ruling Eighth Army of Liberation, and was the country's first lasting nationwide political party. It was the only party to contest the 1954 general elections and received three of the eight seats (the remaining seats were won by independents). In the 1957 elections it received almost half the national vote and won five of the eight seats. In 1961 it remained in power with six of the nine seats.

In the 1966 elections it received fewer votes than the Saint Vincent Labour Party, but won one seat more. However, in early elections the following year it was reduced to three seats. After both parties won six seats in the 1972 elections, early elections were held in 1974. Prior to the election several senior members of the party formed the Mitchell/Sylvester Faction. The PPP's opposition to independence from the United Kingdom saw it reduced to just two seats, whilst the Labour Party won ten. In the 1979 elections it failed to win a seat, and was dissolved in 1984.

== Election results ==
=== House of Assembly elections ===
Election	Leader	Votes	%	Seats	+/–	Position	Status
1954	Ebenezer Joshua	6,301	40.3%	3 / 8	New	1st	Minority government
1957	Ebenezer Joshua	9,100	46.1%	5 / 9	▲2	1st	Majority government
1961	Ebenezer Joshua	11,500	49.2%	6 / 9	▲1	1st	Supermajority government
1966	Ebenezer Joshua	13,427	49.0%	5 / 9	▼1	1st	Majority government
1967	Ebenezer Joshua	12,465	46.2%	3 / 9	▼2	▼2nd	Opposition
1972	Ebenezer Joshua	14,507	45.4%	6 / 13	▲3	2nd	PPP-Ind coalition government
1974	Ebenezer Joshua	3,806	13.4%	2 / 13	▼4	▼3rd	Opposition
1979	Ebenezer Joshua	1,492	4.5%	0 / 15	▼2	▼4th	Extra-parliamentary
