= Saint Vincent Labour Party =

Political party in Saint Vincent and the Grenadines

The Saint Vincent Labour Party was a social democratic political party in Saint Vincent and the Grenadines from 1955 to 1994. It was the ruling party from 1967 to 1972 and again from 1974 until 1984.

== History ==
The party was established in 1955. In the 1957 general elections it received 29.0% of the vote, putting it in second place and winning one seat. In the 1961 elections the party received 47.9% of the vote and three seats, losing by only 336 votes to the ruling People's Political Party, who won nine seats. In the 1966 elections they received 50.9% of the vote, but the PPP won five seats to the Labour Party's four. However, early elections the following year saw the Labour Party increase their vote share to 53.8% and take six of the nine seats.

Despite receiving over 50% of the vote again in 1972, the elections resulted in a tie with both parties winning six seats. The sole independent candidate, James Fitz-Allen Mitchell formed a government with his former party, the PPP, and was appointed prime minister. However, a further set of early elections in 1974 saw the Labour Party claim 69.0% of the vote and win ten of the thirteen seats. They remained in power following the 1979 elections, but lost the 1984 elections to the New Democratic Party. In the 1989 elections the NDP won all 15 seats. The Labour Party regained two seats in the 1994 elections, and on 16 October 1994 they merged with the Movement for National Unity to form the Unity Labour Party.

== Party Leadership ==
- Milton Cato, 1955 - 1985
- Hudson K. Tannis, January 1985 - 3 August 1986
- Vincent Beache, 3 August 1986 - September 1992
- Stanley 'Stalky' John, 1992 - 1994
- Vincent Beache, 1994

== Electoral history ==
=== House of Assembly elections ===
Election	Party leader	Votes	%	Seats	+/–	Position	Result
1957	Milton Cato	5,728	29.0%	1 / 8	▲1		Opposition
1961	Milton Cato	11,164	47.9%	3 / 9	▲3	▲2nd	Opposition
1966	Milton Cato	13,930	50.9%	4 / 9	▲1	2nd	Opposition
1967	Milton Cato	14,501	53.8%	6 / 9	▲2	▲1st	Supermajority government
1972	Milton Cato	16,108	50.4%	6 / 13	Steady	1st	Opposition
1974	Milton Cato	19,579	69.0%	10 / 13	▲4	1st	Supermajority government
1979	Milton Cato	17,876	54.2%	11 / 13	▲1	1st	Supermajority government
1984	Milton Cato	17,493	41.5	4 / 15	▼7	▼2nd	Opposition
1989	Vincent Beache	13,290	30.3%	0 / 15	▼4	2nd	Extra-parliamentary
1994	Stanley John	12,455	26.5%	2 / 15	▲2	2nd	Opposition
