= Milton Cato =

Prime Minister of Saint Vincent and the Grenadines (1915–1997)

The Right Honourable Milton Cato, PC
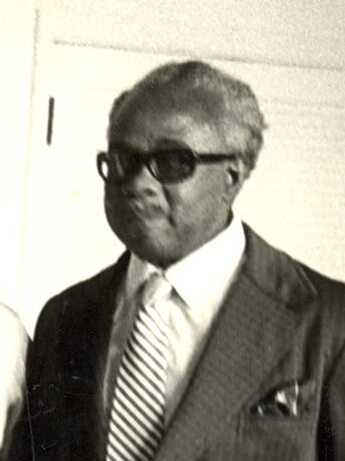
- Cato in 1982

1st Prime Minister of Saint Vincent and the Grenadines
- In office 27 October 1979 – 30 July 1984
- Monarch: Elizabeth II
- Governor General: Sir Sydney Gun-Munro
- Preceded by: Himself (As Premier)
- Succeeded by: Sir James Fitz-Allen Mitchell

1st Premier of Saint Vincent
- In office 8 December 1974 – 27 October 1979
- Monarch: Elizabeth II
- Governor: Rupert Godfrey John; Sir Sydney Gun-Munro
- Preceded by: Sir James Fitz-Allen Mitchell
- Succeeded by: Himself (As Prime Minister)
- In office 27 October 1969 – 13 April 1972
- Monarch: Elizabeth II
- Governor: Hywel George; Rupert Godfrey John
- Preceded by: Himself (As Chief Minister)
- Succeeded by: Sir James Fitz-Allen Mitchell

2nd Chief Minister of Saint Vincent
- In office 30 May 1967 – 27 October 1969
- Monarch: Elizabeth II
- Administrator: Hywel George
- Preceded by: Ebenezer Joshua
- Succeeded by: Himself (As Premier)

Minister of Finance
- In office 30 May 1967 – 14 April 1972
- Prime Minister: himself
- Preceded by: Ebenezer Joshua
- Succeeded by: Ebenezer Joshua
- In office 8 December 1974 – 30 July 1984
- Prime Minister: himself
- Preceded by: Ebenezer Joshua
- Succeeded by: James Fitz-Allen Mitchell

Personal details
- Born: 3 June 1915 Saint Vincent, British Windward Islands
- Died: 10 February 1997 (aged 81) Saint Vincent and the Grenadines
- Party: Saint Vincent Labour Party

Robert Milton Cato, PC, (3 June 1915 – 10 February 1997) was a socialist Vincentian politician who served as the first Prime Minister of Saint Vincent and the Grenadines, and also held the offices Premier of Saint Vincent and Chief Minister of Saint Vincent before independence. Cato was the leader of the Saint Vincent Labour Party, and led the country through independence in 1979.

== Life and career ==
Robert Milton Cato was born in Saint Vincent, British Windward Islands on 3 June 1915. He attended the St. Vincent Grammar School from 1928 to 1933. On leaving school, the young Cato was articled to a Barrister-at-law in Kingstown, and began his career in law and was called to the Bar, Middle Temple in 1948. In 1945, he joined the First Canadian Army, attained the rank of Sergeant and gave active service in the Second World War in France, Belgium, Holland and Germany. Robert Milton Cato was married to Lucy-Ann Alexandra Cato.

After returning to Saint Vincent, Cato became involved in politics. In 1955, he co-founded the Saint Vincent Labour Party.

Elected to the office of Chief Minister on 19 May 1967, as head of the St. Vincent Labour Party, Mr. Cato did much to improve the economic standing of the island. He was St. Vincent's first Premier in the island's entry to Statehood on 27 October 1969. Cato held the additional portfolio of Minister of Finance. He was out of government during the period 1972 to 1974 following his party's defeat. Cato's Labour Party lost elections in 1972 and the opposition leader, James Fitz-Allen Mitchell became Premier. Cato was appointed leader of the opposition from 1972 to 1974. Cato's party and its coalition partners won elections in 1974, and he became the premier and minister of finance again.

Robert Milton Cato led Saint Vincent and the Grenadines to complete independence from Britain on 27 October 1979, and is known as 'The Father of Independence'. He took the offices of Prime Minister and Minister of Finance.

Mr. Cato, the longtime representative of the West St. George Constituency, was appointed leader of the opposition from August to November 1984 following his party's defeat in the general elections. He then retired from active politics. He died on 10 February 1997 at the age of 81. His hope was for unity in Vincentian society and a brighter future for the people. The Kingstown General Hospital was renamed The Milton Cato Memorial Hospital in his honour in October 2000.

In July 2026 the Eastern Caribbean Central Bank announced that Cato would feature on the new 5 dollar banknote alongside the Grenadian athlete Sir Kirani James.

Political offices
Preceded by Ebenezer Joshua	Chief Minister of Saint Vincent; 1967–1969	Succeeded by office ended
Preceded by	Premier of Saint Vincent; 1969–1972	Succeeded by Sir James Fitz-Allen Mitchell
Preceded by Sir James Fitz-Allen Mitchell	Premier of Saint Vincent; 1974–1979	Succeeded by office ended
Preceded by office created	Prime Minister of Saint Vincent and the Grenadines; 1979–1984	Succeeded by Sir James Fitz-Allen Mitchell
