= New Democratic Party (Saint Vincent and the Grenadines) =

- President: Godwin Friday
- Chairperson: Linton Lewis
- Founded: 3 December 1975
- Preceded by: Junta
- Headquarters: Democrat House, Kingstown
- Ideology: Moderate conservatism Pro-Commonwealth realm
- Political position: Centre-right
- Regional affiliation: Caribbean Democrat Union
- International affiliation: International Democracy Union
- Seats in the House of Assembly: 14 / 15

Website
- https://www.ndpsvg.com/

The New Democratic Party (NDP) is a moderate conservative political party in Saint Vincent and the Grenadines. The party is led by Prime Minister Godwin Friday, and as of 2025 holds a supermajority in the House of Assembly.

== History ==
The New Democratic Party was founded in Kingstown, Saint Vincent and the Grenadines, on 3 December 1975. Its first leader was Sir James Fitz-Allen Mitchell, commonly referred to by his peers as Son Mitchell.

In 1979, the party contested the general elections and won two seats in the then 13-seat parliament.

Five years later, the NDP won with nine of the thirteen seats, making Mitchell the country's second prime minister. By way of a by-election, when the Labour Party leader Robert Milton Cato closed the last chapter of his political book, the NDP gained an additional seat advantage.

As of 2025, the NDP is the first and only Vincentian political party to have won all the seats in a national election, doing so in 1989.

The development of the banana and tourism industries has been a major pillar of economic development for Saint Vincent, spearheaded by the NDP.

When Mitchell departed elective politics, Arnhim Eustace was elected president of the NDP and subsequently became the third prime minister. He served as Leader of the Parliamentary Opposition from 2001 to 2016. Under Eustace's leadership, the NDP expanded and became more democratic, with the central executive and party delegates becoming more involved in the election and selection of the party's executive members.

In 2016 Eustace resigned, and since then the party has been led by Godwin Friday. Under Friday's leadership, the party had a lacklustre result in the 2020 general election. However, the party won 14 of 15 seats in the House of Assembly following the 2025 general election, forming a government for the first time since 1998.

== Election results ==
=== House of Assembly elections ===
Election	Party leader	Votes	%	Seats	+/–	Position	Result
1979	James Mitchell	9,022	27.4%	2 / 13	▲2	▲2nd	Opposition
1984	James Mitchell	21,700	51.4%	9 / 13	▲7	▲1st	Majority government
1989	James Mitchell	29,079	66.3%	15 / 15	▲6	1st	Supermajority government
1994	James Mitchell	25,789	54.9%	12 / 15	▼3	1st	Supermajority government
1998	James Mitchell	23,258	45.4%	8 / 15	▼4	1st	Majority government
2001	Arnhim Eustace	23,844	40.9%	3 / 15	▼5	▼2nd	Opposition
2005	Arnhim Eustace	25,748	44.68%	3 / 15	Steady	2nd	Opposition
2010	Arnhim Eustace	30,568	48.67%	7 / 15	▲4	2nd	Opposition
2015	Arnhim Eustace	31,027	47.37%	7 / 15	Steady	2nd	Opposition
2020	Godwin Friday	32,900	50.33%	6 / 15	▼1	2nd	Opposition
2025	Godwin Friday	37,207	57.74%	14 / 15	▲8	▲1st	Supermajority government
