= Cabinet of Saint Vincent and the Grenadines =

National government

The cabinet of Saint Vincent and the Grenadines is appointed by the governor-general on the advice of the prime minister.

== Current cabinet as of 2025 ==
Office	Name
Prime Minister, Minister of Finance, Legal Affairs & Justice, Economic Planning and Private Sector Development	Godwin Friday
Deputy Prime Minister and Minister of National Security and Immigration	St Clair Leacock
Minister of Health and Wellness and Energy	Daniel Cummings
Minister of Housing, Urban Development, Land Management and Informal Settlement Upgrading	Andrew John
Minister of Fisheries, Marine Conservation and Climate Resilience	Conroy Huggins
Minister of Foreign Affairs, Foreign Trade, Foreign Investment and Diaspora Affairs	Fitzgerald Bramble
Minister of Agriculture, Forestry and Rural Transformation	Israel Bruce
Minister of Youth, Sport, Culture and Creative Industries	Kaschaka Cupid
Minister of Tourism and Maritime Affairs	Kishore Shallow
Minister of the Family, Gender Affairs, Persons with Disability, Occupational Safety and Labour	Laverne Gibson-Velox
Minister of Transport, Infrastructure and Physical Planning	Nigel Stephenson
Minister of Education, Vocational Training, Innovation and Digital Transformation	Phillip Jackson
Minister of Social Welfare and Community Empowerment, Disaster Management and National Heritage	Shevern John
Senator and Minister of State in the Office of the Prime Minister	Chieftain Neptune
Senator and Minister of State in the Ministry of Education, Vocational Training, Innovation and Digital Transformation	Laverne King
Minister of Higher Education, Grenadines Affairs, Local Government, Airport and Seaport	Terrance Ollivierre
Attorney General	Sarah Louise Mitchell

== Previous cabinets ==
=== 2021 cabinet ===
Office	Name
Prime Minister	Ralph Gonsalves
Deputy Prime Minister	Montgomery Daniel
Attorney General	Grenville Williams
Minister of Agriculture, Forestry, Fisheries, Rural Transformation, Industry & Labour	Saboto Caesar
Minister of Foreign Affairs, Foreign Trade and Consumer Affairs	Frederick Stephenson
Minister of Health, Wellness and the Environment	St. Clair Prince
Minister of Finance, Economic Planning and Information Technology	Camillo Gonsalves
Minister of Urban Development, Energy, Seaports Development, Seaports Administration, Grenadines Affairs and Local Government	Benarva Browne
Minister of Housing, Informal Human Settlement, Youth and Sports	Orando Brewster
Minister of Education	Curtis King
Minister of Tourism, Civil Aviation, Sustainable Development and Culture	Carlos James
Minister of National Mobilisation, Social Development, Family, Gender Affairs and Persons with Disabilities	Keisal Melissa Peters

=== 2012 cabinet ===
As of 28 March 2012.

Office	Name
Governor General	Frederick Ballantyne
Prime Minister	Ralph Gonsalves
Deputy Prime Minister	Girlyn Miguel
Minister of Agriculture, Industry, Forestry, Fisheries, & Rural Transformation	Saboto Caesar
Minister of Education	Girlyn Miguel
Minister of Finance	Ralph Gonsalves
Minister of Foreign Affairs, Foreign Trade, & Consumer Affairs	Douglas Slater
Minister of Grenadines Affairs	Ralph Gonsalves
Minister of Health, Wellness, & the Environment	Clayton Burgin
Minister of Housing, Informal Human Settlements, Lands & Surveys, & Physical Planning	Montgomery Daniel
Minister of National Mobilization, Social Development, the Family, Persons With Disabilities, & Youth	Frederick Stevenson
Minister of National Reconciliation, the Public Service, Labor, Information, & Ecclesiastical Affairs	Maxwell Charles
Minister of National Security	Ralph Gonsalves
Minister of Tourism, Sports, & Culture	Cecil McKie
Minister of Transport, Works, Urban Development, & Local Govt	Julian Francis
Attorney General	Judith Jones-Morgan
Ambassador to the US	La Celia Aritha Prince
Permanent representative to the UN, New York	Camillo Gonsalves

== See also ==
- Politics of Saint Vincent and the Grenadines
