= 2020 Vincentian general election =

- 5 November 2020

15 of 23 seats in the House of Assembly 8 seats needed for a majority
- Registered: 98,119
- Turnout: 66.95% (▼6.44pp)
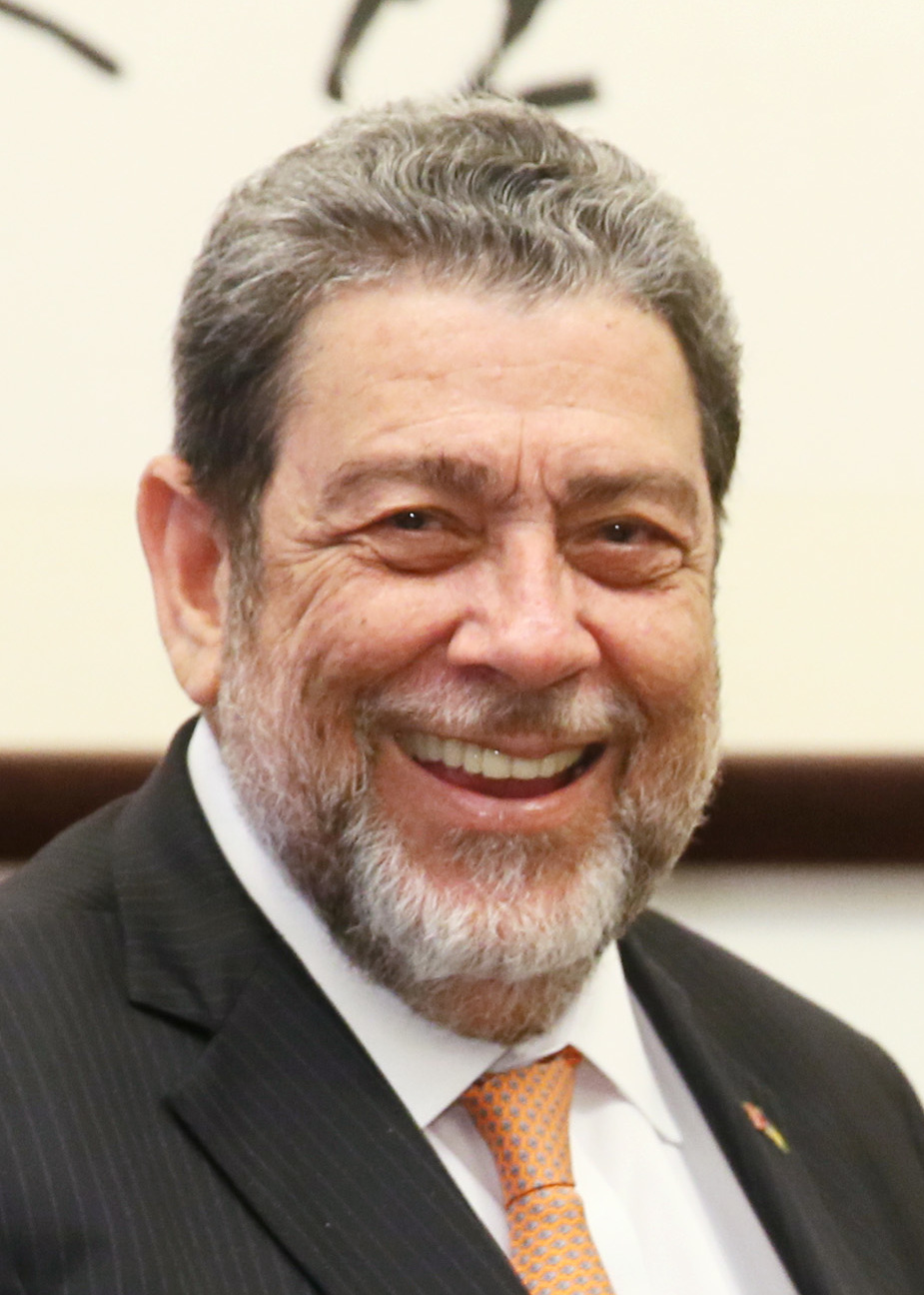

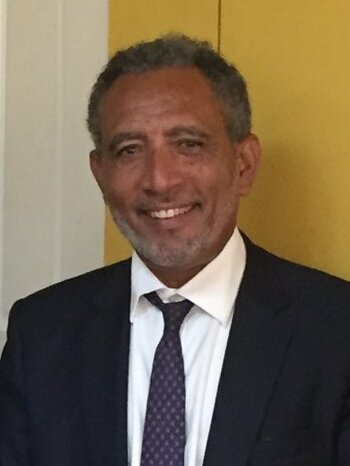
	First party	Second party
Leader	Ralph Gonsalves	Godwin Friday
Party	Unity Labour	New Democratic
Leader since	6 December 1998	27 November 2016
Leader's seat	North Central Windward	Northern Grenadines
Last election	52.28%, 8 seats	47.37%, 7 seats
Seats won	9	6
Seat change	▲1	▼1
Popular vote	32,419	32,900
Percentage	49.59%	50.33%
Swing	▼2.69pp	▲2.96pp
- Results by constituency
Prime Minister before election
Ralph Gonsalves
Unity Labour
Elected Prime Minister
Ralph Gonsalves
Unity Labour

General elections were held in Saint Vincent and the Grenadines on 5 November 2020. Nomination day was 20 October 2020. The result was a victory for the Unity Labour Party, its fifth in a row; the party won nine of the fifteen seats, gaining one seat. These elections marked the first time since 1998 that the party which received the most votes did not win the most seats and the first time since 1994 that the New Democratic Party won the popular vote.

== Electoral system ==
The 15 elected members of the House of Assembly are elected in single-member constituencies using the first-past-the-post system. A further six members are appointed: four by the government and two by the opposition.

As the previous elections had been held in 2015, the current elections were constitutionally required to be held by March 2021. While the previous three elections had been held in December, PM Ralph Gonsalves chose to hold this election in November.

== Background ==
Several minor parties decided not to contest the elections. The SVG Party and the United Progressive Party both ended their campaigns before Nomination Day. The leader of the Democratic Republican Party, Anesia Baptiste, announced her resignation on 9 October; she also stated that the party would not participate in the upcoming elections.

=== Contesting parties ===
Party	Position	Ideology	Leader (since)	Slogan and Manifesto	Campaign Songs
Unity Labour Party (ULP)	Centre-left to left-wing	Democratic socialism Agrarian socialism Republicanism	Ralph Gonsalves (December 1998)	"Lifting SVG higher."	Playlist available
New Democratic Party (NDP)	Centre-right	Conservatism; Pro-Commonwealth	Godwin Friday (November 2016)	"Let's get SVG working."	Playlist available
Saint Vincent and the Grenadines Green Party (GP)	Left-wing	Environmentalism; Green politics Nationalism	Ivan O'Neal (January 2005)	"VOTE GREEN for a strong economy and competent leadership."	

=== Unity Labour Party ===
The ULP campaigned for a record fifth term in power, with PM Gonsalves dubbing himself the "5-Star General". Gonsalves pointed to the Argyle International Airport and the Canouan Airport as examples of the party's record in improving infrastructure. He criticized the NDP for supporting Citizenship by investment (CBI), and later alleged that foreign strategists were directing the NDP campaign and spying on the ULP. In contrast to the "foreign influences" of the NDP, Gonsalves emphasized that the ULP's party manifesto had "come from the bowels of the people of this country". He explained that new foreign investments in hotels and airports would allow the SVG to remain the sole country in the Organisation of Eastern Caribbean States without a CBI program.

Gonsalves' son Camillo, the incumbent East St. George MP, criticized the NDP for nominating a returning emigrant like Fitzgerald Bramble, rather than someone who had been living in the country more recently.

=== New Democratic Party ===
After leading the NDP in the four previous elections, former PM Arnhim Eustace stepped down as party president in 2016, and retired from the Assembly in 2020.

The new leader Godwin Friday criticized the ULP's cronyism and its inability to improve the country over its 19 years in power: while the ULP leaders benefited from government projects, the average citizen faced rising costs-of-living and an unemployment rate of over 30 percent. This situation led many young Vincentians to emigrate, further handicapping development. To combat this, Friday proposed several incentives, such as decreasing the national VAT rate and the interest rate on student loans and reforming the port customs system. He also proposed an increase in the minimum stipend for workers in the national service.

While the NDP had been advocating for the country to switch recognition from Taiwan to China since 2016, the party moderated its stance after meeting with Vincentians currently studying in Taiwan on scholarship. Instead, the party indicated that it would maintain ties with Taiwan in return for increased investment in SVG.

Shevern John, the NDP candidate for North Windward, was denied leave from her job as a schoolteacher in order to contest the election, a benefit specified in the collective bargaining agreement between the SVG Teachers' Union (SVGTU) and the Public Service Commission (PSC). She was forced to resign instead. In 2010, three teachers wanting to run as NDP candidates had also been forced to resign; the SVGTU obtained a court decision in the teachers' favour, but the PSC had not reinstated the teachers as of 2020.

=== SVG Green Party ===
In its statements, the GP criticized both the ULP and the NDP for their overreliance on the tourism industry. The party promised free university education and wireless internet for all citizens. In addition, the GP proposed Green economy initiatives in order to encourage more-sustainable economic growth and provide better jobs for the local population. The initial funding for these initiatives would come from abolishing loopholes such as the "Mustique Act", which granted the (mostly foreign) residents of Mustique exemptions from tax and customs duties. Being smaller than the other two parties, the GP signalled support for joining a coalition government.

== Candidates ==
33 candidates were nominated in total: 15 each from the ULP and the NDP, 2 from the Saint Vincent and the Grenadines Green Party, and one ULP member running as an independent in South Leeward.

Constituency	ULP	NDP	GP	Incumbent
Central Kingstown	Dominic Sutherland	St Clair Leacock		St Clair Leacock
Central Leeward	Orlando Brewster	Benjamin Exeter		Louis Straker
East Kingstown	Luke Brown	Dwight Fitzgerald Bramble		Arnhim Eustace
East St. George	Camillo Gonsalves	Laverne Gibson-Velox	Ivan O'Neal	Camillo Gonsalves
Marriaqua	St. Clair Prince	Bernard Wylie		St. Clair Prince
North Central Windward	Ralph Gonsalves	Chieftain Neptune	Kadmiel McFee	Ralph Gonsalves
North Leeward	Carlos James	Roland Mathews		Roland Mathews
North Windward	Montgomery Daniel	Shevern John		Montgomery Daniel
Northern Grenadines	Carlos Williams	Godwin L. Friday		Godwin L. Friday
South Central Windward	Saboto Caesar	Israel Bruce		Saboto Caesar
South Leeward	Minerva Glasgow (Note: ULP member Asordo Bennett is also running in this constituency as an independent.)	Nigel Stephenson		Nigel Stephenson
South Windward	Frederick Stephenson	Noel Dickson		Frederick Stephenson
Southern Grenadines	Edwin Snagg	Terrance Ollivierre		Terrance Ollivierre
West Kingstown	Deborah Charles	Daniel Cummings		Daniel Cummings
West St. George	Curtis King	Kay Bacchus-Baptiste		Cecil Mckie

=== Marginal seats ===
Unity Labour Party			New Democratic Party		
Constituency		2015 majority	Constituency		2015 majority
1	North Leeward	0.21%	1	Central Leeward	5.13%
2	South Leeward	1.61%	2	North Windward	5.13%
3	East Kingstown	2.26%	3	East St. George	7.79%
4	West Kingstown	7.02%	4	West St. George	8.40%
5	Central Kingstown	7.77%	5	South Central Windward	10.16%
6	Southern Grenadines	15.31%	6	Marriaqua	12.17%
7	Northern Grenadines	34.44%	7	South Windward	12.58%
			8	North Central Windward	42.84%
Source: 2015 SVG General Elections Report - Electoral Office

== Results ==
For the first time since 1998, the ULP did not win the popular vote. However, the ULP saw their majority increase by one seat, North Leeward, which the ULP won by 7 votes. All other seats remained in the hands of the party previously holding them. The NDP candidate for North Leeward, Roland "Patel" Matthews, requested a recount. Some ballots from both sides were rejected in the recount; the final tally showed the ULP winning by 1 vote.

The NDP won the popular vote by 481 votes by running up its vote totals in seats it already held. However, the ULP edged out multiple victories in close seats, meaning they retained their majority. As many of the NDP's votes came from their safe seats, those votes were effectively wasted and could not contribute to their seat total.

The National Monitoring and Consultative Mechanism (NMCM), a domestic election observer, judged the election to be free and fair overall. This was corroborated by a CARICOM observer mission.

Gonsalves was sworn in for his fifth term on 7 November, with Montgomery Daniel sworn in as Deputy Prime Minister. The Governor-General, Susan Dougan, congratulated Gonsalves on his record win; she then reminded him to "create a structure for healing" society after the election, reaching out to opposition supporters as well as his own.

Party	Votes	%	Seats	+/–
New Democratic Party	32,900	50.33	6	–1
Unity Labour Party	32,419	49.59	9	+1
Green Party	33	0.05	0	0
Independents	16	0.02	0	New
Total	65,368	100.00	15	0
Valid votes	65,368	99.51		
Invalid/blank votes	319	0.49		
Total votes	65,687	100.00		
Registered voters/turnout	98,119	66.95		
Source: Electoral Office
