= Colombia–Saint Vincent and the Grenadines relations =

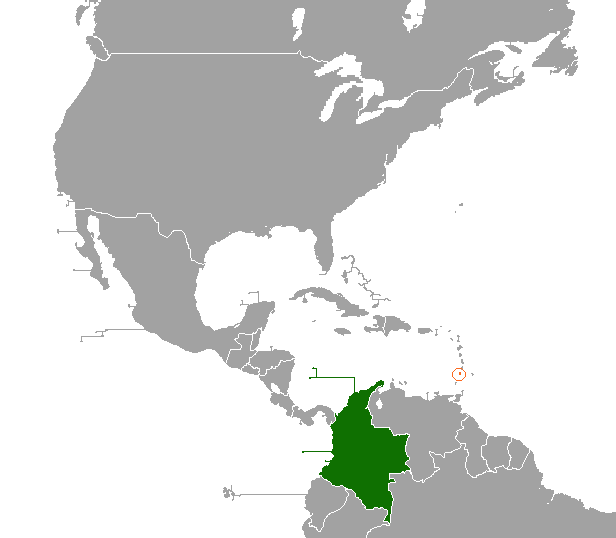
- Colombia: Saint Vincent and the Grenadines

Diplomatic mission
- Embassy of Colombia in Port of Spain: Embassy of Saint Vincent and the Grenadines in Caracas

Colombia–Saint Vincent and the Grenadines relations are the diplomatic relations between the Republic of Colombia and Saint Vincent and the Grenadines. Both governments have maintained a friendly relationship since the late 20th century. The two countries are members of the Organization of American States and the Community of Latin American and Caribbean States.

== History ==
Both governments established diplomatic relations in 1981. On 15 January 2019, Colombian foreign minister Carlos Holmes Trujillo met with the prime minister of Saint Vincent and the Grenadines and in May 2020 a virtual meeting was held between both embassies to discuss humanitarian demining.

On 22 February 2022, Colombia and Saint Vincent and the Grenadines signed the Air Services Agreement. On 29 January 2024, Ambassador of Colombia to Saint Vincent and the Grenadines H.E. William Bush accredited his credentials to the governor general of Saint Vincent and the Grenadines Susan Dougan. A day later on 30 January in the same year, H.E. William Bush held a meeting with Agriculture Minister Saboto Caesar to increase bilateral ties in the agricultural sector.

== Trade ==
In 2022, Colombia exported $1.41M to Saint Vincent and the Grenadines. The products exported from Colombia to Saint Vincent and the Grenadines were made up of Malt ($483k), Raw Sugar ($315k), and Baked Goods ($93.6k). Saint Vincent and the Grenadines exported $590 to Colombia. The products exported from Saint Vincent and the Grenadines to Colombia included Air Pumps ($590).

== Diplomatic representation ==
- Colombia uses its embassy in Port of Spain as a concurrent embassy in Saint Vincent and the Grenadines.
- Saint Vincent and the Grenadines uses its embassy in Caracas as a concurrent embassy in Colombia.

== See also ==
- Foreign relations of Colombia
- Foreign relations of Saint Vincent and the Grenadines
