= Girlyn Miguel =

Vincentian educator and politician (born 1948)

The Honourable Girlyn Miguel CMG MP
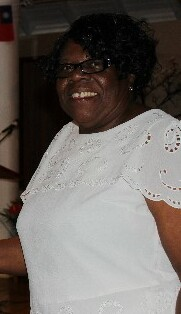

Deputy Prime Minister of Saint Vincent and the Grenadines
- In office 14 December 2010 – 9 December 2015
- Prime Minister: Ralph Gonsalves
- Preceded by: Louis Straker
- Succeeded by: Louis Straker

Member of Parliament for Marriaqua
- In office 15 June 1998 – 9 December 2015
- Preceded by: Bernard Wyllie
- Succeeded by: St. Clair Prince
Ministerial offices
Minister of Education
In office December 2005 – 9 December 2015
Prime Minister	Ralph Gonsalves
Minister of Agriculture
In office February 2003 – December 2005
Prime Minister	Ralph Gonsalves
Minister of Social Development
In office 2001–2003
Prime Minister	Ralph Gonsalves

Personal details
- Born: 1948 (age 77–78) Mesopotamia, Saint Vincent, British Windward Islands
- Party: Unity Labour Party
- Children: 4
- Education: St. Vincent Teachers College

Girlyn Miguel (born 1948) is a Vincentian educator and politician who served in the Parliament of Saint Vincent and the Grenadines from 1998 until 2015. A member of the Unity Labour Party, Miguel also served as deputy prime minister from 2010 to 2015, becoming the first woman to hold the position.

== Early life and career ==
Miguel was born in 1948 in Mesopotamia on the island of Saint Vincent, then a colony within the British Windward Islands. She graduated from the St. Joseph's Convent School in Kingstown in 1967, and began teaching at the government school in Richland Park later that year. In 1970, Miguel received her teaching certificate from the St. Vincent Teachers College, and the following year, she was also granted a Canadian teaching certificate. Miguel would go on to teach at the government schools in Marriaqua and Belmont, as well as becoming the head teacher at the St. Mary's Catholic School, the New Prospect Primary School, and the Argyle Catholic School. Miguel later became the principal of the government schools in Richmond Hill and Sion Hill, as well as at the Kingstown Preparatory School.

== Political career ==
Miguel was elected to the House of Assembly of Saint Vincent and the Grenadines following the 1998 Vincentian general election, representing the Marriaqua constituency as a member of the Unity Labour Party, which was sitting in opposition to the ruling New Democratic Party. Miguel received 2,504 votes, defeating NDP incumbent Bernard Wyllie, who received 1,453 votes. She was re-elected in the 2001 Vincentian general election, receiving 2,858 votes compared to the NDP's 1,435. Following this election, the ULP held a majority in parliament, and Miguel was appointed Minister of Social Development, Cooperatives, The Family, Gender and Ecclesiastical Affairs. Following a cabinet reshuffle in February 2003, Miguel was appointed Minister of Agriculture, Forestry and Fisheries; however, in order to accommodate for Miguel's lack of experience in this field, the Ministry of Agriculture was simplified, with duties like land surveying transferred to other ministries.

Miguel was re-elected in the 2005 Vincentian general election, receiving 2,695 votes compared to the NDP's 1,438. Following her re-election, Miguel was sworn in as Minister of Education. Miguel won re-election in the 2010 Vincentian general election, receiving 2,522 votes, while the NDP received 1,954 votes. In December 2010, Miguel was appointed deputy prime minister, the first woman to hold the position. Miguel opted not to run for re-election in the 2015 Vincentian general election. After leaving office, Miguel served as the chair of the board of directors of the Central Water and Sewerage Authority. In the 2019 New Year Honours, Miguel was appointed a Companion of the Order of St Michael and St George by Queen Elizabeth II, "for services to politics, education, community and to women’s empowerment".

=== Tenure ===
Throughout her political career, Miguel focused primarily on issues related to education. While serving as Minister of Education, she oversaw a major expansion of the education system in Saint Vincent and the Grenadines, and during her tenure the school dropout rate decreased to under 1%. She also supported investments by the government of Taiwan into Saint Vincent and the Grenadines, and frequently met with Taiwanese officials, who financed scholarships for 415 Vincentian students to attend local schools in 2015.

Though Miguel championed for better treatment of women during her tenure as Minister of Social Development, she was heavily criticized following a 2012 parliamentary debate, in which she stated that women should dress modestly in response to an increase in domestic violence, and that the two uses for a woman's breasts are to "suckle the young and to comfort her husband".
