= 2025 Vincentian general election =

- 27 November 2025

15 of the 23 seats in the House of Assembly 8 seats needed for a majority
- Registered: 103,524
- Turnout: 62.53% (▼4.52pp)
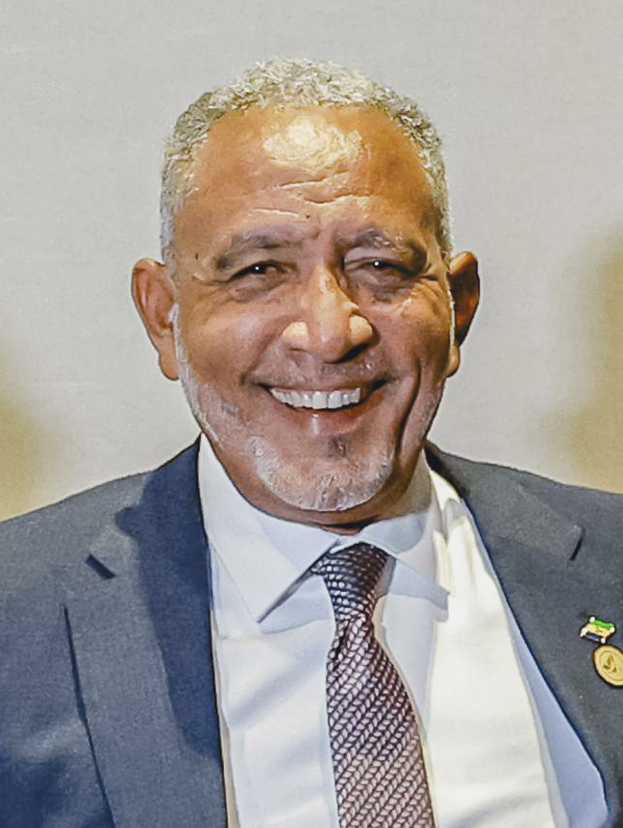

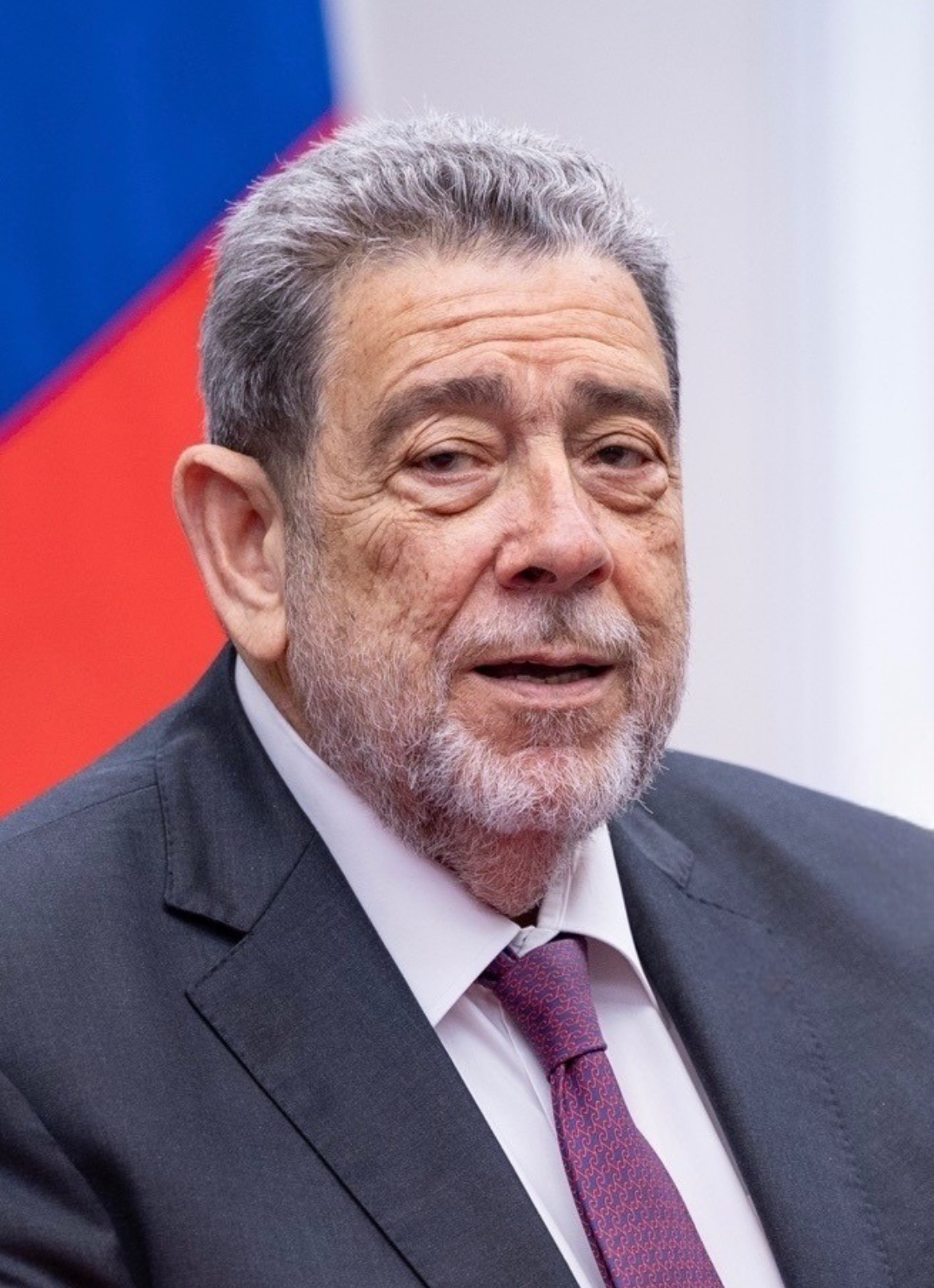
	First party	Second party
Leader	Godwin Friday	Ralph Gonsalves
Party	New Democratic	Unity Labour
Leader since	27 November 2016	6 December 1998
Leader's seat	Northern Grenadines	North Central Windward
Last election	50.33%, 6 seats	49.59%, 9 seats
Seats won	14	1
Seat change	▲8	▼8
Popular vote	37,207	27,152
Percentage	57.74%	42.14%
Swing	▲7.41pp	▼7.19pp
- Results by constituency
Prime Minister before election
Ralph Gonsalves
Unity Labour
Elected Prime Minister
Godwin Friday
New Democratic

General elections were held in Saint Vincent and the Grenadines on 27 November 2025 to elect 15 members of the House of Assembly.

The incumbent Unity Labour Party (ULP) government, led by Prime Minister Ralph Gonsalves, sought re-election to a record sixth term in office. They were challenged by the opposition New Democratic Party (NDP), led by Godwin Friday, who sought to form government for the first time since 1998. The election resulted in a landslide victory for the NDP, winning 14 of the 15 seats up for election. In its worst result in party history, the ULP was reduced to one seat from 9, with Gonsalves as its only remaining representative. The party also saw several cabinet members defeated in what was the largest fall from government in the nation's history. It was also the best result for the NDP since 1989.

== Background ==
The 2020 elections saw the incumbent Unity Labour Party (ULP) government under Ralph Gonsalves getting re-elected to a record fifth consecutive term. While the ULP won nine seats, an increase by one, the incumbent party lost the popular vote for the first time since 1998. Gonsalves was sworn in for his fifth term on 7 November 2020.

The incumbent ULP government sought re-election to a record sixth term in office. They were challenged by the opposition New Democratic Party (NDP), led by Godwin Friday, who sought to form government for the first time since 1998.

== Electoral system ==
The 15 elected members (representatives) of the House of Assembly are elected every five years in single-member constituencies using the first-past-the-post system. A further six members (senators) are appointed; four by the government and two by the opposition. The remaining two seats are held by the attorney general and Speaker, for a total of 23 members.

St. Vincent and the Grenadines has a two-party system. Only the ULP and NDP tend to win seats in elections.

== Parties ==
Party	Position	Ideology	Leader (since)	Slogan and Manifesto
Unity Labour Party (ULP)	Centre-left to left-wing	Democratic socialism Agrarian socialism Republicanism	Ralph Gonsalves (December 1998)	"Lifting SVG higher." "Labour is working fuh We!"
New Democratic Party (NDP)	Centre-right	Conservatism; Pro-Commonwealth	Godwin Friday (November 2016)	"Together We Win" "Yellow is the Code"

== Campaign ==
On 28 October, outgoing Prime Minister Gonsalves dissolved the Parliament, starting the electoral campaign period. The candidate filing deadline was 10 November, and the voter registration deadline was 13 November. Thirty-two candidates filed to contest the 15 seats. Thirty of the candidates were members of either the ULP or NDP, and there was one independent candidate not affiliated with a party. Doris Charles-Frederick, the leader of the National Liberation Movement (NLM), also ran as an independent candidate in South Leeward. Nine of the candidates running were women, and before the election, there were five female members of the House of Assembly.

Early in the campaign, the ULP was expected to lead in the election. In October, the Dunn Pierre Barnett & Company Canada (DPBA) conducted a poll predicting the ULP to lead one seat over the NDP. Women tended to favour the ULP, but men favoured the NDP. Urban voters, especially in Kingstown, recorded lower satisfaction with the government than rural voters. Later, on 12 November, the DPBA still found that the ULP had a 64% chance of retaining power.

The campaign for both parties hinged greatly on economic performance. The relatively high youth unemployment rate, at 27%, was a major driver of dissatisfaction with the ULP-led government. The general unemployment rate of 18% and the poverty rate of 26% also affected the ULP's image.

The ULP contested the election based on the economy, political stability, modernity, regionalism in the Caribbean, and attracting investment in Saint Vincent and the Grenadines. The ULP also supported increasing tourism to the country. Gonsalves and the ULP also supported greater cooperation in the Caribbean. This election was the first in which the ULP did not have a deputy leader. The party focused on the fact that many of their members and candidates are younger than in the NDP. Much sentiment against the ULP was due to their 24-year-long stint in government. The government vaccine mandate during the COVID-19 pandemic also affected the ULP's support. Gonsalves was a strong supporter of the governments of Venezuela under Nicolás Maduro and Cuba under Miguel Diaz-Canel.

The NDP focused on reducing unemployment, improving infrastructure and healthcare, political change, the cost-of-living, and crime. The party's strategy centered around groups least satisfied with the government. The NDP also previously supported severing diplomatic relations with Taiwan and moving to closer ties with the PRC, although this was absent from their election manifesto and the NDP did not commit to such a move during the campaign. The ULP had previously accused the PRC of financing the NDP. The NDP has proposed a "golden passport" system in which foreigners could invest in the country in order to gain citizenship. Surveys show that 62% of Vincentians would support such a citizenship-by-investment program.

The Caribbean Community (CARICOM) sent a ten-member "CARICOM Election Observation Mission" (CEOM) to monitor the election. The CEOM was invited by the outgoing government on 2 October. The mission was in the country from 23–29 November.

== Opinion polling ==
Polling firm	Last date of polling	Source	ULP	NDP	Seats	Chance of victory	Margin of error	Lead
2025 election	27 November 2025		42.3	57.7	1/14	-	-	15.4
Sentinel Research	4 May 2025		34	30	Not surveyed	Not surveyed	±3.1%	4
DPBA	30 October 2025		52	48	8/7	64/33	Not published	4
WIC News	24 November 2025		44	49	3/11	Not surveyed	Not published	5

== Results ==
The opposition NDP obtained a supermajority with 14 out of 15 elected seats, coming back to lead the government for the first time since 2001. This was the largest supermajority government for any party since the 1989 election, and the worst result for the ULP since its foundation in the mid-1990s. The outgoing Prime Minister Ralph Gonsalves was the only ULP representative to retain their seat. Finance Minister Camillo Gonsalves and Agriculture Minister Saboto Caesar, who were both seen as potential leaders of the ULP, would also lose their respective seats. Following the election, the ULP issued a statement saying that it would "keep working and advocating" for Saint Vincent and the Grenadines. Friday was sworn in as Prime Minister on 28 November and his cabinet was sworn in on 2 December.

Party	Votes	%	Seats	+/–
New Democratic Party	37,207	57.74	14	+8
Unity Labour Party	27,152	42.14	1	–8
Independents	80	0.12	0	0
Total	64,439	100.00	15	0
Valid votes	64,439	99.54		
Invalid/blank votes	297	0.46		
Total votes	64,736	100.00		
Registered voters/turnout	103,524	62.53		
Source: Electoral Office (Note: The source shows a discrepancy of 200 votes between the valid votes cast in the North Central Windward constituency and the sum of the votes obtained by each contesting candidates plus the rejected votes.)

=== By constituency ===
Constituency	Electorate	Turnout	%	Political party	Candidate	Votes	%
Central Kingstown	7,677	4,420	57.57	New Democratic Party	St. Clair A. Leacock	2,846	64.6
Central Kingstown	7,677	4,420	57.57	Unity Labour Party	Marvin C. Fraser	1,560	35.4
Central Leeward	7,194	4,781	66.46	New Democratic Party (gain)	Conroy C. Huggins	2,408	50.5
Central Leeward	7,194	4,781	66.46	Unity Labour Party	Orando Brewster	2,359	49.5
East Kingstown	7,418	4,474	60.31	New Democratic Party	Dwight F. Bramble	2,728	61.2
East Kingstown	7,418	4,474	60.31	Unity Labour Party	Luke V. Browne	1,727	38.8
East St. George	9,369	5,778	61.67	New Democratic Party (gain)	Laverne H. Velox	3,395	59.1
East St. George	9,369	5,778	61.67	Unity Labour Party	Camillo M. Gonsalves	2,352	40.9
Marriaqua	7,073	4,387	62.02	New Democratic Party (gain)	Phillip C. Jackson	2,386	54.6
Marriaqua	7,073	4,387	62.02	Unity Labour Party	St. Clair E. Prince	1,983	45.4
North Central Windward	5,891	3,794	64.40	Unity Labour Party	Ralph E. Gonsalves	2,577	68.4
North Central Windward	5,891	3,794	64.40	New Democratic Party	Chieftain J. Neptune	1,193	31.6
North Leeward	6,445	4,512	70.00	New Democratic Party (gain)	Kishore N. M. Shallow	2,526	56.2
North Leeward	6,445	4,512	70.00	Unity Labour Party	Carlos James	1,966	43.8
North Windward	7,303	5,343	73.16	New Democratic Party (gain)	Shevern R. John	2,781	52.2
North Windward	7,303	5,343	73.16	Unity Labour Party	Grace R. Walters	2,542	47.8
Northern Grenadines	4,376	2,535	57.93	New Democratic Party	Godwin L. Friday	2,185	86.6
Northern Grenadines	4,376	2,535	57.93	Unity Labour Party	A. M. Carlos Williams	339	13.4
South Central Windward	6,626	4,303	64.94	New Democratic Party (gain)	Isreal R. Bruce	2,308	53.8
South Central Windward	6,626	4,303	64.94	Unity Labour Party	Saboto S. Caesar	1,984	46.2
South Leeward	8,627	5,260	60.97	New Democratic Party	Nigel Stephenson	3,237	61.8
South Leeward	8,627	5,260	60.97	Unity Labour Party	Grenville Williams	1,971	37.6
South Leeward	8,627	5,260	60.97	Independent	Doris D. Charles	28	0.6
South Windward	7,190	4,375	60.85	New Democratic Party (gain)	Andrew D. John	2,448	56.2
South Windward	7,190	4,375	60.85	Unity Labour Party	Darron R. John	1,911	43.8
Southern Grenadines	3,084	1,790	58.04	New Democratic Party	Terrance Ollivierre	1,172	65.8
Southern Grenadines	3,084	1,790	58.04	Unity Labour Party	Chevonne A. Stewart	609	34.2
West Kingstown	7,226	4,169	57.69	New Democratic Party	Daniel E. Cummings	2,691	65.0
West Kingstown	7,226	4,169	57.69	Unity Labour Party	Keisal M. Peters	1,450	35.0
West St. George	8,025	4,815	60.00	New Democratic Party (gain)	Kaschaka Cupid	2,903	60.7
West St. George	8,025	4,815	60.00	Unity Labour Party	Curtis M. King	1,822	38.2
West St. George	8,025	4,815	60.00	Independent	Kenna V. Questelles	52	1.1
Source: Electoral Office

== Reactions ==
- Jamaica: Prime Minister Andrew Holness congratulated Friday on his victory, describing the election as an "important moment for the Vincentian people" and wishing Friday "every success as he undertakes the responsibility of national leadership".
- Taiwan: The ambassador to St. Vincent and the Grenadines congratulated Friday, despite the NDP previously proposing severing relations with Taiwan and pivoting towards China. However, the opposition Kuomintang was harsher towards the new government, saying that the election reflected "deteriorating cross-strait relations".
- Venezuela: President Maduro said that he would be willing to work with Friday's government and thanked the outgoing Gonsalves. Gonsalves had been a strong supporter of Maduro's government.
