= Central Kingstown =

Central Kingstown (CK) is a House Of Assembly Constituency. It has been represented by St Clair Leacock since 2010

== Elections ==
Party	Candidate	Votes	%
New Democratic Party	St Clair Leacock	2600	55.38
Unity Labour Party	Berisford Phillips	2084	44.39
Green Party	Martha Caruth	11	0.23
