= Ministry of Legal Affairs (Saint Vincent and the Grenadines) =

The Ministry of Legal Affairs of Saint Vincent and the Grenadines oversees the legal system in the government of Saint Vincent and the Grenadines. There were instances in the past in which the Minister of Legal Affairs simultaneously served as the Attorney General or Minister of Information and Justice. Other titles have included Minister of Justice and Minister of Grenadine Affairs and Legal Affairs.

== List of ministers (Post-1979 upon achieving independence) ==
- Arthur Williams (1979-1980)
- Grafton Cephas Isaacs (1980-1983)
- Leonard Riviere (1984)
- Emery Robertson (1984-1986)
- Carl Joseph (1986-1987)
- Parnel Campbell (1987-1995)
- Carlyle Dougan (1996)
- Carl Joseph (1996-2001)
- Judith Jones-Morgan (2001-2017)
- Jaundry Martin (2017-2022)
- Grenville Williams (2022-2025)
- Jaundry Martin (2025)
- Godwin Friday (2025)
- Louise Mitchell (2025-)

== See also ==
- Justice ministry
- Politics of Saint Vincent and the Grenadines
