= Minister of Foreign Affairs (Saint Vincent and the Grenadines) =

This is a list of foreign ministers of Saint Vincent and the Grenadines.

- 1979–1984: Hudson K. Tannis
- 1984–1992: James Fitz-Allen Mitchell
- 1992–1994: Herbert Young
- 1994–1998: Alpian Allen
- 1998–2001: Allan Cruickshank
- 2001–2005: Louis Straker
- 2005: Mike Browne
- 2005–2010: Louis Straker (from 2006, Sir Louis Straker)
- 2010–2013: Douglas Slater
- 2013–2015: Camillo Gonsalves
- 2015–2020: Sir Louis Straker
- 2020–2022: Ralph Gonsalves
- 2022–2024: Keisal Melissa Peters
- 2024–2025: Frederick Stephenson
- From 2025: Fitzgerald Bramble

== Sources ==
- Rulers.org – Foreign ministers S–Z
