= Montgomery Daniel =

Vincentian politician

The Honourable Montgomery Daniel MP
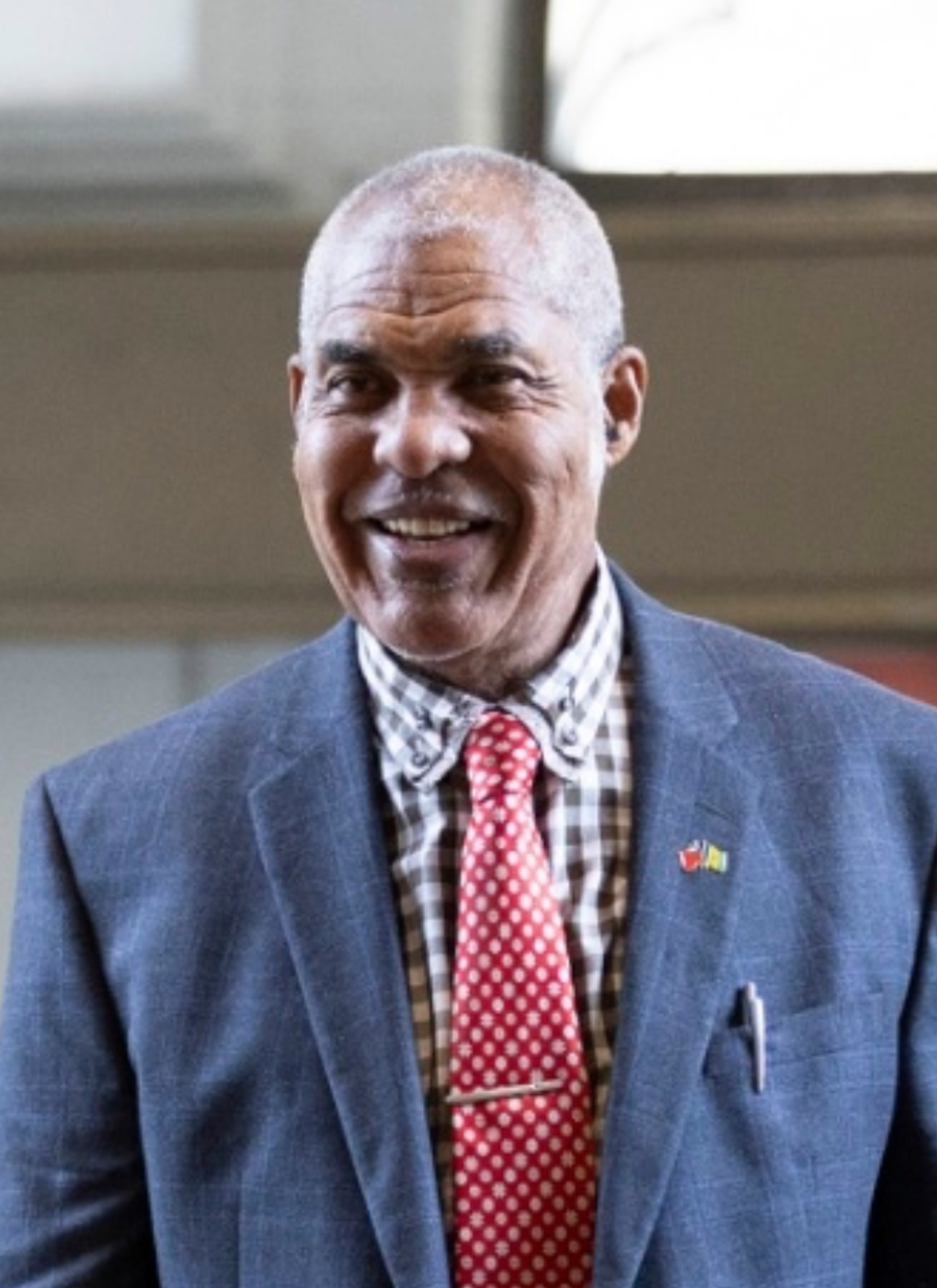
- Daniel in 2024

9th Deputy Prime Minister of Saint Vincent and the Grenadines
- In office 30 November 2020 – 28 November 2025
- Monarchs: Elizabeth II; Charles III
- Governor General: Susan Dougan
- Prime Minister: Ralph Gonsalves
- Preceded by: Louis Straker
- Succeeded by: St. Clair Leacock

Member of House of Assembly of Saint Vincent and the Grenadines
- Incumbent
- Assumed office 28 March 2001
- Constituency: North Windward

Personal details
- Party: Unity Labour Party

Montgomery Daniel (born 1954) is a Vincentian politician. Montgomery is also the Unity Labour Party North Windward candidate for 2020 Vincentian general election. He has been elected as the Member of Parliament for the constituency of North Windward in the House of Assembly of Saint Vincent and the Grenadines since 2001. He was the Deputy Prime Minister from 2020 to 2025.
