= List of ambassadors of Saint Vincent and the Grenadines to the United States =

Coordinates: 38.933154°N 77.085949°W

Ambassador of Saint Vincent and the Grenadines to the United States
- Incumbent; Lou-Anne Gaylene Gilchrist since October 26, 2016
- Inaugural holder: Hudson Kemul Tannis
- Formation: December 8, 1981

The Vincentian ambassador in Washington, D. C. is the official representative of the Government in Kingstown to the Government of the United States.

== List of representatives ==
| Diplomatic agrément | Diplomatic accreditation | Ambassador | Observations | List of prime ministers of Saint Vincent and the Grenadines | List of presidents of the United States | Term end |
|---|---|---|---|---|---|---|
| December 8, 1981 | | | The governments in Washington, D. C. and Kingstown established diplomatic relations when St. Vincent and the Grenadines Ambassador Hudson Kemul Tannis presented his credentials | Milton Cato | Ronald Reagan | |
| December 7, 1981 | December 8, 1981 | Hudson Kemul Tannis | (non-resident) – also Foreign Minister 1979–1984 Minister of Foreign Affairs (Saint Vincent and the Grenadines) (b. 1928 - d. [plane crash] Aug. 3, 1986, between St. Vincent and Bequia islands) | Milton Cato | Ronald Reagan | |
| January 15, 1991 | February 19, 1991 | Kingsley Cuthbert Augustine Layne | C.M.G. | James Fitz-Allen Mitchell | George H. W. Bush | |
| July 25, 2001 | July 31, 2002 | Ellsworth I. A. John | | Ralph Gonsalves | George W. Bush; Barack Obama | |
| May 30, 2008 | June 6, 2008 | La Celia Aritha Prince | Bush stands with Ambassador La Celia Aritha Prince of Saint Vincent and the Grenadines | Ralph Gonsalves | George W. Bush; Barack Obama | |
| July 6, 2016 | October 26, 2016 | Lou-Anne Gaylene Gilchrist | | Ralph Gonsalves | Barack Obama; Donald Trump; Joe Biden; Donald Trump | |
