= Doris Charles-Frederick =

Leader of the National Liberation Movement
- Incumbent
- Assumed office 2022
- Preceded by: Office Established

Personal details
- Party: National Liberation Movement (St Vincent)

Dr Doris Debra Williams Charles-Frederick (née Frederick) is a Vincentian politician and former diplomat who founded the National Liberation Movement in 2022 and has led it since. At their official launch in December 2024, she and her party announced that they were contesting the 2025 Vincentian general election.

Frederick trained in the field of Law, with a LLB (Bachelors of Law), an LLM (Masters of Law) and a PHD (Doctor of Philosophy of Law).

She walked from her home in Questelles to Kingstown in August 2021 calling on the Unity Labour Party administration to resign.

She has been a contributor to the St Vincent Times since 2024.

In January 2025, she was forced to apologise for NLM member Gregory ‘Shaka’ Edwards and disassociate him from the party after he stated “Doris…my natural instinct is to take up a gun and kill all the leaders”. She ran as an independent for MP in the constituency of South Leeward in 2025, coming third with 0.6% of the vote..

== Electoral History ==
South Leeward	8,627	5,260	60.97	New Democratic Party	Nigel Stephenson	3,237	61.8
South Leeward	8,627	5,260	60.97	Unity Labour Party	Grenville Williams	1,971	37.6
South Leeward	8,627	5,260	60.97	Independent	Doris D. Charles	28	0.6
Source: Electoral Office

== Personal ==
She is the wife of former MP for Central Leeward, Maxwell Charles. She is a Christian and outspoken Rastafarian.
