= Rochelle Forde =

Saint Vincentian politician

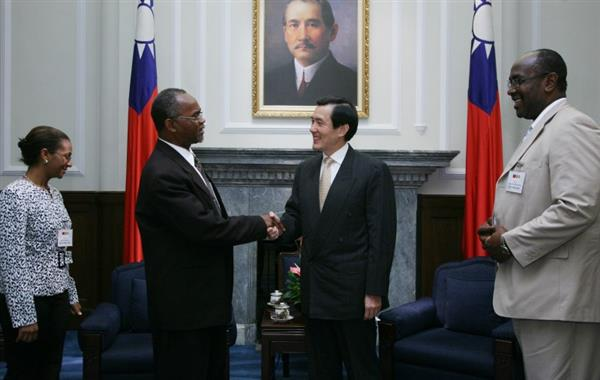
Forde on left

Rochelle Forde (born 1974) is a Saint Vincent and the Grenadines lawyer and politician who was Speaker of the country's House of Assembly from November 2020 to December 2025.

== Career ==
Forde is a barrister and solicitor, completing her study at the Inns of Court School of Law in London. She has been a legal advisor to various companies, as well as Deputy Chief Commissioner of the Girl Guides Association of Saint Vincent and the Grenadines.

Forde was first elected as a Senator for the Unity Labour Party in December 2005 and was elected Deputy Speaker. She served in that role until 29 January 2010.

In 2018, Forde gave a speech at a rally for Grenada's opposition leader Nazim Burke, passing on "warm fraternal greetings" from Ralph Gonsalves, which some interpreted as an endorsement of the party by the ULP. Gonsalves later said, "An endorsement can only come from the political leader of the ULP."

After the 2020 election, Forde was elected Speaker of the House of Assembly on 30 November 2020 after being nominated by Prime Minister Gonsalves. She is the first woman in the role and also has a female Deputy Speaker. Gonsalves had received criticism after appointing an all male Cabinet. Upon her election to the position, Forde said, "[do] not make the mistake of trying to resurrect an old, misguided stereotypical myth which in its folly somehow equated a particular gender with weakness."

After the 2025 Vincentian general election, Forde was succeeded by Ronnia Durham-Balcombe.

== Personal life ==
Forde is a Christian.
