= Saint Vincent and the Grenadines–Turkey relations =

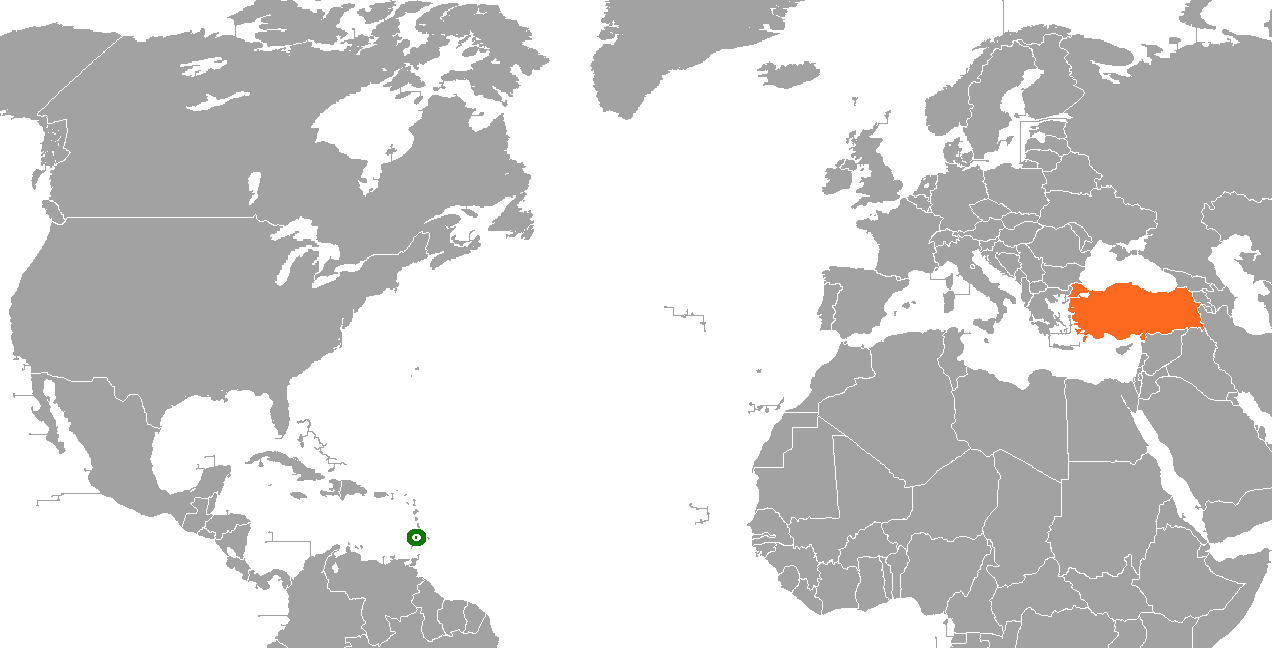
- Saint Vincent and the Grenadines: Turkey

Saint Vincent and the Grenadines–Turkey relations are foreign relations between Saint Vincent and the Grenadines and Turkey.

The Turkish ambassador in Port of Spain is also accredited to St. Vincent and the Grenadines.

== Diplomatic relations ==
Bilateral relations between two countries have been warm and friendly. St. Vincent and the Grenadines’s foreign policy traditionally mirrored that of Britain’s. The two countries ties were especially close after Maurice Bishop’s New Jewel Movement coming to power in 1979, when the public opinion in St. Vincent and the Grenadines supported Prime Minister Cato’s decision to intervene in Grenada.

== High level visits ==
Guest	Host	Place of visit	Date of visit
(Saint Vincent and the Grenadines) Prime Minister Ralph Gonsalves	(Turkey) President Ahmet Necdet Sezer	Çankaya Köşkü, Ankara	March 12–16, 2006
(Turkey) Minister of Foreign Affairs Mevlüt Çavuşoğlu	(Saint Vincent and the Grenadines) Foreign Minister Camillo Gonsalves	Government House, Kingstown	March 11, 2014
(Saint Vincent and the Grenadines) Foreign Minister Camillo Gonsalves	(Turkey) Minister of Foreign Affairs Mevlüt Çavuşoğlu	First Turkey–CARICOM Summit, Istanbul	July 17–21, 2014

== Economic relations ==
- Trade volume between the two countries was US$11.3 million in 2018 (Turkish exports/imports: 4.8/6.5 million USD).

== See also ==
- Foreign relations of Saint Vincent and the Grenadines
- Foreign relations of Turkey
