= Mexico–Saint Vincent and the Grenadines relations =

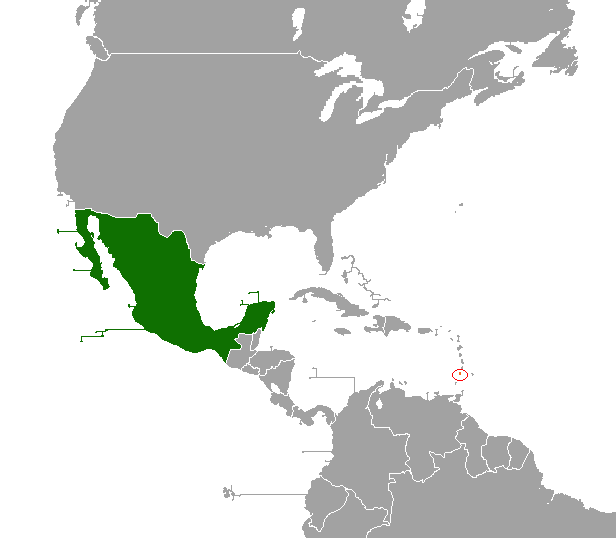

- Mexico: Saint Vincent and the Grenadines

The nations of Mexico and Saint Vincent and the Grenadines established diplomatic relations in 1990. Both nations are members of the Association of Caribbean States, Community of Latin American and Caribbean States, Organization of American States and the United Nations.

== History ==
Mexico and Saint Vincent and the Grenadines established diplomatic relations on 31 July 1990. Since the establishment of diplomatic relations; relations between both nations have taken place primarily in multilateral forums. In March 2002, Vincentian Prime Minister Ralph Gonsalves paid a visit to Mexico to attend the Monterrey Consensus in the Mexican city of Monterrey. In April 2005, Prime Minister Gonsalves paid an official visit to Mexico and met with Mexican President Vicente Fox.

In April 2008, Prime Minister Gonsalves returned to Mexico for an official visit. Along with Mexican Felipe Calderón, both leaders held a brief interview and issued a press release in which they pledged to intensify the relationship in the field of combating drug trafficking and organized crime.

In February 2014, Mexican Foreign Minister José Antonio Meade visited Saint Vincent and the Grenadines to review the damages caused by heavy rains in December 2013. During his visit, Foreign Minister Meade met and interviewed with Prime Minister Ralph Gonsalves and with Foreign Minister Camillo Gonsalves. In April 2014, Mexico granted a donation of US$500,000 that were used for the reconstruction of areas affected by the storms. In May 2014, Vincentian Foreign Minister Camillo Gonsalves traveled to Mexico to attend the Mexico-Caribbean Community summit in Mérida.

In June 2017, Vincentian Foreign Minister Camillo Gonsalves paid a visit to Mexico to attend the 47th General Assembly of the Organization of American States in Cancún. In 2021, Prime Minister Gonsalves and Foreign Minister Keisal Peters traveled to Mexico to attend the Community of Latin American and Caribbean States summit. That same year, the Mexican Government donated two mechanical ventilators in order to aid the fight against COVID-19.

== High-level visits ==
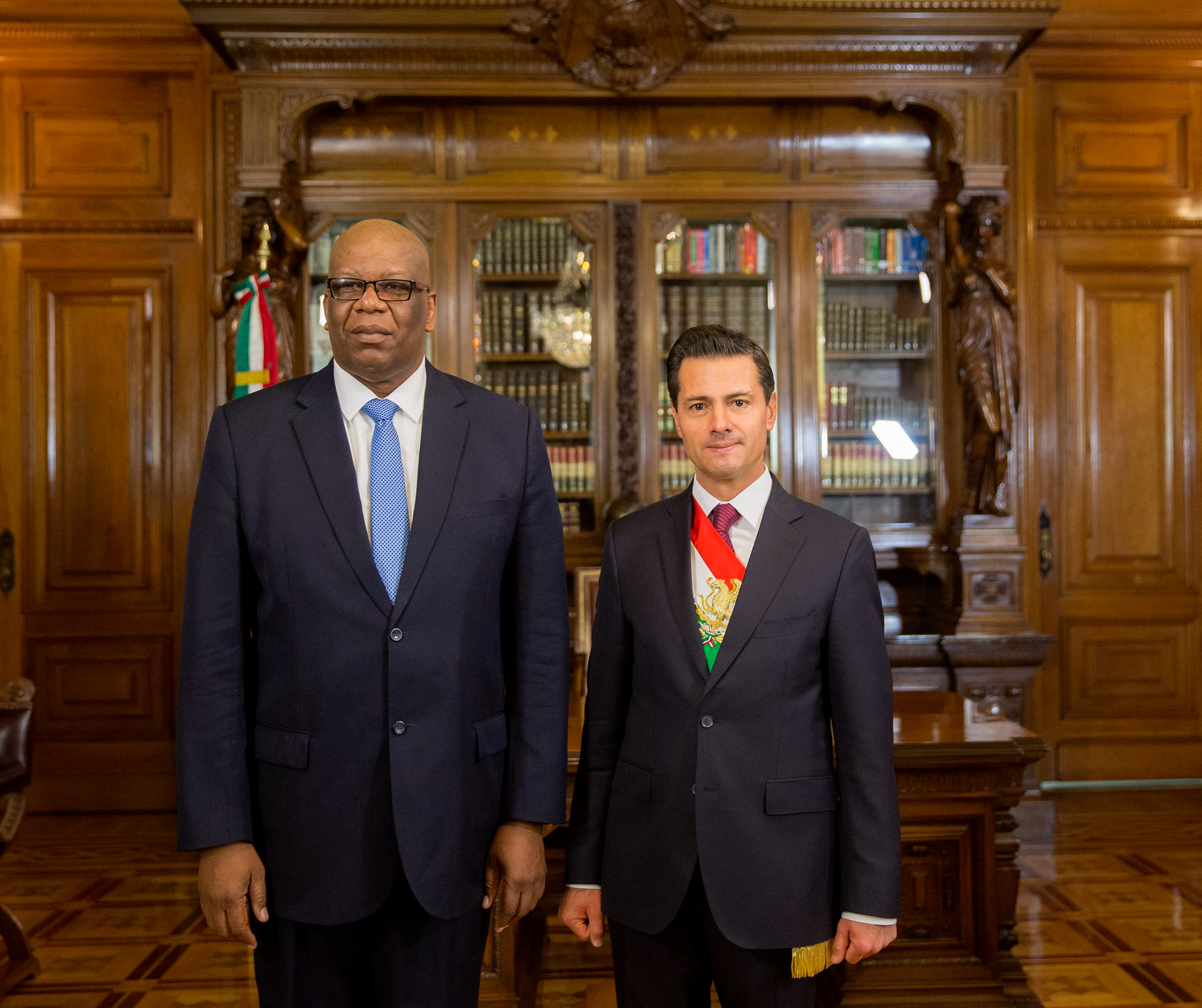
Non-resident Ambassador from Saint Vincent and the Grenadines, Ellsworth John, along with Mexican President Enrique Peña Nieto in Mexico City, April 2017.

High-level visits from Mexico to Saint Vincent and the Grenadines

- Foreign Minister José Antonio Meade (2014)

High-level visits from Saint Vincent and the Grenadines to Mexico

- Prime Minister Ralph Gonsalves (2002, 2005, 2008, 2021)
- Foreign Minister Camillo Gonsalves (2014, 2017)
- Foreign Minister Keisal Peters (July and September 2021)

== Bilateral agreements ==
Both nations have signed an Agreement for Scientific and Technical Cooperation (2007). Each year, the Mexican government offers scholarships for nationals of Saint Vincent and the Grenadines to study postgraduate studies at Mexican higher education institutions.

== Trade ==
In 2023, trade between Mexico and Saint Vincent and the Grenadines totaled US$2.8 million. Mexico's main exports to Saint Vincent and the Grenadines include: construction and parts, monitors and projectors, washing machines, stoves, chemical based products, alcohol and oil. Saint Vincent and the Grenadines's main exports to Mexico include: parts and accessories for motor vehicles, electrical wires and cables, machinery parts, tools and alcohol. Mexican multinational company Cemex operates in Saint Vincent and the Grenadines.

== Diplomatic missions ==
- Mexico is accredited to Saint Vincent and the Grenadines from its embassy in Castries, Saint Lucia and maintains an honorary consulate in Kingstown.
- Saint Vincent and the Grenadines is accredited to Mexico from its embassy in Washington, D.C., United States.
