= United Progressive Party (Saint Vincent and the Grenadines) =

Political party in Saint Vincent and the Greandines

- Leader: Mark JN Doyle
- Chairperson: Donroy Paul
- Deputy Leader: (Vacant)
- Founded: 2 January 2020
- Ideology: Progressivism; Decentralization
- Political position: Centre to centre-left
- Colors: Blue; Purple (former)
- Seats in the House of Assembly: 0 / 15

Election symbol
- Clock

Website
- uppsvg.com

The United Progressive Party (UPP) is a political party in Saint Vincent and the Grenadines. The party was formed on 2 January 2020. Its ideology centers on progressivism and decentralization. They had planned to contest the 2020 Vincentian general election, but suspended their campaign on 3 October. Mark J.N Doyle, the party chair, announced that the UPP would contest in 2025 instead; for 2020, he expressed support for the New Democratic Party over the incumbent Unity Labour Party. Their logo is heavily influenced by that of the Jamaica Labour Party.

== Party color ==
United Progressive Party changed its party color from purple to blue on 15 October 2020. This was announced by the party's president.
