= Speaker of the House of Assembly of Saint Vincent and the Grenadines =

The Speaker of the House of Assembly of Saint Vincent and the Grenadines is elected by the majority party in the House of Assembly in consultation with the Opposition, when the House first meets after a General Election.

== Speakers of the House of Assembly ==
Below is the list of office-holders:

Name	Entered office	Left office
Hon. N. S. Nanton	25 May 1961	14 September 1961
Hon. Emanuel Fatima Adams	11 October 1962	23 May 1966
Hon. Othniel Rudolph Sylvester, CMG, QC	15 September 1966	16 March 1967
Hon. Charles St. Clair Dacon	26 July 1967	1970
Hon. Edward Alexander Clavier Hughes	21 May 1970	20 August 1970
Hon. Joseph Lambert Eustace	4 May 1972	1974
Hon. Arthur T. Woods	2 January 1975	1979
Hon. Edward Alexander Clavier Hughes	27 October 1979	24 July 1981
Hon. Dennie Wilson	17 August 1982	12 April 1984
Hon. Olin J. B. Dennie	23 August 1984	1 August 1985
Hon. L. A. Douglas Williams	21 November 1985	23 March 1989
Hon. Emanuel Fatima Adams	13 June 1989	14 February 1991
Hon. Montgomery Maule	3 June 1991	12 March 1998
Hon. Nolwyn McDowall	9 July 1998	11 January 2001
Hon. Hendrick Alexander	17 April 2001	28 December 2015
Hon. Jomo Sanga Thomas	29 December 2015	26 March 2020
Hon. Carlos James	27 March 2020	29 November 2020
Hon. Rochelle Forde	30 November 2020	23 December 2025
Hon. Ronnia Durham-Balcombe	23 December 2025	Present
