= Foreign relations of Saint Vincent and the Grenadines =

Saint Vincent and the Grenadines maintains close ties to the US, Canada, and the United Kingdom, and cooperates with regional political and economic organizations such as the Organisation of Eastern Caribbean States (OECS) and CARICOM. St. Vincent and the Grenadines is a member of the United Nations, the Commonwealth of Nations, the Organization of American States, and the Association of Caribbean States (ACS). Saint Vincent is also the smallest nation ever to be on the United Nations Security Council.

In May 1997, Prime Minister Mitchell joined 14 other Caribbean leaders and U.S. President Bill Clinton during the first-ever U.S.-regional summit in Bridgetown, Barbados. The summit strengthened the basis for regional cooperation on justice and counternarcotics issues, finance and development, and trade.

Saint Vincent is a transshipment point for South American illicit drugs destined for the US and Europe.

== Diplomatic relations ==
List of countries which Saint Vincent and the Grenadines maintains diplomatic relations with:

| # | Country | Date |
|---|---|---|
| 1 | Barbados | 27 October 1979 |
| 2 | Canada | 27 October 1979 |
| 3 | Guyana | 27 October 1979 |
| 4 | United Kingdom | 27 October 1979 |
| 5 | United States | 27 October 1979 |
| 6 | South Korea | 28 October 1979 |
| 7 | Saint Lucia | 1979 |
| 8 | Switzerland | 1979 |
| 9 | Brazil | 15 April 1980 |
| 10 | Japan | 15 April 1980 |
| 11 | Germany | 12 December 1980 |
| 12 | Belgium | 1980 |
| 13 | Iraq | 1980 |
| 14 | Israel | January 1981 |
| 15 | Colombia | 17 March 1981 |
| 16 | North Korea | 3 April 1981 |
| 17 | Netherlands | 8 April 1981 |
| — | Republic of China | 15 April 1981 |
| 18 | India | 20 April 1981 |
| 19 | Belize | 21 September 1981 |
| 20 | Venezuela | 29 October 1981 |
| 21 | Italy | 30 October 1982 |
| 22 | France | 5 November 1982 |
| 23 | Jamaica | 3 December 1982 |
| 24 | Saint Kitts and Nevis | 19 September 1983 |
| 25 | Argentina | 4 October 1983 |
| 26 | Uruguay | 13 June 1985 |
| 27 | Denmark | 19 September 1985 |
| 28 | Dominican Republic | 26 September 1985 |
| 29 | Australia | 31 January 1986 |
| 30 | Peru | 5 May 1986 |
| 31 | Spain | 12 July 1986 |
| 32 | Thailand | 9 December 1986 |
| 33 | Morocco | 10 August 1988 |
| 34 | Paraguay | 22 June 1989 |
| 35 | Ecuador | 1 August 1989 |
| 36 | Honduras | 2 August 1989 |
| 37 | Chile | 7 September 1989 |
| 38 | Suriname | 10 October 1989 |
| — | Holy See | 17 April 1990 |
| 39 | Mexico | 31 July 1990 |
| 40 | Austria | 29 October 1990 |
| 41 | Nicaragua | 28 June 1991 |
| 42 | Sweden | 2 April 1992 |
| 43 | Guatemala | 4 May 1992 |
| 44 | Cuba | 26 May 1992 |
| 45 | Costa Rica | June 1992 |
| 46 | El Salvador | 8 June 1992 |
| 47 | Marshall Islands | 28 June 1992 |
| 48 | Slovenia | 11 November 1993 |
| 49 | Indonesia | 30 November 1993 |
| 50 | Croatia | 7 October 1994 |
| 51 | Portugal | 12 April 1995 |
| 52 | South Africa | 1 September 1995 |
| 53 | Vietnam | 18 December 1995 |
| 54 | Poland | 16 May 1996 |
| 55 | Czech Republic | 1996 |
| — | Sovereign Military Order of Malta | February 1997 |
| 56 | Greece | 13 August 1997 |
| 57 | Slovakia | 9 December 1998 |
| 58 | Singapore | 19 February 1999 |
| 59 | Philippines | 11 October 2000 |
| — | Sahrawi Arab Democratic Republic (frozen) | 14 February 2002 |
| 60 | Turkey | 4 April 2002 |
| 61 | Belarus | 24 April 2002 |
| 62 | Russia | 17 September 2002 |
| 63 | North Macedonia | 15 May 2003 |
| 64 | Romania | 22 May 2003 |
| 65 | Azerbaijan | 23 May 2003 |
| 66 | Maldives | 27 May 2003 |
| 67 | Bulgaria | 11 September 2003 |
| 68 | Ethiopia | 16 February 2004 |
| 69 | Iceland | 24 May 2004 |
| 70 | Uganda | 27 July 2004 |
| 71 | Malta | 10 December 2004 |
| 72 | Armenia | 17 December 2004 |
| 73 | Hungary | 23 May 2005 |
| 74 | Libya | 2 December 2005 |
| 75 | Panama | 17 July 2006 |
| 76 | Cyprus | 2 August 2006 |
| 77 | Latvia | 25 August 2006 |
| 78 | Estonia | 13 October 2006 |
| 79 | Lithuania | 5 February 2007 |
| 80 | Algeria | 7 February 2007 |
| 81 | Burkina Faso | 20 February 2007 |
| 82 | Botswana | 22 February 2007 |
| 83 | Liberia | 2 May 2007 |
| 84 | Niger | 31 May 2007 |
| 85 | Mali | 11 June 2007 |
| 86 | Cape Verde | 13 June 2007 |
| 87 | Mauritius | 18 June 2007 |
| 88 | Tunisia | 2 July 2007 |
| 89 | Finland | 11 September 2007 |
| 90 | Luxembourg | 26 September 2007 |
| 91 | Iran | 13 July 2008 |
| 92 | Ghana | 1 August 2008 |
| 93 | Djibouti | 7 August 2008 |
| 94 | Senegal | 23 September 2008 |
| 95 | Comoros | 3 October 2008 |
| 96 | Malaysia | 11 November 2008 |
| 97 | Monaco | 12 February 2009 |
| 98 | United Arab Emirates | 20 February 2009 |
| 99 | Bosnia and Herzegovina | 19 March 2009 |
| 100 | Gambia | 2 May 2009 |
| 101 | Cambodia | 12 January 2010 |
| 102 | Andorra | 30 May 2010 |
| 103 | Georgia | 22 June 2010 |
| 104 | Montenegro | 8 November 2010 |
| 105 | Egypt | 16 November 2010 |
| 106 | Moldova | 29 April 2011 |
| 107 | Solomon Islands | 4 May 2011 |
| 108 | Serbia | 26 May 2011 |
| 109 | Mongolia | 13 October 2011 |
| 110 | Tuvalu | 19 September 2012 |
| 111 | Bahrain | 28 September 2012 |
| 112 | Kazakhstan | 21 November 2012 |
| 113 | Kuwait | 8 January 2013 |
| 114 | Fiji | 15 April 2013 |
| 115 | Sri Lanka | 15 April 2013 |
| 116 | Ireland | 10 December 2013 |
| 117 | New Zealand | 14 August 2014 |
| 118 | Brunei | 27 May 2015 |
| — | State of Palestine | 26 September 2016 |
| 119 | Qatar | 21 March 2017 |
| 120 | Seychelles | 26 May 2017 |
| 121 | Nepal | 27 September 2017 |
| 122 | Tajikistan | 18 December 2017 |
| 123 | Oman | 1 April 2019 |
| 124 | San Marino | 24 September 2019 |
| 125 | Bolivia | 25 September 2019 |
| 126 | Ukraine | 25 September 2019 |
| 127 | Kyrgyzstan | 26 September 2019 |
| 128 | Namibia | 5 December 2019 |
| 129 | Kenya | 12 August 2020 |
| 130 | Rwanda | 9 November 2021 |
| 131 | Burundi | 24 November 2021 |
| 132 | Ivory Coast | 28 January 2022 |
| 133 | Angola | 30 March 2022 |
| 134 | Uzbekistan | 10 May 2022 |
| 135 | Sierra Leone | 12 April 2023 |
| 136 | Benin | 3 October 2023 |
| 137 | Saudi Arabia | 11 October 2023 |
| 138 | Palau | 21 May 2024 |
| 139 | Pakistan | 3 June 2024 |
| 140 | Zambia | 24 September 2024 |
| 141 | Togo | 21 September 2026 |
| 142 | Antigua and Barbuda | Unknown |
| 143 | Bahamas | Unknown |
| 144 | Dominica | Unknown |
| 145 | Grenada | Unknown |
| 146 | Haiti | Unknown |
| 147 | Liechtenstein | Unknown |
| 148 | Trinidad and Tobago | Unknown |

== Bilateral relations ==
| Country | Formal Relations Began | Notes |
|---|---|---|
| Australia | | Australia is represented in Saint Vincent and the Grenadines by its High Commission in Trinidad and Tobago.; Both countries are full members of the Commonwealth of Nations. |
| Republic of China (Taiwan) | 1981 | Both countries established diplomatic relations in 1981. Saint Vincent and the Grenadines maintains an embassy in Taipei while Taiwan is represented by its embassy in Kingstown. |
| Denmark | | Denmark is represented in Saint Vincent and the Grenadines by its embassy in Mexico City. |
| Finland | 1976-01-30 | Finland is represented in Saint Vincent and the Grenadines through a roving ambassador.; Finland has an honorary consulate in Kingstown.; Saint Vincent and the Grenadines is represented in Finland through its embassy in London. |
| Iceland | 2004 | Both countries established diplomatic relations on May 27, 2004.; Iceland is represented in Saint-Vincent-and-the-Grenadines by its Mission to the United Nations in New York City, United States. |
| Ireland | 2013 | Ireland is represented in Saint Vincent and the Grenadines through its embassy in Washington DC, United States. |
| India | | See India–Saint Vincent and the Grenadines relations |
| Mexico | July 31, 1990 | See Mexico–Saint Vincent and the Grenadines relations: Saint Vincent and the Grenadines does not have an embassy accredited to Mexico.; Mexico is accredited to Saint Vincent and the Grenadines from its embassy in Castries, Saint Lucia and maintains an honorary consulate in Kingstown. |
| New Zealand | | New Zealand is represented in Saint Vincent and the Grenadines by its embassy in Bridgetown, Barbados.; Both countries are full members of the Commonwealth of Nations. |
| Turkey | July 27, 2004 | See Saint Vincent and the Grenadines–Turkey relations: Turkish Embassy in Port of Spain is accredited to St. Vincent and Grenadines.; Trade volume between the two countries was US$11.3 million in 2019 (St. Vincent's exports/imports: 6.5/4.8 million USD). |
| United Kingdom | 27 October 1979 | See Saint Vincent and the Grenadines–United Kingdom relations Saint Vincent and the Grenadines established diplomatic relations with the United Kingdom in 27 October 1979. Both countries are Commonwealth Realms.: Saint Vincent and the Grenadines maintains a high commission in London.; The United Kingdom is accredited to its high commission in Kingstown.; The UK governed Saint Vincent and the Grenadines as part of the Windward Islands colony from 1833 to 1979, when Saint Vincent and the Grenadines achieved full independence. Both countries share common membership of the Caribbean Development Bank, the Commonwealth, the International Criminal Court, the World Trade Organization, and the CARIFORUM–UK Economic Partnership Agreement. |
| United States | | See Saint Vincent and the Grenadines–United States relations |

== See also ==
- List of diplomatic missions in Saint Vincent and the Grenadines
- List of diplomatic missions of Saint Vincent and the Grenadines
