= Saboto Caesar =

Vincentian politician and lawyer

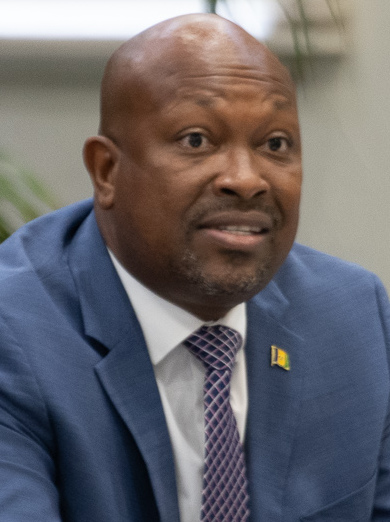
- Caesar in 2022

Politician
- Monarch: Elizabeth II
- Governor General: Susan Dougan

Party Member of Saint Vincent and the Grenadines Green Party Unity Labour Party

Personal details
- Born: Saint Vincent and the Grenadines
- Political party: Unity Labour Party

Saboto Caesar is a Vincentian politician and lawyer. Saboto is also an elected member of the cabinet and minister of agriculture for St Vincent and the Grenadines Saboto is also the Unity Labour Party South Central Windward candidate for 2020 Vincentian general election.

== Early life and education ==
Saboto Scofield Caesar born 21 December 1980 was grown up in Diamonds Village, St Vincent and the Grenadines. He attended the St Martin Secondary School and St Vincent Community College then further high studies at the University of London where he studied law.

== Political career ==
In St Vincent and the Grenadines 2010 election Saboto faced the elections for the first time and was elected to the cabinet for winning with 57.0% of the votes in his constituency.

In St Vincent and the Grenadines 2015 election Saboto was once again elected as cabinet member after winning with 56.69% of votes.
