= Education in Saint Vincent and the Grenadines =

Education in Saint Vincent and the Grenadines is neither compulsory nor free, although children are usually in school until the age of 15. In 1998, the gross primary enrollment rate was 90.5 percent, and the net primary enrollment rate was 83.5 percent.

Primary school attendance rates were unavailable for St. Vincent and the Grenadines as of 2001. While enrollment rates indicate a level of commitment to education, they do not always reflect children's participation in school. According to the government, cases in which children leave school before the age of 16 are investigated.

The Human Rights Measurement Initiative (HRMI) finds that St. Vincent and the Grenadines is fulfilling only 88.4% of what it should be fulfilling for the right to education based on the country's level of income. HRMI breaks down the right to education by looking at the rights to both primary education and secondary education. While taking into consideration St. Vincent and the Grenadines' income level, the nation is achieving 84.8% of what should be possible based on its resources (income) for primary education and 91.9% for secondary education.

== See also ==
- Ministry of Education and National Reconciliation
- Thomas Saunders Secondary School
- List of universities in Saint Vincent and the Grenadines
