= Politics of Saint Vincent and the Grenadines =

Politics of Saint Vincent and the Grenadines takes place in the framework of a parliamentary democracy. Saint Vincent and the Grenadines is an independent Commonwealth realm, with Charles III as its king, represented by a governor-general, who acts on the advice of the prime minister and the cabinet. The prime minister is the leader of the majority party of the House of Assembly, and the cabinet conducts affairs of state. The governor-general exercises ceremonial functions, but reserve powers, under the Saint Vincent and the Grenadines constitution, can be used at the governor-general's discretion.

The House of Assembly is a unicameral parliament with fifteen elected members and six appointed senators. The governor general appoints senators, four on the advice of the prime minister and two on the advice of the leader of the opposition. The parliamentary term of office is five years, although the prime minister may call elections at any time.

As in other English-speaking Caribbean countries, the judiciary in St. Vincent is rooted in English common law. There are eleven courts in three magisterial districts. The Eastern Caribbean Supreme Court, comprising a high court and a court of appeals, is known in St. Vincent as the St. Vincent and the Grenadines supreme court. The court of last resort is the Judicial Committee of the Privy Council in London.

There is no local government in St. Vincent, and all six parishes are administered by the central government.

== Political conditions ==
The People's Political Party (PPP), founded in 1952 by Ebenezer Joshua, was the first major political party in St. Vincent. The PPP had its roots in the labor movement and was in the forefront of national policy prior to independence, winning elections from 1957 through 1966. With the development of a more conservative Black middle class, however, the party began to steadily lose support, until it collapsed after a rout in the 1979 elections. The party dissolved itself in 1984.

Founded in 1955, the Saint Vincent Labour Party (SVLP), under Milton Cato, gained the support of the middle class. With a conservative law-and-order message and a pro-Western foreign policy, the SVLP dominated politics from the mid-1960s until the mid-1980s. Following victories in the 1967 and 1974 elections, the SVLP led the island to independence, winning the first post-independence election in 1979. Expecting an easy victory for the SVLP in 1984, Cato called early elections. The results were surprising: with a record 89% voter turnout, James Fitz-Allen Mitchell's New Democratic Party (NDP) won nine seats in the house of assembly.

Until 2001 election, politics in St. Vincent was dominated by the NDP. Bolstered by a resurgent economy in the mid-1980s, Mitchell led his party to an unprecedented sweep of all fifteen House of Assembly seats in the 1989 elections. The opposition emerged from the election weakened and fragmented, but was able to win three seats during the February 1994 elections under a "unity" coalition. In 1998, Prime Minister Mitchell and the NDP were returned to power for an unprecedented fourth term but only with a slim margin of eight seats to seven seats for the Unity Labour Party (ULP). The NDP was able to accomplish a return to power while receiving a lesser share of the popular vote, approximately 45% to the ULP's 55%. In March 2001, the ULP, led by Ralph Gonsalves, assumed power after winning twelve of the fifteen seats in Parliament. The party returned to power under the same leadership in December 2005, holding the same twelve seats in Parliament. The ULP was returned to power in 2010, and also following the election on 9 December 2015, when it won 8 out of the 15 constituencies. In the 2020 elections, the Gonsalves' administration retained government for the 5th consecutive time. In the 2025 Vincentian general election, the NDP under its leader Godwin Friday, swept to power, winning 14 of 15 seats and forming government.

== Executive branch ==
As head of state, King Charles III is represented by a governor general who acts on the advice of the prime minister and the cabinet.

Main office-holders

The King of Saint Vincent and the Grenadines:
Charles III
since
8 September 2022

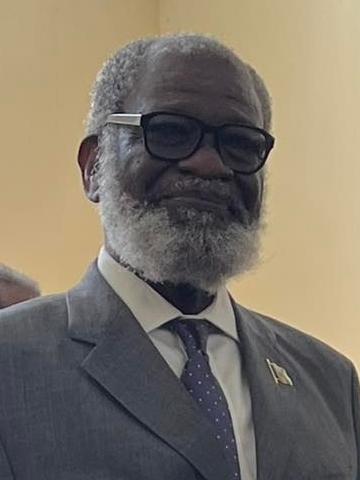
The Governor-General of Saint Vincent and the Grenadines:
Stanley John
since
6 January 2026

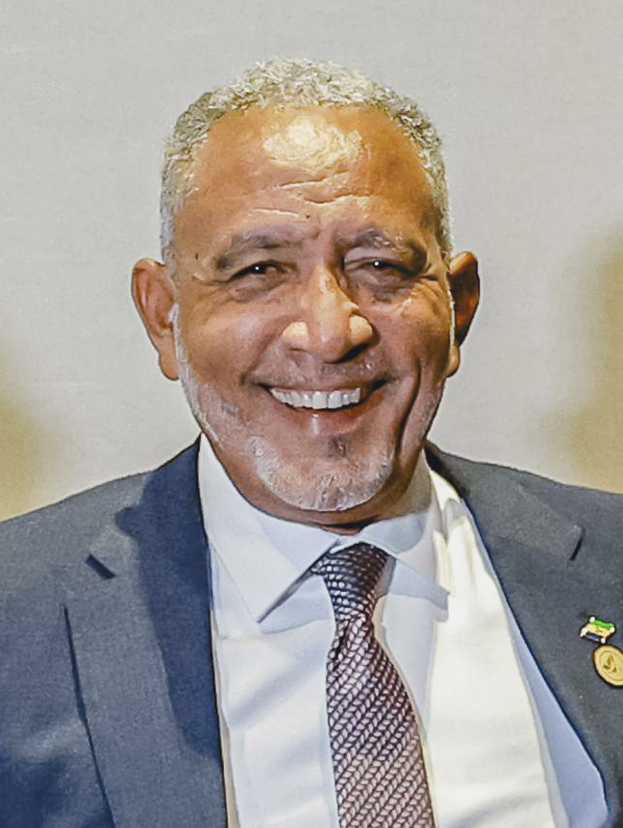
The Prime Minister of Saint Vincent and the Grenadines:
Godwin Friday
since
28 November 2025

== Legislative branch ==
The House of Assembly has 21 members, 15 members elected for a five-year term in single seat constituencies and 6 appointed senators.

== Judicial branch ==
Eastern Caribbean Supreme Court (based in Saint Lucia), one judge of the Supreme Court resides in Saint Vincent.

== Administrative divisions ==
The country is divided into six parishes: Charlotte, Saint George, Saint Andrew, Saint Patrick, Saint David and The Grenadines.

== International organization participation ==
ACP, ALBA, C, Caricom, CDB, CELAC, ECLAC, FAO, G-77, IBRD, ICAO, ICC, ICFTU, ICRM, IDA, IFAD, IFRCS, ILO, IMF, IMO, Intelsat (nonsignatory user), Interpol, IOC, ITU, OAS, OECS, OPANAL, OPCW, UN, UNCTAD, UNESCO, UNIDO, UPU, WCL, WFTU, WHO, WIPO, WTrO
