= St. Clair Leacock =

Vincentian politician

The Honourable St. Clair Leacock MP
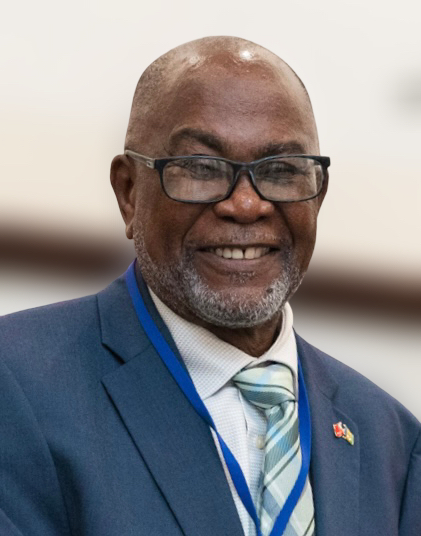
- Leacock in 2026

10th Deputy Prime Minister of Saint Vincent and the Grenadines
- Incumbent
- Assumed office 3 December 2025
- Monarch: Charles III
- Governors General: Susan Dougan; Stanley John
- Prime Minister: Godwin Friday
- Preceded by: Montgomery Daniel

Member of Parliament
- Incumbent
- Assumed office December 2010
- Preceded by: Conrad Sayers
- Constituency: Central Kingstown

Personal details
- Party: New Democratic Party
- Website: http://ndpsvg.org

Major St. Clair Leacock is a Vincentian politician who has served as the Deputy Prime Minister of Saint Vincent and the Grenadines and Minister of National Security and Immigration since December 2025. He is a member of the parliament in Saint Vincent and the Grenadines from New Democratic Party. Leacock is also the New Democratic Party Central Kingstown candidate for 2020 Vincentian general election.

In 2000, Leacock was President of the Employers' Federation in St. Vincent and the Grenadines

== Political career ==
In 2010, Leacock joined the New Democratic Party. In the 13 December 2010 general election Leacock contested and ran for Central Kingstown and was elected to the House of Assembly as member of the opposition in Saint Vincent and the Grenadines after winning 54.09% of the vote. His party was unable to get in government but he was able to win his seat in Parliament.

In the 2015 election, Leacock was once again elected to the House of Assembly after winning his seat for Central Kingstown. He and his party colleagues claim that the election was stolen, and his party is currently in the process of a court case willing to get in government.

After the 2025 elections, he was appointed as the Deputy Prime Minister and minister of national security and immigration on 3 December 2025.
