= Ronnia Durham-Balcombe =

Speaker of the House of Assembly of Saint Vincent and the Grenadines

Speaker of the House of Assembly of Saint Vincent and the Grenadines
- Incumbent
- Assumed office 23 December 2025
- Preceded by: Rochelle Forde

Personal details
- Party: New Democratic Party

Ronnia Durham-Balcombe is a politician who has been the Speaker of the House of Assembly of Saint Vincent and the Grenadines since 2025.

== Personal life ==
In 2018, Durham-Balcombe accused one of her male colleagues of assault during a brawl in a rum shop that initially involved the suspect, who was also a lawyer, and Durham-Balcombe's husband. She was elected president of the NDP Women's Arm in 2022.

Her husband Cameron "Dinky" Balcombe was the New Democratic Party candidate for North Central Windward in the 2010 Vincentian general election until he was dropped as a candidate leading up to the election after he and his father, businessman Alison Balcombe, were charged with possession of ammunition without a license; Cameron was later found not guilty on the charges.

== See also ==
- List of female speakers of national and territorial unicameral parliaments
