= Ivan O'Neal =

Vincentian politician (died 2024)

Leader of the Saint Vincent and the Grenadines Green Party
- In office 10 January 2005 – 27 May 2024

Personal details
- Born: Ivan Bertie O'Neal Spring Village, Saint Patrick Parish, Saint Vincent and the Grenadines
- Died: 27 May 2024 Saint George Parish, Saint Vincent and the Grenadines
- Party: Saint Vincent and the Grenadines Green Party
- Education: Oxford Brookes University; University of Bradford; University of Leicester
- Website: http://www.svggreenparty.org

Ivan Bertie O'Neal (died 27 May 2024) was a Vincentian politician and leader of the Saint Vincent and the Grenadines Green Party (SVG Green Party). O'Neal was also the Saint Vincent and the Grenadines Green Party East St. George candidate for 2020 Vincentian general election.

O'Neal served as the treasurer of the Unity Labour Party before breaking ranks with the party in 2000 to join the now-defunct People's Progressive Movement (PPM). He contested the North Central Winward constituency as a PPM candidate during the 28 March 2001 general election and received 30 votes.

== Education ==
Born in Spring Village, O'Neal earned a BSc in accounting and finance from Oxford Brookes University, an MSc in Macro Economics, Policy and Planning from the University of Bradford, and an MBA from the University of Leicester.

== Career ==
In the 2005 general elections, he contested the East Saint George constituency seat representing the SVG Green Party and was defeated, winning only 14 votes. In the 2010 general elections O'Neal ran in Central Kingstown, where he won 12 votes.

== Death ==
O'Neal died near Choppins, Saint George Parish, Saint Vincent and the Grenadines on 27 May 2024, after an illness.
