= Saint Vincent and the Grenadines–United States relations =

Saint Vincent and the Grenadines– United States relations

- Saint Vincent and the Grenadines: United States

Saint Vincent and the Grenadines–United States relations are bilateral relations between Saint Vincent and the Grenadines and the United States.

The United States and St. Vincent have solid bilateral relations. Both governments are concerned with eradicating local marijuana cultivation and combating the illegal drug trade. In 1995, the United States and St. Vincent signed a maritime law enforcement agreement. In 1996, the Government of St. Vincent and the Grenadines signed an extradition treaty with the United States. In 1997, the two countries signed a mutual legal assistance treaty.

The United States supports the Government of St. Vincent and the Grenadines' efforts to expand its economic base and to provide a higher standard of living for its citizens. U.S. assistance is channeled primarily through multilateral agencies such as the World Bank. The United States has 10 Peace Corps volunteers in St. Vincent and the Grenadines, working in primary literacy education. The U.S. military also provides assistance through construction and humanitarian civic action projects.

A relatively small number of Americans—fewer than 800—reside on the islands.

== Embassies ==
The United States maintains no official presence in St. Vincent, with the exception of the Peace Corps office. The Ambassador and Embassy officers are resident in Barbados and frequently travel to St. Vincent.

== See also ==
- North American Union
- North American Free Trade Agreement
- Free Trade Area of the Americas
- Third Border Initiative
- Caribbean Community
- Caribbean Basin Initiative (CBI)
- Caribbean Basin Trade Partnership Act
- Western Hemisphere Travel Initiative
- Foreign relations of Saint Vincent and the Grenadines
- Foreign relations of the United States
