= Terrance Ollivierre =

The Honourable Terrance Nathaniel Ollivierre MP

Member of Parliament for the Southern Grenadines
- Incumbent
- Assumed office 2005
- Monarchs: Elizabeth II; Charles III
- Prime Minister: Ralph Gonsalves

Personal details
- Born: September 16, 1964 (age 61)
- Party: New Democratic Party

Terrance Nathaniel Ollivierre is a Vincentian politician, teacher and vocalist. Terrance is also the Minister of Higher Education, Grenadine Affairs, Local Government, and Airports and Seaports.

Terrance is the Member of Parliament for the constituency of Southern Grenadines in the House of Assembly of Saint Vincent and the Grenadines.

== Political career ==
In the 2001 general election Terrance competed for the first time for elections and was elected to House of Assembly of Saint Vincent and the Grenadines.

On 7 December 2005 general elections, Terrance competed and was elected to House of Assembly of Saint Vincent and the Grenadines as opposition (MP) with a voter amount of 1,857

In 2010, Terrance was elected for a third term, but his party New Democratic Party was defeated by the Unity Labour Party

In 2015, his party leader Arnhim Eustace argued with current Prime Minister Ralph Gonsalves about elections being unfair.

He was re-elected in 2020 and 2025, after the latter of which he was made a minister in the new NDP government.
