= The SVG Party =

- Leader: Derek Richards-Jones
- Founded: August 2018
- Seats in the House of Assembly: 0 / 15

Website
- https://thesvgparty.com/

The SVG Party (TSVGP) is a political party in Saint Vincent and the Grenadines. The SVG Party was founded in August 2018 by Derek Richards-Jones. The party aims to pull the country together and put the sole interest of the country first regardless of political persuasions.
