= Carlos James (politician) =

Speaker of the House of Assembly of Saint Vincent and the Grenadines
- In office 26 March 2020 – 8 October 2020
- Preceded by: Jomo Sanga Thomas
- Succeeded by: Rochelle Forde

Personal details
- Born: 1983 (age 42–43)
- Party: Unity Labour Party

Carlos James is a politician from Saint Vincent and the Grenadines. He is a former Speaker of the House and Minister of Tourism.

James was born in 1983. He worked as a journalist before he got law degrees from University of Huddersfield and City Law School, London.

James was appointed to the House of Assembly in 2015 from Unity Labour Party, and was elected deputy speaker on 29 December 2015 until March 2019. He was elected Speaker of the House of Assembly from 26 March 2020 to 8 October 2020. He was elected to the House of Assembly in the 2020 elections from North Leeward constituency. He joined the cabinet of Saint Vincent on 12 November 2020 as Minister of Tourism, Civil Aviation, Sustainable Development and Culture.

After the defeat in the 2025 elections, James has been one of the appointed opposition members of the House of Assembly.
