= La Celia Aritha Prince =

St Vincentian diplomat (born 1977)

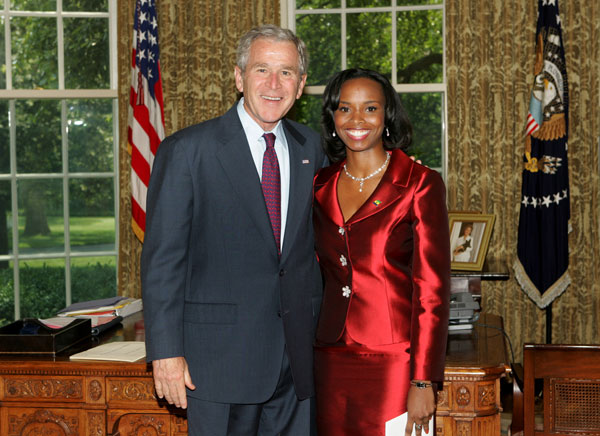
President George W. Bush with Ambassador Prince in the Oval Office on June 6, 2008.

La Celia Aritha Prince (born in Kingstown, St. Vincent and the Grenadines, 1977) became Ambassador of St. Vincent and the Grenadines to the United States on May 30, 2008. Prince was the youngest ambassador in the Washington diplomatic corps.

== Education ==
Prince earned an LLB from the University of the West Indies in 1999 and her Legal Education Certificate from the Hugh Wooding Law School, qualifying as a lawyer in 2001.

== Career ==
At first, she practiced as a barrister-at-law and solicitor in St. Vincent and the Grenadines prior to earning a master’s studies in law at Cambridge University. In 2003, Prince took up a fellowship in multilateral trade negotiations and was assigned to the CARICOM delegation at the Secretariat of the Free Trade Area of the Americas in Puebla, Mexico for a short time at the World Trade Organization in Geneva, Switzerland.

She first served in Washington beginning in September 2005, as minister counselor at the Embassy of St. Vincent and the Grenadines and alternate representative to the Organization of American States. She succeeded Fitzgerald Bramble as deputy chief of mission.

Prince stepped down as ambassador in July 2016 and joined the OAS. Lou-Anne Gaylene Gilchrist was appointed as her replacement.
