= Benarva Browne =

Vincentian politician

Personal details
- Born: 26 September 1989 (age 36) Saint Vincent and the Grenadines
- Education: University of the West of England; Massachusetts Institute of Technology

Benarva Browne is a Vincentian politician. On July 12, 2023, she was sworn in as Senator and Minister of Urban Development, Energy, Seaports Administration & Development, Grenadines Affairs and Local Government in Saint Vincent and the Grenadines. Senator Browne is by profession a Town and Country Planner.

== Education ==
Browne holds a master's degree in Town and Country Planning (MPLAN) from the University of the West of England (UWE), Bristol, located in the United Kingdom (UK). In 2020, she was selected for the 2020-2021 Hubert H. Humphrey Fellowship Program, and subsequently pursued a fellowship in Urban and Regional Planning at the Massachusetts Institute of Technology.

== Professional life ==
Outside of politics, Browne has been a Town and Country Planning Expert in the Caribbean. She has been involved in policy development and programme planning and implementing environmental and sustainable development initiatives and private sector projects in the OECS. Browne has also served as Junior Consultant for UN-Habitat (United Nations Human Settlements Programme).
