= Godwin Friday =

Prime Minister of Saint Vincent and the Grenadines since 2025

The Honourable Godwin Friday MP
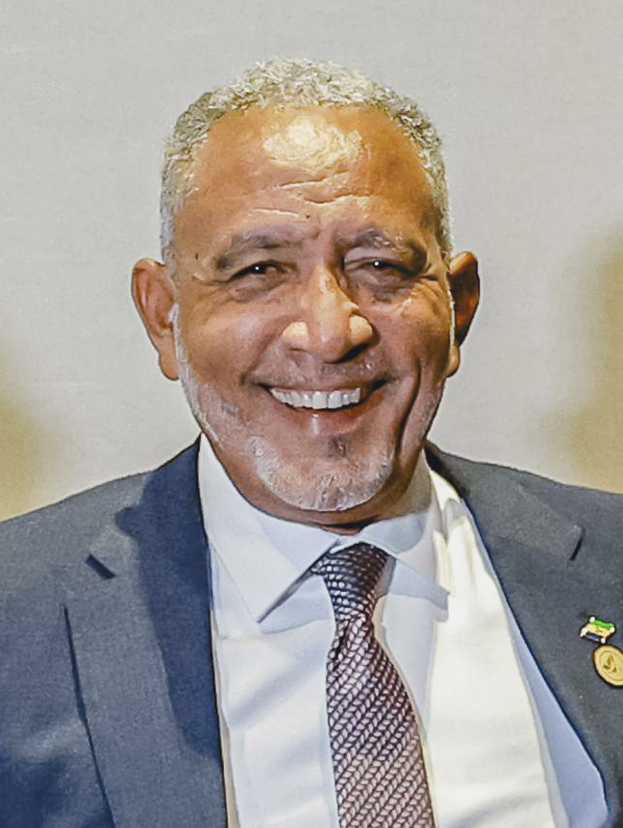
- Friday in 2026

5th Prime Minister of Saint Vincent and the Grenadines
- Incumbent
- Assumed office 28 November 2025
- Monarch: Charles III
- Governors-General: Susan Dougan; Stanley John
- Deputy: St. Clair Leacock
- Preceded by: Ralph Gonsalves

Leader of the New Democratic Party
- Incumbent
- Assumed office 27 November 2016
- Preceded by: Arnhim Eustace

Leader of the Opposition
- In office 21 November 2016 – 28 November 2025
- Monarchs: Elizabeth II; Charles III
- Governors-General: Frederick Ballantyne; Susan Dougan
- Preceded by: Arnhim Eustace
- Succeeded by: Ralph Gonsalves

Member of Parliament
- Incumbent
- Assumed office 28 March 2001
- Constituency: Northern Grenadines

Personal details
- Born: 28 September 1959 (age 67) Bequia, West Indies Federation (present day Saint Vincent and the Grenadines)
- Party: New Democratic Party
- Education: University of Waterloo (BA, MA); Queen's University (LLB, PhD)
- Website: http://ndpsvg.com

Godwin Elliot Loraine Friday (born 28 September 1959) is a Vincentian politician who has served as Prime Minister of Saint Vincent and the Grenadines since 2025 and as leader of the New Democratic Party (NDP) since 2016. He has been the Member of Parliament (MP) for the Northern Grenadines constituency since 2001 and served as the leader of the opposition from 2016 to 2025.

In the 2001 general election, Friday was elected to the House of Assembly for the first time. He retained his seat in the 2005, 2010, 2015, 2020, and 2025 elections. In the 2025 general election, Friday's NDP defeated Ralph Gonsalves' long-governing Unity Labour Party, forming a supermajority government and becoming prime minister.

== Early life and education ==
He was born on 28 September 1959 in Bequia, the second-largest island in Saint Vincent and the Grenadines and the largest island of the Grenadines. Friday earned a Bachelor of Arts in history and political science from the University of Waterloo, and a Bachelor of Laws from Queen's University in Ontario, Canada. He graduated with a master's degree in history from the University of Waterloo in 1985. In 1989, he graduated with a doctorate in political studies from Queen's University.

== Political career ==
In 2016, Arnhim Eustace, the party leader and opposition leader of Saint Vincent and the Grenadines, resigned, which left Friday with the position as party leader and leader of the opposition. He led the party into the 2020 general election, winning the popular vote but losing 1 seat. At the 2025 general election, the NDP won 14 of 15 seats in the House of Assembly, forming government for the first time since 1998. Friday took additional portfolios of Minister of Finance and Minister of Justice.

== Publications ==
- Islands in the Stream: The development of a machinery for the conduct of external affairs in the Bahamas and Bahamian foreign policy, 1973–1985 (MA Thesis, 1985)
- The Caribbean Basin Initiative and industrial development in Trinidad and Tobago (1989)
- A Political Economy of 'State Capitalism' in Trinidad and Tobago: social struggles and the development process (PhD Thesis, 1989)

Party political offices
Preceded by Arnhim Eustace	Leader of the New Democratic Party; 2016–present	Incumbent
Political offices
Preceded by Ralph Gonsalves	Prime Minister of Saint Vincent and the Grenadines; 2025–present	Incumbent
