= Ministry of Education and National Reconciliation =

Saint Vincent and the Grenadines education ministry

The Ministry of Education and National Reconciliation is the education ministry of Saint Vincent and the Grenadines, a country in the Caribbean.

The head office of the ministry is in the government ministerial complex in Kingstown.

As of 2021, Curtis King was the minister of education. The title had also been "Minister of Education, National Reconciliation, Ecclesiastical Affairs, and Information".

Vincentian schools give Christian religious education which does not follow a particular denomination.

== See also ==
- Education in Saint Vincent and the Grenadines
- List of education ministries
