= Lou-Anne Gaylene Gilchrist =

St. Vincent and the Grenadines diplomat

Lou-Anne Gaylene Gilchrist, H.E. is the Permanent Representative to the Organization of American States and Ambassador to the United States from Saint Vincent and the Grenadines. She was appointed on October 26, 2016. She is also the non resident ambassador to Canada, She succeeded La Celia Aritha Prince. She was chair of the Permanent Council of the OAS until September 30, 2021.

== Biography ==
She attended the University of the West Indies at Cave Hill, earning a BA in Modern Languages. From 1997 until 2009, she was a lecturer at Saint Vincent and the Grenadines, teaching Modern Languages. In 2004, she earned an MA in the subject from the University of Warwick.

Gilchrist became an education officer in 2009 at the Ministry of Education.
