= Saint Vincent and the Grenadines Green Party =

- Founded: 10 January 2005
- Ideology: Environmentalism; Green politics Eco-socialism; Scientific socialism
- Political position: Left-wing
- Seats: 0 / 15

Website
- www.svggreenparty.org

The Saint Vincent and the Grenadines Green Party is a green political party in Saint Vincent and the Grenadines. The party was led by Ivan O'Neal from 2005 until his death in 2024, and has never gained representation in the House of Assembly.

The party was formed on 10 January 2005. In the elections that year the party fielded four candidates in the 15 constituencies, but received just 34 votes and failed to win a seat. In the 2010 elections the party received 138 votes, but remained seatless.

== Electoral history ==
=== House of Assembly elections ===
Election	Party leader	Votes	%	Seats	+/–	Position	Result
2005	Ivan O'Neal	34	0.06%	0 / 15	Steady	▲3rd	Extra-parliamentary
2010	Ivan O'Neal	138	0.22%	0 / 15	Steady	3rd	Extra-parliamentary
2015	Ivan O'Neal	77	0.12%	0 / 15	Steady	3rd	Extra-parliamentary
2020	Ivan O'Neal	35	0.05%	0 / 15	Steady	3rd	Extra-parliamentary
