= Thomas Saunders Secondary School =

Location
- Richmond Hill, Kingstown, St. Vincent and the Grenadines; Saint Vincent and the Grenadines
- Coordinates: 13°09′14″N 61°13′26″W

Information
- Type: Public Secondary School
- Motto: Striving for excellence
- Established: 2005
- Language: English

Thomas Saunders Secondary School is a high school located at Richmond Hill, Kingstown, St. Vincent and the Grenadines. The building was formerly the Richmond Hill Primary School. The school was named after a former principal of the Richmond Hill Primary School, Thomas Saunders. Their motto is "Striving for excellence". The School was established in 2005 and held their first graduation in 2010.

Like all Vincentian schools the students wear uniforms. The Thomas Saunders Secondary School students wear white shirts, black pants for boys and black skirts for girls, and a red and black striped tie.
