= Louis Straker =

Saint Vincent and the Grenadines politician

Sir Louis Straker KCMG
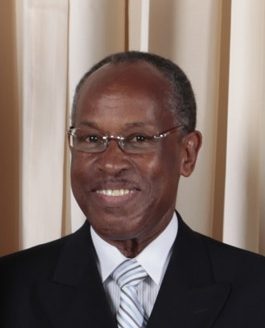

Deputy Prime Minister of Saint Vincent and the Grenadines
- In office 10 December 2015 – 7 November 2020
- Monarch: Elizabeth II
- Governors General: Frederick Ballantyne; Susan Dougan
- Prime Minister: Ralph Gonsalves
- Preceded by: Girlyn Miguel
- Succeeded by: Montgomery Daniel

Vice President of the Unity Labour Party
- Incumbent
- Assumed office 2001

Personal details
- Born: Louis Hilton Straker; 23 February 1944 (age 82) Layou, Saint Vincent, British Windward Islands (Now Saint Vincent and the Grenadines)
- Party: Unity Labour Party
- Education: Hunter College, New York.

Sir Louis Hilton Straker, KCMG (born 23 February 1944) is a politician who served as Deputy Prime Minister of Saint Vincent and the Grenadines from 2015 to 2020. He was the Minister of Foreign Affairs, Commerce and Trade from 2001 to May 17, 2005 when he was transferred to the Ministry of Transport, Works and Housing during a cabinet reshuffle. He became Foreign Minister again in December 2005.

== Early life and education ==
Straker was born on 23 February 1944 in Layou. He was raised in Saint Vincent and the Grenadines by his father Bertram Augustus Straker.

He was educated at the Layou Government school, then to the Emmanuel High school and later gained higher education at the Hunter College, New York.

== Political career ==
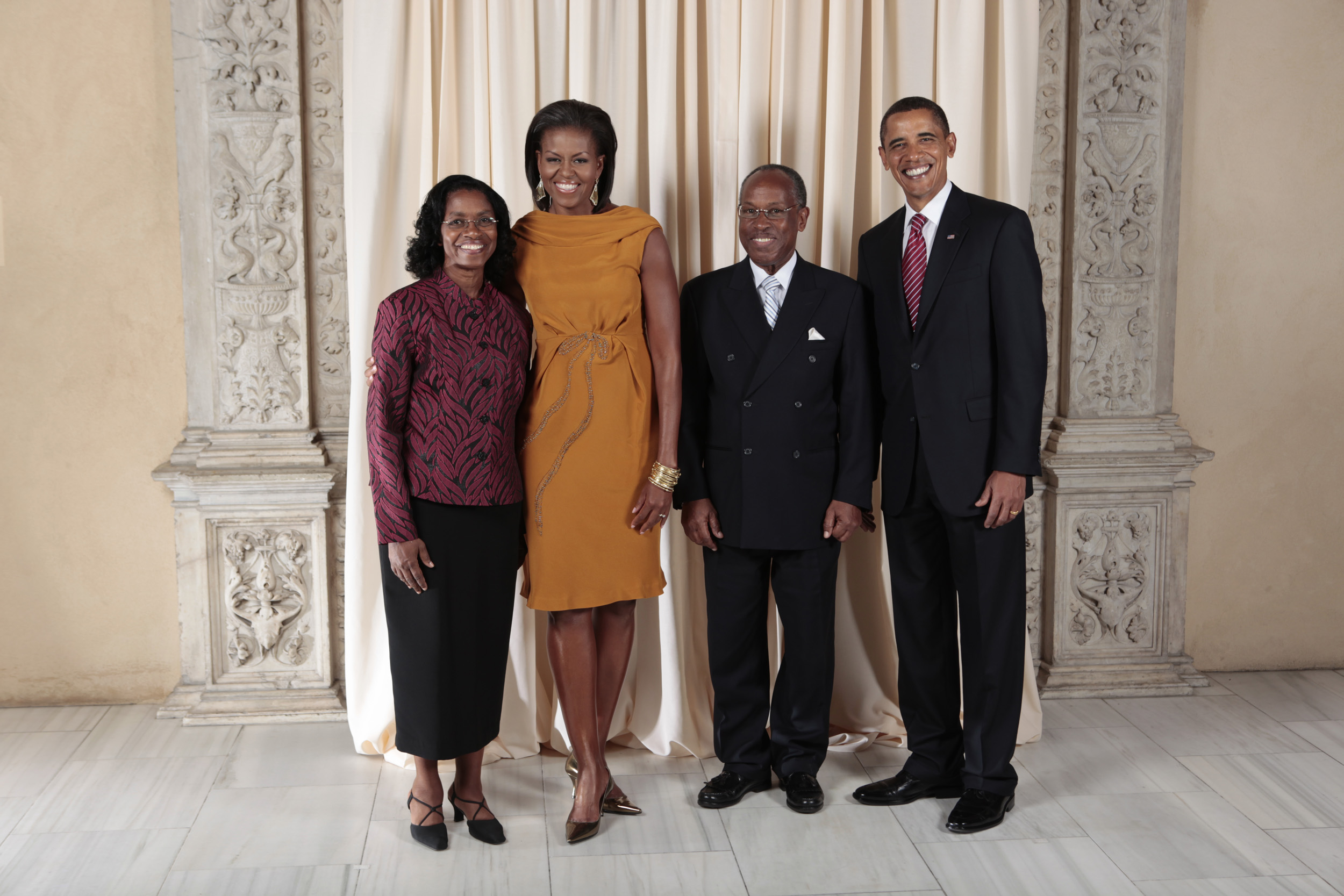
Louis Straker with Obamas

In the 2001 general election his party gained 69.2% of the vote. The Unity Labour Party gain government and Louis Straker was elected to house of parliament.

In the 2015 general election his party gained 52.28% of the vote with a total of 34,246 of the votes. Louis was once again elected to house of parliament for Central Leeward.

== Personal life ==
Straker is a member of the Seventh-day Adventist Church.

== Honours ==
Straker was made a Knight Commander of the Order of St Michael and St George in May 6, 2006.

== See also ==
- List of foreign ministers in 2017
