= Douglas Slater =

Saint Vincent and the Grenadines politician

Douglas Slater is a Saint Vincent and the Grenadines politician.

== Biography ==
He was Minister of Foreign Affairs, Foreign Trade and Consumer Affairs from 2010 to 2013. He served as Assistant Secretary-general of the Caribbean Community (CARICOM). He served as minister of health.
