= Camillo Gonsalves =

Vincentian politician (born 1972)

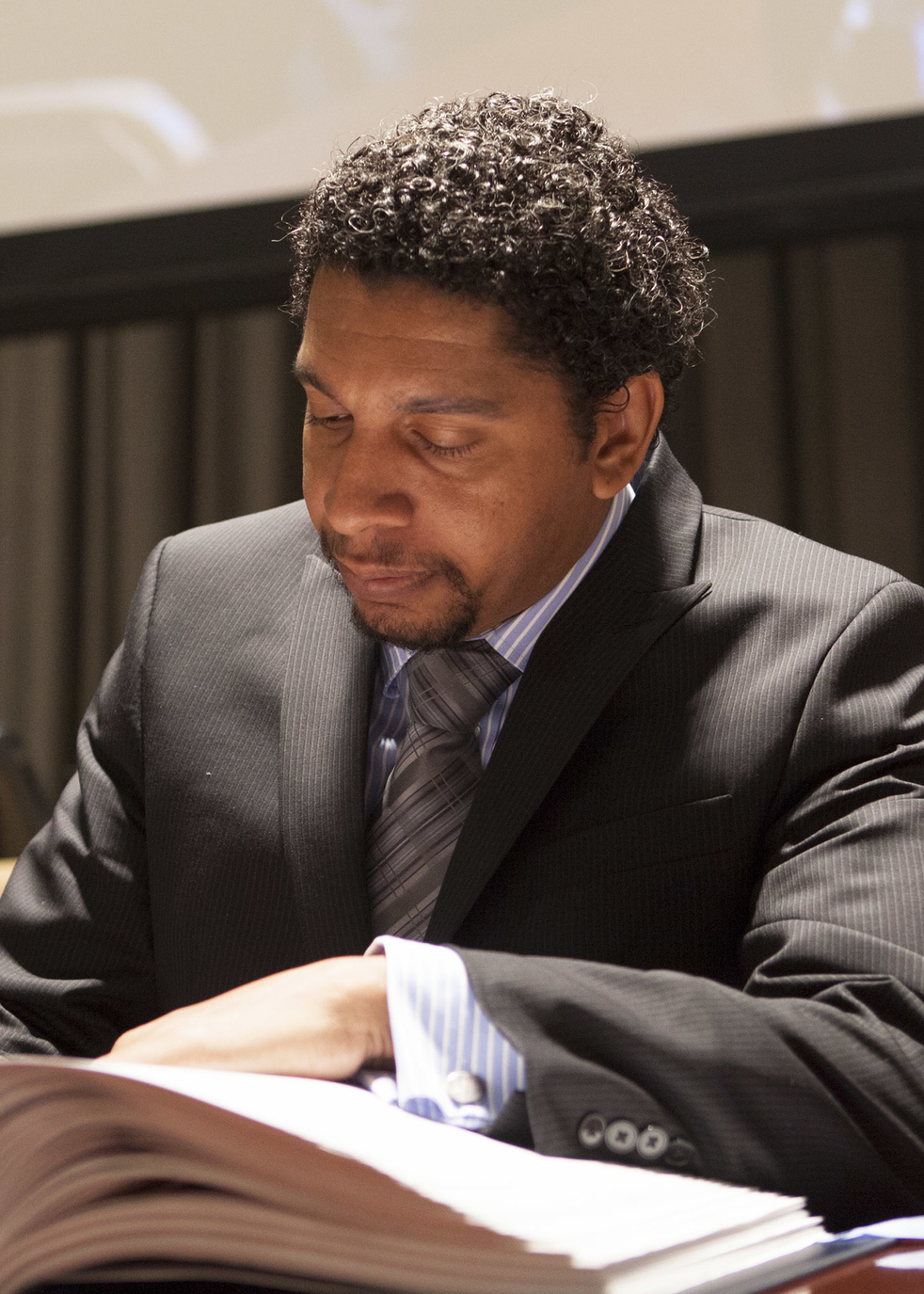

Minister of Finance
- In office 10 November 2017 – 28 November 2025
- Prime Minister: Ralph Gonsalves
- Preceded by: Ralph Gonsalves
- Succeeded by: Godwin Friday

Permanent Representative to the United Nations for Saint Vincent and the Grenadines
- In office November 2007 – September 2013
- Preceded by: Margaret Hughes-Ferrari

Personal details
- Born: 12 June 1972 (age 54) Philadelphia, Pennsylvania, United States
- Party: Unity Labour Party
- Education: Temple University; George Washington University; New York University

Camillo Michael Gonsalves (born 12 June 1972) is a Vincentian politician, lawyer and diplomat and a son of former long-term Prime Minister Ralph Gonsalves. He served as Minister of Finance, Economic Planning and Information Technology of Saint Vincent and the Grenadines during the premiership of his father and additionally sat in the House of Assembly as the representative for the constituency of East St. George from 2015 to 2025.

== Early life and education ==
Gonsalves was born on 12 June 1972 in Philadelphia to Ralph Gonsalves and his then-wife Sonia V. Gonsalves, Professor of Psychology at Stockton University.

Gonsalves obtained a Bachelor of Arts degree in journalism from Temple University in Philadelphia, and then a Juris Doctor from George Washington University Law School in Washington DC. He also has a Master of Science degree in Global Affairs from New York University.

== Career ==
Gonsalves worked as a journalist in Philadelphia before graduating from law school, and then worked as a corporate litigation attorney in Washington, DC. He subsequently worked as a Senior Crown Counsel for the government of Saint Vincent and the Grenadines, before being appointed to diplomatic postings "in various capacities in Cuba, Venezuela, Ethiopia, South Korea, Libya and throughout the CARICOM region".

In November 2007, Gonsalves became St. Vincent and the Grenadines' Permanent Representative to the United Nations, replacing Ambassador Margaret Hughes-Ferrari.

In September 2013, Gonsalves was appointed as a senator in the House of Assembly of St. Vincent and the Grenadines, and renounced his U.S. citizenship prior to taking up the position. He was appointed Minister of Foreign Affairs, Foreign Trade, Consumer Affairs and Information Technology.

In the December 2015 elections, Gonsalves was elected to the House of Assembly after successfully contesting the seat for the constituency of East St. George. On 14 December 2015, he was sworn in as Minister of Economic Planning, Sustainable Development, Industry, Trade, Information and Labour.

In a surprise cabinet reshuffle which took effect on 10 November 2017, Gonsalves took on the responsibility of the finance ministry, a portfolio his father had held since his Unity Labour Party administration came to government in 2001, becoming Minister of Finance, Economic Planning and Sustainable Development.

Gonsalves was re-elected for a second consecutive term in the 5 November 2020 elections and was sworn in as Minister of Finance, Economic Planning and Information Technology on 10 November 2020.

Gonsalves lost his seat in the 27 November 2025 elections.
