= Judith Jones-Morgan =

Saint Vincent and the Grenadines politician

Attorney General of Saint Vincent and the Grenadines
- In office 2001–2017
- Succeeded by: Jaundy Martin

Personal details
- Born: Judith Stephanie Jones
- Occupation: Lawyer
- Known for: Longest-serving Attorney General of Saint Vincent and the Grenadines

Judith Jones-Morgan is a Vincentian lawyer who served as Attorney General of Saint Vincent and the Grenadines from 2001 to 2017, making her the longest-serving Attorney General in the country’s history. She is a member of the Seventh-day Adventist Church.

== Career ==
Jones-Morgan worked in public service prior to her appointment as Attorney General and was not a member of the political executive at the time of her selection. She was appointed Attorney General in 2001 following the election of the Unity Labour Party government.

During her tenure, she was responsible for overseeing the drafting and passage of legislation, including statutory instruments and legislative acts considered by Parliament. She served for approximately 16 years, making her the longest-serving Attorney General in Saint Vincent and the Grenadines and the only woman to hold the position at the time.

=== Departure from office ===
Jones-Morgan demitted office in 2017 and was succeeded by Jaundy Martin. Her departure was marked by recognition in Parliament.

== Recognition ==
In 2012, Jones-Morgan was appointed a Companion of the Order of St Michael and St George (CMG) in recognition of her contribution to the administration of justice and the development of law in Saint Vincent and the Grenadines.
