= Deputy Prime Minister of Saint Vincent and the Grenadines =

- Coat of arms of Saint Vincent and the Grenadines

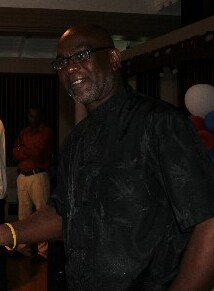
- Incumbent; St. Clair Leacock since 3 December 2025
- Style: The Right Honourable
- Formation: 1972

Deputy Prime Minister of Saint Vincent and the Grenadines is a senior cabinet-level position in Saint Vincent and the Grenadines. The deputy prime minister is appointed by the prime minister. The position of deputy prime minister is not formally provided in the constitution, but the holder of the position usually is the first choice for acting prime minister.

== Deputy Premiers 1972-1974 ==
Name	Took office	Left office	Notes
Ebenezer Joshua	4 May 1972	9 May 1974	

== Deputy prime ministers ==
Incumbent (Birth–Death)	Portrait	Tenure		Political affiliation	Notes
Incumbent (Birth–Death)	Portrait	Took office	Left office	Political affiliation	Notes
Hudson K. Tannis (1928–1986)		October 1980	July 1984	Saint Vincent Labour Party	
Edward Griffith		July 1984	1986	New Democratic Party	
David Emmanuel Jack (1918–1998)		1986	?	New Democratic Party	
Allan C. Cruickshank		July 1989	February 1994	New Democratic Party	
Parnel Campbell		February 1994	September 1995	New Democratic Party	
Louis Straker (1944–)		17 April 2001	9 November 2010	Unity Labour Party	
Girlyn Miguel (1948–)		29 December 2010	19 October 2015	Unity Labour Party	
Louis Straker (1944–)		29 December 2015	30 November 2020	Unity Labour Party	
Montgomery Daniel (1954–)		30 November 2020	3 December 2025	Unity Labour Party	
St. Clair Leacock		3 December 2025	Incumbent	New Democratic Party	

== See also ==
- Governor-General of Saint Vincent and the Grenadines
