= Keisal Peters =

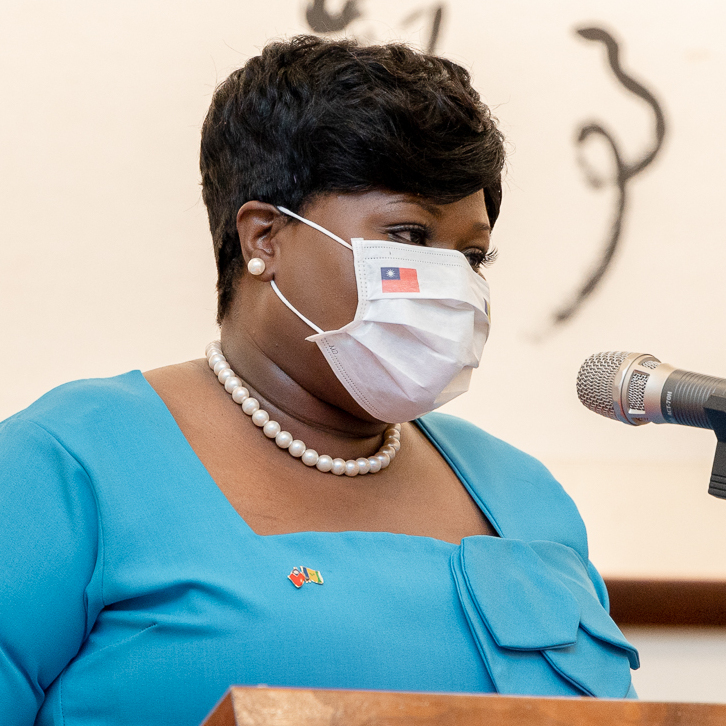
- in Taiwan in 2023
- Other name: Keisal Melissa Peters
- Occupations: lawyer, Minister

Keisal Melissa Peters is a lawyer and politician in St Vincent and the Grenadines. She became the first woman to be her country's Foreign Minister in 2022.

== Early life and education ==
Peters' early education was at Lowmans Leeward Anglican School and then St. Vincent Girls’ High School. She was interested in student politics, the girl guides and the Red Cross. She then attended St. Vincent and the Grenadines Community College.

She studied law at the University of the West Indies and completed her legal qualification in Trinidad and Tobago at the Hugh Wooding Law School.

== Career ==
Peters was elected to the national assembly in 2020. In August 2022 she became the first woman to serve as the Minister of Foreign Affairs and Foreign Trade. She succeeded the Prime Minister Ralph Gonsalves who held that portfolio but he delegated that responsibility to Peters so that he could concentrate on improving the country's tertiary education system.

On 16 July 2024 the Prime Minister announced a reshuffle of ministers. He was speaking after Hurrican Beryl had struck. He said he wanted Peters to look at "the heart and soul of the government". Peters remained in the cabinet and she became the Minister for National Mobilisation, Social Development, Family, Gender Affairs and Persons with Disabilities. In February 2025 she was with ambassador Fiona Huei-Chun Fan when they accepted $66,000 of aid donated by American Taiwanese businesswoman Tina Bow following Hurricane Beryl.

In November 2025, Peters was the Unity Labour Party's (ULP) candidate for West Kingstown. However, she was defeated by Daniel E. Cummings of the New Democratic Party.
