= 2010 Vincentian general election =

General election held in Saint Vincent and the Grenadines

- 13 December 2010

15 of 23 seats in the House of Assembly 8 seats needed for a majority
- Registered: 101,067
- Turnout: 62.33% (▼1.34pp)
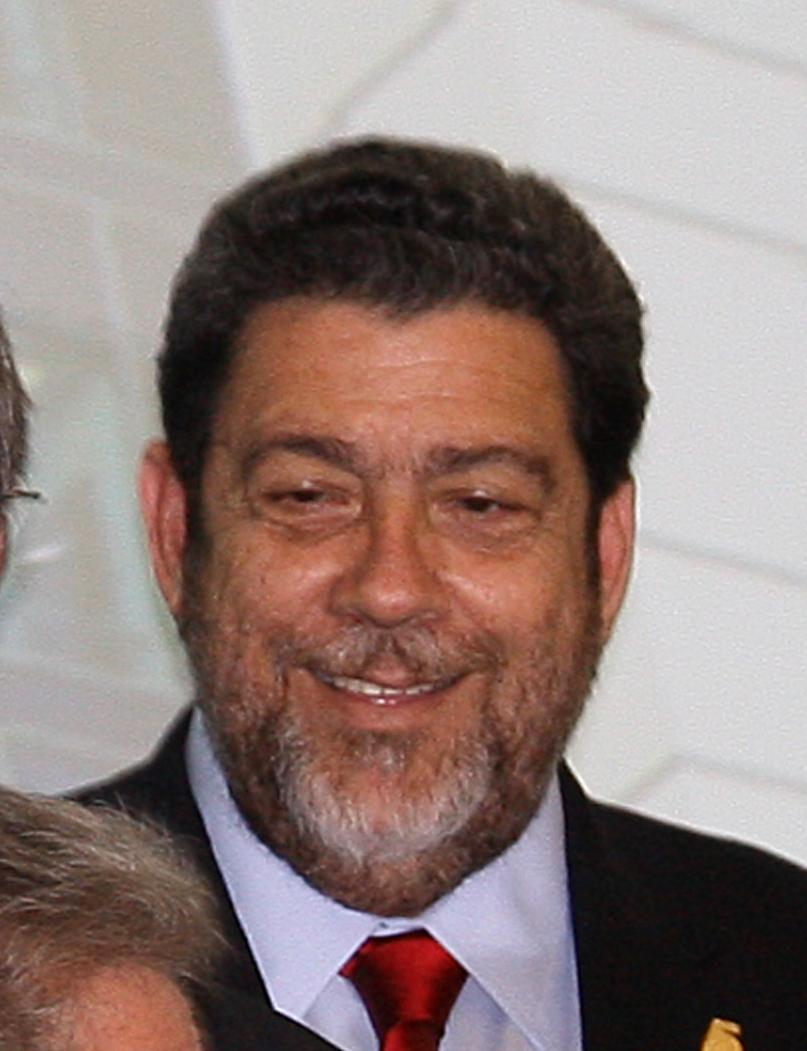

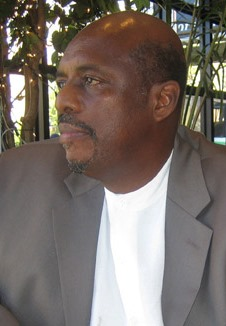
	First party	Second party
Leader	Ralph Gonsalves	Arnhim Eustace
Party	Unity Labour	New Democratic
Leader since	6 December 1998	27 October 2000
Leader's seat	North Central Windward	East Kingstown
Last election	55.26%, 12 seats	44.68%, 3 seats
Seats won	8	7
Seat change	▼4	▲4
Popular vote	32,099	30,568
Percentage	51.11%	48.67%
Swing	▼4.15pp	▲3.99pp
- Results by constituency
Prime Minister before election
Ralph Gonsalves
Unity Labour
Elected Prime Minister
Ralph Gonsalves
Unity Labour

General elections were held in Saint Vincent and the Grenadines on 13 December 2010. The result was a victory for the Unity Labour Party, which won eight of the fifteen seats in the House of Assembly.

== Background ==
The date of the elections was announced at the Calliaqua Playing Field by Prime Minister Ralph Gonsalves on 14 November 2010. It was also announced that parliament would be dissolved on 15 November and nomination day would be on 26 November.

== Campaign ==
A total of 44 candidates contested the elections; the Unity Labour Party and the New Democratic Party both fielded a full slate of 15 candidates, whilst the Green Party had 14 candidates.

== Results ==
Party	Votes	%	Seats	+/–
Unity Labour Party	32,099	51.11	8	–4
New Democratic Party	30,568	48.67	7	+4
Green Party	138	0.22	0	0
Total	62,805	100.00	15	0
Valid votes	62,805	99.70		
Invalid/blank votes	188	0.30		
Total votes	62,993	100.00		
Registered voters/turnout	101,067	62.33		
Source: Electoral Office
