= Susan Dougan =

Governor-General of Saint Vincent and the Grenadines from 2019 to 2026

Dame Susan Dougan GCMG OBE
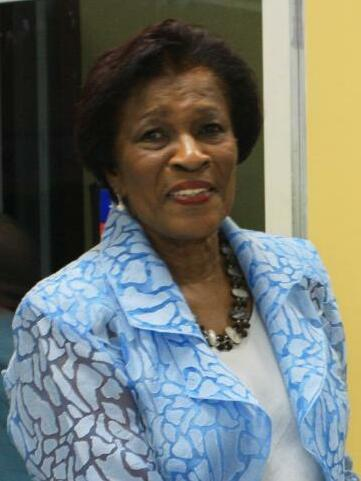
- Dougan in 2019

Governor-General of Saint Vincent and the Grenadines
- In office 1 August 2019 – 5 January 2026
- Monarchs: Elizabeth II; Charles III
- Prime Minister: Ralph Gonsalves; Godwin Friday
- Preceded by: Frederick Ballantyne
- Succeeded by: Stanley John

Personal details
- Born: Susan Dilys Ryan; 3 March 1955 (age 71) Colonarie, Saint Vincent, British Windward Islands (Now Saint Vincent and the Grenadines)
- Spouse: Hugh Dougan
- Children: 3
- Education: University of London; University of Southampton

Dame Susan Dilys Dougan (née Ryan; born 3 March 1955) is a Vincentian diplomat who served as Governor-General of Saint Vincent and the Grenadines from 2019 to 2026. She is the first woman to hold the office.

She was appointed Dame Grand Cross of the Order of St Michael and St George on 29 January 2020 and was appointed an Officer of the Order of the British Empire in the Queen's 2010 Birthday Honours List for "services to education and to public administration."

== Early life and education ==
Susan Dilys Dougan was born in the village of Colonarie in Saint Vincent. She holds a MA (Ed) in Curriculum and Evaluation from the University of Southampton, Hampshire, England.

== Career ==
Dougan began her career as a non-graduate teacher. Over a 34-year career, Dougan rose through the ranks of the teaching service to Headmistress of the St. Vincent Girls High School (2001–2004), and later served as Chief Education Officer from 2004 to 2009. She also served as Cabinet Secretary from October 2009 to September 2013.

Dougan has also served in several other national capacities such as Representative to the Organization of American States for St. Vincent and the Grenadines, Representative to the Commonwealth of Learning for St. Vincent and the Grenadines, and Chief Shelter Manager for St. Vincent and the Grenadines.

She was appointed as the Deputy Governor General in December 2014. She was sworn in as the first female Governor-General of St. Vincent and the Grenadines on 1 August 2019. She was administered the oaths of Office and Allegiance by High Court Justice Brian Cottle during a ceremony witnessed by state officials as well as relatives, friends, and the media.

== Gallery ==
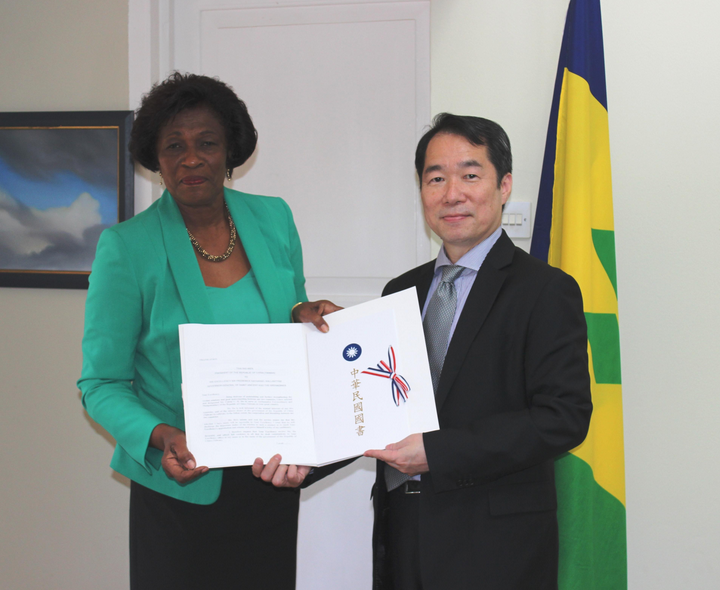
Dougan with Ambassador Calvin Ho of Republic of China (Taiwan) to St. Vincent, 2018

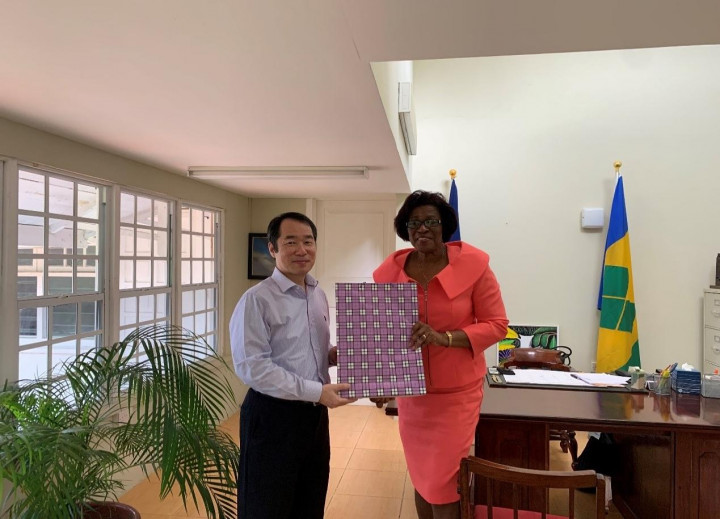
Dougan and Ambassador Ho, 2018

Dame Dougan meets President Ram Nath Kovind of India, 2022.

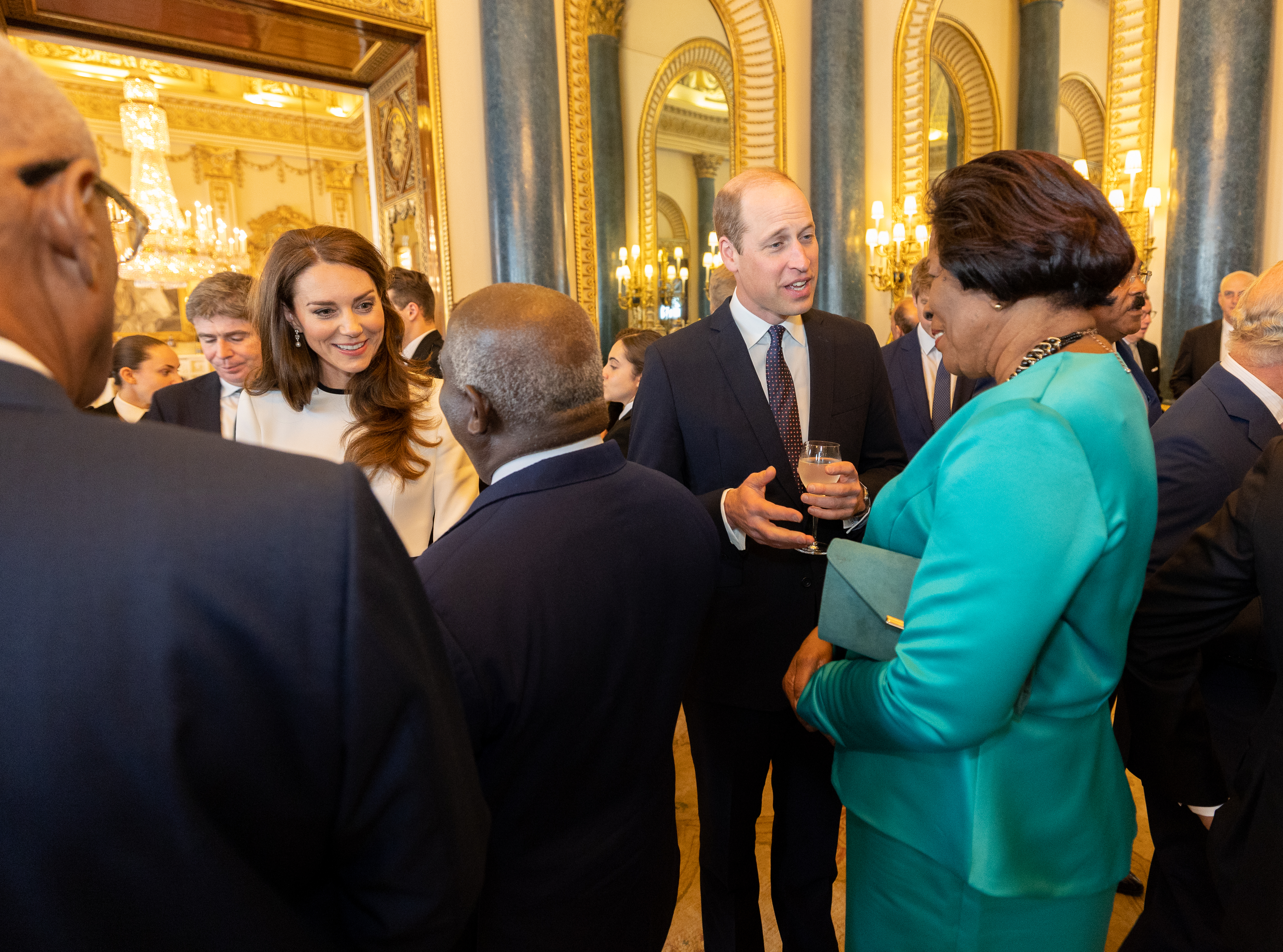
Dougan conversing with William, Prince of Wales and Catherine, Princess of Wales during a Commonwealth Realms Coronation Event at Buckingham Palace, 2023

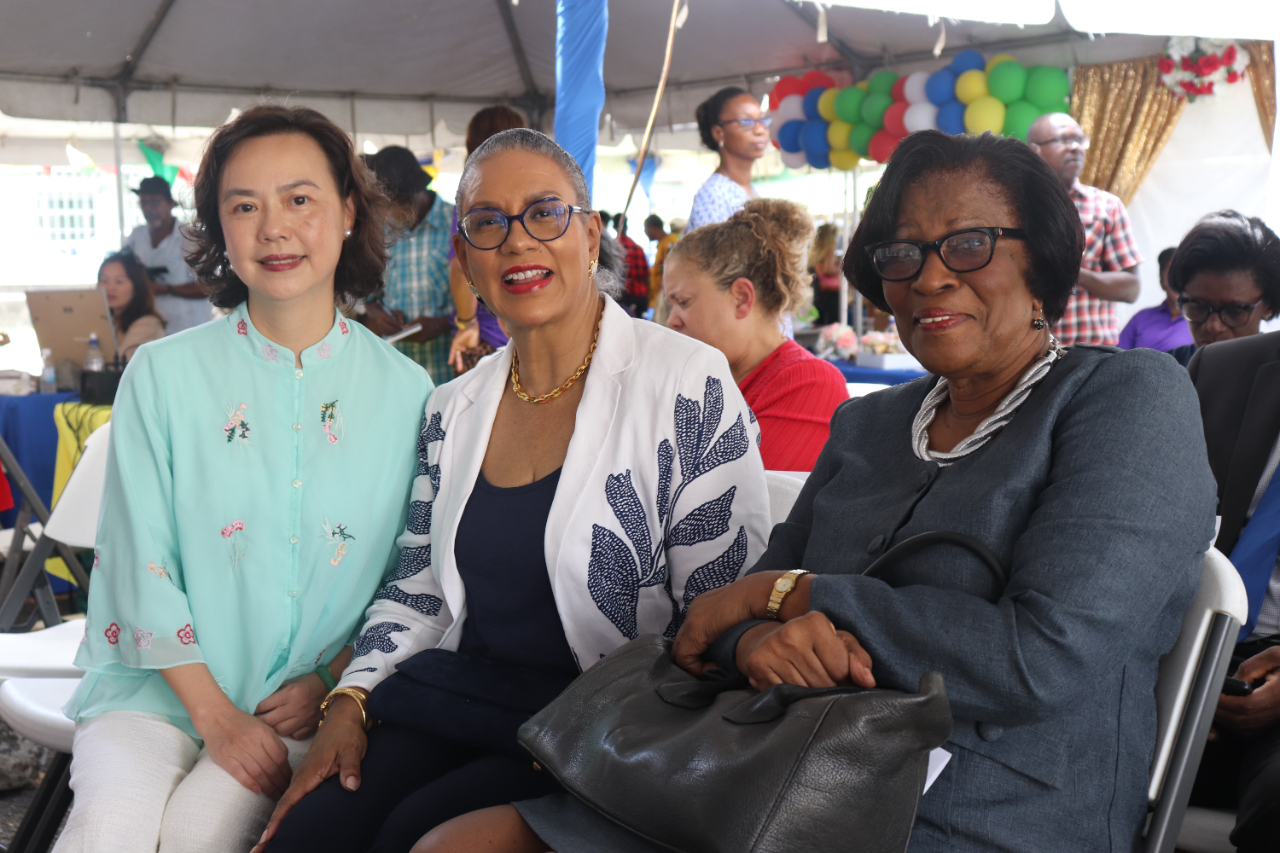
Taiwanese ambassador Fiona Huei-chun Fan, Eloise Gonsalves (wife of Prime Minister Dr. Ralph Gonsalves), and Dougan at the Women's Empowerment Project Showcase in the Court House Yard, 2024

Government offices
Preceded by Frederick Ballantyne	Governor-General of Saint Vincent and the Grenadines; 2019–2026	Succeeded by Stanley John
