= House of Assembly of Saint Vincent and the Grenadines =

Unicameral legislature of Saint Vincent and the Grenadines

- 12th Vincentian Assembly

Type
- Type: Unicameral house of the Parliament of Saint Vincent and the Grenadines

Leadership
- Speaker: Ronnia Durham-Balcombe, NDP since 23 December 2025
- Prime Minister: Godwin Friday, NDP since 28 November 2025
- Leader of the Opposition: Ralph Gonsalves, ULP since 1 December 2025

Structure
- Seats: 23 members
- Political groups: His Majesty's Government (14): NDP (14); His Majesty's Loyal Opposition (1): ULP (1); Senators (6): Pro-government senators (4); Pro-opposition senators (2); Other members (2): Speaker (1); Attorney General (1)

Elections
- Voting system: Plurality voting for MPs. All senators are appointed by the Governor-General.
- Last election: 27 November 2025

Website
- assembly.gov.vc/assembly/

The House of Assembly of Saint Vincent and the Grenadines is the unicameral legislature of Saint Vincent and the Grenadines. The Vincentian monarch and the House of Assembly constitute the Parliament of Saint Vincent and the Grenadines.

The House has a total of 23 members:

- Fifteen represent single member constituencies and are elected using plurality voting, also known as "first past the post".
- Six are known as senators, and are appointed by the Governor-General. Four senators are appointed to represent the government and two to represent the opposition.
- One member is the attorney-general, who is appointed
- One member is the speaker, who is elected by the House

The most recent elections to the House of Assembly were held on 27 November 2025. The New Democratic Party (NDP) under the leadership of Godwin Friday won 14 out of 15 elected seats, creating the first NDP government in nearly 25 years. The Unity Labour Party (ULP) retained only the seat of Ralph Gonsalves, the former prime minister, who formed the new opposition.

== See also ==
- List of speakers of the House of Assembly of Saint Vincent and the Grenadines
- Politics of Saint Vincent and the Grenadines
- List of legislatures by country
