= Index of Saint Vincent and the Grenadines–related articles =

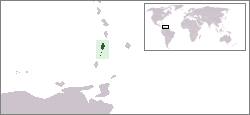
The location of Saint Vincent and the Grenadines

The following is an alphabetical list of topics related to the nation of Saint Vincent and the Grenadines.

== 0–9 ==
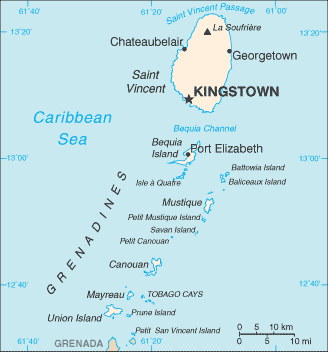
A map of Saint Vincent and the Grenadines

- .vc – Internet country code top-level domain for Saint Vincent and the Grenadines

== A ==
- Americas
  - North America
    - North Atlantic Ocean
      - West Indies
        - Caribbean Sea
          - Antilles
            - Lesser Antilles
              - Islands of Saint Vincent and the Grenadines
- Anglo-America
- Antilles
- Atlas of Saint Vincent and the Grenadines

== B ==
- Saint Vincent and the Grenadines Botanic Gardens

== C ==
- Capital of Saint Vincent and the Grenadines: Kingstown on Saint Vincent
- Caribbean
- Caribbean Community (CARICOM)
- Caribbean Sea
- Categories:
  - Category:Saint Vincent and the Grenadines
    - Category:Buildings and structures in Saint Vincent and the Grenadines
    - Category:Communications in Saint Vincent and the Grenadines
    - Category:Economy of Saint Vincent and the Grenadines
    - Category:Education in Saint Vincent and the Grenadines
    - Category:Environment of Saint Vincent and the Grenadines
    - Category:Geography of Saint Vincent and the Grenadines
    - Category:Government of Saint Vincent and the Grenadines
    - Category:History of Saint Vincent and the Grenadines
    - Category:Military of Saint Vincent and the Grenadines
    - Category:Politics of Saint Vincent and the Grenadines
    - Category:Saint Vincent and the Grenadines stubs
    - Category:Saint Vincent and the Grenadines-related lists
    - Category:Sport in Saint Vincent and the Grenadines
    - Category:Transport in Saint Vincent and the Grenadines
    - Category:Vincentian culture
    - Category:Vincentian people
    - Category:Vincentian society
  - commons:Category:Saint Vincent and the Grenadines
- Coat of arms of Saint Vincent and the Grenadines
- Commonwealth of Nations
- Commonwealth realm of Saint Vincent and the Grenadines
- Communications in Saint Vincent and the Grenadines
- Cricket in the West Indies

== D ==
- Demographics of Saint Vincent and the Grenadines

== E ==
- Economy of Saint Vincent and the Grenadines
- Electric power in Saint Vincent and the Grenadines
- English colonization of the Americas
- English language

== F ==
The Flag of Saint Vincent and the Grenadines

- Flag of Saint Vincent and the Grenadines
- Foreign relations of Saint Vincent and the Grenadines

== G ==
- Geography of Saint Vincent and the Grenadines

== H ==
- History of Saint Vincent and the Grenadines

== I ==
- International Organization for Standardization (ISO)
  - ISO 3166-1 alpha-2 country code for Saint Vincent and the Grenadines: VC
  - ISO 3166-1 alpha-3 country code for Saint Vincent and the Grenadines: VCT
  - ISO 3166-2:VC region codes for Saint Vincent and the Grenadines
- Islands of Saint Vincent and the Grenadines:
  - Saint Vincent (island)
  - All Awash Island
  - Baliceaux Island
  - Battowia Island
  - Bequia
  - Canouan Island
  - Catholic Island
  - Chateaubelair Island
  - Church Cay
  - Cow And Calves Islands
  - Dike Island
  - Dove Cay
  - Dove Island
  - Duvernette Islet
  - Frigate Island, Grenadines
  - L'Islot
  - Mayreau
  - Milligan Cay
  - Mustique
  - Nevis Island
  - Palm Island, Grenadines
  - Petit Cannouan
  - Petit Cay
  - Petit Mustique
  - Petit Nevis
  - Petit Saint Vincent
  - Petit Tabac
  - Pigeon Island, Grenadines
  - Pillories, Grenadines
  - Quatre Isle
  - Rabbit Island, Grenadines
  - Red Island, Grenadines
  - Saint Elairs Cay
  - Sand Cay, Grenadines
  - Savan Island
  - Tobago Cays
  - Union Island
  - Young Island, Grenadines

== K ==
- Kevin Lyttle
- Kingstown on Saint Vincent – Capital of Saint Vincent and the Grenadines

== L ==
- LGBT rights in Saint Vincent and the Grenadines (Gay rights)
- Lists related to Saint Vincent and the Grenadines:
  - Diplomatic missions of Saint Vincent and the Grenadines
  - List of cities in Saint Vincent and the Grenadines
  - List of diplomatic missions in Saint Vincent and the Grenadines
  - List of islands of Saint Vincent and the Grenadines
  - List of rivers of Saint Vincent and the Grenadines
  - List of Saint Vincent and the Grenadines-related topics
  - Topic outline of Saint Vincent and the Grenadines

== M ==
- Military of Saint Vincent and the Grenadines
- Monarchy of Saint Vincent and the Grenadines
- Music of Saint Vincent and the Grenadines

== O ==
- Organisation of Eastern Caribbean States (OECS)

== P ==
- People of Saint Vincent and the Grenadines
- Politics of Saint Vincent and the Grenadines

== R ==
- Regions of Saint Vincent and the Grenadines
- Religion in Saint Vincent and the Grenadines

== S ==
- Saint Vincent and the Grenadines
- The Scout Association of Saint Vincent and the Grenadines
- Scouting in Saint Vincent and the Grenadines
- States headed by Elizabeth II

== T ==
- Topic outline of Saint Vincent and the Grenadines
- Transport in Saint Vincent and the Grenadines

== U ==
- United Nations, member state since 1980

== W ==
- Water supply and sanitation in Saint Vincent and the Grenadines
- Wesley Charles
- Wikimedia Atlas of Saint Vincent and the Grenadines
- Wikipedia:WikiProject Topic outline/Drafts/Topic outline of Saint Vincent and the Grenadines

== See also ==
- Commonwealth of Nations
- List of Caribbean-related topics
- List of international rankings
- Lists of country-related topics
- Topic outline of geography
- Topic outline of North America
- Topic outline of Saint Vincent and the Grenadines
- United Nations
