= Outline of Saint Vincent and the Grenadines =

Overview of and topical guide to Saint Vincent and the Grenadines

The Flag of Saint Vincent and the Grenadines

The Coat of arms of Saint Vincent and the Grenadines

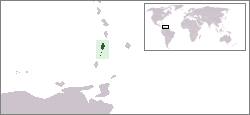
The location of Saint Vincent and the Grenadines

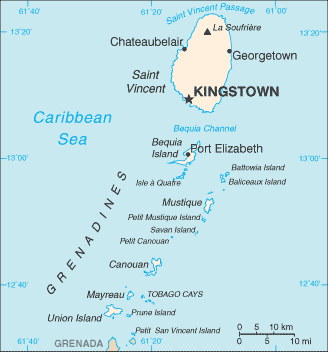
An enlargeable map of Saint Vincent and the Grenadines

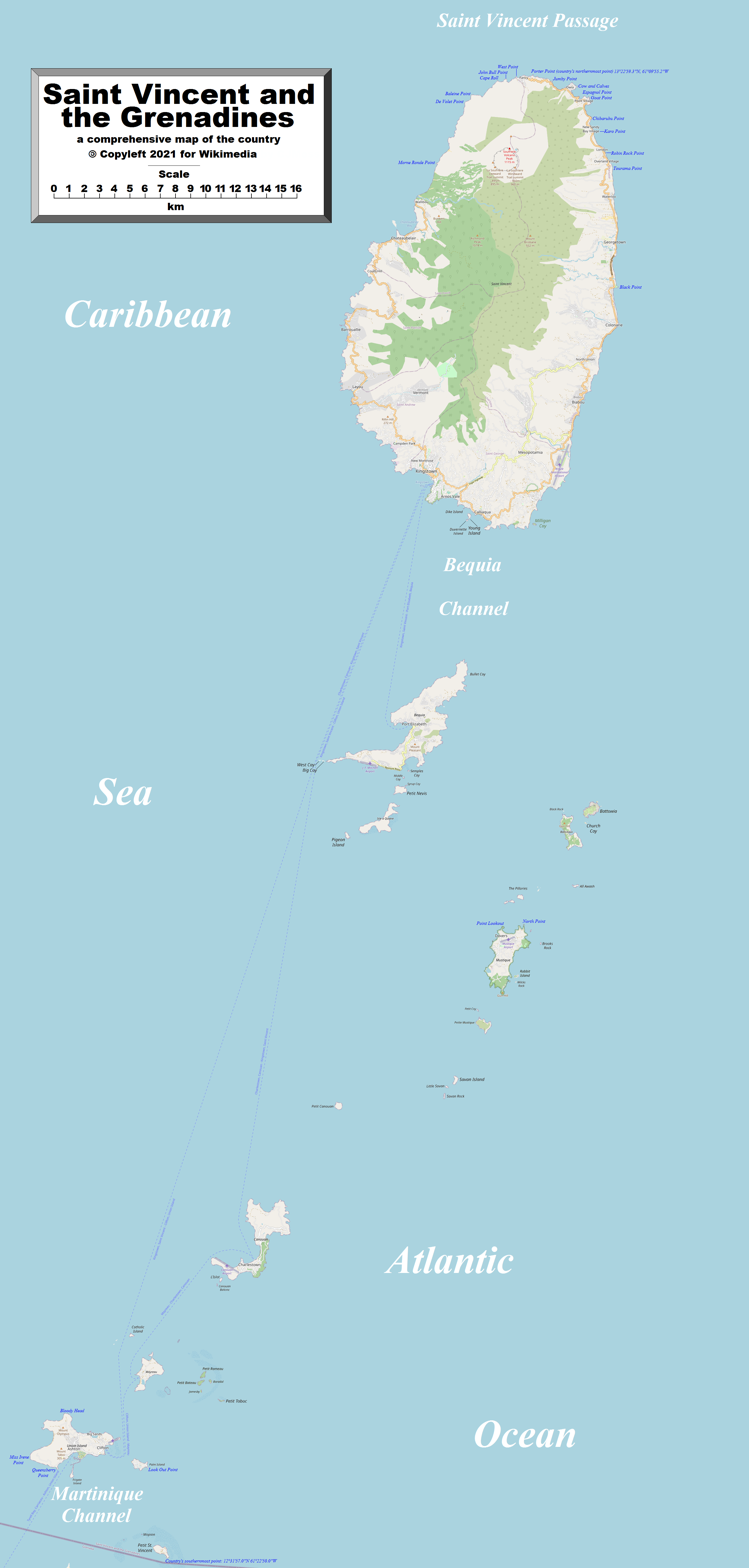
An enlargeable, detailed map of Saint Vincent and the Grenadines

The following outline is provided as an overview of and topical guide to Saint Vincent and the Grenadines:

Saint Vincent and the Grenadines is a sovereign island nation located in the Lesser Antilles archipelago in the Caribbean Sea. Its 389-square-kilometre (150 sq mi) territory consists of the main island of Saint Vincent and the northern two-thirds of the Grenadines. The country has a French and British colonial history and is now part of the Commonwealth of Nations and CARICOM.

== General reference ==
- Pronunciation:
- Common English country name: Saint Vincent and the Grenadines
- Official English country name: Saint Vincent and the Grenadines
- Common endonym: Saint Vincent and the Grenadines
- Official endonym: Saint Vincent and the Grenadines
- Adjectival(s):
- Demonym(s):
- Etymology: Name of Saint Vincent and the Grenadines
- ISO country codes: VC, VCT, 670
- ISO region codes: See ISO 3166-2:VC
- Internet country code top-level domain: .vc

== Geography of Saint Vincent and the Grenadines ==
Geography of Saint Vincent and the Grenadines

- Saint Vincent and the Grenadines is:
  - an archipelago
  - a country
    - an island country
    - a nation state
    - a Commonwealth realm
- Location:
  - Northern Hemisphere and Western Hemisphere
    - North America (though not on the mainland)
  - Atlantic Ocean
    - North Atlantic
      - Caribbean
        - Antilles
          - Lesser Antilles
            - Windward Islands
              - Saint Vincent (island) and the northern two-thirds of the Grenadines
  - Time zone: Eastern Caribbean Time (UTC-04)
  - Extreme points of Saint Vincent and the Grenadines
    - High: Soufrière 1,234 m (4,049 ft)
    - Low: Caribbean Sea 0 m
  - Land boundaries: none
  - Coastline: 84 km
- Population of Saint Vincent and the Grenadines: 120,000 - 182nd most populous country
- Area of Saint Vincent and the Grenadines: 389
- Atlas of Saint Vincent and the Grenadines

=== Environment of Saint Vincent and the Grenadines ===
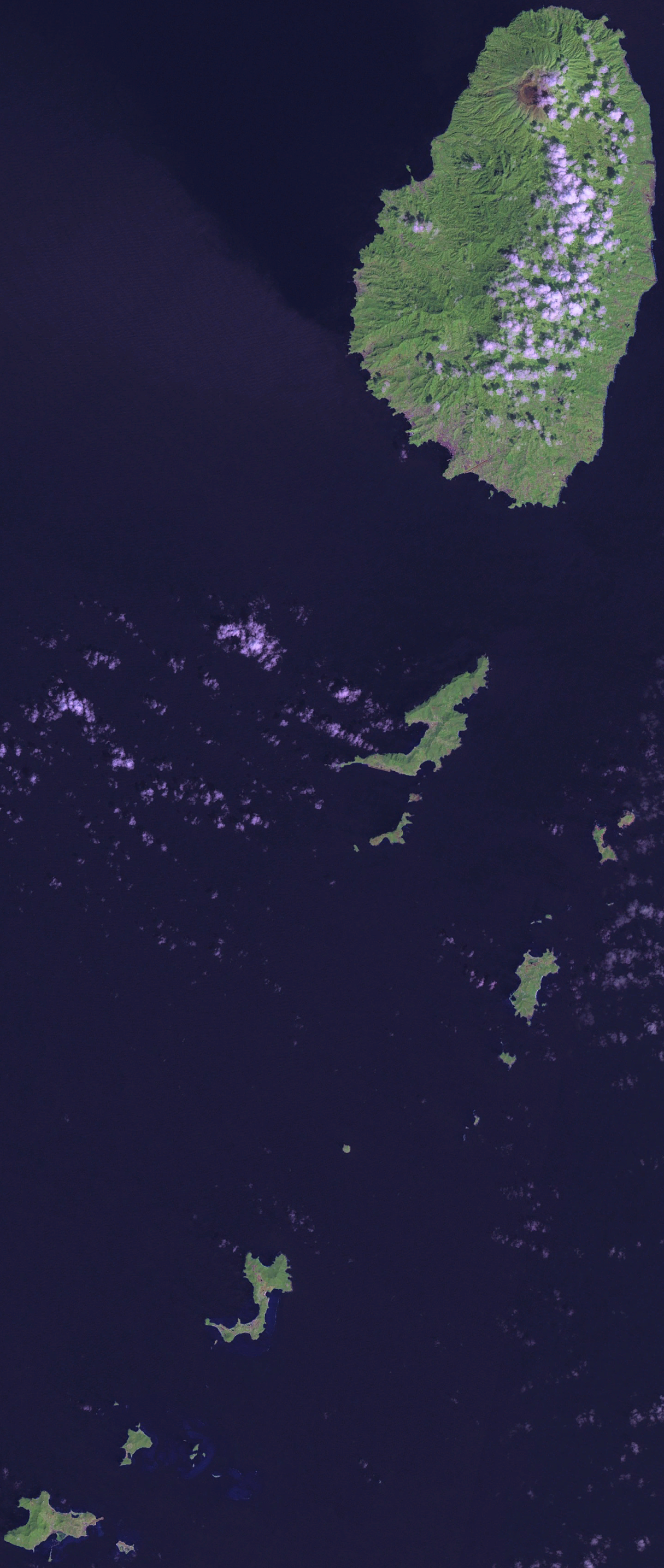
An enlargeable satellite image of Saint Vincent and the Grenadines

- Climate of Saint Vincent and the Grenadines
- Renewable energy in Saint Vincent and the Grenadines
- Geology of Saint Vincent and the Grenadines
- Protected areas of Saint Vincent and the Grenadines
  - Biosphere reserves in Saint Vincent and the Grenadines
  - National parks of Saint Vincent and the Grenadines
- Wildlife of Saint Vincent and the Grenadines
  - Fauna of Saint Vincent and the Grenadines
    - Birds of Saint Vincent and the Grenadines
    - Mammals of Saint Vincent and the Grenadines

==== Natural geographic features of Saint Vincent and the Grenadines ====
- Fjords of Saint Vincent and the Grenadines
- Glaciers of Saint Vincent and the Grenadines
- Islands of Saint Vincent and the Grenadines
- Lakes of Saint Vincent and the Grenadines
- Mountains of Saint Vincent and the Grenadines
  - Volcanoes in Saint Vincent and the Grenadines
- Rivers of Saint Vincent and the Grenadines
  - Waterfalls of Saint Vincent and the Grenadines
- Valleys of Saint Vincent and the Grenadines
- World Heritage Sites in Saint Vincent and the Grenadines: None

=== Regions of Saint Vincent and the Grenadines ===
Regions of Saint Vincent and the Grenadines

==== Ecoregions of Saint Vincent and the Grenadines ====
List of ecoregions in Saint Vincent and the Grenadines

- Ecoregions in Saint Vincent and the Grenadines

=== Demography of Saint Vincent and the Grenadines ===
Demographics of Saint Vincent and the Grenadines

== Government and politics of Saint Vincent and the Grenadines ==
Politics of Saint Vincent and the Grenadines

- Form of government:
- Capital of Saint Vincent and the Grenadines: Kingstown
- Elections in Saint Vincent and the Grenadines
- Political parties in Saint Vincent and the Grenadines

=== Branches of the government of Saint Vincent and the Grenadines ===
Government of Saint Vincent and the Grenadines

==== Executive branch of the government of Saint Vincent and the Grenadines ====
- Head of state: King of Saint Vincent and the Grenadines, King Charles III
- Head of government: Prime Minister of Saint Vincent and the Grenadines,
- Cabinet of Saint Vincent and the Grenadines

==== Legislative branch of the government of Saint Vincent and the Grenadines ====
- Parliament of Saint Vincent and the Grenadines (bicameral)
  - Upper house: Senate of Saint Vincent and the Grenadines
  - Lower house: House of Commons of Saint Vincent and the Grenadines

==== Judicial branch of the government of Saint Vincent and the Grenadines ====
Court system of Saint Vincent and the Grenadines

- Supreme Court of Saint Vincent and the Grenadines

=== Foreign relations of Saint Vincent and the Grenadines ===
Foreign relations of Saint Vincent and the Grenadines

- Diplomatic missions in Saint Vincent and the Grenadines
- Diplomatic missions of Saint Vincent and the Grenadines

==== International organization membership ====
Saint Vincent and the Grenadines is a member of:

- African, Caribbean, and Pacific Group of States (ACP)
- Agency for the Prohibition of Nuclear Weapons in Latin America and the Caribbean (OPANAL)
- Caribbean Community and Common Market (Caricom)
- Caribbean Development Bank (CDB)
- Commonwealth of Nations
- Food and Agriculture Organization (FAO)
- Group of 77 (G77)
- International Bank for Reconstruction and Development (IBRD)
- International Civil Aviation Organization (ICAO)
- International Criminal Court (ICCt) (signatory)
- International Criminal Police Organization (Interpol)
- International Development Association (IDA)
- International Federation of Red Cross and Red Crescent Societies (IFRCS)
- International Fund for Agricultural Development (IFAD)
- International Labour Organization (ILO)
- International Maritime Organization (IMO)
- International Monetary Fund (IMF)
- International Olympic Committee (IOC)
- International Organization for Standardization (ISO) (subscriber)
- International Red Cross and Red Crescent Movement (ICRM)
- International Telecommunication Union (ITU)
- International Trade Union Confederation (ITUC)
- Multilateral Investment Guarantee Agency (MIGA)
- Nonaligned Movement (NAM)
- Organisation for the Prohibition of Chemical Weapons (OPCW)
- Organization of American States (OAS)
- Organization of Eastern Caribbean States (OECS)
- United Nations (UN)
- United Nations Conference on Trade and Development (UNCTAD)
- United Nations Educational, Scientific, and Cultural Organization (UNESCO)
- United Nations Industrial Development Organization (UNIDO)
- Universal Postal Union (UPU)
- World Confederation of Labour (WCL)
- World Federation of Trade Unions (WFTU)
- World Health Organization (WHO)
- World Intellectual Property Organization (WIPO)
- World Trade Organization (WTO)

=== Law and order in Saint Vincent and the Grenadines ===
Law of Saint Vincent and the Grenadines

- Constitution of Saint Vincent and the Grenadines
- Crime in Saint Vincent and the Grenadines
- Human rights in Saint Vincent and the Grenadines
  - LGBT rights in Saint Vincent and the Grenadines
  - Freedom of religion in Saint Vincent and the Grenadines
- Law enforcement in Saint Vincent and the Grenadines

=== Military of Saint Vincent and the Grenadines ===
Military of Saint Vincent and the Grenadines

- Command
  - Commander-in-chief:
    - Ministry of Defence of Saint Vincent and the Grenadines

=== Local government in Saint Vincent and the Grenadines ===
Local government in Saint Vincent and the Grenadines

== History of Saint Vincent and the Grenadines ==
History of Saint Vincent and the Grenadines

- Timeline of the history of Saint Vincent and the Grenadines
- Portal: Current events/Saint Vincent and the Grenadines|Current events of Saint Vincent and the Grenadines
- Military history of Saint Vincent and the Grenadines

== Culture of Saint Vincent and the Grenadines ==
Culture of Saint Vincent and the Grenadines

- Architecture of Saint Vincent and the Grenadines
- Cuisine of Saint Vincent and the Grenadines
- Festivals in Saint Vincent and the Grenadines
- Languages of Saint Vincent and the Grenadines
- Media in Saint Vincent and the Grenadines
- National symbols of Saint Vincent and the Grenadines
  - Coat of arms of Saint Vincent and the Grenadines
  - Flag of Saint Vincent and the Grenadines
  - National anthem of Saint Vincent and the Grenadines
- People of Saint Vincent and the Grenadines
- Public holidays in Saint Vincent and the Grenadines
- Records of Saint Vincent and the Grenadines
- Religion in Saint Vincent and the Grenadines
  - Christianity in Saint Vincent and the Grenadines
  - Hinduism in Saint Vincent and the Grenadines
  - Islam in Saint Vincent and the Grenadines
  - Judaism in Saint Vincent and the Grenadines
  - Sikhism in Saint Vincent and the Grenadines
- World Heritage Sites in Saint Vincent and the Grenadines: None

=== Art in Saint Vincent and the Grenadines ===
- Art in Saint Vincent and the Grenadines
- Cinema of Saint Vincent and the Grenadines
- Literature of Saint Vincent and the Grenadines
- Music of Saint Vincent and the Grenadines
- Television in Saint Vincent and the Grenadines
- Theatre in Saint Vincent and the Grenadines

=== Sports in Saint Vincent and the Grenadines ===
Sport in Saint Vincent and the Grenadines

- Football in Saint Vincent and the Grenadines
- Saint Vincent and the Grenadines at the Olympics

== Economy and infrastructure of Saint Vincent and the Grenadines ==
Economy of Saint Vincent and the Grenadines

- Economic rank, by nominal GDP (2007): 175th (one hundred and seventy fifth)
- Agriculture in Saint Vincent and the Grenadines
- Banking in Saint Vincent and the Grenadines
  - National Bank of Saint Vincent and the Grenadines
- Communications in Saint Vincent and the Grenadines
  - Internet in Saint Vincent and the Grenadines
- Companies of Saint Vincent and the Grenadines
- Currency of Saint Vincent and the Grenadines: Dollar
  - ISO 4217: XCD
- Energy in Saint Vincent and the Grenadines
  - Energy policy of Saint Vincent and the Grenadines
  - Oil industry in Saint Vincent and the Grenadines
- Mining in Saint Vincent and the Grenadines
- Tourism in Saint Vincent and the Grenadines
- Transport in Saint Vincent and the Grenadines
- Saint Vincent and the Grenadines Stock Exchange

== Education in Saint Vincent and the Grenadines ==
Education in Saint Vincent and the Grenadines

== Infrastructure of Saint Vincent and the Grenadines ==
- Health in Saint Vincent and the Grenadines
- Transportation in Saint Vincent and the Grenadines
  - Airports in Saint Vincent and the Grenadines
  - Rail transport in Saint Vincent and the Grenadines
  - Roads in Saint Vincent and the Grenadines
- Water supply and sanitation in Saint Vincent and the Grenadines

== See also ==
Saint Vincent and the Grenadines

- Index of Saint Vincent and the Grenadines-related articles
- List of international rankings
- List of Saint Vincent and the Grenadines-related topics
- Member state of the Commonwealth of Nations
- Member state of the United Nations
- Monarchy of Saint Vincent and the Grenadines
- Outline of geography
- Outline of North America
- Outline of the Caribbean
