= Geography of Saint Vincent and the Grenadines =

Coordinates: 13°10′N 61°14′W

Map of Saint Vincent and the Grenadines

Saint Vincent and the Grenadines is an island state in the Windward Islands of the Lesser Antilles, an island arc of the Caribbean Sea in North America. The country consists of the main island of Saint Vincent and the northern two-thirds of the Grenadines, a chain of small islands stretching south from Saint Vincent to Grenada. Its total land area is 390 km^{2} of which 342.7 km^{2} is the main island of Saint Vincent. The country's capital is at Kingstown on Saint Vincent.

== Table of Islands ==
The main island of Saint Vincent and the Grenadines is Saint Vincent. Its geography is mostly mountainous and includes very little level ground. There is also a large difference between the coastlines on each side of the island; the windward side is very rocky, while the leeward side consists of many sandy beaches and has many more bays. The island's (as well as the country's) highest peak is the volcanic Soufrière at 1,234 m. There are several tiny islets offshore of Saint Vincent including Young Island and the Cow And Calves Islands.

List of islands from north to south:

Nr	Island (Note: The Islands area and population data retrieved from the 2012 census)	Capital or largest town	Other inhabited areas	Area (km^{2})	Population
1	St. Vincent Group	Kingstown	Georgetown, Byera Village, Biabou, Chateaubelair	342.8	109,010
1.1	St. Vincent Island	Kingstown	Georgetown, Byera Village, Biabou, Chateaubelair	342.7	109,000
1.2	Young Island, Fort Duvernette Island	Young Island dock	Ilha de Forte, South Point, Sunset Point	0.07	10
1.3	Other Islands	Black Rock, Cheataubelair Islet, Cow And Calves Islands, Milligan Cay		0.03	0
2	Grenadines (Northern)	Port Elizabeth	Dover, Derrick, Ashton, Bednoe, Charlestown, Cheltenham, Clifton, Friendship, Lovell, Old Wall, Paget Farm, Hamilton	47.23	11,000
2.1	Bequia	Port Elizabeth	Hamilton, Belmont, Paget Farm, Derrick	17.00	5,900
2.2	Petite Nevis	Eileen Corea mansion		0.29	0
2.3	Quatre	Grand Bay	Mitchell Mansion	1.52	0
2.4	Bettowia	Landing Point		0.71	0
2.5	Baliceaux	Landing Bay		1.29	0
2.6	Mustique	Lovell	Britannia Bay, Dover	5.70	800
2.7	Petite Mustique			0.40	0
2.8	Savan	North Point		0.11	0
2.9	Petite Canouan			0.20	0
2.10	Canouan	Charlestown	Nen's Bay, Glossy, Taffia, Friendship, Barbruce, Riley Bay, Carenage, Mysore Bay, Mahault Bay, L’Ance Guyac, Cato Bay	7.60	1,200
2.11	Mayreau	Old Wall	L’Ance Bandeau, Saltwhistle bay, Saline Bay, Windward Bay	2.10	280
2.12	Tobago Cays		Petit Bateau, Petit Rameau, Baradol, Jamesby, Petit Tabac	0.25	0
2.13	Union Island	Clifton	Ashton	9.00	2,700
2.14	Mopion			0.002	0
2.15	Petit Saint Vincent	Telescope Hill	West End Beach, Caribbean Beach, Windy Hill, Windy Harbour, Cross Point, Chevalier Point, Atlantic Beach, Conch Bay	0.46	80
2.16	Palm Island	Cactus Hill	Sunset Grill Beach, North Beach	0.54	30
2.17	Other Islands		Catholic Island, Church Cay, Rashlandia, Dove Cay, Frigate Island, Little Savan, Pigeon Island, The Pillories, Rabbit Island, Red Island, St Elairs Cay, Samples Cay, Savan Rock	0.06	0
	Saint Vincent and the Grenadines	Kingstown	Georgetown, Byera Village, Biabou, P. Elizabeth, Chateaubelair	390	120,000

The remainder of the Grenadines to the south are administered by Grenada.

== Resources and land use ==
Natural resources: hydropower, cropland

Land use:
arable land: 10%
permanent crops: 18%
permanent pastures: 5%
forests and woodland: 36%
other: 31% (1993 est.)

== Extreme points ==
- Northernmost point: West Point, Charlotte Parish/Saint David Parish
- Easternmost point: Black Point, Charlotte Parish
- Southernmost point (St Vincent only): Headland near Johnson Point, Saint George Parish
- Southernmost point: Cross Pointe, Petit Saint Vincent, Grenadines Parish
- Westernmost point (St Vincent only): Headland west of Bambaroo, Saint Patrick Parish
- Westernmost point: Miss Irene Point, Union Island, Grenadines Parish

Irrigated land: 10 km^{2} (1993 est.)

Natural hazards: hurricanes; Soufrière on the island of Saint Vincent is a constant threat

Environment - current issues: pollution of coastal waters and shorelines from discharges by pleasure yachts and other effluents; in some areas, pollution is severe enough to make swimming prohibitive

Environment - international agreements:
party to: Biodiversity, Climate Change, Desertification, Endangered Species, Environmental Modification, Hazardous Wastes, Law of the Sea, Ozone Layer Protection, Ship Pollution, Whaling
signed, but not ratified: Climate Change-Kyoto Protocol

Geography - note: the administration of the islands of the Grenadines group is divided between Saint Vincent and the Grenadines and Grenada

== See also ==
- Parishes of Saint Vincent and the Grenadines
- List of Caribbean islands: Saint Vincent and the Grenadines
- Outline of Saint Vincent and the Grenadines
- Index of Saint Vincent and the Grenadines-related articles
- List of cities in Saint Vincent and the Grenadines
