= Scouting and Guiding in Saint Vincent and the Grenadines =

Scouting and Guiding movement in Saint Vincent and the Grenadines

The Scout and Guide movement in Saint Vincent and the Grenadines is served by two organisations

- Girl Guides Association of Saint Vincent and the Grenadines, member of the World Association of Girl Guides and Girl Scouts
- The Scout Association of Saint Vincent and the Grenadines, member of the World Organization of the Scout Movement
