= Economy of Saint Vincent and the Grenadines =

- Currency: Eastern Caribbean dollar (2.7 per US$ fixed rate since 1976)
- Fiscal year: calendar year
- Trade organisations: CARICOM

Statistics
- GDP: ▲$0.811 billion (nominal, 2018); ▲$1.321 billion (PPP, 2018)
- GDP growth: 2.0% (2018) 0.4% (2019e); −5.5% (2020f) 4.0% (2021f)
- GDP per capita: ▲$9,360 (nominal, 2023 est.); ▲$11,970 (PPP, 2018 est.)
- GDP by sector: agriculture: 8.4%; industry: 19.9%; services: 73.6% (2012 est.)
- Inflation (CPI): 2.324% (2018)
- Population below national poverty line: n/av
- Human Development Index: ▲0.728 high (2018) (94th); N/A IHDI (2018)
- Labour force: 57,520 (2007 est.)
- Labour force by occupation: agriculture 26%, industry 17%, services 57% (1980 est.)
- Unemployment: 25.8% (2017 est.)
- Main industries: tourism, food processing, Agriculture, furniture, clothing starch

External
- Exports: $68.3 million (2012 est.)
- Export goods: bananas, eddoes and dasheen (taro), arrowroot starch, tennis racquets
- Main export partners: Malaysia 33.7%; United States 9.87%; Greece 9.44%; Barbados 8.29%; Spain 6.29% (2022)
- Imports: $366.5 million (2012 est.)
- Import goods: foodstuffs, machinery and equipment, chemicals and fertilizers, minerals and fuels
- Main import partners: United States 39.7%; Trinidad and Tobago 9.6%; China 6.46% (2022)

Public finance
- Government debt: $252.2 million (31 December 2012 est.)
- Revenue: $185.2 million (2012 est.)
- Spending: $185.2 million est.
- Economic aid: $47.5 million (1995); note - EU $34.5 million (1998)
- All values, unless otherwise stated, are in US dollars.

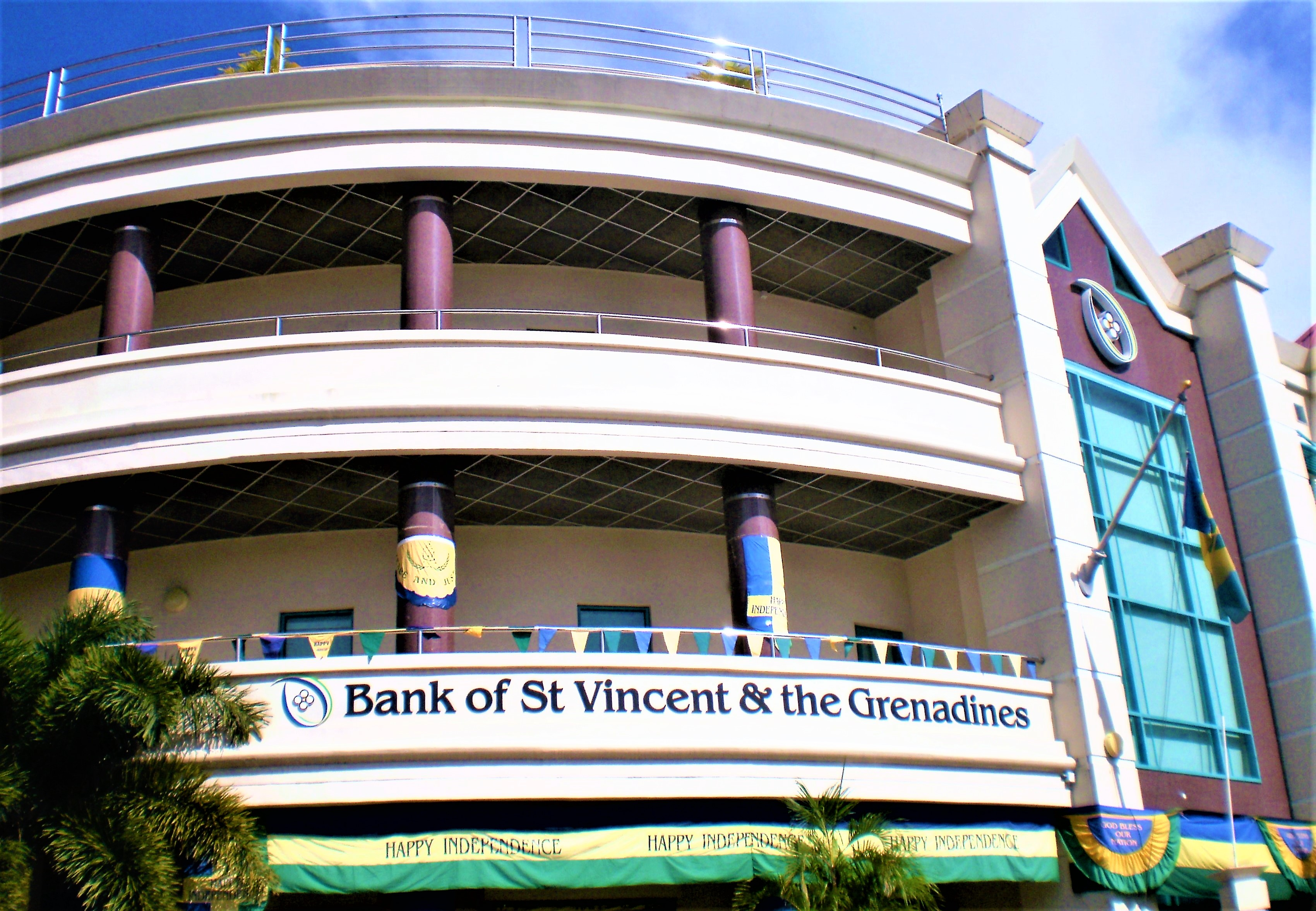
Bank of Saint Vincent and the Grenadines

The economy of Saint Vincent and the Grenadines is heavily dependent on agriculture, being the world's leading producer of arrowroot and grows other exotic fruit, vegetables and root crops. Bananas alone account for upwards of 60% of the work force and 50% of merchandise exports in Saint Vincent and the Grenadines. Such reliance on a single crop makes the economy vulnerable to external factors. St. Vincent's banana growers benefited from preferential access to the European market. In view of the European Union's announced phase-out of this preferred access, economic diversification is a priority.

Tourism has grown to become a very important part of the economy. In 1993, tourism supplanted banana exports as the chief source of foreign exchange. The Grenadines have become a favourite of the up-market yachting crowd. The trend toward increasing tourism revenues will likely continue. In 1996, new cruise ship and ferry berths came on-line, sharply increasing the number of passenger arrivals. In 1998, total visitor arrivals stood at 202,109 with United States visitors constituting 2.7%, as most of the nation's tourists are from other countries in the Caribbean and the United Kingdom. Figures from 2005 record tourism's contribution to the economy at US$90 million.

St. Vincent and the Grenadines is a beneficiary of the U.S. Caribbean Basin Initiative. The country belongs to the Caribbean Community (CARICOM), which has signed a framework agreement with the United States to promote trade and investment in the region.

== Sectors ==
=== Tourism ===
Tourist arrivals of 2024 in %

The tourism sector has considerable potential for development. The filming of the Pirates of the Caribbean films on the island has helped to expose the country to more potential visitors and investors. Recent growth has been stimulated by strong activity in the construction sector and an improvement in tourism.

=== Telecommunications ===
Telecommunications in Saint Vincent and the Grenadines is accomplished through the transmission of information by various types of technologies within Saint Vincent and the Grenadines, mainly telephones, radio, television, and the Internet.

=== Transport ===
There are no railways in Saint Vincent and the Grenadines.

As of 1996, there were 829 km of highways, of which 580 km are paved.

Ports and harbours: Kingstown

Merchant marine:
total: 825 ships (1,000 GT or over) totaling 7,253,092 GT/
ships by type: barge carrier 1, bulk 142, cargo 400, chemical tanker 31, combination bulk 10, combination ore/oil 5, container 47, liquified gas 5, livestock carrier 5, multi-functional large load carrier 3, passenger 3, petroleum tanker 60, refrigerated cargo 41, roll-on/roll-off 51, short-sea passenger 12, specialized tanker 8, vehicle carrier 1 (1999 est.)
note: a flag of convenience registry; includes ships from 20 countries among which are Croatia 17, Slovenia 7, People's Republic of China 5, Greece 5, United Arab Emirates 3, Norway 2, Japan 2, and Ukraine 2 (1998 est.)

Airports: 6 (2005)

Airports - with paved runways:
total: 5
914 to 1,523 m: 4
under 914 m: 1 (2005)

There is one airport with an unpaved runway, under 914 m (2005 est.)

== Macroeconomic statistics ==
Saint Vincent and the Grenadines electricity production by source

Name	Source	Year	Notes	Ref
GDP (PPP)
GDP (PPP)	International Monetary Fund	2015	GDP (PPP) is $1.572 billion	
GDP (PPP)	World Bank	2013	GDP (PPP) is $1,147,388,850	
GDP (PPP)	The World Factbook	2014 (Est.)	GDP (PPP) is $1,198,000,000	
GDP (PPP) per capita
GDP (PPP) per capita	International Monetary Fund	2015	GDP (PPP) per capita is $13,259.473	
GDP (PPP) per capita	World Bank	2013	GDP (PPP) per capita is $10,490.6	
GDP (PPP) per capita	The World Factbook	2014 (Est.)	GDP (PPP) per capita is $10,900	
GDP (PPP) per person employed
GDP (PPP) per person employed	World Bank	1990-2010	GDP (PPP) per person employed $13,225	
GDP (PPP) per person employed	The World Factbook	2012		
GDP (nominal)
GDP (nominal)	United Nations	2013	GDP (nominal) is $709,197,778	
GDP (nominal)	International Monetary Fund	2013	GDP (nominal) is US$0.720 billion	
GDP (nominal)	World Bank	2013	GDP (nominal) is $709,358,185	
GDP (nominal)	The World Factbook	2014 (Est.)	GDP (nominal) is $745 million	
GDP (nominal) per capita
GDP (nominal) per capita	United Nations	2013	GDP (nominal) per capita is US$6,484	
GDP (nominal) per capita	International Monetary Fund	2013 (Est.)	GDP (nominal) per capita is US$6,563.096	
GDP (nominal) per capita	World Bank	2012		
GDP (nominal) per capita	The World Factbook	2013		
Gross national income (Atlas method)	World Bank	2013	Gross national income is US$707 million	
GNI per capita (Atlas method and PPP)	World Bank	2013	Average national income (PPP) of US$6,460 per person/Year	

Household income or consumption by percentage share:

Distribution of family income - Gini index: N/A

Agriculture - products: banana, coconuts, sweet-potatoes, spices; small numbers of cattle, sheep, pigs, goats; fish

Industrial production growth rate: -0.9% (1997 estimate)

Electricity - production: 115 million kWh (2005)

Electricity - consumption: 107 million kWh (2005)

Oil - consumption: 1,500 bbl/d (240 m^{3}/d) (2005 estimate)

Current account balance: $-0.22 billion (2013 estimate)
$-0.19 billion (2012 estimate)

Reserves of foreign exchange and gold: $115 million (2013 estimate)
$111 million (2012 estimate)

2010 Index of Economic Freedom rank: 49th

Exchange rates: East Caribbean dollars per US dollar - 2.7 (2007), 2.7 (2006), 2.7 (2005), 2.7 (2003)

== See also ==
- Saint Vincent and the Grenadines
- Minister of Finance of Saint Vincent and the Grenadines
