= The Scout Association of Saint Vincent and the Grenadines =

- Location: Kingstown
- Country: Saint Vincent
- Membership: 549
- Affiliation: World Organization of the Scout Movement

The Scout Association of Saint Vincent and the Grenadines is the national Scouting organization of Saint Vincent and the Grenadines. Scouting in Saint Vincent and the Grenadines started in 1911 and became a member of the World Organization of the Scout Movement (WOSM) in 1990. The coeducational association has 549 members (as of 2010).

== History ==
Scouting in Saint Vincent and the Grenadines started in 1911 as an overseas branch of The Scout Association (UK). After the independence of Saint Vincent and the Grenadines in 1979, the national association worked towards the recognition by WOSM, which was received in 1990.

Scouts are active in regional activities, and have participated in the last few Caribbean Jamborees.

== Program and ideals ==
The association is divided in three age-groups:

- Cub Scouts (ages 7 to 11)
- Scouts (ages 12 to 15)
- Rover Scouts (ages 16 to 20)

The membership badge of the Scout Association of Saint Vincent and the Grenadines incorporates elements of the coat of arms and the palm leaf of the previous flag of Saint Vincent and the Grenadines.

== See also ==
- Girl Guides Association of Saint Vincent and the Grenadines
