= List of countries by GDP (PPP) per person employed =

This is a list of countries by their gross domestic product at purchasing power parity per person currently employed.

== List ==
=== By country ===
List of countries by GDP (constant 2021 PPP $) per person employed
Country / territory	World Bank (2024) (Note: The following countries are from 2021–23 data: Afghanistan, Bhutan, Lebanon, Palestine, South Korea, Sudan, Syria, Tonga, Ukraine, and U.S. Virgin Islands.)	Our World In Data (2023)
Luxembourg	263,891	266,899
Ireland	227,161	228,334
Guyana	222,575	153,586
Singapore	222,072	215,672
Macao	207,953	182,878
Norway	173,777	172,105
Brunei	165,413	158,266
United States	153,725	151,847
Switzerland	149,970	152,237
Qatar	149,538	154,267
Belgium	146,382	147,803
Denmark	145,348	141,564
Saudi Arabia	134,098	123,954
Hong Kong	133,530	130,597
Italy	130,122	132,083
Puerto Rico	129,842	125,434
Austria	128,887	129,790
Netherlands	128,301	132,148
Sweden	128,257	123,478
France	126,986	127,412
Germany	124,097	123,548
U.S. Virgin Islands	117,998	–
Finland	117,938	118,974
Australia	114,267	113,572
Malta	112,196	110,730
Iceland	110,336	113,804
Canada	109,417	107,092
Spain	109,265	107,401
United Arab Emirates	107,504	102,205
United Kingdom	107,229	110,753
Bahrain	103,996	99,575
Israel	103,515	106,881
Slovenia	100,823	100,441
Croatia	100,341	97,082
Romania	99,043	99,174
Czech Republic	96,613	100,620
Lithuania	95,157	94,519
Greece	93,760	92,280
Poland	92,678	91,272
Turkey	91,375	91,827
South Korea	90,534	90,465
Portugal	87,624	86,593
New Zealand	86,512	86,192
Russia	86,143	82,883
Japan	84,535	85,304
Slovakia	83,055	80,468
Montenegro	82,463	70,604
Hungary	82,210	81,090
Estonia	81,783	82,326
Latvia	81,413	76,405
Panama	79,769	82,178
Kuwait	76,901	81,511
Kazakhstan	75,506	75,455
Oman	74,164	76,149
Bulgaria	73,323	72,731
Gabon	72,900	75,664
Trinidad and Tobago	69,901	73,392
Malaysia	68,973	67,366
Cyprus	68,656	71,753
Uruguay	67,011	65,245
Bahamas	67,010	62,187
Chile	65,021	63,967
North Macedonia	64,987	62,265
Costa Rica	63,701	61,869
Egypt	62,505	59,874
Algeria	61,394	58,849
Mauritius	61,187	59,326
Serbia	59,213	55,941
Argentina	59,088	61,532
Iraq	57,758	57,775
Turkmenistan	57,513	56,727
Iran	57,254	53,031
Belarus	56,968	53,201
Georgia	56,608	51,756
Dominican Republic	54,110	52,347
Bosnia and Herzegovina	53,407	52,616
Suriname	52,024	51,518
Botswana	50,517	56,448
Eswatini	50,289	38,516
Mexico	48,617	49,331
Maldives	47,805	45,641
Saint Lucia	47,776	49,145
Azerbaijan	47,519	41,324
South Africa	46,906	44,537
Armenia	46,539	42,560
China	45,494	42,071
Equatorial Guinea	44,380	49,110
St. Vincent and the Grenadines	44,063	43,986
Tunisia	43,859	42,618
Jordan	43,549	42,638
Mongolia	43,211	42,383
Libya	43,071	44,150
Brazil	42,229	41,026
Albania	41,779	41,102
Barbados	41,377	40,805
Sao Tome and Principe	41,226	19,404
Djibouti	40,676	38,353
Colombia	40,363	41,060
Ukraine	40,308	–
Thailand	38,616	37,470
Lebanon	38,140	–
Sri Lanka	37,329	35,298
Fiji	35,299	33,761
Paraguay	34,334	33,126
Namibia	34,071	33,682
Guatemala	31,412	31,155
Belize	31,347	29,225
Morocco	30,864	30,641
Mauritania	30,496	29,848
Ecuador	30,088	30,577
Peru	29,766	28,871
Indonesia	29,636	28,300
Bhutan	29,617	–
Moldova	29,395	27,675
Uzbekistan	28,469	26,952
Palestine	27,596	–
Samoa	27,514	20,866
El Salvador	26,337	26,071
Cape Verde	26,286	24,788
Vietnam	25,850	24,599
India	24,468	23,168
Philippines	24,097	23,549
Tonga	21,540	–
Tajikistan	20,501	18,323
Angola	20,381	20,267
Bangladesh	19,977	20,646
Nepal	19,867	18,915
Jamaica	19,505	19,636
Congo	19,016	19,199
Laos	18,894	21,018
Bolivia	18,384	20,687
Syria	18,226	–
Ghana	17,997	16,045
Honduras	17,668	16,022
Pakistan	17,577	17,373
Ivory Coast	17,472	17,566
Nicaragua	17,220	16,933
Kyrgyzstan	16,463	15,067
Sudan	15,277	11,028
Senegal	14,878	14,418
Kenya	14,613	13,055
Guinea	13,832	13,470
Cameroon	13,355	12,069
Myanmar	13,040	13,199
Papua New Guinea	12,777	13,712
Cambodia	12,521	12,659
Nigeria	11,988	16,772
Comoros	11,638	13,407
Gambia	11,424	8,479
Zambia	11,371	11,093
Afghanistan	10,784	11,224
Zimbabwe	9,827	9,792
Burkina Faso	9,792	6,969
East Timor	9,675	10,050
Sierra Leone	9,636	9,460
Somalia	9,593	9,542
Rwanda	9,326	9,547
Vanuatu	9,266	7,712
Benin	8,975	10,348
Lesotho	8,317	7,320
Togo	8,267	8,253
Chad	8,103	5,278
Mali	8,054	6,900
Tanzania	7,678	7,726
Haiti	7,350	7,748
Ethiopia	7,239	5,855
Guinea-Bissau	7,182	7,830
Uganda	6,505	7,328
Solomon Islands	4,823	4,866
Niger	4,586	4,397
DR Congo	4,468	4,299
Malawi	4,337	4,289
Liberia	3,676	3,609
Mozambique	3,538	3,594
Madagascar	3,306	3,251
Central African Republic	3,148	3,375
Burundi	1,940	1,942

=== By region ===
List of regions by GDP (constant 2021 PPP $) per person employed
Region	World Bank (2024) (Note: The following countries are from 2021–23 data: Afghanistan, Bhutan, Lebanon, Palestine, South Korea, Sudan, Syria, Tonga, Ukraine, and U.S. Virgin Islands.)	Our World In Data (2023)
North America	148,694	146,794
Euro Area	122,613	–
High income	119,252	116,761
European Union	117,342	117,238
OECD members	111,764	–
Europe and Central Asia	100,853	100,260
Central Europe and the Baltics	91,509	–
Caribbean small states	81,899	–
Arab World	71,780	–
Europe and Central Asia (excluding high income)	64,378	–
Other small states	63,865	–
Small states	62,287	–
Middle East, North Africa, Pakistan and Afghanistan	51,904	68,081
World	49,070	47,968
East Asia and Pacific	45,802	43,606
Upper middle income	45,477	43,139
Latin America and Caribbean	43,203	42,975
Latin America and Caribbean (excluding high income)	41,257	–
East Asia and Pacific (excluding high income)	40,382	–
Middle East, North Africa, Pakistan and Afghanistan (excluding high income)	38,523	–
Middle income	34,243	–
Low and middle income	32,591	–
South Asia	24,087	22,304
Lower middle income	22,178	21,952
Pacific Island small states	18,315	–
Sub-Saharan Africa (excluding high income)	12,007	–
Sub-Saharan Africa	11,483	11,772
Fragile and conflict affected situations	10,920	–
Least developed countries: UN classification	10,519	–
Heavily indebted poor countries	8,606	–
Low income	5,458	5,845

== Other sources ==
International Labour Organization (2022)

Country	GDP per person employed (2017 Intl. $)
Luxembourg	240,995
Ireland	222,016
Singapore	165,451
Switzerland	131,694
Brunei	130,083
Qatar	129,026
United States	128,502
Norway	128,094
Belgium	121,409
Hong Kong	119,401
Denmark	117,165
Saudi Arabia	114,215
Taiwan	113,209
Guyana	113,175
Austria	112,589
Sweden	109,773
Netherlands	109,558
Italy	108,800
France	108,711
United Arab Emirates	108,220
Puerto Rico	106,064
Finland	105,203
Germany	105,032
Israel	104,223
Australia	97,250
United Kingdom	95,456
Iceland	95,249
Canada	94,671
Spain	91,283
Turkey	90,493
Bahrain	89,953
Kuwait	89,351
Slovenia	87,147
Macao	86,333
Malta	85,967
Czech Republic	84,130
Korea, South	82,408
Greece	81,359
Lithuania	80,096
New Zealand	78,483
Japan	78,355
Estonia	77,076
Croatia	75,964
Romania	75,895
Portugal	74,360
Oman	73,877
Poland	70,523
Hungary	69,958
Panama	69,317
Latvia	68,505
Slovakia	63,343
Bahamas, The	61,716
Cyprus	60,547
Libya	59,319
Gabon	58,321
Chile	58,071
Kazakhstan	56,057
Malaysia	55,933
Montenegro	55,915
Trinidad and Tobago	54,998
Iran	53,682
Bulgaria	53,527
Argentina	52,012
Uruguay	50,804
Costa Rica	50,550
Turkmenistan	48,758
Equatorial Guinea	47,800
South Africa	47,201
Egypt	46,402
Mauritius	46,067
Algeria	45,619
Iraq	44,952
Bosnia and Herzegovina	44,701
Dominican Republic	44,460
Serbia	44,324
Botswana	43,771
Mexico	43,515
North Macedonia	42,984
Jordan	41,972
Maldives	41,398
Suriname	39,578
Cuba	38,309
Georgia	37,499
Lebanon	37,085
Tunisia	36,139
Swaziland	36,071
Belarus	35,774
Saint Vincent and the Grenadines	35,248
Colombia	35,200
Armenia	34,869
China	34,164
Albania	34,018
Moldova	33,726
Brazil	32,761
Barbados	32,613
Sri Lanka	32,455
Mongolia	32,012
Djibouti	31,871
Thailand	31,523
Namibia	31,199
Azerbaijan	30,582
Saint Lucia	30,394
Fiji	29,985
Paraguay	28,830
Palestine	27,145
Indonesia	25,829
Venezuela	25,687
Mauritania	25,424
Morocco	25,163
Peru	24,801
Bhutan	24,461
Ecuador	22,903
Guatemala	22,857
Uzbekistan	22,163
El Salvador	21,997
Philippines	21,364
India	20,422
Vietnam	20,128
Laos	19,623
Jamaica	18,871
Bolivia	18,016
Cape Verde	17,606
Tonga	17,589
Pakistan	17,310
Belize	16,912
Samoa	16,679
Tajikistan	16,669
Sudan	15,724
Nigeria	15,695
Nepal	15,512
Angola	15,456
Bangladesh	15,130
Côte d'Ivoire	14,689
São Tomé and Príncipe	14,625
Yemen	13,928
Honduras	13,825
Kyrgyzstan	13,550
Ghana	13,234
Nicaragua	13,190
Comoros	13,084
Papua New Guinea	12,511
Senegal	12,307
Kenya	11,219
Congo, Republic of the	10,544
Zambia	9,958
Benin	9,644
Cameroon	9,429
Guinea	9,334
Syria	8,960
Cambodia	8,443
Timor-Leste	8,062
Rwanda	7,889
Somalia	7,593
Haiti	7,386
South Sudan	7,322
Lesotho	6,890
Vanuatu	6,740
Togo	6,547
Gambia	6,383
Burkina Faso	6,293
Uganda	6,094
Mali	6,082
Guinea-Bissau	6,059
Zimbabwe	6,013
Tanzania	5,777
Sierra Leone	5,160
Ethiopia	5,057
Chad	4,611
Solomon Islands	4,519
Eritrea	4,279
Malawi	3,987
Korea, North	3,925
Liberia	3,294
Congo, Democratic Republic of the	3,279
Niger	3,266
Mozambique	2,907
Madagascar	2,905
Central African Republic	2,429
Burundi	1,678

CIA World Factbook (2011)

Country	GDP per person employed (current Intl. $)	GDP per capita (current Intl. $)	Employed / total pop. (%)
Luxembourg	223,300	86,500	39
Qatar	138,200	98,300	71
United States	107,900	48,400	45
Norway	104,600	56,400	54
Austria	101,400	42,800	42
Ireland	99,800	38,900	39
Singapore	99,800	59,900	60
Saudi Arabia	99,500	25,900	26
Hong Kong	98,000	49,200	50
Netherlands	95,600	42,400	44
Belgium	88,000	39,500	45
Taiwan	82,900	38,400	46
France	82,400	34,000	41
Switzerland	82,300	44,600	54
Sweden	81,900	41,700	51
Australia	80,400	42,200	52
Canada	80,300	40,800	51
Italy	79,600	29,900	38
Finland	79,500	37,400	47
Israel	77,200	31,500	41
Denmark	77,100	37,400	49
Spain	77,000	30,200	39
United Kingdom	76,900	35,900	47
Germany	75,100	37,900	50
Greece	74,700	28,700	38
Iceland	74,700	39,600	53
European Union	74,400	30,600	41
Slovenia	69,900	29,300	42
Korea, South	63,900	31,800	50
Cyprus	60,900	21,200	35
Croatia	57,200	18,000	32
Czech Republic	56,500	26,700	47
New Zealand	56,000	28,700	51
Slovakia	54,100	23,200	43
Hungary	51,300	19,600	38
Portugal	51,000	22,900	45
Poland	48,500	19,900	41
Argentina	45,600	17,000	37
Estonia	44,800	21,100	47
Lithuania	44,700	17,300	39
Bulgaria	43,800	14,300	33
Trinidad and Tobago	43,800	21,300	49
Turkey	41,700	13,000	31
Iran	41,600	11,900	29
South Africa	41,200	11,300	27
Malaysia	38,800	15,600	40
Chile	37,500	16,600	44
Mexico	36,600	14,600	40
Mauritius	34,400	14,800	43
Latvia	34,000	15,700	46
Uruguay	33,900	15,700	46
Russia	33,900	17,200	51
Panama	33,500	14,500	43
North Macedonia	32,000	10,300	32
Montenegro	31,300	10,500	34
Tunisia	31,000	9,600	31
Romania	30,700	12,000	39
Peru	29,800	10,200	34
Kosovo	29,400	7,000	24
Ecuador	28,900	8,300	29
Costa Rica	27,200	11,900	44
Algeria	26,300	7,500	29
Kazakhstan	26,200	12,500	48
Colombia	26,000	10,500	40
Jordan	23,700	5,700	24
Brazil	23,300	11,200	48
Dominican Republic	22,700	9,400	41
Jamaica	21,300	8,600	40
Egypt	21,200	6,300	30
Syria	20,800	4,800	23
El Salvador	18,700	7,400	39
Ukraine	16,200	7,300	45
Armenia	16,000	6,000	38
Morocco	15,500	5,100	33
Azerbaijan	15,400	9,900	64
Thailand	15,300	9,000	59
China	14,800	8,400	57
Sri Lanka	14,600	5,500	37
Guatemala	14,000	5,400	39
Paraguay	12,600	5,600	45
Bolivia	11,800	5,100	43
Honduras	10,800	4,400	40
Philippines	10,600	3,800	36
Indonesia	10,300	4,600	44
Nigeria	10,200	2,500	25
India	10,100	3,800	37
Pakistan	8,900	2,600	29
Nicaragua	7,000	3,300	47
Vietnam	6,600	3,300	50
Uzbekistan	5,800	3,300	57
Bangladesh	3,900	1,800	45
Burma	2,700	1,500	57

== See also ==
- Workforce
- Unemployment rate
- Structural unemployment
- List of countries by unemployment rate
- List of countries by GDP (real) per capita growth rate
- List of countries by GDP sector composition
- List of countries by GDP (PPP) per capita
- List of countries by GDP (nominal) per capita
- List of countries by past and projected GDP (PPP) per capita
- List of regions by past GDP (PPP) per capita
- List of countries by average wage
