= Pigeon Island (Grenadines) =

Island in Saint Vincent and the Grenadines

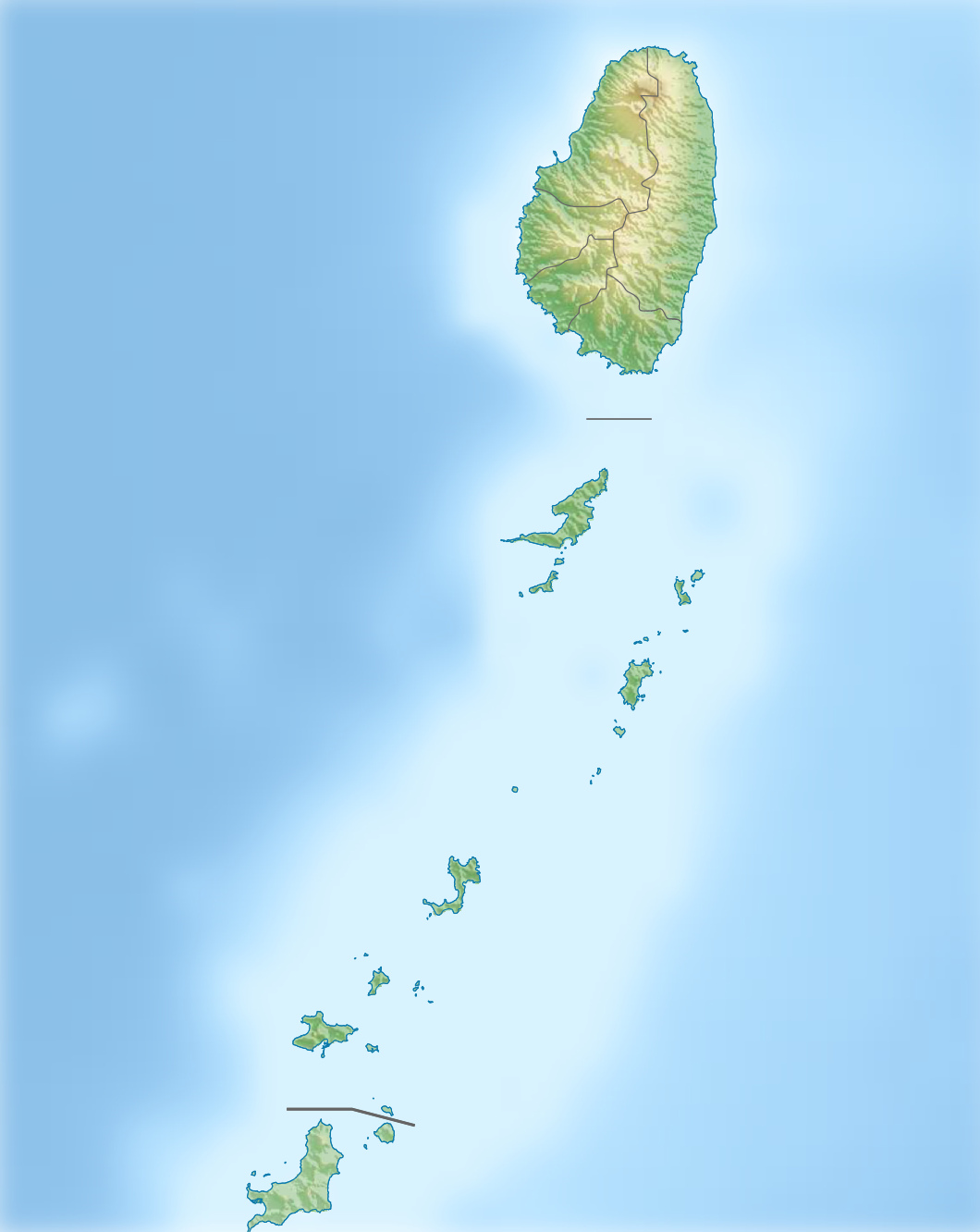
- Location within Saint Vincent and the Grenadines Location within Lesser Antilles Location within the Caribbean

Geography
- Location: Caribbean
- Coordinates: 12°56′50″N 61°16′29″W

Administration
- Saint Vincent and the Grenadines

Additional information
- Time zone: AST (UTC-4)
Pigeon Island Wildlife Reserve
- IUCN category IV (habitat/species management area)
- Interactive map of Pigeon Island Wildlife Reserve
- Area: 8.9 km^{2} (3.4 sq mi)
- Established: 1987
- Website: Pigeon Island in Saint Vincent and the Grenadines

Pigeon Island is one of the Grenadines uninhabited islands of Lesser Antilles in the Caribbean, part of the nation of Saint Vincent and the Grenadines. It is about 400 meters southwest of the larger Isle à Quatre. In 1987, it received the status of the Pigeon Island Wildlife Reserve.
