= Saint Elairs Cay =

Island in Saint Vincent and the Grenadines

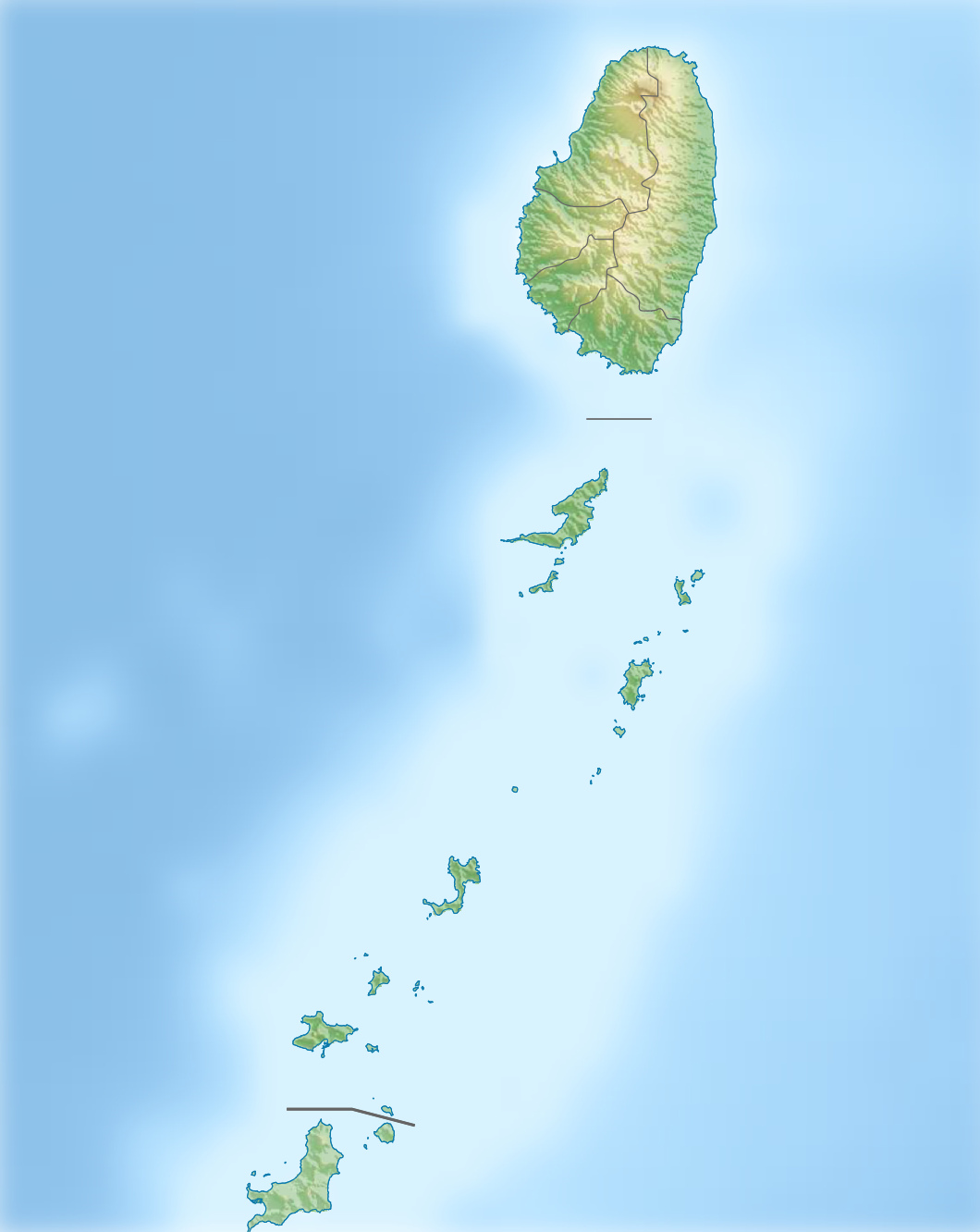
- Location within Saint Vincent and the Grenadines Location within Lesser Antilles Location within the Caribbean

Geography
- Location: Caribbean
- Coordinates: 12.98051°N 61.23116°W
- Archipelago: Grenadines

Administration
- Saint Vincent and the Grenadines

Saint Elairs Cay is a small uninhabited island in the Grenadines. It belongs to the island State of Saint Vincent and the Grenadines and lies between the islands of Bequia and Petit Nevis.
