= Girl Guides Association of Saint Vincent and the Grenadines =

- Girl Guides Association of Saint Vincent and the Grenadines
- Country: Saint Vincent and the Grenadines
- Founded: 1914
- Membership: 1,162
- Affiliation: World Association of Girl Guides and Girl Scouts

The Girl Guides Association of Saint Vincent and the Grenadines is the national Guiding organization of Saint Vincent and the Grenadines. It serves 1,162 members (as of 2003). Founded in 1914, the girls-only organization became a full member of the World Association of Girl Guides and Girl Scouts in 1984.

The chief commissioner of the Association is Laura Browne and Jeanette France is responsible for training leaders.

In St. Vincent, Guiding is dividing into four groups:

- Bim Bims (5-7) Grade K to Grade 2,
- Brownies (8-11) Grade 3 to Grade 6,
- Guides (12-15) Form 1 to Form 4,
- Rangers (16-18) Form 5 to 2nd year of college,

(Grading is in co-ordinance to the school system of the country)

== See also ==
- The Scout Association of Saint Vincent and the Grenadines
