= Dove Cay =

Island in the Bahamas

Coordinates: 23°33′26″N 75°19′45″W

Dove Cay is an island in the Bahamas. It is located in the vicinity of Long Island, Bahamas. It is 1.07 kilometres (0.66 mi) long.
