= List of diplomatic missions in Saint Vincent and the Grenadines =

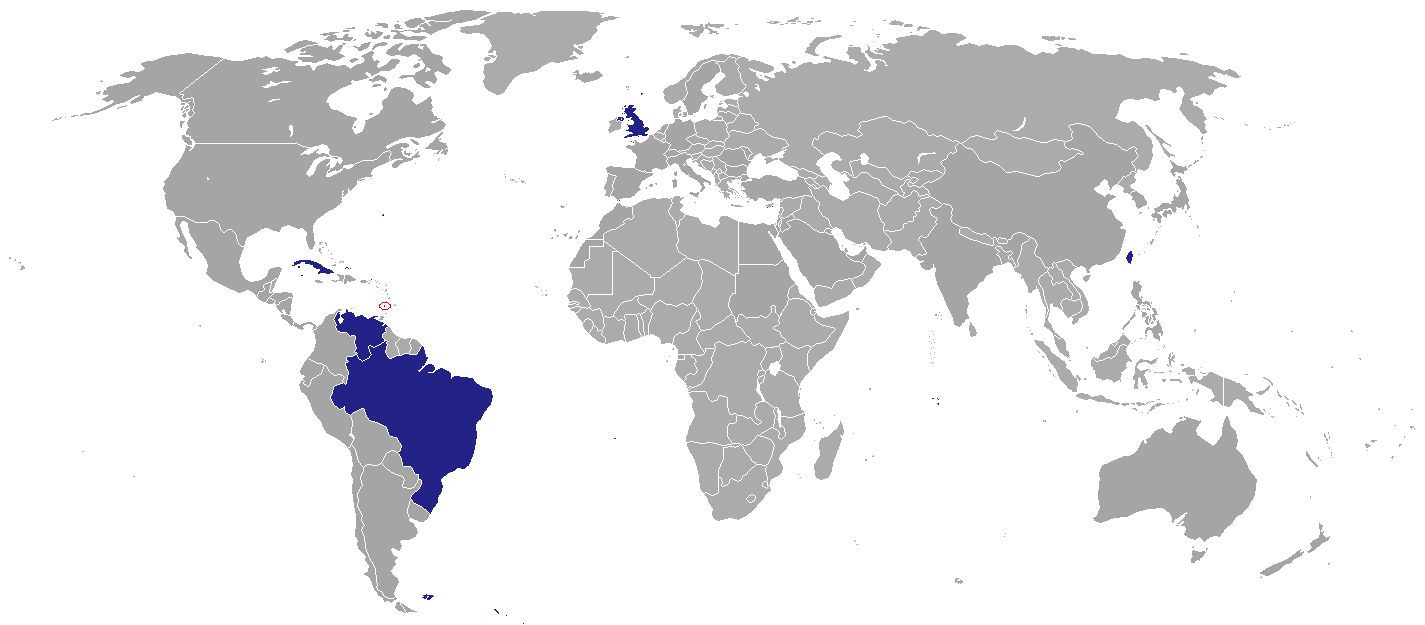
Diplomatic missions in Saint Vincent and the Grenadines

At present, Saint Vincent and the Grenadines' capital city of Kingstown hosts 6 embassies/high commissions. Several other countries have honorary consuls to provide emergency services to their citizens.

== Embassies/High Commissions ==
Kingstown

1. Brazil
2. Republic of China (Taiwan)
3. Cuba
4. SMOM
5. United Kingdom
6. Venezuela

== Non-resident embassies/high commissions ==
- Algeria (Caracas)
- Argentina (Port of Spain)
- Australia (Port of Spain)
- Austria (Bogotá)
- Belgium (Kingston)
- Canada (Bridgetown)
- Chile (Kingston)
- Colombia (Port of Spain)
- Czech Republic (Mexico City)
- Denmark (Mexico City)
- Egypt (Caracas)
- Ethiopia (Havana)
- Eswatini (New York City)
- European Union (Bridgetown)
- Finland (Caracas)
- France (Castries)
- Germany (Port of Spain)
- Ghana (Havana)
- Guinea (New York City)
- Guatemala (Port-of-Spain)
- Haiti (Santo Domingo)
- Iceland (New York City)
- Indonesia (Caracas)
- Ireland (Brasilia)
- Israel (Santo Domingo)
- Italy (Caracas)
- Ivory Coast (Mexico City)
- Japan (Port of Spain)
- Jordan (Washington, D.C.)
- Kenya (Havana)
- Kuwait (Caracas)
- Libya (Castries)
- Lesotho (Washington, D.C.)
- Lebanon (Havana)
- Laos (Havana)
- Liberia (Washington, D.C.)
- Mali (Havana)
- Malaysia (Caracas)
- Mexico (Castries)
- Maldives (New York City)
- Morocco (Castries)
- Norway (Caracas)
- Netherlands (Port of Spain)
- Nicaragua (Port of Spain)
- Oman (New York City)
- Portugal (Caracas)
- Philippines (Washington, D.C.)
- Palestine (Caracas)
- Poland (Caracas)
- Russia (Georgetown)
- Saudi Arabia (Caracas)
- Serbia (Washington, D.C.)
- Slovakia (Havana)
- Seychelles (New York City)
- Sierra Leone (New York City)
- South Africa (Kingston)
- Republic of Korea (Port of Spain)
- Spain (Port of Spain)
- Switzerland (Caracas)
- Sweden (Stockholm)
- Senegal (Havana)
- Sudan (Washington, D.C.)
- Somalia (Washington, D.C.)
- South Sudan (Washington, D.C.)
- Thailand (Ottawa)
- Togo (New York City)
- Turkmenistan (Washington, D.C.)
- Tunisia (New York City)
- Turkey (Port of Spain)
- Tajikistan (Washington, D.C.)
- United Arab Emirates (Bogota)
- United States (Bridgetown)
- Uganda (New York City)
- Vanuatu (New York City)
- Vietnam (Caracas)
- Yemen (Havana)
- Zimbabwe (Ottawa)
- Zambia (Washington, D.C.)

== See also ==
- Foreign relations of Saint Vincent and the Grenadines
- List of diplomatic missions of Saint Vincent and the Grenadines
