= Flag of Saint Vincent and the Grenadines =

Saint Vincent and the Grenadines
- The Gems
- Use: National flag and ensign
- Proportion: 2:3
- Adopted: 12 October 1985; 41 years ago
- Design: A Canadian pale triband of blue, gold, and green, with three green diamonds in the middle arranged to form the letter "V".
- Designed by: Julien van der Wal

The flag of Saint Vincent and the Grenadines is a Canadian pale triband consisting of blue, gold, and green bands charged with three green diamonds at the middle. Adopted in 1985 to replace a similar design used from the time of independence, it has been the flag of Saint Vincent since that year. The design of the present flag entailed substituting the country's coat of arms on a breadfruit leaf with the diamonds. They are a reference to both the letter "V", which is the first letter of the country's name, and its nickname as the "Gems of the Antilles" and "Jewels of the Caribbean". Accordingly, the flag itself has been given the moniker of "The Gems".

== History ==
Sovereignty over Saint Vincent switched hands between the French and the British throughout the 18th century. This continued until 1783, when the Peace of Paris saw France permanently relinquish the island to the United Kingdom, and Saint Vincent eventually became a crown colony within the latter's colonial empire. During this period, it utilised a British Blue Ensign defaced with the territory's coat of arms as its flag. The shield initially consisted of two brunette raven-haired ladies, one clutching a palm branch on the left and one with clasped hands kneeling before an altar on the right. This design was revised in 1907, with the women's hair colour changed to blond and the clasped hands becoming an eye. The island subsequently joined the West Indies Federation in 1958 and remained part of this political union until 1962. On 27 October 1969, seven years after the federation was dissolved, Saint Vincent became an Associated State, and adopted the aforementioned blue ensign as its official flag.

When Saint Vincent became an independent country on 27 October 1979, a flag designed by native Saint Vincentian Elaine Liverpool was chosen to be the national flag. This consisted of a triband of blue, gold, and green separated by two thin white fimbriations, and the centre band charged with the country's coat of arms on a breadfruit leaf, which had been introduced to the island by William Bligh. However, this design soon proved to be convoluted and costly to manufacture, with the breadfruit leaf hard to recognise from afar. After the New Democratic Party emerged victorious in the 1984 elections, new prime minister James Fitz-Allen Mitchell sought to have the flag redesigned. A nationwide contest was held, but it resulted in an impasse after no entry was deemed suitable. Consequently, Julien van der Wal – a graphic artist from Switzerland who also designed the flag of the Canton of Geneva and pictograms for the Olympic Games – was tasked with modifying the flag. He was instructed to "modernise the original flag, keeping the same colours and respecting the symbolism". In the meantime, the white fimbriations were removed from the soon-to-be disused design in March 1985.

Van der Wal's design saw the arms and breadfruit leaf substituted for three diamonds grouped together in a "V" shape. Notwithstanding these changes, the meaning behind the colours remained the same. The new flag was formally adopted by the government on 12 October 1985. There is some discrepancy over when it was first hoisted officially. The islands' national newspaper, The Vincentian, maintains this took place during a ceremony at the War Memorial in the capital Kingstown on 21 October. On the other hand, Whitney Smith in the Encyclopædia Britannica states that it was first raised one day later (22 October). The flag – which has been occasionally dubbed "The Gems" – is utilised "for all purposes", with no distinction made between civil, state, and naval ensigns.

== Design ==
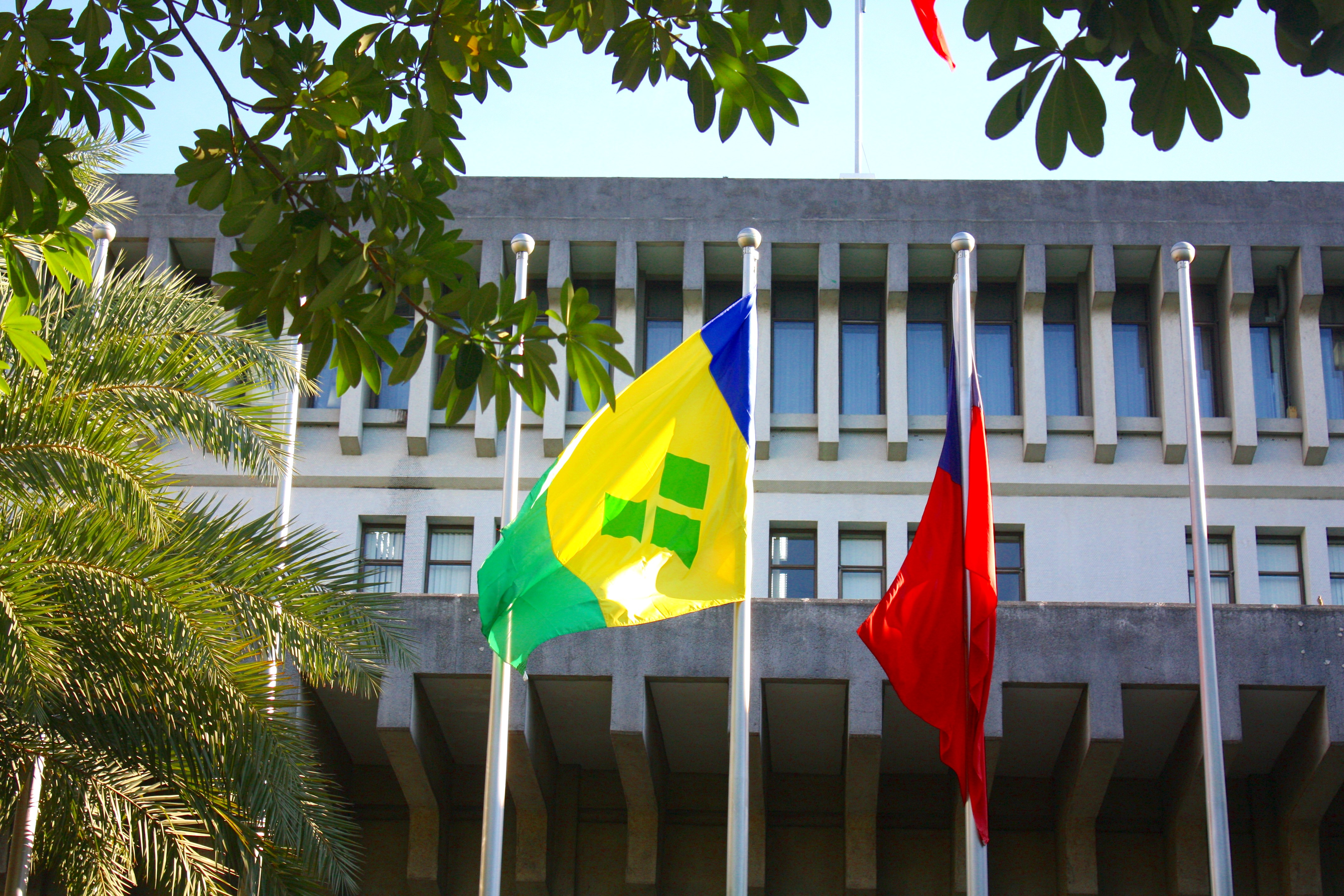
The Saint Vincentian flag flying outside the Taiwanese Ministry of Foreign Affairs in Taipei.

=== Symbolism ===
The colours and symbols of the flag carry cultural, political, and regional meanings. The blue epitomises the sky and the sea, while the gold represents the colour of the islands' sand, the sunshine, and the "bright spirit" of the islanders. The green symbolises the country's plentiful vegetation, as well as the vitality of Vincentians. The three diamonds evoke the nicknames of Saint Vincent as the "Gems of the Antilles" and the "Jewels of the Caribbean". Their arrangement in the shape of the letter V is a subtle allusion to the first letter in "Vincent", while its placement on the marginally lower part of the centre band indicates the geographical positioning of the islands within the Antilles.

== Legal issues ==
The Saint Vincentian flag is utilised as a flag of convenience by foreign merchant vessels. The government permits this in order to increase revenue for the country, and it offers many advantages for these ships, such as less expensive fees and lax rules regarding crew, safety, and the environment. However, the lack of regulation on such vessels has led to concerns over illegal and suspicious activity like money laundering. Two ships flying the flag of Saint Vincent were found by the European Commission (EC) to have been on the blacklist of the Regional Fisheries Management Organisations.

As a result, this practice has attracted criticism from opposition parties as well as international organisations, most notably the EC. The EC identified Saint Vincent and the Grenadines as a non-cooperating country in fighting illegal, unreported and unregulated fishing (IUU) on May 23, 2020, having warned them earlier through pre-identification in December 2014. By listing the country as non-cooperating, it meant that all fisheries products from Saint Vincent could no longer be legally imported into the European Union. This has negligible impact on the country, because Saint Vincent does not export fisheries products to EU member states.

== Historical flags ==
Historical flags of Saint Vincent and the Grenadines
Historical flag	Duration	Description
	1877–1907	A Blue Ensign defaced with the badge of British Saint Vincent and the Grenadines.
	1907–1979	A Blue Ensign defaced with the badge of British Saint Vincent and the Grenadines.
	1979–1985	A vertical tricolour of blue, gold, and green bands separated by two thin white fimbriations, and the middle band charged with the country's coat of arms on a breadfruit leaf.
	1985 (March to October)	A vertical tricolour of blue, gold, and green bands, and the middle band charged with country's coat of arms on a breadfruit leaf.

== See also ==
- Coat of arms of Saint Vincent and the Grenadines
