= List of diplomatic missions of Saint Vincent and the Grenadines =

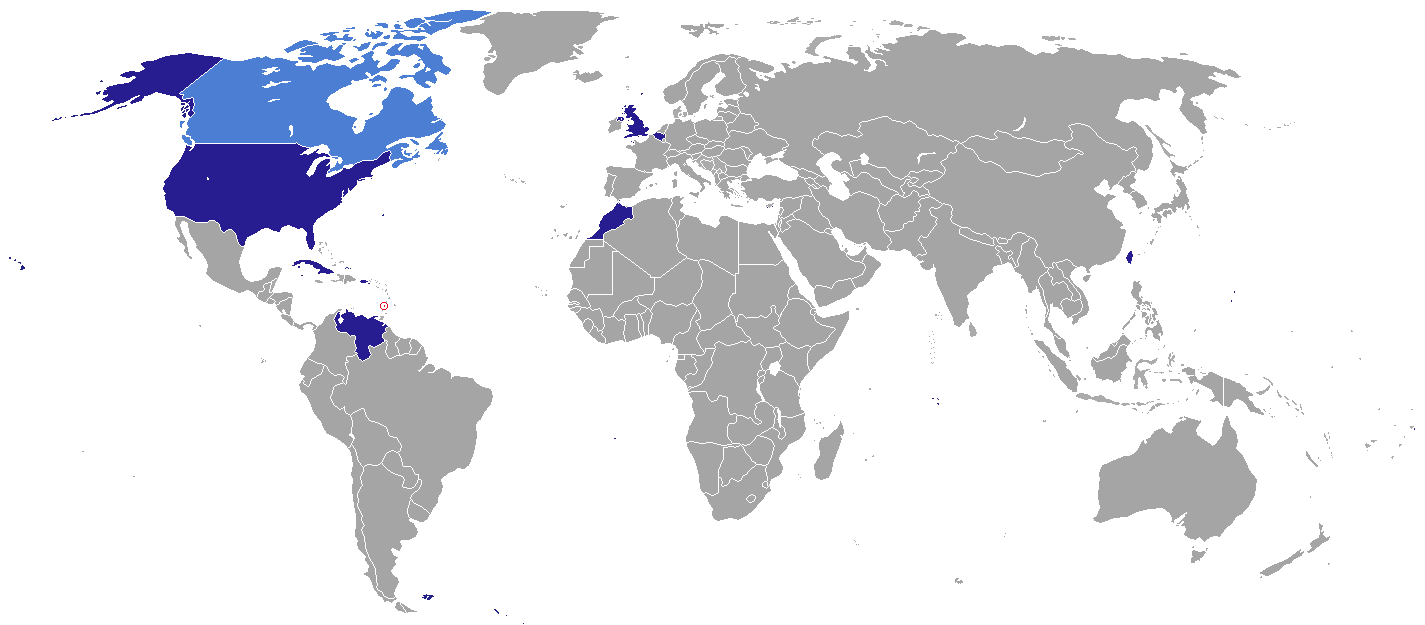
Diplomatic missions of Saint Vincent and the Grenadines

This is a list of diplomatic missions of Saint Vincent and the Grenadines. Saint Vincent and the Grenadines' diplomatic network does not extend to any neighbouring Caribbean countries. The country also has tourism representatives and honorary consulate in other countries (not listed below). Its embassy and mission to the European Union in Brussels and its embassy in Morocco is shared with other East Caribbean states.

== Current missions ==
=== Africa ===
Host country	Host city	Mission	Concurrent accreditation	Ref.
Morocco	Rabat	Embassy		

=== Americas ===
Host country	Host city	Mission	Concurrent accreditation	Ref.
Canada	Toronto	Consulate-General		
Cuba	Havana	Embassy		
United States	Washington, D.C.	Embassy	Country: Canada; International Organizations: Organization of American States	
United States	New York City	Consulate-General	Country: Canada; International Organizations: Organization of American States	
Venezuela	Caracas	Embassy		

=== Asia ===
Host country	Host city	Mission	Concurrent accreditation	Ref.
Republic of China (Taiwan)	Taipei	Embassy		

=== Europe ===
Host country	Host city	Mission	Concurrent accreditation	Ref.
Belgium	Brussels	Embassy	International Organizations: European Union	
United Kingdom	London	High Commission		
United Kingdom	Comber	Consulate-General		

=== Multilateral organizations ===
Organization	Host city	Host country	Mission	Concurrent accreditation	Ref.
United Nations	New York City	United States	Permanent Mission	Country: Guatemala	
UNESCO	Paris	France	Permanent Mission	Country: Holy See	

== Gallery ==
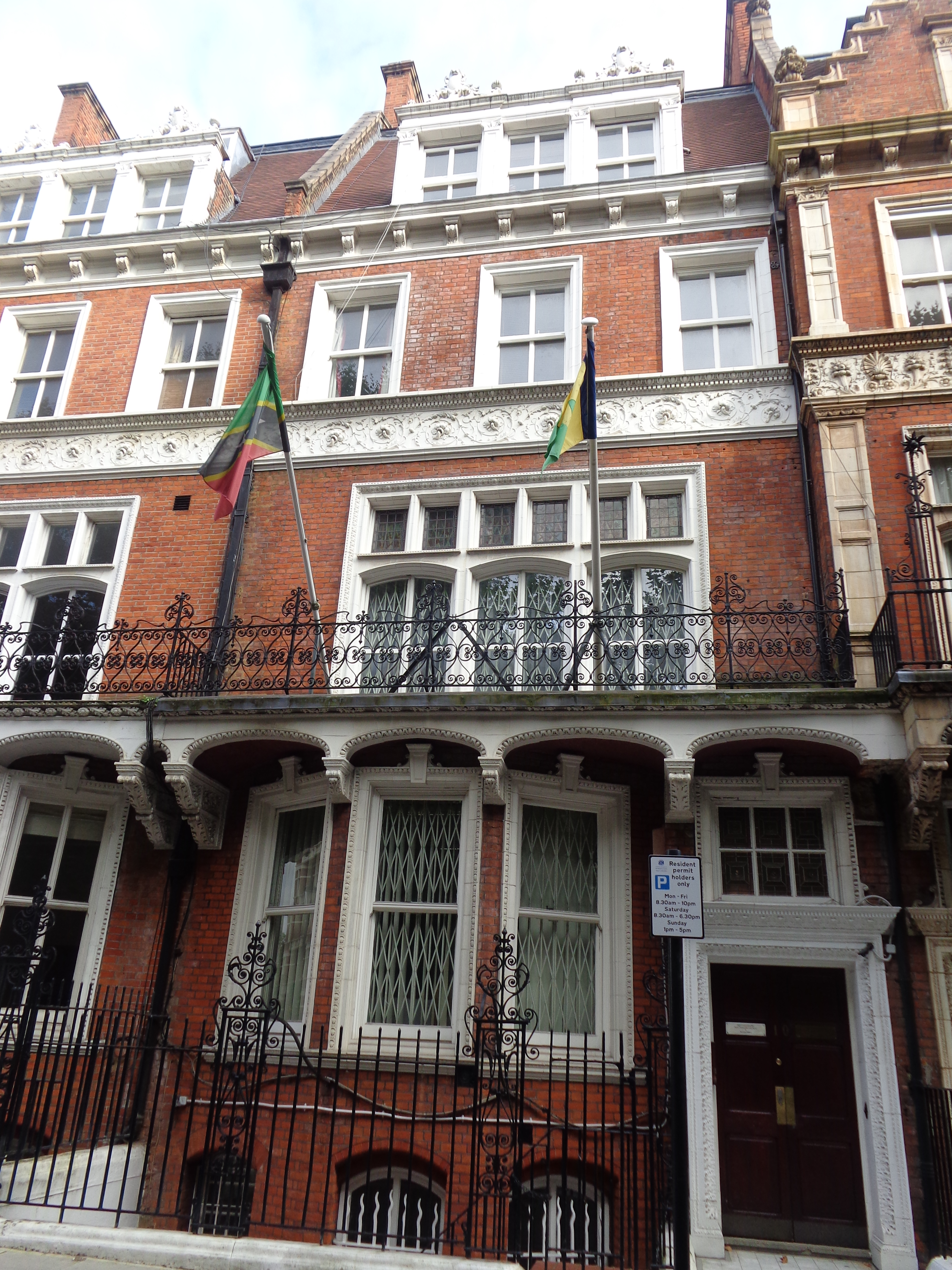
High Commission in London

== See also ==
- Foreign relations of Saint Vincent and the Grenadines
- List of diplomatic missions in Saint Vincent and the Grenadines
