= Telecommunications in Saint Vincent and the Grenadines =

Telecommunications in Saint Vincent and the Grenadines is accomplished through the transmission of information by various types of technologies within Saint Vincent and the Grenadines, mainly telephones, radio, television, and the Internet.

== Telephone ==
Telephones - main lines in use: 12,483 (2020)

Telephones - mobile cellular: 102,700 (2019)

Telephone system:

domestic: fixed-line teledensity exceeds 11 per 100 persons and mobile-cellular teledensity is about 87 per 100 persons
international: landing points for the ECFS, CARCIP and Southern Caribbean Fiber submarine cables providing connectivity to US and Caribbean Islands; connectivity also provided by VHF/UHF radiotelephone from Saint Vincent to Barbados; SHF radiotelephone to Grenada and Saint Lucia; access to Intelsat earth station in Martinique through Saint Lucia

== Radio ==
Radio broadcast stations: AM 0 (ZBG-AM 700 went off air in 2010), FM 3, shortwave 0 (1998)

Radios: 77,000 (1997)

== Television ==
Television broadcast stations: 1 (plus five repeaters) (2020)

Televisions: 18,000 (1997)

== Internet ==
Internet Service Providers (ISPs): Cable and Wireless/FLOW

Country code (Top level domain): VC

== See also ==
- History of telecommunication
- Outline of telecommunication
