= Coat of arms of Saint Vincent and the Grenadines =

Versions
- Greater coat of arms

- Version used by the Government
- Armiger: Saint Vincent and the Grenadines
- Adopted: 1979
- Crest: Cotton plant
- Torse: Blue, Gold and Green
- Shield: Argent a base vert features two women in classical Roman dress:the one on the heraldic right stands holding an olive branch, and the one on the left holds scales of justice and kneels before a gold altar situated between them
- Motto: Pax et Justitia "Peace and Justice"
- Earlier version(s)

The coat of arms or national seal of Saint Vincent and the Grenadines is surmounted by a cotton plant and bears the text "Peace and Justice" in Latin. The centerpiece is based on the colonial badge in use from 1907 to 1979 and features two women in classical Roman dress. The one on the heraldic right stands holding an olive branch and the one on the left holds scales of justice and kneels before a gold altar situated between them. The coat of arms was designed by Elaine Liverpool.
