= 2026 in Saint Vincent and the Grenadines =

- Decades: 2000s; 2010s; 2020s
- See also: Other events of 2026; Timeline of Vincentian history

Events in the year 2026 in Saint Vincent and the Grenadines.

== Incumbents ==
- Monarch: Charles III
- Governor General: Susan Dougan (until 5 January); Stanley John since 6 January
- Prime Minister: Godwin Friday

== Events ==
- 13 February – The United States carries out an attack on a boat suspected of transporting drugs in Saint Vincentian waters, killing three people.

== Holidays ==
- 1 January – New Year's Day
- 14 March – National Heroes' Day, honoring Chief Joseph Chatoyer
- 3 April – Good Friday
- 6 April – Easter Monday
- 1 May – Labour Day
- 25 May – Whit Monday
- 6–7 July – Carnival
- 1 August – Emancipation Day
- 27 October – Independence Day
- 25 December – Christmas Day
- 26 December – Boxing Day

== Deaths ==
- 27 September – Robert Rivas, 80, Trinidadian-born Roman Catholic prelate, bishop of Kingstown (1989–2007)
