= 2020 in Saint Vincent and the Grenadines =

- Decades: 2000s; 2010s; 2020s
- See also: Other events of 2020; Timeline of Vincentian history

Events in the year 2020 in Saint Vincent and the Grenadines.

== Incumbents ==
- Monarch: Elizabeth II
- Governor General: Susan Dougan
- Prime Minister: Ralph Gonsalves

== Events ==
Ongoing — COVID-19 pandemic in Saint Vincent and the Grenadines

- 11 March – Saint Vincent and the Grenadines confirmed its first case of COVID-19.
- 5 November – 2020 Vincentian general election: The result was a victory for the Unity Labour Party, its fifth in a row; the party won nine of the fifteen seats, gaining one seat.

== Sports ==
- 2019–20 SVGFF Premier Division

== Deaths ==
- 23 January – Sir Frederick Ballantyne, 83, Vincentian cardiologist, Governor-General (2002–2019).
