= 2022 in Saint Vincent and the Grenadines =

- Decades: 2000s; 2010s; 2020s
- See also: Other events of 2022; Timeline of Vincentian history

Events in the year 2022 in Saint Vincent and the Grenadines.

== Incumbents ==
- Monarch: Elizabeth II (until 8 September); then Charles III
- Governor General: Susan Dougan
- Prime Minister: Ralph Gonsalves

== Events ==
Ongoing — COVID-19 pandemic in Saint Vincent and the Grenadines

- 8 September – Accession of Charles III as King of Saint Vincent and the Grenadines following the death of Queen Elizabeth II.
- 19 September – Governor-General Dame Susan Dougan attends the state funeral of Queen Elizabeth II in the United Kingdom.

== Deaths ==
- 21 August – Irvin Warrican, 56, Vincentian cricketer (Windward Islands) (born 1965)
- 8 September – Elizabeth II, 96, Queen of Saint Vincent and the Grenadines (born 1926)
