= 2021 in Saint Vincent and the Grenadines =

- Decades: 2000s; 2010s; 2020s
- See also: Other events of 2021; Timeline of Vincentian history

Events in the year 2021 in Saint Vincent and the Grenadines.

== Incumbents ==
- Monarch: Elizabeth II
- Governor General: Susan Dougan
- Prime Minister: Ralph Gonsalves

== Events ==
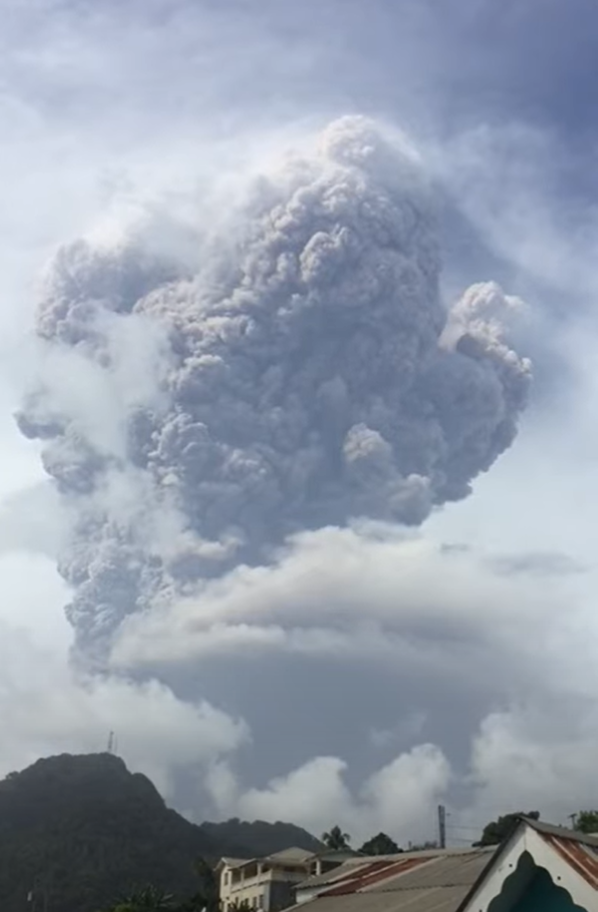
Second eruption of La Soufrière, on 9 April 2021

Ongoing — COVID-19 pandemic in Saint Vincent and the Grenadines

- 9 April – An explosive eruption of the volcano La Soufrière is forcing the evacuation of thousands of people.

== Deaths ==
- 21 May – Dwayne Sandy, footballer (born 1989).
