= 2015 in Saint Vincent and the Grenadines =

- Decades: 1990s; 2000s; 2010s; 2020s
- See also: Other events of 2015; Timeline of Vincentian history

The following lists events that happened during 2015 in Saint Vincent and the Grenadines.

== Incumbents ==
- Monarch: Elizabeth II
- Governor General: Frederick Ballantyne
- Prime Minister: Ralph Gonsalves

== Events ==
=== January ===
- January 12 - A school bus plunges off of a cliff on St. Vincent leaving at least five people dead and two missing.
