= 2024 in Saint Vincent and the Grenadines =

- Decades: 2000s; 2010s; 2020s
- See also: Other events of 2024; Timeline of Vincentian history

Events in the year 2024 in Saint Vincent and the Grenadines.

== Incumbents ==
- Monarch: Charles III
- Governor General: Susan Dougan
- Prime Minister: Ralph Gonsalves

== Events ==
- January 4 – A private plane enroute from J.F. Mitchell Airport in Saint Vincent and the Grenadines to Hewanorra International Airport in Saint Lucia crashes shortly after takeoff, killing four people including the pilot.
- July 1 – One person is killed in Bequia during the onslaught of Hurricane Beryl.

== Holidays ==
- 1 January – New Year's Day
- 14 March – National Heroes' Day, honors Chief Joseph Chatoyer
- 29 March – Good Friday
- 1 April – Easter Monday
- 1 May – Labour Day
- 20 May – Whit Monday
- 1–2 July – Carnival
- 1 August – Emancipation Day
- 27 October – Independence Day
- 25 December – Christmas Day
- 26 December – Boxing Day
