= 2025 in Saint Vincent and the Grenadines =

- Decades: 2000s; 2010s; 2020s
- See also: Other events of 2025; Timeline of Vincentian history

Events in the year 2025 in Saint Vincent and the Grenadines.

== Incumbents ==
- Monarch: Charles III
- Governor General: Susan Dougan
- Prime Minister: Ralph Gonsalves (until 28 November); then Godwin Friday

== Events ==
- April 10 – The Government Secures US$20 million from the World Bank’s Board of Executive Directors to Strengthen Disaster Resilience.
- 26 May – The bodies of 11 people and Malian passports are found in an abandoned boat along the coast of Canouan.
- 1 October – An agreement allowing absolute freedom of movement for nationals of Barbados, Belize, Dominica and Saint Vincent and the Grenadines travelling between their countries comes into effect.
- 27 November – 2025 Vincentian general election: The opposition New Democratic Party led by Godwin Friday wins 14 of 15 seats in the House of Assembly.

== Holidays ==
- 1 January – New Year's Day
- 14 March – National Heroes' Day, honors Chief Joseph Chatoyer
- 18 April – Good Friday
- 21 April – Easter Monday
- 1 May – Labour Day
- 9 June – Whit Monday
- 7–8 July – Carnival
- 1 August – Emancipation Day
- 27 October – Independence Day
- 25 December – Christmas Day
- 26 December – Boxing Day
