= Henry Harvey Williams =

Henry Harvey Williams OBE

Governor-General of Saint Vincent and the Grenadines Acting
- In office 29 February 1988 – 20 September 1989
- Monarch: Elizabeth II
- Prime Minister: James Fitz-Allen Mitchell
- Preceded by: Joseph Lambert Eustace
- Succeeded by: David Emmanuel Jack

Personal details
- Born: 6 January 1917 Gomea, Saint Vincent, British Windward Islands
- Died: 11 November 2004 (aged 87)
- Education: University College of West Indies

Henry Harvey Williams, OBE (6 January 1917 – 11 November 2004) was a lawyer and civil servant who served as the acting Governor-General of Saint Vincent and the Grenadines between 1988 and 1989.

Williams was born in the village of Gomea, in Saint Vincent's Saint George Parish, and attended Saint Vincent Grammar School. He studied law at the University of the West Indies, and briefly worked as a teacher before entering the British Windward Islands civil service. In 1956, he was appointed District Officer in charge of Carriacou (now part of Grenada, but then administered separately). Two years later, Williams was appointed secretary to the government of Grenada, serving in that role for four years. He was eventually appointed Chief Secretary of his home country, Saint Vincent, and in that capacity sometimes acted in the position of administrator (in the absence of the official administrator). In 1970, Williams was created an Officer of the Order of the British Empire (postnominals OBE), for services rendered to Saint Vincent. Outside of his work as a civil servant, he also served as chairman of the National Independence Committee, and was a supporter of Caribbean unification.

In February 1988, on the advice of the Prime Minister of Saint Vincent, James Fitz-Allen Mitchell, Williams was appointed acting governor-general of Saint Vincent, following the resignation of Sir Joseph Lambert Eustace. A permanent replacement, David Emmanuel Jack, was not appointed until September 1989.

Government offices
Preceded by Sir Joseph Lambert Eustace	Governor-General of Saint Vincent and the Grenadines; Acting; 1988–1989	Succeeded by Sir David Emmanuel Jack
