= 2023 in Saint Vincent and the Grenadines =

- Decades: 2000s; 2010s; 2020s
- See also: Other events of 2023; Timeline of Vincentian history

Events in the year 2023 in Saint Vincent and the Grenadines.

== Incumbents ==
- Monarch: Charles III
- Governor General: Susan Dougan
- Prime Minister: Ralph Gonsalves

== Events ==
- 6 May – Governor-General Susan Dougan and Prime Minister Ralph Gonsalves attended the coronation of Charles III and Camilla.
- 12 December – 2023 Guayana Esequiba crisis: A meeting is to be held in Saint Vincent and the Grenadines on Thursday to discuss the ongoing dispute between Venezuela and Guyana. Both countries will try to prevent the crisis escalating into an armed conflict.
- 14 December – Venezuelan President Nicolás Maduro and Guyanese President Irfaan Ali hold talks in Kingstown, Saint Vincent and the Grenadines. Both leaders agree to neither use threats nor force against the other. A joint commission is announced to address the existing issues, with a report expected within three months.
