= Monica Dacon =

Saint Vincent and the Grenadines schoolteacher, educator and politician

Dame Monica Jessie Dacon DBE CMG
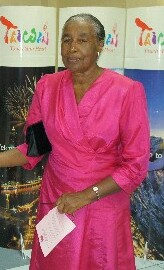
- Dacon in 2012

Acting Governor-General of Saint Vincent and the Grenadines
- In office 3 June 2002 – 22 June 2002
- Monarch: Elizabeth II
- Prime Minister: Ralph Gonsalves
- Preceded by: Charles Antrobus
- Succeeded by: Frederick Ballantyne

Personal details
- Born: 4 June 1934 (age 92)
- Spouse: St. Clair Dacon (deceased)
- Education: University of the West Indies

Dame Monica Jessie Dacon DBE, CMG (née Sheen, born 4 June 1934) is a Saint Vincent and the Grenadines former schoolteacher, educator and politician. She is the widow of parliamentarian St. Clair Dacon.

She attended The Girls' High School and passed both the Cambridge School Certificate and the Cambridge Higher School Certificate. In 1952 she began teaching at her alma mater and the Boys’ Grammar School. She would return to the Girls' High School eleven years later having taught in two Trinidad and Tobago schools, before returning to St. Vincent to teach at the Bishop's College, Kingstown in 1966.

She was acting Principal of Bishop's College for a few months before going back to the Girls' High School where she remained for nearly fifteen years. She continued her studies and gained the St. Vincent Teachers' College Certificate in 1980 and two years later her Bachelor of Education degree from the University of the West Indies. On her return to St. Vincent she moved from secondary education to the tertiary level and became a lecturer at the St. Vincent Teachers' Training College.

She was appointed Deputy Governor General in 2001 when Sir Charles Antrobus was Governor General. She became acting Governor-General of St. Vincent and the Grenadines, after the death of Charles Antrobus and until the appointment of Dr. Frederick Ballantyne as Governor General, on June 2, 2002. She was appointed Dame Commander of the Order of the British Empire (DBE) in the 2010 Birthday Honours/Overseas and Diplomatic List.

Government offices
Preceded by Charles Antrobus	Governor-General of Saint Vincent and the Grenadines; Acting; 2002	Succeeded by Frederick Ballantyne
