= Charles Antrobus =

Governor-General of Saint Vincent and the Grenadines

His Excellency Sir Charles Antrobus

Governor-General of Saint Vincent and the Grenadines
- In office 1 June 1996 – 3 June 2002
- Monarch: Elizabeth II
- Prime Minister: James Fitz-Allen Mitchell; Arnhim Eustace; Ralph Gonsalves
- Preceded by: David Emmanuel Jack
- Succeeded by: Frederick Ballantyne; Monica Dacon (Acting)

Personal details
- Born: 14 May 1933
- Died: 3 June 2002 (aged 69) Toronto, Canada

Sir Charles James Antrobus GCMG OBE (14 May 1933 – 3 June 2002) was the Governor-General of St. Vincent and the Grenadines from 1 June 1996 until his death. Antrobus was a master of the St. George’s Masonic Lodge, and spent most of his working life in Cable & Wireless plc.

He died in Toronto and was temporarily replaced by Monica Dacon.

Government offices
Preceded by Sir David Jack	Governor-General of Saint Vincent and the Grenadines; 1996–2002	Succeeded by Monica Dacon; Acting
