= Sydney Gun-Munro =

Governor-General of Saint Vincent and the Grenadines (1916–2007)

His Excellency Sir Sydney Gun-Munro GCMG OBE FRCS

1st Governor-General of Saint Vincent and the Grenadines
- In office 27 October 1979 – 28 February 1985
- Monarch: Elizabeth II
- Prime Minister: Milton Cato; James Fitz-Allen Mitchell
- Preceded by: Office Established; Himself as Governor
- Succeeded by: Joseph Lambert Eustace

Governor of Saint Vincent and the Grenadines
- In office 1976–1979
- Monarch: Elizabeth II
- Prime Minister: Milton Cato
- Preceded by: Rupert Godfrey John
- Succeeded by: Office Abolished; Himself as Governor-General

Personal details
- Born: 29 November 1916 Grenada
- Died: 1 March 2007 (aged 90) Bequia
- Spouse: Joan Gun-Munro († 2009)
- Education: King's College London

Sir Sydney Douglas Gun-Munro GCMG OBE FRCS (29 November 1916 – 1 March 2007) was the first Governor-General of Saint Vincent and the Grenadines from 1979 to 1985. He was educated at Grenada Boys' Secondary School where he won a scholarship, and in 1937 travelled to King's College London where he studied medicine, graduating in 1942.

Government offices
Preceded by Rupert John	Governor of Saint Vincent and the Grenadines; 1976–1979	Post abolished
New creation	Governor-General of Saint Vincent and the Grenadines; 1979–1985	Succeeded by Joseph Lambert Eustace
