= Joseph Lambert Eustace =

Vincentian politician

His Excellency Joseph Lambert Eustace GCMG GCVO

2nd Governor-General of Saint Vincent and the Grenadines
- In office 28 February 1985 – 29 February 1988
- Monarch: Elizabeth II
- Prime Minister: James Fitz-Allen Mitchell
- Preceded by: Sydney Gun-Munro
- Succeeded by: David Emmanuel Jack

Personal details
- Born: 28 February 1908
- Died: 2 November 1996 (aged 88)
- Spouse: Elaine Harold
- Children: 1

Sir Joseph Lambert Eustace, GCMG, GCVO (28 February 1908 – 2 November 1996) was a Saint Vincent and the Grenadines politician. He was born as the second son of Reynold Lambert Eustace and Beatrice St. Hilaire Eustace of Mayreau in the St. Vincent Grenadines. Together with his brother John Parmenas Eustace he founded the Intermediate High School in November 1926 and taught there until around 1932 when he joined the staff of the St. Vincent Boys Grammar School.

A keen cricketer in his youth, he retained a lifelong interest in the sport. He was also an avid reader and national Chess Champion and enjoyed woodworking in his spare time.

He married Elaine Harold in 1941 and had a daughter, Elaine Marjorie Delores, born in 1942. His wife died shortly thereafter and he was married a second time to Faustina Gatherer in 1947. They had a son, Reynold Lambert Mountbatten in 1948 and a daughter, Margaret-Ann, in 1952.

From 1950 to 1959 he was Manager of the Government Cotton Ginnery at Richmond Hill. The ginnery burnt to the ground in 1959 and was not rebuilt. He then built and operated his own oil and soap factory along with a cotton ginnery at Montrose from 1960 to 1967.

In 1963 he became a member of the Saint Vincent Labour Party headed by Robert Milton Cato and successfully contested the South Leeward seat in the 1964 election. The party however, remained in Opposition. He was re-elected an MP in the 1967 election which the Labour Party won and then became Minister of Education until he resigned in 1971. He was appointed Speaker of the House of Assembly where he served from 1972 to 1974 before retiring. He was appointed Governor-General of Saint Vincent and the Grenadines in February 1985 and served in this capacity until February 1988.

He died on 2 November 1996 at the age of 88.
