= David Emmanuel Jack =

His Excellency Sir David Emmanuel Jack GCMG MBE

Governor-General of Saint Vincent and the Grenadines
- In office 20 September 1989 – 1 June 1996
- Monarch: Elizabeth II
- Prime Minister: James Fitz-Allen Mitchell
- Preceded by: Henry Harvey Williams
- Succeeded by: Charles Antrobus

Personal details
- Born: 16 July 1918
- Died: 18 July 1998 (aged 80)
- Party: New Democratic Party

Sir David Emmanuel Jack GCMG MBE (16 July 1918 – 18 July 1998) was Governor-General of Saint Vincent and the Grenadines from 1989 to 1996. He was born in Victoria Village, St Vincent and the Grenadines. He also served as Health Minister from 1986 to 1989, and also as Minister of Labour, and also Deputy Prime Minister during the New Democratic Party administration.

Government offices
Preceded by Henry Williams (acting)	Governor-General of Saint Vincent and the Grenadines; 1989–1996	Succeeded by Sir Charles Antrobus
