= Monarchy of Saint Vincent and the Grenadines =

King of Saint Vincent and the Grenadines
- Coat of arms of Saint Vincent and the Grenadines

Incumbent
- Charles III since 8 September 2022

Details
- Style: His Majesty
- Heir apparent: William, Prince of Wales
- First monarch: Elizabeth II
- Formed: 27 October 1979

The monarchy of Saint Vincent and the Grenadines is a system of government in which a hereditary monarch is the sovereign and head of state of Saint Vincent and the Grenadines. The current Vincentian monarch and head of state, since 8 September 2022, is King Charles III. As sovereign, he is the personal embodiment of the Vincentian Crown. Although the person of the sovereign is equally shared with 14 other independent countries within the Commonwealth of Nations, each country's monarchy is separate and legally distinct. As a result, the current monarch is officially titled King of Saint Vincent and the Grenadines and, in this capacity, he and other members of the royal family undertake public and private functions domestically and abroad as representatives of Saint Vincent and the Grenadines. However, the King is the only member of the royal family with any constitutional role.

All executive authority is vested in the monarch, and royal assent is required for the Parliament of Saint Vincent and the Grenadines to enact laws and for letters patent and Orders in Council to have legal effect. Most of the powers are exercised by the elected members of parliament, the ministers of the Crown generally drawn from amongst them, and the judges and justices of the peace. Other powers vested in the monarch, such as dismissal of a prime minister, are significant but are treated only as reserve powers and as an important security part of the role of the monarchy.

The history of monarchy in Saint Vincent and the Grenadines has evolved through a succession of French and British sovereigns, into the independent Vincentian sovereigns of today. The Crown primarily functions as a guarantor of continuous and stable governance and a nonpartisan safeguard against the abuse of power. While some powers are exercisable only by the sovereign, most of the monarch's operational and ceremonial duties are exercised by his representative, the governor-general of Saint Vincent and the Grenadines.

== Origins ==
It is thought that Christopher Columbus sighted the island in 1498, giving it the name "Saint Vincent". The indigenous Kalinago people aggressively prevented European settlement on Saint Vincent. Various attempts by the English and Dutch to claim the island proved unsuccessful, and it was the French who were first able to colonise the island in 1719. The British captured the island and drove out the French during the Seven Years' War, a claim confirmed by the Treaty of Paris (1763). During the Anglo-French War (1778–1783), the French recaptured St Vincent in 1779. However, the British regained control under the Treaty of Versailles (1783). The islands became part of the British Windward Islands, a British colony, in the late 1700s.

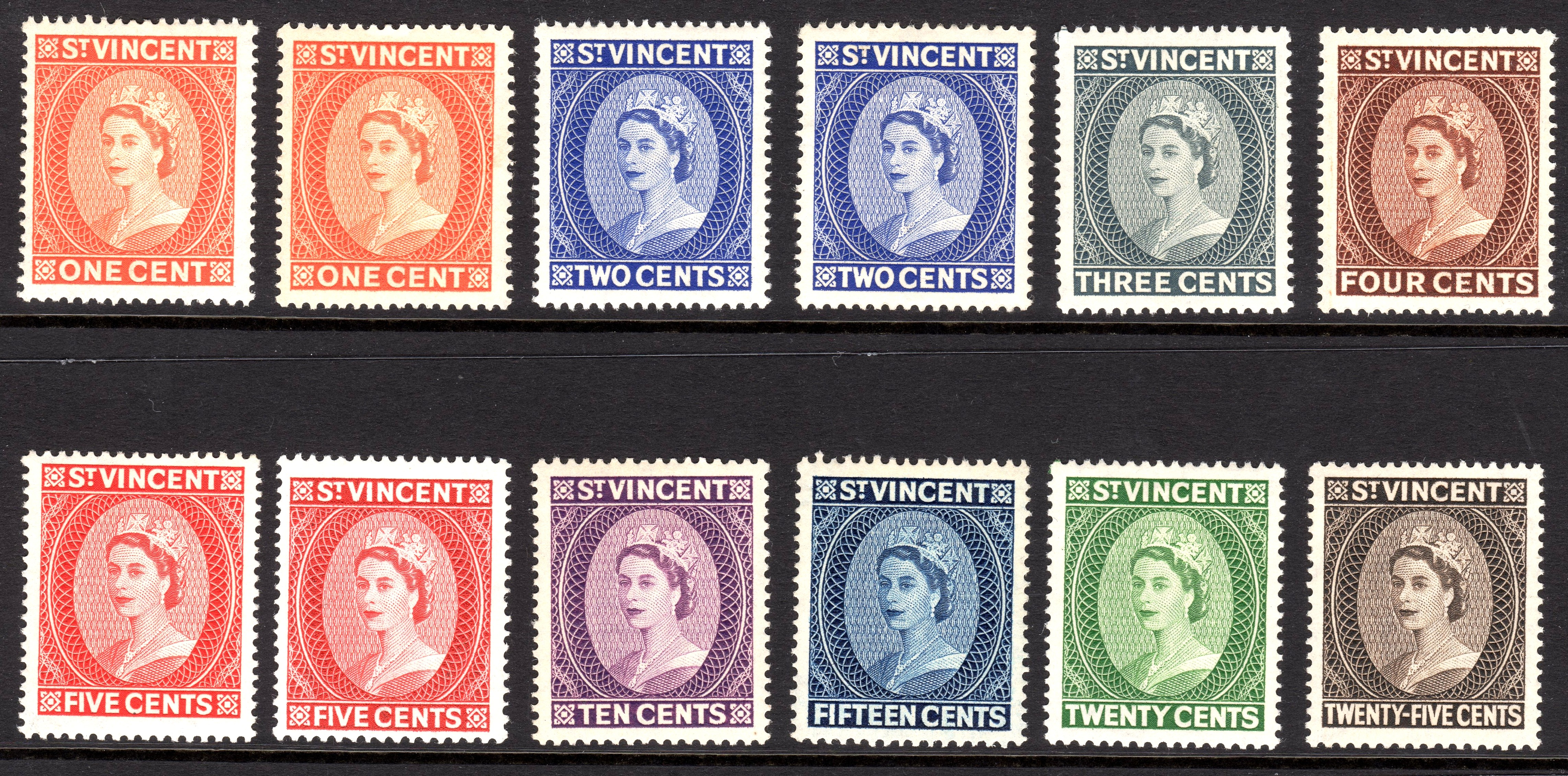
Queen Elizabeth II on Vincentian stamps, 1955

Saint Vincent and the Grenadines passed through various stages of colonial status under the British. A representative assembly was authorised in 1776, Crown Colony government was installed in 1877, a legislative council was created in 1925 with a limited franchise, and universal adult suffrage was granted in 1951. During the period of its control of Saint Vincent and the Grenadines, Britain made several attempts to unify the island with the other Windward Islands as a single entity, to simplify British control in the sub-region through a single unified administration. Saint Vincent also joined the West Indies Federation in 1958, but the federation collapsed in 1962. Saint Vincent was granted "associate statehood" status by Britain on 27 October 1969, giving it complete control over its internal affairs. On 27 October 1979, Saint Vincent and the Grenadines gained full independence from the United Kingdom. It thus became a sovereign state and an independent monarchy within the Commonwealth of Nations, with Queen Elizabeth II as monarch and head of state.

Prince Richard, Duke of Gloucester represented the Queen at the independence celebrations. On 27 October, the Duke handed the constitutional instruments to Prime Minister Milton Cato formally declaring the country independent. The Duke also opened the first session of the first parliament on behalf of the monarch. The Queen sent a message to the people of Saint Vincent and the Grenadines, in which she said, "It is with much pleasure that I send my warmest congratulations both as your Queen and as Head of the Commonwealth of which you are becoming the Forty-second member".

== The Vincentian Crown and its aspects ==
She really wants you to know how much she appreciates the fact that you continue to look to her as your Queen and as your Head of State and she appreciates the loyalty that you have shown to her over all these years.

— Prince Edward, Earl of Wessex, 2012

Saint Vincent and the Grenadines is one of fifteen independent nations, known as Commonwealth realms, which shares its sovereign with other realms in the Commonwealth of Nations, with the monarch's relationship with Saint Vincent and the Grenadines completely independent from his position as monarch of any other realm. Despite sharing the same person as their respective monarch, each of the Commonwealth realms — including Saint Vincent and the Grenadines — is sovereign and independent of the others. The Vincentian monarch is represented by a viceroy—the governor-general of Saint Vincent and the Grenadines—in the country.

Since Vincentian independence in 1979, the pan-national Crown has had both a shared and a separate character and the sovereign's role as monarch of Saint Vincent and the Grenadines is distinct to his or her position as monarch of any other realm, including the United Kingdom. The monarchy thus ceased to be an exclusively British institution and in Saint Vincent and the Grenadines became a Vincentian, or "domesticated" establishment.

Flag of the governor-general of Saint Vincent and the Grenadines featuring St Edward's Crown

This division is illustrated in a number of ways: the sovereign, for example, holds a unique Vincentian title and, when he is acting in public specifically as a representative of Saint Vincent and the Grenadines, he uses, where possible, national symbols of Saint Vincent and the Grenadines, including the country's national flag, and the like. Also, only Vincentian government ministers can advise the sovereign on matters of Saint Vincent and the Grenadines.

In Saint Vincent and the Grenadines, the legal personality of the State is referred to as "His Majesty in Right of Saint Vincent and the Grenadines".

=== Title ===
In Saint Vincent and the Grenadines, the monarch's official title is: Charles the Third, by the Grace of God, King of Saint Vincent and the Grenadines and His other Realms and Territories, Head of the Commonwealth.

This style communicates the status of Saint Vincent and the Grenadines as an independent monarchy, highlighting the monarch's role specifically as sovereign of Saint Vincent and the Grenadines, as well as the shared aspect of the Crown throughout the realms. Typically, the sovereign is styled "King of Saint Vincent and the Grenadines", and is addressed as such when in Saint Vincent and the Grenadines, or performing duties on behalf of Saint Vincent and the Grenadines abroad.

=== Succession ===
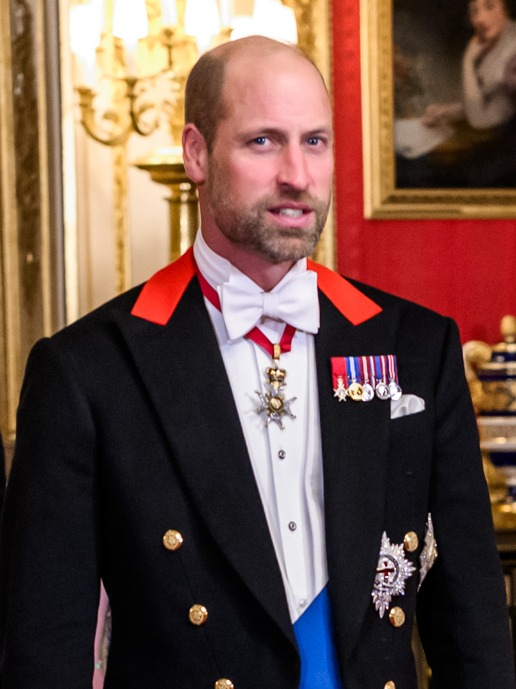
William, Prince of Wales, is the current heir apparent to the throne of Saint Vincent and the Grenadines

Succession is by absolute primogeniture governed by the provisions of the Succession to the Crown Act 2013, as well as the Act of Settlement, 1701, and the Bill of Rights, 1689. This legislation limits the succession to the natural (i.e. non-adopted), legitimate descendants of Sophia, Electress of Hanover, and stipulates that the monarch cannot be a Roman Catholic, and must be in communion with the Church of England upon ascending the throne.

Though these constitutional laws, as they apply to Saint Vincent and the Grenadines, still lie within the control of the British parliament, both the United Kingdom and Saint Vincent and the Grenadines cannot change the rules of succession without the unanimous consent of the other realms, unless explicitly leaving the shared monarchy relationship; a situation that applies identically in all the other realms, and which has been likened to a treaty amongst these countries. Saint Vincent and the Grenadines last indicated its consent to alteration to the line of succession in 2013, when the House of Assembly passed the Succession To The Crown Act on 3 July 2013, which signified the legislature's acceptance to the British Parliament's Succession to the Crown Act 2013. The governor-general assented to the act on 4 July 2013.

Upon a demise of the Crown (the death or abdication of a sovereign), it is customary for the accession of the new monarch to be proclaimed by the governor-general in the capital, Kingstown, after the accession. Regardless of any proclamations, the late sovereign's heir immediately and automatically succeeds, without any need for confirmation or further ceremony. An appropriate period of mourning also follows, during which flags across the country are flown at half-mast to honour the late monarch.

== Personification of the state ==
As the living embodiment of the Vincentian Crown, the sovereign is regarded as the personification, or legal personality, of Saint Vincent and the Grenadines, with the state therefore referred to as His Majesty in right of His Government in Saint Vincent and the Grenadines, The King (Saint Vincent and the Grenadines), or simply The King. As such, the monarch is the owner of all state property – for instance, prisons in Saint Vincent and the Grenadines are called His Majesty's Prisons – though, this is all in his position as sovereign, and not as an individual; all such property is held by the Crown in perpetuity and cannot be sold by the sovereign without the proper advice and consent of his ministers.

== Constitutional role ==
Governor-General Dame Susan Dougan meeting President Ram Nath Kovind of India in 2022

The Constitution of Saint Vincent and the Grenadines is made up of a variety of statutes and conventions, which gives the country a similar parliamentary system of government as the other Commonwealth realms. All powers of state are constitutionally reposed in the monarch, who is represented in the country by a governor-general — appointed by the monarch upon the advice of the prime minister of Saint Vincent and the Grenadines.

The role of the monarch and the governor-general is both legal and practical, but not political. The Crown is regarded as a corporation, in which several parts share the authority of the whole, with the sovereign as the person at the centre of the constitutional construct, meaning all powers of state are constitutionally reposed in the monarch. All institutions of government act under the sovereign's authority; the vast powers that belong to the Crown are collectively known as the Royal Prerogative, which includes many powers such as the ability to make treaties or send ambassadors, as well as certain duties such as to defend the realm and to maintain the King's peace. Parliamentary approval is not required for the exercise of the Royal Prerogative; moreover, the Consent of the Crown must be obtained before either House may even debate a bill affecting the Sovereign's prerogatives or interests.

=== Executive ===
One of the main duties of the Crown is to appoint a prime minister, who thereafter heads the cabinet and advises the monarch or governor-general on how to execute their executive powers over all aspects of government operations and foreign affairs. The monarch's, and thereby the viceroy's role is almost entirely symbolic and cultural, acting as a symbol of the legal authority under which all governments and agencies operate, while the Cabinet directs the use of the Royal Prerogative, which includes the privilege to declare war, and maintain the King's peace, as well as to summon and prorogue parliament and call elections. However, the Royal Prerogative belongs to the Crown and not to any of the ministers, though it might have sometimes appeared that way, and the constitution allows the governor-general to unilaterally use these powers in relation to the dismissal of a prime minister, dissolution of parliament, and removal of a judge in exceptional, constitutional crisis situations.

There are also a few duties which are specifically performed by the monarch, such as appointing the governor-general.

The governor-general, to maintain the stability of the government of Saint Vincent and the Grenadines, appoints as prime minister the individual most likely to maintain the support of the House of Assembly of Saint Vincent and the Grenadines. The governor-general additionally appoints other ministers, at the direction of the prime minister. The monarch is informed by his viceroy of the acceptance of the resignation of a prime minister and the swearing-in of a new prime minister and other members of the ministry, he remains fully briefed through regular communications from his Vincentian ministers, and he holds regular audiences with them whenever possible.

=== Foreign affairs ===
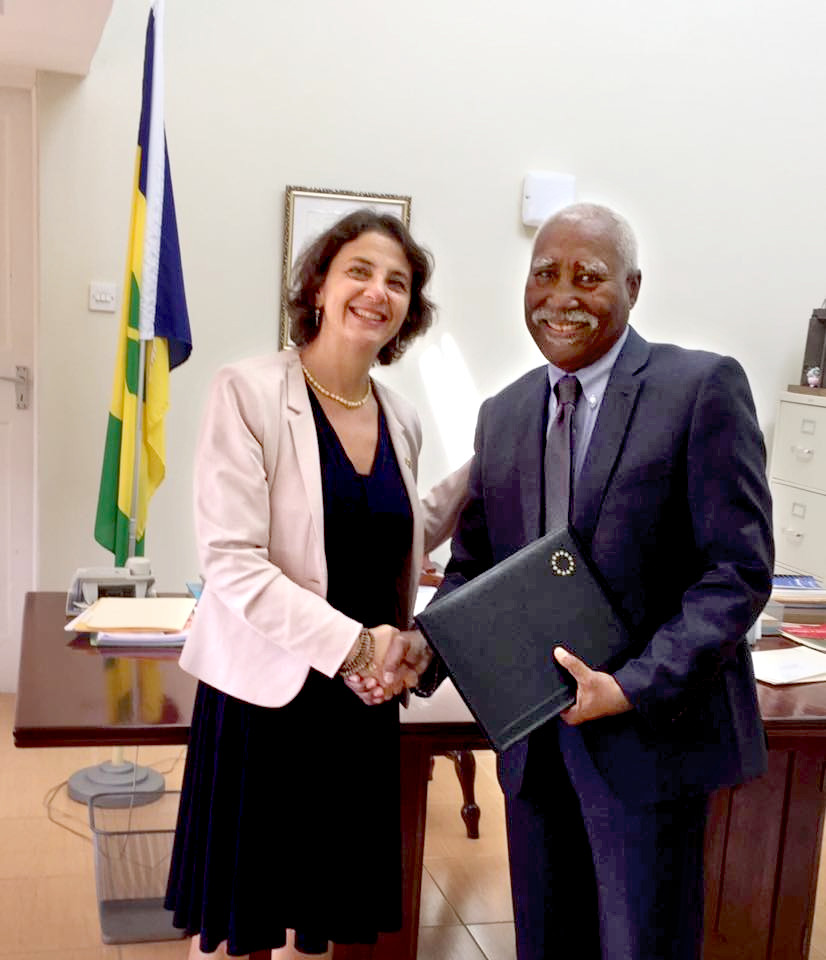
EU ambassador Daniela Tramacere presenting her credentials to Governor-General Sir Frederick Ballantyne, 2017

The Royal Prerogative further extends to foreign affairs: the governor-general ratifies treaties, alliances, and international agreements. As with other uses of the Royal Prerogative, no parliamentary approval is required. However, a treaty cannot alter the domestic laws of Saint Vincent and the Grenadines; an Act of Parliament is necessary in such cases. The monarch, and by extension the governor-general, also accredits Vincentian High Commissioners and ambassadors, and receives diplomats from foreign states.

In foreign policy, the monarch acts solely on the advice of the respective realm government, which can sometimes lead to anomalies in diplomatic recognition. For instance, in 2022, Elizabeth II as Queen of Saint Vincent and the Grenadines accredited a new Vincentian ambassador to "His Excellency Nicolás Maduro Moros President of the Bolivarian Republic of Venezuela", whereas, she, as Queen of the United Kingdom, recognised Juan Guaido as Venezuela's head of state.

In addition, the issuance of passports falls under the Royal Prerogative and, as such, all Saint Vincent and the Grenadines passports are issued in the governor-general's name, the monarch's representative in Saint Vincent and the Grenadines.

=== Parliament ===
The sovereign, along with the House of Assembly, is one of the two components of the Parliament of Saint Vincent and the Grenadines. The authority of the Crown is embodied in the mace of the House of Assembly, which bears a crown at its apex.

The monarch does not, however, participate in the legislative process; the viceroy does, though only in the granting of Royal Assent. Further, the constitution outlines that the governor-general alone is responsible for appointing senators. The viceroy must make six senatorial appointments, four on the advice of the prime minister, and two on the advice of the leader of the opposition. The viceroy additionally summons, prorogues, and dissolves parliament; after the latter, the writs for a general election are usually dropped by the governor-general at Government House, Kingstown.

The new parliamentary session is marked by the Opening of Parliament, during which the monarch or the governor-general reads the Speech from the Throne.

All laws in Saint Vincent and the Grenadines are enacted only with the viceroy's granting of Royal Assent in the monarch's name. Thus, bills begin with the phrase: "Be it enacted by the King's Most Excellent Majesty, by and with the advice and consent of the House of Assembly of Saint Vincent and the Grenadines and by the authority of the same, as follows". The Royal Assent, and proclamation, are required for all acts of parliament, usually granted or withheld by the governor-general, with the Public Seal of Saint Vincent and the Grenadines.

=== Courts ===
The sovereign is responsible for rendering justice for all his subjects, and is thus traditionally deemed the fount of justice. In Saint Vincent and the Grenadines, criminal offences are legally deemed to be offences against the sovereign and proceedings for indictable offences are brought in the sovereign's name in the form of The King [or Queen] versus [Name]. Hence, the common law holds that the sovereign "can do no wrong"; the monarch cannot be prosecuted in his own courts for criminal offences.

The highest court of appeal for Saint Vincent and the Grenadines is the Judicial Committee of the King's Privy Council.

The governor-general, on behalf of the Vincentian monarch, can also grant immunity from prosecution, exercise the royal prerogative of mercy, and pardon offences against the Crown, either before, during, or after a trial. The exercise of the 'Prerogative of mercy' to grant a pardon and the commutation of prison sentences is described in section 65 of the Constitution.

Any attempt to kill the monarch or the governor-general is considered "high treason", and the person guilty of the offence is sentenced to death.

== Cultural role ==
=== The Crown and Honours ===
The monarch, as the fount of honour, confers awards and honours in the country in his name. Most of them are often awarded on the advice of "His Majesty's Saint Vincent and the Grenadines Ministers". Requests for nominations of deserving Vincentians for honours from the King are received by the governor-general in June and January for the forthcoming New Year Honours and the Birthday Honours, respectively.

In 2019, Prime Minister Ralph Gonsalves rejected calls for instituting the country's own national honours system, and said, "the knighthoods, the dames, the CBE, the CMG, the OBE, the MBE, they are all national awards, because they are the honours of the Queen of Saint Vincent and the Grenadines, who was approved in a referendum".

=== The Crown and the Police Force ===
The badge of the Royal Saint Vincent and the Grenadines Police Force featuring St. Edward's Crown

The national police force of Saint Vincent and the Grenadines is known as the "Royal Saint Vincent and the Grenadines Police Force".

The Crown also sits at the pinnacle of the country's police force. All new recruits into the force must swear allegiance to the monarch, as the embodiment of the state and its authority, before entering their duties. Under the Police Act, the oath is:

"I, (name), do swear that I will well and truly serve Our Sovereign Lord the King as a member of the Police Force in Saint Vincent and the Grenadines without favour or affection, malice or ill will; and that I will cause His Majesty's peace to be preserved, and will prevent, to the utmost of my power, offences against the same, and that, during any time that I do or may hereafter hold any appointment in the Police Force, I will to the best of my knowledge and skill discharge all the duties thereof faithfully according to law. So help me God!"

The Crown of St. Edward appears on the police force's badges and rank insignia, which illustrates the monarchy as the locus of authority.

=== Royal visits ===
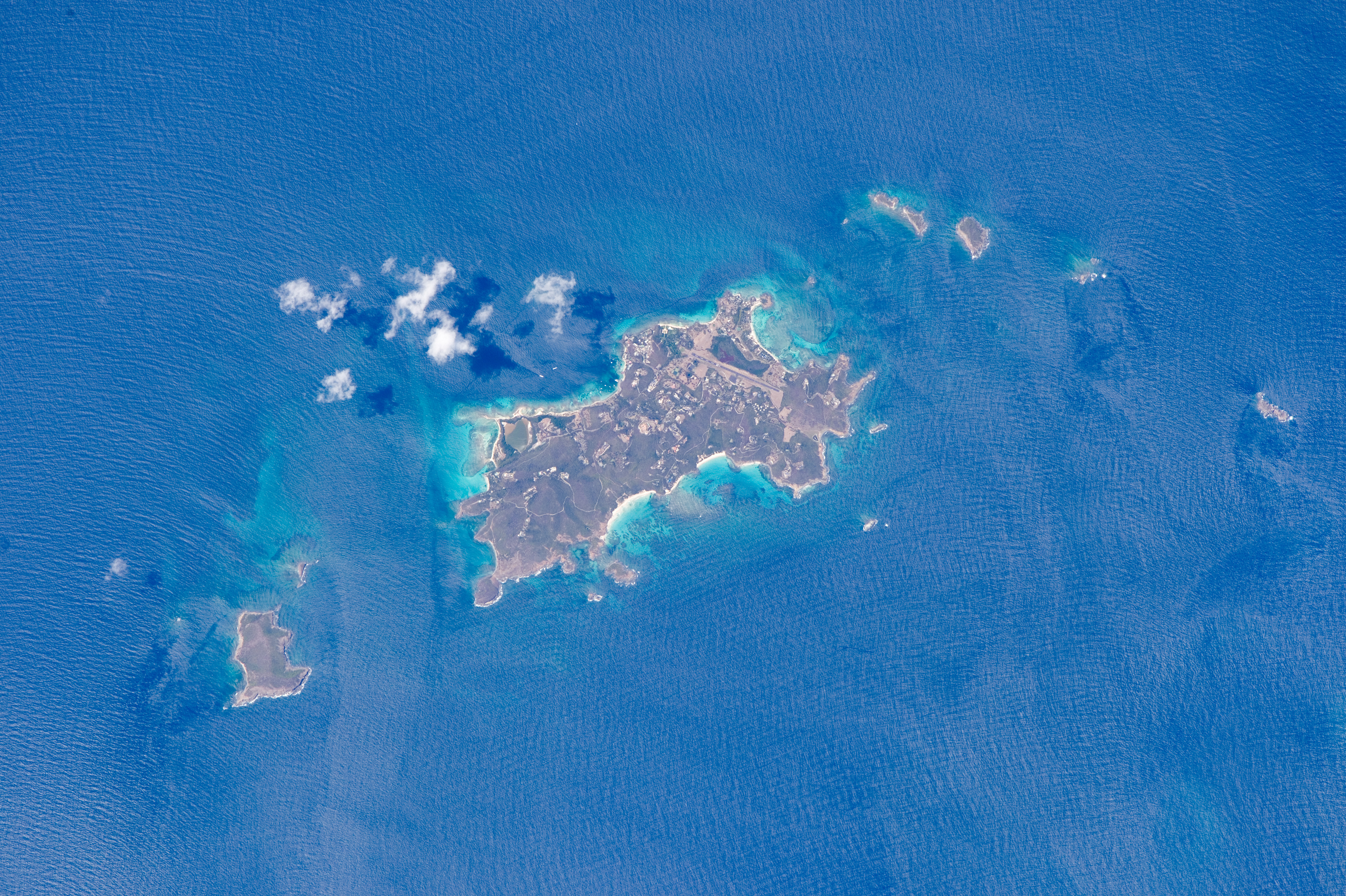
Princess Margaret said that Mustique (pictured) is "the only place I can relax".

In 1959, the Les Jolies Eaux villa on the island of Mustique was given as a wedding present to Princess Margaret by Colin Tennant, later Lord Glenconner. The Princess first visited Mustique with her husband in 1960, during their six-week honeymoon. Margaret frequently came to Mustique, usually twice a year, and is said to have loved the place. In 1996, Princess Margaret gave the property to her son, David Linley, as a wedding gift. Linley subsequently sold the villa in 1999 for £2.4 million, reportedly to the distress of his mother.

Queen Elizabeth II visited in 1966, where she attended a morning service at St George’s Cathedral, and visited the Colonial Hospital and the Victoria Park. In 1979, Prince Richard, Duke of Gloucester represented the Queen at the independence celebrations. In 1985, the Queen and the Duke of Edinburgh attended the Independence Anniversary Parade at Victoria Park. Prince Philip presented Duke of Edinburgh's Award Scheme Gold Awards during a ceremony at Government House. The Duke of York visited in 2004. The Duke visited the Botanical Gardens in Kingstown, the Liberty Lodge Boys Training School and a banana farm in Mesopotamia Valley.

In 2012, the Earl and Countess of Wessex visited the country to mark the Queen's Diamond Jubilee. The couple visited both the main island of Saint Vincent and smaller island of Bequia, where they took part in ceremonial tree planting, watched traditional maypole dancing and steel orchestra performances. Prince Harry visited in 2016. The Prince visited Kingstown's Botanic Gardens, and the Vermont Nature Trail, where he unveiled a dedication to The Queen's Commonwealth Canopy. The Prince also interacted with local school children to learn about the various conservation projects to help preserve these endangered species.

My family has long enjoyed a particularly close association with these beautiful islands, and so it gives us such pleasure that we should be able to visit you and to bring with us The Queen's warmest greetings.

— Charles, Prince of Wales, 2019

The Prince of Wales and the Duchess of Cornwall visited Saint Vincent and the Grenadines in March 2019. At Prospect Brighton Mangrove Park, the Prince was given a tour of the Mangroves, while the Duchess visited Saint Vincent and the Grenadines Community College for a roundtable discussion on domestic violence. At the Saint Vincent and Grenadines Coastguard, the Prince met young people who had recently completed the Youth Development Summer Programme. The Prince and the Duchess joined together in Kingstown for a wreath laying ceremony at the city's Cenotaph, and later toured the Kingstown Market. The Prince later visited St George's Cathedral, while the Duchess visited St Vincent Girls' High School for an event to celebrate the Queen's Commonwealth Essay Competition. At the Botanical Gardens, the Prince planted a Soufriere Tree, the national flower of Saint Vincent and the Grenadines.

The Earl and Countess of Wessex visited in April 2022 to mark the Queen's Platinum Jubilee. The Earl visited the Diamond Track at the Sir Vincent Beach National Stadium, where a special 70m sprint was held in honour of the Queen's 70-year reign, and the Earl presented trophies to the winners. At Arnos Playing Field, the Earl met some of the national sports teams, while the Countess visited the La Garcia Dance Company, and later met representatives from the Society of and for the Blind. The Earl and Countess later attended a reception for The Duke of Edinburgh's International Award, where they presented Gold Awards to 13 people. At the Botanical Gardens, the couple met local school children and planted a tree to mark the Queen's Platinum Jubilee.

== Debate ==
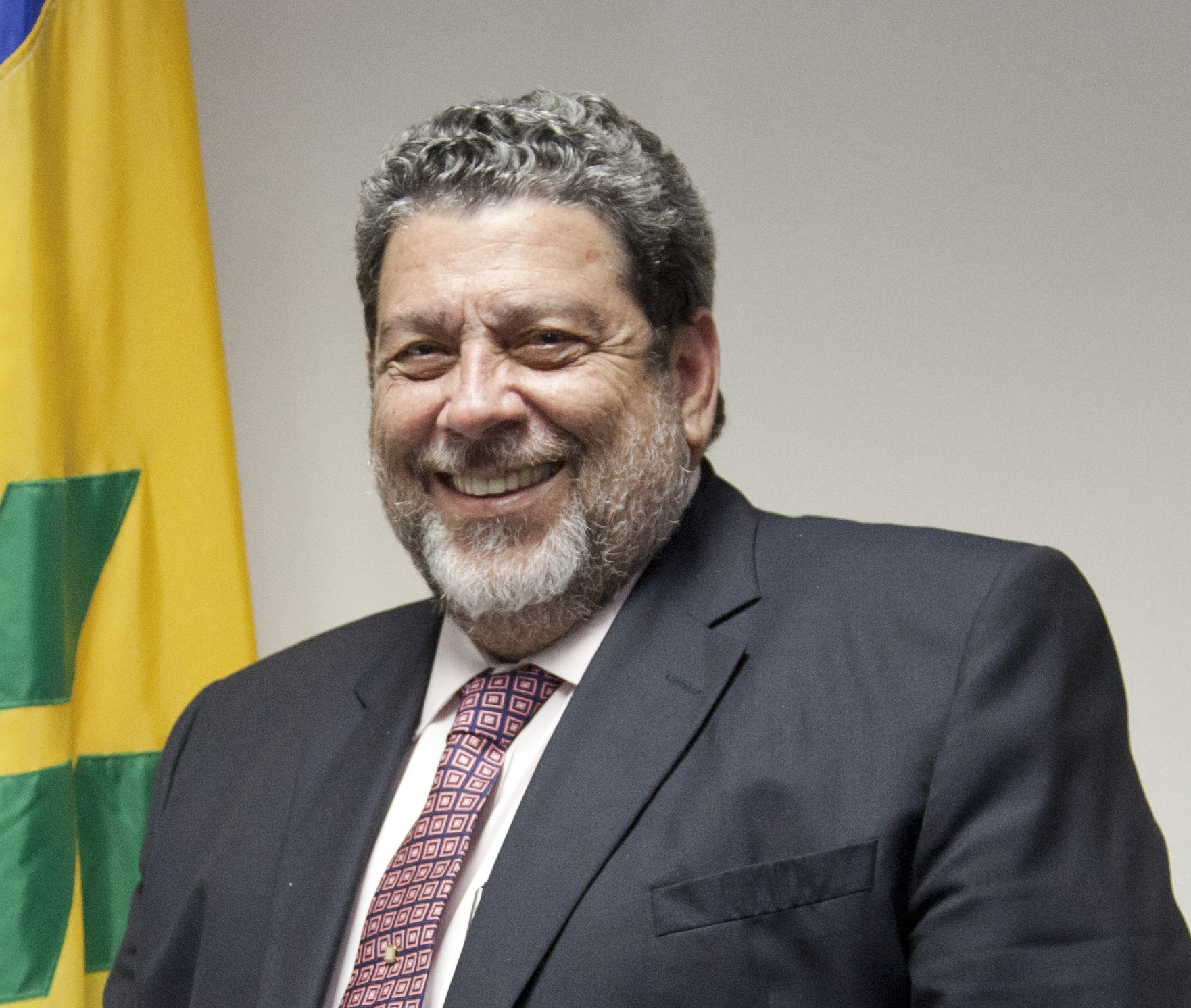
Ralph Gonsalves, former Prime Minister of Saint Vincent and the Grenadines, has advocated for making Saint Vincent and the Grenadines a republic

In 2002, Prime Minister Ralph Gonsalves initiated a seven-year process to reform the 1979 constitution, which culminated in 2009 with the passing of the Saint Vincent and the Grenadines Constitution Act, 2009 in the House of Assembly. The act proposed to replace the monarch with a non-executive president. Vincentians were asked in a referendum whether they approved of the new constitution which would have replaced the constitution in force since independence in 1979. Gonsalves and his Unity Labour Party (ULP) campaigned heavily for the "Yes" vote, Gonsalves advocating that, though he had nothing personally against Queen Elizabeth II, he believed it was time for Saint Vincent to stop having a monarch as its head of state; he offered the opinion: "I find it a bit of a Nancy story that the Queen of England can really be the Queen of Saint Vincent and the Grenadines". Opposition to the constitutional changes was led by the New Democratic Party (NDP), which held the position that the proposed constitution would neither reduce the power of the prime minister nor strengthen the country's democracy.

The referendum was held on 25 November 2009, just days before the Queen was in the Caribbean for a Commonwealth Heads of Government Meeting. Voting took place in heavy rain, with 52,262 of the 97,724 eligible Vincentians casting ballots at 225 polling stations. The Supervisor of Elections opined that this was a good turn-out given the inclement weather. The proposal was defeated by 56% votes, while only 43% of voters supported the new constitution, well short of the required two-thirds threshold.

In 2016, Gonsalves presented a bill in Parliament which amended the oaths of allegiance and office, removing the mention of the monarch. Instead of swearing allegiance to the Queen, her heirs and successors, officials are required to swear loyalty to Saint Vincent and the Grenadines under the Oaths by Officials Act. Gonsalves said the change in law in did not imply any disrespect to the Queen, and he didn't expect that in serving the people of Saint Vincent and the Grenadines "we will not be serving Her Majesty".

In 2019, during the visit of the Prince of Wales and the Duchess of Cornwall, Gonsalves ruled out another referendum on the monarchy and said, "I'm not a monarchist, but I accept it, the Queen of England not only legally but politically is the Queen of St Vincent and the Grenadines and I accept that". But in 2022, Gonsalves again proposed a single-item referendum on the monarchy, which he said would only pursue if there is bipartisan support. In May 2023, around the time of the coronation of King Charles III, Gonsalves labelled the monarchy "an absurdity" which he wished to end in his lifetime, while a poll by Lord Ashcroft found that 63% of Vincentians supported the continuation of their monarchy and 34% preferring an elected head of state, with the majority saying that the King and the royal family "care a lot" about Saint Vincent and the Grenadines.

== List of Vincentian monarchs ==
Portrait	Regnal name (Birth–Death)	Reign over Saint Vincent and the Grenadines		Full name	Consort	House
Portrait	Regnal name (Birth–Death)	Start	End	Full name	Consort	House
	Elizabeth II (1926–2022)	27 October 1979	8 September 2022	Elizabeth Alexandra Mary	Philip Mountbatten	Windsor
	Elizabeth II (1926–2022)	Governors-general: Sir Sydney Gun-Munro, Sir Joseph Lambert Eustace, Sir David Emmanuel Jack, Sir Charles Antrobus, Sir Frederick Ballantyne, Dame Susan Dougan; Prime ministers: Milton Cato, Sir James Fitz-Allen Mitchell, Arnhim Eustace, Ralph Gonsalves				
	Charles III (b. 1948)	8 September 2022	present	Charles Philip Arthur George	Camilla Shand	Windsor
	Charles III (b. 1948)	Governors-general: Dame Susan Dougan, Sir Stanley John; Prime ministers: Ralph Gonsalves, Godwin Friday				

== See also ==
- Lists of office-holders
- List of prime ministers of Elizabeth II
- List of prime ministers of Charles III
- List of Commonwealth visits made by Elizabeth II
- Monarchies in the Americas
- List of monarchies
