= COVID-19 pandemic in Saint Vincent and the Grenadines =

- Disease: COVID-19
- Pathogen: SARS-CoV-2
- Location: Saint Vincent and the Grenadines
- First outbreak: Wuhan, Hubei, China
- Arrival date: 11 March 2020 (6 years, 5 months, 1 week and 4 days)
- Confirmed cases: 1,818 (as of 15 April 2021)
- Active cases: 131 (as of 15 April 2021)
- Recovered: 1,677 (as of 15 April 2021)
- Deaths: 10 (as of 15 April 2021)
- Fatality rate: 0.55% (as of 15 April 2021)

Government website
- http://www.gov.vc/

The COVID-19 pandemic in Saint Vincent and the Grenadines was a part of the global viral pandemic of coronavirus disease 2019 (COVID-19), which was confirmed to have reached Saint Vincent and the Grenadines in March 2020. The first confirmed case was discovered on 11 March 2020.

== Timeline ==
Cases

Deaths

=== March 2020 ===
On 11 March 2020, Saint Vincent and the Grenadines confirmed its first case. The passenger had travelled from the United Kingdom to Saint Vincent via Barbados. They travelled on British Airways to Barbados and onward to Saint Vincent via LIAT.

On 27 March 2020, it was announced by Minister of Health Senator Luke Browne, that a repeat test for the patient who originally tested positive was now negative.

=== April to June 2020 ===
On 1 April 2020, St. Vincent and the Grenadines recorded its second confirmed case of COVID-19. Prime Minister Ralph Gonsalves announced that the annual Vincy Mas festival will be cancelled for 2020, in order to protect the population from the spread of the COVID-19 virus.

On 2 April 2020, it was announced by Ministry of Health announced that a 3rd case was recorded.

On 3 April 2020, it was announced by Ministry of Health announced that 4 addition cases were recorded, bringing the total cases up to 7.

On 5 April, the Queen of Saint Vincent and the Grenadines addressed the Commonwealth in a televised broadcast, in which she asked people to "take comfort that while we may have more still to endure, better days will return". She added, "we will be with our friends again; we will be with our families again; we will meet again".

19 May 2020, it was announced by Ministry of Health announced that an 18th case was recorded.

29 May 2020, it was announced by Ministry of Health announced that a 26th case was recorded.

7 June 2020, it was announced there were one new COVID-19 cases in Saint Vincent and the Grenadines.

16 June 2020, it was announced there were two new COVID-19 cases in Saint Vincent and the Grenadines.

25 June 2020, it was announced there were no active COVID-19 cases in Saint Vincent and the Grenadines.

=== July to September 2020 ===
12 July 2020, it was announced there were 6 new COVID-19 cases in Saint Vincent and the Grenadines. Two of the new cases are from an American Airlines flight that had arrived from Miami on 11 July 2020, and a number of passengers who had arrived on that flight had broken their 24-hour quarantine.

18 July 2020, it was announced there were 3 new COVID-19 cases.

19 July 2020, it was announced there were 6 additional COVID-19 cases.

29 July 2020, it was announced there were 2 additional COVID-19 cases.

9 August 2020, it was announced there were 2 additional COVID-19 cases, 3 recoveries, and 5 active cases.

13 August 2020, it was announced there were 3 additional COVID-19 recoveries, and only 2 active cases.

25 August 2020, it was announced there is only 1 active cases.

27 August 2020, it was announced that 2 guests staying at the 5 star Mandarin Oriental Resort on Canouan have tested positive.

1 September 2020, it was announced that an additional person from a group of Swedish travelers who arrived on 19 August from Grenada has tested positive.

6 September 2020, it was announced that there was one additional recovery.

7 September 2020, it was announced that there was one additional case of a Vincentian national who arrived in St. Vincent and the Grenadines on 5 September from Jamaica

11 September 2020, it was announced that there were two additional cases of Vincentian nationals who returned from British Virgin Islands. There were 3 recoveries.

17 September 2020, it was announced that there are no Active COVID-19 Cases in Saint Vincent and the Grenadines.

=== October to December 2020 ===
15 October 2020, it was announced that there is one Active COVID-19 case. An American national who arrived in Saint Vincent and the Grenadines on 14 October from Florida.

16 October 2020, it was announced that there are two more Active COVID-19 cases. Both cases arrived on a Caribbean Airlines flight from Barbados.

20 October 2020, it was announced that there is one additional COVID-19 case. The adult traveler arrived from the USA on Sunday, 18 October 2020.

23 October 2020, it was announced that there are five additional COVID-19 cases. 4 from the US and one from Canada, all arrived with negative PCR tests.

18 November 2020, it was announced that there are five additional COVID-19 cases.

=== January 2021 ===
On 15 January 2021, the country recorded its first death from COVID-19, a 49-year-old female with multiple pre-existing conditions.

=== April 2021 ===
In April, difficulties to contain the virus were compounded by the catastrophic eruption of La Soufrière. Evacuation efforts were subsequently complicated by the need to conduct testing and vaccination before entering neighboring islands.

=== December 2021 ===
On 29 December 2021, the country's National Emergency Management Organisation (NEMO) announced the first recorded case of the Omicron variant.

== See also ==
- Caribbean Public Health Agency
- COVID-19 pandemic in Grenada
- COVID-19 pandemic in North America
- COVID-19 pandemic by country and territory
