= Frederick Ballantyne =

Governor-General of Saint Vincent and the Grenadines from 2002 to 2019 (1936–2020)

Sir Frederick Ballantyne GCMG
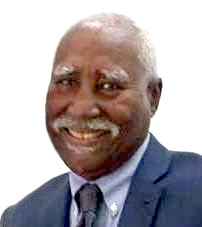
- Ballantyne in 2017

Governor-General of Saint Vincent and the Grenadines
- In office 22 June 2002 – 31 July 2019
- Monarch: Elizabeth II
- Prime Minister: Ralph Gonsalves
- Preceded by: Charles Antrobus; Monica Dacon (acting)
- Succeeded by: Susan Dougan

Personal details
- Born: Frederick Nathaniel Ballantyne; 5 July 1936 Layou, Saint Vincent, British Windward Islands
- Died: 23 January 2020 (aged 83) Villa, St. Vincent and the Grenadines
- Spouse: Sally-Ann Ballantyne
- Education: Howard University (BS); State University of New York Upstate Medical University (MD)

Sir Frederick Nathaniel Ballantyne GCMG (5 July 1936 – 23 January 2020) was a Vincentian cardiologist who served as Governor-General of Saint Vincent and the Grenadines from 2002 to 2019. A trained cardiologist and former chief medical officer of the country, he succeeded Dame Monica Dacon, who had been acting in the position after the death of Charles Antrobus.

== Early life and medical career ==
Ballantyne was born on 5 July 1936, an only child. His father owned a small hotel, and he described himself as "from a business family". Ballantyne was the first member of his family to attend high school. On the advice of an acquaintance who had studied medicine in the United States, he chose to attend university in that country (rather than in Britain or Canada, as was usual for Vincentians at the time). He completed an initial degree in chemistry at Howard University (in Washington, D.C.), and then went on to the SUNY Upstate Medical University (in Syracuse, New York) to study medicine. The "sole black individual" enrolled in the medical school, Ballantyne was elected to student government in every year of his degree, and in his final year was elected student body president. He interned in at the Montreal General Hospital after graduation, and then completed his residency in internal medicine in Rochester, New York, followed by a fellowship in cardiology.

Upon returning to Saint Vincent in 1971, Ballantyne was "the most highly trained physician on the island". He was consequently appointed chief of medicine at the newly constructed Kingstown General Hospital (now called the Milton Cato Memorial Hospital). Ballantyne oversaw upgrades in the facilities of both the hospital and regional health clinics, with one of his first priorities being to expand the hospital's immunisation program. He also instituted the hospital's Visiting Specialist Program, which recruited overseas medical specialists to volunteer in Saint Vincent's hospitals in exchange for free accommodation in the country's resorts. In 1985, Ballantyne was appointed Saint Vincent's chief medical officer, serving in the position until 1992. He remained involved in medicine after his official retirement from practising, in a consulting role.

Outside of his career in the medical field, Ballantyne had business interests in several other areas. Prior to being appointed governor-general, he served as president of the Millennium Bank, an offshore bank registered in Saint Vincent, and also as president of Dimethaid International Inc., a pharmaceutical company registered in Barbados. He was also the founder of International Business Services Limited (IBS), a financial services provider now run by his son, Marcus, and a co-owner of the Young Island Resort, a tourist resort on a small island off Saint Vincent's southern coast.

== Governor-General ==
Ballantyne was sworn in as Governor-General of Saint Vincent and the Grenadines on 22 June 2002, having been nominated to the position by the country's prime minister, Ralph Gonsalves. He replaced Dame Monica Dacon, who had been acting governor-general since the death of Sir Charles Antrobus on 3 June 2002. In connection with his new appointment, he was created a Knight Grand Cross of the Order of Saint Michael and Saint George by Queen Elizabeth II in December 2002. In June 2009, Ballantyne was also awarded a Doctor of Science (D.Sc.) degree by the University of the West Indies (UWI), as one of sixteen regional figures being recognised for their contributions with honorary degrees.

On 20 July 2019, Gonsalves announced that Ballantyne was to resign from the position of Governor-General due to ill health. He was succeeded by Dame Susan Dougan on 31 July 2019.

== Death ==
Ballantyne died at his home in Villa on 23 January 2020, at the age of 83.

Government offices
Preceded by Monica Dacon; Acting	Governor-General of Saint Vincent and the Grenadines; 2002–2019	Succeeded by Susan Dougan
