= Governor-General of Saint Vincent and the Grenadines =

Representative of the monarch

- Coat of arms of Saint Vincent and the Grenadines

- Flag of the governor-general

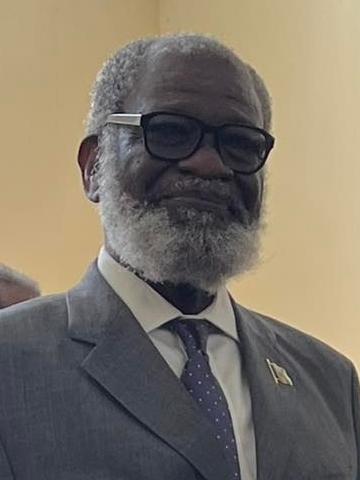
- Incumbent; Sir Stanley John since 6 January 2026
- Viceroy
- Style: His Excellency
- Residence: Government House, Saint Vincent and the Grenadines
- Appointer: Monarch of Saint Vincent and the Grenadines; on the advice of the prime minister
- Term length: At His Majesty's pleasure
- Formation: 27 October 1979
- First holder: Sir Sydney Gun-Munro
- Salary: EC$127,167 annually
- Website: www.gov.vc

The governor-general of Saint Vincent and the Grenadines is the viceregal representative of the Vincentian monarch, currently King Charles III.

The office of the governor-general was created in 1979 when the islands gained independence as a Commonwealth realm.

== List of governors-general ==
Following is a list of people who have served as governor-general of Saint Vincent and the Grenadines since independence in 1979.

Symbols

^† Died in office.

Denotes Acting Governors-General

No.	Portrait	Name (Birth–Death)	Term of office			Monarch (Reign)
No.	Portrait	Name (Birth–Death)	Took office	Left office	Time in office	Monarch (Reign)
1		Sir Sydney Gun-Munro (1916–2007)	27 October 1979	28 February 1985	5 years, 124 days	Elizabeth II (1979–2022)
2		Sir Joseph Lambert Eustace (1908–1996)	28 February 1985	29 February 1988	3 years, 1 day	Elizabeth II (1979–2022)
–		Henry Harvey Williams (1917–2004); Acting Governor-General	29 February 1988	20 September 1989	1 year, 204 days	Elizabeth II (1979–2022)
3		Sir David Emmanuel Jack (1918–1998)	20 September 1989	1 June 1996	6 years, 255 days	Elizabeth II (1979–2022)
4		Sir Charles Antrobus (1933–2002)	1 June 1996	3 June 2002^{[†]}	6 years, 2 days	Elizabeth II (1979–2022)
–		Dame Monica Dacon (b. 1934); Acting Governor-General	3 June 2002	22 June 2002	19 days	Elizabeth II (1979–2022)
5		Sir Frederick Ballantyne (1936–2020)	22 June 2002	1 August 2019	17 years, 40 days	Elizabeth II (1979–2022)
6		Dame Susan Dougan (b. 1955)	1 August 2019	5 January 2026	6 years, 157 days	
6		Dame Susan Dougan (b. 1955)	1 August 2019	5 January 2026	6 years, 157 days	Charles III (2022–present)
7		Sir Stanley John (b. 1951)	6 January 2026	Incumbent	276 days	Charles III (2022–present)

== See also ==
- List of prime ministers of Saint Vincent and the Grenadines
- List of colonial governors and administrators of Saint Vincent
